= List of Diptera of Ireland =

The number of species in the order Diptera (true flies) known to occur in Ireland is 3,304. There are 98 Dipteran families in Ireland. For genera and species within the various Families, see Fauna Europaea.

== Suborder Nematocera (thread-horns) ==
=== Superfamily Tipuloidea ===
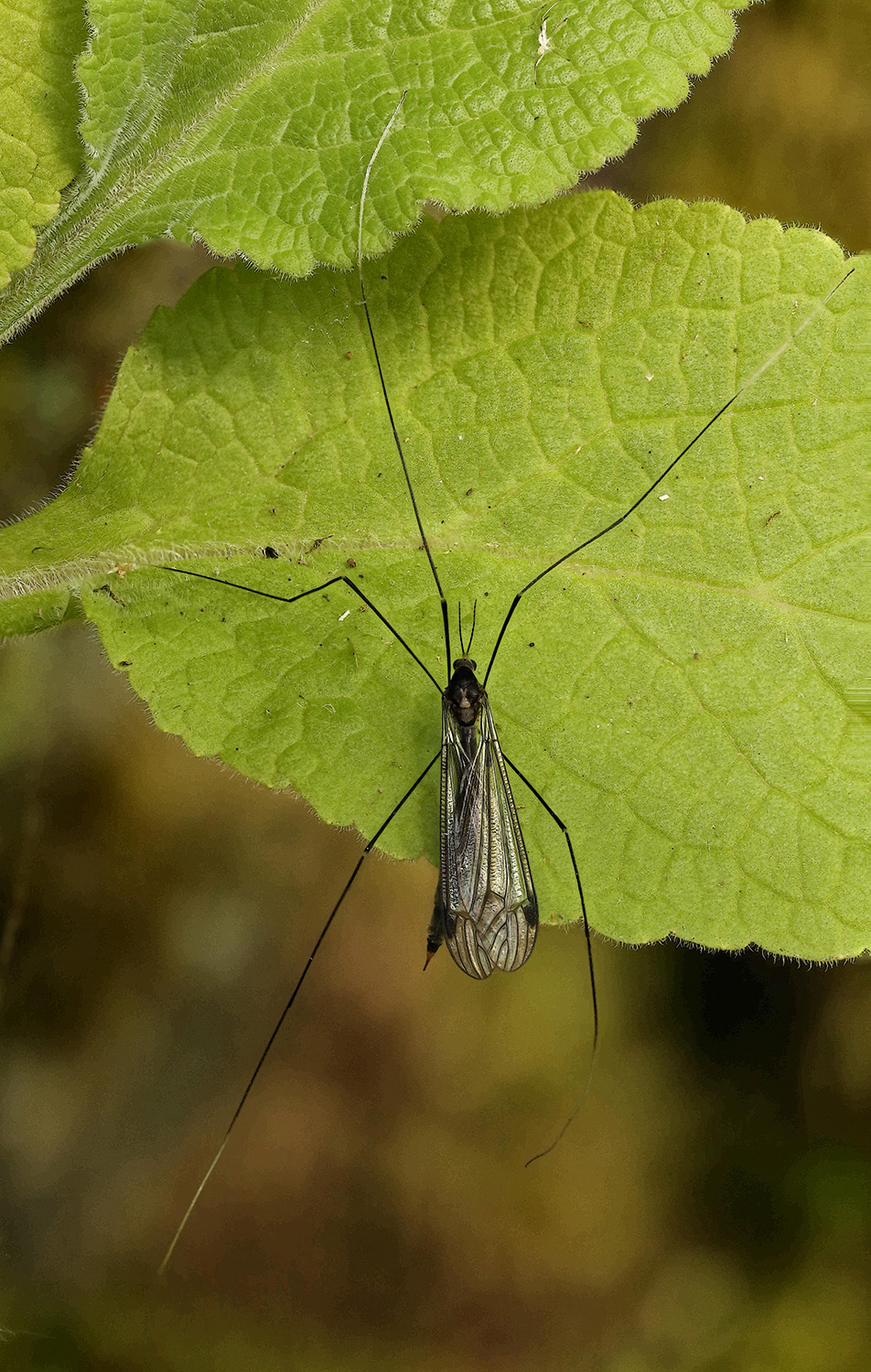
Dolichopeza albipes, a common crane fly

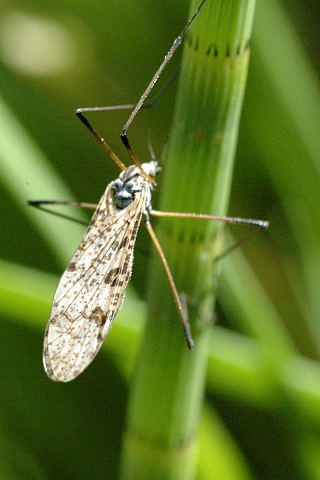
Eloeophila maculata

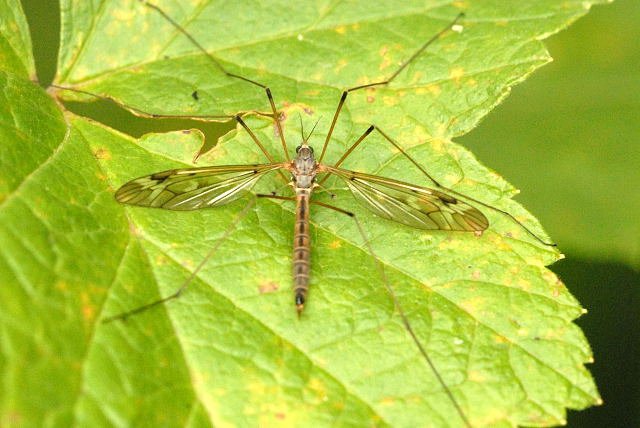
Tipula unca

- Tipulidae (crane flies) 57 species

including

  - Ctenophora (Ctenophora) pectinicornis (Linnaeus, 1758)
  - Dictenidia bimaculata (Linnaeus, 1761)
  - Dolichopeza albipes (Strom, 1768)
  - Tanyptera (Tanyptera) atrata (Linnaeus, 1758)
  - Nephrotoma appendiculata (Pierre, 1919)
  - Nephrotoma cornicina (Linnaeus, 1758)
  - Nephrotoma flavescens (Linnaeus, 1758)
  - Nephrotoma flavipalpis (Meigen, 1830)
  - Nephrotoma scurra (Meigen, 1818)
  - Prionocera turcica (Fabricius, 1787)
  - Tipula cava Riedel, 1913
  - Tipula confusa van der Wulp, 1883
  - Tipula fascipennis Meigen, 1818
  - Tipula hortorum Linnaeus, 1758
  - Tipula lateralis Meigen, 1804
  - Tipula lunata Linnaeus, 1758
  - Tipula luteipennis Meigen, 1830
  - Tipula oleracea Linnaeus, 1758
  - Tipula melanoceros Schummel, 1833
  - Tipula paludosa Meigen, 1830
  - Tipula pruinosa Wiedemann, 1817
  - Tipula scripta Meigen, 1830
  - Tipula staegeri Nielsen, 1922
  - Tipula submarmorata Schummel, 1833
  - Tipula unca Wiedemann, 1833
  - Tipula varipennis Meigen, 1818
  - Tipula vittata Meigen, 1804
- Cylindrotomidae (long-bodied craneflies) 3 species including
  - Cylindrotoma distinctissima (Meigen, 1818)
- Pediciidae (hairy-eyed craneflies) 15 species
  - Pedicia rivosa (Linnaeus, 1758)
  - Pedicia occulta (Meigen, 1830)
  - Tricyphona immaculata (Meigen, 1804)
- Limoniidae (several crane flies) 130 species including
  - Achyrolimonia decemmaculata Loew, 1873
  - Austrolimnophila ochracea (Meigen, 1804)
  - Cheilotrichia cinerascens (Meigen, 1804)
  - Dactylolabis sexmaculata (Macquart, 1826)
  - Dicranomyia chorea (Meigen, 1818)
  - Dicranomyia didyma (Meigen, 1804)
  - Dicranomyia fusca (Meigen, 1804)
  - Dicranomyia goritiensis (Mik, 1864)
  - Dicranomyia modesta (Meigen, 1818)
  - Dicranomyia sera (Walker, 1848)
  - Dicranophragma separatum (Walker, 1848)
  - Dicranota claripennis (Verrall, 1888)
  - Dicranota subtilis Loew, 1871
  - Diogma glabrata (Meigen, 1818)
  - Erioconopa trivialis (Meigen, 1818)
  - Erioptera fuscipennis (Meigen, 1818)
  - Erioptera lutea Meigen, 1804
  - Erioptera nielseni de Meijere, 1921
  - Erioconopa diuturna (Walker, 1848)
  - Erioconopa trivialis (Meigen, 1818)
  - Epiphragma ocellare (Linnaeus, 1758, 1760)
  - Euphylidorea aperta (Verrall, 1887)
  - Euphylidorea meigenii (Verrall, 1886)
  - Geranomyia unicolor (Haliday, 1833)
  - Helius flavus (Walker, 1856)
  - Limnophila schranki Oosterbroek, 1992
  - Limonia flavipes (Fabricius, 1787)
  - Limonia nubeculosa Meigen, 1804
  - Limonia phragmitidis (Schrank, 1781)
  - Molophilus appendiculatus (Staeger, 1840)
  - Molophilus ater Meigen, 1804
  - Molophilus flavus Goetghebuer, 1920
  - Molophilus griseus (Meigen, 1804)
  - Molophilus obscurus (Meigen, 1818)
  - Molophilus pleuralis de Meijere, 1920
  - Neolimonia dumetorum (Meigen, 1804)
  - Ormosia nodulosa (Macquart, 1826)
  - Paradelphomyia senilis (Haliday, 1833)
  - Phylidorea ferruginea (Meigen, 1818)
  - Pilaria discicollis (Meigen, 1818)
  - Rhipidia maculata Meigen, 1818
  - Rhypholophus varius (Meigen, 1818)
  - Symplecta hybrida (Meigen, 1804)
  - Symplecta pilipes (Fabricius, 1787)
  - Tasiocera murina (Meigen, 1818)

=== Superfamily Bibionoidea (march flies and lovebugs) ===
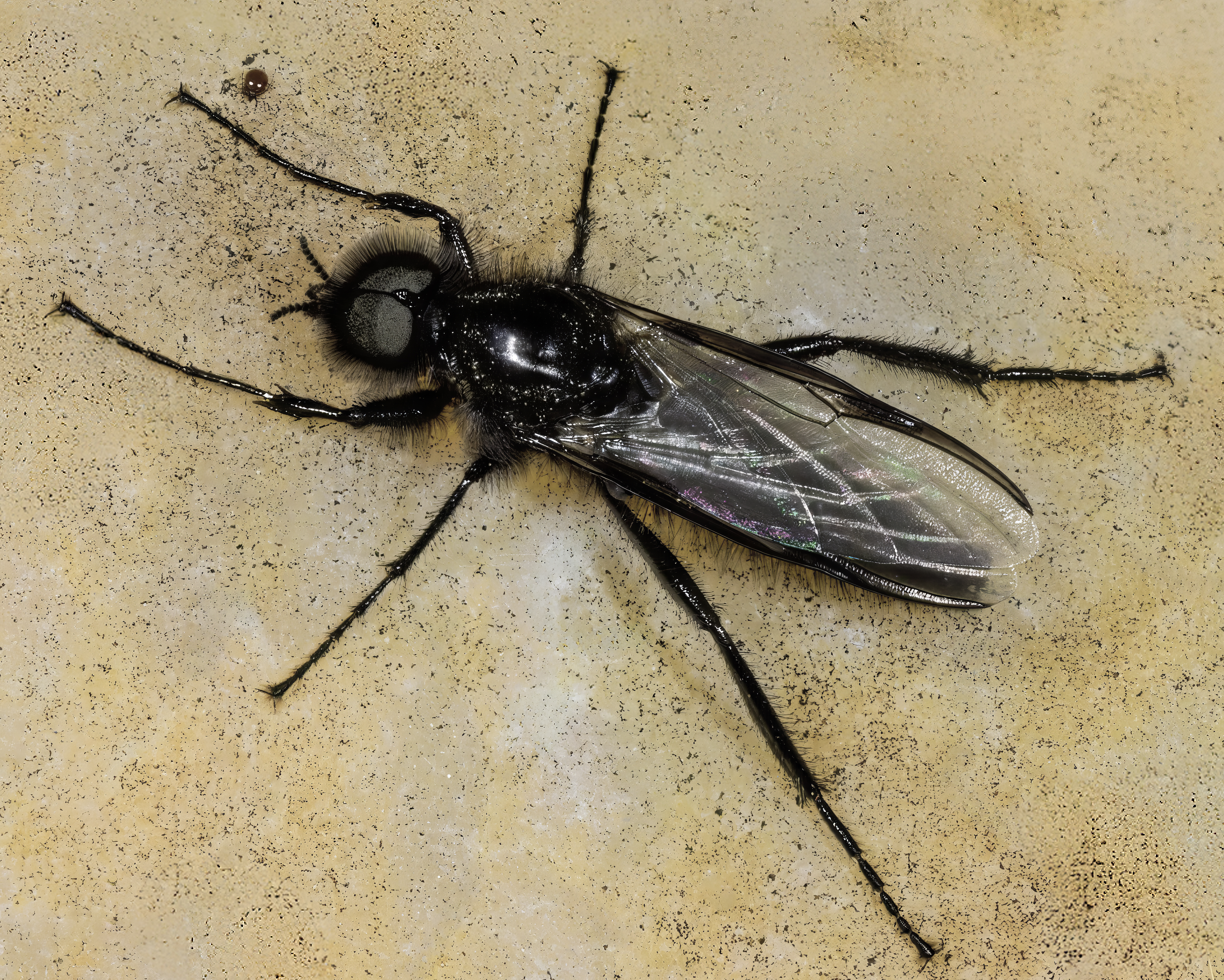
St. Mark's fly (Bibio marci)

- Bibionidae 12 species including
  - Bibio johannis (Linnaeus, 1767)
  - Bibio lanigerus Meigen, 1818
  - Bibio leucopterus (Meigen 1804)
  - Bibio longipes Loew, 1864
  - Bibio marci (Linnaeus, 1758)
  - Bibio nigriventris Haliday, 1833
  - Bibio pomonae (Fabricius, 1775)
  - Bibio varipes Meigen, 1830
  - Dilophus febrilis (Linnaeus, 1758)

=== Superfamily Sciaroidea ===
- Bolitophilidae 6 species including
  - Bolitophila cinerea Meigen, 1818
  - Bolitophila saundersii (Curtis, 1836)
- Diadocidiidae (some woodland flies) 2 species including
  - Diadocidia ferruginosa (Meigen, 1830)
- Ditomyiidae 1 species
  - Symmerus annulatus (Meigen, 1830)
- Keroplatidae (fungus gnats) 24 species including
  - Orfelia nemoralis (Meigen, 1818)
  - Isoneuromyia semirufa (Meigen, 1818)
  - Macrocera parva Lundstrom, 1914
- Mycetophilidae (fungus gnats) 242 species including
  - Acnemia nitidicollis (Meigen, 1818)
  - Boletina gripha Dziedzicki, 1885
  - Boletina griphoides Edwards, 1925
  - Boletina trispinosa Edwards, 1913
  - Boletina trivittata (Meigen, 1818)
  - Brachypeza bisignata Winnertz, 1863
  - Brevicornu foliatum (Edwards, 1925)
  - Coelosia tenella Zetterstedt, 1852
  - Cordyla flaviceps (Stæger, 1840)
  - Diadocidia ferruginosa (Meigen, 1830)
  - Exechia contaminata Winnertz, 1863
  - Exechia spinuligera Lundstrom, 1912
  - Mycetophila edwardsi Lundstrom, 1913
  - Mycetophila formosa Lundstrom, 1911
  - Mycetophila fungorum (De Geer, 1776)
  - Mycetophila luctuosa Meigen, 1830
  - Mycomya cinerascens (Macquart, 1826)
- Sciaridae (dark-winged fungus gnats) 104 species including
  - Bradysia ocellaris (Comstock, 1882)
  - Bradysia fungicola (Winnertz, 1867)
  - Bradysia praecox (Meigen, 1818)
  - Corynoptera forcipata (Winnertz, 1867)
  - Leptosciarella pilosa (Staeger 1840)
  - Leptosciarella subspinulosa Edwards 1925
  - Leptosciarella trochanterata (Zetterstedt 1851)
  - Leptosciarella yerburyi (Freeman 1983)
  - Sciara hemerobioides (Scopoli, 1763)
- Cecidomyiidae (gall midges / gall gnats) 100 species including
  - Sitodiplosis mosellana (Gehin, 1857)
  - Aphidoletes aphidimyza (Rondani, 1847)
  - Contarinia nasturtii (Kieffer, 1888)
  - Kiefferia pericarpiicola (Bremi, 1847)
  - Dasineura crataegi (Winnertz, 1853)
  - Dasineura ulmaria (Bremi, 1847)
  - Dasineura urticae (Perris, 1840)
  - Dasineura pteridis (Müller, 1871)
  - Rondaniola bursaria (Bremi, 1847)
  - Geocrypta galii Loew, 1850
  - Hartigiola annulipes (Hartig, 1839)

=== Superfamily Psychodoidea (moth fly) ===
- Psychodidae 67 species including
  - Boreoclytocerus ocellaris (Meigen 1818)
  - Ulomyia fuliginosa (Meigen, 1818)

=== Superfamily Trichoceroidea (winter crane flies) ===
- Trichoceridae 6 species including
  - Trichocera annulata Meigen, 1818

=== Superfamily Anisopodoidea (wood gnats, window gnats) ===
- Anisopodidae 4 species including
  - Sylvicola cinctus (Fabricius, 1787)
  - Sylvicola fenestralis (Scopoli, 1763)
  - Sylvicola punctatus (Fabricius, 1787)
- Mycetobiidae 2 species

=== Superfamily Scatopsoidea ===
- Scatopsidae (minute black scavenger flies) 23 species including
  - Scatopse notata (Linnaeus, 1758)
  - Apiloscatopse bifilata (Haliday in Walker, 1856)
  - Apiloscatopse scutellata (Loew, 1846)
  - Coboldia fuscipes (Meigen, 1830)

=== Superfamily Ptychopteroidea ===
- Ptychopteridae (phantom crane flies) 6 species including
  - Ptychoptera albimana (Fabricius, 1787)
  - Ptychoptera contaminata (Linnaeus, 1758)
  - Ptychoptera minuta Tonnoir, 1919

=== Superfamily Culicoidea ===
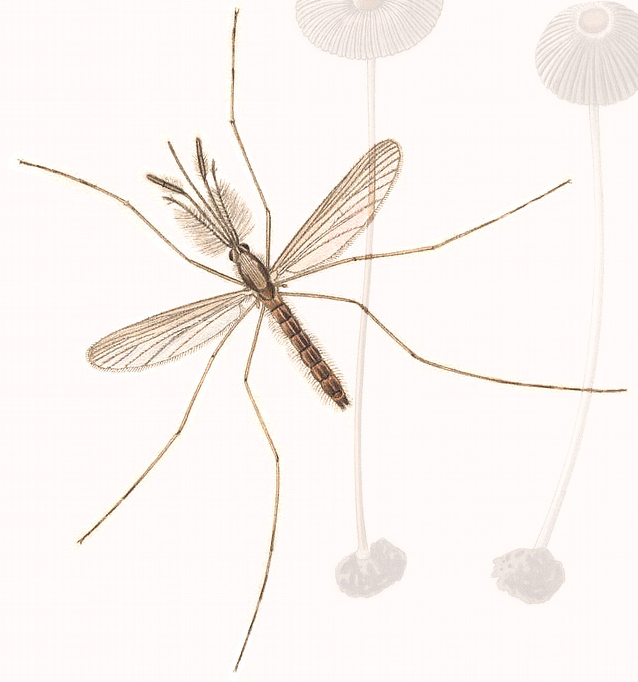
Anopheles claviger

- Dixidae (meniscus midges) 14 species including
  - Dixa nebulosa Meigen, 1830
  - Dixa dilatata Strobl, 1900
  - Dixa nubilipennis Curtis, 1832
  - Dixella martinii (Peus, 1934)
- Chaoboridae (phantom midges) 5 species including
  - Chaoborus flavicans (Meigen, 1830)
- Culicidae (mosquitoes) 17 species including
  - Aedes rusticus (Rossi, 1790)
  - Culex pipiens Linnaeus, 1758
  - Culiseta annulata (Schrank, 1776)

=== Superfamily Chironomoidea ===
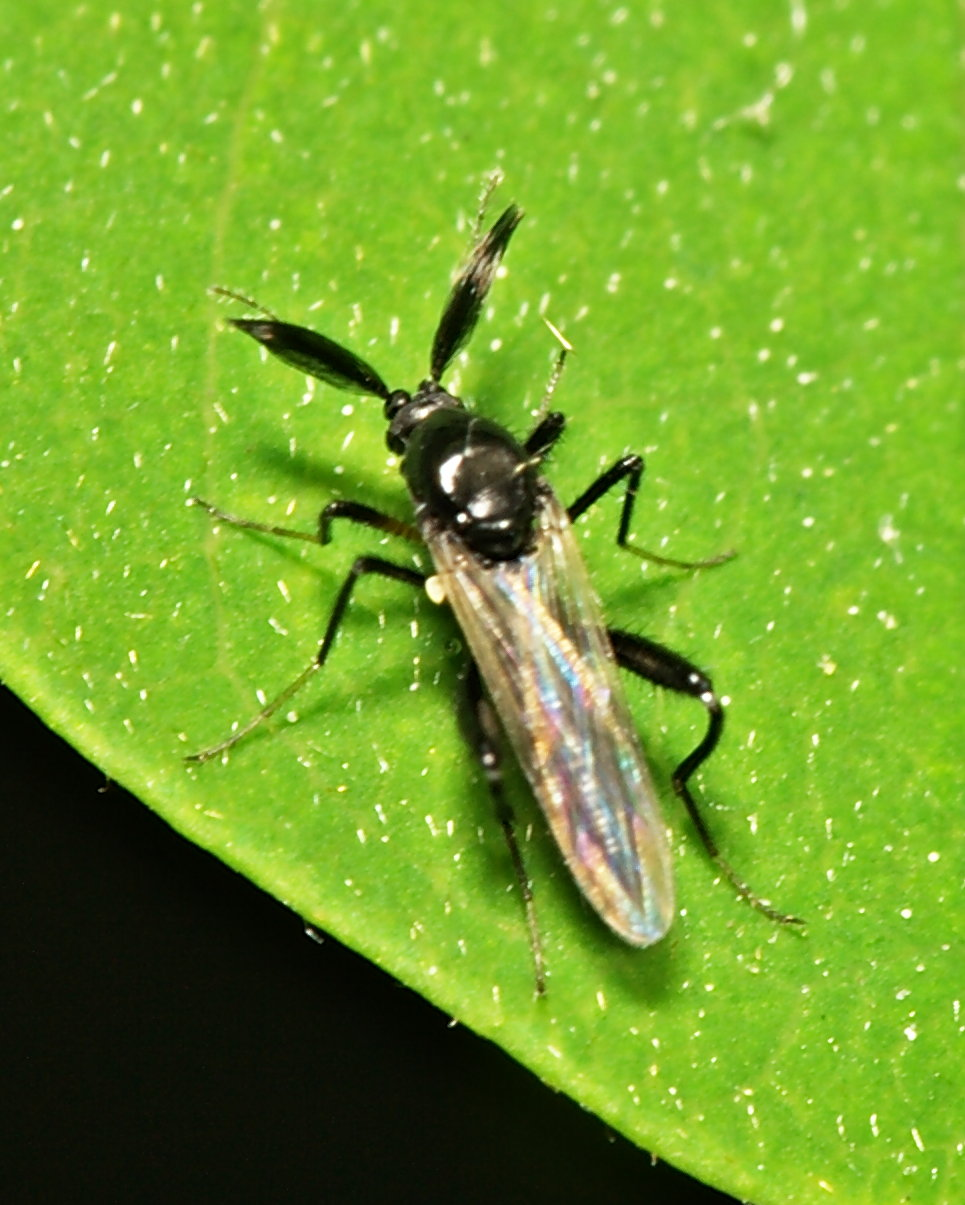
Male Ceratopogonidae (biting midge)

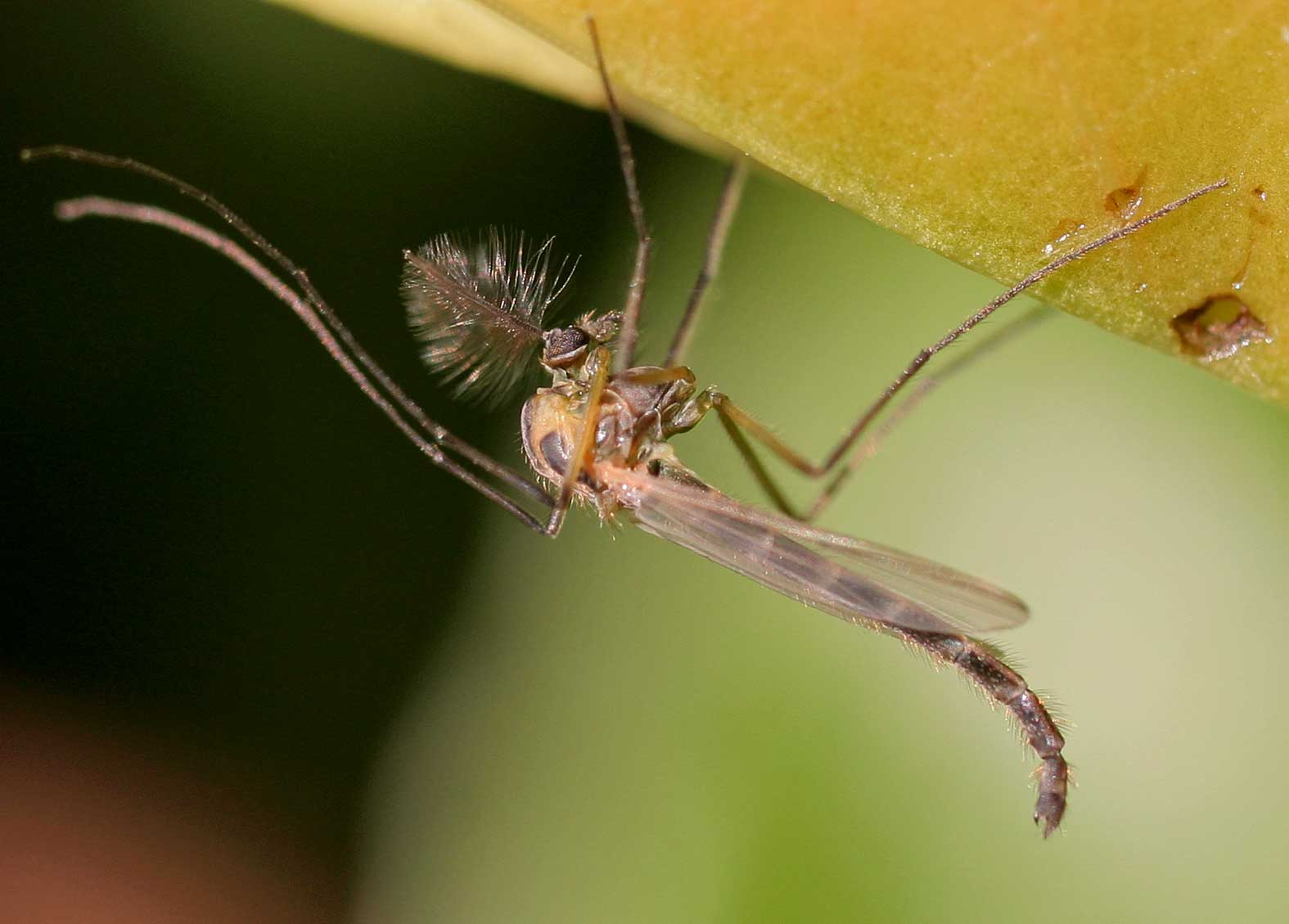
Male buzzer midge (Chironomus plumosus)

- Thaumaleidae (solitary/trickle midges) 2 species including
  - Thaumalea verralli Edwards, 1929
- Simuliidae (Black flies) 28 species including
  - Simulium latipes (Meigen, 1804)
  - Simulium variegatum Meigen, 1818
- Ceratopogonidae (biting midges) 64 species including
  - Culicoides impunctatus Goetghebuer, 1920
- Chironomidae (nonbiting midges) 475 species including
  - Ablabesmyia monilis (Linnaeus, 1758)
  - Chaetocladius suecicus (Kieffer, 1916)
  - Chironomus anthracinus Zetterstedt, 1860
  - Chironomus plumosus (Linnaeus, 1758)
  - Cricotopus bicinctus (Meigen, 1818)
  - Glyptotendipes pallens (Meigen, 1804)
  - Macropelopia nebulosa (Meigen, 1804)
  - Phaenopsectra flavipes (Meigen, 1818)
  - Prodiamesa olivacea (Meigen, 1818)

== Suborder Brachycera (flies with reduced antenna segmentation) ==
For Superfamilies Xylophagoidea, Tabanoidea, Stratiomyoidea, Nemestrinoidea, Asiloidea for which the listing given is complete see List of Diptera of Ireland Superfamilies Xylophagoidea, Tabanoidea, Stratiomyoidea, Nemestrinoidea, Asiloidea

=== Superfamily Empidoidea ===
- Atelestidae 1 species
- Hybotidae (dance flies) 77 species including
  - Bicellaria vana Collin, 1926
  - Bicellaria nigra (Meigen 1824)
  - Hybos culiciformis (Fabricius, 1775)
  - Hybos femoratus (Muller, 1776)
  - Leptopeza flavipes (Meigen, 1820)
  - Ocydromia glabricula (Fallen, 1816)
  - Platypalpus candicans (Fallén, 1815)
  - Platypalpus luteus (Meigen, 1804)
  - Platypalpus notatus (Meigen, 1822)
  - Tachydromia arrogans (Linnaeus, 1758, 1761)
  - Tachydromia umbrarum Haliday, 1833
- Empididae (dagger flies / balloon flies) 99 species including
  - Clinocera fontinalis (Haliday, 1833)
  - Dolichocephala irrorata (Fallén, 1816)
  - Dolichocephala guttata Haliday 1833
  - Empis albinervis Meigen, 1822
  - Empis borealis Linnaeus, 1758
  - Empis chioptera Meigen, 1804
  - Empis digramma Meigen in Gistl, 1835
  - Empis femorata Fabricius, 1798
  - Empis livida Linnaeus, 1758
  - Empis lucida Zetterstedt, 1838
  - Empis lutea Meigen, 1804
  - Empis nigripes Fabricius, 1794
  - Empis nuntia Meigen, 1838
  - Empis opaca Meigen, 1804
  - Empis pennipes Linnaeus, 1758
  - Empis planetica Collin, 1927
  - Empis stercorea Linnaeus, 1761
  - Empis tessellata Fabricius, 1794
  - Empis trigramma Wiedemann in Meigen, 1822
  - Empis verralli Collin, 1927
  - Heleodromia immaculata Haliday, 1833
  - Hilara brevistyla Collin, 1927
  - Hilara galactoptera Strobl, 1910
  - Hilara interstincta (Fallén, 1816
  - Hilara litorea (Fallén, 1816)
  - Hilara maura (Fabricius, 1776)
  - Hilara thoracica Macquart, 1827
  - Phyllodromia melanocephala (Fabricius 1794)
  - Rhamphomyia albohirta Collin, 1926
  - Rhamphomyia crassirostris (Fallén, 1816)
  - Rhamphomyia erythrophthalma Meigen, 1830
  - Rhamphomyia flava (Fallen, 1816)
  - Rhamphomyia hirsutipes Collin, 1926
  - Rhamphomyia lamellata Collin, 1926
  - Rhamphomyia nigripennis (Fabricius, 1794)
  - Rhamphomyia nitidula Zetterstedt, 1842
  - Rhamphomyia pilifer Meigen, 1838
  - Rhamphomyia simplex Zetterstedt, 1849
  - Rhamphomyia stigmosa Macquart, 1827
  - Rhamphomyia sulcata (Meigen, 1804)
  - Rhamphomyia umbripennis Meigen, 1838
  - Trichopeza longicornis (Meigen, 1822)
- Microphoridae 3 species
- Dolichopodidae (long-legged flies) 158 species including
  - Anepsiomyia flaviventris (Meigen, 1824)
  - Aphrosylus celtiber Haliday, 1855
  - Argyra argyria (Meigen, 1824)
  - Argyra diaphana (Fabricius, 1775)
  - Campsicnemus curvipes (Fallen, 1823)
  - Campsicnemus loripes (Haliday, 1832)
  - Campsicnemus scambus (Fallen, 1823)
  - Chrysotus neglectus (Wiedemann, 1817)
  - Diaphorus oculatus (Fallén, 1823)
  - Dolichopus atratus Meigen, 1824
  - Dolichopus clavipes Haliday, 1832
  - Dolichopus diadema Haliday, 1832
  - Dolichopus discifer Stannius, 1831
  - Dolichopus griseipennis Stannius, 1831
  - Dolichopus lepidus Staeger, 1842
  - Dolichopus longicornis Stannius, 1831
  - Dolichopus nubilus Meigen, 1824
  - Dolichopus pennatus Meigen, 1824
  - Dolichopus picipes Meigen, 1824
  - Dolichopus plumipes (Scopoli, 1763)
  - Dolichopus sabinus Haliday, 1838
  - Dolichopus simplex Meigen, 1824
  - Dolichopus ungulatus (Linnaeus, 1758)
  - Dolichopus urbanus Meigen, 1824
  - Dolichopus vitripennis Meigen, 1824
  - Gymnopternus aerosus (Fallen, 1823)
  - Gymnopternus celer (Meigen, 1824)
  - Gymnopternus cupreus (Fallen, 1823)
  - Hercostomus nigripennis (Fallén, 1823)
  - Hydrophorus nebulosus Fallén, 1823
  - Hydrophorus oceanus (Macquart, 1838)
  - Hydrophorus praecox (Lehmann, 1822)
  - Lianculus virens (Scopoli, 1763)
  - Medetera petrophiloides Parent, 1925
  - Medetera truncorum Meigen, 1824
  - Rhaphium appendiculatum Zetterstedt, 1849
  - Rhaphium consobrinum Zetterstedt, 1843
  - Rhaphium crassipes (Meigen 1824)
  - Scellus notatus (Fabricius, 1781)
  - Sciapus platypterus (Fabricius, 1805)
  - Sciapus wiedemanni (Fallen, 1823)
  - Sybistroma obscurellum (Fallén, 1823)
  - Sympycnus desoutteri Parent, 1925
  - Syntormon pallipes (Fabricius, 1794)
  - Tachytrechus notatus (Stannius, 1831)
  - Thinophilus ruficornis (Haliday, 1838 in Curtis)

=== Superfamily Platypezoidea ===
- Opetiidae (flat-footed flies) 1 species
  - Opetia nigra Meigen, 1830
- Platypezidae (flat-footed flies) 16 species including
  - Callomyia elegans Meigen, 1804
- Phoridae (scuttle flies / coffin flies) 151 species including
  - Megaselia scalaris Loew, 1866
  - Borophaga incrassata Meigen, 1830

=== Superfamily Lonchopteroidea (spear-winged flies or pointed-wing flies) ===
- Lonchopteridae 3 species including
- Lonchoptera lutea Panzer, 1809

=== Superfamily Syrphoidea ===
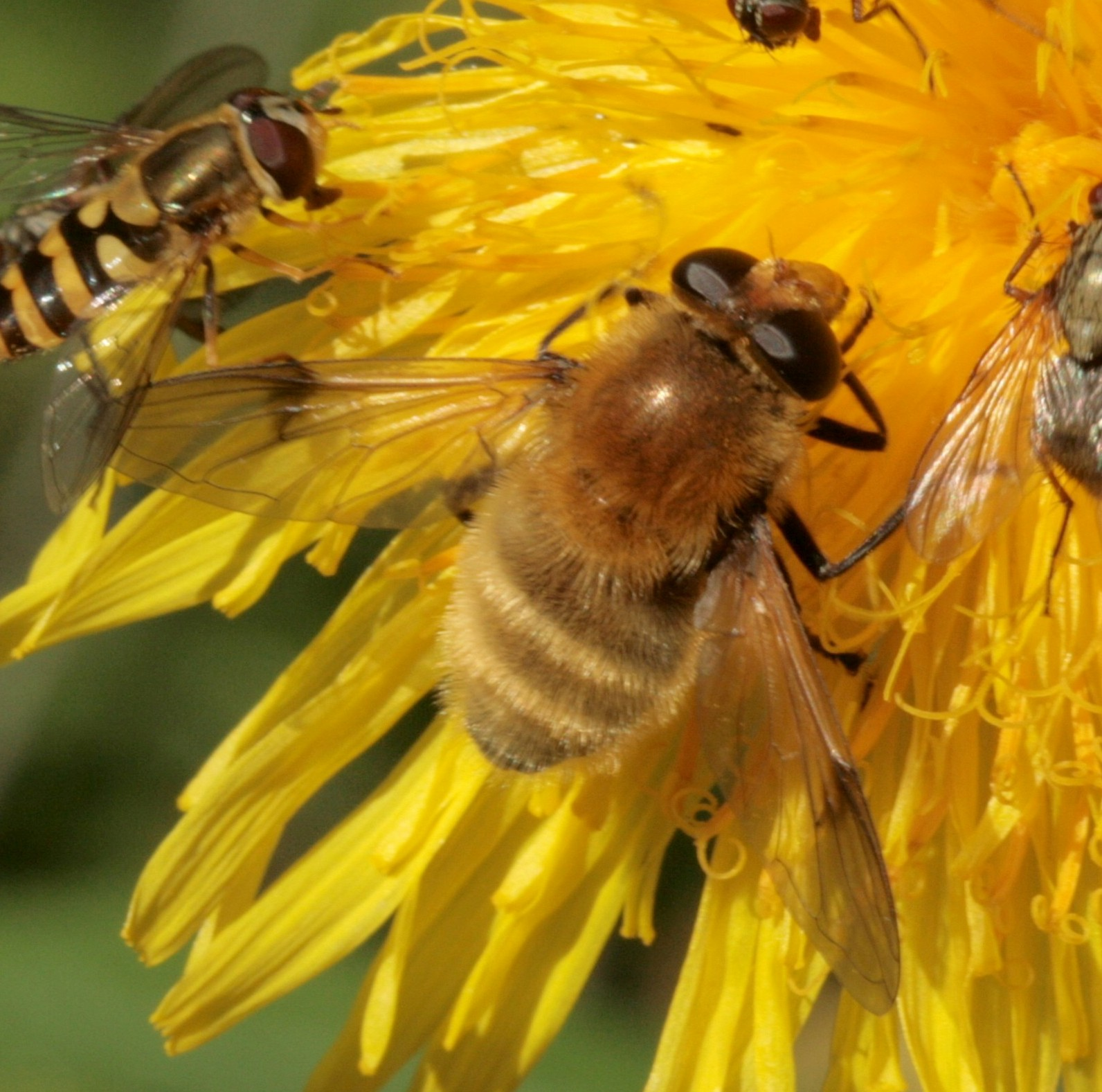
Female Arctophila superbiens, a common hoverfly.

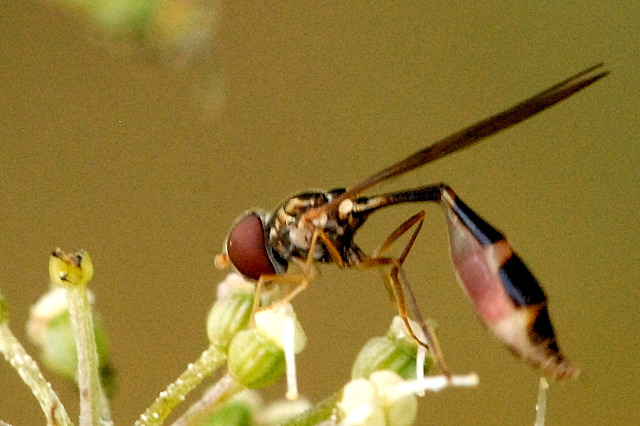
Female Baccha elongata

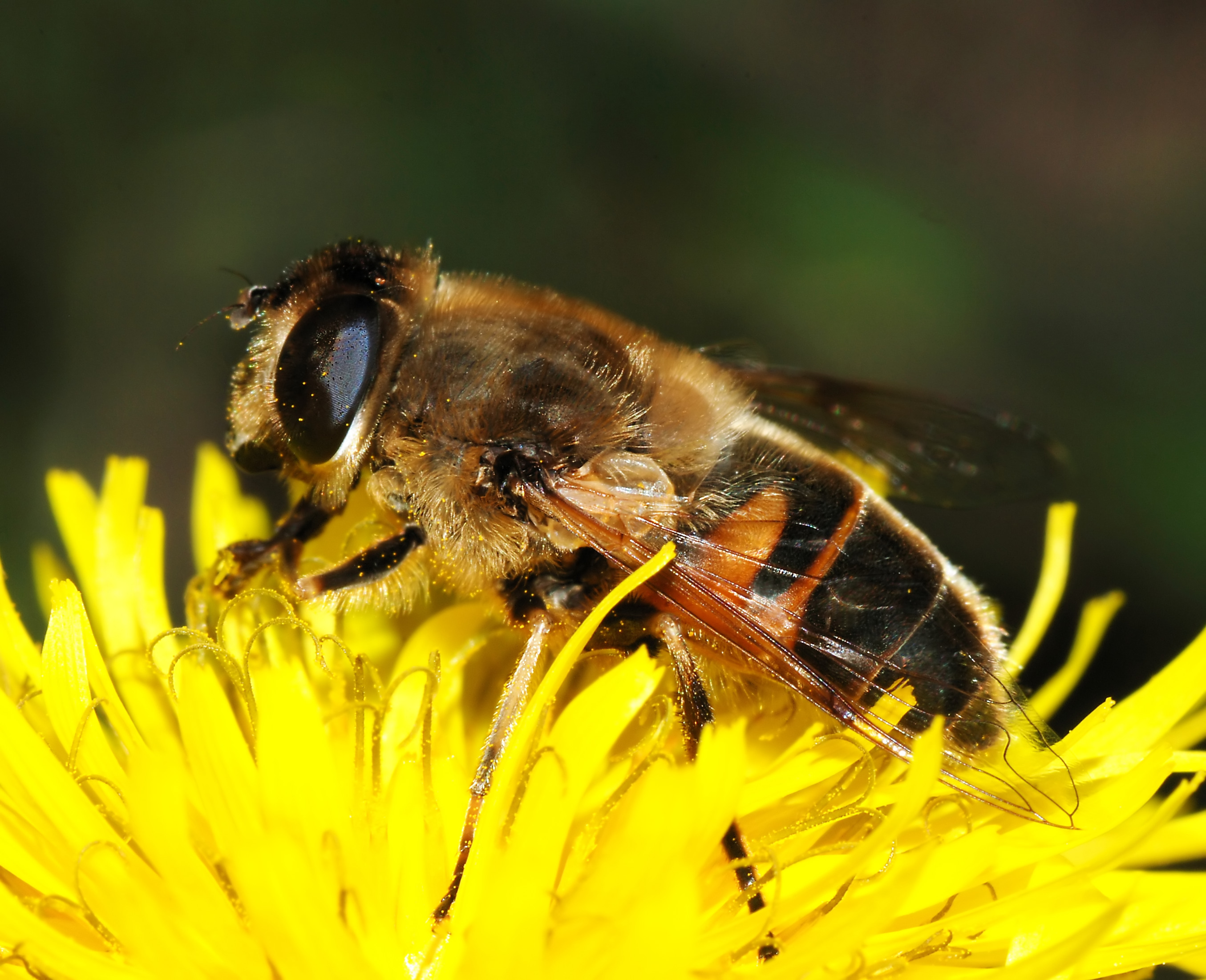
Female Eristalis tenax

- Syrphidae (hoverflies, flower flies) 183 species

see List of the Syrphidae of Ireland

- Pipunculidae (big-headed flies) 31 species including
  - Cephalops aeneus Fallen 1810
  - Cephalops obtusinervis (Zetterstedt 1844)
  - Chalarus spurius (Fallen 1816)
  - Dorylomorpha xanthopus (Thomson 1870)
  - Pipunculus thomsoni Becker 1897
  - Tomosvaryella littoralis (Becker 1897)
  - Verrallia aucta (Fallen 1817)

=== Superfamily Nerioidea ===
- Micropezidae (stilt-legged flies) 3 species including
  - Calobata petronella (Linnaeus, 1761)

=== Superfamily Diopsoidea ===
- Psilidae (rust flies) 19 species including
  - Chamaepsila (Chamaepsila) rosae (Fabricius, 1794)
  - Chyliza leptogaster Panzer, 1798
  - Loxocera albiseta (Schrank, 1803)
  - Loxocera aristata (Panzer, 1801)
  - Psila fimetaria (Linnaeus, 1761)

=== Superfamily Conopoidea (thick-headed flies) ===
- Conopidae (thick-headed flies) 11 species including
  - Conops quadrifasciatus De Geer, 1776
  - Sicus ferrugineus (Linnaeus, 1761)
  - Myopa buccata (Linnaeus, 1758)

=== Superfamily Tephritoidea ===
- Lonchaeidae (lance flies) 14 species including
  - Lonchaea chorea (Fabricius, 1781)
  - Setisquamalonchaea fumosa (Egger, 1862)
- Pallopteridae (flutter-wing / trembling-wing / waving-wing flies) 10 species including
  - Palloptera muliebris (Harris, [1780])
  - Palloptera ustulata Fallen, 1820
- Piophilidae (cheese flies) 7 species including
  - Piophila casei (Linnaeus, 1758)
- Ulidiidae (picture-winged flies) 6 species including
  - Ceroxys urticae (Linnaeus 1758)
  - Herina frondescentiae (Linnaeus, 1758)
  - Herina lugubris (Meigen 1826)
  - Seioptera vibrans (Linnaeus, 1758)
  - Tetanops myopina Fallen, 1820
- Platystomatidae (signal flies) 2 species including
  - Platystoma seminationis (Fabricius, 1775)
- Tephritidae (fruit flies, peacock flies) 27 species including
  - Acidia cognata (Wiedemann, 1817)
  - Anomoia purmunda (Harris 1780)
  - Campiglossa absinthii (Fabricius, 1805)
  - Campiglossa loewiana (Hendel, 1927)
  - Ensina sonchi (Linnaeus, 1767)
  - Euleia heraclei (Linnaeus, 1758)
  - Philophylla caesio (Harris 1780)
  - Sphenella marginata (Fallén, 1814)
  - Tephritis bardanae (Shrank, 1803)
  - Tephritis conura (Loew, 1844)
  - Tephritis formosa (Loew, 1844)
  - Tephritis hyoscyami (Linnaeus, 1758)
  - Tephritis leontodontis (De Geer, 1776)
  - Tephritis neesii (Meigen, 1830)
  - Tephritis vespertina (Loew, 1844)
  - Terellia ruficauda (Fabricius, 1794)
  - Terellia serratulae (Linnaeus, 1758)
  - Trupanea stellata (Fuesslin 1775)
  - Trypeta zoe Meigen, 1826
  - Urophora jaceana (Hering 1935)
  - Urophora stylata (Fabricius, 1775)
  - Xyphosia miliaria Schrank, 1781

=== Superfamily Lauxanioidea ===
- Lauxaniidae 35 species including
  - Calliopum aeneum (Fallen, 1820)
  - Lauxania cylindricornis (Fabricius, 1794)
  - Meiosimyza rorida (Fallén, 1820)
  - Minettia inusta (Meigen, 1826)
  - Minettia longipennis (Fabricius, 1794)
  - Peplomyza litura (Meigen, 1826)
  - Sapromyza quadricincta Becker, 1895
  - Sapromyza quadripunctata (Linnaeus, 1767)
  - Tricholauxania praeusta Fallén, 1820
- Chamaemyiidae 8 species including
  - Chamaemyia flavipalpis (Haliday, 1838)

=== Superfamily Sciomyzidea ===
- Coelopidae (kelp flies) 3 species including
  - Coelopa frigida (Fabricius, 1805)
- Dryomyzidae 3 species including
  - Dryomyza anilis Fallén, 1820
- Helcomyzidae 1 species
  - Helcomyza ustulata Curtis, 1825
- Heterocheilidae (half-bridge flies) 1 species
  - Heterocheila buccata (Fallen, 1820)
- Sciomyzidae (marsh flies, snail-killing flies) 55 species including
  - Anticheta analis (Meigen, 1830)
  - Anticheta brevipennis (Zetterstedt, 1846)
  - Colobaea punctata (Lundbeck, 1923)
  - Coremacera marginata (Fabricius, 1775)
  - Dictya umbrarum (Linnaeus, 1758)
  - Ditaeniella grisescens (Meigen, 1830)
  - Elgiva cucularia (Linnaeus, 1767)
  - Elgiva solicita (Harris, 1780)
  - Hydromya dorsalis (Fabricius, 1775)
  - Ilione albiseta (Scopoli, 1763)
  - Ilione lineata (Fallen, 1820)
  - Limnia unguicornis (Scopoli, 1763)
  - Pherbellia argyra Verbeke, 1967
  - Pherbellia cinerella (Fallen, 1820)
  - Pherbellia nana (Fallen, 1820)
  - Pherbellia schoenherri (Fallén, 1826)
  - Pherbellia ventralis (Fallén, 1820)
  - Pherbina coryleti (Scopoli, 1763)
  - Pteromicra angustipennis (Staeger, 1845)
  - Renocera pallida (Fallén, 1820)
  - Renocera strobili Hendel, 1900
  - Sepedon sphegea (Fabricius, 1775)
  - Sepedon spinipes (Scopoli, 1763)
  - Tetanocera arrogans Meigen, 1830
  - Tetanocera elata (Fabricius, 1781)
  - Tetanocera ferruginea Fallén, 1820
  - Tetanocera robusta Loew, 1847
  - Trypetoptera punctulata (Scopoli, 1763)
- Sepsidae (black scavenger flies, ensign flies) 19 species including
  - Nemopoda nitidula (Fallen, 1820)
  - Saltella sphondylii (Schrank, 1803)
  - Sepsis fulgens Meigen, 1826
  - Sepsis punctum (Fabricius, 1794)
  - Sepsis violacea Meigen, 1826
  - Themira annulipes (Meigen, 1826)
  - Themira putris (Linnaeus, 1758)

=== Superfamily Opomyzoidea ===
- Clusiidae (druid flies) 5 species including
  - Paraclusia tigrina (Fallen, 1820)
- Odiniidae 2 species including
  - Odinia boletina (Zetterstedt 1848)
- Agromyzidae (leaf-miner flies) 114 species including
  - Agromyza albipennis Meigen 1830
  - Agromyza nana Meigen 1830
  - Agromyza nigripes Meigen, 1830
  - Nemorimyza posticata (Meigen, 1830)
  - Phytoliriomyza melampyga (Loew, 1869)
  - Phytomyza affinis Fallen, 1823
  - Phytomyza ranunculi (Schrank, 1803)
- Opomyzidae 8 species including
  - Geomyza tripunctata Fallén, 1823
  - Opomyza florum (Fabricius, 1794)
  - Opomyza petrei Mesnil, 1934
- Anthomyzidae 6 species including
  - Stiphrosoma sabulosum (Haliday, 1837)
  - Anthomyza gracilis Fallen, 1823
- Aulacigastridae (sap flies) 1 species
- Stenomicridae 1 species
- Asteiidae 3 species including
  - Asteia amoena Meigen, 1830
  - Leiomyza scatophagina (Fallen, 1823)
  - Leiomyza laevigata (Meigen, 1830)

=== Superfamily Carnoidea ===
- Milichiidae (freeloader flies, filth flies, jackal flies) 2 species
- Carnidae (bird flies / filth flies) 2 species
- Braulidae (bee lice) 1 species
  - Braula coeca Nitzsch, 1818
- Canacidae (beach flies, surf flies, surge flies) 6 species including
  - Canace nasica (Haliday, 1839)
- Chloropidae (frit flies, eye gnats, eye flies, grass flies) 70 species including
  - Cetema elongatum (Meigen, 1830)
  - Chlorops planifrons (Loew, 1866)
  - Chlorops pumilionis (Bjerkander, 1778)
  - Dicraeus vagans Meigen, 1838
  - Diplotoxa messoria Fallen, 1820
  - Elachiptera cornuta Fallen, 1820
  - Melanum laterale Haliday, 1833
  - Meromyza femorata Macquart, 1835
  - Meromyza pratorum Meigen, 1830
  - Meromyza triangulina Fedoseeva, 1960

=== Superfamily Sphaeroceroidea ===
- Heleomyzidae 33 species including
  - Heleomyza serrata (Linnaeus 1758)
  - Heteromyza rotundicornis (Zetterstedt, 1846)
  - Scoliocentra villosa (Meigen, 1830)
  - Suillia affinis (Meigen, 1830)
  - Suillia bicolor (Zetterstedt, 1838)
  - Suillia humilis (Meigen, 1830)
  - Suillia imberbis Czerny, 1924
  - Suillia variegata (Loew, 1862)
  - Morpholeria ruficornis (Meigen, 1830)
  - Tephrochlamys rufiventris (Meigen, 1830)
- Trichoscelididae 2 species
- Chyromyidae 3 species including
  - Gymnochiromyia flavella (Zetterstedt, 1848)
- Sphaeroceridae (small dung flies, lesser dung flies, lesser corpse flies) 72 species including
  - Copromyza nigrina (Gimmerthal 1847)
  - Copromyza stercoraria (Meigen, 1830)
  - Copromyza equina Fallén 1820
  - Crumomyia roserii Rondani, 1880
  - Crumomyia fimetaria Meigen, 1830
  - Crumomyia nitida (Meigen, 1830)
  - Leptocera fontinalis (Fallen, 1826)
  - Limosina silvatica Meigen, 1830
  - Lotophila atra (Meigen, 1830
  - Spelobia clunipes (Meigen, 1830)
  - Spelobia talparum (Richards, 1927)
  - Thoracochaeta brachystoma Stenhammar, 1854
  - Thoracochaeta zosterae (Haliday, 1833)

=== Superfamily Ephydroidea ===
- Drosophilidae 30 species including
  - Chymomyza fuscimana (Zetterstedt, 1938)
  - Drosophila melanogaster Meigen 1830
  - Drosophila subobscura Collin 1936
  - Drosophila tristis Fallen, 1823
  - Lordiphosa andalusiaca (Strobl, 1906)
  - Scaptomyza flava (Fallen, 1823)
  - Stegana coleoptrata (Scopoli 1763)
- Campichoetidae 2 species including
  - Campichoeta obscuripennis (Meigen, 1830)
- Diastatidae 4 species including
  - Diastata adusta Meigen, 1830
  - Diastata costata Meigen, 1830
  - Diastata fuscula (Fallen, 1823)
  - Diastata nebulosa (Fallen, 1823)
- Camillidae 1 species
  - Camilla flavicauda Duda, 1922
- Ephydridae (shore flies, brine flies) 68 species including
  - Dichaeta caudata (Fallen, 1813)
  - Discomyza incurva (Fallen, 1823)
  - Ilythea spilota Curtis, 1832
  - Limnellia quadrata (Fallen, 1813)
  - Notiphila aenea Waltl, 1837
  - Notiphila riparia Meigen, 1830
  - Ochthera mantis De Geer, 1776
  - Paracoenia fumosa (Stenhammar, 1844)
  - Parydra aquila (Fallen, 1813)
  - Parydra fossarum (Haliday, 1833)

=== Superfamily Hippoboscoidea ===
- Hippoboscidae (louse flies, keds) 8 species including
  - Hippobosca equina Linnaeus 1758
  - Crataerina pallida (Olivier in Latreille, 1812)
  - Lipoptena cervi (Linnaeus, 1758)
  - Melophagus ovinus (Linnaeus, 1758)
  - Ornithomya avicularia (Linnaeus 1758)
  - Ornithomya fringillina Curtis, 1836
  - Stenepteryx hirundinis (Linnaeus 1758)
- Nycteribiidae (bat flies) 2 species including
  - Nycteribia kolenatii Theodor & Moscona, 1954

=== Superfamily Muscoidea ===
- Scathophagidae (dung flies) 33 species including
  - Chaetosa punctipes Meigen, 1826
  - Cleigastra apicalis (Meigen, 1826)
  - Cordilura albipes Fallen, 1819
  - Cordilura pudica Meigen, 1826
  - Nanna inermis (Becker 1894)
  - Norellia spinipes (Meigen, 1826)
  - Norellisoma spinimanum (Fallen 1819)
  - Scathophaga furcata (Say, 1823)
  - Scathophaga inquinata (Meigen, 1826)
  - Scathophaga litorea (Fallén, 1819)
  - Scathophaga stercoraria (Linnaeus 1758)
  - Scathophaga suilla (Fabricius, 1794)
  - Spaziphora hydromyzina (Fallen, 1819)
  - Trichopalpus fraternus (Meigen, 1826)
- Anthomyiidae 93 species including
  - Alliopsis billbergi (Zetterstedt, 1838)
  - Anthomyia confusanea Michelsen in Michelsen & Baez, 1985
  - Anthomyia bazini Seguy, 1929
  - Botanophila discreta (Meigen, 1826)
  - Botanophila fugax (Meigen, 1826)
  - Chirosia betuleti (Ringdahl, 1935)
  - Delia albula (Fallén, 1825)
  - Delia antiqua (Meigen, 1826)
  - Delia radicum (Linnaeus, 1758)
  - Delia floralis (Fallén, 1824)
  - Fucellia fucorum (Fallen, 1819)
  - Hylemya nigrimana (Meigen, 1826)
  - Hylemya urbica Wulp, 1896
  - Hylemya vagans (Panzer, 1798)
  - Hylemya variata (Fallen, 1823)
  - Hydrophoria lancifer (Harris, [1780])
  - Hydrophoria ruralis (Meigen, 1826)
  - Lasiomma seminitidum (Zetterstedt, 1845)
  - Mycophaga testacea (Gimmerthal, 1834)
  - Myopina myopina (Fallen, 1824)
  - Paradelia intersecta (Meigen, 1826)
  - Pegomya betae (Curtis, 1847)
  - Pegomya bicolor (Wiedemann, 1817)
  - Pegomya rubivora (Coquillett, 1897)
  - Pegomya solennis (Meigen, 1826)
  - Pegoplata aestiva (Meigen, 1826)
  - Pegoplata infirma (Meigen, 1826)
- Fanniidae 27 species including
  - Fannia armata (Meigen, 1826)
  - Fannia canicularis (Linnaeus, 1761)
  - Fannia lepida (Wiedemann, 1817)
  - Fannia lustrator (Harris, 1780)
  - Fannia mollissima (Haliday, 1840)
  - Fannia pusio (Wiedemann, 1830)
  - Fannia rondanii (Strobl, 1893)
  - Fannia scalaris (Fabricius, 1794)
  - Fannia serena (Fallén, 1825)
  - Fannia sociella (Zetterstedt, 1845)
- Muscidae (house flies, stable flies) 163 species including
  - Achanthiptera rohrelliformis (Robineau-Desvoidy, 1830)
  - Azelia cilipes (Haliday, 1838)
  - Azelia nebulosa Robineau-Desvoidy, 1830
  - Coenosia albicornis Meigen, 1826
  - Coenosia agromyzina (Fallen, 1825)
  - Coenosia antennata (Zetterstedt, 1849)
  - Coenosia mollicula (Fallen, 1825)
  - Coenosia testacea (Robineau-Desvoidy, 1830)
  - Coenosia tigrina (Fabricius, 1775)
  - Coenosia verralli Collin, 1953
  - Graphomya maculata (Scopoli, 1763)
  - Haematobia irritans (Linnaeus, 1758)
  - Haematobosca stimulans (Meigen, 1824)
  - Hebecnema umbratica (Meigen, 1826)
  - Hebecnema nigra (Robineau-Desvoidy, 1830)
  - Hebecnema nigricolor (Fallen, 1825)
  - Hebecnema vespertina (Fallén, 1823)
  - Helina allotalla (Meigen, 1830)
  - Helina confinis (Fallén, 1825)
  - Helina depuncta (Fallén, 1825)
  - Helina evecta (Harris, 1780)
  - Helina impuncta (Fallén, 1825)
  - Helina maculipennis (Zetterstedt, 1845)
  - Helina protuberans (Zetterstedt, 1845)
  - Helina reversio (Harris, 1780)
  - Helina setiventris Ringdahl, 1924
  - Hydrotaea albipuncta (Zetterstedt, 1845)
  - Hydrotaea cyrtoneurina (Zetterstedt, 1845)
  - Hydrotaea dentipes (Fabricius, 1805)
  - Limnophora tigrina Am Stein, 1860
  - Limnophora triangula (Fallén, 1825)
  - Lispe pygmaea Fallen, 1825
  - Lispe tentaculata (De Geer, 1776)
  - Lispocephala alma (Meigen, 1826)
  - Lispocephala erythrocera (Robineau-Desvoidy, 1830)
  - Lophosceles cinereiventris (Zetterstedt, 1845)
  - Mesembrina meridiana (Linnaeus, 1758)
  - Morellia aenescens Robineau-Desvoidy, 1830
  - Morellia simplex (Loew, 1857)
  - Musca autumnalis De Geer, 1776
  - Musca domestica Linnaeus, 1758
  - Muscina levida (Harris, 1780)
  - Mydaea corni (Scopoli, 1763)
  - Mydaea setifemur Ringdahl, 1924
  - Mydaea urbana (Meigen, 1826)
  - Myospila meditabunda (Fabricius, 1781)
  - Phaonia angelicae (Scopoli, 1763)
  - Phaonia cincta (Zetterstedt, 1846)
  - Phaonia errans (Meigen, 1826)
  - Phaonia fuscata (Fallén, 1825)
  - Phaonia halterata (Stein, 1893)
  - Phaonia incana (Wiedemann, 1817)
  - Phaonia pallida (Fabricius, 1787)
  - Phaonia palpata (Stein, 1897)
  - Phaonia perdita (Meigen, 1830)
  - Phaonia rufiventris (Scopoli, 1763)
  - Phaonia subventa (Harris, 1780)
  - Phaonia tuguriorum (Scopoli, 1763)
  - Phaonia valida (Harris, 1780)
  - Schoenomyza litorella (Fallen, 1823)
  - Spilogona aerea (Fallén, 1825)
  - Spilogona denigrata (Meigen, 1826)
  - Thricops diaphanus (Wiedemann, 1817)
  - Thricops rostratus (Meade, 1882)
  - Thricops semicinereus (Wiedemann, 1817)
  - Villeneuvia aestuum (Villeneuve, 1902)

=== Superfamily Oestroidea ===
- Calliphoridae (blow-flies, carrion flies, bluebottles, greenbottles, cluster flies) 20 species including
  - Calliphora vicina Robineau-Desvoidy 1830
  - Calliphora vomitoria (Linnaeus 1758)
  - Lucilia caesar (Linnaeus 1758)
  - Lucilia illustris (Meigen 1826)
  - Lucilia sericata (Meigen 1826)
  - Lucilia silvarum (Meigen 1826)
  - Melinda viridicyanea (Robineau-Desvoidy 1830)
  - Phormia regina (Meigen 1826)
  - Pollenia rudis (Fabricius 1794)
  - Protophormia terraenovae (Robineau-Desvoidy 1830)
- Rhinophoridae 4 species including
  - Melanophora roralis (Linnaeus 1758)
  - Paykullia maculata (Fallen, 1815)
  - Rhinophora lepida (Meigen 1824)
- Sarcophagidae (flesh flies) 24 species including
  - Miltogramma punctata Meigen, 1824
  - Sarcophaga africa (Wiedemann 1824)
  - Sarcophaga aratrix Pandelle, 1896
  - Sarcophaga carnaria (Linnaeus 1758)
  - Sarcophaga incisilobata Pandellé, 1896
  - Sarcophaga sinuata Meigen, 1826
  - Sarcophaga subvicina Baranov, 1937
  - Sarcophaga teretirostris Pandelle, 1896
  - Sarcophaga vagans Meigen, 1826
- Tachinidae 65 species including
  - Gymnosoma rotundatum (Linnaeus, 1758)
  - Actia pilipennis (Fallén, 1810)
  - Aplomya confinis (Fallen 1820)
  - Blondelia nigripes (Fallén, 1810)
  - Carcelia lucorum (Meigen 1824)
  - Compsilura concinnata (Meigen 1824)
  - Cylindromyia brassicaria (Fabricius 1775)
  - Cyzenis albicans (Fallén, 1810)
  - Dexiosoma caninum (Fabricius, 1781)
  - Eriothrix rufomaculata (DeGeer, 1776)
  - Eurithia anthophila (Robineau-Desvoidy, 1830)
  - Eurithia connivens Zetterstedt, 1844
  - Exorista larvarum (Linnaeus, 1758)
  - Gonia capitata (De Geer, 1776)
  - Gonia picea (Robineau-Desvoidy, 1830)
  - Gymnocheta viridis (Fallén, 1810)
  - Linnaemya vulpina (Fallén, 1810)
  - Loewia foeda (Meigen 1824)
  - Lophosia fasciata Meigen, 1824
  - Lydella stabulans (Meigen 1824)
  - Lydina aenea (Meigen, 1824)
  - Lypha dubia (Fallén, 1810)
  - Macquartia dispar (Fallén, 1820)
  - Macquartia grisea (Fallén, 1810)
  - Medina collaris (Fallen 1820)
  - Nilea hortulana (Meigen 1824)
  - Pales pavida (Meigen 1824)
  - Phasia hemiptera (Fabricius, 1794)
  - Phasia obesa (Fabricius, 1798)
  - Phryxe nemea (Meigen, 1824)
  - Phryxe vulgaris (Fallen 1810)
  - Phytomyptera nigrina (Meigen 1824)
  - Platymya fimbriata (Meigen 1824)
  - Prosena siberita (Fabricius 1775)
  - Siphona geniculata (De Geer 1776)
  - Siphona maculata Zetterstedt, 1849
  - Tachina fera (Linnaeus 1761)
  - Tachina grossa (Linnaeus 1758)
  - Thelaira nigripes (Fallén, 1817)
  - Voria ruralis (Fallen 1810)
  - Campylocheta inepta Meigen, 1824
- Oestridae (bot flies, warble flies, heel flies, gadflies) 6 species including
  - Cephenemyia stimulator (Clark 1851)
  - Gasterophilus intestinalis (De Geer 1776)
  - Hypoderma bovis (Linnaeus 1758)
  - Hypoderma lineatum (Villers 1789)
  - Oestrus ovis Linnaeus 1758

== Identification and descriptions, line drawings ==
Faune de France Bibliotheque-virtuelle-numerique Titles available as free pdf

- Séguy, E., 1923. Diptères Anthomyides. 393 p., 813 fig. Faune n° 6
- Pierre, C., 1924. Diptères : Tipulidae. 159 p. Faune n° 8
- Séguy, E., 1926. Diptères Brachycères. 308 p., 685 fig. Faune n° 13
- Séguy, E., 1927. Diptères Asilidae. 188 p., 389 fig. Faune n° 17
- Goetghebuer. M., 1932. Diptères Nématocères Chironomidae. IV. 196 p., 315 fig. Faune n° 23
- Séguy, E., 1934. Diptères (Brachycères). 832 p., 903 fig Faune n° 23 .
- Parent, O., 1938. Diptères Dolichopodidae. 720 p., 1 002 fig. Faune n° 35
- Séguy, E., 1940. Diptères (Nématocères). 367 p., 414 fig. Faune n° 36
