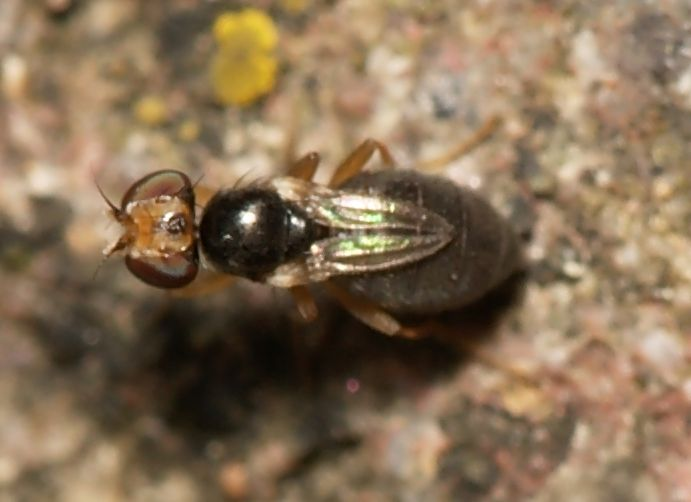
- Stiphrosoma sabulosum short winged form

Scientific classification
- Kingdom: Animalia
- Phylum: Arthropoda
- Clade: Pancrustacea
- Class: Insecta
- Order: Diptera
- Family: Anthomyzidae
- Genus: Stiphrosoma
- Species: S. sabulosum

Binomial name
- Stiphrosoma sabulosum (Haliday 1837)

= Stiphrosoma sabulosum =

Species of fly

Stiphrosoma sabulosum is a species of fly in the family Anthomyzidae. It is found in the Palearctic.
