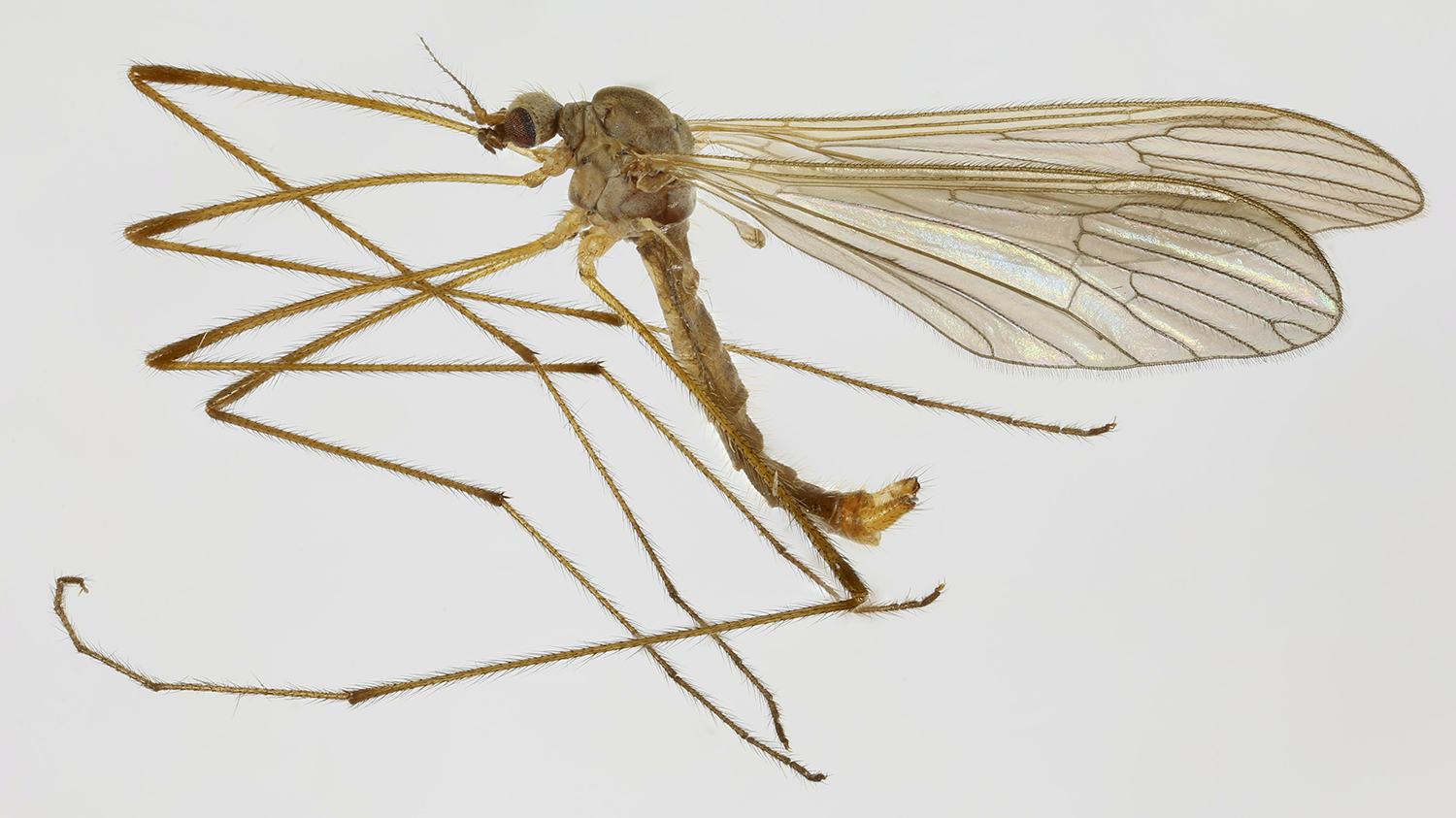
- Dicranophragma separatum North Wales

Scientific classification
- Kingdom: Animalia
- Phylum: Arthropoda
- Clade: Pancrustacea
- Class: Insecta
- Order: Diptera
- Family: Limoniidae
- Genus: Dicranophragma
- Species: D. separatum

Binomial name
- Dicranophragma separatum (Walker, 1848)

= Dicranophragma separatum =

Species of fly

Dicranophragma separatum is a species of fly in the family Limoniidae. It is found in the Palearctic.
