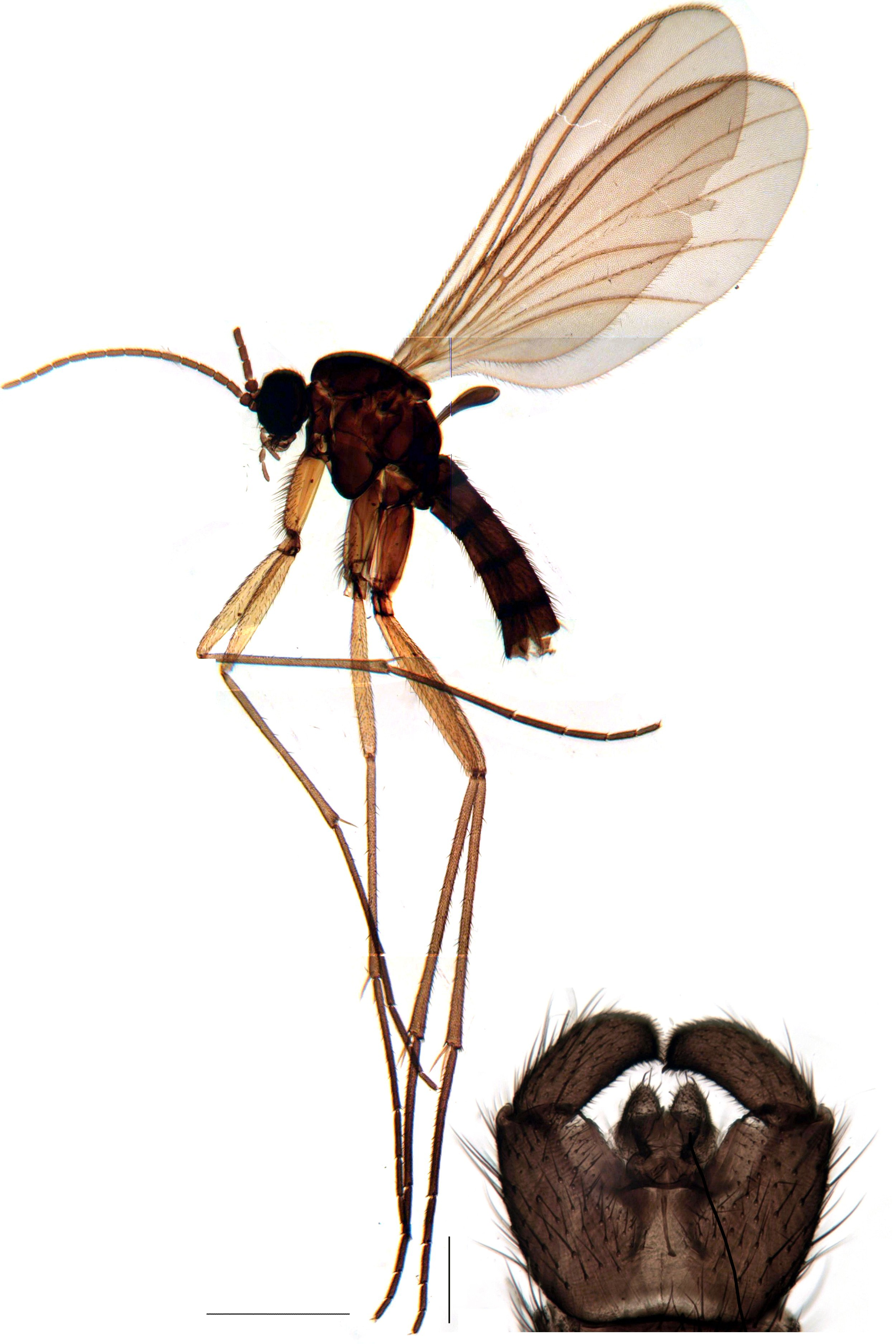

Scientific classification
- Kingdom: Animalia
- Phylum: Arthropoda
- Class: Insecta
- Order: Diptera
- Family: Sciaridae
- Genus: Leptosciarella
- Species: L. pilosa

Binomial name
- Leptosciarella pilosa (Stæger, 1840)

= Leptosciarella pilosa =

Species of fly

Leptosciarella pilosa is a species of fly in the family Sciaridae. It is found in the Palearctic.
