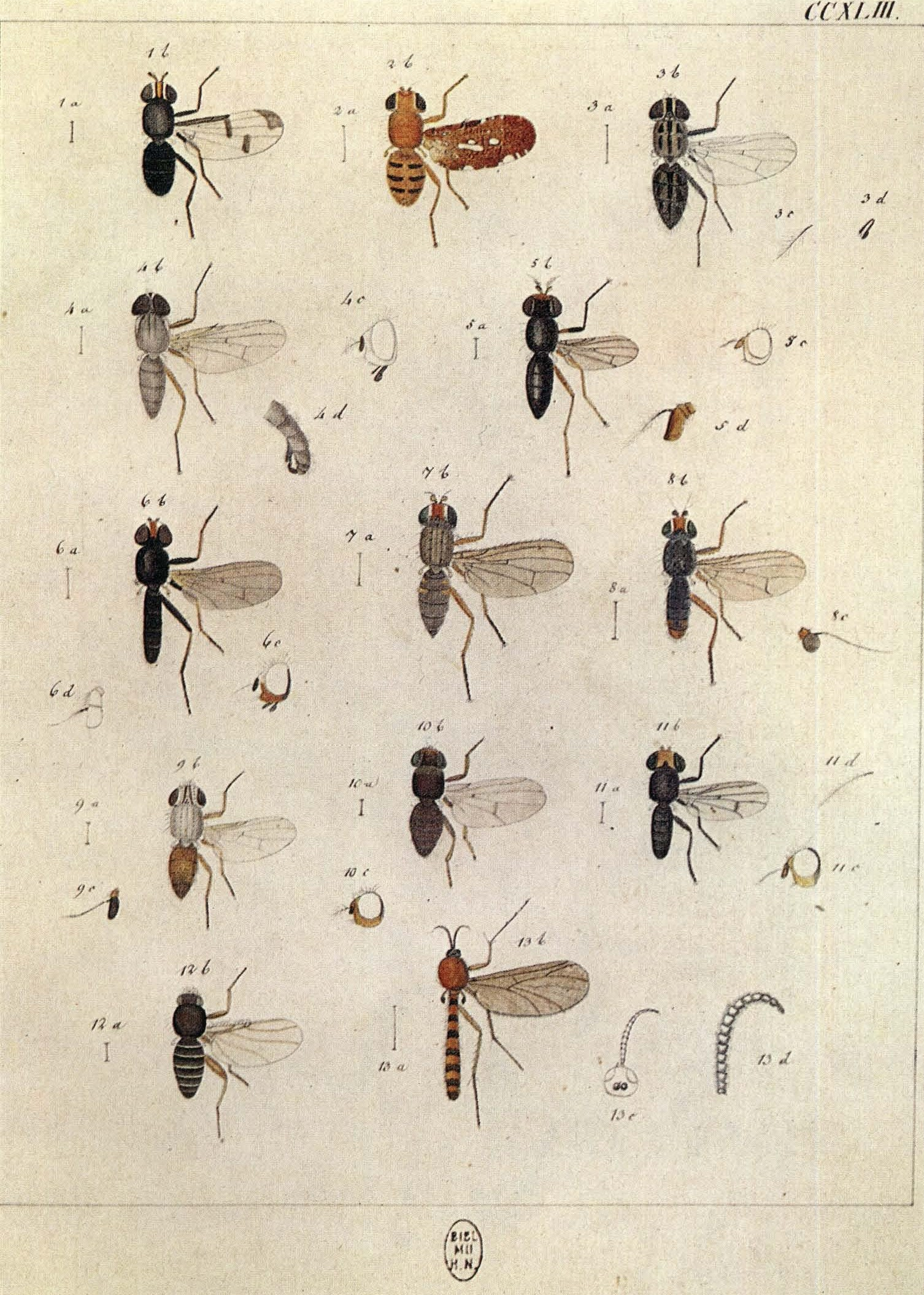
- Morpholeria ruficornis in Meigen Europäischen Zweiflügeligen

Scientific classification
- Kingdom: Animalia
- Phylum: Arthropoda
- Class: Insecta
- Order: Diptera
- Family: Heleomyzidae
- Genus: Morpholeria
- Species: M. ruficornis

Binomial name
- Morpholeria ruficornis (Meigen, 1830)

Synonyms
- Helomyza ruficornis Meigen, 1830

= Morpholeria ruficornis =

Species of fly

Morpholeria ruficornis is a species of fly in the family Heleomyzidae. It is found in the Palearctic.

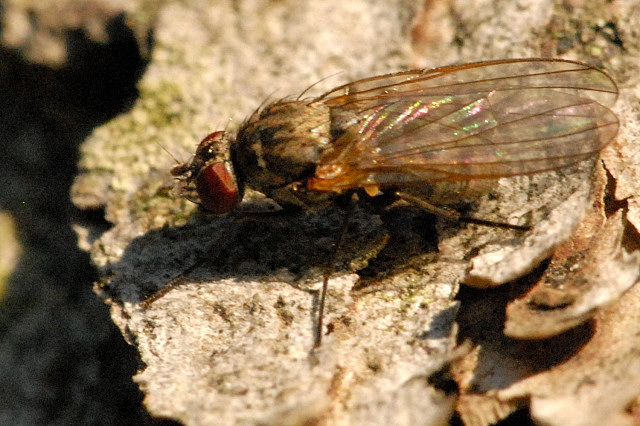

The body length is 3.5 to 5 mm. The antennae have a rounded third segment and the arista is shorter than the height of the head.The thorax bears one pair of dorsocentral setae lying anterior to the transverse suture and one pair of sternopleural setae, The prosternum is bare. The spines on the costa are longer than the setae. The male's posterior legs have three or four setae on the upper side of the femora. In the reproductive organs of males, the aedeagi are composed of two lobes, the front of which is twice as wide as the rear. In females, the abdominal pituitary glands are hairy and devoid of setae.For terms see Morphology of Diptera.

Morpholeria ruficornis is known from Portugal, Andorra, Ireland, Great Britain, France, Belgium, the Netherlands, Germany, Switzerland, Austria, Italy, Denmark, Sweden, Finland, Poland, the Czech Republic, Hungary, Lithuania, Latvia, Ukraine, Romania, Bulgaria, the European part Russia and the Caucasus.
