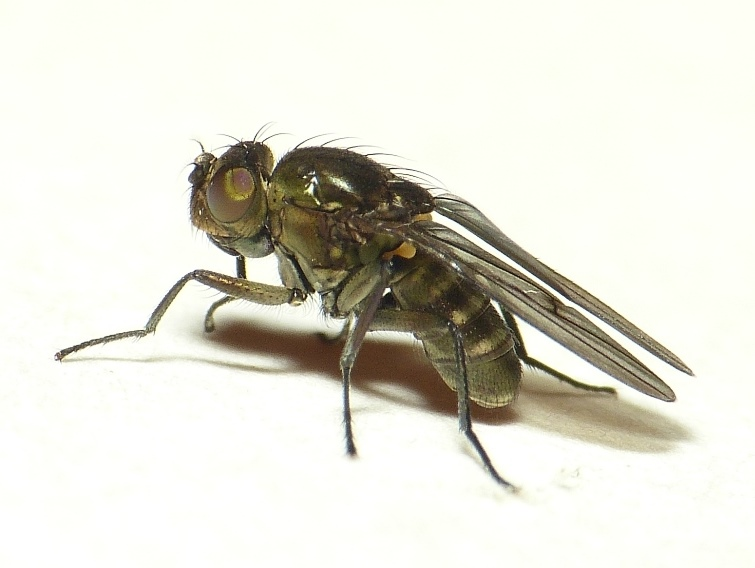
- Paracoenia fumosa Netherlands

Scientific classification
- Kingdom: Animalia
- Phylum: Arthropoda
- Class: Insecta
- Order: Diptera
- Family: Ephydridae
- Genus: Paracoenia
- Species: P. fumosa

Binomial name
- Paracoenia fumosa (Stenhammar, 1844)

Synonyms
- Ephydra angustigenis Becker, 1926

= Paracoenia fumosa =

Species of fly

Paracoenia fumosa is a species of fly in the family Ephydridae. It is found in the Palearctic. Jizz Nervure Rf with 1–3 hairs. Abdomen: tergites with transverse grey green bands. Long. : 3,5 mm. May to October. By ponds.
