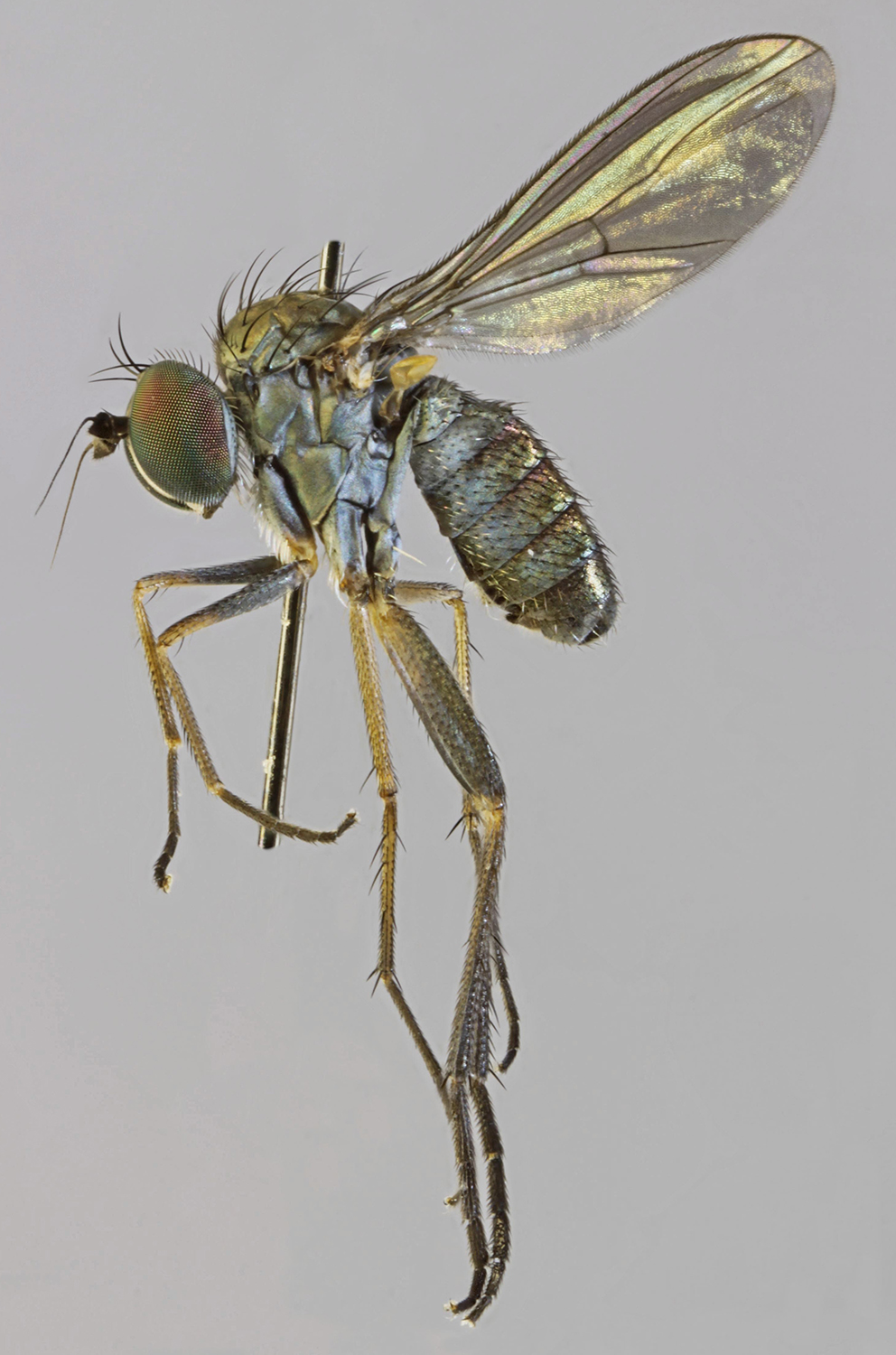
- Sympycnus desoutteri North Wales

Scientific classification
- Kingdom: Animalia
- Phylum: Arthropoda
- Class: Insecta
- Order: Diptera
- Family: Dolichopodidae
- Genus: Sympycnus
- Species: S. desoutteri

Binomial name
- Sympycnus desoutteri Parent, 1925

= Sympycnus desoutteri =

Species of fly

Sympycnus desoutteri is a species of fly in the family Dolichopodidae. It is found in the Palearctic.
