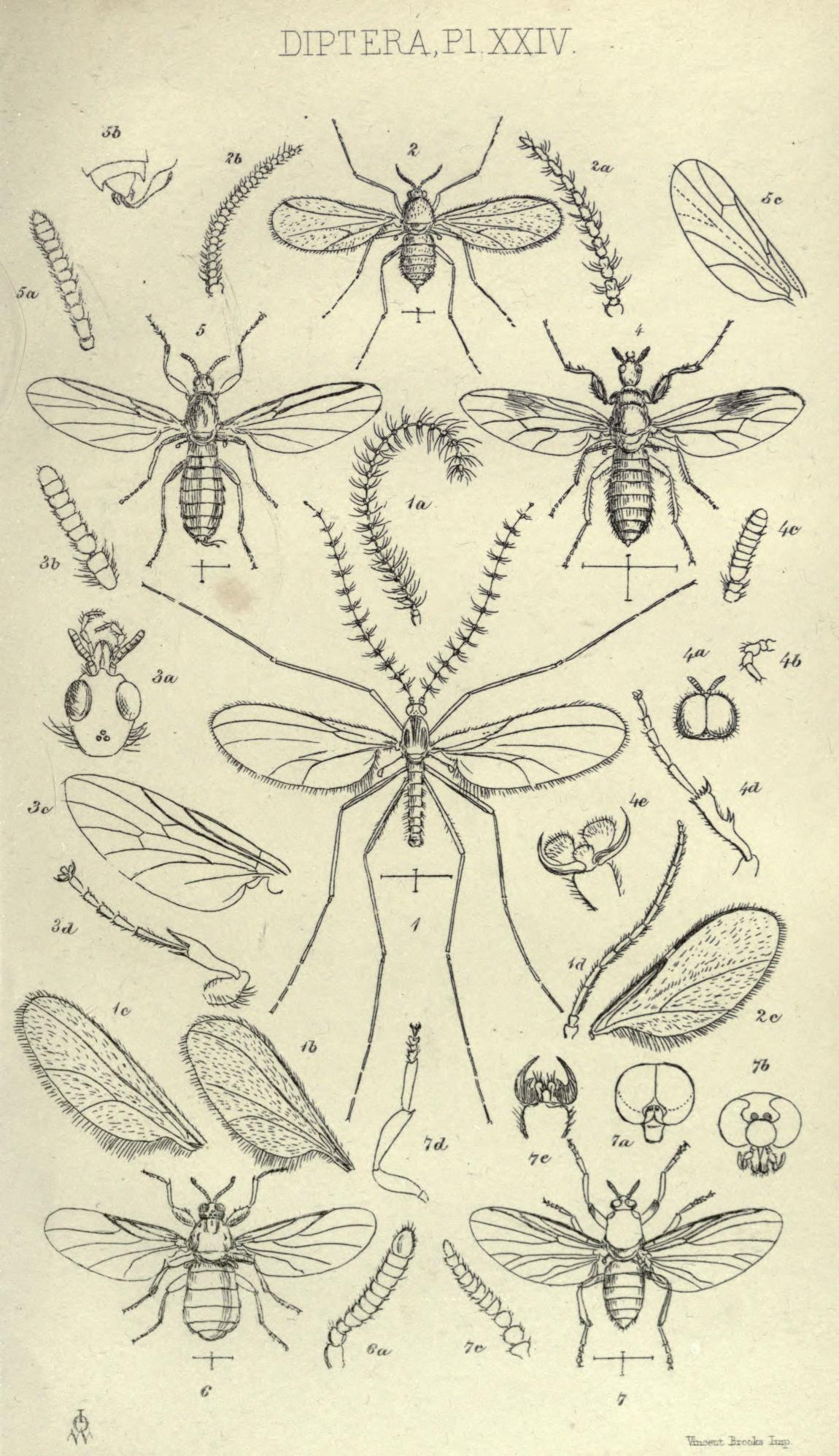
- Figure (5,5a,5b accompanying original description

Scientific classification
- Kingdom: Animalia
- Phylum: Arthropoda
- Class: Insecta
- Order: Diptera
- Family: Scatopsidae
- Genus: Apiloscatopse
- Species: A. bifilata

Binomial name
- Apiloscatopse bifilata (Haliday in Walker 1856)

= Apiloscatopse bifilata =

Species of fly

Apiloscatopse bifilata is a species of fly in the family Scatopsidae. It is found in the Palearctic. Described from specimens in Haliday's collection. The type locality is likely Ireland.
