= Apiloscatopse scutellata =

Scientific classification
- Kingdom: Animalia
- Phylum: Arthropoda
- Class: Insecta
- Order: Diptera
- Family: Scatopsidae
- Genus: Apiloscatopse
- Species: A. scutellata

Binomial name
- Apiloscatopse scutellata (Loew, 1846)

Species of fly

Apiloscatopse scutellata is a species of fly in the family Scatopsidae. It is found in the Palearctic.
