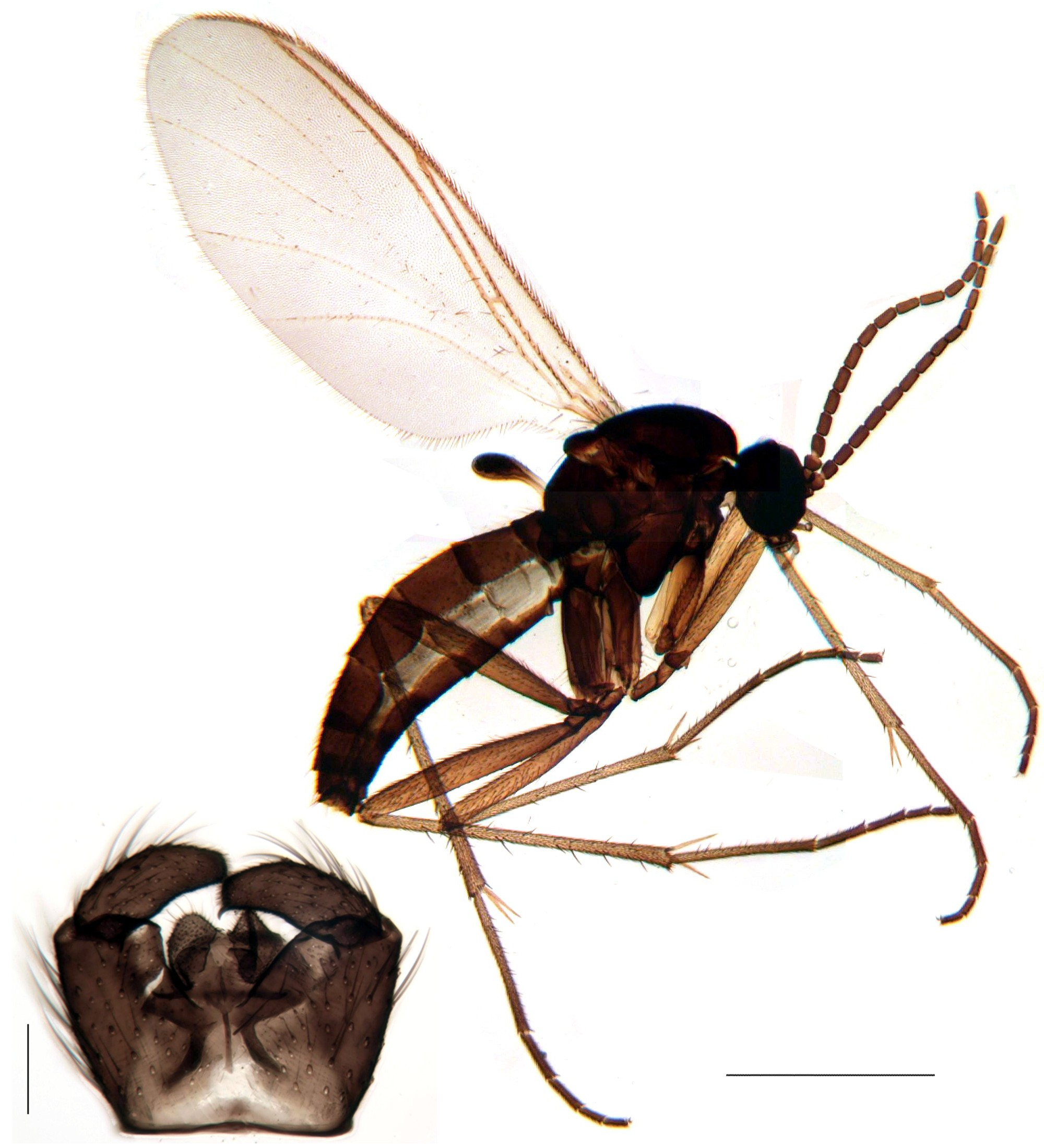

Scientific classification
- Domain: Eukaryota
- Kingdom: Animalia
- Phylum: Arthropoda
- Class: Insecta
- Order: Diptera
- Family: Sciaridae
- Genus: Leptosciarella
- Species: L. trochanterata

Binomial name
- Leptosciarella trochanterata (Zetterstedt, 1851)

= Leptosciarella trochanterata =

Species of fly

Leptosciarella trochanterata is a species of fly in the family Sciaridae. It is found in the Palearctic.
