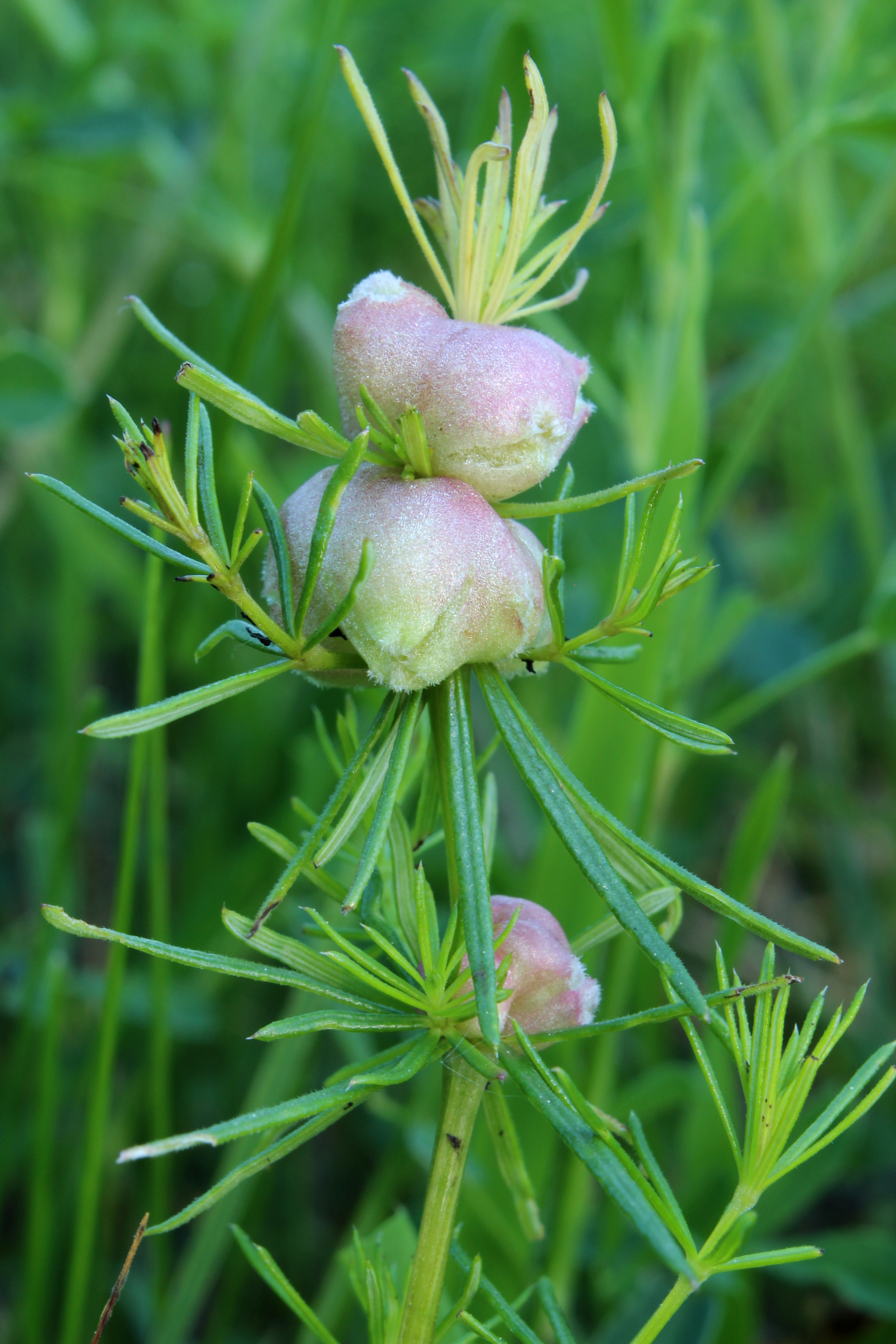
- Rondaniola bursaria Gall on Galium sp.

Scientific classification
- Kingdom: Animalia
- Phylum: Arthropoda
- Class: Insecta
- Order: Diptera
- Family: Cecidomyiidae
- Genus: Geocrypta
- Species: G. galii

Binomial name
- Geocrypta galii (Loew, 1850)

= Geocrypta galii =

Species of fly

Geocrypta galii is a species of fly in the family Cecidomyiidae. It is found in the Palearctic. The larvae gall Rubiaceae.
