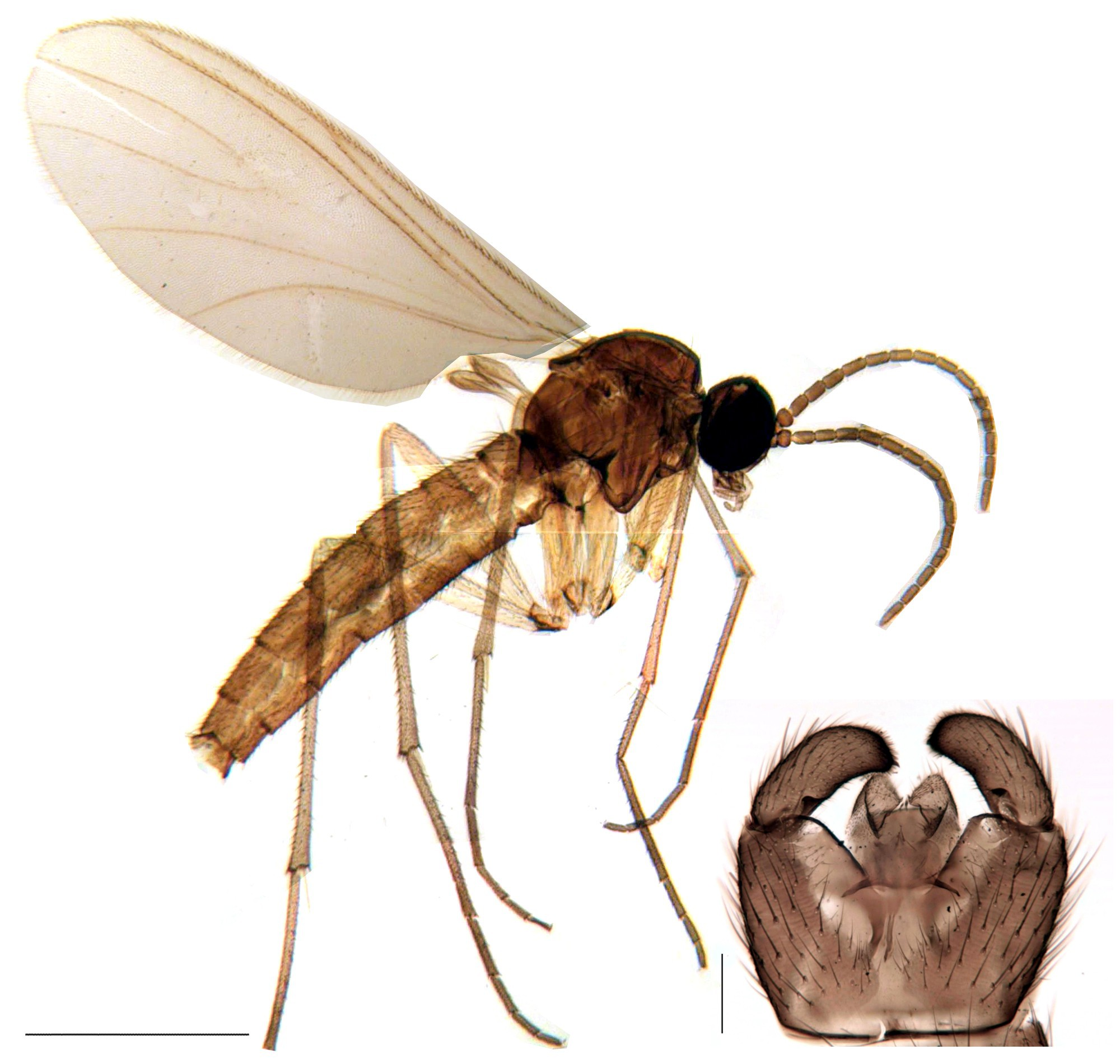

Scientific classification
- Domain: Eukaryota
- Kingdom: Animalia
- Phylum: Arthropoda
- Class: Insecta
- Order: Diptera
- Family: Sciaridae
- Genus: Leptosciarella
- Species: L. subspinulosa

Binomial name
- Leptosciarella subspinulosa Edwards, 1925

= Leptosciarella subspinulosa =

Species of fly

Leptosciarella subspinulosa is a species of fly in the family Sciaridae. It is found in the Palearctic.
