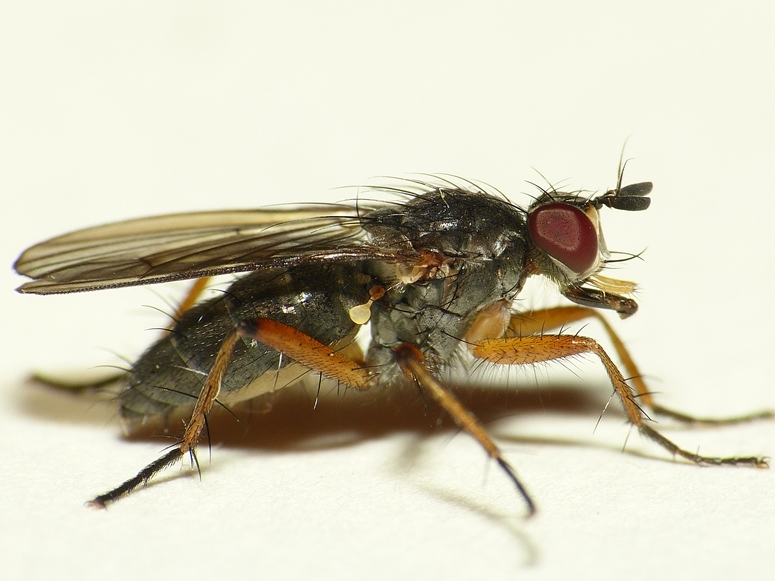
- Cleigastra apicalis Netherlands

Scientific classification
- Kingdom: Animalia
- Phylum: Arthropoda
- Clade: Pancrustacea
- Class: Insecta
- Order: Diptera
- Family: Scathophagidae
- Genus: Cleigastra
- Species: C. apicalis

Binomial name
- Cleigastra apicalis (Meigen, 1826)

= Cleigastra apicalis =

Species of fly

Cleigastra apicalis is a species of fly in the family Scathophagidae. It is found in the Palearctic.
