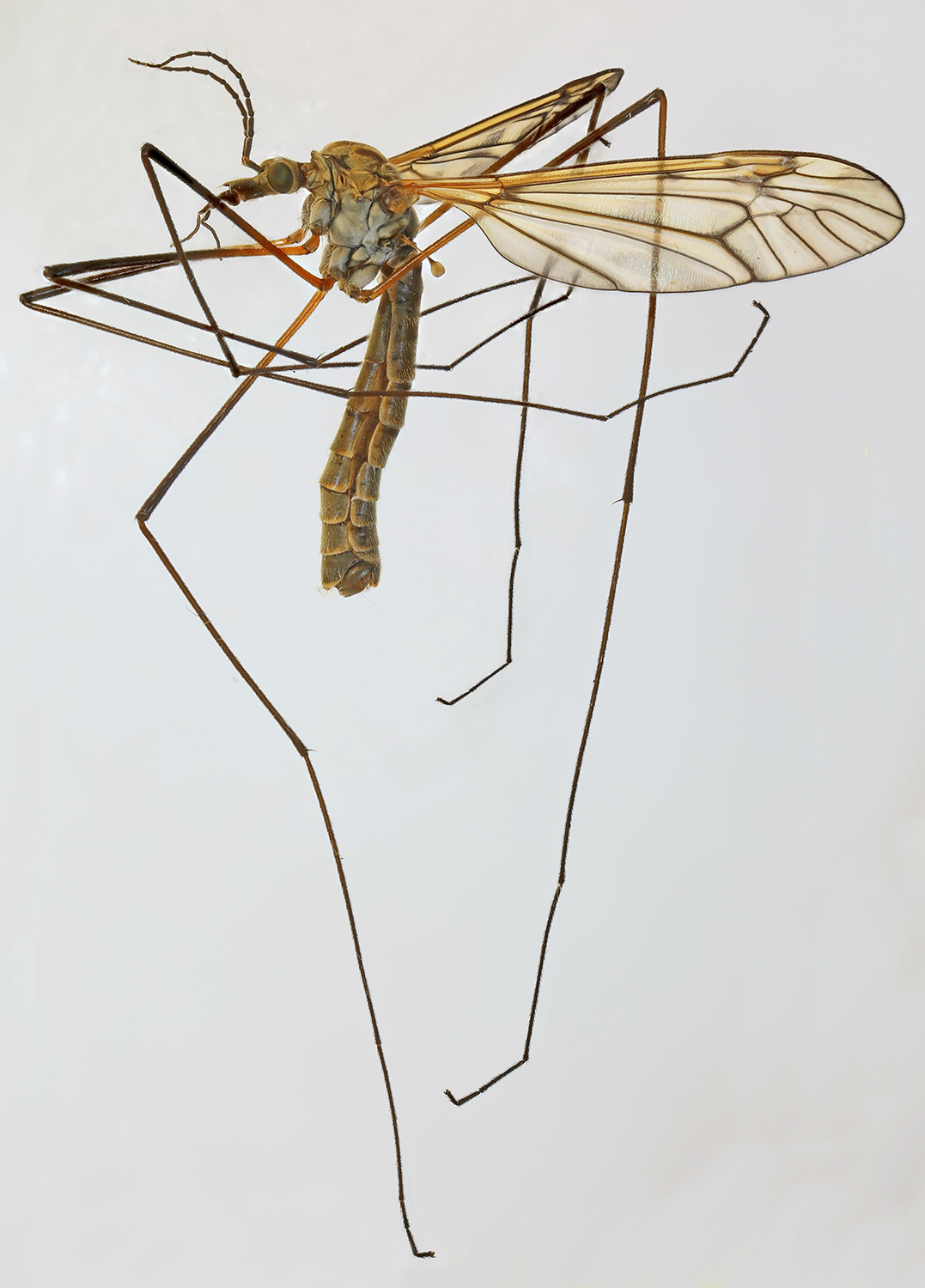
- Tipula varipennis North Wales

Scientific classification
- Kingdom: Animalia
- Phylum: Arthropoda
- Clade: Pancrustacea
- Class: Insecta
- Order: Diptera
- Family: Tipulidae
- Genus: Tipula
- Subgenus: Pterelachisus
- Species: T. varipennis

Binomial name
- Tipula varipennis Meigen, 1818

= Tipula varipennis =

Species of fly

Tipula varipennis is a species of fly in the family Tipulidae. It is found in the Palearctic.
