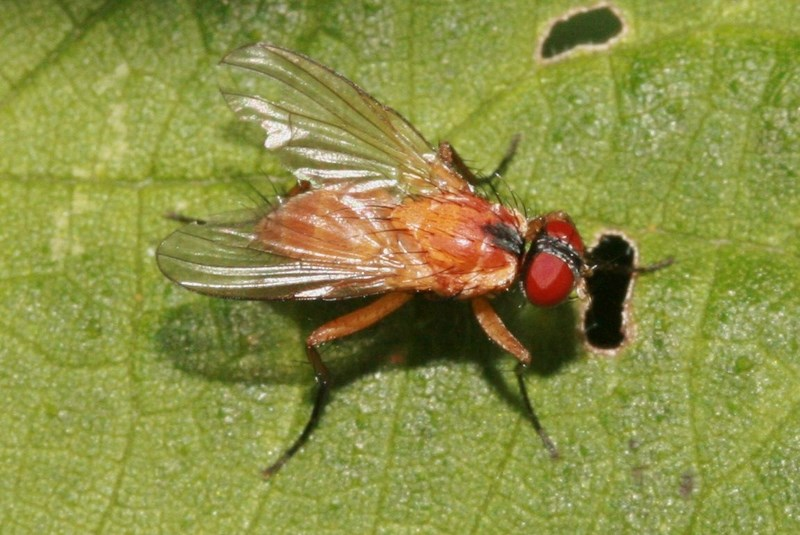
- Achanthiptera rohrelliformis Netherlands

Scientific classification
- Kingdom: Animalia
- Phylum: Arthropoda
- Class: Insecta
- Order: Diptera
- Family: Muscidae
- Genus: Achanthiptera
- Species: A. rohrelliformis

Binomial name
- Achanthiptera rohrelliformis (Robineau-Desvoidy, 1830)

= Achanthiptera rohrelliformis =

Species of wasp

Achanthiptera rohrelliformis is a fly from the family Muscidae. It is found in the Palearctic. The larvae are found in the nests of wasps and hornets where they feed upon organic remains and the dead carcasses of the wasps and their larvae.
