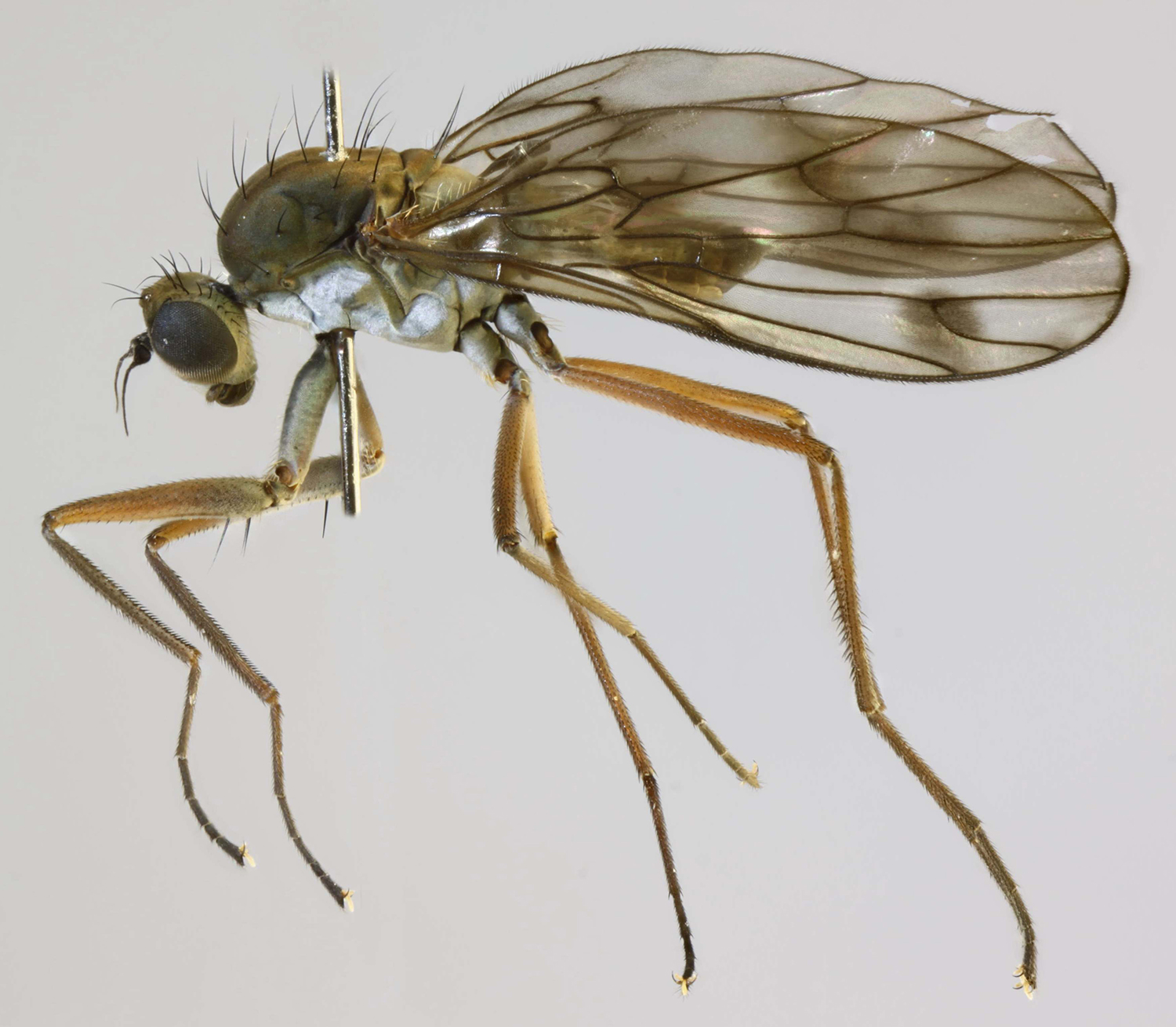
- Clinocera fontinalis North Wales

Scientific classification
- Kingdom: Animalia
- Phylum: Arthropoda
- Class: Insecta
- Order: Diptera
- Family: Empididae
- Genus: Clinocera
- Species: C. fontinalis

Binomial name
- Clinocera fontinalis (Haliday, 1833)

Synonyms
- Heleodromia fontinalis Haliday, 1833

= Clinocera fontinalis =

Species of fly

Clinocera fontinalis is a species of fly in the family Empididae. It is found in the Palearctic.
