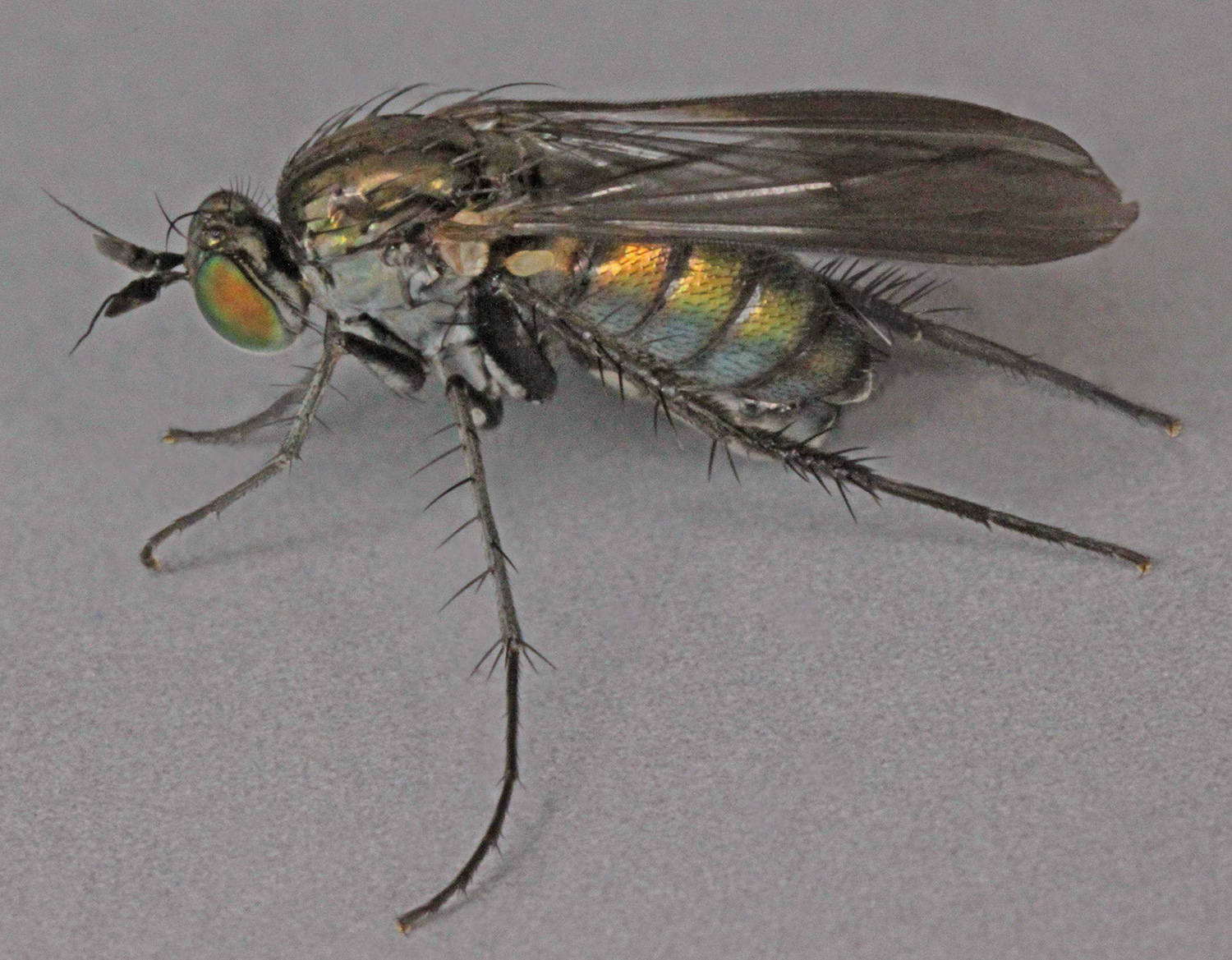
- Dolichopus atratus North Wales

Scientific classification
- Kingdom: Animalia
- Phylum: Arthropoda
- Clade: Pancrustacea
- Class: Insecta
- Order: Diptera
- Family: Dolichopodidae
- Genus: Dolichopus
- Species: D. atratus

Binomial name
- Dolichopus atratus Meigen, 1824

= Dolichopus atratus =

Species of fly

Dolichopus atratus is a species of fly in the family Dolichopodidae. It is found in the Palearctic.
