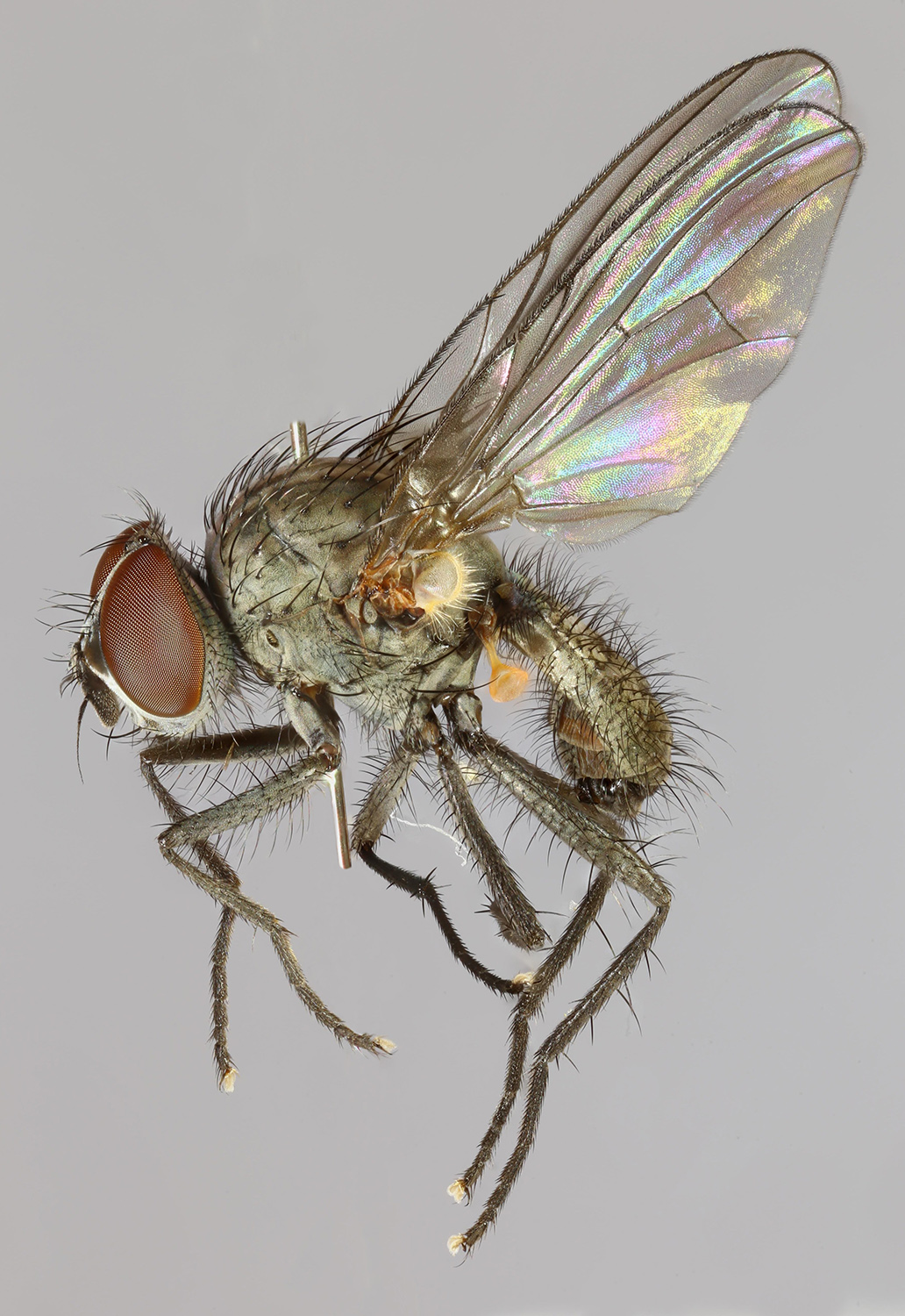
- Paradelia intersecta North Wales.

Scientific classification
- Kingdom: Animalia
- Phylum: Arthropoda
- Class: Insecta
- Order: Diptera
- Family: Anthomyiidae
- Genus: Paradelia
- Species: P. intersecta

Binomial name
- Paradelia intersecta (Meigen, 1826)

Synonyms
- Hylemyia mouillei Seguy, 1944; Anthomyia guintilis Pandelle, 1900; Phorbia neglecta Meade, 1883; Chortophila pilosella Rondani, 1877

= Paradelia intersecta =

Species of fly

Paradelia intersecta is a species of fly in the family Anthomyiidae. It is found in the Palearctic. For identification see
