= Leiomyza scatophagina =

Scientific classification
- Kingdom: Animalia
- Phylum: Arthropoda
- Class: Insecta
- Order: Diptera
- Family: Asteiidae
- Genus: Leiomyza
- Species: L. scatophagina

Binomial name
- Leiomyza scatophagina (Fallen, 1823)

Species of fly

Leiomyza scatophagina is a species of fly in the family Asteiidae. It is found in the Palearctic.

Leiomyza scathophagina video
