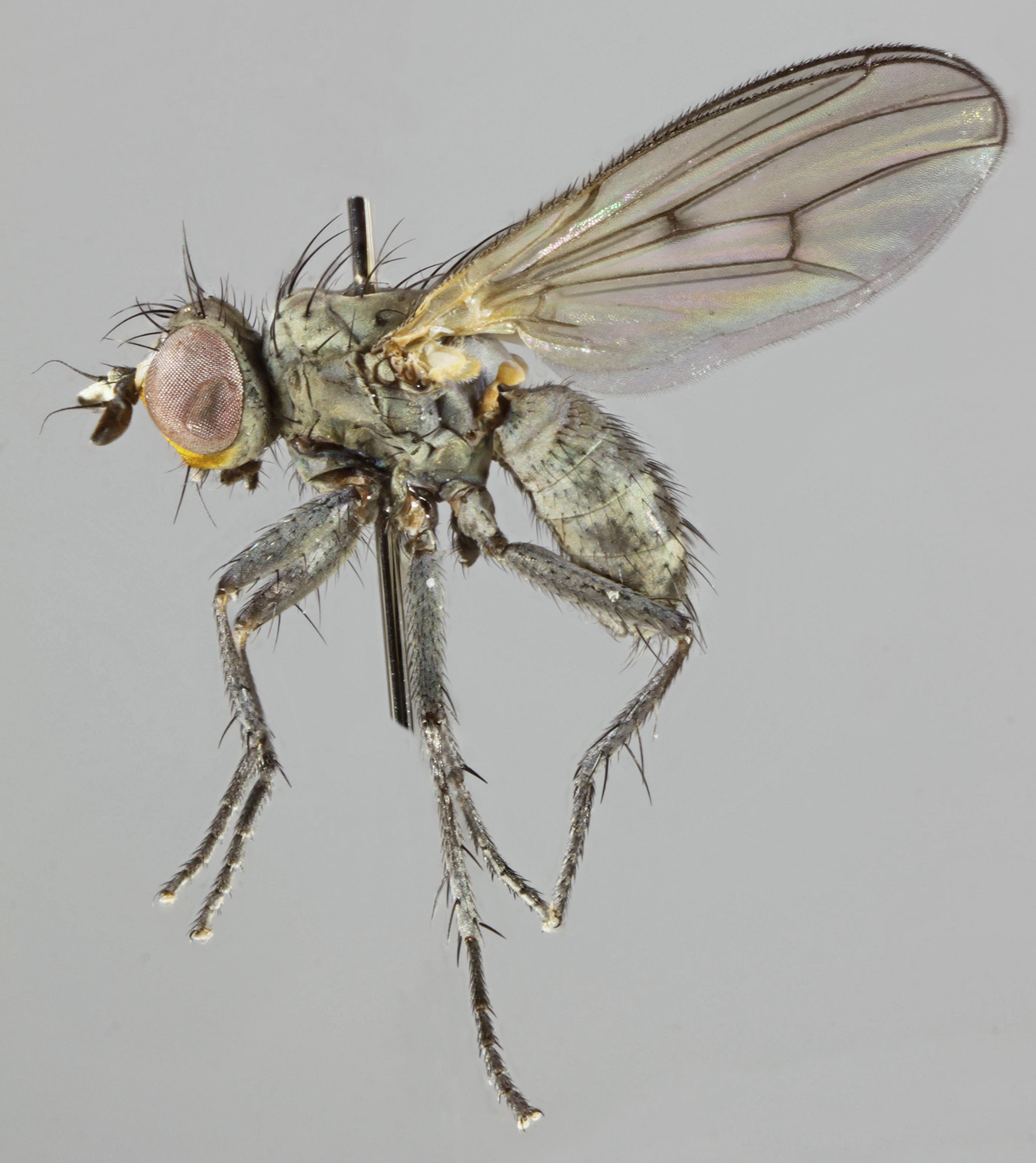
- Schoenomyza litorella North Wales

Scientific classification
- Kingdom: Animalia
- Phylum: Arthropoda
- Clade: Pancrustacea
- Class: Insecta
- Order: Diptera
- Family: Muscidae
- Genus: Schoenomyza
- Species: S. litorella

Binomial name
- Schoenomyza litorella (Fallen, 1823)

= Schoenomyza litorella =

Species of fly

Schoenomyza litorella is a fly from the family Muscidae. It is found in the Palearctic.
