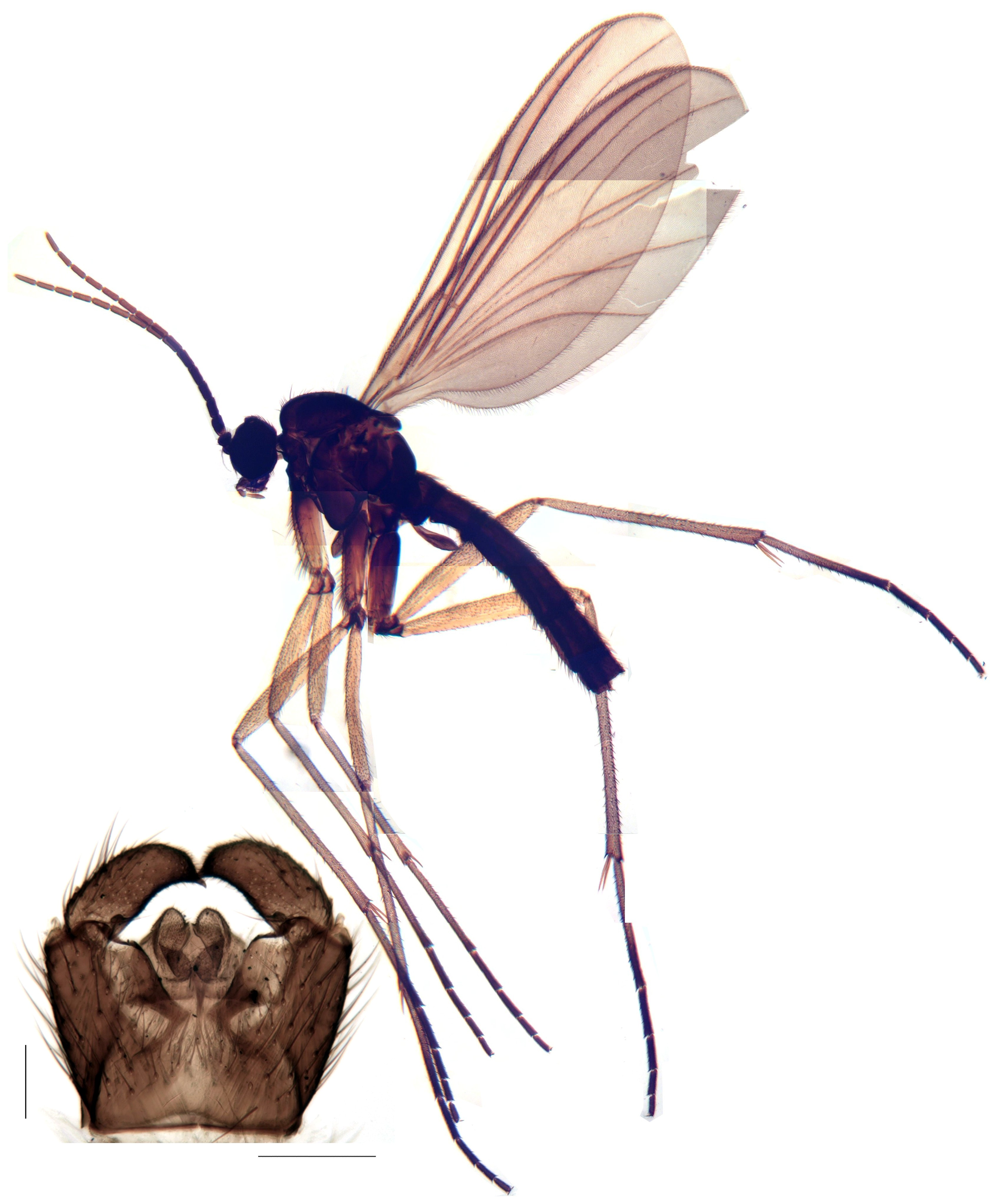

Scientific classification
- Domain: Eukaryota
- Kingdom: Animalia
- Phylum: Arthropoda
- Class: Insecta
- Order: Diptera
- Family: Sciaridae
- Genus: Leptosciarella
- Species: L. yerburyi

Binomial name
- Leptosciarella yerburyi (Freeman 1983)

= Leptosciarella yerburyi =

Species of fly

Leptosciarella yerburyi is a species of fly in the family Sciaridae. It is found in the Palearctic.

It is named after the collector of the type specimen, John William Yerbury.
