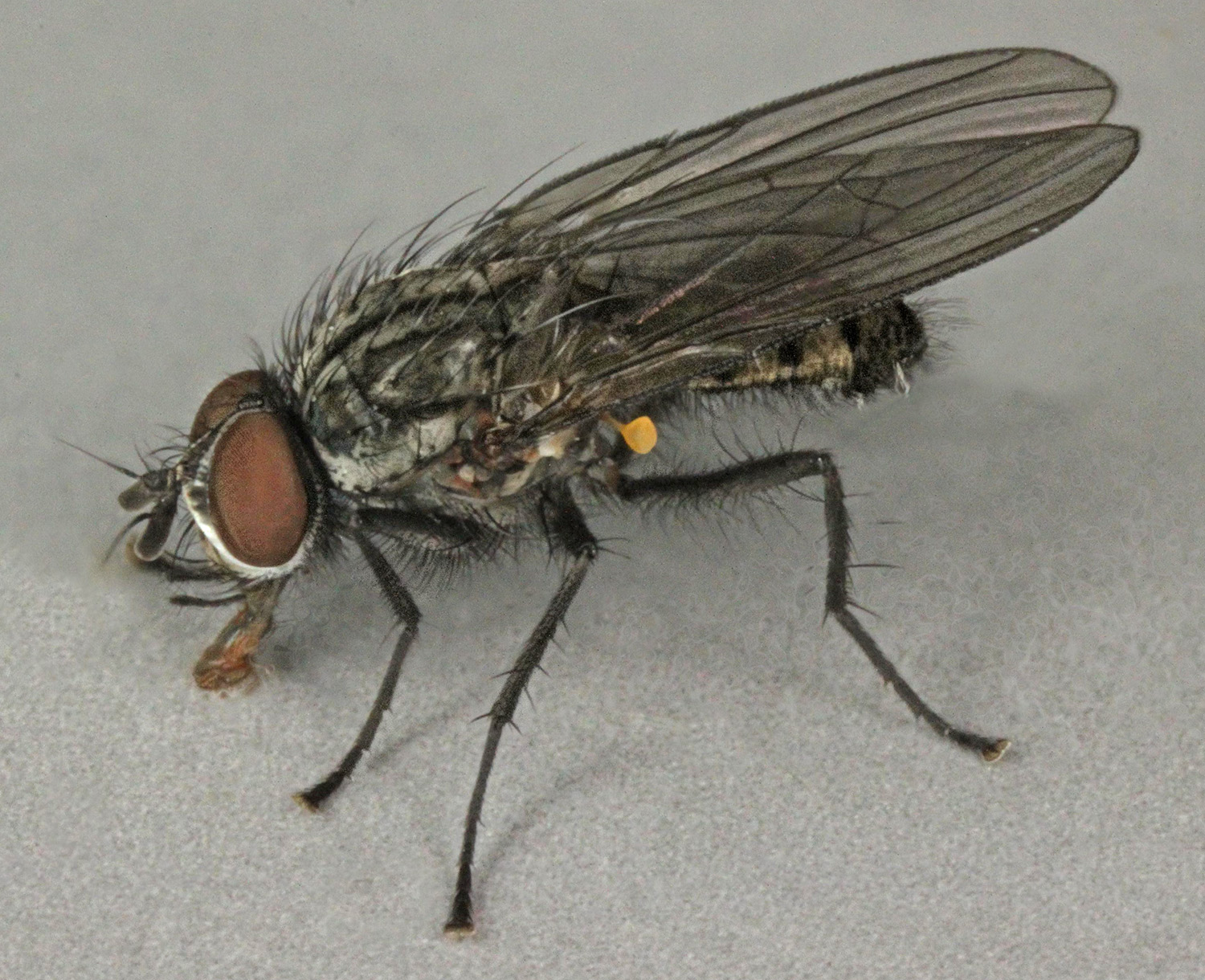
- Lasiomma seminitidum North Wales.

Scientific classification
- Kingdom: Animalia
- Phylum: Arthropoda
- Class: Insecta
- Order: Diptera
- Family: Anthomyiidae
- Genus: Lasiomma
- Species: L. seminitidum

Binomial name
- Lasiomma seminitidum (Zetterstedt, 1845)

Synonyms
- Aricia seminitidum Zetterstedt, 1845; Lasiops meadei (Kowarz, 1880); Lasiops adelpha (Kowarz, 1880); Lasiops parviceps (Kowarz, 1880)

= Lasiomma seminitidum =

Species of fly

Lasiomma seminitidum is a species of fly in the family Anthomyiidae. It is found in the Palearctic. For identification see:
