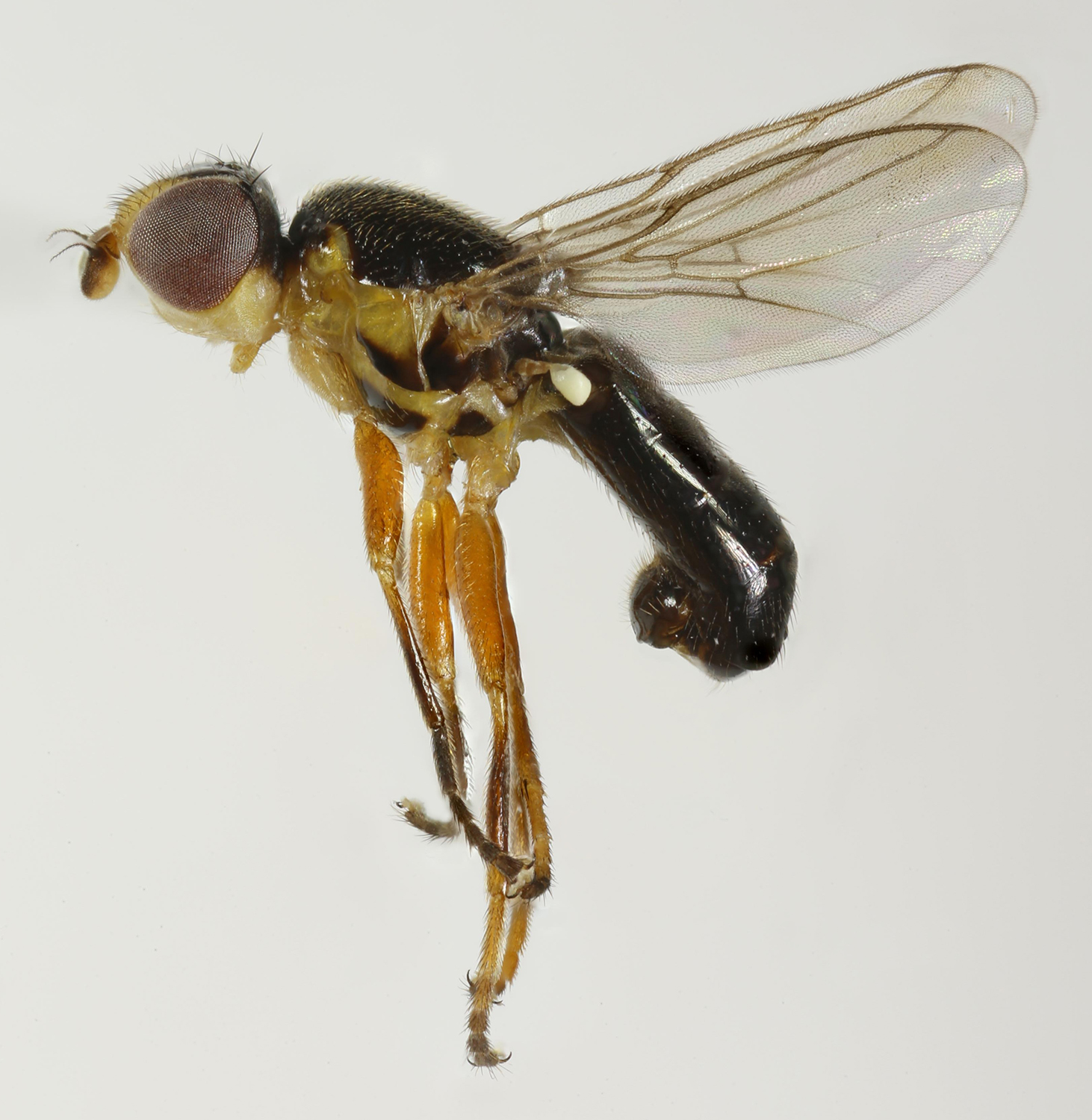
- Cetema elongatum North Wales

Scientific classification
- Kingdom: Animalia
- Phylum: Arthropoda
- Class: Insecta
- Order: Diptera
- Family: Chloropidae
- Genus: Cetema
- Species: C. elongatum

Binomial name
- Cetema elongatum (Meigen, 1830)

Synonyms
- Chlorops elongatum Meigen, 1830

= Cetema elongatum =

Species of fly

Cetema elongatum is a species of fly in the family Chloropidae, the grass flies. It is found in the Palearctic. The larva feeds on Poaceae.
