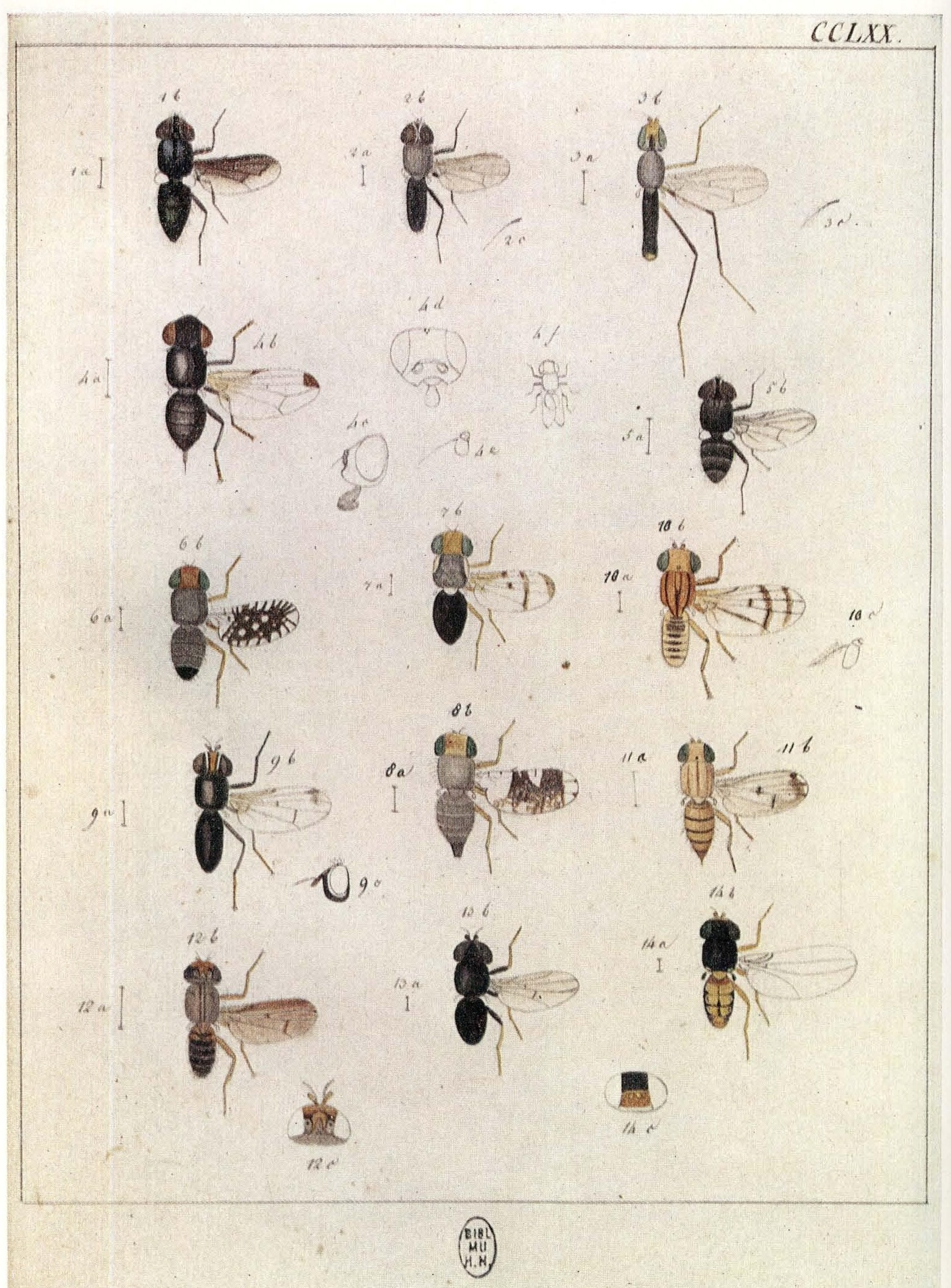
- Asteia amoena in Europäischen Zweiflügeligen (figure 14)

Scientific classification
- Kingdom: Animalia
- Phylum: Arthropoda
- Clade: Pancrustacea
- Class: Insecta
- Order: Diptera
- Family: Asteiidae
- Genus: Asteia
- Species: A. amoena

Binomial name
- Asteia amoena Meigen, 1830

= Asteia amoena =

Species of fly

Asteia amoena is a species of fly in the family Asteiidae. It is found in the Palearctic.

Asteia amoena video
