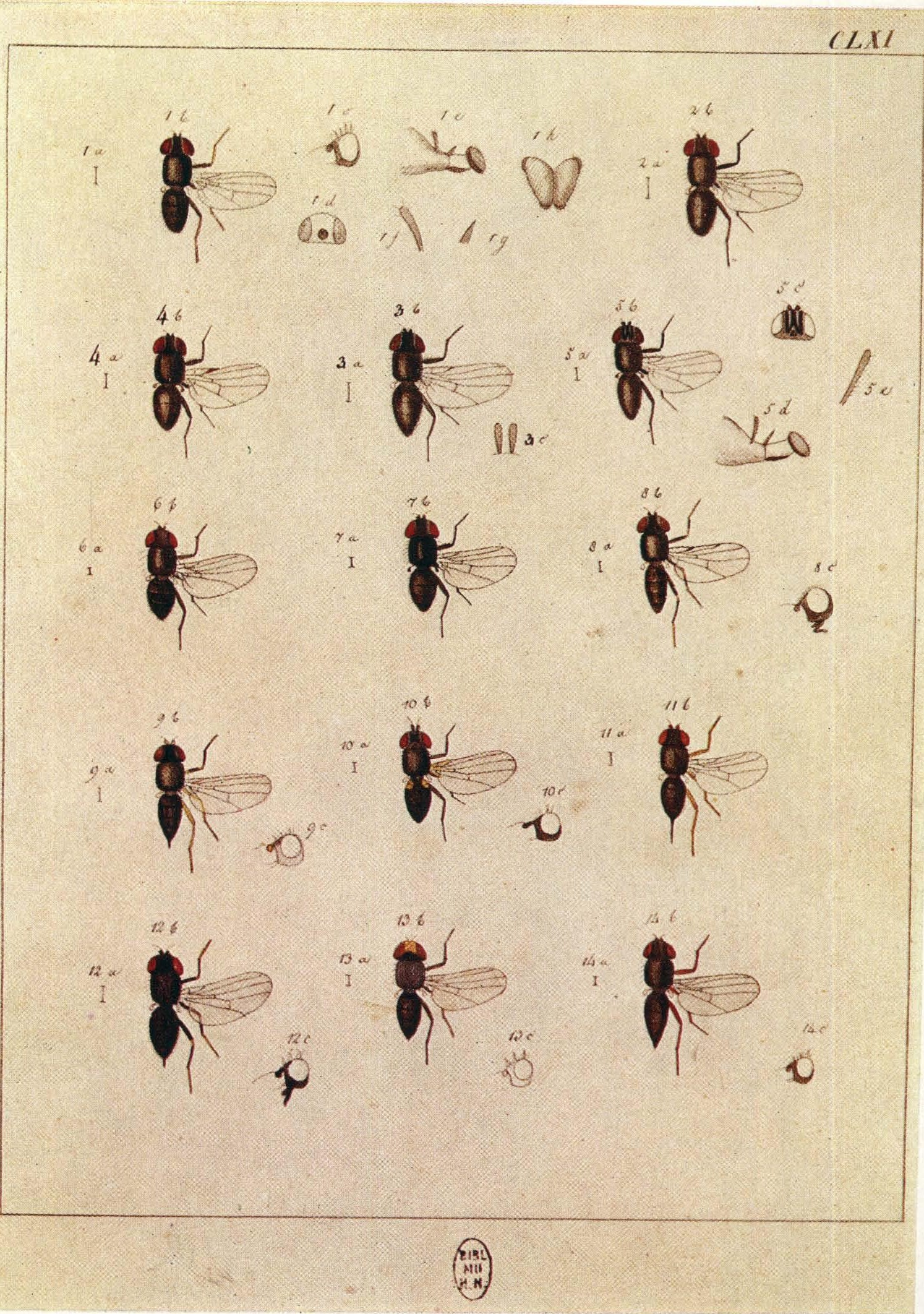
- Leiomyza laevigata in Europäischen Zweiflügeligen(figure 8)

Scientific classification
- Kingdom: Animalia
- Phylum: Arthropoda
- Class: Insecta
- Order: Diptera
- Family: Asteiidae
- Genus: Leiomyza
- Species: L. laevigata

Binomial name
- Leiomyza laevigata (Meigen, 1830)

= Leiomyza laevigata =

Species of fly

Leiomyza laevigata is a species of fly in the family Asteiidae. It is found in the Palearctic.
