= Tephritis admissa =

Scientific classification
- Kingdom: Animalia
- Phylum: Arthropoda
- Clade: Pancrustacea
- Class: Insecta
- Order: Diptera
- Family: Tephritidae
- Genus: Tephritis
- Species: T. admissa

Binomial name
- Tephritis admissa Hering, 1961

Species of fly

Tephritis admissa is a species of fly in the genus Tephritis.
