= Tephritis froloviana =

Scientific classification
- Kingdom: Animalia
- Phylum: Arthropoda
- Clade: Pancrustacea
- Class: Insecta
- Order: Diptera
- Family: Tephritidae
- Genus: Tephritis
- Species: T. froloviana

Binomial name
- Tephritis froloviana Shcherbakov, 2001

Species of fly

Tephritis froloviana is a species of dipteran insect that was first scientifically described by Shcherbakov in 2001.
