= Tephritis pentagonella =

Scientific classification
- Kingdom: Animalia
- Phylum: Arthropoda
- Class: Insecta
- Order: Diptera
- Family: Tephritidae
- Subfamily: Tephritinae
- Tribe: Tephritini
- Genus: Tephritis
- Species: T. pentagonella

Binomial name
- Tephritis pentagonella (Bezzi, 1928)

Synonyms
- Euribia pentagonella Bezzi, 1928

Species of fly

Tephritis pentagonella is a species of tephritid or fruit flies in the genus Tephritis of the family Tephritidae.

It is endemic to Fiji.
