= Tephritis collina =

Scientific classification
- Kingdom: Animalia
- Phylum: Arthropoda
- Class: Insecta
- Order: Diptera
- Family: Tephritidae
- Subfamily: Tephritinae
- Tribe: Tephritini
- Genus: Tephritis
- Species: T. collina

Binomial name
- Tephritis collina Wang, 1990

Species of fly

Tephritis collina is a species of tephritid or fruit flies in the genus Tephritis of the family Tephritidae.

It is found in China.
