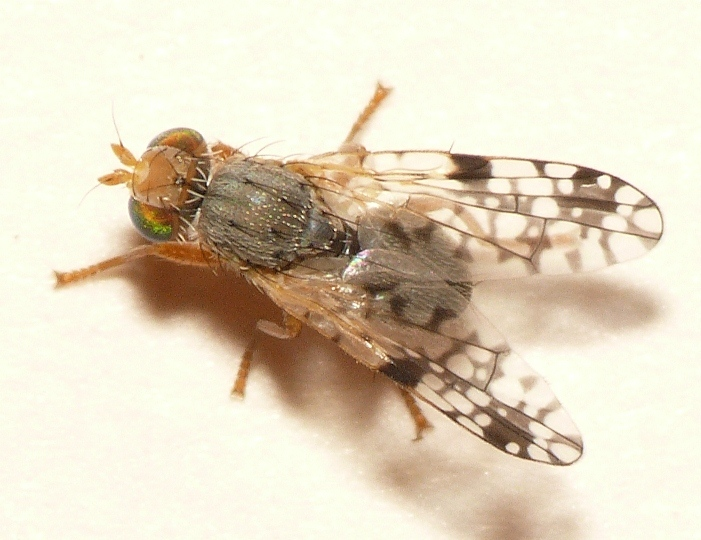

Scientific classification
- Kingdom: Animalia
- Phylum: Arthropoda
- Class: Insecta
- Order: Diptera
- Family: Tephritidae
- Subfamily: Tephritinae
- Tribe: Tephritini
- Genus: Tephritis
- Species: T. dioscurea

Binomial name
- Tephritis dioscurea (Loew, 1856)

Synonyms
- Trypeta dioscurea Loew, 1856; Tephritis dioscurrea Rondani, 1871

= Tephritis dioscurea =

Species of fly

Tephritis dioscurea is a species of tephritid or fruit flies in the genus Tephritis of the family Tephritidae.

It is found in Sweden, France to Kazakhstan, the Caucasus, and east Russia.
