= Tephritis multiguttata =

Scientific classification
- Kingdom: Animalia
- Phylum: Arthropoda
- Class: Insecta
- Order: Diptera
- Family: Tephritidae
- Subfamily: Tephritinae
- Tribe: Tephritini
- Genus: Tephritis
- Species: T. multiguttata

Binomial name
- Tephritis multiguttata (Becker, 1913)

Synonyms
- Euribia multiguttata Becker, 1913

Species of fly

Tephritis multiguttata is a species of tephritid or fruit flies in the genus Tephritis of the family Tephritidae.

It is found in Iran.
