= Tephritis variata =

Scientific classification
- Kingdom: Animalia
- Phylum: Arthropoda
- Class: Insecta
- Order: Diptera
- Family: Tephritidae
- Subfamily: Tephritinae
- Tribe: Tephritini
- Genus: Tephritis
- Species: T. variata

Binomial name
- Tephritis variata (Becker, 1908)

Synonyms
- Urellia variata Becker, 1908

Species of fly

Tephritis variata is a species of tephritid or fruit flies in the genus Tephritis of the family Tephritidae.

It is found in Mongolia and China.
