= Tephritis araneosa =

Scientific classification
- Kingdom: Animalia
- Phylum: Arthropoda
- Class: Insecta
- Order: Diptera
- Family: Tephritidae
- Subfamily: Tephritinae
- Tribe: Tephritini
- Genus: Tephritis
- Species: T. araneosa

Binomial name
- Tephritis araneosa (Coquillett, 1894)

Synonyms
- Trypeta araneosa Coquillett, 1894; Urellia aldrichii Doane, 1899; Urellia pacifica Doane, 1899

Species of fly

Tephritis araneosa is a species of fruit fly in the family Tephritidae.

It is found in the United States, Canada, and Mexico.
