= Tephritis majuscula =

Scientific classification
- Kingdom: Animalia
- Phylum: Arthropoda
- Class: Insecta
- Order: Diptera
- Family: Tephritidae
- Subfamily: Tephritinae
- Tribe: Tephritini
- Genus: Tephritis
- Species: T. majuscula

Binomial name
- Tephritis majuscula Hering & Ito, 1953

Species of fly

Tephritis majuscula is a species of tephritid or fruit flies in the genus Tephritis of the family Tephritidae.

The species is found in Russia and Japan.
