= Tephritis signatipennis =

Scientific classification
- Kingdom: Animalia
- Phylum: Arthropoda
- Class: Insecta
- Order: Diptera
- Family: Tephritidae
- Subfamily: Tephritinae
- Tribe: Tephritini
- Genus: Tephritis
- Species: T. signatipennis

Binomial name
- Tephritis signatipennis Foote, 1960

Species of fly

Tephritis signatipennis is a species of tephritids or fruit flies in the genus Tephritis of the family Tephritidae found in the United States.

It is found in the United States.
