= Tephritis wulpi =

Scientific classification
- Kingdom: Animalia
- Phylum: Arthropoda
- Class: Insecta
- Order: Diptera
- Family: Tephritidae
- Subfamily: Tephritinae
- Tribe: Tephritini
- Genus: Tephritis
- Species: T. wulpi

Binomial name
- Tephritis wulpi Norrbom, 1999

Synonyms
- Euaresta angustipennis Wulp, 1900

Species of fly

Tephritis wulpi is a species of tephritid or fruit flies in the genus Tephritis of the family Tephritidae.

It is found in Mexico.
