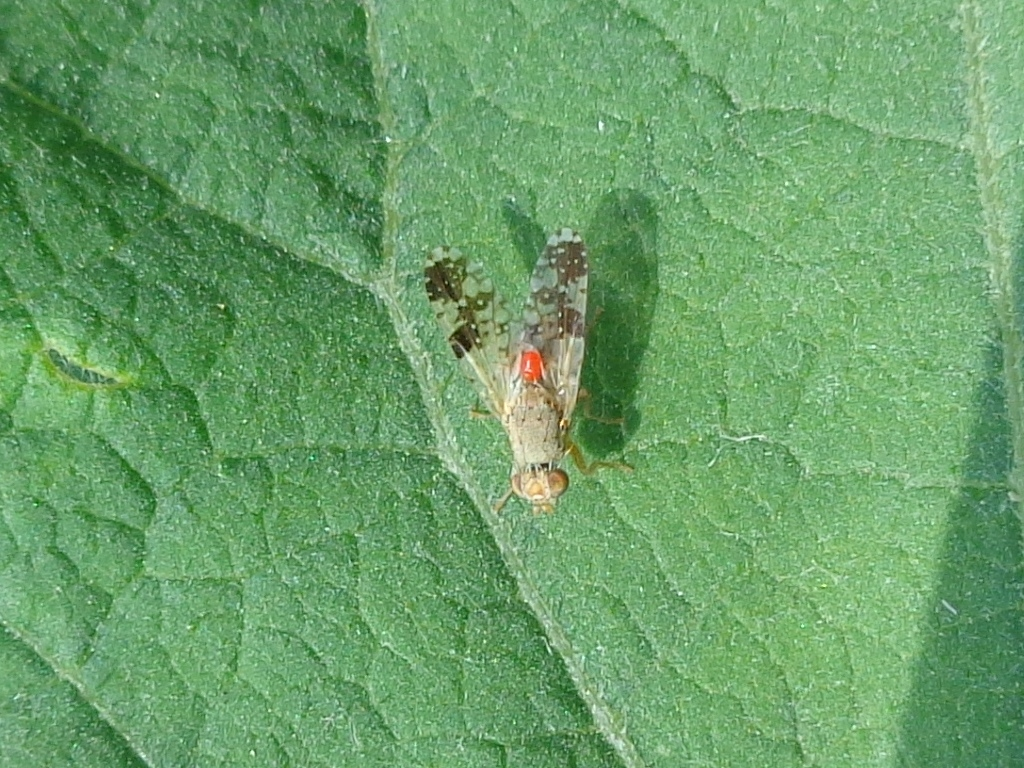
- Tephritis bardanae

Scientific classification
- Kingdom: Animalia
- Phylum: Arthropoda
- Class: Insecta
- Order: Diptera
- Family: Tephritidae
- Subfamily: Tephritinae
- Tribe: Tephritini
- Genus: Tephritis
- Species: T. bardanae

Binomial name
- Tephritis bardanae (Schrank, 1803)

Synonyms
- Trupanea bardanae Schrank, 1803; Trypeta confusa Meigen, 1826; Xyphosia lappae Robineau-Desvoidy, 1830; Xyphosia arvensis Robineau-Desvoidy, 1830

= Tephritis bardanae =

Species of fly

Tephritis bardanae is a picture-winged fly of the family Tephritidae, which are variously known as fruit-flies (North America) or gall flies (Britain and Ireland).

The larvae feed in the flower-heads (capitula) of species of Arctium (burdocks), causing galls to form.

The larvae pupates in autumn, forming a black puparium.

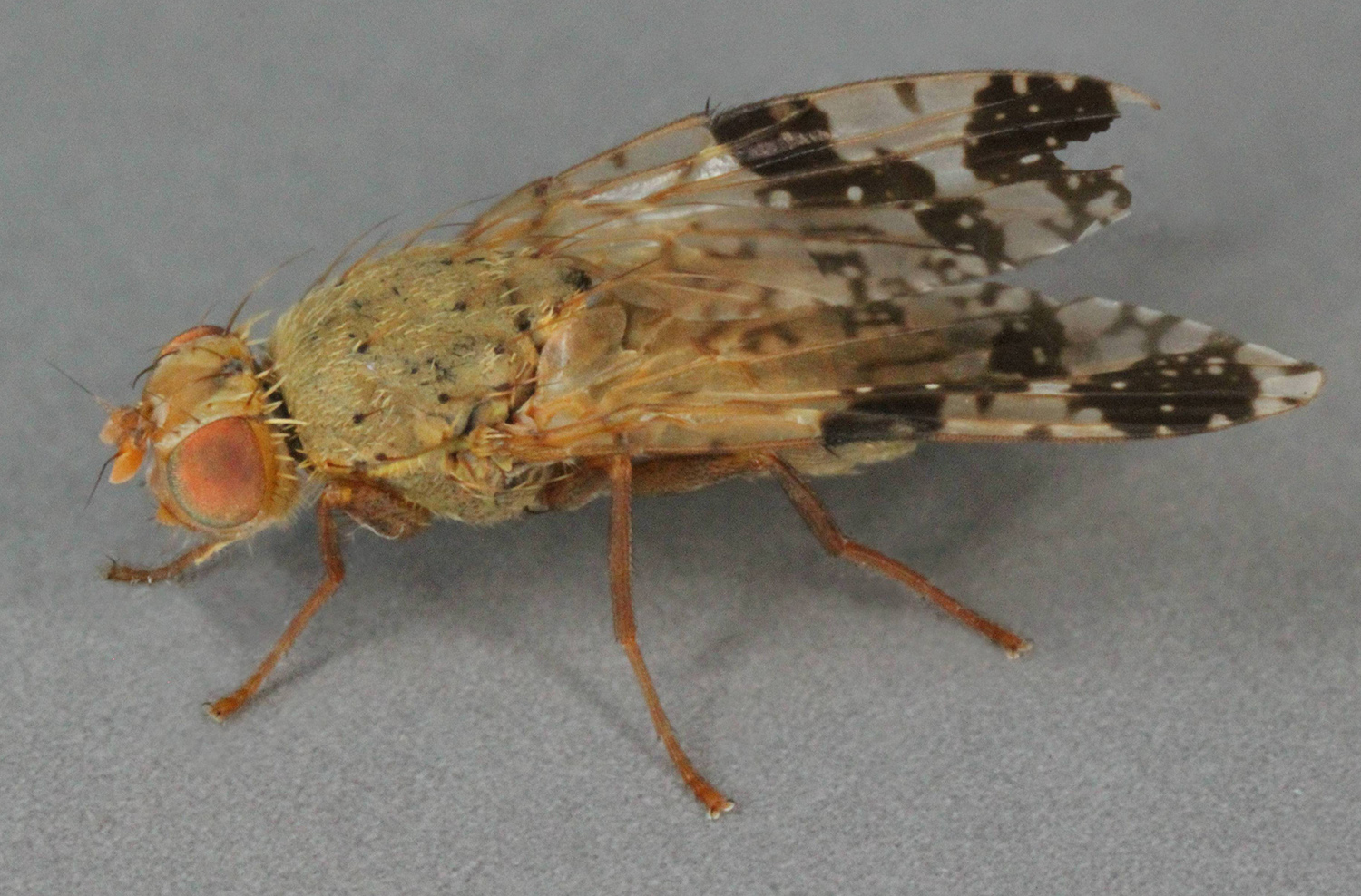
Tephritis bardanae.North Wales

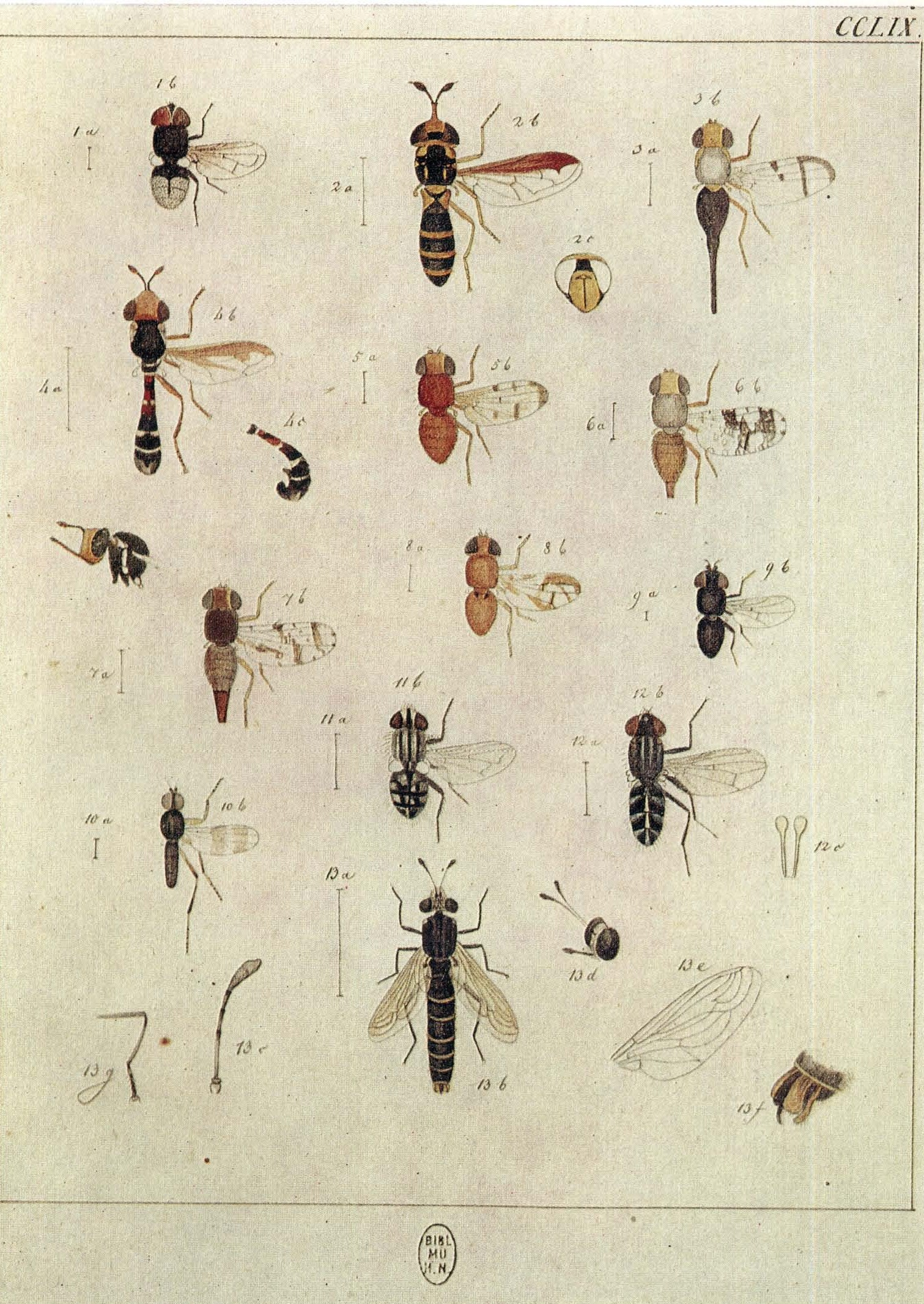
in Meigen Europäischen Zweiflügeligen

== Bibliography ==
- Merz, Bernhard (1994). Diptera Tephritidae. Fauna Helvetica. Vol. 10. Schweizerischen Entomologischen Gesellschaft. p. 198.
