= Tephritis sonchina =

Scientific classification
- Kingdom: Animalia
- Phylum: Arthropoda
- Class: Insecta
- Order: Diptera
- Family: Tephritidae
- Subfamily: Tephritinae
- Tribe: Tephritini
- Genus: Tephritis
- Species: T. sonchina

Binomial name
- Tephritis sonchina Hering, 1937

Synonyms
- Tephritis mandschurica Hering, 1953

Species of fly

Tephritis sonchina is a species of tephritid or fruit flies in the genus Tephritis of the family Tephritidae.

Tephritis sonchina can be found in Russia and China.
