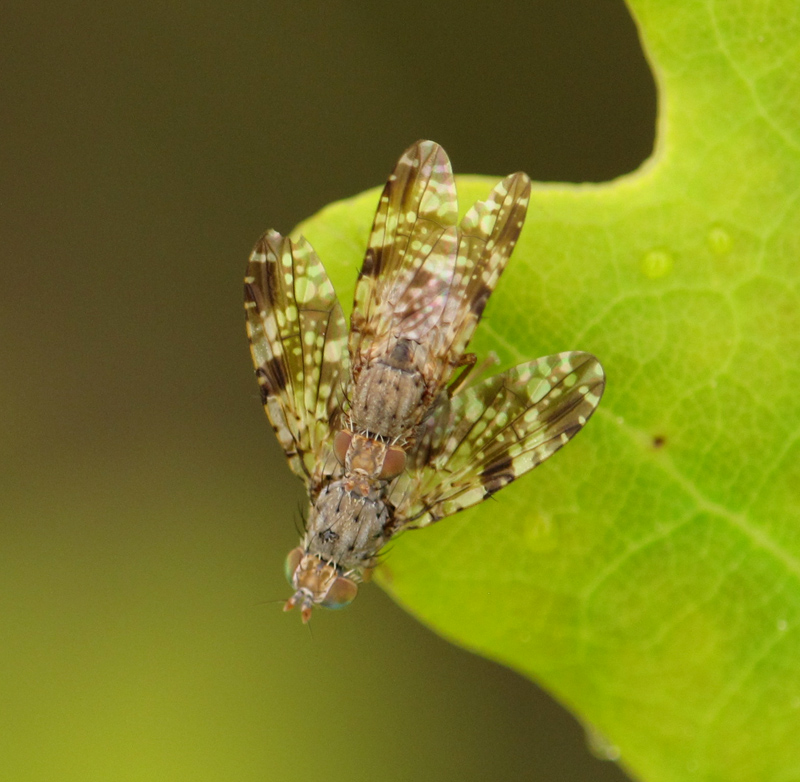
- Tephritis vespertina

Scientific classification
- Kingdom: Animalia
- Phylum: Arthropoda
- Class: Insecta
- Order: Diptera
- Family: Tephritidae
- Subfamily: Tephritinae
- Tribe: Tephritini
- Genus: Tephritis
- Species: T. vespertina

Binomial name
- Tephritis vespertina (Loew, 1844)

Synonyms
- Trypeta vespertina Loew, 1844; Tephritis vespertina f. dajtica Dirlbek & Dirlbek, 1966; Tephritis apicalis Becker, 1907

= Tephritis vespertina =

Species of fly

Tephritis vespertina is a species of tephritid or fruit flies in the genus Tephritis of the family Tephritidae. The larvae feed on Picris echioides.

It is found in Europe, except Sweden and Finland, and south to North Africa.
