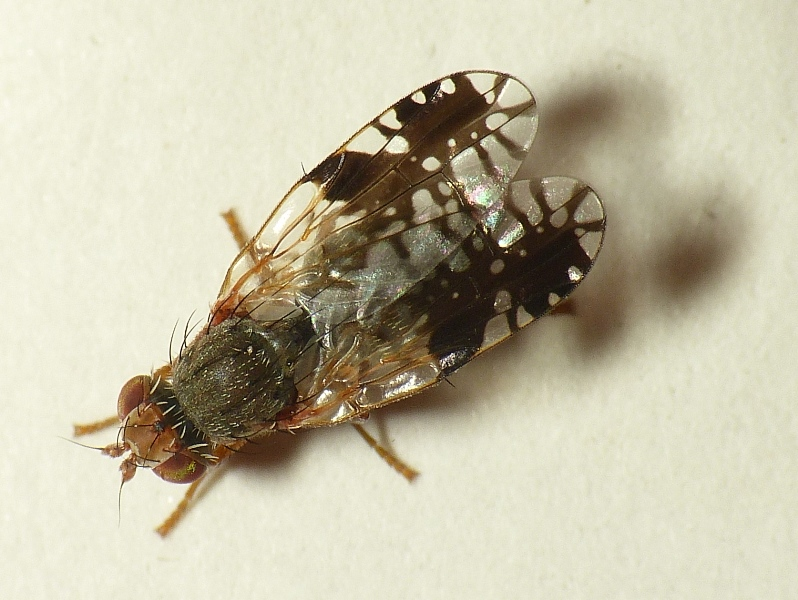

Scientific classification
- Kingdom: Animalia
- Phylum: Arthropoda
- Class: Insecta
- Order: Diptera
- Family: Tephritidae
- Subfamily: Tephritinae
- Tribe: Tephritini
- Genus: Tephritis
- Species: T. separata

Binomial name
- Tephritis separata Rondani, 1871

Synonyms
- Tephritis decipiens Rondani, 1871; Tephritis sejuncta Rondani, 1871; Tephritis conjuncta var. separata Rondani, 1871

= Tephritis separata =

Species of fly

Tephritis separata is a species of tephritid or fruit flies in the genus Tephritis of the family Tephritidae.

It is found in Great Britain, central and south Europe, east to Russia, Kazakhstan, and Israel.
