= Tephritis baccharis =

Scientific classification
- Kingdom: Animalia
- Phylum: Arthropoda
- Class: Insecta
- Order: Diptera
- Family: Tephritidae
- Subfamily: Tephritinae
- Tribe: Tephritini
- Genus: Tephritis
- Species: T. baccharis

Binomial name
- Tephritis baccharis (Coquillett, 1894)

Synonyms
- Icterica fasciata Snow, 1904; Icterica fasciata Adams, 1904

Species of fly

Tephritis baccharis is a species of fruit fly in the family Tephritidae.

It is found in the United States and Mexico.
