= Trupanea kukunoria =

Scientific classification
- Kingdom: Animalia
- Phylum: Arthropoda
- Clade: Pancrustacea
- Class: Insecta
- Order: Diptera
- Family: Tephritidae
- Subfamily: Tephritinae
- Tribe: Tephritini
- Genus: Trupanea
- Species: T. kukunoria

Binomial name
- Trupanea kukunoria Hendel, 1927

Synonyms
- Tephritis kukunoria Hendel, 1927

Species of fly

Trupanea kukunoria is a species of tephritid or fruit flies in the genus Tephritis of the family Tephritidae.

== Distribution ==
Mongolia, China.
