= Tephritis azari =

Scientific classification
- Kingdom: Animalia
- Phylum: Arthropoda
- Class: Insecta
- Order: Diptera
- Family: Tephritidae
- Subfamily: Tephritinae
- Tribe: Tephritini
- Genus: Tephritis
- Species: T. azari

Binomial name
- Tephritis azari Namin & Korneyev, 2012

Species of fly

Tephritis azari is a species of tephritic or fruit flies in the genus Tephritis of the family Tephritidae.

It is found in Azerbaijan and Iran.
