= Tephritis hendeliana =

Scientific classification
- Kingdom: Animalia
- Phylum: Arthropoda
- Class: Insecta
- Order: Diptera
- Family: Tephritidae
- Subfamily: Tephritinae
- Tribe: Tephritini
- Genus: Tephritis
- Species: T. hendeliana

Binomial name
- Tephritis hendeliana Hering, 1944

Species of fly

Tephritis hendeliana is a species of tephritid or fruit flies in the genus Tephritis of the family Tephritidae.

It is found in France, Germany, central Russia south to Spain, Italy, Ukraine, the Caucasus, and Mongolia.
