= Tephritis californica =

Scientific classification
- Kingdom: Animalia
- Phylum: Arthropoda
- Class: Insecta
- Order: Diptera
- Family: Tephritidae
- Subfamily: Tephritinae
- Tribe: Tephritini
- Genus: Tephritis
- Species: T. californica

Binomial name
- Tephritis californica Doane, 1899

Species of fly

Tephritis californica is a species of tephritid or fruit flies in the genus Tephritis of the family Tephritidae found in the United States.

It is found in the United States.
