= Tephritis recurrens =

Scientific classification
- Kingdom: Animalia
- Phylum: Arthropoda
- Class: Insecta
- Order: Diptera
- Family: Tephritidae
- Subfamily: Tephritinae
- Tribe: Tephritini
- Genus: Tephritis
- Species: T. recurrens

Binomial name
- Tephritis recurrens Loew, 1869

Species of fly

Tephritis recurrens is a species of tephritid or fruit flies in the genus Tephritis of the family Tephritidae.

It is found in Europe to Kazakhstan and the Caucasus, and China.
