= Tephritis frauenfeldi =

Scientific classification
- Kingdom: Animalia
- Phylum: Arthropoda
- Class: Insecta
- Order: Diptera
- Family: Tephritidae
- Subfamily: Tephritinae
- Tribe: Tephritini
- Genus: Tephritis
- Species: T. frauenfeldi

Binomial name
- Tephritis frauenfeldi Hendel, 1927

Species of fly

Tephritis frauenfeldi is a species of tephritid or fruit flies in the genus Tephritis of the family Tephritidae.

It is found in Austria, Slovakia, Hungary, Romania, north Italy, Albania, and Turkey.
