= Tephritis sauterina =

Scientific classification
- Kingdom: Animalia
- Phylum: Arthropoda
- Class: Insecta
- Order: Diptera
- Family: Tephritidae
- Subfamily: Tephritinae
- Tribe: Tephritini
- Genus: Tephritis
- Species: T. sauterina

Binomial name
- Tephritis sauterina Merz, 1994

Synonyms
- Tephritis sauteri Merz, 1992

Species of fly

Tephritis sauterina is a species of tephritid or fruit flies in the genus Tephritis of the family Tephritidae.

It is found in Switzerland.
