= Tephritis valida =

Scientific classification
- Kingdom: Animalia
- Phylum: Arthropoda
- Class: Insecta
- Order: Diptera
- Family: Tephritidae
- Subfamily: Tephritinae
- Tribe: Tephritini
- Genus: Tephritis
- Species: T. valida

Binomial name
- Tephritis valida (Loew, 1858)

Synonyms
- Trypeta valida Loew, 1858; Tephritis procera Loew, 1869

Species of fly

Tephritis valida is a species of tephritid or fruit flies in the genus Tephritis of the family Tephritidae.

It is found in Hungary to Turkey and the Caucasus.
