= Tephritis pulchra =

Scientific classification
- Kingdom: Animalia
- Phylum: Arthropoda
- Class: Insecta
- Order: Diptera
- Family: Tephritidae
- Subfamily: Tephritinae
- Tribe: Tephritini
- Genus: Tephritis
- Species: T. pulchra

Binomial name
- Tephritis pulchra (Loew, 1844)

Synonyms
- Trypeta pulchra Loew, 1844

Species of fly

Tephritis pulchra is a species of tephritid or fruit flies in the genus Tephritis of the family Tephritidae.

It is found in central and south Europe, to Turkey and North Africa.
