= Tephritis simplex =

Scientific classification
- Kingdom: Animalia
- Phylum: Arthropoda
- Class: Insecta
- Order: Diptera
- Family: Tephritidae
- Subfamily: Tephritinae
- Tribe: Tephritini
- Genus: Tephritis
- Species: T. simplex

Binomial name
- Tephritis simplex (Loew, 1844)

Synonyms
- Trypeta simplex Loew, 1844

Species of fly

Tephritis simplex is a species of tephritid or fruit flies in the genus Tephritis of the family Tephritidae.

It is found in Europe, Algeria, Tunisia, Crete, Turkey, and Israel.
