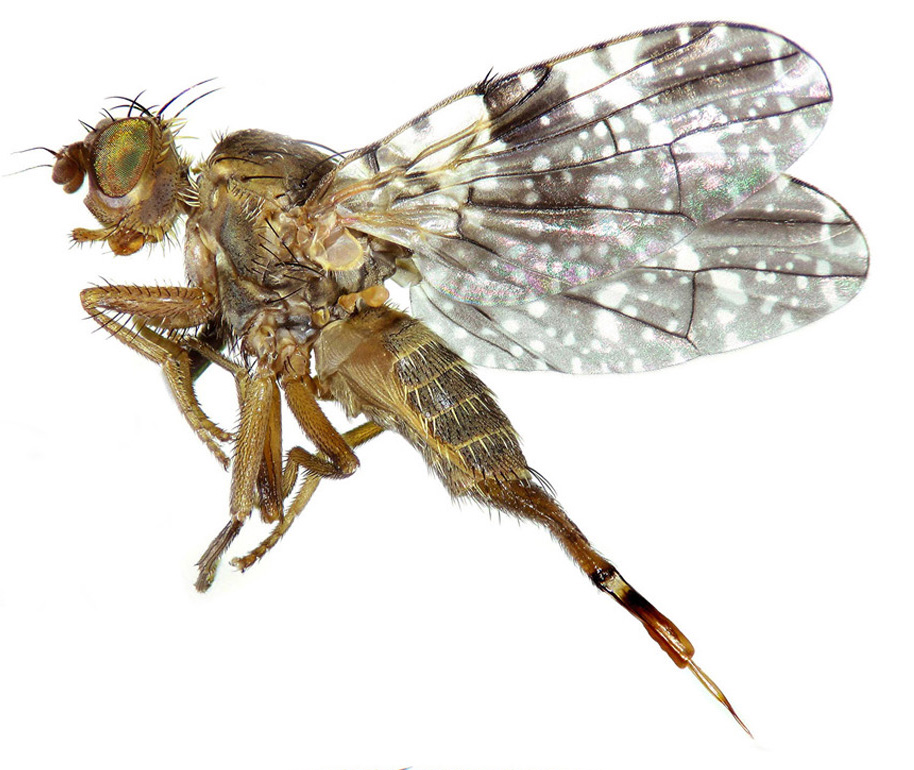
- Tephritis arnicae female

Scientific classification
- Kingdom: Animalia
- Phylum: Arthropoda
- Class: Insecta
- Order: Diptera
- Family: Tephritidae
- Subfamily: Tephritinae
- Tribe: Tephritini
- Genus: Tephritis
- Species: T. arnicae

Binomial name
- Tephritis arnicae (Linnaeus, 1758)

Synonyms
- Musca arnicae Linnaeus, 1758; Trypeta flavicauda Meigen, 1826; Trypeta arnicivora Loew, 1844; Trypeta eggeri Frauenfeld, 1857; Tephritis melanotrichota Hendel, 1903; Tephritis malanotrichota Becker, 1905

= Tephritis arnicae =

Species of fly

Tephritis arnicae is a species of picture-winged fly of the family Tephritidae, which are variously known as fruit-flies (North America) or gall flies (Britain and Ireland).

The larvae feed in the flowerheads of species of Arnica montana, Doronicum grandiflorum, D. austriacum and D. hungaricum.

It is found in the United Kingdom, Scandinavia, south to France, Bulgaria, and Ukraine.
