= Tephritis fallax =

Scientific classification
- Kingdom: Animalia
- Phylum: Arthropoda
- Class: Insecta
- Order: Diptera
- Family: Tephritidae
- Genus: Tephritis
- Species: T. fallax

Binomial name
- Tephritis fallax (Loew, 1844)

Species of fly

Tephritis fallax is a species of tephritid or fruit flies in the genus Tephritis of the family Tephritidae.
