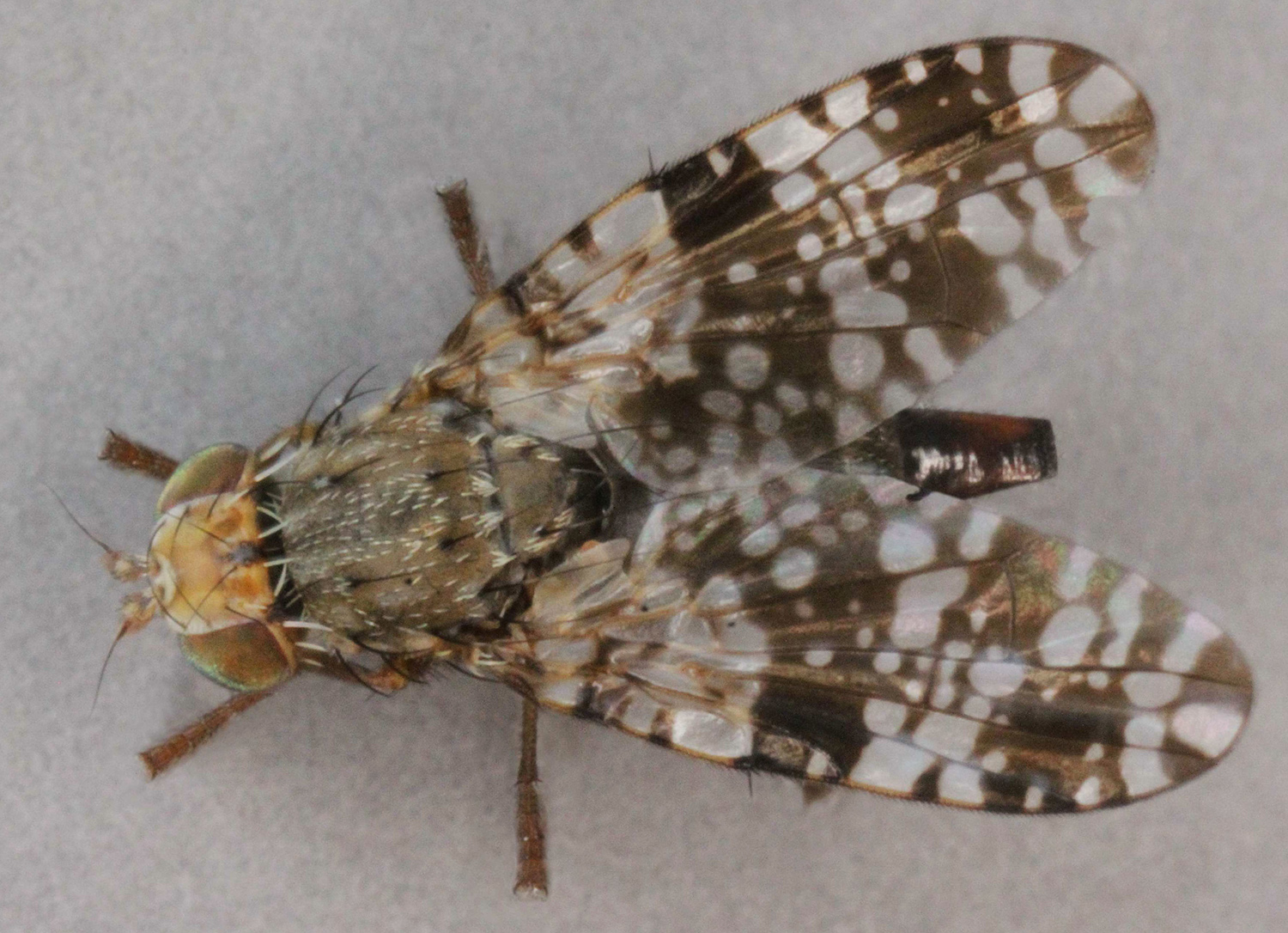

Scientific classification
- Kingdom: Animalia
- Phylum: Arthropoda
- Class: Insecta
- Order: Diptera
- Family: Tephritidae
- Subfamily: Tephritinae
- Tribe: Tephritini
- Genus: Tephritis
- Species: T. ruralis

Binomial name
- Tephritis ruralis (Loew, 1844)

Synonyms
- Trypeta ruralis Loew, 1844

= Tephritis ruralis =

Species of fly

Tephritis ruralis is a species of tephritid or fruit flies in the genus Tephritis of the family Tephritidae.

It is found in Europe.
