= Tephritis conflata =

Scientific classification
- Kingdom: Animalia
- Phylum: Arthropoda
- Clade: Pancrustacea
- Class: Insecta
- Order: Diptera
- Family: Tephritidae
- Genus: Tephritis
- Species: T. conflata

Binomial name
- Tephritis conflata Dirlbek & Dirlbek, 1995

Species of fly

Tephritis conflata is a species of tephritid or fruit flies in the genus Tephritis of the family Tephritidae.

It is found in Kyrgyzstan.
