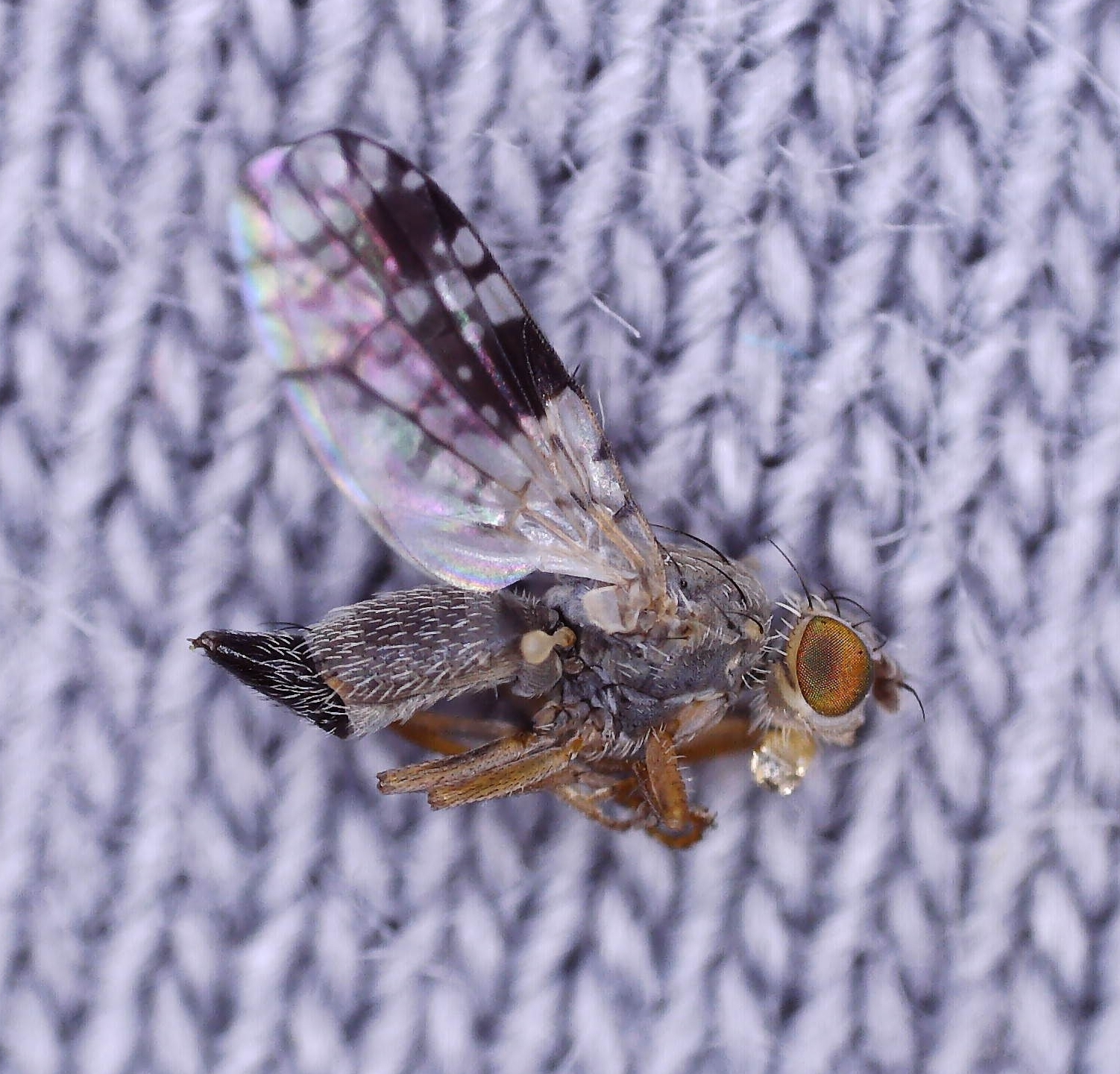

Scientific classification
- Kingdom: Animalia
- Phylum: Arthropoda
- Class: Insecta
- Order: Diptera
- Family: Tephritidae
- Genus: Tephritis
- Species: T. rydeni

Binomial name
- Tephritis rydeni Hering, 1956

= Tephritis rydeni =

Species of fly

Tephritis rydeni is a species of tephritid fruit fly in the family Tephritidae.

It is found in Sweden and northern and central Russia.
