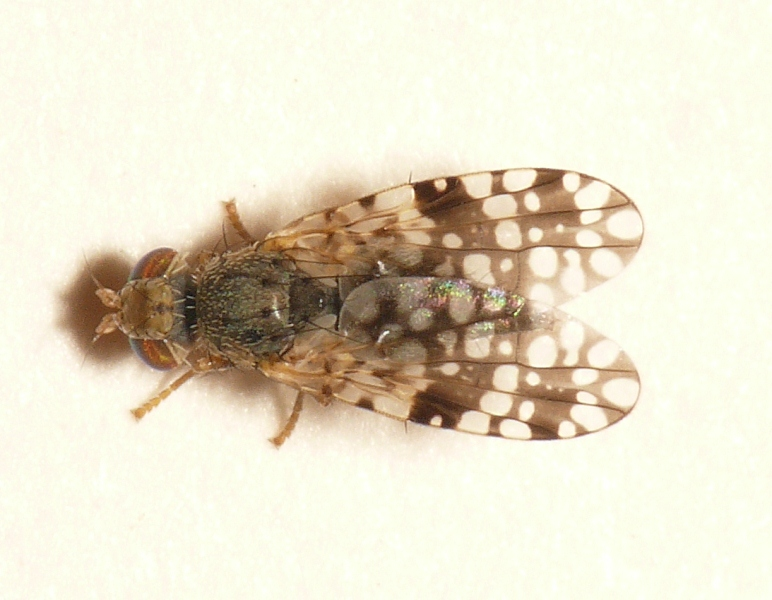
- Tephritis praecox

Scientific classification
- Kingdom: Animalia
- Phylum: Arthropoda
- Class: Insecta
- Order: Diptera
- Family: Tephritidae
- Subfamily: Tephritinae
- Tribe: Tephritini
- Genus: Tephritis
- Species: T. praecox

Binomial name
- Tephritis praecox (Loew, 1844)

Synonyms
- Trypeta praecox Loew, 1844; Tephritis poecilura Loew, 1869

= Tephritis praecox =

Species of fly

Tephritis praecox is a species is a species of fly in the family Tephritidae found across Europe.

== Description ==
The adult fly is grey-brown in colour with a wing length measuring between 1.8–3.2 mm. The wings are hyaline and distinctively marked between different species of this genus.

== Biology ==
T. praecox is associated with several host plants including Calendula arvensis, Chrysanthemum sp., Filago gallica, and Senecio. When mating, male flies wait near the capitulum of their chosen flower bud. When a female appears they begin a mating dance during which the male holds his wings flat and then opens them alternately. The larvae develops in the seed head.

== Distribution ==
T. praecox can be found across central and western Europe. It was first noted from Britain in 1937 on the basis of a single female found in Suffolk in 1907.
