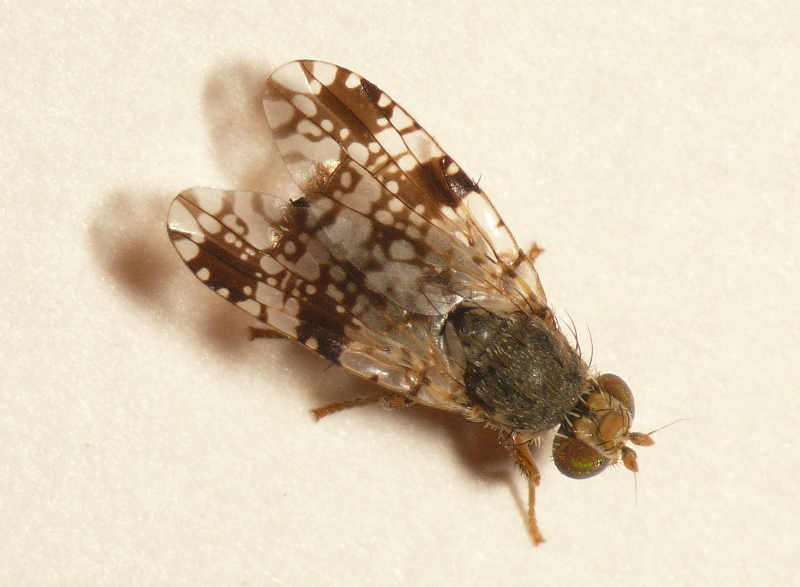

Scientific classification
- Kingdom: Animalia
- Phylum: Arthropoda
- Class: Insecta
- Order: Diptera
- Family: Tephritidae
- Subfamily: Tephritinae
- Tribe: Tephritini
- Genus: Tephritis
- Species: T. crepidis

Binomial name
- Tephritis crepidis Hendel, 1927

= Tephritis crepidis =

Species of fly

Tephritis crepidis is a species of tephritid or fruit flies in the genus Tephritis of the family Tephritidae.

It is found in the Netherlands, Central Europe, Ukraine, south to Spain, north Italy, Bulgaria, and the Caucasus.
