= Tephritis nigricauda =

Scientific classification
- Kingdom: Animalia
- Phylum: Arthropoda
- Class: Insecta
- Order: Diptera
- Family: Tephritidae
- Subfamily: Tephritinae
- Tribe: Tephritini
- Genus: Tephritis
- Species: T. nigricauda

Binomial name
- Tephritis nigricauda (Loew, 1856)

Synonyms
- Trypeta nigricauda Loew, 1856; Tephritis matutina Rondani, 1871

Species of fly

Tephritis nigricauda is a species of tephritid or fruit flies in the genus Tephritis of the family Tephritidae.

It is found in Europe.
