= Tephritis oligostictica =

Scientific classification
- Kingdom: Animalia
- Phylum: Arthropoda
- Class: Insecta
- Order: Diptera
- Family: Tephritidae
- Subfamily: Tephritinae
- Tribe: Tephritini
- Genus: Tephritis
- Species: T. oligostictica

Binomial name
- Tephritis oligostictica Dirlbek & Dirlbek, 1971

Species of fly

Tephritis oligostictica is a species of tephritid or fruit flies in the genus Tephritis of the family Tephritidae.

It is found in Syria and Afghanistan.
