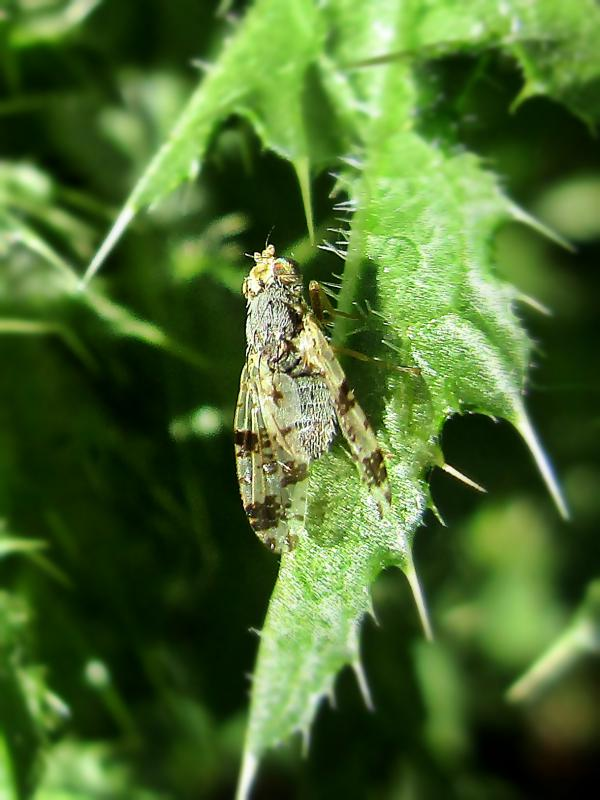
- Tephritis hyoscyami Netherlands

Scientific classification
- Kingdom: Animalia
- Phylum: Arthropoda
- Class: Insecta
- Order: Diptera
- Family: Tephritidae
- Subfamily: Tephritinae
- Tribe: Tephritini
- Genus: Tephritis
- Species: T. hyoscyami

Binomial name
- Tephritis hyoscyami (Linnaeus, 1758)

Synonyms
- Musca hyoscyami Linnaeus, 1758; Musca cinerea Linnaeus, 1764; Tephritis personatae Loew, 1869; Tephritis hyosciami Rondani, 1871; Musca leontodontis De Geer, 1776

= Tephritis hyoscyami =

Species of fly

Tephritis hyoscyami is a species of fly in the family Tephritidae, the gall flies. It is found in the Palearctic. The larvae feed on Carduus crispus, Carduus nutans, and Cirsium species.

It is found in the United Kingdom, Scandinavia south to France, Romania and the Caucasus, east Russia, and China.
