= Tephritis postica =

Scientific classification
- Kingdom: Animalia
- Phylum: Arthropoda
- Class: Insecta
- Order: Diptera
- Family: Tephritidae
- Subfamily: Tephritinae
- Tribe: Tephritini
- Genus: Tephritis
- Species: T. postica

Binomial name
- Tephritis postica Loew, 1844

Synonyms
- Musca heraclei Fabricius, 1794

Species of fly

Tephritis postica is a species of tephritid or fruit flies in the genus Tephritis of the family Tephritidae.

It is found in France, Central Europe, Ukraine South to North Africa, Israel, and Iran.
