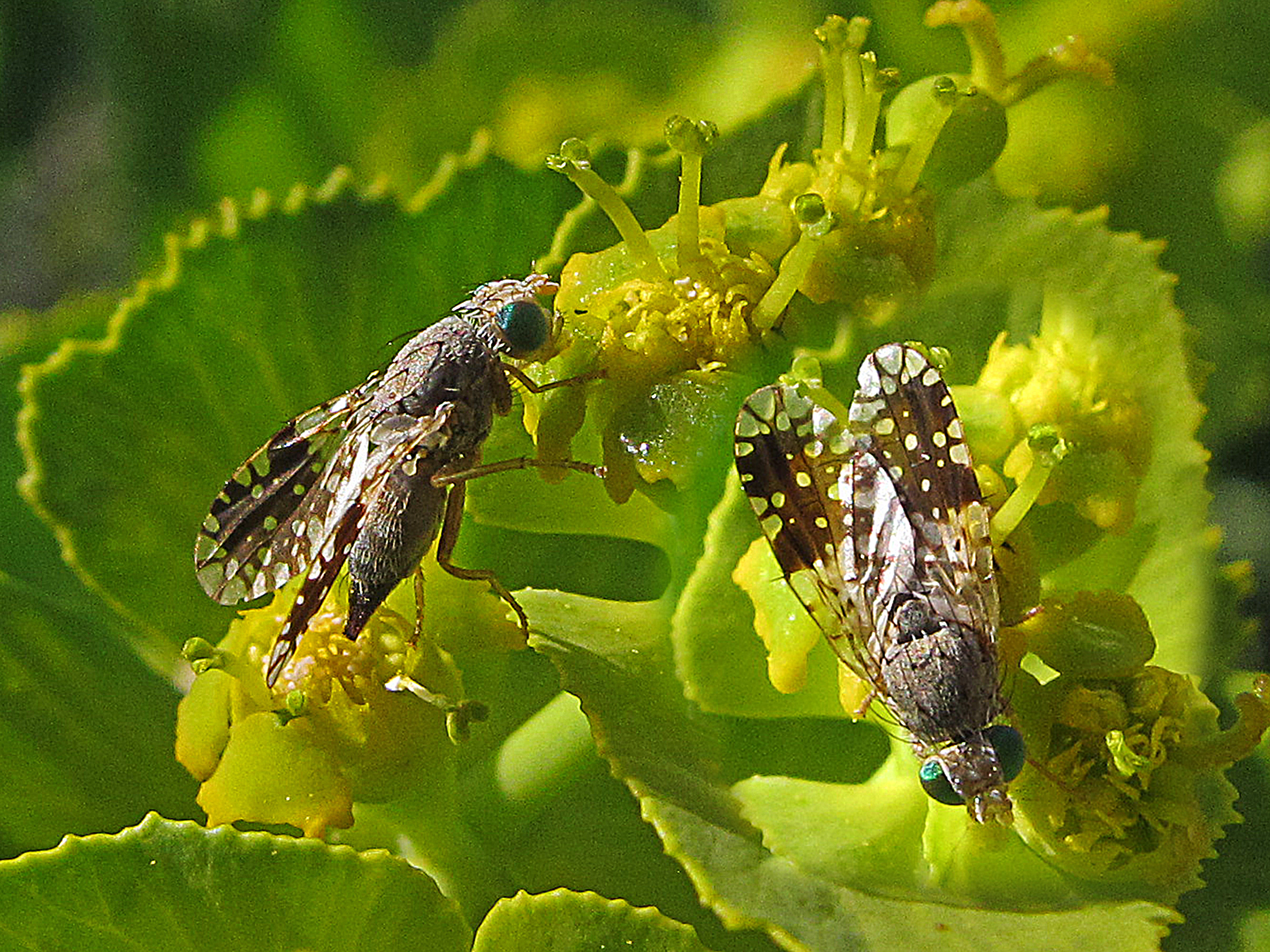
- Fruit Flies

Scientific classification
- Kingdom: Animalia
- Phylum: Arthropoda
- Class: Insecta
- Order: Diptera
- Family: Tephritidae
- Subfamily: Tephritinae
- Tribe: Tephritini
- Genus: Tephritis
- Species: T. carmen

Binomial name
- Tephritis carmen Hering, 1937

= Tephritis carmen =

Species of fly

Tephritis carmen is a species of tephritid or fruit flies in the genus Tephritis of the family Tephritidae.

It is found in Belgium, Austria, Ukraine south to Spain, Italy, and Bulgaria.
