= Tephritis heiseri =

Scientific classification
- Kingdom: Animalia
- Phylum: Arthropoda
- Class: Insecta
- Order: Diptera
- Family: Tephritidae
- Subfamily: Tephritinae
- Tribe: Tephritini
- Genus: Tephritis
- Species: T. heiseri

Binomial name
- Tephritis heiseri Frauenfeld, 1865

Species of fly

Tephritis heiseri is a species of tephritid or fruit flies in the genus Tephritis of the family Tephritidae.

It is found in Central Europe, West Siberia to the Caucasus, Kazakhstan, and Mongolia.
