= Tephritis okera =

Scientific classification
- Kingdom: Animalia
- Phylum: Arthropoda
- Class: Insecta
- Order: Diptera
- Family: Tephritidae
- Subfamily: Tephritinae
- Tribe: Tephritini
- Genus: Tephritis
- Species: T. okera

Binomial name
- Tephritis okera (Shinji, 1940)

Synonyms
- Platensia okera Shinji, 1940

Species of fly

Tephritis okera is a species of tephritid or fruit flies in the genus Tephritis of the family Tephritidae.

It is found in Russia, China, and Japan.
