= Tephritis palmeri =

Scientific classification
- Kingdom: Animalia
- Phylum: Arthropoda
- Clade: Pancrustacea
- Class: Insecta
- Order: Diptera
- Family: Tephritidae
- Subfamily: Tephritinae
- Tribe: Tephritini
- Genus: Tephritis
- Species: T. palmeri

Binomial name
- Tephritis palmeri Jenkins, 1989

Species of fly

Tephritis palmeri is a species of tephritid or fruit flies in the genus Tephritis of the family Tephritidae.

It is found in the United States and Mexico.
