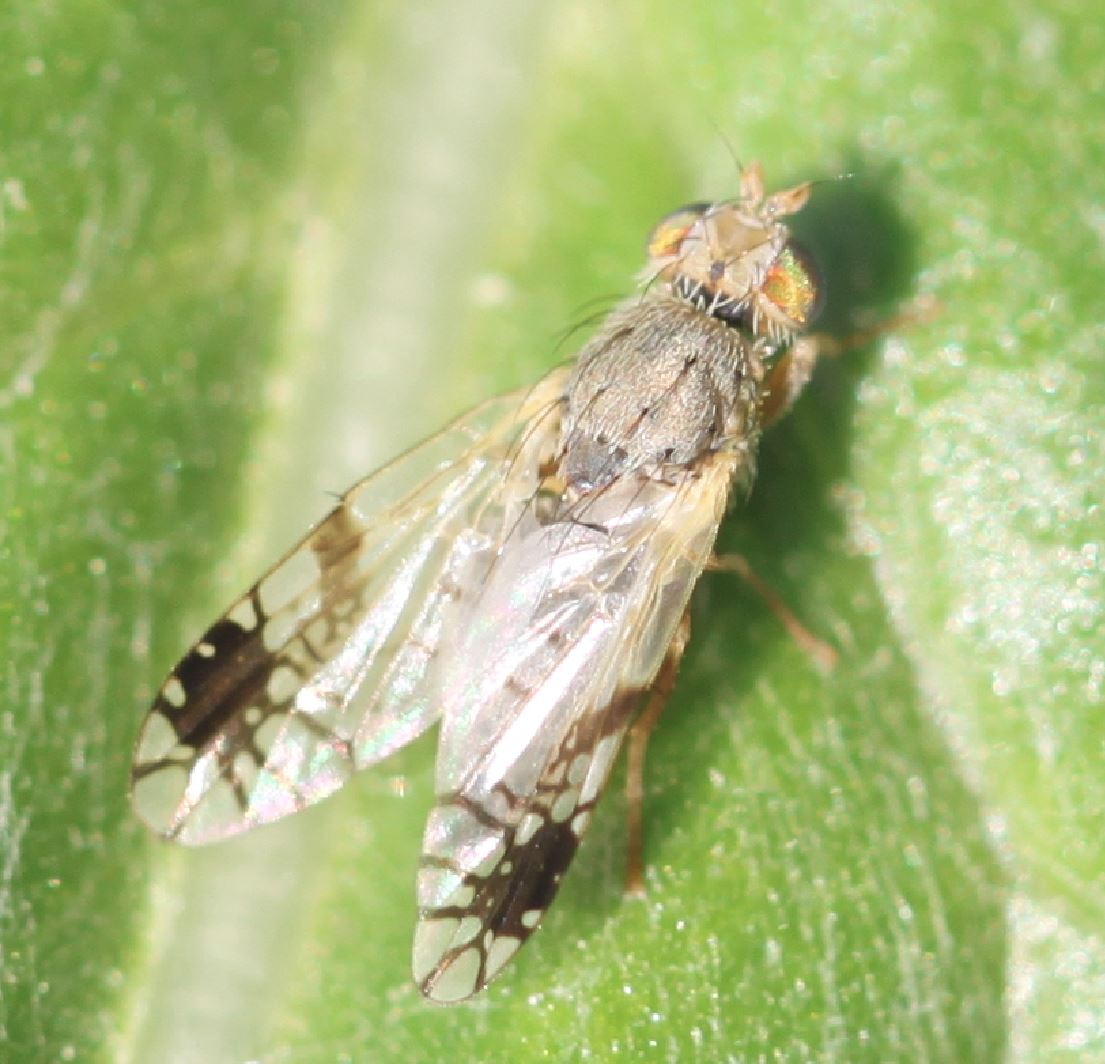

Scientific classification
- Kingdom: Animalia
- Phylum: Arthropoda
- Class: Insecta
- Order: Diptera
- Family: Tephritidae
- Subfamily: Tephritinae
- Tribe: Tephritini
- Genus: Tephritis
- Species: T. cometa

Binomial name
- Tephritis cometa (Loew, 1840)

Synonyms
- Trypeta cometa Loew, 1840

= Tephritis cometa =

Species of fly

Tephritis cometa is a species of tephritid or fruit flies in the genus Tephritis of the family Tephritidae.

It is found in the United Kingdom, Scandinavia, west Siberia, south to France, and the Middle East.
