= Tephritis conyzifoliae =

Scientific classification
- Kingdom: Animalia
- Phylum: Arthropoda
- Class: Insecta
- Order: Diptera
- Family: Tephritidae
- Subfamily: Tephritinae
- Tribe: Tephritini
- Genus: Tephritis
- Species: T. conyzifoliae

Binomial name
- Tephritis conyzifoliae Merz, 1992

Synonyms
- Tephritis nartshukovi Basov & Tolstoguzova, 1994; Tephritis epicrepis Shcherbakov, 2001

Species of fly

Tephritis conyzifoliae is a species of tephritid or fruit flies in the genus Tephritis of the family Tephritidae.

It is found in Switzerland.
