= Tephritis pura =

Scientific classification
- Kingdom: Animalia
- Phylum: Arthropoda
- Class: Insecta
- Order: Diptera
- Family: Tephritidae
- Subfamily: Tephritinae
- Tribe: Tephritini
- Genus: Tephritis
- Species: T. pura

Binomial name
- Tephritis pura (Loew, 1873)

Synonyms
- Trypeta pura Loew, 1873; Trypeta tribulis Harris, 1835; Trypeta tribulus Foote, 1993

Species of fly

Tephritis pura is a species of tephritid or fruit flies in the genus Tephritis of the family Tephritidae.

It is found in Canada and the United States.
