= Tephritis spreta =

Scientific classification
- Kingdom: Animalia
- Phylum: Arthropoda
- Class: Insecta
- Order: Diptera
- Family: Tephritidae
- Subfamily: Tephritinae
- Tribe: Tephritini
- Genus: Tephritis
- Species: T. spreta

Binomial name
- Tephritis spreta (Loew, 1861)

Synonyms
- Trypeta spreta Loew, 1861

Species of fly

Tephritis spreta is a species of tephritid or fruit flies in the genus Tephritis of the family Tephritidae.

It is found in Egypt.
