= Tephritis bipartita =

Scientific classification
- Kingdom: Animalia
- Phylum: Arthropoda
- Class: Insecta
- Order: Diptera
- Family: Tephritidae
- Subfamily: Tephritinae
- Tribe: Tephritini
- Genus: Tephritis
- Species: T. bipartita

Binomial name
- Tephritis bipartita Hendel, 1938

Synonyms
- Tephritis biparitita Norrbom, Carroll, Thompson, White & Freidberg, 1999

Species of fly

Tephritis bipartita is a species of tephritid or fruit flies in the genus Tephritis of the family Tephritidae.

It is found in China.
