= Tephritis posis =

Scientific classification
- Kingdom: Animalia
- Phylum: Arthropoda
- Class: Insecta
- Order: Diptera
- Family: Tephritidae
- Subfamily: Tephritinae
- Tribe: Tephritini
- Genus: Tephritis
- Species: T. posis

Binomial name
- Tephritis posis Hering, 1939

Species of fly

Tephritis posis is a species of tephritid or fruit flies in the genus Tephritis of the family Tephritidae.

It is found in Europe, Ukraine, and southwest Russia.
