= Tephritis stictica =

Scientific classification
- Kingdom: Animalia
- Phylum: Arthropoda
- Class: Insecta
- Order: Diptera
- Family: Tephritidae
- Subfamily: Tephritinae
- Tribe: Tephritini
- Genus: Tephritis
- Species: T. stictica

Binomial name
- Tephritis stictica Loew, 1862

Synonyms
- Tephritis diotitis Hendel, 1927; Tephritis diotidis Rondani, 1871

Species of fly

Tephritis stictica is a species of tephritid or fruit flies in the genus Tephritis of the family Tephritidae.

It is found in southern Europe.
