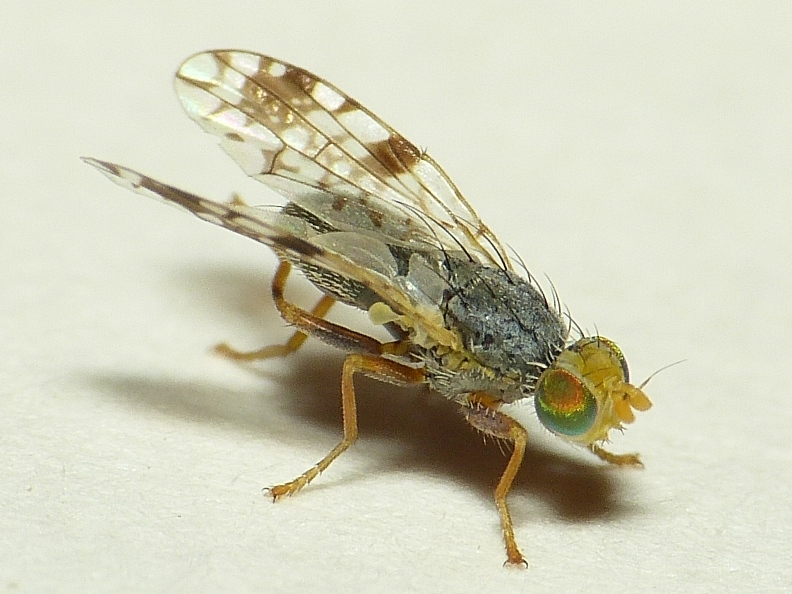

Scientific classification
- Kingdom: Animalia
- Phylum: Arthropoda
- Clade: Pancrustacea
- Class: Insecta
- Order: Diptera
- Family: Tephritidae
- Subfamily: Tephritinae
- Tribe: Tephritini
- Genus: Tephritis
- Species: T. angustipennis

Binomial name
- Tephritis angustipennis (Loew, 1844)

Synonyms
- Trypeta angustipennis Loew, 1844; Tephritis ptarmicae Hering, 1935; Trypeta segregata Frauenfeld, 1864

= Tephritis angustipennis =

Species of fly

Tephritis angustipennis is a species of tephritid or fruit flies in the genus Tephritis of the family Tephritidae.

It is found in Scandinavia, south to Belgium, Switzerland and Bulgaria, east to Kazakhstan, the United States, and Canada.
