= Tephritis michiganensis =

Scientific classification
- Kingdom: Animalia
- Phylum: Arthropoda
- Class: Insecta
- Order: Diptera
- Family: Tephritidae
- Subfamily: Tephritinae
- Tribe: Tephritini
- Genus: Tephritis
- Species: T. michiganensis

Binomial name
- Tephritis michiganensis Quisenberry, 1951

Species of fly

Tephritis michiganensis is a species of fruit fly in the family Tephritidae.

It is found in Canada and the United States.
