= Tephritis truncata =

Scientific classification
- Kingdom: Animalia
- Phylum: Arthropoda
- Class: Insecta
- Order: Diptera
- Family: Tephritidae
- Subfamily: Tephritinae
- Tribe: Tephritini
- Genus: Tephritis
- Species: T. truncata

Binomial name
- Tephritis truncata (Loew, 1844)

Synonyms
- Trypeta truncata Loew, 1844

Species of fly

Tephritis truncata is a species of tephritid or fruit flies in the genus Tephritis of the family Tephritidae.

It is found from central and southern Europe to South Russia, the Caucasus, and Tunisia.
