= Tephritis tridentata =

Scientific classification
- Kingdom: Animalia
- Phylum: Arthropoda
- Class: Insecta
- Order: Diptera
- Family: Tephritidae
- Subfamily: Tephritinae
- Tribe: Tephritini
- Genus: Tephritis
- Species: T. tridentata

Binomial name
- Tephritis tridentata Korneyev & Namin, 2013

Species of fly

Tephritis tridentata is a species of tephritid or fruit flies in the genus Tephritis of the family Tephritidae.

It is found in Turkmenistan, Kazakhstan, and Iran.
