= Tephritis cincta =

Scientific classification
- Kingdom: Animalia
- Phylum: Arthropoda
- Class: Insecta
- Order: Diptera
- Family: Tephritidae
- Subfamily: Tephritinae
- Tribe: Tephritini
- Genus: Tephritis
- Species: T. cincta

Binomial name
- Tephritis cincta (Loew, 1844)

Synonyms
- Trypeta cincta Loew, 1844

Species of fly

Tephritis cincta is a species of tephritid or fruit flies in the genus Campiglossa of the family Tephritidae.

It is found in Denmark and Germany.
