= Tephritis hurvitzi =

Scientific classification
- Kingdom: Animalia
- Phylum: Arthropoda
- Class: Insecta
- Order: Diptera
- Family: Tephritidae
- Subfamily: Tephritinae
- Tribe: Tephritini
- Genus: Tephritis
- Species: T. hurvitzi

Binomial name
- Tephritis hurvitzi Freidberg, 1981

Species of fly

Tephritis hurvitzi is a species of tephritid or fruit flies in the genus Tephritis of the family Tephritidae.

It is found in Greece, Turkey, Cyprus, Israel, Iran, and Uzbekistan.
