= Tephritis matricariae =

Scientific classification
- Kingdom: Animalia
- Phylum: Arthropoda
- Clade: Pancrustacea
- Class: Insecta
- Order: Diptera
- Family: Tephritidae
- Subfamily: Tephritinae
- Tribe: Tephritini
- Genus: Tephritis
- Species: T. matricariae

Binomial name
- Tephritis matricariae (Loew, 1844)

Synonyms
- Trypeta matricariae Loew, 1844

Species of fly

Tephritis matricariae (female)

Tephritis matricariae is a species of tephritid or fruit flies in the genus Tephritis of the family Tephritidae.

It is found in the Netherlands, Austria, the Balkans south to the Mediterranean, Turkey, and Egypt.
