= Tephritis arizonaensis =

Scientific classification
- Kingdom: Animalia
- Phylum: Arthropoda
- Class: Insecta
- Order: Diptera
- Family: Tephritidae
- Subfamily: Tephritinae
- Tribe: Tephritini
- Genus: Tephritis
- Species: T. arizonaensis

Binomial name
- Tephritis arizonaensis Quisenberry, 1951

Synonyms
- Tephritis arizonensis Foote, 1960

Species of fly

Tephritis arizonaensis is a species of fruit fly in the family Tephritidae.

It is found in the United States and Mexico.
