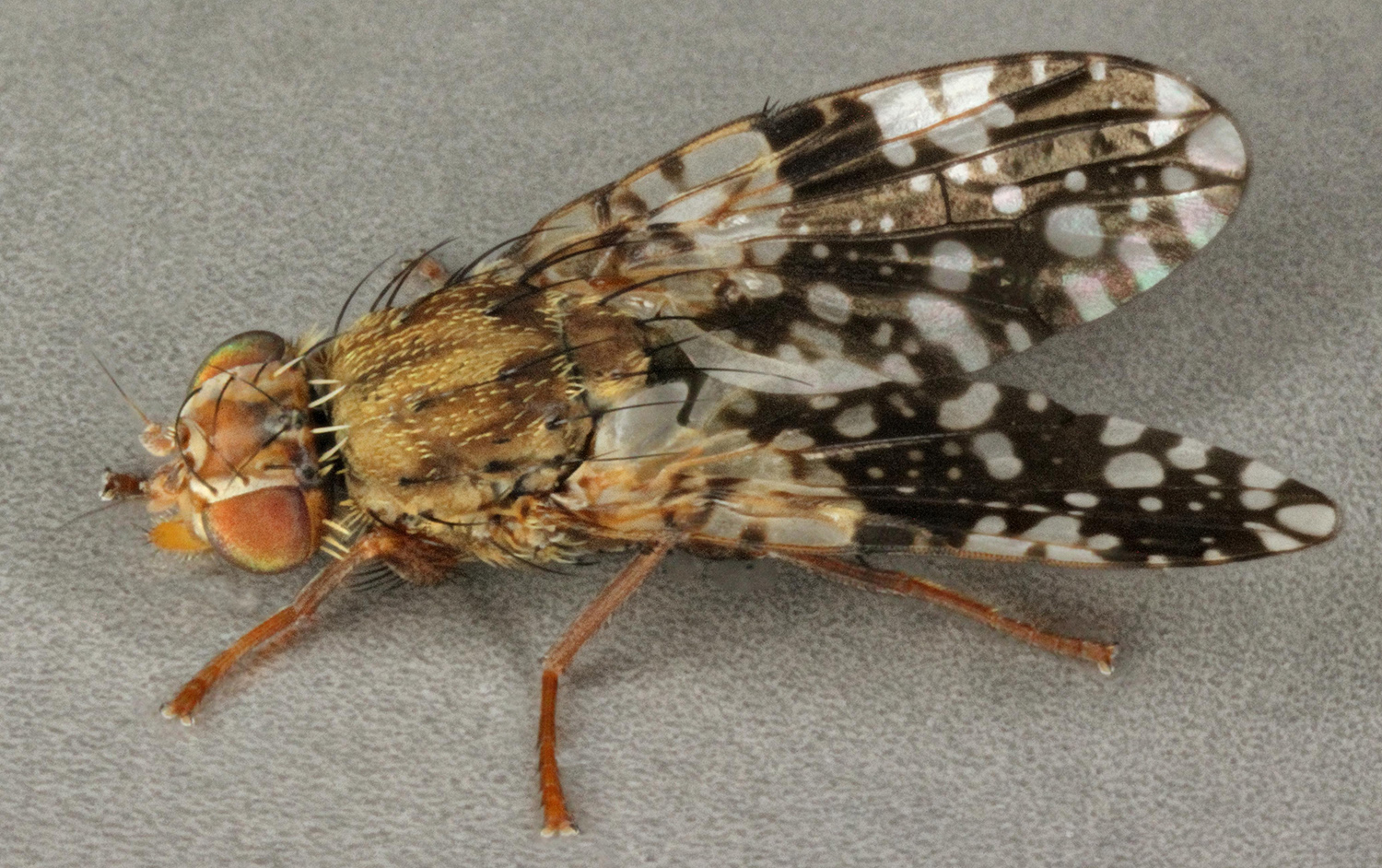
- Tephritis conura North Wales

Scientific classification
- Kingdom: Animalia
- Phylum: Arthropoda
- Clade: Pancrustacea
- Class: Insecta
- Order: Diptera
- Family: Tephritidae
- Subfamily: Tephritinae
- Tribe: Tephritini
- Genus: Tephritis
- Species: T. conura

Binomial name
- Tephritis conura (Loew, 1844)

Synonyms
- Trypeta conura (Loew, 1844)

= Tephritis conura =

Species of fly

Tephritis conura is a species of fly in the family Tephritidae, the gall flies. It is found in the Palearctic. The larvae feed on Cirsium heterophyllum and Cirsium oleraceum.

The species has been studied due to the presence of host races specializing on feeding on either of the thistle species C. heterophyllum or C. oleraceum. This is a possible example of an early stage of ecological speciation.

It is found in United Kingdom, Scandinavia, south and east to Italy, Bulgaria, and the Caucasus.
