= Tephritis rufipennis =

Scientific classification
- Kingdom: Animalia
- Phylum: Arthropoda
- Class: Insecta
- Order: Diptera
- Family: Tephritidae
- Subfamily: Tephritinae
- Tribe: Tephritini
- Genus: Tephritis
- Species: T. rufipennis

Binomial name
- Tephritis rufipennis Doane, 1899

Species of fly

Tephritis rufipennis is an American species of tephritid or fruit flies in the genus Tephritis of the family Tephritidae. This species has a unique wing pattern that is easily distinguishable from other North American Tephritis species, due to its dark edges. While its pattern may look similar to that of Oxyna, the Oxyna species only have one pair of lower front-orbital bristles.
