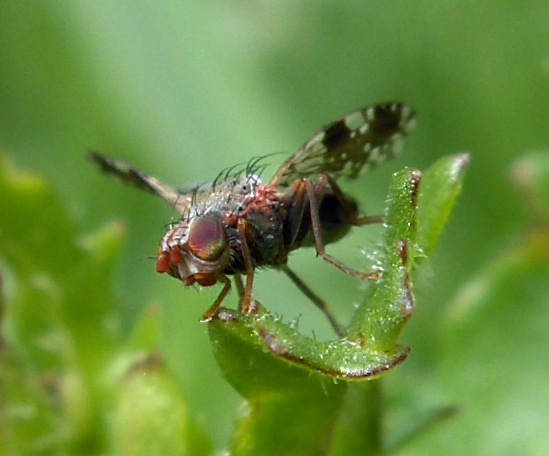

Scientific classification
- Kingdom: Animalia
- Phylum: Arthropoda
- Class: Insecta
- Order: Diptera
- Family: Tephritidae
- Subfamily: Tephritinae
- Tribe: Tephritini
- Genus: Tephritis
- Species: T. neesii

Binomial name
- Tephritis neesii (Meigen, 1830)
- Range of Tephritis neesii in Europe

Synonyms
- Trypeta conjuncta (Loew, 1844); Trypeta nusii Loew, 1844; Trypeta neesii Meigen, 1830

= Tephritis neesii =

Species of fly

Copula and oviposition on Leucanthemum vulgare

Tephritis neesii is a species of fly found across Europe. It mostly lives on Leucanthemum vulgare.

== Description ==
The adult Tephritis neesii has a blackish-brown body, with a paler powder on the surface, which is less pronounced on the abdomen. The body bears short black hairs, the tips of which appear yellow in reflected light. The legs are rufous, as is the head; the face is white, and the frons is greyish in the centre. Males have dark femurs and the third segment of each antenna is dark brown, whereas females have yellow femurs, and a vaguely brown third segment to the antenna.

== Life cycle ==
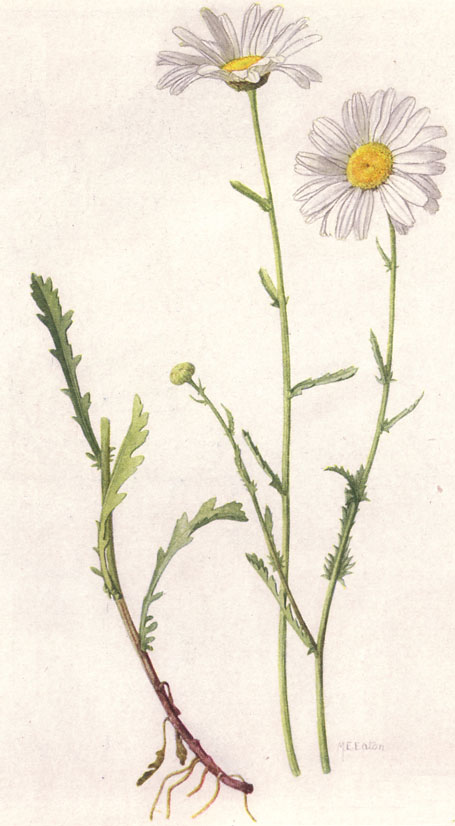
Leucanthemum vulgare is the main host plant for Tephritis neesi.

There is a single generation per year (univoltine). Eggs of T. neesii are shiny, white, and approximately 0.7 millimetres (0.028 in) long and a little over 0.2 mm (0.008 in) wide at the widest point. The second-instar larva is about 1.5 mm (0.059 in) long, and yellowish-white, with rows of pyramidal warts on each segment. The third instar is 3.5 mm (0.138 in) by 1.5 mm (0.059 in). The larvae pupate within a plant's capitulum (flower head), and the animals overwinter as adults.

== Ecology ==
Tephritis neesii lives on plants in the family Asteraceae, particularly Leucanthemum vulgare. The larvae of Tephritis larvae cut large mines in the receptacles, and cause the flowers in parts of the inflorescences to stop developing. Adults feed on seeds produced by the plant, before they have dispersed. It is the only tephritid to feed on the flower heads of L. vulgare, according to I. M. White.

Several parasitoid wasps attack T. neesii, including Bracon obscurator, Pteromalus leucanthemi, Pteromalus musaeus, Eurytoma robusta and Eurytoma strigifrons.

== Global distribution ==
Tephritis neesii is found in most countries across Europe. Distribution in Europe ranges from mainland Spain (but not Portugal) and Republic of Ireland (but not Northern Ireland) in the west, as far north as Norway, as far east as the Komi Republic in Russia (but not Western Russia), and as south as Sicily. In Great Britain, it is more frequently reported in the south and east, with few records from Scotland and Wales, and none reported for the Isle of Man.
