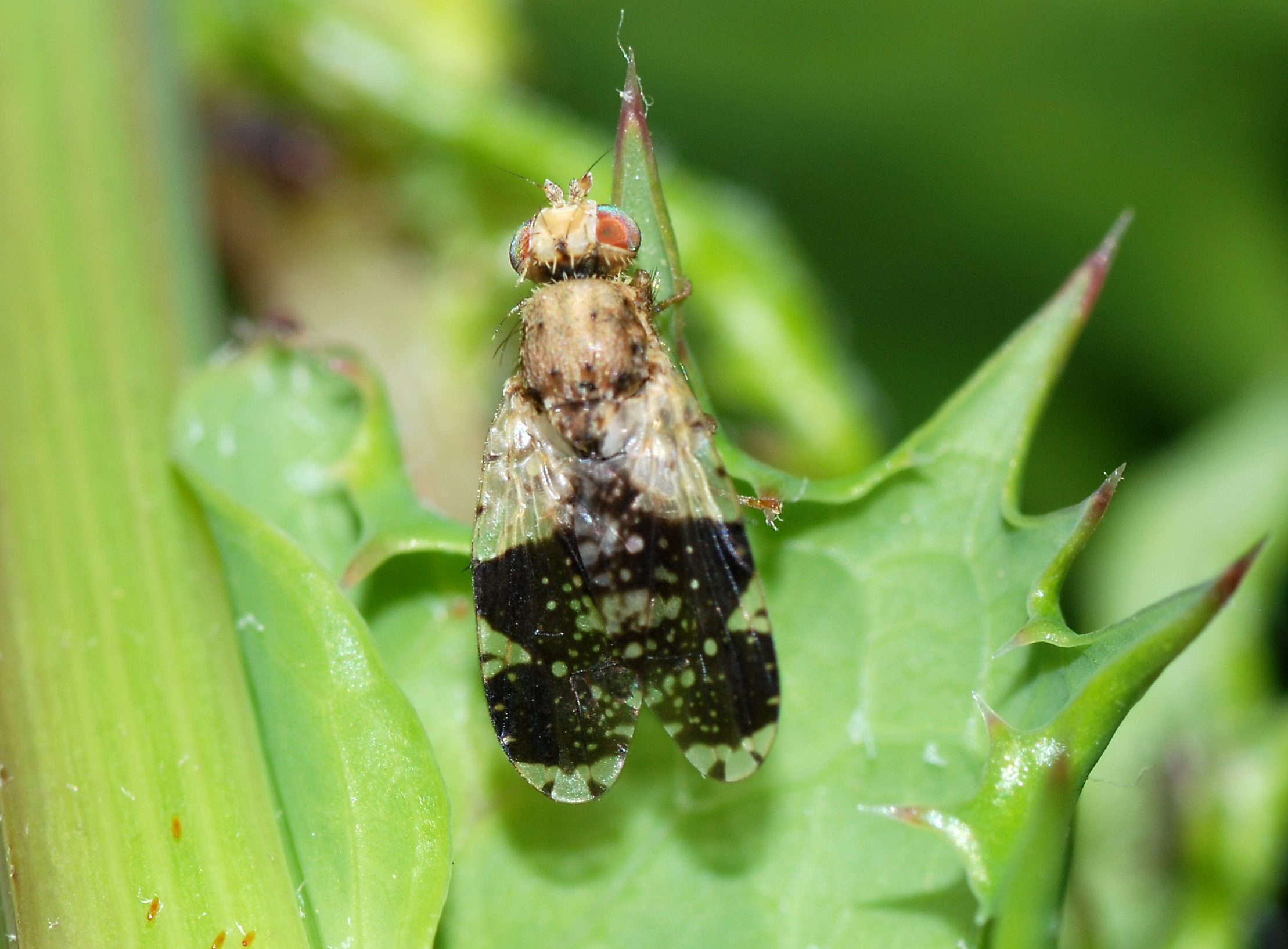
- Tephritis formosa

Scientific classification
- Kingdom: Animalia
- Phylum: Arthropoda
- Class: Insecta
- Order: Diptera
- Family: Tephritidae
- Subfamily: Tephritinae
- Tribe: Tephritini
- Genus: Tephritis; Latreille, 1804

Type species
- Musca arnicae Linnaeus, 1758

Synonyms
- Thephritis Wiedemann, 1828 (Missp.); Tephrytis Robineau-Desvoidy, 1830 (Missp.); Tephrites Gray, 1832 (Missp.); Trephritis Griffith & Pidgeon, 1832 (Missp.); Tephritus Ballou, 1926 (Missp.); Tephritoides Benjamin, 1934; Acrorellia Wang, 1990; Terbita Bassov & Tolstoguzova, 1994; Pangasella Richter, 1995

= Tephritis =

Genus of flies

Tephritis is a genus of flies. It contains around 170 described species, making it the sixth largest genus in the family Tephritidae. Many more undescribed species are known from specimen collections. Tephritis occur throughout much of the world, but most are Palearctic. They can be found in a wide range of climate types, from hot semidesert to tundra. Most species inhabit the inflorescences of plants from several tribes in the family Asteraceae, and a few species cause galls to form.

Tephritis can be distinguished from other fruit flies of the Tephritinae by the arrangement of setae on their bodies, among other characters.

== Species ==
The genus Tephritis includes the following species:

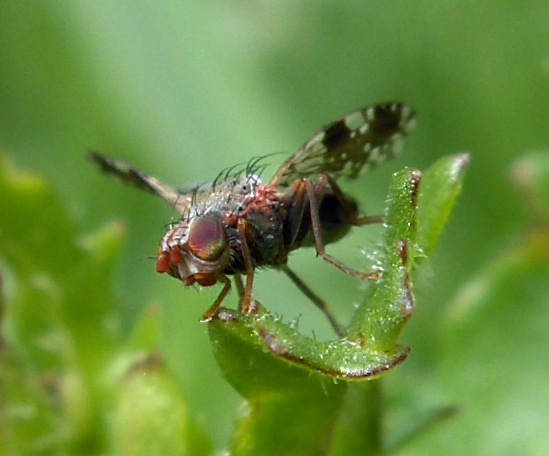
Tephritis neesii

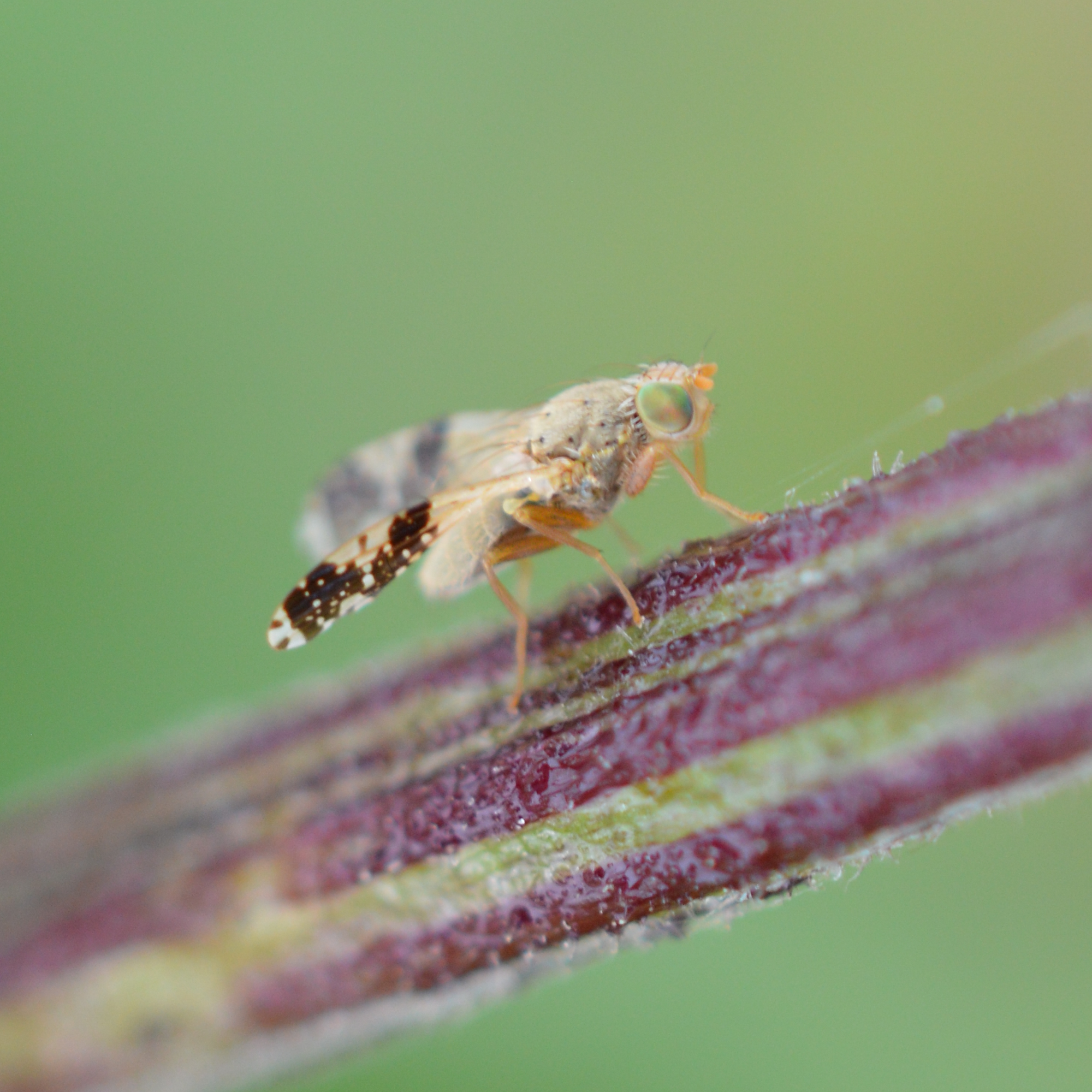
Tephritis bardanae

Tephritis conura

- T. acanthiophilopsis Hering, 1938
- T. afra (Hering, 1941)
- T. afrostriata Korneyev, 2013
- T. alamutensis Namin & Korneyev, 2017
- T. alini Hering, 1936
- T. amata Hering, 1938
- T. angulatofasciata Portschinsky, 1891
- T. angustipennis (Loew, 1844)
- T. annuliformis Wang, 1990
- T. anthrax Korneyev & Evstigneev, 2019
- T. araneosa (Coquillett, 1894)
- T. arizonaensis Quisenberry, 1951
- T. arnicae (Linnaeus, 1758)
- T. arsenii Korneyev et al., 2015
- T. atocoptera Agarwal & Kapoor, 1988
- T. azari Namin & Korneyev, 2012
- T. baccharis (Coquillett, 1894)
- T. bardanae (Schrank, 1803)
- T. bimaculata Freidberg, 1981
- T. bipartita Hendel, 1938
- T. brachyura Loew, 1869
- T. brunnea Hardy & Drew, 1996
- T. bushi Hardy & Drew, 1996
- T. californica Doane, 1899
- T. calliopsis Wang, 1990
- T. cameo Korneyev, 2013
- T. campana Korneyev & Namin 2019
- T. candidipennis Foote, 1960
- T. carcassa Dirlbek & Dirlbekova, 1974
- T. cardualis Hardy, 1974
- T. carmen Hering, 1937
- T. cassiniae Malloch, 1931
- T. cincta (Loew, 1844)
- T. cinerea Munro, 1931
- T. cirsicola Hering, 1938
- T. collina Wang, 1990
- T. cometa (Loew, 1840)
- T. conflata Dirlbek & Dirlbek, 1995
- T. consimilis Chen, 1938
- T. consuta Wang, 1990
- T. conura (Loew, 1844)
- T. conyzifoliae Merz, 1992
- T. corolla Richter, 1975
- T. crepidis Hendel, 1927
- T. crinita Hering, 1961
- T. daedala Hardy, 1964
- T. darjeelingensis Agarwal, et al., 1992
- T. dentata Wang, 1990
- T. dilacerata (Loew, 1846)
- T. dioscurea (Loew, 1856)
- T. distigmata Hardy & Drew, 1996
- T. dudichi Aczel, 1939
- T. duguma Dirlbek, 1975
- T. euarestelloides Richter, 1975
- T. fallax (Loew, 1844)
- T. fascigera Malloch, 1931
- T. femoralis Chen, 1938
- T. flaviventris Hering, 1938
- T. formosa (Loew, 1844)
- T. frauenfeldi Hendel, 1927
- T. furcata Hardy & Drew, 1996
- T. glaciatrix (Enderlein, 1934)
- T. gladius Korneyev, 2013
- T. goberti Séguy, 1932
- T. heiseri Frauenfeld, 1865
- T. heliophila Hendel, 1927
- T. hemimelaena (Bezzi, 1920)
- T. hendeliana Hering, 1944
- T. hengduana Wang, 1990
- T. hesperia Hardy & Drew, 1996
- T. hospita Richter, 1975
- T. hungarica Hering, 1937
- T. hurvitzi Freidberg, 1981
- T. hyoscyami (Linnaeus, 1758)
- T. impunctata Shiraki, 1933
- T. jabeliae Freidberg, 1981
- T. joanae Goeden, 1993
- T. jocaste Hering, 1953
- T. kogardtauica Hering, 1944
- T. koreacola Kwon, 1985
- T. kovalevi Korneyev & Kameneva, 1990
- T. kukunoria Hendel, 1927
- T. kutuki Yaran & Görmez, 2020
- T. labecula Foote, 1959
- T. leavittensis Blanc, 1979
- T. leontodontis (De Geer, 1776)
- T. ludhianaensis Agarwal & Kapoor, 1988
- T. luteipes Merz, 1992
- T. maccus Hering, 1937
- T. majuscula Hering & Ito, 1953
- T. marginata Malloch, 1931
- T. mariannae Merz, 1992
- T. matricariae (Loew, 1844)
- T. megalura Hering, 1938
- T. merzi Freidberg & Kütük, 2003
- T. mesopotamica Korneyev & J.Dirlbek, 2000
- T. michiganensis Quisenberry, 1951
- T. monapunctata Wang, 1990
- T. mongolica Hendel, 1927
- T. multiguttata (Becker, 1913)
- T. multiguttulata Hering, 1953
- T. mutabilis Merz, 1992
- T. nebulosa (Becker, 1908)
- T. neesii (Meigen, 1830)
- T. nigricauda (Loew, 1856)
- T. obscuricornis Rondani, 1871
- T. ochroptera Korneyev, 2013
- T. oedipus Hendel, 1927
- T. okera (Shinji, 1940)
- T. oligostictica Dirlbek & Dirlbek, 1971
- T. ovatipennis Foote, 1960
- T. ozaslani Kütük, Bayrak & Hayat, 2012
- T. pallescens Hering, 1961
- T. palmeri Jenkins, 1989
- T. pantosticta Hardy & Drew, 1996
- T. pelia Schiner, 1868
- T. pentagonella (Bezzi, 1928)
- T. phaeostigma Hardy & Drew, 1996
- T. plebeia Malloch, 1931
- T. poenia (Walker, 1849)
- T. posis Hering, 1939
- T. postica Loew, 1844
- T. praecox (Loew, 1844)
- T. prolixa Hardy & Drew, 1996
- T. protrusa Hardy & Drew, 1996
- T. pterostigma Chen, 1938
- T. pulchra (Loew, 1844)
- T. pumila Hardy & Drew, 1996
- T. puncta (Becker, 1908)
- T. pura (Loew, 1873)
- T. quasiprolixa Hardy & Drew, 1996
- T. rasa Séguy, 1934
- T. recurrens Loew, 1869
- T. robusta Korneyev, 2013
- T. rufina Rondani, 1871
- T. rufipennis Doane, 1899
- T. ruralis (Loew, 1844)
- T. rydeni Hering, 1956
- T. sahandi Khaghaninia, et al., 2011
- T. santolinae Hering, 1934
- T. sauterina Merz, 1994
- T. schelkovnikovi Zaitzev, 1945
- T. scitula (Wulp, 1900)
- T. scorzonerae Merz, 1993
- T. separata Rondani, 1871
- T. shansiana Chen, 1940
- T. signatipennis Foote, 1960
- T. simplex (Loew, 1844)
- T. sinensis Chen, 1940
- T. sinica (Wang, 1990)
- T. sonchina Hering, 1937
- T. spreta (Loew, 1861)
- T. stictica Loew, 1862
- T. stigmatica (Coquillett, 1899)
- T. subpura (Johnson, 1909)
- T. subradiata Wulp, 1900
- T. tanaceti Hering, 1956
- T. tasmaniae Hardy & Drew, 1996
- T. tatarica Portschinsky, 1891
- T. theryi Séguy, 1930
- T. thoracica Malloch, 1931
- T. triangula Ito, 1952
- T. tridentata Korneyev & Namin, 2013
- T. truncata (Loew, 1844)
- T. trupanea Hardy & Drew, 1996
- T. trypaneina Hering, 1953
- T. turkeri Kütük & Yaran, 2020
- T. umbrosa Dirlbek & Dirlbek, 1968
- T. urelliosomima Korneyev & J.Dirlbek, 2000
- T. valida (Loew, 1858)
- T. variata (Becker, 1908)
- T. vespertina (Loew, 1844)
- T. volkovitshi (Richter, 1995)
- T. webbii Doane, 1899
- T. wulpi Norrbom, 1999
- T. zernyi Hendel, 1927
