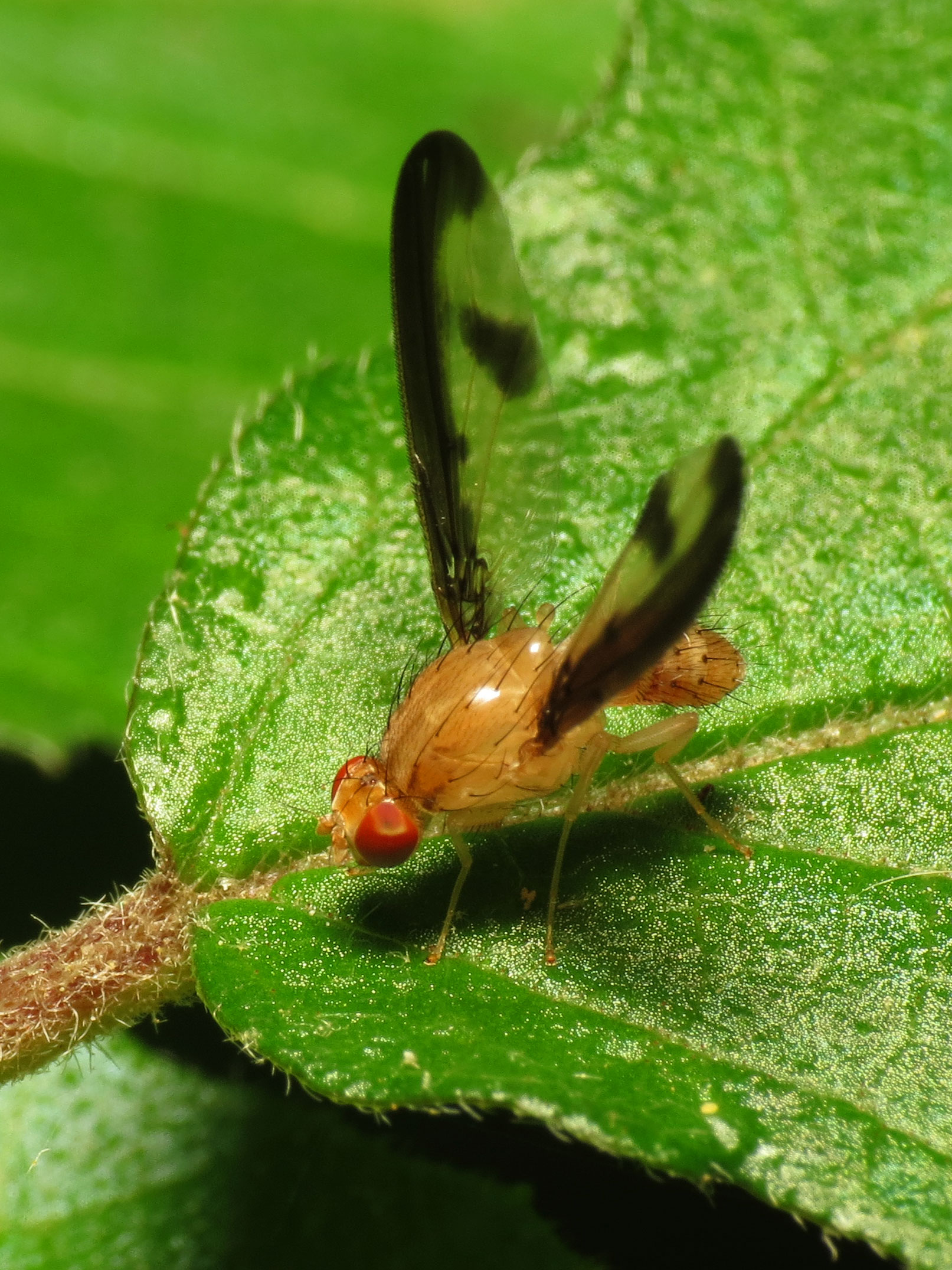

Scientific classification
- Kingdom: Animalia
- Phylum: Arthropoda
- Clade: Pancrustacea
- Class: Insecta
- Order: Diptera
- Family: Pallopteridae
- Genus: Toxonevra
- Species: T. superba

Binomial name
- Toxonevra superba (Loew, 1861)

= Toxonevra superba =

Species of fly

Toxonevra superba, also known as the antlered flutter fly, is a species of flutter fly in the family Pallopteridae. The species is native to eastern North America.

== Description ==
Adults are yellowish-brown in color and are 3 to 6 mm in length. They have clear wings with dark brown markings that resemble antlers. The upper thorax has two pale stripes and two parallel rows of bristles. They have two large compound eyes and three ocelli.

The species occurs from the US states of Maine and Minnesota to Georgia and Nebraska, as well as from Nova Scotia to Alberta. The larvae feed on plants and may prey upon the larvae of the bark beetle. The species lives in moist, shady places, and the males extend and vibrate their wings like other Pallopteridae.
