= Farský =

Farský is a Czech surname. Notable people with the surname include:

- František Farský (1846–1927), Czech agronomist and chemist
- Jan Farský (born 1979), Czech politician
- Karel Farský (1880–1927), Czech Roman Catholic priest
