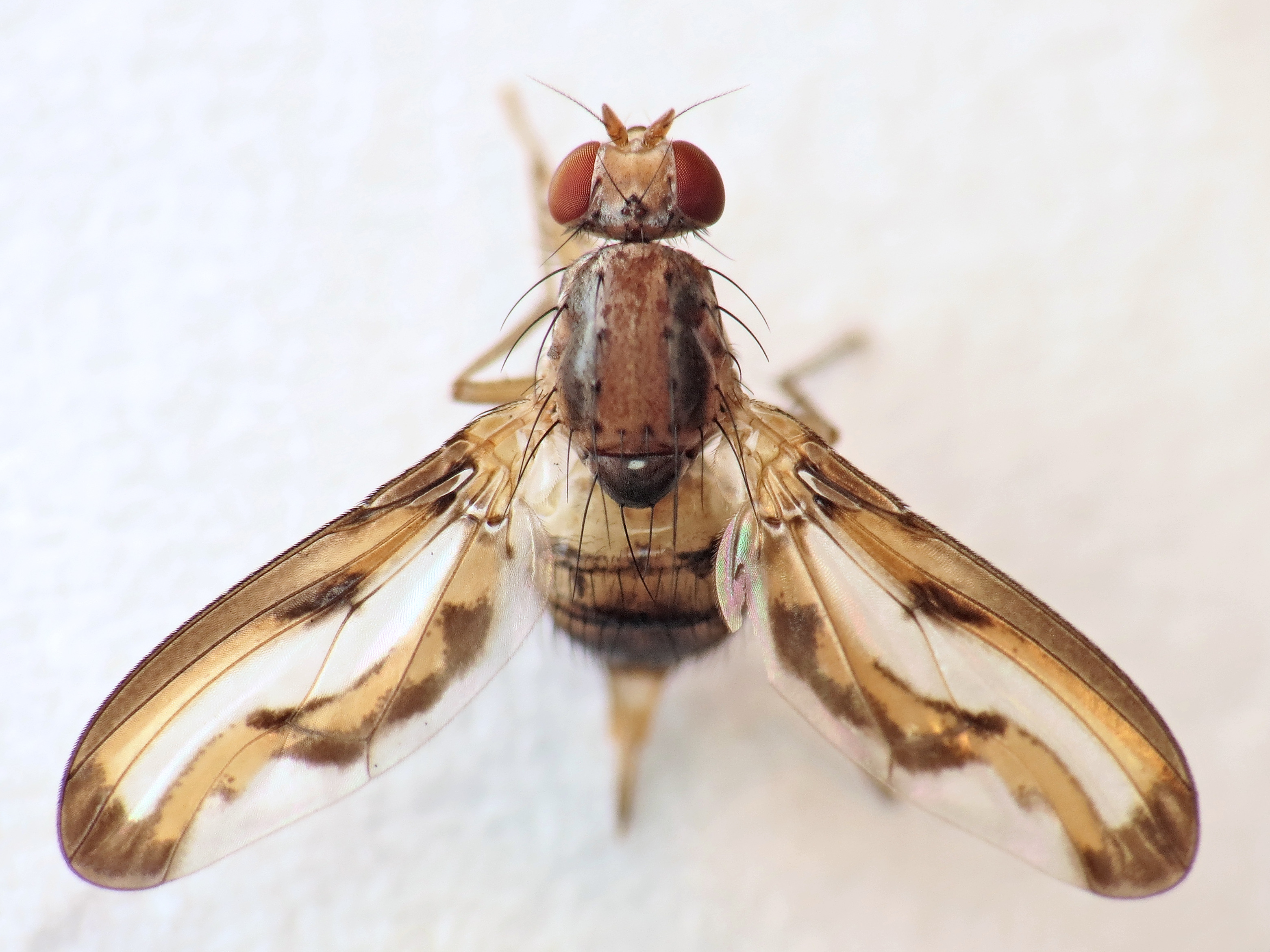

Scientific classification
- Kingdom: Animalia
- Phylum: Arthropoda
- Clade: Pancrustacea
- Class: Insecta
- Order: Diptera
- Family: Pallopteridae
- Genus: Toxonevra
- Species: T. muliebris

Binomial name
- Toxonevra muliebris (Harris, 1780)

Synonyms
- Musca muliebris Harris, 1780; Toxoneura muliebris (Harris, 1780); Scatophaga lobata Fabricius, 1805; Toxonevra fasciata Macquart, 1835

= Toxonevra muliebris =

Species of fly

Toxonevra muliebris is a species of flutter fly in the family Pallopteridae. It has been found in Europe and North America. The pattern on the wings of this species is distinctive.

== Taxonomy ==
This species was first described by Moses Harris under the name Musca muliebris. Subsequently, this species has been included within the genus Palloptera. It has also been known under the name Toxoneura muliebris. However this name is regarded as being a misspelling of the genus Toxonevra. It is currently known as Toxonevra muliebris.

== Description ==
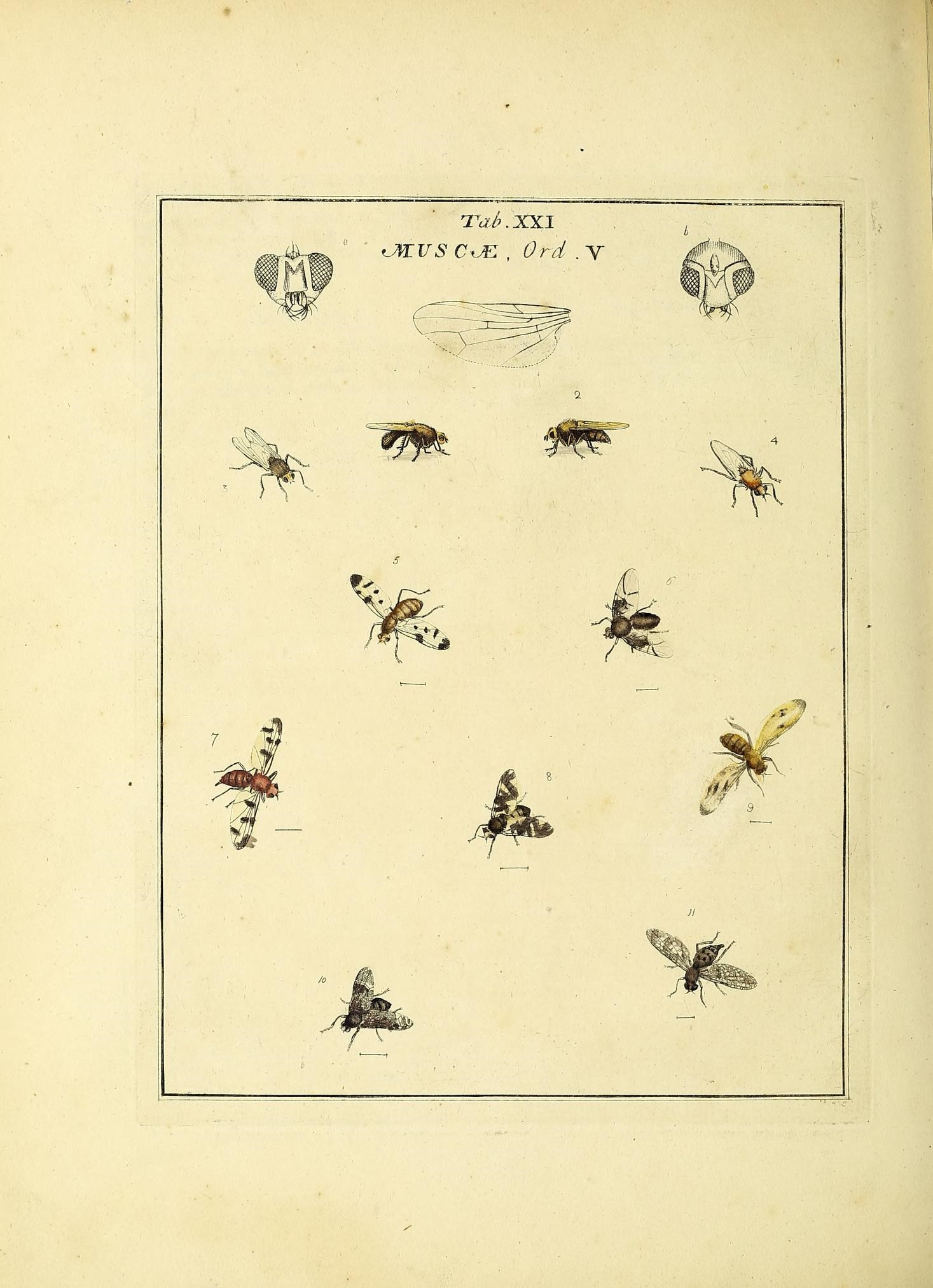
An exposition of English insects Plate XXI Fig 9 is Toxonevra muliebris

Morris described this species as follows:

Measures two lines. The head, thorax, abdomen and legs, are of a pleasant pale brown. The wings are clear, having two broadish brown stripes from the apex to the shoulder, one of which lies along the sector edge, the other through the middle. This pretty fly is very scarce: it shakes its wings as it walks, like the Vibrans, and is not soon frightened away.

The pattern on the wings of adults is distinctive and is a diagnostic feature when identifying this species.

== Distribution ==
This species is native to Europe, and has been observed in countries such as Spain, Italy, Austria, France, Belgium, Great Britain and Ireland. Recently it has been observed and collected in North America.

== Ecology ==
The larvae of this species have been found under tree bark and it has been hypothesised that they feed on beetle larvae. In North America adults of this species have also been discovered inside residential houses. It has been suggested that this is as a result of larvae of T. mulibris preferring to prey on the larvae of carpet beetles, a common household pest in North America.
