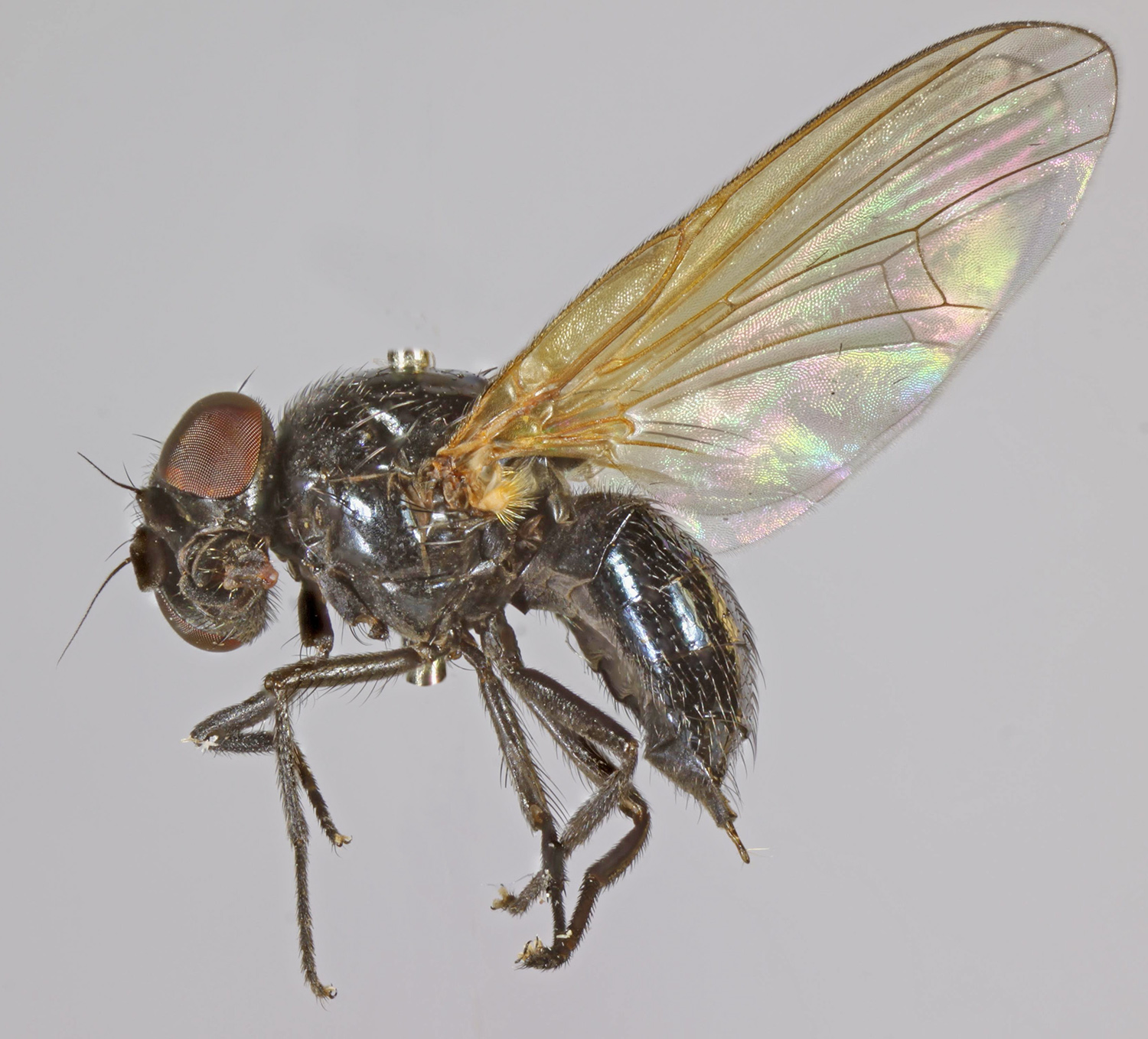
- Silba fumosa North Wales

Scientific classification
- Kingdom: Animalia
- Phylum: Arthropoda
- Class: Insecta
- Order: Diptera
- Family: Lonchaeidae
- Genus: Silba
- Species: S. fumosa

Binomial name
- Silba fumosa (Egger, 1863)

Synonyms
- Lonchaea fumosa Egger, 1863; Setisquamalonchaea fumosa (Egger, 1862); Lonchaea flavipennis Morge, 1959; Setisquamalonchaea flavipennis (Morge, 1959); Setisquamalonchaea flavidipennis

= Silba fumosa =

Species of fly

Silba fumosa is a species of fly in the family Lonchaeidae. It is found in the Palearctic.The flies reach a body length of about 4 millimeters. Their body is metallic dark blue in color. The mesonotum is dull in the male and shiny along the middle in the female. The legs are black, the wings brownish. The tegulum has a light seta fringe.They are found in mature woodland.
