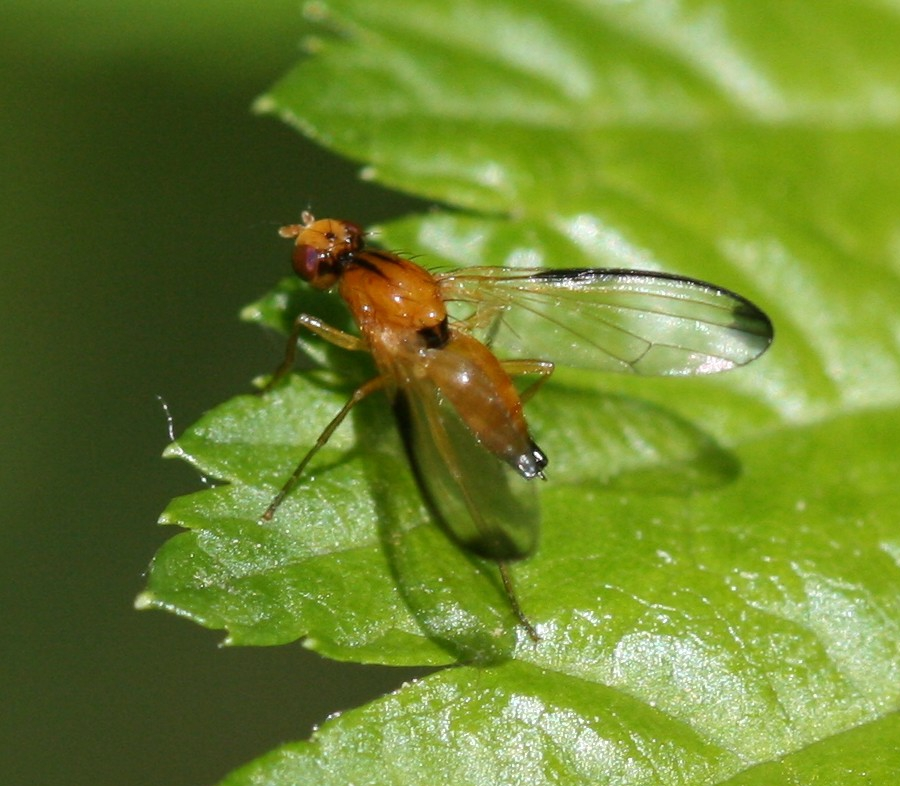

Scientific classification
- Kingdom: Animalia
- Phylum: Arthropoda
- Class: Insecta
- Order: Diptera
- Family: Pallopteridae
- Genus: Palloptera
- Species: P. saltuum

Binomial name
- Palloptera saltuum (Linnaeus, 1758)

Synonyms
- Musca saltuum Linnaeus, 1758

= Palloptera saltuum =

Species of fly

Palloptera saltuum is a species of fly in the family Pallopteridae. It is found in the Palearctic.
