= Palloptera subusta =

Scientific classification
- Domain: Eukaryota
- Kingdom: Animalia
- Phylum: Arthropoda
- Class: Insecta
- Order: Diptera
- Family: Pallopteridae
- Genus: Palloptera
- Species: P. subusta

Binomial name
- Palloptera subusta Malloch, 1924

Species of fly

Palloptera subusta is a species of flutter fly in the family Pallopteridae.
