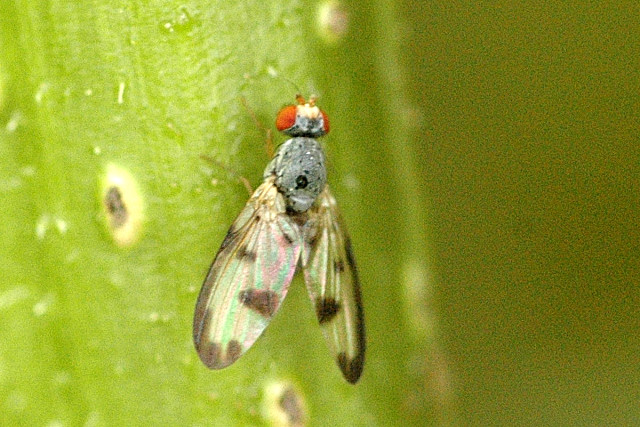

Scientific classification
- Kingdom: Animalia
- Phylum: Arthropoda
- Class: Insecta
- Order: Diptera
- Family: Pallopteridae
- Genus: Palloptera
- Species: P. umbellatarum

Binomial name
- Palloptera umbellatarum (Fabricius, 1775)

= Palloptera umbellatarum =

Species of fly

Video of a Palloptera umbellatarum

Palloptera umbellatarum is a species of fly in the family Pallopteridae. It is found in the Palearctic.
