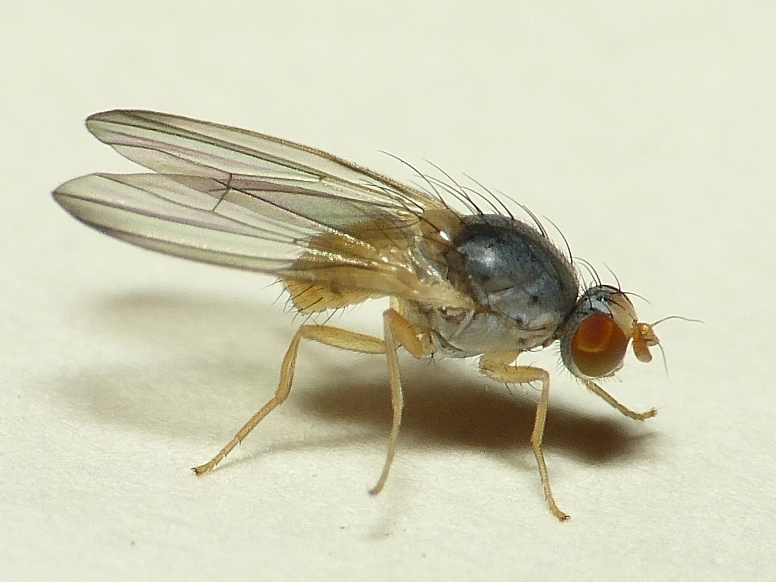
- Palloptera ustulata Netherlands

Scientific classification
- Kingdom: Animalia
- Phylum: Arthropoda
- Class: Insecta
- Order: Diptera
- Family: Pallopteridae
- Genus: Palloptera
- Species: P. ustulata

Binomial name
- Palloptera ustulata Fallen, 1820

= Palloptera ustulata =

Species of fly

Palloptera ustulata is a species of fly in the family Pallopteridae. It is found in the Palearctic The wings are diffusely shaded brown with a darker tip. The back of the head is largely black.The face and antennae are yellow.The thorax is black with a fairly long whitish pilosity (also found on the yellow abdomen).The legs, tarsi and halteres are yellowish.Long. : 4 mm.The larvae develop under the bark of deciduous trees. It is part of a species complex and difficult to determine with certainty.
