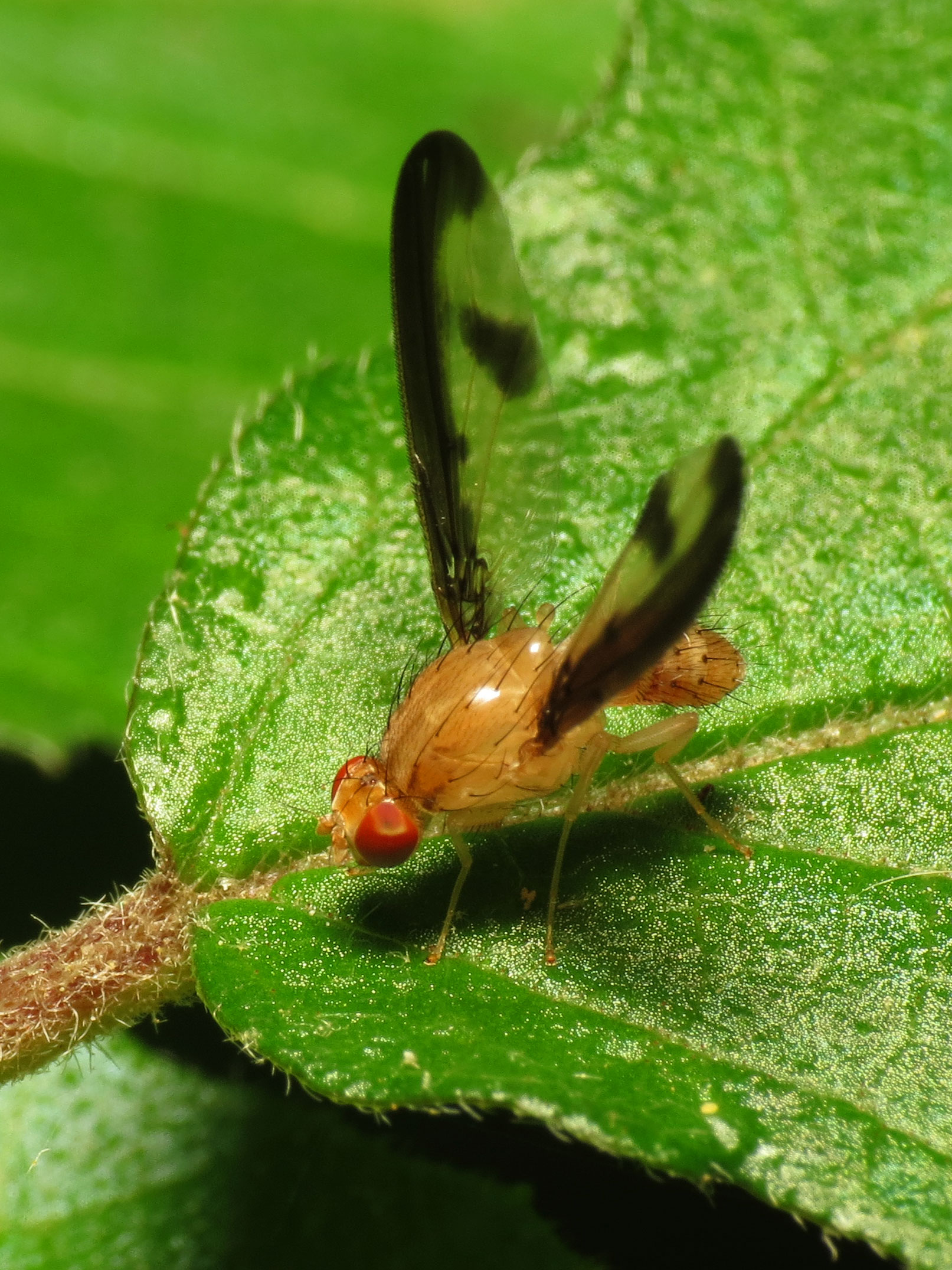
- Toxonevra superba

Scientific classification
- Domain: Eukaryota
- Kingdom: Animalia
- Phylum: Arthropoda
- Class: Insecta
- Order: Diptera
- Family: Pallopteridae
- Genus: Toxonevra; Macquart, 1835

= Toxonevra =

Genus of flies

Toxonevra is a genus of flutter flies in the family Pallopteridae. There are about eight described species in Toxonevra.

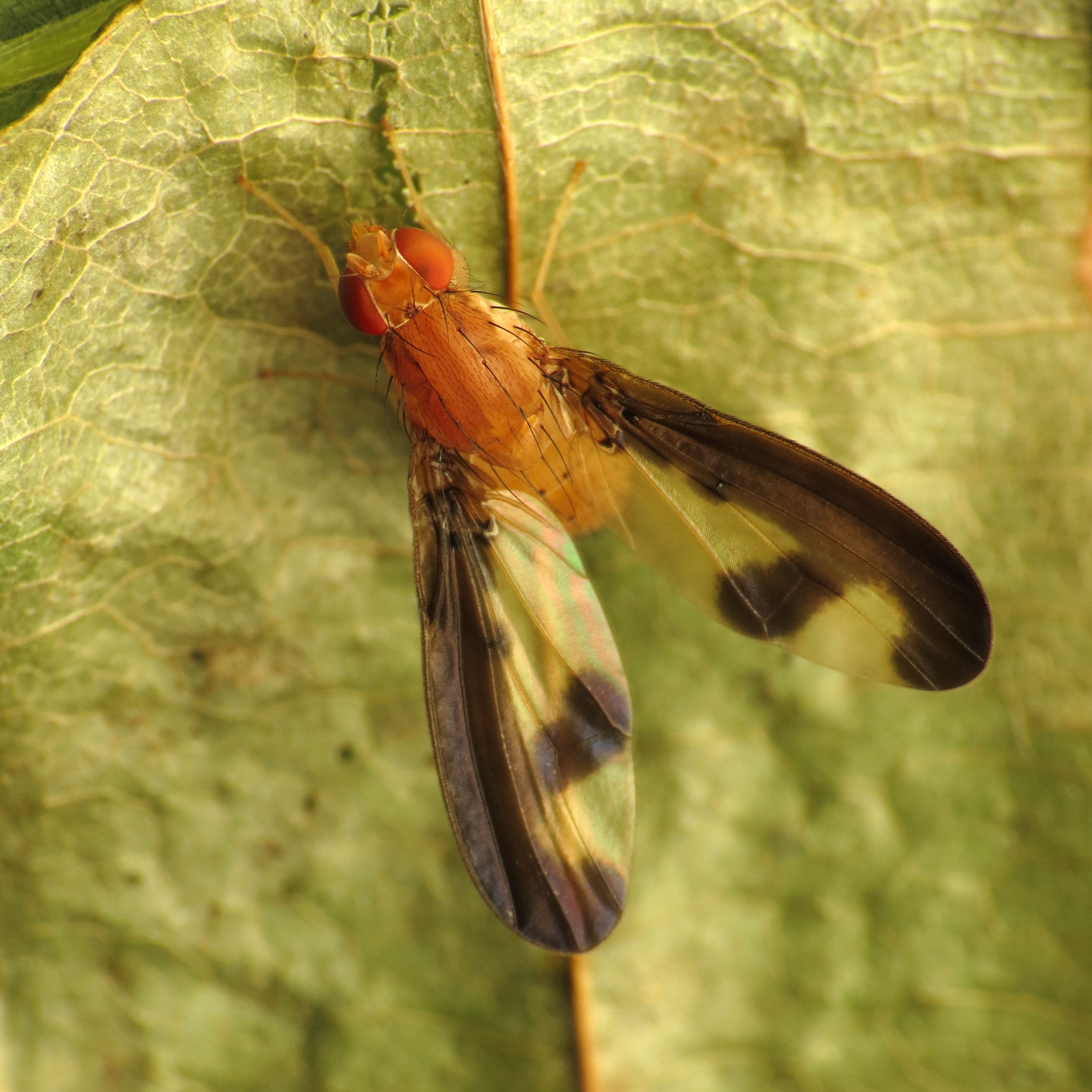
Toxonevra superba

== Species ==
These eight species belong to the genus Toxonevra:

- T. alticola Ozerov, 1994^{c g}
- T. carterosoma Ozerov, 1993^{c g}
- T. jucunda (Loew, 1863)^{c g b}
- T. muliebris (Harris, 1780)
- T. paralia Ozerov, 1993^{c g}
- T. similis (Johnson, 1910)^{c g}
- T. striata Merz & Sueyoshi, 2002^{c g}
- T. superba (Loew, 1861)^{c g b}

Data sources: i = ITIS, c = Catalogue of Life, g = GBIF, b = Bugguide.net
