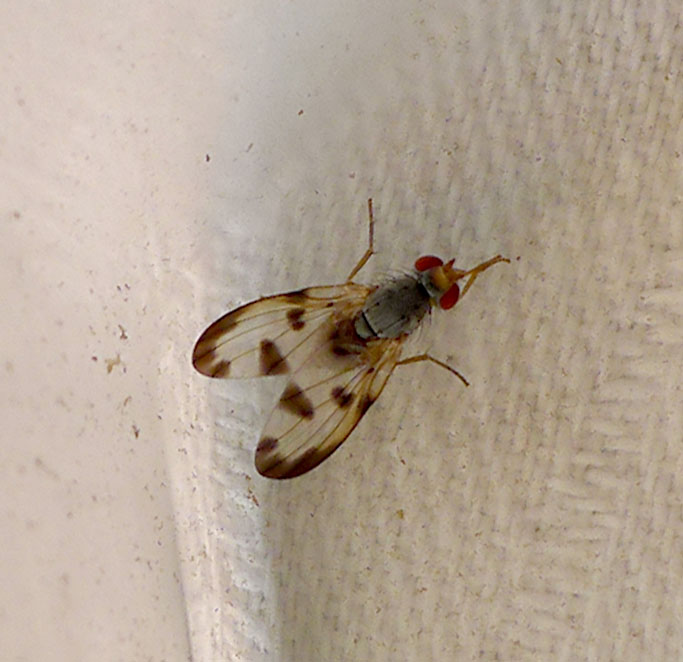

Scientific classification
- Domain: Eukaryota
- Kingdom: Animalia
- Phylum: Arthropoda
- Class: Insecta
- Order: Diptera
- Family: Pallopteridae
- Genus: Palloptera; Fallén, 1820

Species
- See text

= Palloptera =

Genus of flies

Palloptera is a genus of flutter flies in the family Pallopteridae. There are at least 30 described species in Palloptera.

== Species ==
Approximately 33 species belong to the genus Palloptera:

- P. albertensis Johnson, 1921
- P. ambusta (Meigen, 1826)
- P. anderssoni Rotheray & MacGowan, 1999
- P. basimaculata Czerny, 1934
- P. bimaculata Strobl, 1910
- P. claripennis Malloch, 1924
- P. elegans Merz & Chen, 2005
- P. ephippium Zetterstedt, 1860
- P. flava Oldenberg, 1910
- P. formosa Frey, 1930
- †P. hypolithica Zhang. 1989 (Burdigalian, China)
- P. kloiberi Morge, 1967
- P. kukumorensis Czerny, 1934
- P. laetabilis Loew, 1873
- P. longipennis Czerny, 1934
- P. maculifemur Czerny, 1934
- P. marginata (Meigen, 1826)
- P. modesta (Meigen, 1830)
- †P. morticina Scudder, 1877 (Eocene, British Columbia)
- P. orientata Kovalev, 1972
- P. pallens Loew, 1873
- P. quinquemaculata (Macquart, 1835)
- P. saltuum (Linnaeus, 1758)
- P. scutellata (Macquart, 1835)
- P. septentrionalis Czerny, 1934
- P. setosa Melander, 1913
- P. subusta Malloch, 1924
- P. terminalis Loew, 1863
- P. trimacula (Meigen, 1826)
- P. umbellatarum (Fabricius, 1775)
- P. usta (Meigen, 1826)
- P. ustulata Fallén, 1820
- P. venusta Loew, 1858
