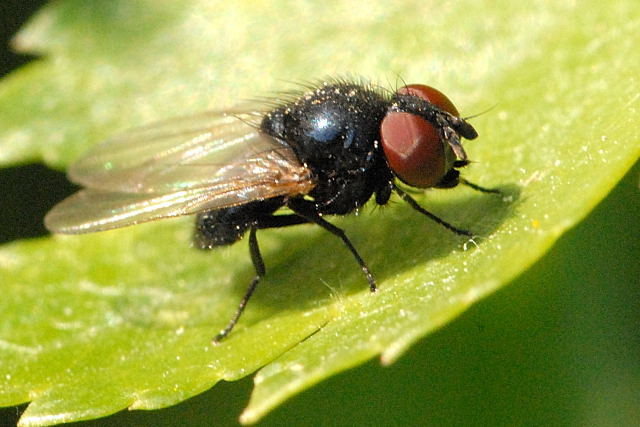

Scientific classification
- Kingdom: Animalia
- Phylum: Arthropoda
- Class: Insecta
- Order: Diptera
- Family: Lonchaeidae
- Genus: Lonchaea
- Species: L. chorea

Binomial name
- Lonchaea chorea (Fabricius, 1781)

Synonyms
- Musca chorea (Fabricius, 1781); Lonchaea vaginalis Fallén, 1820; Lonchaea flavidipennis Zetterstedt, 1847

= Lonchaea chorea =

Species of fly

Lonchaea chorea is a species of fly in the family Lonchaeidae. It is found in the Palearctic. The larva develops in cow dung.

== Description ==
For terms see Morphology of Diptera. Long 3–5 mm. Male interocular space eye twice as wide as the antenna, more narrow in front. Thorax and abdomen shiny black with blue, green or purple reflections. Wings more or less yellow at the base. Squamae with long marginal cilia. Black halteres. Short subdiscoid abdomen.

Female interocular space slightly less wide than the eye. Lunula with white pruinosity. Antenna dark brown and extended to the epistome.

== Biology ==
March–December, on leaves, bushes, shrubs, etc. Larva under old bark, in cow dung, causing decay in beets, under the bark of pine with Tomicus piniperda under Quercus bark.

== Distribution ==
partial Throughout Europe, from Ireland Sweden to Spain and Italy. Macedonia. Also Ecuador.

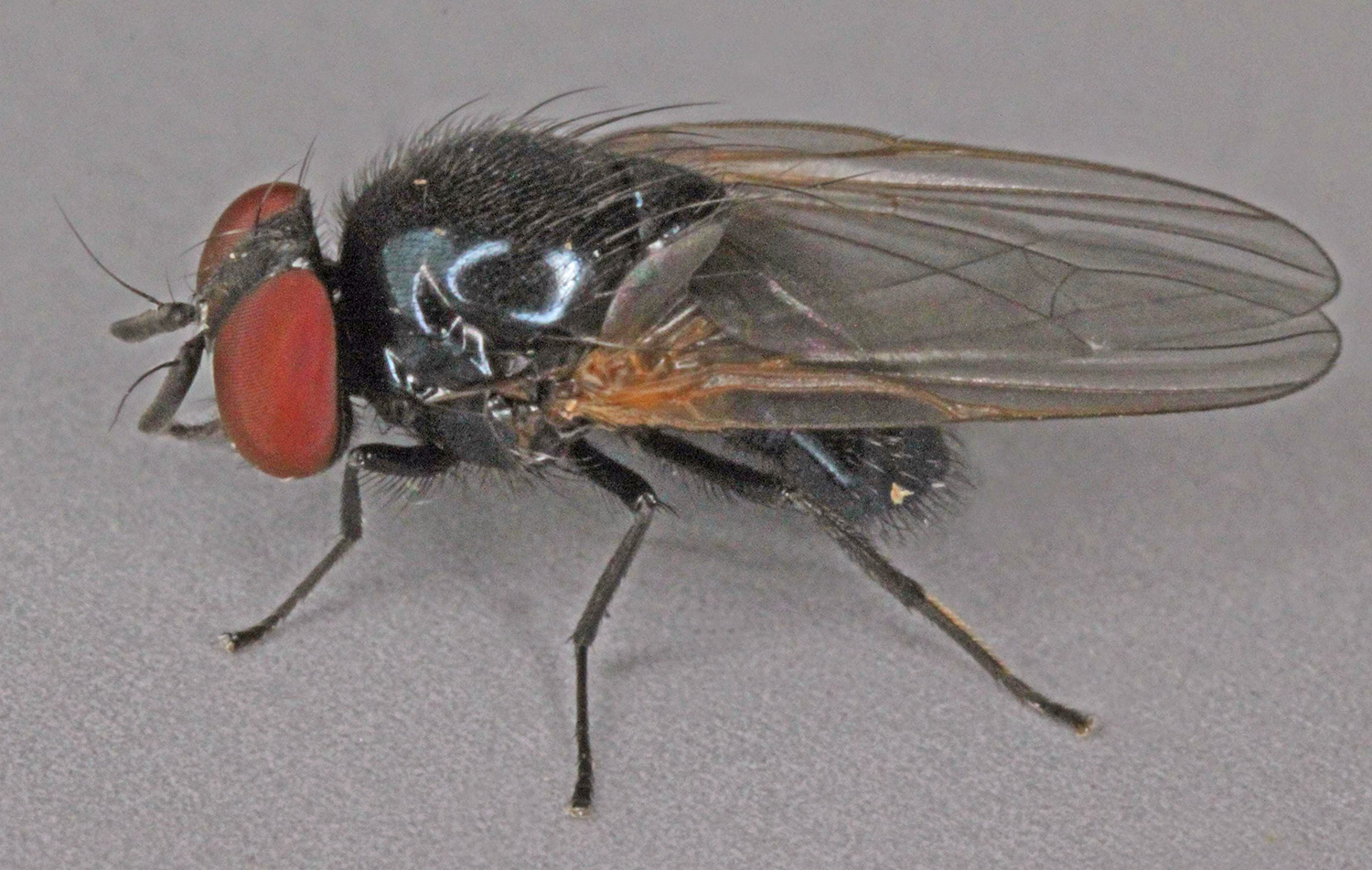

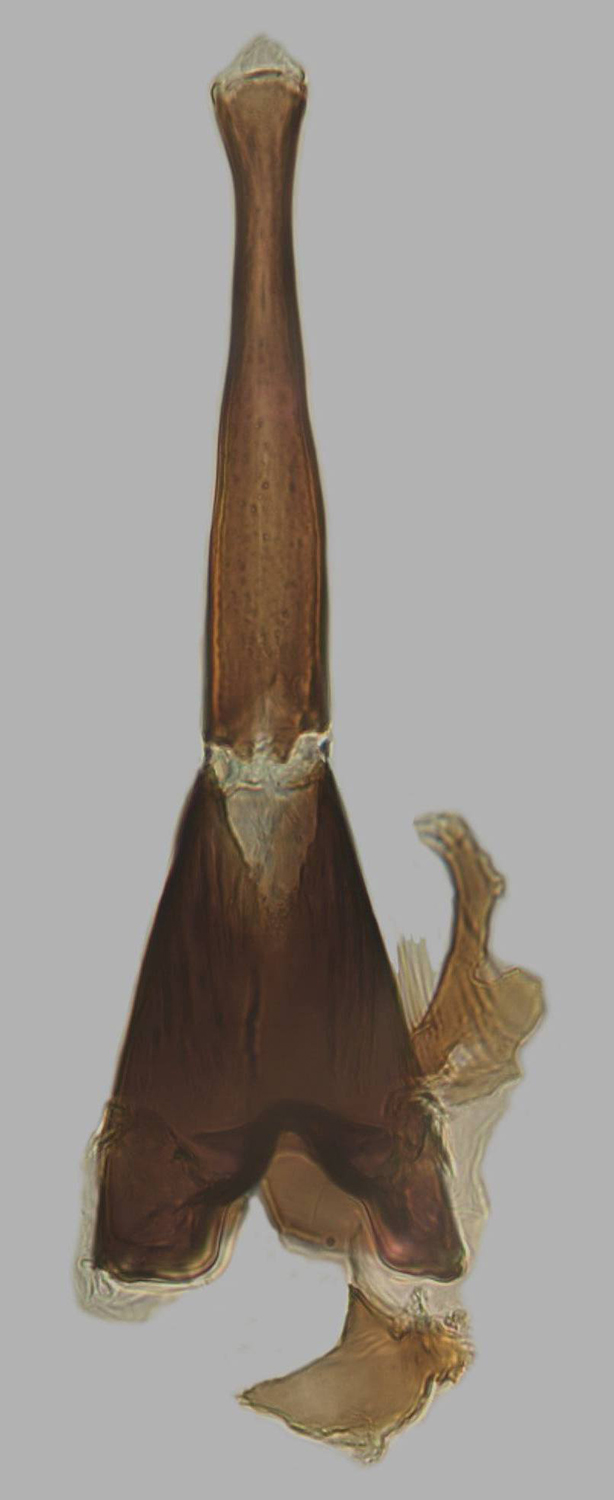
aedeagus

video
