= František Farský =

Czech agronomist and entomologist

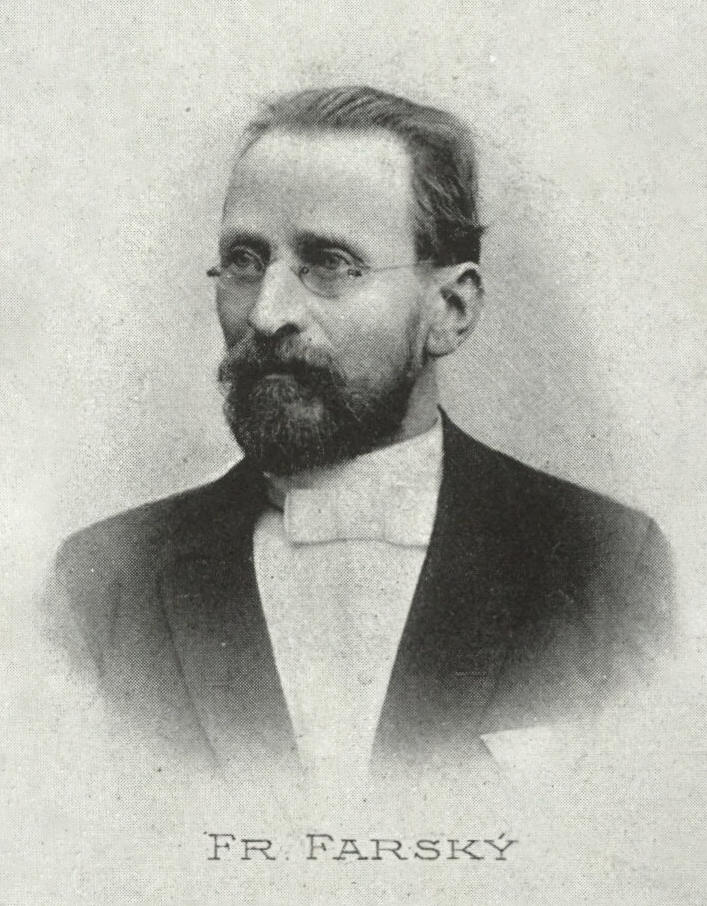

František Farský or in German form as Franz Farský (16 February 1846 – 23 January 1927) was a Czech agronomist and entomologist. He was a director of the higher school of economics at Tábor. He conducted chemical analytical studies on minerals and contributed to agricultural chemistry. He also described some insect pests.

== Life and work ==
Farský was born in Ruprechtice (today part of Liberec) in a family of bakers and farmers. He studied science in Liberec from 1860 and in 1866 he went to study chemistry at the Prague Polytechnic. He became an assistant to Vojtěch Šafařík in 1870 in the department of general and analytical chemistry. He became a teacher at the Prague brewing school and then at a municipal high school in Rakovník. He joined the Economics Academy at Tábor in 1873 to teach chemistry and in 1876 he became its director. In 1874 he founded a research station where he had new buildings, labs, and libraries set up in 1904. He retired to Prague in 1909.

Farský was a pioneer of agrochemistry and along with Julio Stoklasa he conducted studies on plant biochemistry. He also examined the chemistry of the soils, minerals, and the waters around Tábor. He also made measurements of carbon dioxide in the air from 1874 to 1875 and found it to be around 3.43%. He examined the application of chemical fertilizers. He described the life histories of Lonchaea flies affecting turnip cultivation. He wrote popular articles and contributed to Otto's academic dictionary. He also gave lectures and advice to farmers.

Farský married Marie Křížková in 1876. He was awarded the Knight's Cross of the Order of Francis Joseph in 1892.
