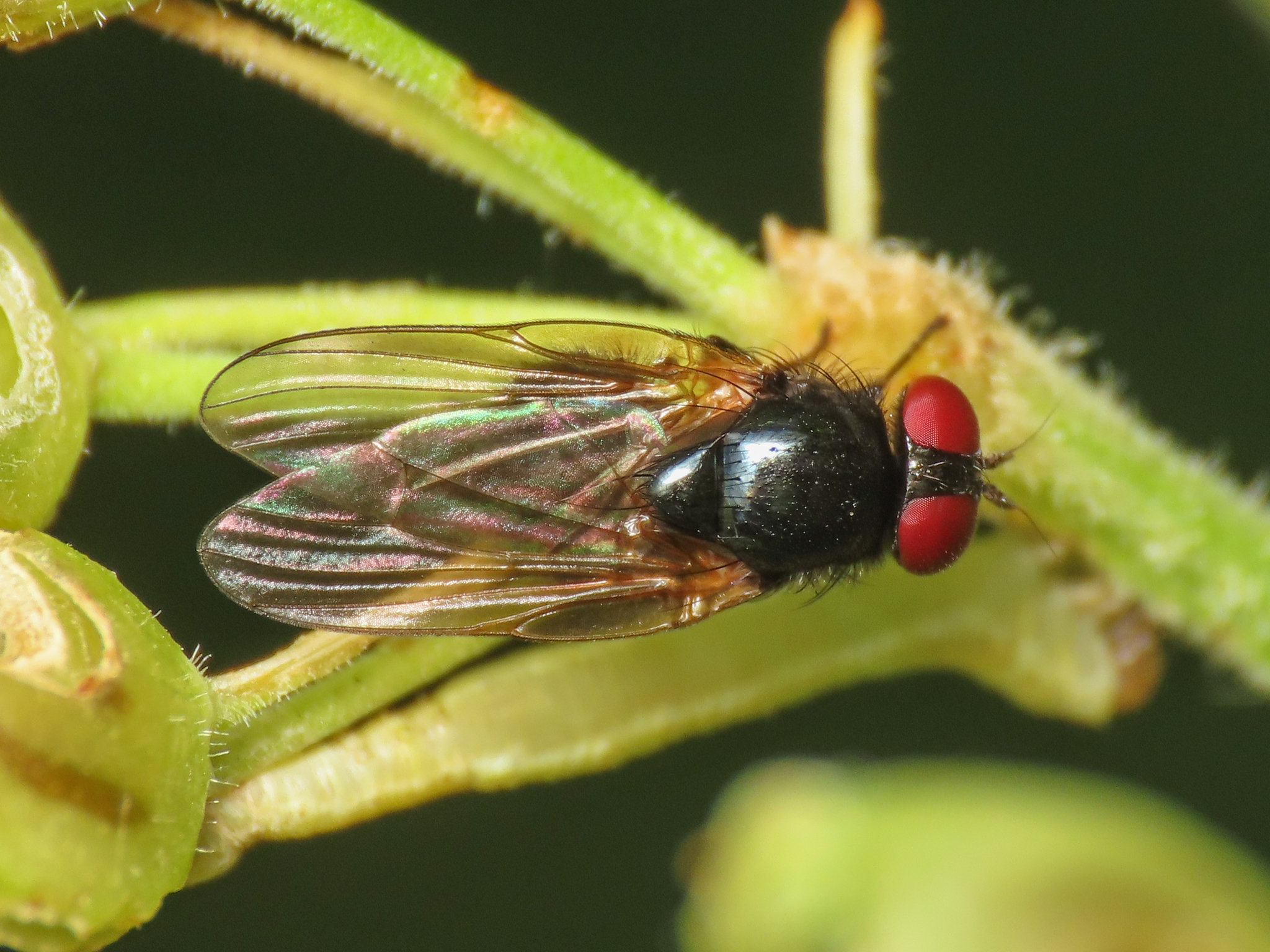
- Silba fumosa, Italy

Scientific classification
- Domain: Eukaryota
- Kingdom: Animalia
- Phylum: Arthropoda
- Class: Insecta
- Order: Diptera
- Family: Lonchaeidae
- Subfamily: Lonchaeinae
- Tribe: Lonchaeini
- Genus: Silba; Macquart, 1851

= Silba (fly) =

Genus of flies

Silba is a genus of lance flies in the family Lonchaeidae. There are more than 120 described species in Silba, found on every continent except South America and Antarctica.

== Species ==
These 122 species belong to the genus Silba:

- Silba abstata McAlpine, 1956
- Silba adelosa McAlpine, 1964
- Silba adipata McAlpine, 1956
- Silba admirabilis McAlpine, 1956
- Silba albisquama (Kertész, 1901)
- Silba andasibe MacGowan, 2019
- Silba apodesma McAlpine, 1961
- Silba arcana McAlpine, 1961
- Silba atratula (Walker, 1860)
- Silba bakongo MacGowan, 2015
- Silba bambusae MacGowan, 2007
- Silba bidenticulata McAlpine, 1964
- Silba bifurcata MacGowan, 2005
- Silba bisulcata (Bezzi, 1920)
- Silba botanica MacGowan, 2007
- Silba boulangi MacGowan, 2015
- Silba bredoi MacGowan, 2015
- Silba breviplumosa MacGowan, 2007
- Silba budongo MacGowan, 2005
- Silba calceus MacGowan, 2005
- Silba caliginosa McAlpine, 1964
- Silba callida McAlpine, 1964
- Silba calva (Bezzi, 1914)
- Silba cameronia MacGowan, 2005
- Silba candidala McAlpine, 1964
- Silba capsicarum McAlpine, 1956
- Silba cascadens MacGowan, 2007
- Silba chalkei McAlpine, 1956
- Silba citricola (Bezzi, 1914)
- Silba combi MacGowan, 2007
- Silba consentanea (Walker, 1860)
- Silba cucumeris McAlpine, 1964
- Silba cupraria (Meijere, 1910)
- Silba denticulata MacGowan, 2005
- Silba devians (Hennig, 1948)
- Silba displata McAlpine, 1964
- Silba emulata McAlpine, 1964
- Silba erecta MacGowan & Ariomoto, 2020
- Silba erromango MacGowan, 2021
- Silba excisa (Kertész, 1901)
- Silba eximia McAlpine, 1964
- Silba ficiperda (Bezzi, 1914)
- Silba figurata MacGowan, 2005
- Silba filamenta MacGowan & Barták, 2022
- Silba flavitarsis MacGowan, 2004
- Silba foldvarii MacGowan, 2007
- Silba fumosa (Egger, 1863)
- Silba fungicola MacGowan, 2020
- Silba garamba MacGowan, 2015
- Silba gibbosa (Meijere, 1910)
- Silba gongeti MacGowan, 2005
- Silba hambai MacGowan, 2015
- Silba hebridensis MacGowan, 2021
- Silba hirticeps MacGowan, 2005
- Silba horridomedea McAlpine, 1964
- Silba imitata McAlpine, 1964
- Silba inimvua MacGowan, 2015
- Silba inubiwa MacGowan & Okamoto, 2020
- Silba ischnopoda Macgowan & Compton, 2018
- Silba ishigaki MacGowan & Okamoto, 2020
- Silba isla MacGowan, 2005
- Silba israel MacGowan & Freidberg, 2008
- Silba japonica MacGowan & Okamoto, 2020
- Silba kadavu MacGowan, 2014
- Silba kuantani MacGowan, 2023
- Silba laevis (Bezzi, 1920)
- Silba lashker MacGowan & Razak
- Silba longidentata MacGowan, 2007
- Silba longigonite MacGowan, 2019
- Silba longistylus MacGowan, 2005
- Silba lubumbashi MacGowan, 2015
- Silba lucens (Meijere, 1910)
- Silba macrogonite MacGowan, 2019
- Silba malaysia (MacGowan, 2005)
- Silba mbuti MacGowan, 2015
- Silba microcercosa MacGowan, 2007
- Silba mitis (Curran, 1927)
- Silba mitsuii MacGowan, 2020
- Silba montana (Brunetti, 1913)
- Silba namibia MacGowan, 2005
- Silba neozopherosa McAlpine, 1964
- Silba nepalensis MacGowan, 2006
- Silba nigrispicata MacGowan, 2007
- Silba nigritella (Malloch, 1930)
- Silba nudoscutella McAlpine, 1964
- Silba ophyroides (Bezzi, 1920)
- Silba pallicarpa (Bezzi, 1920)
- Silba papei MacGowan, 2005
- Silba pappi Soós, 1977
- Silba parasita (Séguy, 1933)
- Silba pencila MacGowan, 2019
- Silba perplexa (Walker, 1860)
- Silba plumosissima (Bezzi, 1919)
- Silba pollinosa (Kertész, 1901)
- Silba quadridentata MacGowan, 2005
- Silba ramuscula McAlpine, 1964
- Silba retalionis (McAlpine, 1964)
- Silba rotherayi MacGowan, 2005
- Silba saegeri MacGowan, 2015
- Silba schachti MacGowan, 2004
- Silba septuosa McAlpine, 1964
- Silba setifera (Meijere, 1910)
- Silba setigonite MacGowan, 2019
- Silba setiphallus MacGowan, 2014
- Silba silbacola (MacGowan, 2006)
- Silba spatulata MacGowan, 2005
- Silba spiculata MacGowan, 2015
- Silba spinosa MacGowan, 2005
- Silba srilanka McAlpine, 1975
- Silba taciturna (Walker, 1859)
- Silba taiwanica (Hennig, 1948)
- Silba tekei MacGowan, 2015
- Silba tenuipennis MacGowan, 2007
- Silba thunbergii MacGowan & Ariomoto, 2020
- Silba translucens MacGowan, 2007
- Silba trigena MacGowan, 2004
- Silba uganda MacGowan, 2005
- Silba uniformis (Malloch, 1930)
- Silba upemba MacGowan, 2015
- Silba vanemdeni McAlpine, 1975
- Silba virescens Macquart, 1851
- Silba wittei MacGowan, 2015
