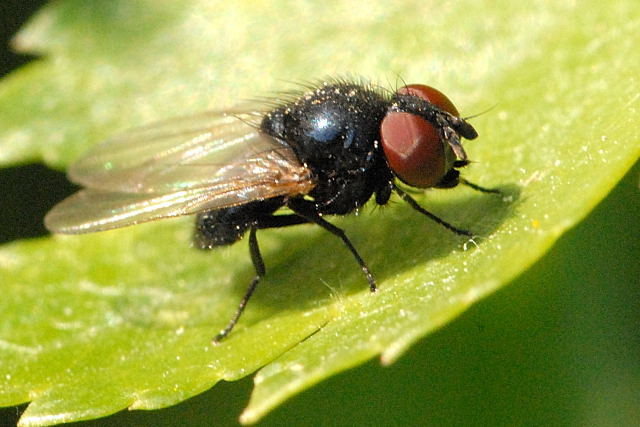
- Lonchaea chorea

Scientific classification
- Domain: Eukaryota
- Kingdom: Animalia
- Phylum: Arthropoda
- Class: Insecta
- Order: Diptera
- Superfamily: Lonchaeoidea
- Family: Lonchaeidae; Loew, 1861

Genera
- Chaetolonchaea; Dasiops; Earomyia; Lamprolonchaea; Lonchaea; Neosilba; Protearomyia; Setisquamalonchaea; Silba

= Lonchaeidae =

Family of flies

The Lonchaeidae are a family of acalyptrate flies commonly known as lance flies. 610 described species are placed into 10 genera. These are generally small but robustly built flies with blue-black or metallic bodies. They are found, most commonly in wooded areas, throughout the world with the exception of polar regions and New Zealand. Details of the distribution of genera and species by biogeographic realm are included in the World Catalogue of the family Lonchaeidae

== Description ==
For terms see Morphology of Diptera.

The Lonchaeids are small flies with a black or blackish-blue body, which is often metallic, glossy, and with hyaline (lacking dark spots) wings. The head is hemispherical (shorter than high) and the lunule is well defined. The third antennal segment is usually elongated and the antennae are decumbent. Ocelli are present and the postocellar bristles are divergent. The frons is narrow in males, and broad in females. One pair of orbital bristles is on the head. The postvertical bristles on the head are parallel or weakly divergent. Distinctive vibrissae on the head are lacking, but vibrissa-like bristles are present along the border of the mouth. A subapical bristle is absent on tibia. The wing venation is complete. The costa has two interruptions: near the humeral crossvein and before the subcostal vein. The subcostal vein varies in size. The anal vein of the wing is shortened. The abdomen is oval and rather flat, and in females has a long, sclerotized ovipositor.

This family is readily distinguished from the family Periscelididae by the entire subcostal vein, from the Sapromyzidae by the absence of preapical tibial bristles on at least the anterior and posterior tibia, and from Pallopteridae by the presence of a propleural bristle and the exposed frontal lunule.

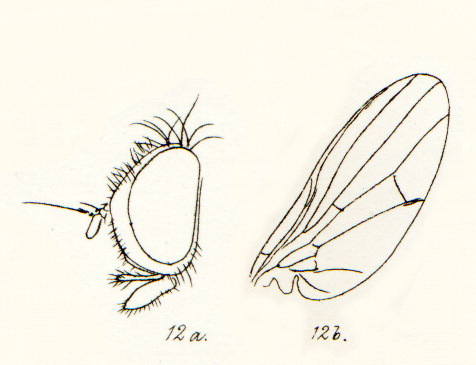
Morphological details of the Lonchaeidae

The larva is amphipneustic (has only the anterior and posterior pairs of spiracles) slender tapering at the anterior, and smooth except for ventral creeping welts. The cephalopharyngeal skeleton of the larva consists of two stout untoothed mandibles, a dental sclerite, an elongate hypopharyngeal sclerite, a parastomal bar, and an anvil-shaped tentoropharyngeal sclerite. The anterior spiracles (prothoracic spiracles) each have five to ten papillae which are arranged in a fan shape. The posterior spiracles (on the anal segment) are placed on a raised, sclerotized posterior spiracular tubercle. Each spiracle has three oval, radially arranged slits and four groups of branched spiracular hairs.

The pupa is enclosed within a puparium.

== Biology ==
Lonchaea sp. oviposits into the boreholes of beetles on a fallen beech

The larvae are mostly phytophagous, feeding on already damaged plant tissues, although coprophagous, mycophagous, saprophagous, and predatory species are known. Larvae may be found under bark, in tunnels of bark beetles, in decomposing wood and other decomposing plant residue, and in dung. Larvae of some species cause formation of galls on plants (including cereals), while larvae of other species live in juicy fruits (figs, etc.). Adult flies are found on trunks of trees, logs, cut wood, leaves of shrubs and in grasslands. Some species are agricultural pests. The polyphagous and oligophagous species of the family Tephritidae (also called fruit flies) and Lonchaeidae are one of the main pests of horticulture in the Neotropical region. For example, in the Neotropics, Neosilba perezi (Romero & Ruppel), known as the cassava shoot fly, is a pest of cassava (Manihot esculenta Crantz) andDasiops passifloris McAlpine infests the fruit of the corky-stemmed passion flower Passiflora pallida L. in the Americas. Several species in the genus Earomyia are pests of fir and spruce trees, the larvae larvar feeding on the seeds within the cones. The black fig-fly Silba adipata McAlpine is a pest of figs in the Mediterranean area but has also spread to South Africa, Mexico and California. The common European species Lonchaea chorea is synanthropic breeding in a wide range of decaying organic material.

== List of genera ==
A list of genera of Lonchaeidae Full details are published in the World catalogue of Lonchaeidae

Lamprolonchaea smaragdi (Lonchaeinae)

- Subfamily Dasiopinae
  - Dasiops Rondani, 1856
- Subfamily Lonchaeinae
  - Chaetolonchaea Czerny, 1934
  - Earomyia Zetterstedt, 1842
  - Fulgenta MacGowan, 2017
  - Hydrolysa MacGowan, 2022
  - Lamprolonchaea Bezzi, 1920
  - Lonchaea Fallen, 1820
  - Neosilba Waddill & Weems, 1978
  - Priscoearomyia Morge, 1963
  - Silba MacQuart, 1851

== Identification ==
- Czerny, L. 1934. Lonchaeidae. In: Lindner, E. (Ed.). Die Fliegen der Paläarktischen Region 5, 43, 1-40.. Keys to Palaearctic species but now needs revision (in German).
- Morge, G. (1963) Die Lonchaeidae und Pallopteridae Österreichs und der Angrenzenden Gebiete. 1. Teil: Die Lonchaeidae. Naturkundliches Jahrbuch der Stadt Linz 9: 123–313.
- Morge, G. 1959, 1962. Monographie der palearktischen Lonchaeidae Beitr. z. Entom., vol. 2, pp. 1–92, 323–371, 909–945; vol. 12, pp. 381–434.
- Stackelberg, A. A. Family Lonchaeidae in Bei-Bienko, G. Ya, 1988 Keys to the insects of the European Part of the USSR Volume 5 (Diptera) Part 2 English edition. Keys to Palaearctic species but now needs revision.
- Séguy, E. (1934) Diptères: Brachycères. II. Muscidae acalypterae, Scatophagidae. Paris: Éditions Faune de France 28.BibliothequeVirtuelleNumerique pdf
- MacGowan, I. & Rotheray, G. (2008) British Lonchaeidae (Diptera, Cyclorrhapha, Acalyptratae). Royal Entomological Society of London Handbook 10(15).
- K. G. V. Smith, 1989 An introduction to the immature stages of British Flies. Diptera Larvae, with notes on eggs, puparia and pupae. Handbooks for the Identification of British Insects Vol 10 Part 14. pdf download manual (two parts Main text and figures index)

== Image gallery ==
Images from Diptera.info

== Species lists ==
- World list
- West Palaearctic including Russia
- Australasian/Oceanian
- Nearctic
- Japan
