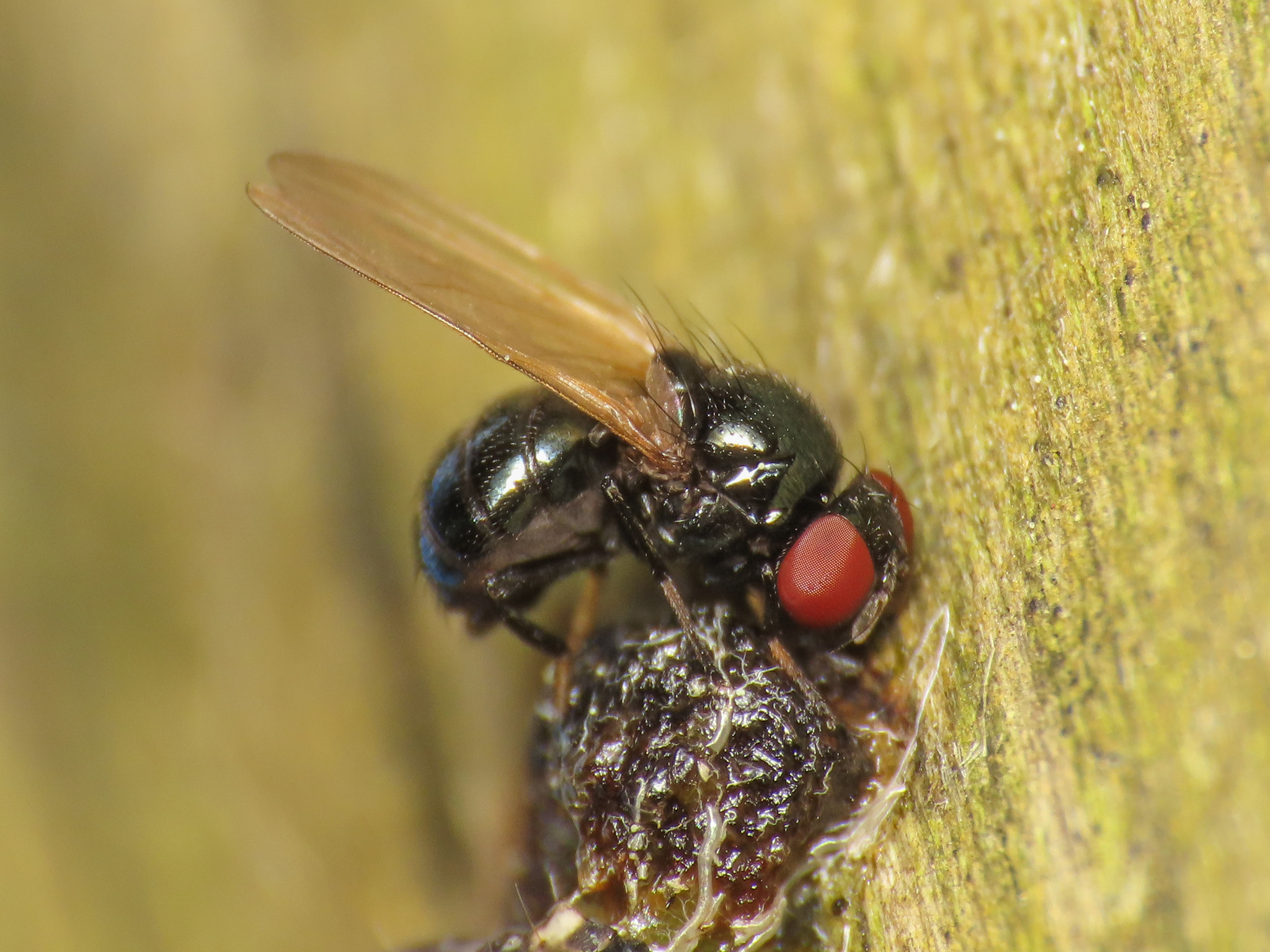
- Lonchaea, Italy

Scientific classification
- Domain: Eukaryota
- Kingdom: Animalia
- Phylum: Arthropoda
- Class: Insecta
- Order: Diptera
- Family: Lonchaeidae
- Genus: Lonchaea; Fallén, 1820

= Lonchaea =

Genus of flies

Lonchaea is a genus of lance flies in the family Lonchaeidae. There are at least 238 described species in Lonchaea, found worldwide.

Lonchaea, Oviposition into the boreholes of beetles on a fallen beech in a forest near Marburg, Hesse, Germany.

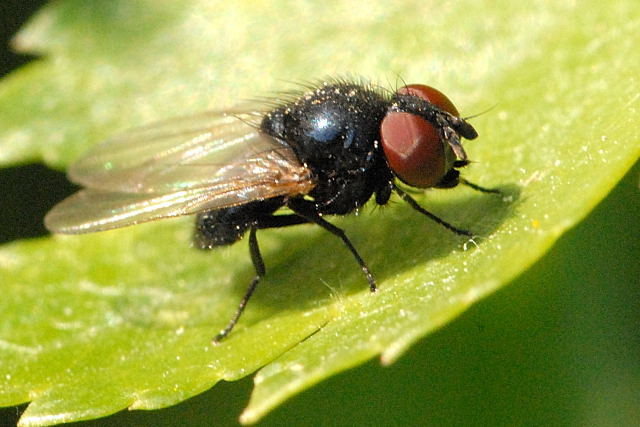
Lonchaea, Belgium

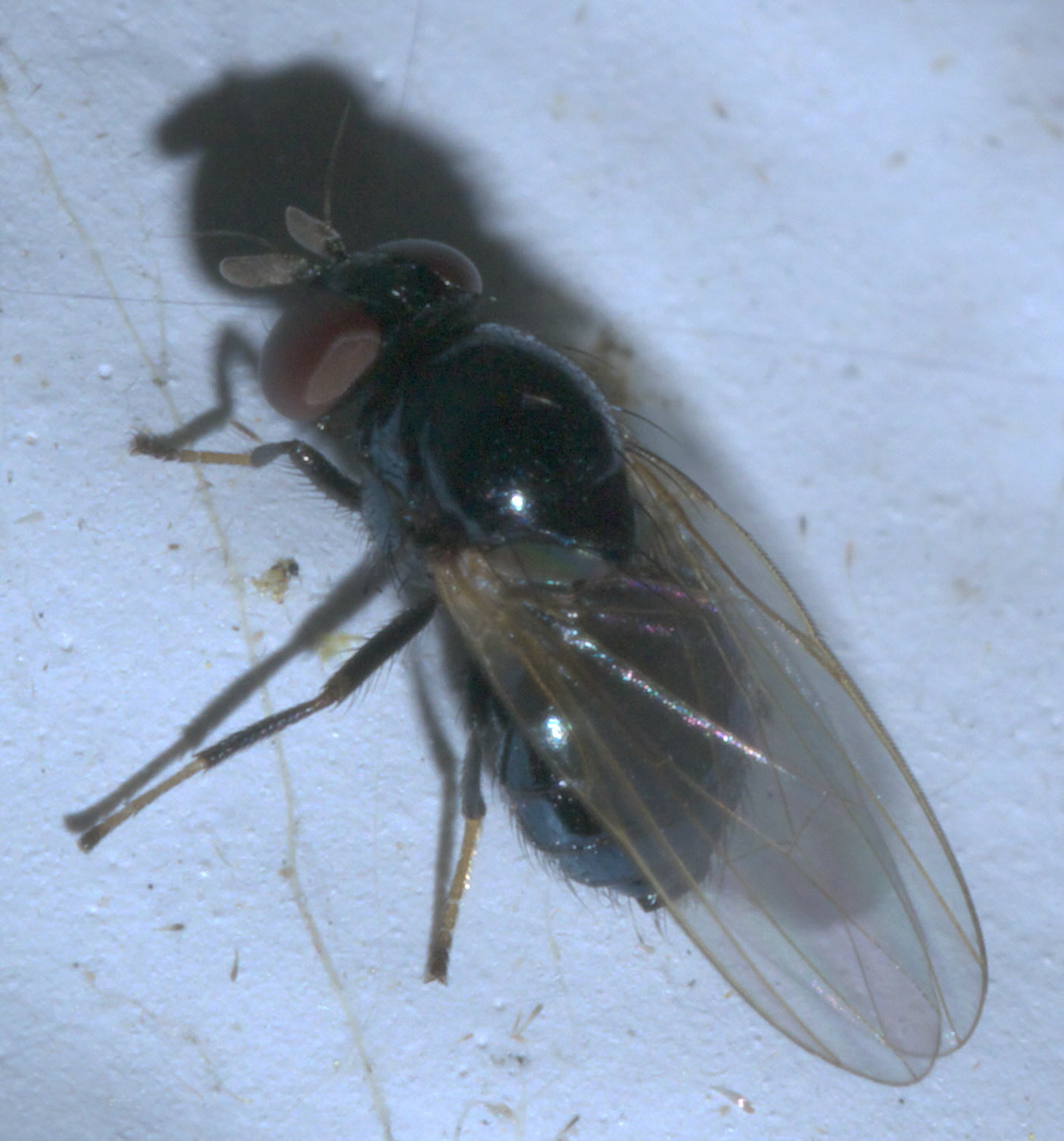
Lonchaea, Oklahoma

== Species ==
These 260 species belong to Lonchaea.

- Lonchaea aberdare MacGowan, 2018
- Lonchaea absenta MacGowan, 2004
- Lonchaea aculeata Bezzi, 1910
- Lonchaea affinis Malloch, 1920
- Lonchaea aithohirta McAlpine, 1964
- Lonchaea alameda McAlpine, 1964
- Lonchaea albidala McAlpine, 1964
- Lonchaea albigena Collin, 1953
- Lonchaea albimanus Walker, 1858
- Lonchaea albitarsis Zetterstedt, 1837 (Dung fly)
- Lonchaea alexanderi Brèthes, 1922
- Lonchaea andina (Bigot, 1885)
- Lonchaea andrei Kovalev, 1976
- Lonchaea angelina MacGowan, 2014
- Lonchaea angustitarsis Malloch, 1920
- Lonchaea apricaria McAlpine, 1964
- Lonchaea arrogata McAlpine, 1964
- Lonchaea asymmetrica MacGowan, 2005
- Lonchaea atraposa McAlpine, 1964
- Lonchaea atritarsis Malloch, 1923
- Lonchaea atronitens Kovalev, 1973
- Lonchaea auranticornis McAlpine, 1964
- Lonchaea avida McAlpine, 1961
- Lonchaea baechlii Macgowan, 2016
- Lonchaea baekje MacGowan, 2016
- Lonchaea baliola McAlpine, 1964
- Lonchaea ballerina McAlpine & Monroe, 1968
- Lonchaea belua McAlpine, 1964
- Lonchaea biarmata MacGowan, 2007
- Lonchaea bicercosa MacGowan, 2016
- Lonchaea bicoloricornis Senior-White, 1924
- Lonchaea bispicata Withers & MacGowan, 2015
- Lonchaea brasiliensis Walker, 1853
- Lonchaea britteni Collin, 1953
- Lonchaea bruggeri Morge, 1967
- Lonchaea bukowskii Czerny, 1934
- Lonchaea caerulea Walker, 1849
- Lonchaea caledonica MacGowan & Rotheray, 2000
- Lonchaea carpathica Kovalev, 1974
- Lonchaea caucasica Kovalev, 1974
- Lonchaea chalybea Wiedemann, 1830
- Lonchaea chinchinaia Luna, 1988
- Lonchaea chinensis MacGowan, 2007
- Lonchaea chorea (Fabricius, 1781)
- Lonchaea choreoides Bezzi, 1923
- Lonchaea cilicornis Hennig, 1948
- Lonchaea claripennis (Macquart, 1844)
- Lonchaea collini Hackman, 1956
- Lonchaea coloradensis Malloch, 1923
- Lonchaea comitata McAlpine, 1964
- Lonchaea conicoura McAlpine, 1961
- Lonchaea contigua Collin, 1953
- Lonchaea continentalis Bezzi, 1920
- Lonchaea contraria Czerny, 1934
- Lonchaea cornigera McAlpine, 1964
- Lonchaea corticis Taylor, 1928
- Lonchaea corusca Czerny, 1934
- Lonchaea cristula McAlpine, 1964
- Lonchaea cryptica MacGowan & Ruchin, 2022
- Lonchaea cuneifrons McAlpine, 1964
- Lonchaea curiosa McAlpine, 1964
- Lonchaea curvicaudata Luna, 1988
- Lonchaea cyanconitens Kertész, 1901
- Lonchaea cyaneinitens Kertesz, 1901
- Lonchaea cyaneonitens Kertész, 1901
- Lonchaea dama MacGowan, 2018
- Lonchaea dasyscutella McAlpine, 1964
- Lonchaea defecta McAlpine, 1964
- Lonchaea deleoni McAlpine, 1964
- Lonchaea desantisi Blanchard, 1948
- Lonchaea deutschi Zetterstedt, 1837
- Lonchaea dichaeta McAlpine, 1964
- Lonchaea didymosa McAlpine, 1964
- Lonchaea difficilis Hackman, 1956
- Lonchaea discrepans Walker, 1861
- Lonchaea dunni McAlpine, 1964
- Lonchaea earomyoides McAlpine, 1964
- Lonchaea echinapinna McAlpine, 1964
- Lonchaea ecuatoriana Luna, 1988
- Lonchaea efate MacGowan, 2021
- Lonchaea enderleini McAlpine, 1961
- Lonchaea fangi MacGowan, 2007
- Lonchaea fiji MacGowan, 2014
- Lonchaea flavipedulis McAlpine, 1964
- Lonchaea flavipennis Morge, 1959
- Lonchaea flectaverpa McAlpine, 1964
- Lonchaea flemingi McAlpine, 1964
- Lonchaea formosa MacGowan, 2004
- Lonchaea foxleei McAlpine, 1964
- Lonchaea fraxina MacGowan & Rotheray, 2000
- Lonchaea freyi Czerny, 1934
- Lonchaea fugax Becker, 1895
- Lonchaea fulvicornis Bigot, 1881
- Lonchaea furnissi McAlpine, 1964
- Lonchaea gachilbong MacGowan, 2007
- Lonchaea germanica MacGowan, 2004
- Lonchaea gigantea MacGowan, 2007
- Lonchaea goguryeo MacGowan, 2016
- Lonchaea gorodkovi Kovalev, 1974
- Lonchaea grandiseta MacGowan, 2005
- Lonchaea griseochalybea Hennig, 1948
- Lonchaea hackmani Kovalev, 1981
- Lonchaea haplosetifera McAlpine, 1961
- Lonchaea helvetica MacGowan, 2002
- Lonchaea hennigi McAlpine, 1975
- Lonchaea hesperia McAlpine, 1964
- Lonchaea heterosa McAlpine, 1964
- Lonchaea hilli Malloch, 1928
- Lonchaea hirta Malloch, 1920
- Lonchaea hirticeps Zetterstedt, 1837
- Lonchaea hoppingi McAlpine, 1964
- Lonchaea hyalipennis Zetterstedt, 1847
- Lonchaea iberica MacGowan, 2000
- Lonchaea ignicornis McAlpine, 1964
- Lonchaea impressifrons Bezzi, 1920
- Lonchaea incisurata (Hennig, 1948)
- Lonchaea indistincta Walker, 1853
- Lonchaea intermedia (Hennig, 1948)
- Lonchaea iona MacGowan, 2001
- Lonchaea ipsiphaga McAlpine, 1964
- Lonchaea iridala McAlpine, 1964
- Lonchaea johnseyi McAlpine, 1964
- Lonchaea kapperti MacGowan, 2020
- Lonchaea ketiosa McAlpine, 1964
- Lonchaea kleynbergi MacGowan, 2018
- Lonchaea korea (MacGowan, 2007)
- Lonchaea krivosheinae Kovalev, 1973
- Lonchaea lambiana Bezzi, 1919
- Lonchaea languida McAlpine, 1964
- Lonchaea lateralis MacGowan, 2016
- Lonchaea laticornis Meigen, 1826
- Lonchaea laxa Collin, 1953
- Lonchaea leucostoma Meigen, 1838
- Lonchaea leviscuta McAlpine, 1964
- Lonchaea limatula Collin, 1953
- Lonchaea linefacies McAlpine, 1964
- Lonchaea lineola McAlpine, 1964
- Lonchaea longicornis Williston, 1896
- Lonchaea longistyla Korytkowski, 1971
- Lonchaea longitarsis MacGowan & Freidberg, 2008
- Lonchaea luctuosa McAlpine, 1964
- Lonchaea luteala McAlpine, 1964
- Lonchaea macrocercosa MacGowan, 2004
- Lonchaea magnicornis Hendel, 1932
- Lonchaea malaysia MacGowan, 2005
- Lonchaea malekula MacGowan, 2021
- Lonchaea mallochi MacGowan & Rotheray, 2000
- Lonchaea mamaevi Kovalev, 1973
- Lonchaea maniola McAlpine, 1964
- Lonchaea marshalli McAlpine, 1975
- Lonchaea martini McAlpine, 1964
- Lonchaea marylandica Malloch, 1923
- Lonchaea mbeya MacGowan, 2018
- Lonchaea mcalpinei Korytkowski, 1971
- Lonchaea mcalpineiana Kovalev, 1974
- Lonchaea megacera Kertész, 1901
- Lonchaea melanesia MacGowan, 2014
- Lonchaea metatarsata Becker, 1919
- Lonchaea micula McAlpine, 1964
- Lonchaea minuta Meijere, 1910
- Lonchaea mongolia MacGowan, 2007
- Lonchaea muhavura MacGowan, 2018
- Lonchaea mussoorie MacGowan, 2007
- Lonchaea nanella McAlpine, 1964
- Lonchaea neatosa McAlpine, 1964
- Lonchaea nebulosa McAlpine & Monroe, 1968
- Lonchaea nexosa McAlpine, 1964
- Lonchaea nigrociliata Malloch, 1920
- Lonchaea nimiseta McAlpine, 1964
- Lonchaea nitens (Bigot, 1885)
- Lonchaea nitidissima Kovalev, 1978
- Lonchaea niveisquama Hennig, 1948
- Lonchaea njombe MacGowan, 2018
- Lonchaea norvegica MacGowan & Gustad, 2022
- Lonchaea nudifemorata Malloch, 1914
- Lonchaea obscuritarsis Collin, 1953
- Lonchaea orbitalis MacGowan, 2005
- Lonchaea orchidearum Townsend, 1895
- Lonchaea oreadis McAlpine, 1964
- Lonchaea orientalis MacGowan, 2013
- Lonchaea orsiseta McAlpine & Monroe, 1968
- Lonchaea orsitesa McAlpine & Monroe, 1968
- Lonchaea palpata Czerny, 1934
- Lonchaea palposa Zetterstedt, 1847
- Lonchaea papaveroi Luna, 1988
- Lonchaea paragonica Malloch, 1933
- Lonchaea patens Collin, 1953
- Lonchaea pentecosti MacGowan, 2021
- Lonchaea peregrina Becker, 1895
- Lonchaea perfidia McAlpine, 1964
- Lonchaea pilifrons Hennig, 1948
- Lonchaea pleuriseta Malloch, 1920
- Lonchaea plumoaristata Luna, 1987
- Lonchaea polita (Say, 1830) (Lance fly)
- Lonchaea polyhamata McAlpine, 1964
- Lonchaea populnea McAlpine, 1964
- Lonchaea postica Collin, 1953
- Lonchaea pseudoaculeata Luna, 1988
- Lonchaea pugionata Meijere, 1910
- Lonchaea pumila Meigen, 1838
- Lonchaea pusillula McAlpine, 1964
- Lonchaea ragnari Hackman, 1956
- Lonchaea reidi McAlpine, 1964
- Lonchaea relaxa McAlpine, 1964
- Lonchaea rossica Kovalev, 1975
- Lonchaea ruficornis Malloch, 1920
- Lonchaea rugipilosa Hennig, 1948
- Lonchaea sabroskyi McAlpine, 1964
- Lonchaea scutellaris (Rondani, 1875)
- Lonchaea seitneri Hendel, 1928
- Lonchaea sequela McAlpine, 1964
- Lonchaea serrata MacGowan & Rotheray, 2000
- Lonchaea setapleura McAlpine, 1964
- Lonchaea setifemora MacGowan, 2009
- Lonchaea sibirica Kovalev, 1975
- Lonchaea silla MacGowan, 2016
- Lonchaea silvula McAlpine, 1964
- Lonchaea simulata McAlpine, 1964
- Lonchaea sorocula Hackman, 1956
- Lonchaea sororcula Hackman, 1956
- Lonchaea spicata MacGowan, 2008
- Lonchaea stackelbergi Czerny, 1934
- Lonchaea stelviana MacGowan, 2016
- Lonchaea stigmatica Czerny, 1934
- Lonchaea striatifrons Malloch, 1920
- Lonchaea subhirta McAlpine, 1964
- Lonchaea subneatosa Kovalev, 1974
- Lonchaea sylvatica Beling, 1873
- Lonchaea taigana Kovalev, 1976
- Lonchaea taita MacGowan, 2018
- Lonchaea tanna MacGowan, 2021
- Lonchaea tannuolae Kovalev, 1976
- Lonchaea tanypilosa McAlpine, 1964
- Lonchaea tarantella McAlpine & Monroe, 1968
- Lonchaea tarsata Fallén, 1820
- Lonchaea tenuicornis Kovalev, 1978
- Lonchaea teratosa McAlpine, 1964
- Lonchaea tibialis MacGowan, 2004
- Lonchaea togoensis (Enderlein, 1927)
- Lonchaea trinalis McAlpine, 1964
- Lonchaea triplaris McAlpine, 1964
- Lonchaea trita Curran, 1932
- Lonchaea ultima Collin, 1953
- Lonchaea uniseta Malloch, 1930
- Lonchaea ursina Malloch, 1920
- Lonchaea urubambana Hennig, 1948
- Lonchaea ussuriensis Kovalev, 1973
- Lonchaea vagans Kovalev, 1978
- Lonchaea vanua MacGowan, 2014
- Lonchaea vernicina (Scopoli, 1763)
- Lonchaea vikhrevi MacGowan, 2011
- Lonchaea viriosa McAlpine, 1961
- Lonchaea vockerothi McAlpine, 1964
- Lonchaea watsoni Curran, 1926
- Lonchaea wiedemanni Townsend, 1895
- Lonchaea winnemanae Malloch, 1914
- Lonchaea xylophila Kovalev, 1978
- Lonchaea zamorana Luna, 1987
- Lonchaea zetterstedti Becker, 1902
- Lonchaea zomba MacGowan, 2018
