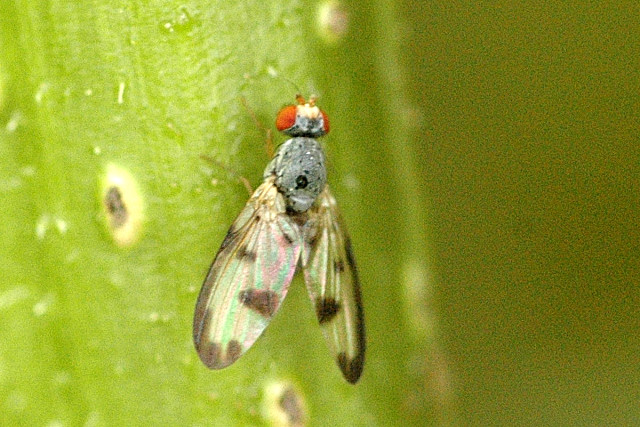
- Palloptera umbellatarum

Scientific classification
- Domain: Eukaryota
- Kingdom: Animalia
- Phylum: Arthropoda
- Class: Insecta
- Order: Diptera
- Section: Schizophora
- Subsection: Acalyptratae
- Superfamily: Tephritoidea
- Family: Pallopteridae; Loew, 1862

Subfamilies
- Eurygnathomyiinae; Pallopterinae

Diversity
- 15 genera, ca. 50+ species

= Pallopteridae =

Family of flies

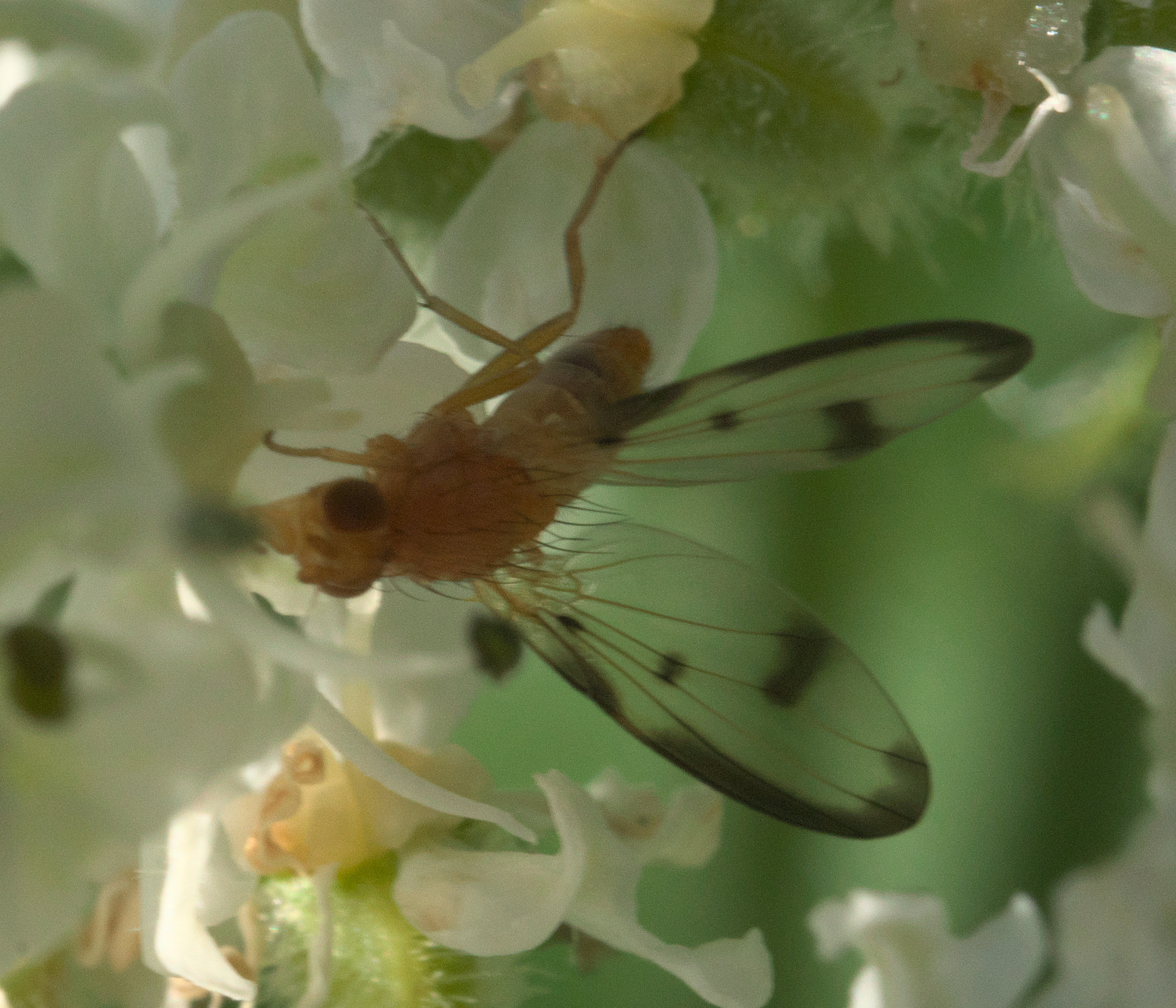
Toxonevra jucunda

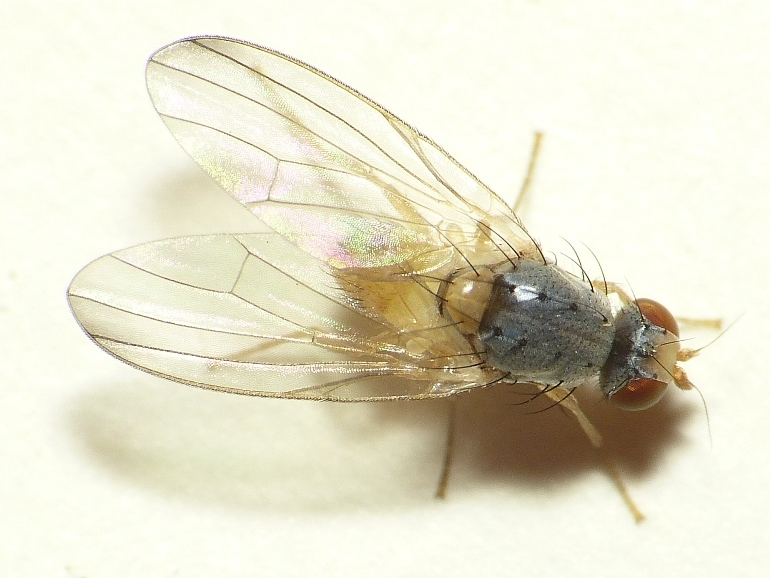
Palloptera ustulata

Pallopteridae is a family of flies. The various species are collectively called flutter-wing flies, trembling-wing, or waving-wing flies, because of the striking vibration of the wings in many species. Over 70 species in about 15 genera are found in the temperate regions of the Northern and Southern Hemispheres.

== Biology ==
Adults have been found on flowers and low-hanging branches in shady habits. Known larvae are phytophagous or carnivorous (some species preying on beetles of the families Cerambycidae and Scolytidae. One species is recorded as preying on larvae of the family Cecidomyiidae. Some have been found in flower buds and stems.

== Description ==
For terms see Morphology of Diptera

They are medium-sized or relatively small flies, they have spots on their wings (dark smoky apical spot in Palloptera ustulata). The wings are considerably longer than the abdomen. The head is semispherical and the postvertical bristles on the head are parallel or divergent. Vibrissae on the head are absent. The arista is bare or has a short pubescence. The mesonotom has four to six pairs of dorso-central bristles. Tibiae without subapical bristles. The costa is interrupted near the end of the subcosta. The subcosta reaches the costa. The subcosta is complete and well separated from vein 1. The cross vein closing the anal cell is usually convex and the angle the cross vein closing anal cell meets vein 6 at more than 90°. See

== Genera ==
These 14 genera belong to the family Pallopteridae:

- Aenigmatomyia
- Eurygnathomyia
- Gorbunia
- Heloparia
- Homaroides
- Morgea
- Neomaorina
- Palloptera Fallén, 1820
- Pallopterites Hennig, 1967
- Pseudopyrgota
- Sciochthis
- Temnosira
- Toxoneura
- Toxonevra Macquart, 1835

== Fossils ==
Five species in four genera are recorded in the fossil record of this family.

== See also ==
=== Identification (literature) ===
- Czerny, L., 1927:in Lindner, E. 53a. Helomyzidae, 53b. Trichoscelidae und 53c. Chiromyidae, in: Die Fliegen der Paläarktischen Region., Stuttgart. Keys genera.
- Morge, G., 1967 Die Lonchaeidae und Pallopteridae Österreichs und der Angrenzenden Gebiete. 2. Teil: Die Pallopteridae. Naturkundliches Jahrbuch der Stadt Linz 13: 141–212.
- Séguy, E., 1934 Diptères: Brachycères. T.II. Muscidae acalypterae, Scatophagidae. Paris: Éditions Faune de France 28.BibliothequeVirtuelleNumerique pdf
- Stackelberg, A.A. Family Pallopteridae in Bei-Bienko, G. Ya, 1988 Keys to the insects of the European Part of the USSR Volume 5 (Diptera) Part 2 English edition. Keys to Palaearctic species but now needs revision.
