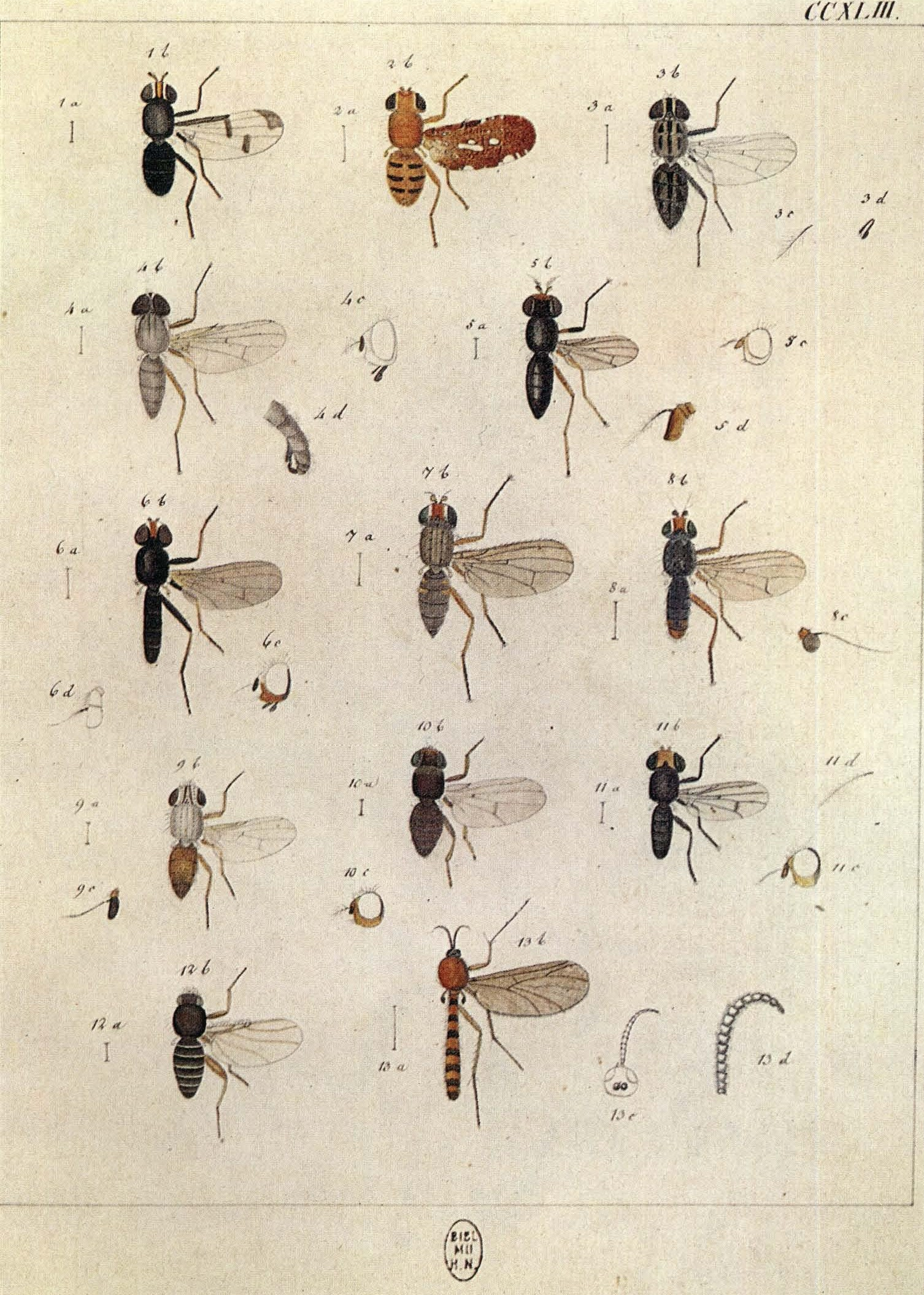
- Plate from Europäischen Zweiflügeligen illustrating Anthomyia peregrina (Figure 9)

Scientific classification
- Kingdom: Animalia
- Phylum: Arthropoda
- Clade: Pancrustacea
- Class: Insecta
- Order: Diptera
- Family: Fanniidae
- Genus: Euryomma
- Species: E. peregrinum

Binomial name
- Euryomma peregrinum (Meigen, 1826)

Synonyms
- Anthomyia peregrina Meigen, 1826; Anthomyia communis Walker, 1853; Homalomya schembrii Rondani, 1866; Coenosia pseudomollicula Frauenfeld, 1867; Anthomyia brevipalpis Thomson, 1869; Homalomyia observanda Rondani, 1877; Hoplogaster dubia Grimshaw, 1901; Cerodiscia zelleri Enderlein, 1936

= Euryomma peregrinum =

Species of fly

Euryomma peregrinum is a small species of flies from the family Fanniidae. It is the type species of the genus Euryomma and was originally described by the German entomologist Johann Wilhelm Meigen, in 1826. Although, he placed it in another genus.

== Biology ==
The larvae feed on decaying vegetable matter and carrion. Distribution is now most tropical and temperate regions worldwide, having been introduced. In Europe it is mainly Mediterranean.

== Description ==
The adult is a small fly of about 3 – 4 mm. With bare arista (as in Fannia), with the first pre-sutural dorsocentral bristle less than half as long as the second. Males have a lower orbital bristle.
