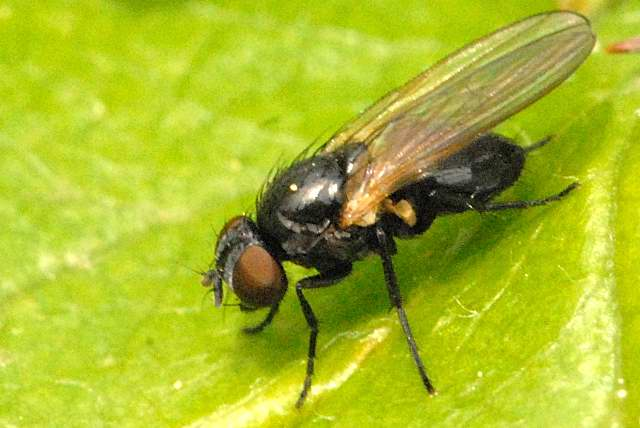

Scientific classification
- Domain: Eukaryota
- Kingdom: Animalia
- Phylum: Arthropoda
- Class: Insecta
- Order: Diptera
- Family: Fanniidae
- Genus: Fannia
- Species: F. sociella

Binomial name
- Fannia sociella (Zetterstedt, 1845)

Synonyms
- Aricia sociella Zetterstedt, 1845

= Fannia sociella =

Species of fly

Fannia sociella is a fly species in the Fanniidae family. This species is smaller and more slender than the house fly, Musca domestica, and is similar in appearance to the lesser house fly, Fannia canicularis. It is found in the Palearctic. For identification see
