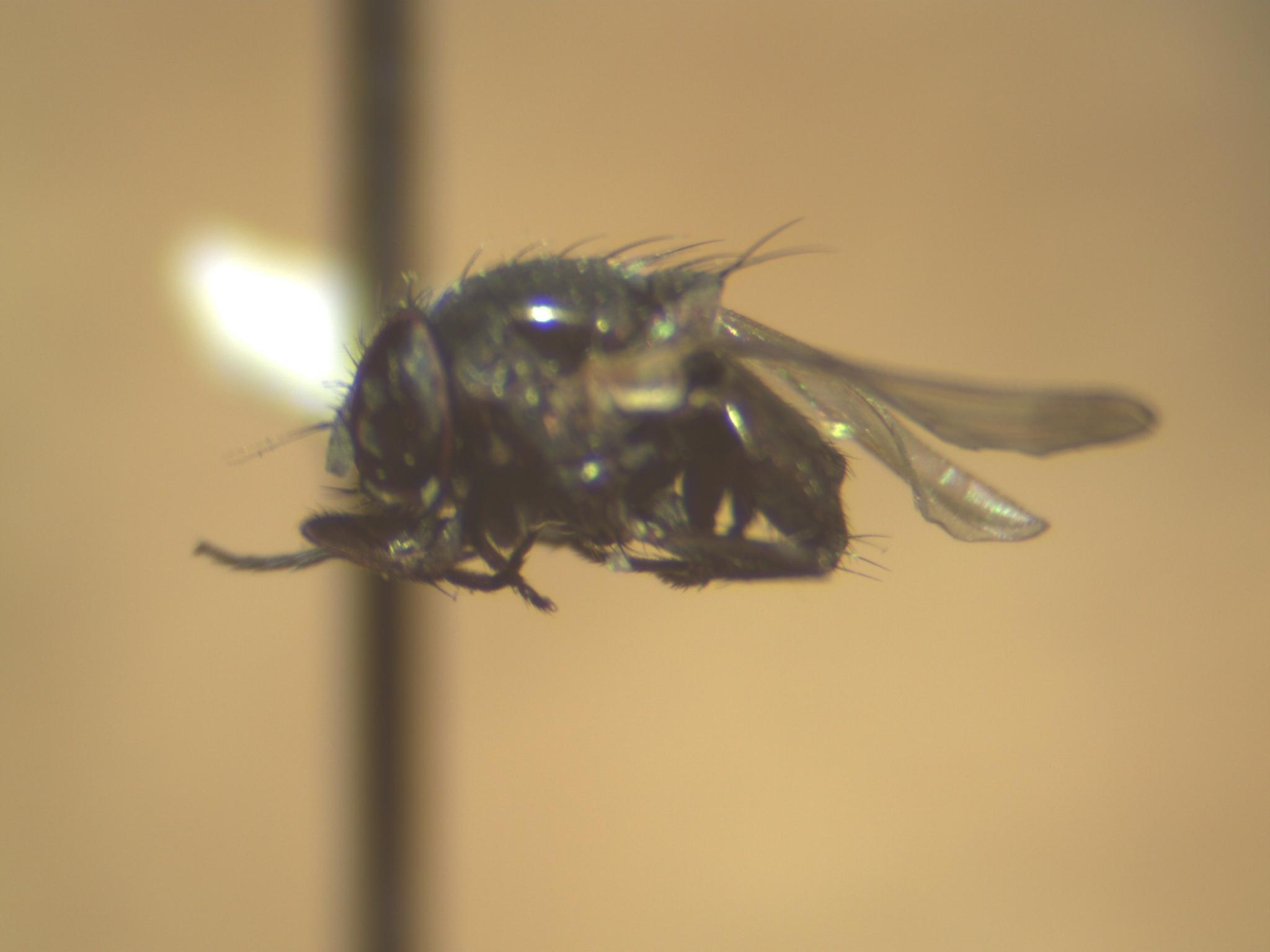

Scientific classification
- Kingdom: Animalia
- Phylum: Arthropoda
- Clade: Pancrustacea
- Class: Insecta
- Order: Diptera
- Family: Fanniidae
- Genus: Fannia
- Species: F. scalaris

Binomial name
- Fannia scalaris (Fabricius, 1794)

Synonyms
- Anthomyza propinqua (Macquart, 1851); Anthomyia elapsa (Walker, 1853); Fannia elapsa (Walker, 1853); Fannia saltatrix (Robineau-Desvoidy, 1830); Fannia steini (Malloch, 1912); Musca scalaris (Fabricius, 1794); Homalomyia bosnica (Strobl, 1898); Steinomyia steini (Malloch, 1912)

= Fannia scalaris =

Species of fly

Fannia scalaris, also known as the latrine fly, is a fly species in the Fanniidae family. This species is smaller and more slender than the house fly, Musca domestica, and is similar in appearance to the lesser house fly, Fannia canicularis. The life cycle of this species can be as long as one month. These flies are globally distributed in urban areas as they are drawn to unsanitary environments. F. scalaris is a major cause of myiasis, the infestation of a body cavity by fly maggots. The adults infest bodies that have decomposed, making the species an important part of forensic entomology. The larvae of this fly have adapted protuberances, or feathered appendages, that allow them to survive in such a moist environment. Entomologists continue to research the effects that F. scalaris may have medically, forensically, and on the environment around them.

== Description ==
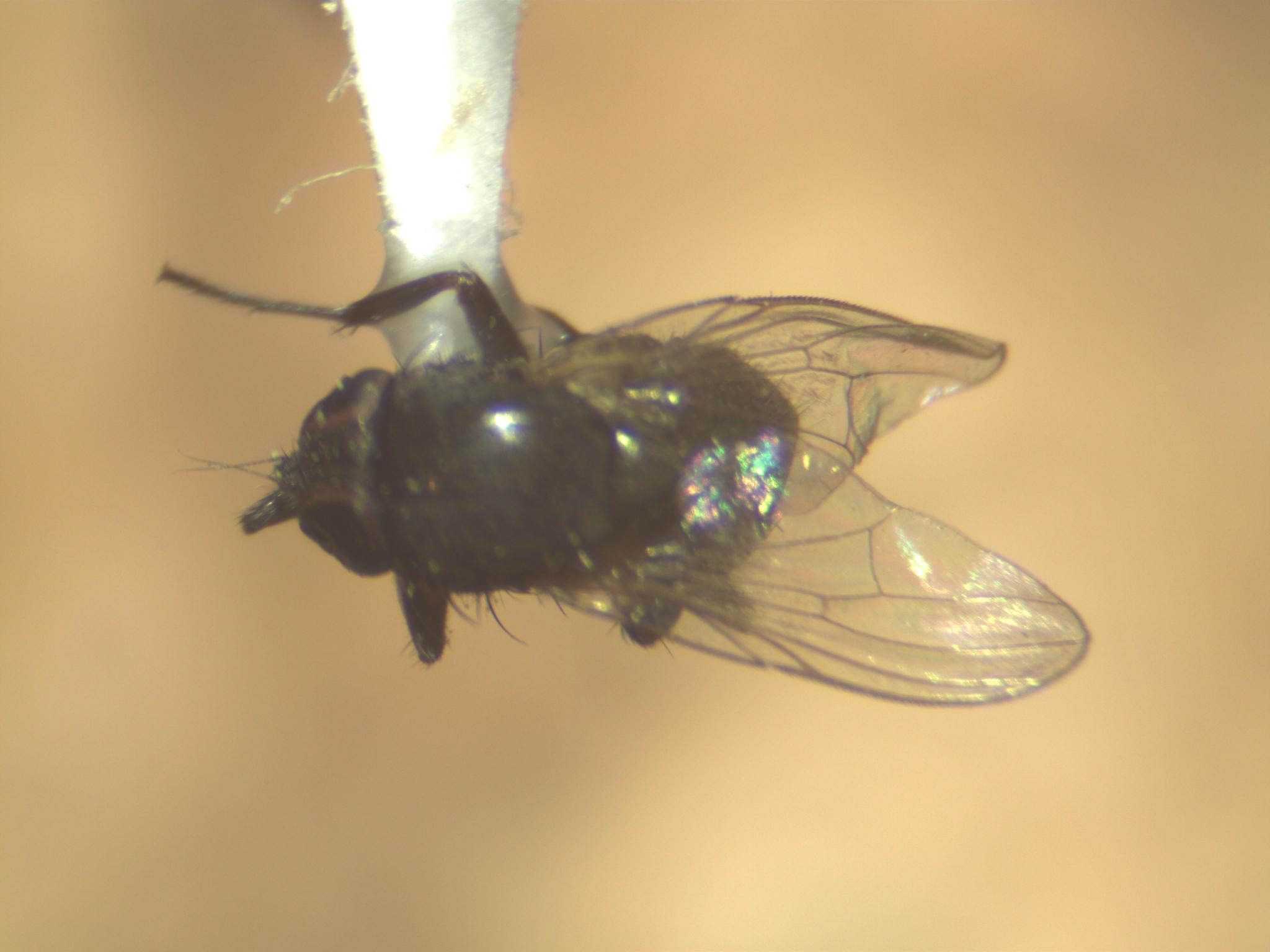
Dorsal view of Fannia scalaris

The larvae of F. scalaris, when full grown, are 6 to 8 mm in length, white or cream colored, and slightly flattened dorsally. They have long tubercles on every segment with the projections of the eighth segment longer than both the seventh and eighth segments put together. The protuberances are feathered due to their preferences for semi-liquid organic matter. They are similar to the hairy maggot blowfly in appearance but smaller in size. During the pupal stage, the puparium is brown in color and the same shape as the larvae.

The adults are black with a silvery-gray coat on the thorax and abdomen. They are 6 to 7 mm long, with clear wings and yellowish calypters. The knob of the haltere is yellow while the stalk is brownish yellow. The dorsal abdomen has a dark median stripe that produces a series of triangular markings with the segmentally arranged transverse bands. The thorax of the adult has three longitudinal stripes. They are darker than F. canicularis. The tibia on the mesothoracic leg has a distinct process, and the coxae have two setae at the apex. The fourth vein on the wing of this species is straight, as compared to it being curved in the house fly. There is a great variance between the sexes of this species, and more is known about the male. For instance; their mid femur does not have blunt spines, the ventral tubercle of the mid tibia is indistinct, and the abdomen has no spots or stripes and is short and broad.

== Life history ==
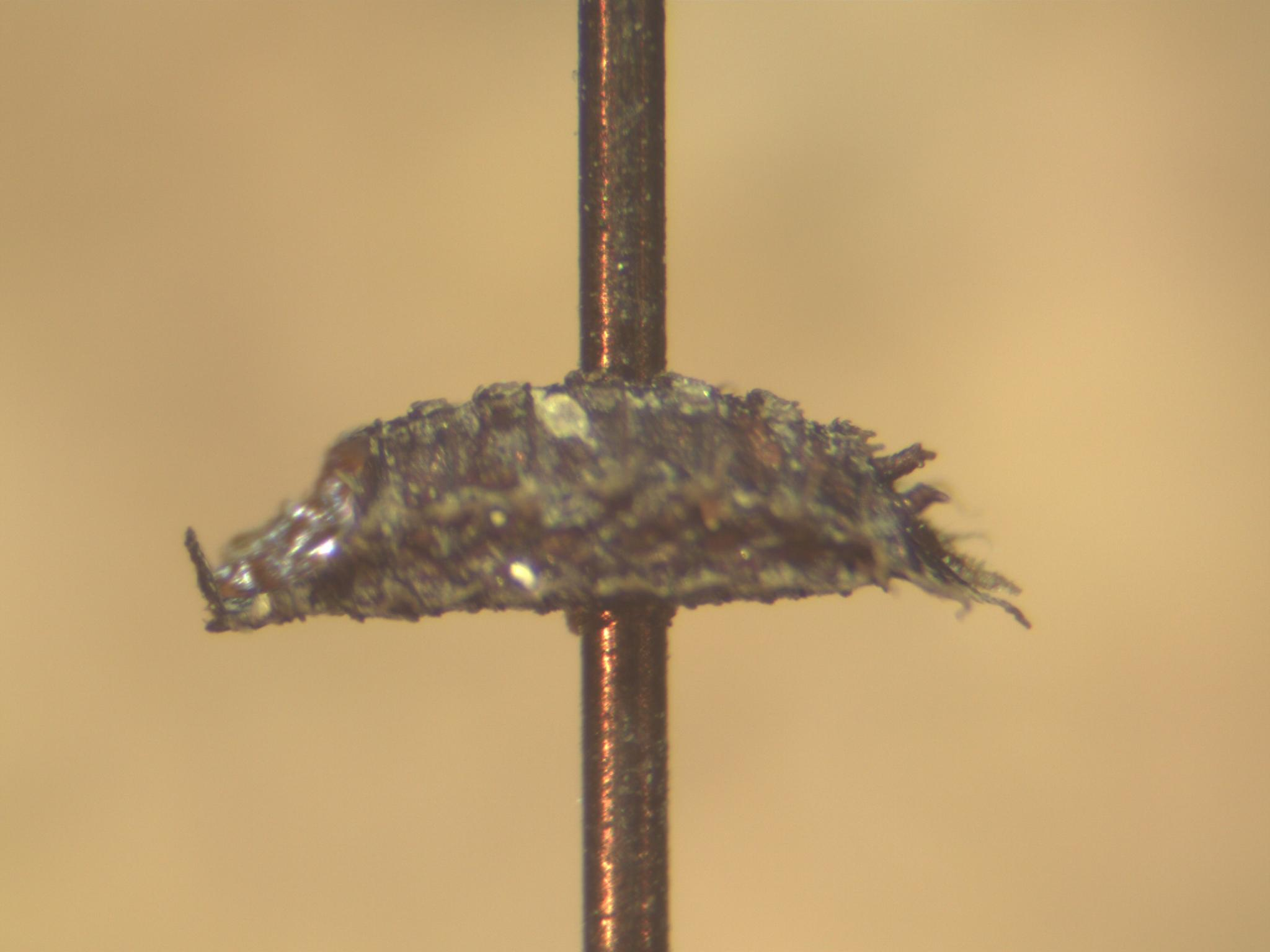
Fannia scalaris pupal casing

The female can lay 100 to 150 eggs in a batch, usually directly on human or animal dung. The common name for this species, the Latrine Fly, comes from the environment it prefers, a very unsanitary, filthy environment, exemplified in the location that they lay their eggs. Their eggs can also be found in decaying vegetable matter, carrion, nests of birds or other insects, or human cadavers. The eggs are laid in such material because they prefer to feed on high nitrogenous material when they hatch. The eggs hatch in as little as 8 hours, but can take up to 48 hours. It takes 5 days for the larvae to pass through all 3 instars, while the pupal stage takes from 7 to 10 days. The life cycle can last from 15 to 30 days depending on the temperature, as the colder the temperature, the longer the lifecycle will last.

== Distribution ==
Fannia scalaris is found worldwide in cosmopolitan areas because of their preferences in developmental environments. This is an outdoor species but can be found indoors in primitive or unsanitary conditions. They are mostly active in the summer months.

== Medical and veterinary importance ==
The main medical concern with this species is that it causes accidental enteric, urinary, auricular, and urogenital myiasis. Myiasis is the infestation of animals or humans, where dipterous fly larvae feed on the host's necrotic or living tissue. This is prevalent in small children and bedridden adults living in unsanitary conditions.

The veterinary concern is the same as the medical. The flies cause the same kind of myiasis in animals as it does in humans. It mainly only affects domesticated companion animals who are paralyzed or helpless.

== Forensic importance ==
Fannia scalaris is usually found on cadavers in exposed gut content or excrement. They are often found on urine-soaked babies’ napkins (diapers) and wet blankets. This species is also found on highly decomposed bodies that are in containers that do not allow drainage, which can form semi-liquid media. They usually arrive at bodies after the blow flies and flesh flies, when the body is at a greater state of decomposition.

== Research ==
The lateral processes on the larvae are believed to aid in floatation and buoyancy, allowing the larvae to breathe in their preferred semi-liquid media.

One study in Malaysia placed out monkey carcasses and recorded which arthropods came to the carrion. They found that once the remains had reached a high degree of decomposition F. scalaris larvae were found around the remains of the colon and fur, areas of high nitrogen concentration.

An article from Canada had two case studies on people being affected by F. scalaris who were not from an underdeveloped country, like the proceeding study in Malaysia. The patients showed similar symptoms, such as myiasis, and had been passing organisms. This illustrates that F. scalaris causes problems for humans globally, not just in underdeveloped regions, although it may be more prevalent in under developed areas.
