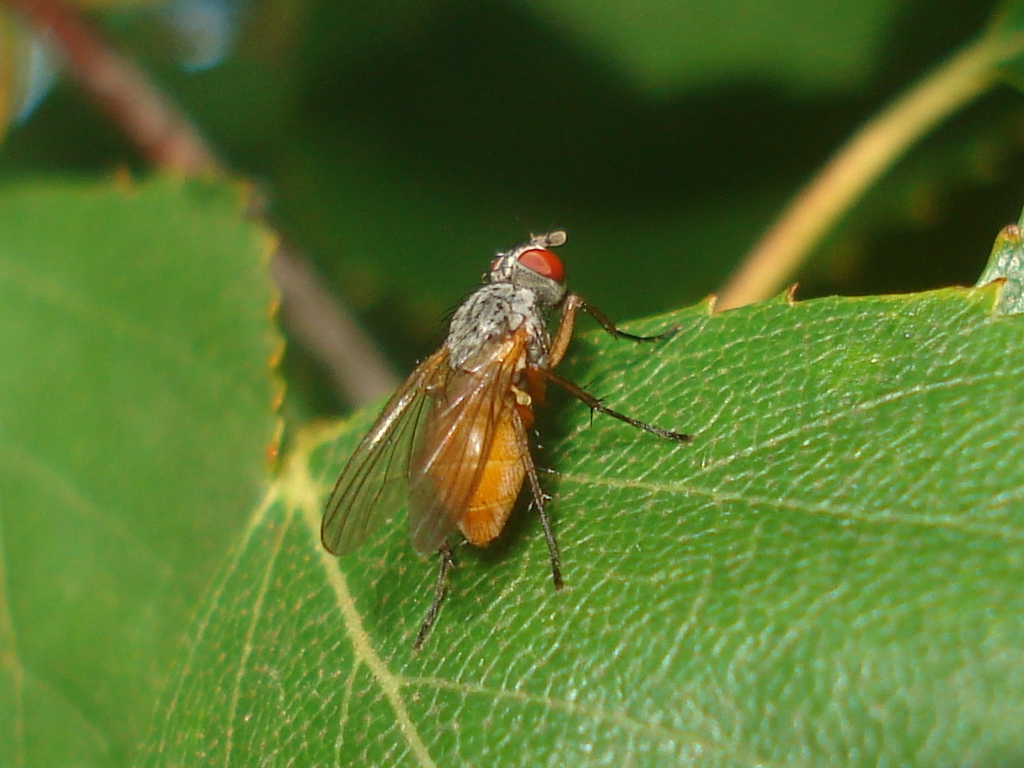

Scientific classification
- Domain: Eukaryota
- Kingdom: Animalia
- Phylum: Arthropoda
- Class: Insecta
- Order: Diptera
- Family: Fanniidae
- Genus: Fannia
- Species: F. ornata

Binomial name
- Fannia ornata (Meigen, 1826)

Synonyms
- Anthomyia ornata Meigen, 1826

= Fannia ornata =

Species of fly

Fannia ornata is a species of fly in the family Fanniidae. This species is smaller and more slender than the house fly, Musca domestica, and is similar in appearance to the lesser house fly, Fannia canicularis.
