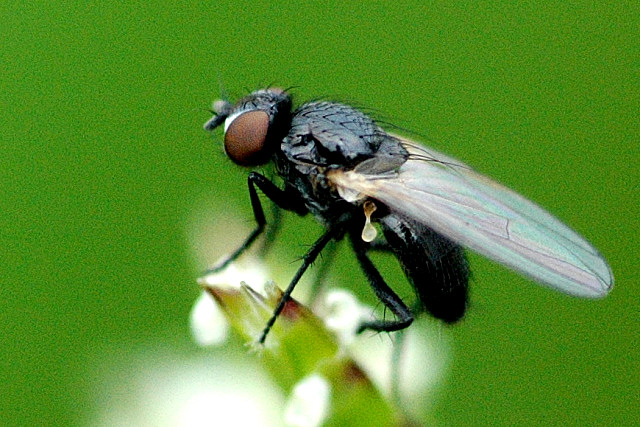

Scientific classification
- Domain: Eukaryota
- Kingdom: Animalia
- Phylum: Arthropoda
- Class: Insecta
- Order: Diptera
- Family: Fanniidae
- Genus: Fannia
- Species: F. lucidula

Binomial name
- Fannia lucidula (Zetterstedt, 1860)

Synonyms
- Aricia lucidula Zetterstedt, 1860; Fannia glaucescens authors; Fannia herniosa (Rondani, 1866); Homalomyia herniosa Rondani, 1866

= Fannia lucidula =

Species of fly

Fannia lucidula is a fly species in the Fanniidae family. This species is smaller and more slender than the house fly, Musca domestica, and is similar in appearance to the lesser house fly, Fannia canicularis.
