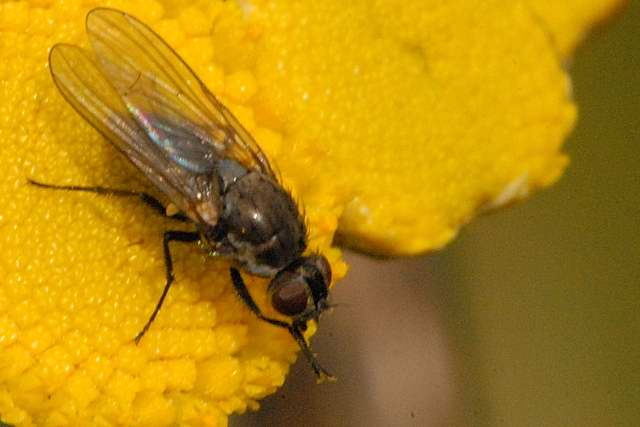
- Fannia lepida

Scientific classification
- Domain: Eukaryota
- Kingdom: Animalia
- Phylum: Arthropoda
- Class: Insecta
- Order: Diptera
- Family: Fanniidae
- Genus: Fannia
- Species: F. lepida

Binomial name
- Fannia lepida (Wiedemann, 1817)

Synonyms
- Anthomyia lepida Wiedemann, 1817; Aricia mutica Zetterstedt, 1845; Fannia mutica (Zetterstedt, 1845); Fannia nigrisquama (Meade, 1887); Homalomyia nigrisquama Meade, 1887

= Fannia lepida =

Species of fly

Fannia lepida is a fly species in the Fanniidae family. This species is smaller and more slender than the house fly, Musca domestica, and is similar in appearance to the lesser house fly, Fannia canicularis. It is found in the Palearctic. For identification see
