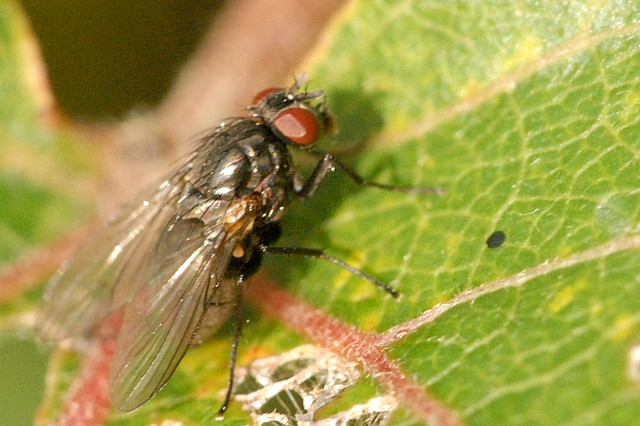

Scientific classification
- Domain: Eukaryota
- Kingdom: Animalia
- Phylum: Arthropoda
- Class: Insecta
- Order: Diptera
- Family: Fanniidae
- Genus: Fannia
- Species: F. armata

Binomial name
- Fannia armata (Meigen, 1826)

Synonyms
- Anthomyia armata Meigen, 1826; Aricia glaucescens Zetterstedt, 1845

= Fannia armata =

Species of fly

Fannia armata is a fly species in the Fanniidae family. This species is smaller and more slender than the house fly, Musca domestica, and is similar in appearance to the lesser house fly, Fannia canicularis. It is found in the Palearctic. For identification see
