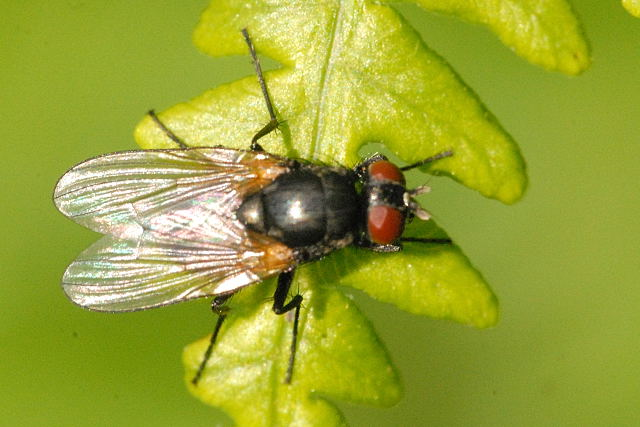

Scientific classification
- Domain: Eukaryota
- Kingdom: Animalia
- Phylum: Arthropoda
- Class: Insecta
- Order: Diptera
- Family: Fanniidae
- Genus: Fannia
- Species: F. carbonaria

Binomial name
- Fannia carbonaria (Meigen, 1826)

Synonyms
- Anthomyia carbonaria Meigen, 1826

= Fannia carbonaria =

Species of fly

Fannia carbonaria is a fly species in the Fanniidae family. This species is smaller and more slender than the house fly, Musca domestica, and is similar in appearance to the lesser house fly, Fannia canicularis.
