= Fannia pusio =

Scientific classification
- Kingdom: Animalia
- Phylum: Arthropoda
- Clade: Pancrustacea
- Class: Insecta
- Order: Diptera
- Family: Fanniidae
- Genus: Fannia
- Species: F. pusio

Binomial name
- Fannia pusio (Wiedemann, 1830)

Synonyms
- Homalomyia femorata Loew, 1861; Mesazelia trichopoda Blanchard, 1942; Anthomyia pusio Wiedemann, 1830

Species of fly

Fannia pusio, known as the chicken dung fly is a fly species of the family Fanniidae including over 260 species of flies worldwide. Originally native to Central and North America, its distribution is now largely global, having been introduced with livestock. As its common name implies it can be very abundant at poultry facilities, resulting in considerable nuisance by their huge numbers. But the larvae will also feed on a wide variety of food, including rotting vegetable matter, excrement, fungi and carrion.
