= Fannia pellucida =

Scientific classification
- Domain: Eukaryota
- Kingdom: Animalia
- Phylum: Arthropoda
- Class: Insecta
- Order: Diptera
- Family: Fanniidae
- Genus: Fannia
- Species: F. pellucida

Binomial name
- Fannia pellucida (Stein, 1898)

Synonyms
- Homalomyia pellucida Stein, 1898

Species of fly

Fannia pellucida is a species of fly in the family Fanniidae.
