= Euryomma arcuata =

Scientific classification
- Domain: Eukaryota
- Kingdom: Animalia
- Phylum: Arthropoda
- Class: Insecta
- Order: Diptera
- Family: Fanniidae
- Genus: Euryomma
- Species: E. arcuata

Binomial name
- Euryomma arcuata Chillcott, 1961

Species of fly

Euryomma arcuata is a species of fly in the genus Euryomma. It was first described by James Gordon Thomas Chillcott in 1961. It occurs in North America. Its occipital bristles are long with a full postoccipital row.
