= F. carbonaria =

F. carbonaria may refer to:

- Fannia carbonaria, a fly species
- Faerberia carbonaria, a fungus species

== See also ==
- Carbonaria (disambiguation)
