= Euryomma =

Euryomma may refer to:

- Euryomma (alga), a red alga genus in the family Solieriaceae
- Euryomma (fly), a fly genus in the family Fanniidae
