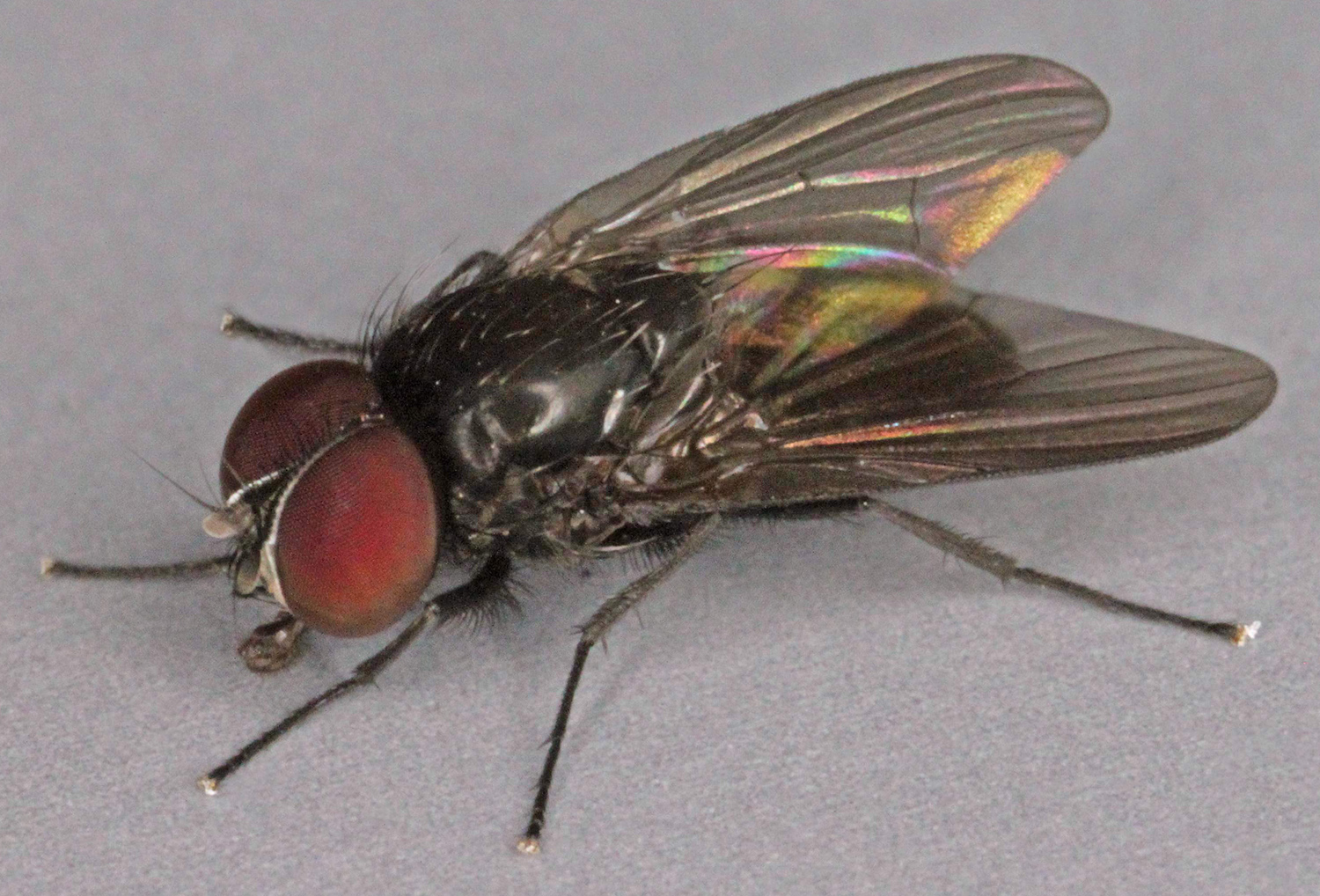
- Fannia rondanii North Wales

Scientific classification
- Kingdom: Animalia
- Phylum: Arthropoda
- Clade: Pancrustacea
- Class: Insecta
- Order: Diptera
- Family: Fanniidae
- Genus: Fannia
- Species: F. rondanii

Binomial name
- Fannia rondanii (Strobl, 1893)

Synonyms
- Homalomyia rondanii Strobl, 1893; Homalomyia carbonaria Rondani, 1871; Fannia crassipes Malloch, 1912

= Fannia rondanii =

Species of fly

Fannia rondanii is a species of fly in the family Fanniidae. It is found in the Palearctic. For identification see
