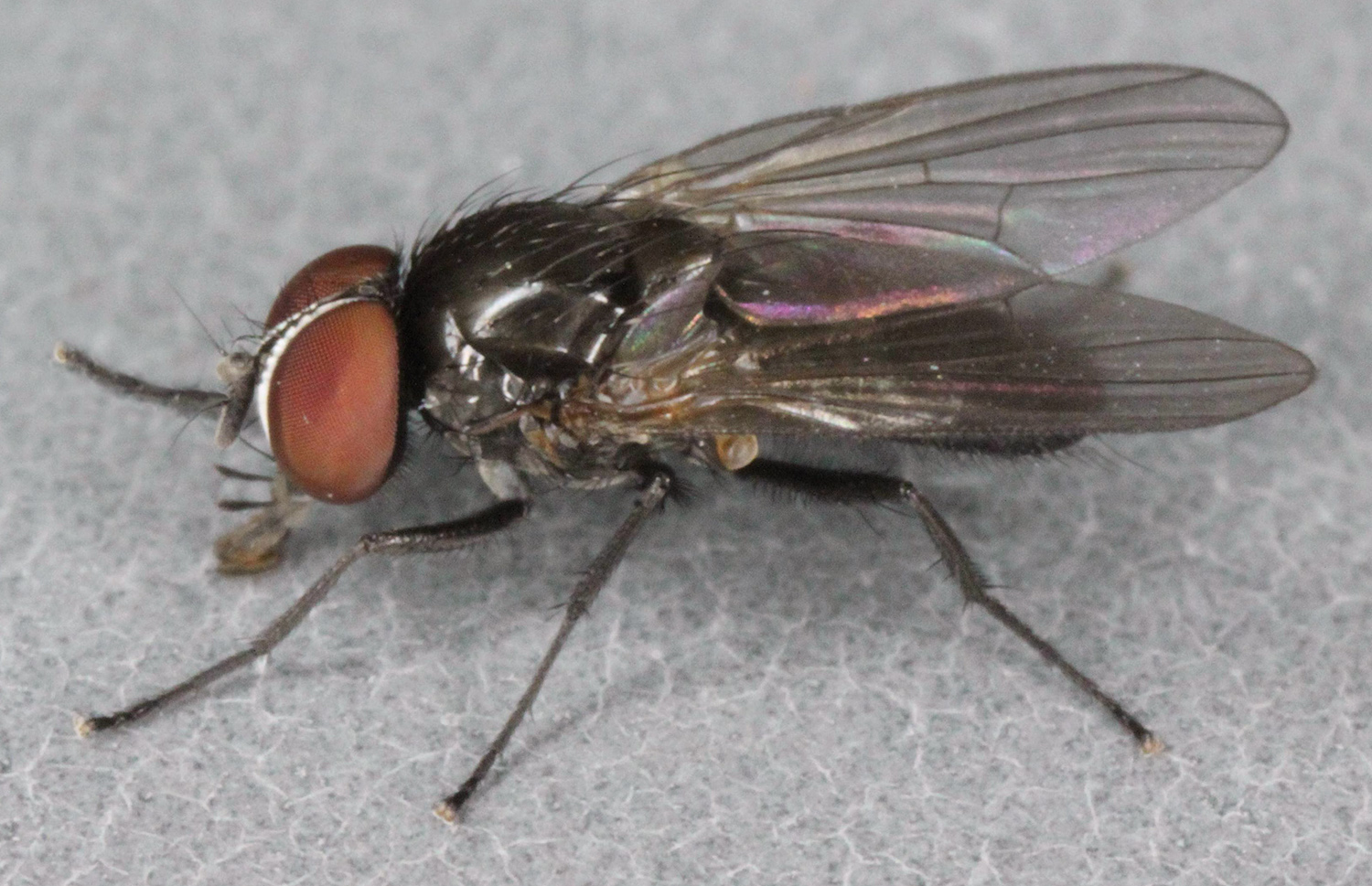
- Fannia serena North Wales

Scientific classification
- Kingdom: Animalia
- Phylum: Arthropoda
- Class: Insecta
- Order: Diptera
- Family: Fanniidae
- Genus: Fannia
- Species: F. serena

Binomial name
- Fannia serena (Fallén, 1825)

= Fannia serena =

Species of fly

Fannia serena is a species of fly in the family Fanniidae. It is found in the Palearctic. For identification see
