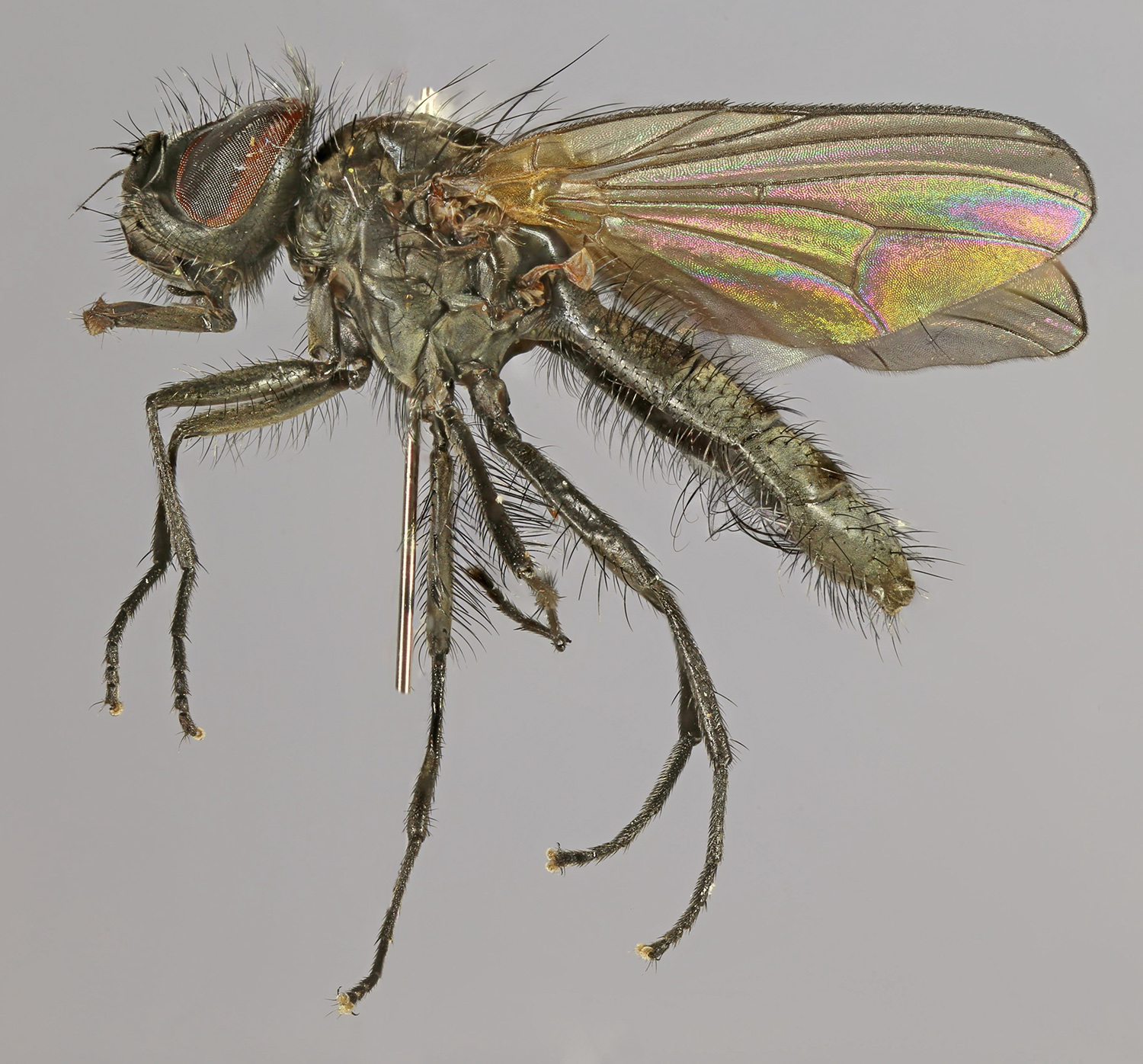
- Fannia mollissima North Wales

Scientific classification
- Kingdom: Animalia
- Phylum: Arthropoda
- Class: Insecta
- Order: Diptera
- Family: Fanniidae
- Genus: Fannia
- Species: F. mollissima

Binomial name
- Fannia mollissima (Haliday, 1840)

Synonyms
- Coelomyia mollissima Haliday, 1840

= Fannia mollissima =

Species of fly

Fannia mollissima is a species of fly in the family Fanniidae. It is found in the Palearctic. For identification see:
