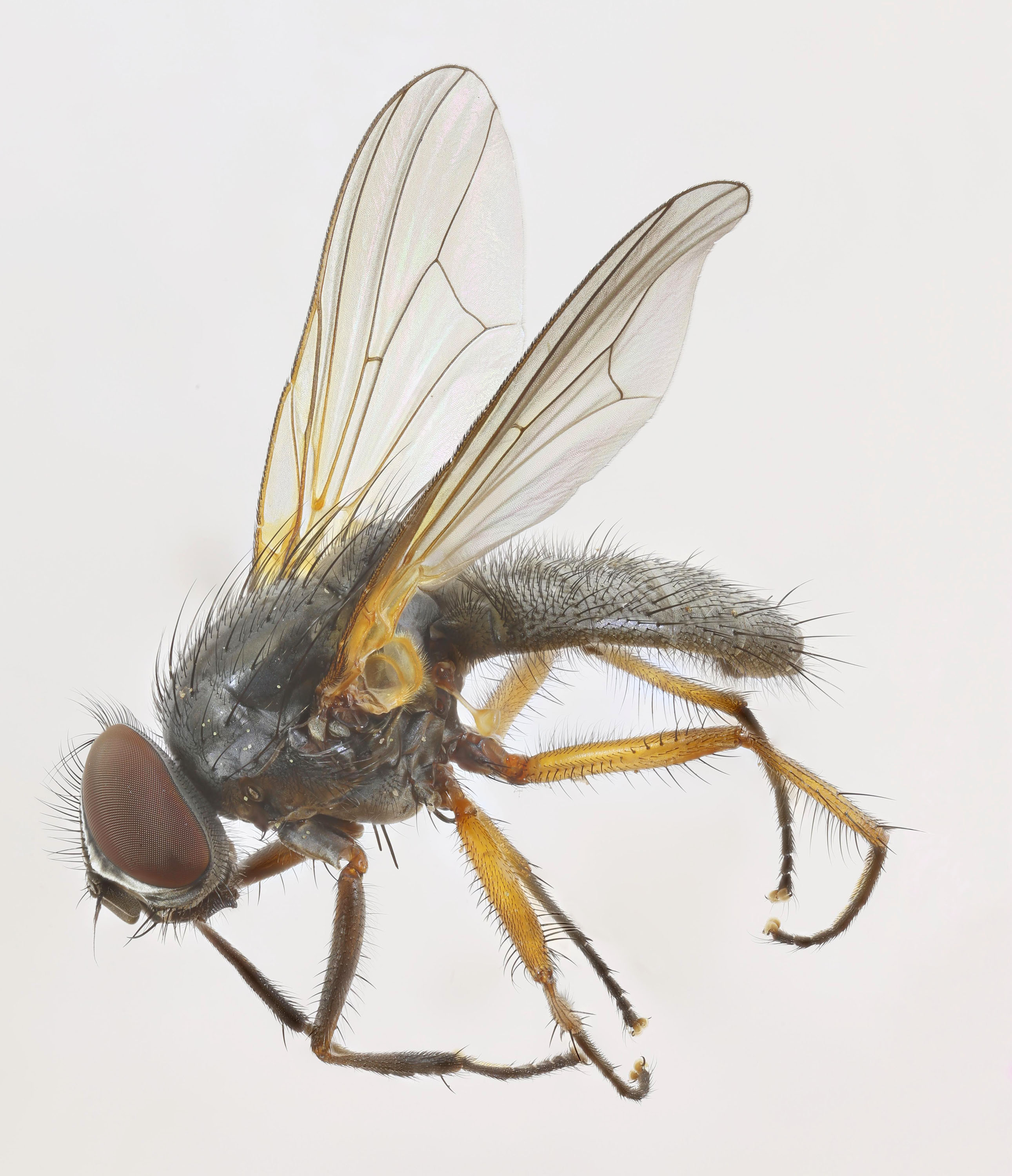
- Adult male

Scientific classification
- Kingdom: Animalia
- Phylum: Arthropoda
- Class: Insecta
- Order: Diptera
- Family: Fanniidae
- Genus: Fannia
- Species: F. lustrator

Binomial name
- Fannia lustrator (Harris, 1780)

Synonyms
- Anthomyia aprica Haliday, 1836; Fannia aprica (Haliday, 1836); Fannia clemens (Harris, 1780); Fannia hamata (Macquart, 1835); Limnophora hamata Macquart, 1835; Musca clemens Harris, 1780; Musca lustrator Harris, 1780

= Fannia lustrator =

Species of fly

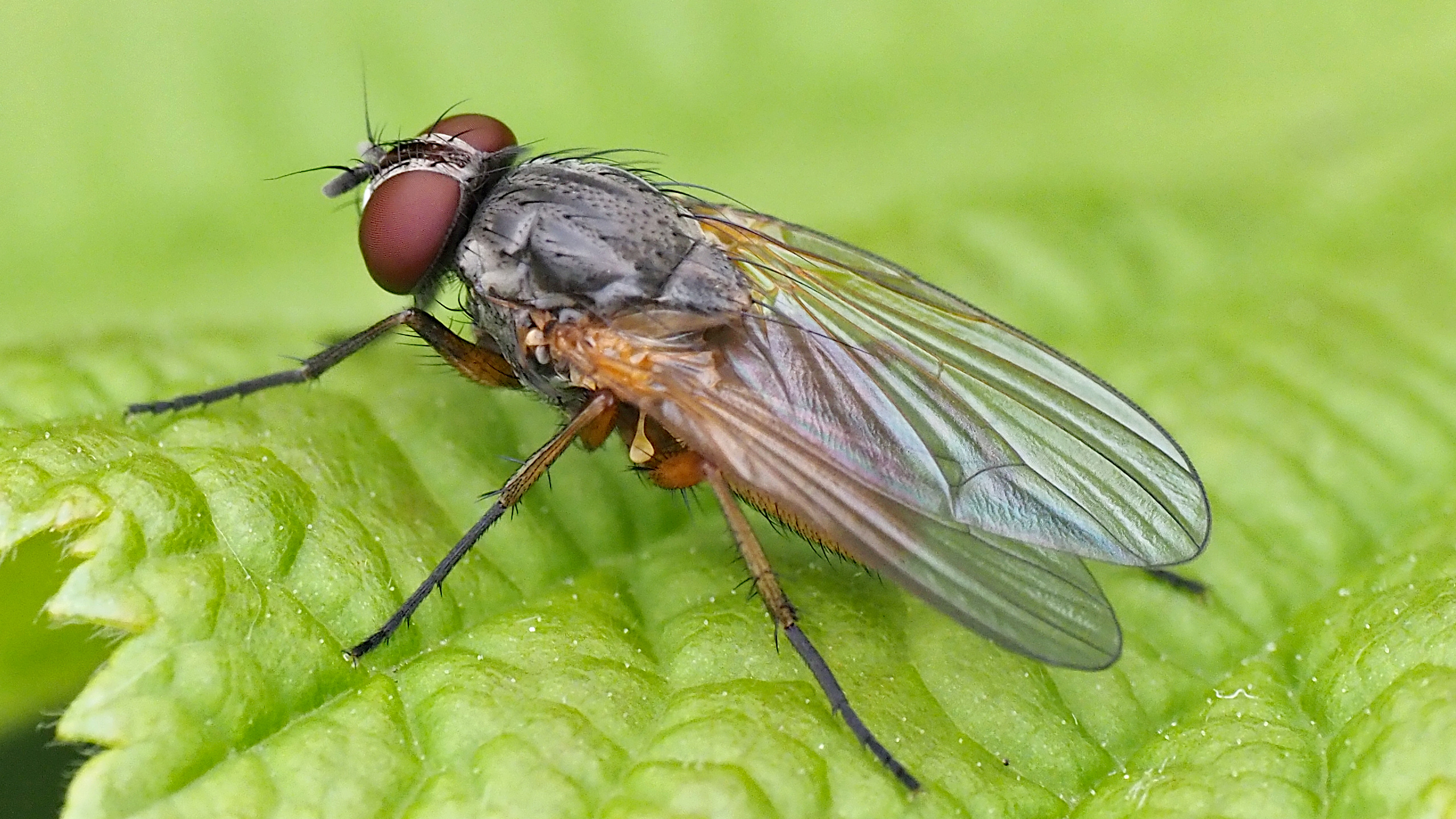
Adult female

Fannia lustrator is a fly species in the Fanniidae family. At 6.5 to 9.0mm long it is conspicuously larger than other Fanniidae and is similar in size to, or slightly larger than, the house fly, Musca domestica. It is found in the Palearctic.
