= Euryomma (fly) =

Scientific classification
- Kingdom: Animalia
- Phylum: Arthropoda
- Clade: Pancrustacea
- Class: Insecta
- Order: Diptera
- Family: Fanniidae
- Genus: Euryomma; Stein, 1899

Type species
- E. peregrinum (Meigen, 1826)

Genus of flies

Euryomma is a genus of flies of the family Fanniidae. The genus was originally proposed by the entomologist Paul Stein in 1899. Although at that time most authorities placed them in the family Muscidae. The distribution of Euryomma is mainly Neotropical, on the whole restricted to the Americas, there is also one Nearctic species, the exception being of the very cosmopolitan E. peregrinum (Meigen, 1826)

== Description ==
With bare arista (as in Fannia), with the first pre-sutural dorsocentral bristle less than half as long as second. Males have a lower orbital bristle.

== Species ==
- Euryomma aburrae Grisales et al., 2012
- Euryomma americanum Chillcott, 1961
- Euryomma annosa Chillcott, 1961
- Euryomma arcuata Chillcott, 1961
- Euryomma campineira Carvalho & Pamplona, 1979
- Euryomma carioca Albuquerque, 1956
- Euryomma chitarera Grisales et al., 2012
- Euryomma cornuatum Grisales et al., 2012
- Euryomma erythrogaster Séguy, 1941
- Euryomma guane Grisales et al., 2012
- Euryomma hispaniense Stein, 1899
- Euryomma longicorne Stein, 1911
- Euryomma muisca Grisales et al., 2012
- Euryomma nigrifemur Stein, 1911
- Euryomma palpingens Wendt & Carvalho, 2007
- Euryomma peregrinum (Meigen, 1826)
- Euryomma rettenmeyeri Chillcott, 1958
- Euryomma rufifrons Stein, 1911
- Euryomma tahami Grisales et al., 2012
- Euryomma uwa Grisales et al., 2012
