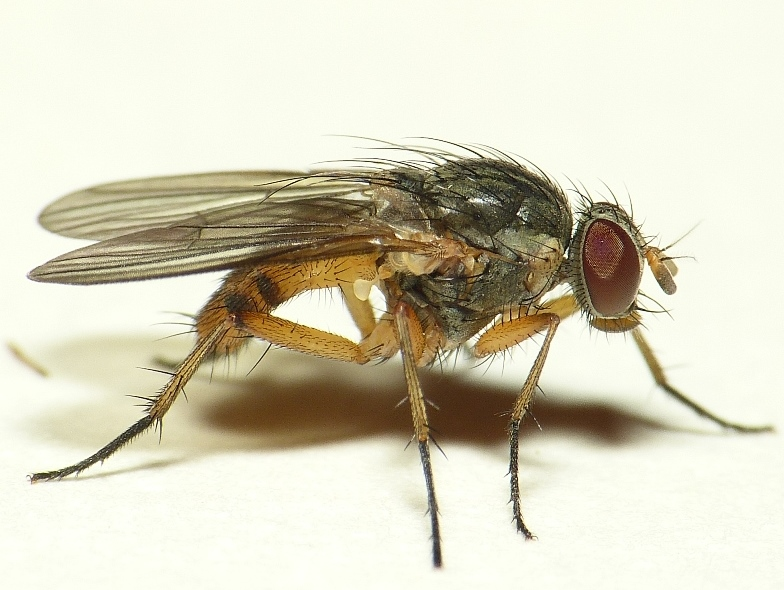
- Piezura graminicola

Scientific classification
- Kingdom: Animalia
- Phylum: Arthropoda
- Clade: Pancrustacea
- Class: Insecta
- Order: Diptera
- Family: Fanniidae
- Genus: Piezura; Rondani, 1866

Synonyms
- Platycoenosia Strobl; Choristomma Stein

= Piezura =

Genus of flies

Piezura is a small genus of small flies of the family Fanniidae. Distribution is mostly restricted to the Holarctic biogeographic region. Two species, P. pardalina and P. graminicola are found in Europe. Unlike the other Fanniidae, Piezura have plumose arista.

== Species ==
- P. graminicola (Zetterstedt, 1846)
- P. nearctica Chillcott, 1961
- P. nigrigenus Nishida, 1975
- P. pardalina Rondani, 1866
- P. pardalina shanxiensis Xue, 1999
