= Australofannia =

Scientific classification
- Kingdom: Animalia
- Phylum: Arthropoda
- Clade: Pancrustacea
- Class: Insecta
- Order: Diptera
- Family: Fanniidae
- Genus: Australofannia; Pont, 1977
- Species: A. spiniclunis

Binomial name
- Australofannia spiniclunis Pont, 1977

Genus of flies

Australofannia is a genus of flies of the family Fanniidae. There is only one known species, Australofannia spiniclunis Pont, 1977, from southeastern Australia. The genus was first described by the English entomologist Adrian C. Pont in 1977.
