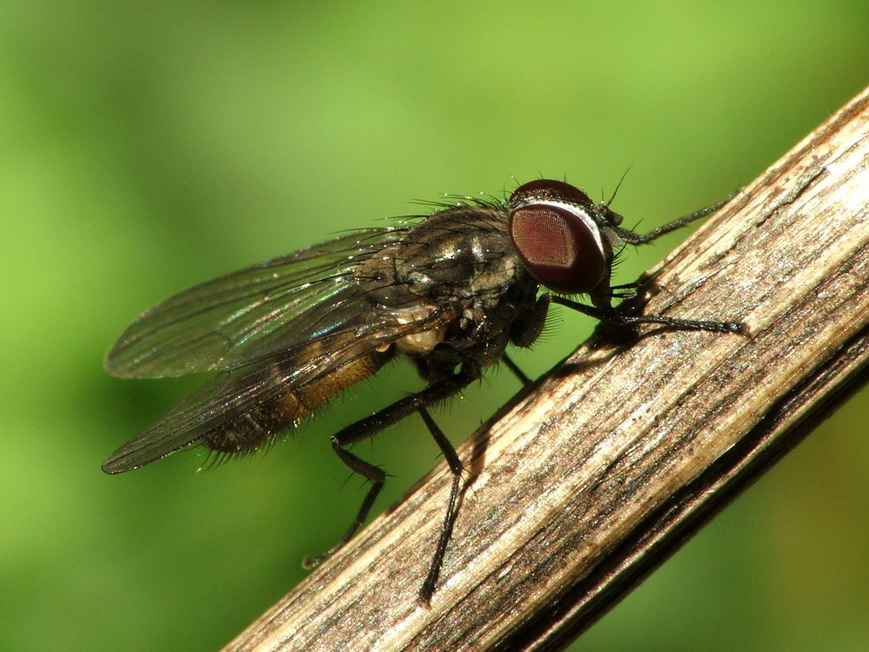
- Lesser house fly, Fannia canicularis

Scientific classification
- Kingdom: Animalia
- Phylum: Arthropoda
- Clade: Pancrustacea
- Class: Insecta
- Order: Diptera
- Family: Fanniidae
- Genus: Fannia; Robineau-Desvoidy, 1830

Type species
- Fannia saltatrix Robineau-Desvoidy, 1830

Synonyms
- Coelomyia Haliday in Westwood, 1840; Homalomyia Bouché, 1834; Steinomyia Malloch, 1912

= Fannia (fly) =

Genus of flies

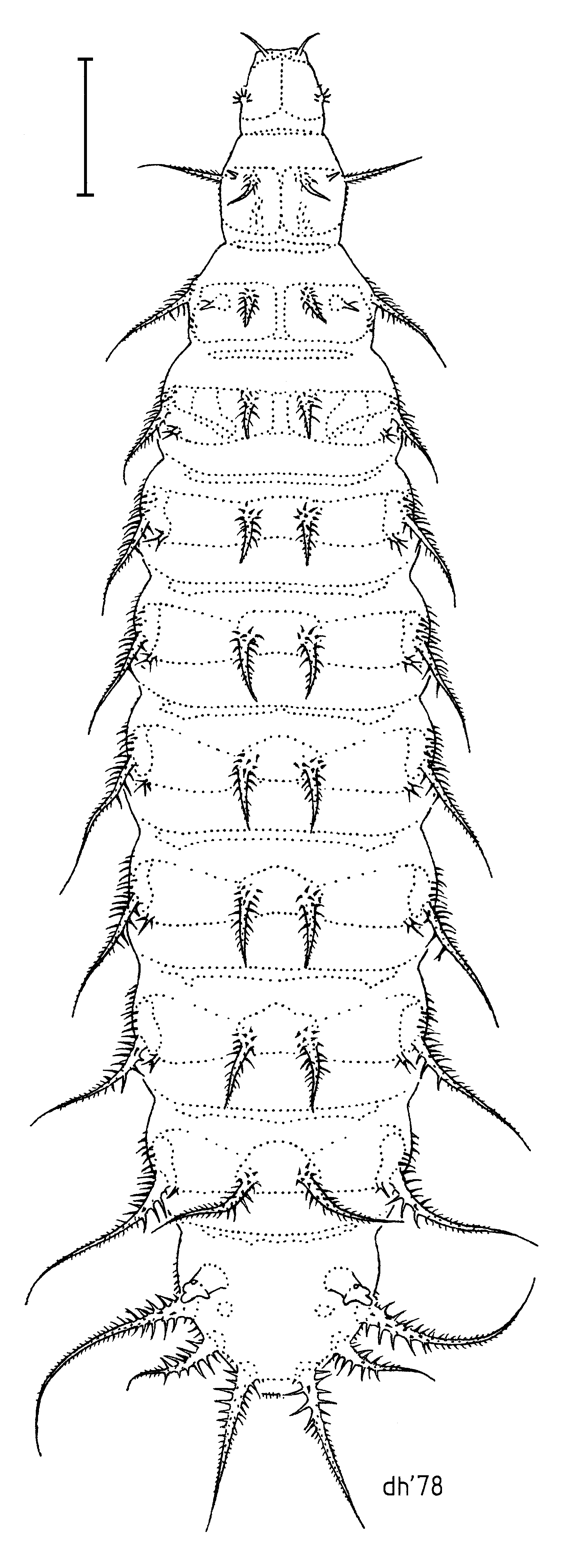
Fannia canicularis, larva

Fannia is a very large genus of approximately 288 species of flies. The genus was originally described by the French entomologist Jean-Baptiste Robineau-Desvoidy in 1830. A number of species were formerly placed in the genus Musca.

== Description ==
The adults have plumose arista, with the first pre-sutural dorsocentral bristle over half as long as the second. Males without a lower orbital bristle.

== Species list ==
- Fannia abnormis (Stein, 1900)
- Fannia abrupta Malloch, 1924
- Fannia admirabilis Albuquerque, 1958
- Fannia aequilineata Ringdahl, 1945
- Fannia aethiops Malloch, 1913
- Fannia alaskensis Chillcott, 1961
- Fannia alpina Pont, 1970
- Fannia albisquama Wang & Zhang, 2008
- Fannia annosa Chillcott, 1961
- Fannia anthracinalis Domínguez & Pont, 2014
- Fannia arcuata Chillcott, 1961
- Fannia arizonensis Chillcott, 1961
- Fannia armata (Meigen, 1826)
- Fannia atra (Stein, 1895)
- Fannia atripes Stein, 1916
- Fannia barbata (Stein, 1892)
- Fannia bigelowi Chillcott, 1961
- Fannia binotata Chillcott, 1961
- Fannia biseta Wang & Zhang, 2008
- Fannia borealis Chillcott, 1961
- Fannia bradorei Chillcott, 1961
- Fannia brevicauda Chillcott, 1961
- Fannia brevipalpis Chillcott, 1961
- Fannia brinae Albuquerque, 1951
- Fannia brooksi Chillcott, 1961
- Fannia canicularis (Linnaeus, 1761)
- Fannia carbonaria (Meigen, 1826)
- Fannia carbonella (Stein, 1895)
- Fannia caucasica (Pont, 2015)
- Fannia ceringogaster Chillcott, 1961
- Fannia ciliatissima Chillcott, 1961
- Fannia cinerea Chillcott, 1961
- Fannia clara Collin, 1939
- Fannia clavata Chillcott, 1961
- Fannia collini d'Assis-Fonseca, 1966
- Fannia columbiana Chillcott, 1961
- Fannia conspicua Malloch, 1913
- Fannia coracina (Loew, 1873)
- Fannia corvina (Verrall, 1892)
- Fannia cothurnata (Loew, 1873)
- Fannia dianensis Wang & Zhang, 2011
- Fannia difficilis (Stein, 1895)
- Fannia doxonglaensis Wang & Zhang, 2008
- Fannia elongata Chillcott, 1961
- Fannia enigmata Chillcott, 1961
- Fannia eremna Chillcott, 1961
- Fannia falcata Chillcott, 1961
- Fannia fasciculata (Loew, 1873)
- Fannia fuscinata Chillcott, 1961
- Fannia fuscitibia Stein, 1920
- Fannia fuscula (Fallén, 1825)
- Fannia garretti Chillcott, 1961
- Fannia genualis (Stein, 1895)
- Fannia gilvitarsis Chillcott, 1961
- Fannia glaucescens (Zetterstedt, 1845)
- Fannia gotlandica Ringdahl, 1926
- Fannia grahami Chillcott, 1961
- Fannia hinei Chillcott, 1961
- Fannia hirticeps (Stein, 1892)
- Fannia hirundinis Ringdahl, 1948
- Fannia hollowayae Domínguez & Pont, 2014
- Fannia immutica Collin, 1939
- Fannia incisurata (Zetterstedt, 1838)
- Fannia indica Chillcott, 1961
- Fannia intermedia Chillcott, 1961
- Fannia ipinensis Chillcott, 1961
- Fannia krimensis Ringdahl, 1934
- Fannia laqueorum Domínguez & Pont, 2014
- Fannia latifrontalis Hennig, 1955
- Fannia latipalpis (Stein, 1892)
- Fannia lepida (Wiedemann, 1817)
- Fannia leucogaster Chillcott, 1961
- Fannia leucosticta (Meigen, 1838)
- Fannia limbata Tiensuu, 1938
- Fannia lineata (Stein, 1895)
- Fannia lucida Chillcott, 1961
- Fannia lucidula (Zetterstedt, 1860)
- Fannia lugubrina (Zetterstedt, 1838)
- Fannia lustrator (Harris, 1780)
- Fannia macalpinei Chillcott, 1961
- Fannia magnicornis Domínguez & Pont, 2014
- Fannia mainling Wang & Zhang, 2008
- Fannia mangerensis Domínguez & Pont, 2014
- Fannia manicata (Meigen, 1826)
- Fannia malagasica Pont, 2006
- Fannia melania (Dufour, 1839)
- Fannia melanura Chillcott, 1961
- Fannia mercurialis Domínguez & Pont, 2014
- Fannia meridionalis Chillcott, 1961
- Fannia metallipennis (Zetterstedt, 1838)
- Fannia micheneri Chillcott, 1961
- Fannia minutipalpis (Stein, 1895)
- Fannia mollissima (Haliday, 1840)
- Fannia monilis (Haliday, 1838)
- Fannia monticola Pont, 1996
- Fannia moseri Chillcott, 1965
- Fannia multiseta Wang & Zhang, 2008
- Fannia multisetosa Chillcott, 1961
- Fannia neomexicana Chillcott, 1961
- Fannia neopolychaeta Chillcott, 1961
- Fannia neotomaria Chillcott, 1961
- Fannia nidica Collin, 1939
- Fannia nigra Malloch, 1910
- Fannia nigribasicosta Wang & Zhang, 2008
- Fannia norvegica Ringdahl, 1934
- Fannia novalis Pont, 1965
- Fannia nudiseta Chillcott, 1961
- Fannia operta Chillcott, 1961
- Fannia oregonensis Chillcott, 1961
- Fannia ornata (Meigen, 1826)
- Fannia pallitibia (Rondani, 1866)
- Fannia parva (Stein, 1895)
- Fannia pauli Pont, 1997
- Fannia pellucida (Stein, 1898)
- Fannia penepretiosa Chillcott, 1961
- Fannia polychaeta (Stein, 1895)
- Fannia postica (Stein, 1895)
- Fannia posticata (Meigen, 1826)
- Fannia presignis Chillcott, 1961
- Fannia prolata Chillcott, 1961
- Fannia pruinosa (Meigen, 1826)
- Fannia pseudonorvegica d'Assis-Fonseca, 1966
- Fannia pseudoscalaris Séguy, 1926
- Fannia pubescens Stein, 1908
- Fannia punctifemoralis Wang & Zhang, 2011
- Fannia pusio (Wiedemann, 1830)
- Fannia rabdionata Karl, 1940
- Fannia ringdahlana Collin, 1939
- Fannia rondanii (Strobl, 1893)
- Fannia robusta Chillcott, 1961
- Fannia scalaris (Fabricius, 1794)
- Fannia scyphocerca Chillcott, 1961
- Fannia sequoiae Chillcott, 1961
- Fannia serena (Fallén, 1825)
- Fannia serrata Chillcott, 1961
- Fannia setifer Chillcott, 1961
- Fannia shinahamae Chillcott, 1961
- Fannia similis (Stein, 1895)
- Fannia sociella (Zetterstedt, 1845)
- Fannia spathiophora Malloch, 1918
- Fannia speciosa (Villeneuve, 1898)
- Fannia stigi Rognes, 1982
- Fannia subatripes d'Assis-Fonseca, 1967
- Fannia subpellucens (Zetterstedt, 1845)
- Fannia subpubescens Collin, 1958
- Fannia subsimilis Ringdahl, 1934
- Fannia tescorum Chillcott, 1961
- Fannia tibetana Wang & Zhang, 2008
- Fannia trigonifera Chillcott, 1961
- Fannia triregun Domínguez & Pont, 2014
- Fannia tuberculata (Zetterstedt, 1849)
- Fannia tundrarum Chillcott, 1961
- Fannia tunisiae Chillcott, 1961
- Fannia umbratica Collin, 1939
- Fannia umbrosa (Stein, 1895)
- Fannia ungulata Chillcott, 1961
- Fannia variabilis Chillcott, 1961
- Fannia verrallii (Stein, 1895)
- Fannia vesparia (Meade, 1891)
- Fannia vespertilionis Ringdahl, 1934

== See also ==
- Domínguez, M.C.; Pont, A.C. (2014). "Fanniidae (Insecta: Diptera)". Fauna of New Zealand: 71. doi:10.7931/J2/FNZ.71.
