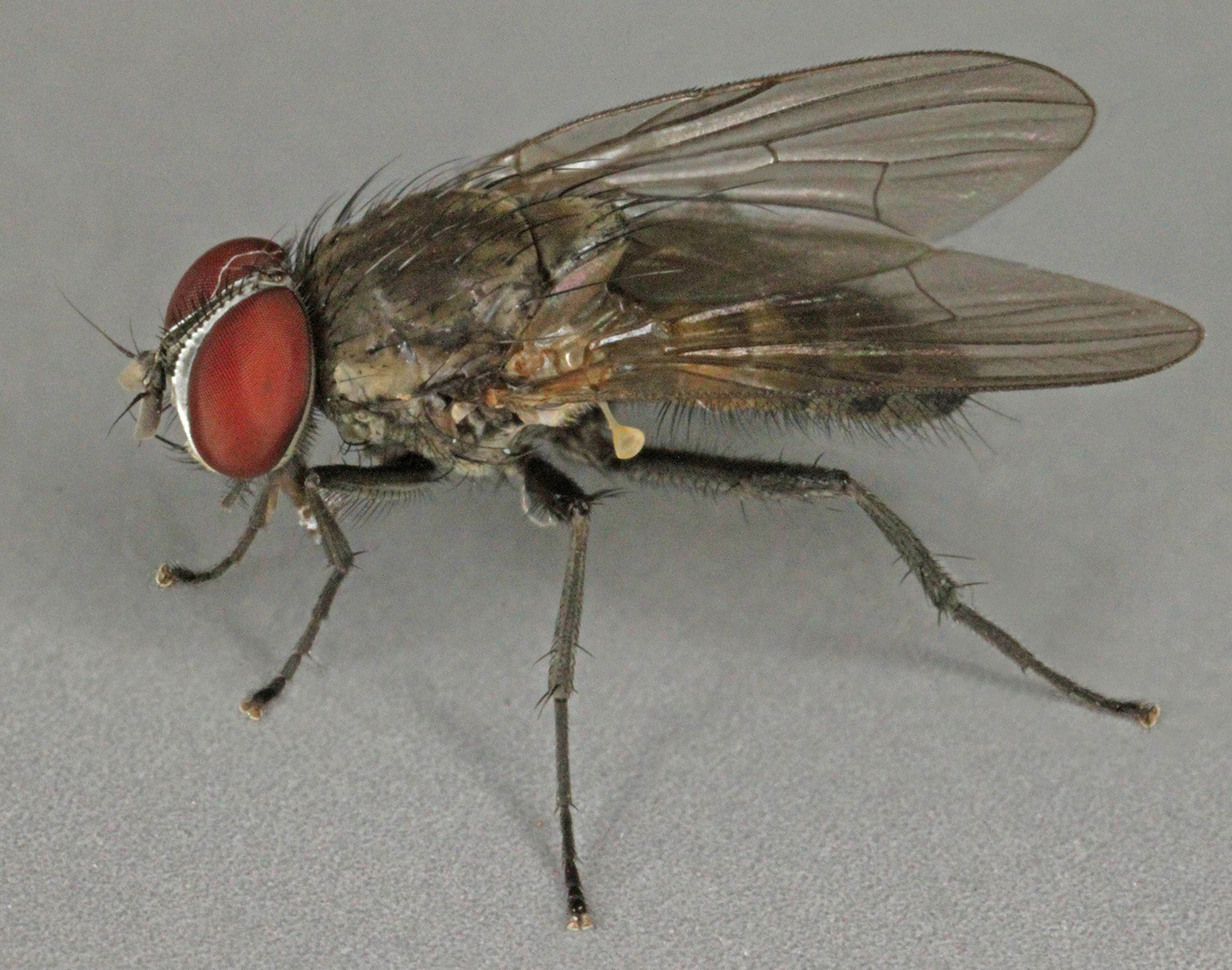
- Fannia canicularis male Trawscoed, North Wales

Scientific classification
- Kingdom: Animalia
- Phylum: Arthropoda
- Clade: Pancrustacea
- Class: Insecta
- Order: Diptera
- Family: Fanniidae
- Genus: Fannia
- Species: F. canicularis

Binomial name
- Fannia canicularis (Linnaeus, 1761)

Synonyms
- Anthomyia tuberosa Ruricola, 1845; Fannia lateralis (Linnaeus, 1758); Fannia socio (Harris, 1780); Fannia sociominor (Harris, 1780); Fannia tuberosa (Ruricola, 1845); Musca canicularis Linnaeus, 1761; Musca lateralis Linnaeus, 1758; Musca socio Harris, 1780; Musca sociominor Harris, 1780

= Lesser house fly =

Species of fly

The lesser house fly (Fannia canicularis), commonly known as little house fly, is a species of fly. It is somewhat smaller (3.5–6 mm (0.14–0.24 in)) than the common housefly and is best known for its habit of entering buildings and flying in jagged patterns in the middle of a room. It is slender, and the median vein in the wing is straight. Larvae feed on all manner of decaying organic matter, including carrion. Though similar in appearance and habits, it is no closer in relation to a house fly than any other fly in order Diptera is.

== Morphology ==
Fannia canicularis is a slim fly reaching a length of from 4 to 6 mm. The white-bordered eyes meet above in the male, a condition described as holoptic. In females, the eyes do not meet. The brown-grey thorax has three black, longitudinal stripes in the males. These are much less distinct in the female. The first two segments of the abdomen are translucently yellow with a dark-brown basal colour. The dark trapezoid marks of the males are hardly recognizable in the females. The halteres are yellowish.

== Development ==
The females lay their eggs in batches of up to 50 and may lay up to 2,000 eggs altogether. The eggs, which are white with a pair of dorsal longitudinal flanges or wings, can float in liquid and semiliquid decaying organic matter, especially poultry, cow and dog feces, kitchen waste such as the end of putrid potatoes or carrots, silage and compost, cheese, bacon, and drying fish. They are commonly found in garbage depots, wheelie bins, garbage trucks, and other places where food waste is stored. The eggs hatch after only two days (24 to 48 hours at 24–27 °C or 75–81 °F) and the larvae require six or more days to reach pupation, which lasts seven or more days, so they usually take about 2–4 wk to develop into adults, depending upon temperature. The cycle repeats in very damp, putrid excrement, liquid manure, etc.

== Behaviour ==
Fannia canicularis is spread worldwide. They have a life expectancy of two to three weeks. In Central Europe, about seven generations can develop per year. They are often found on excrement and on vertebrate animals. Because of their oscillating between excrement and human food, they are considered possible disease carriers. They have also been noted as vectors of Thelazia californiensis. Adult flies in Massachusetts were found year round except for February, though their months of activity vary by location and they may also be absent during hot summers. The lesser housefly comes frequently into buildings and is noticeable by its peculiar, silent flight in the room center, where it circles down-hanging articles, particularly lamps. It changes the flight direction jerkily. This is a patrol flight, in which the males supervise, if necessary, their district and attack intruders. The flight paths in patrolling have a distinct structure of straight runs and abrupt turns. Males adjust themselves to face head down while resting if they have adequate surfaces to turn on and are more likely to rest when there are not many flies around. During the night hours, the flies sit in high places and may leave small excrement or regurgitation marks. Outdoors, trees sheltered from wind and direct sunlight serve the flies for their swarm dances.
