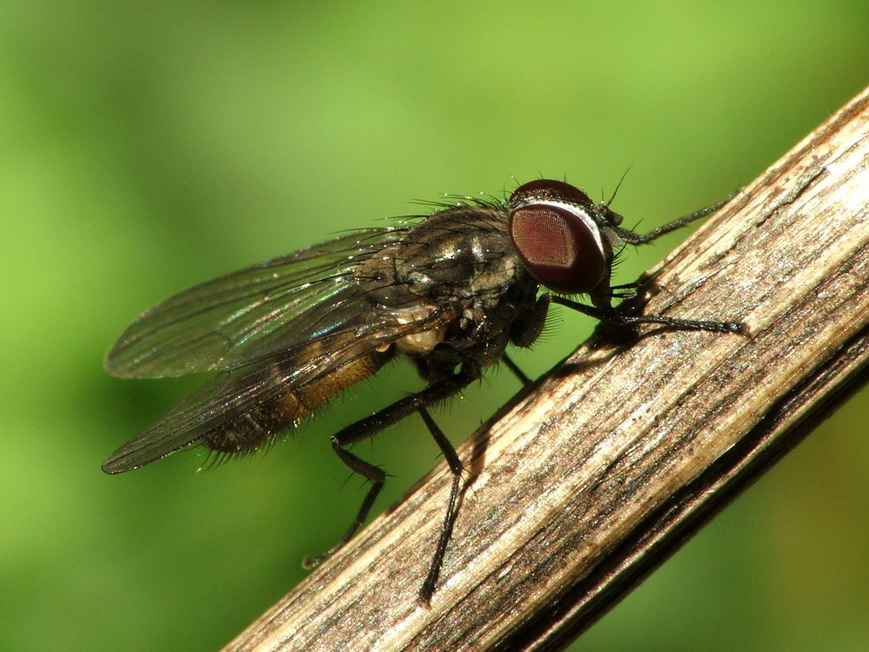
- Fannia canicularis

Scientific classification
- Kingdom: Animalia
- Phylum: Arthropoda
- Clade: Pancrustacea
- Class: Insecta
- Order: Diptera
- Clade: Cyclorrhapha
- Section: Schizophora
- Subsection: Calyptratae
- Superfamily: Muscoidea
- Family: Fanniidae; Schnabl & Dziedzicki, 1911

Genera
- Euryomma Stein, 1899; Fannia Robineau-Desvoidy, 1830; Piezura Rondani, 1866; Australofannia Pont, 1977; Zealandofannia Domínguez & Pont, 2014

= Fanniidae =

Family of flies

The Fanniidae are a small (285 species in five genera) group of true flies largely confined to the Holarctic and temperate Neotropical realms; there are 11 Afrotropical species, 29 Oriental, and 14 Australasian.

Adults are medium-sized to small and usually have mainly dark body and leg colours. Males congregate in characteristic dancing swarms beneath trees; females are more retiring in habit. Larvae are characterised by their flattened bodies with striking lateral protuberances, and live as scavengers in various kinds of decaying organic matter.

The lesser housefly Fannia canicularis is a worldwide synanthropic species.

Fanniidae are indicators useful in forensic entomology.

== Identifying characteristics ==
The Fanniidae were once a subfamily of Muscidae from which they may be distinguished by:

- A (strictly) dorsal bristle is on the hind tibia below the middle and in addition to the dorsal preapical.
- The axillary vein is strongly curved towards the wingtip, so if extended, the axillary and anal veins would meet before reaching the wing tip.
- In males, the middle tibia has an erect pubescence beneath; in females, the frontalia is without crossed bristles, the frontal orbits are broad, and convex towards median line of frons, and two pairs of strong upper orbital bristles are present, with the anterior pair turned outwards. (Note: For a pictorial atlas explaining these terms go to CSIRO: Fly and for images to Diptera.info.)
