= Helina troene =

Scientific classification
- Kingdom: Animalia
- Phylum: Arthropoda
- Class: Insecta
- Order: Diptera
- Family: Muscidae
- Tribe: Phaoniini
- Genus: Helina
- Species: H. troene

Binomial name
- Helina troene (Walker, 1849)

Synonyms
- Anthomyia lysinoe Walker, 1849; Anthomyia troene Walker, 1849; Spilogaster amoeba Stein, 1898; Spilogaster pubiceps Stein, 1898

Species of fly

Helina troene is a species of house flies, etc. in the family Muscidae.
