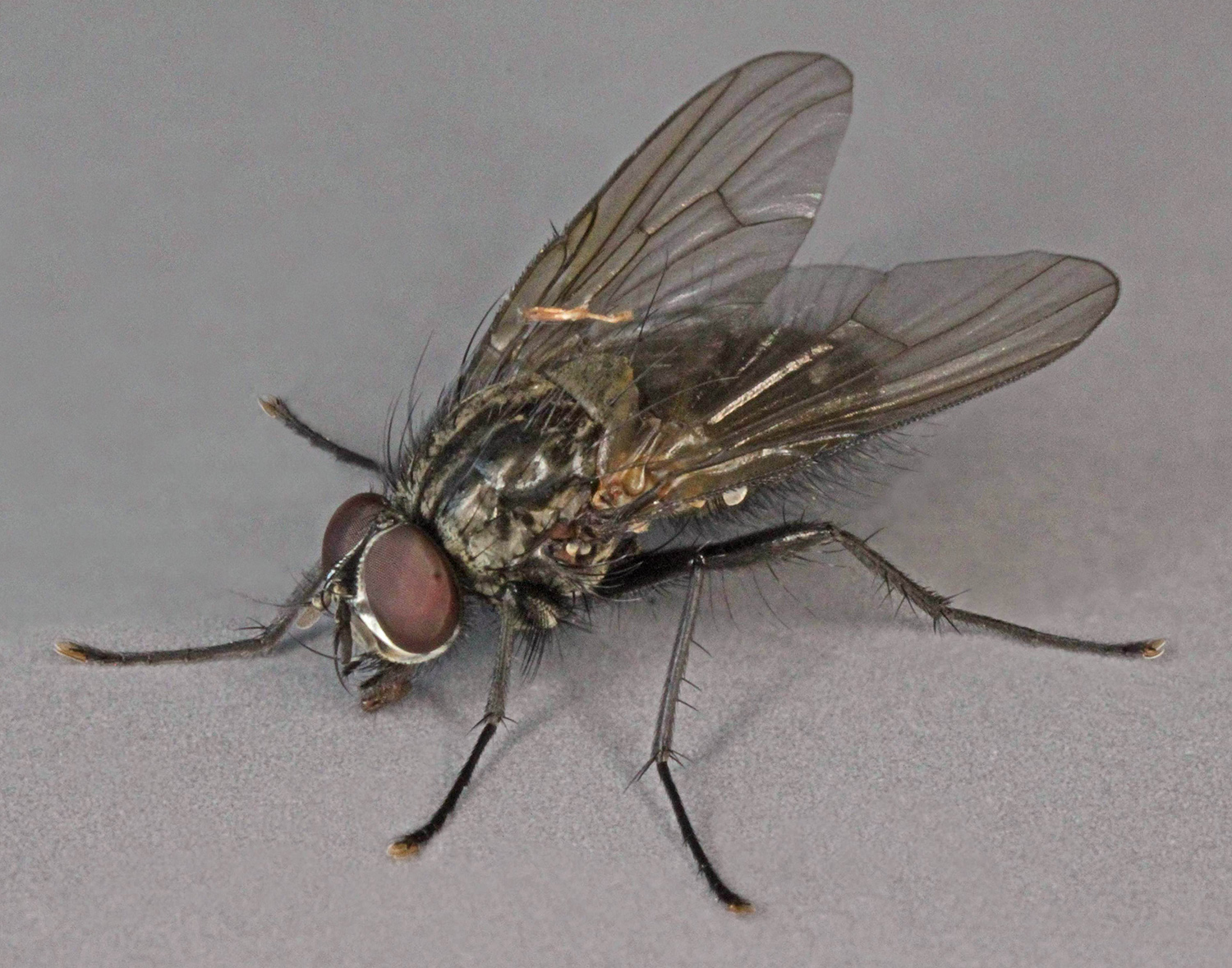
- Helina setiventris North Wales

Scientific classification
- Kingdom: Animalia
- Phylum: Arthropoda
- Clade: Pancrustacea
- Class: Insecta
- Order: Diptera
- Family: Muscidae
- Subfamily: Phaoniinae
- Tribe: Phaoniini
- Genus: Helina
- Species: H. setiventris

Binomial name
- Helina setiventris Ringdahl, 1924

= Helina setiventris =

Species of fly

Helina setiventris is a fly from the family Muscidae. It is found in the Palearctic.
