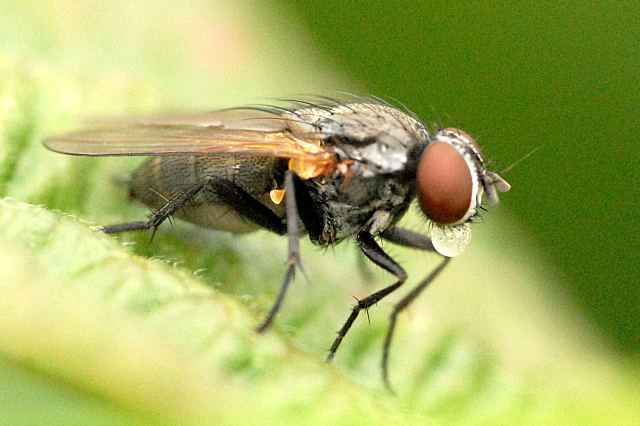

Scientific classification
- Kingdom: Animalia
- Phylum: Arthropoda
- Clade: Pancrustacea
- Class: Insecta
- Order: Diptera
- Family: Muscidae
- Tribe: Phaoniini
- Genus: Helina
- Species: H. obscurata

Binomial name
- Helina obscurata (Meigen, 1826)

Synonyms
- Anthomyia detracta Walker, 1853; Anthomyia obscurata Meigen, 1826; Helina detracta (Walker, 1853)

= Helina obscurata =

Species of fly

Helina obscurata is a fly from the family Muscidae. They are diurnal.
