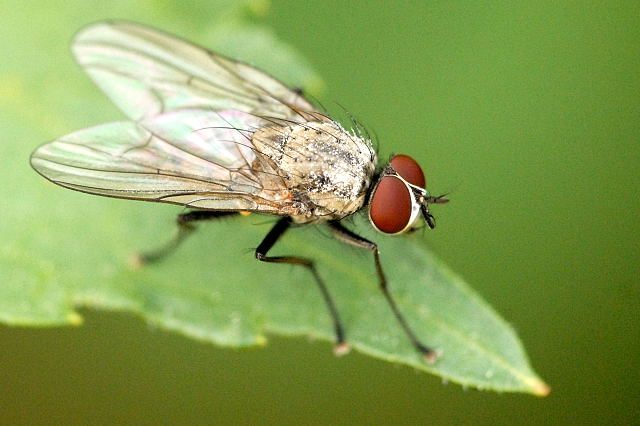
- Helina maculipennis male

Scientific classification
- Kingdom: Animalia
- Phylum: Arthropoda
- Clade: Pancrustacea
- Class: Insecta
- Order: Diptera
- Family: Muscidae
- Tribe: Phaoniini
- Genus: Helina
- Species: H. maculipennis

Binomial name
- Helina maculipennis (Zetterstedt, 1845)

Synonyms
- Aricia maculipennis Zetterstedt, 1845

= Helina maculipennis =

Species of fly

Helina maculipennis is a long fly from the family Muscidae.
