= Helina baoshanensis =

Scientific classification
- Kingdom: Animalia
- Phylum: Arthropoda
- Clade: Pancrustacea
- Class: Insecta
- Order: Diptera
- Family: Muscidae
- Subfamily: Phaoniinae
- Tribe: Phaoniini
- Genus: Helina
- Species: H. baoshanensis

Binomial name
- Helina baoshanensis Xue & Li, 2000

Species of fly

Helina baoshanensis is a species of fly from Helina genus, Muscidae family, described by Xue and Li in 2000.

Is endemic in Yunnan. According to Catalogue of Life, Helina baoshanensis do not have known subspecies.
