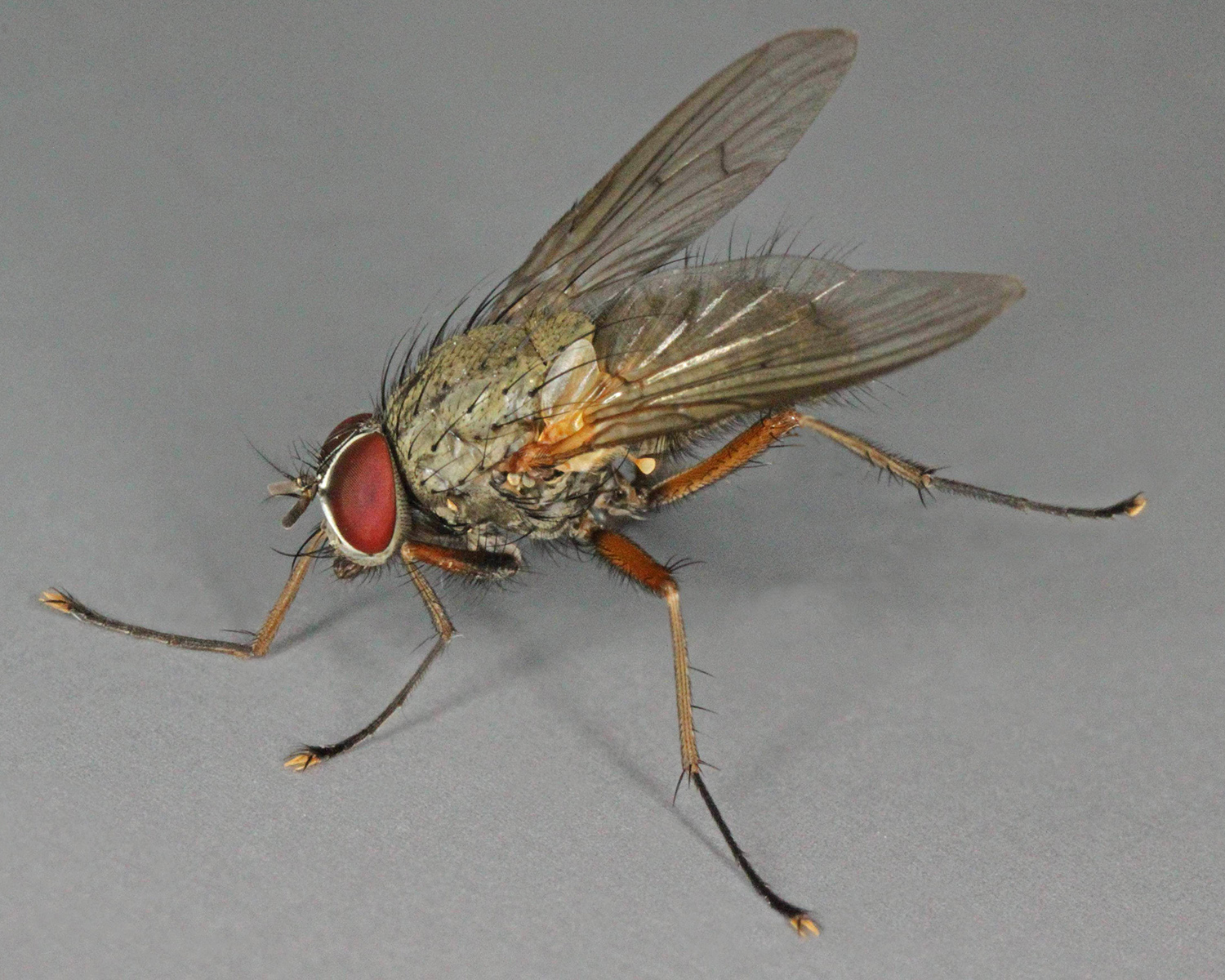
- Helina depuncta North Wales

Scientific classification
- Kingdom: Animalia
- Phylum: Arthropoda
- Clade: Pancrustacea
- Class: Insecta
- Order: Diptera
- Family: Muscidae
- Tribe: Phaoniini
- Genus: Helina
- Species: H. depuncta

Binomial name
- Helina depuncta (Fallén, 1825)

Synonyms
- Musca depuncta Fallén, 1825; Anthomyia effecta Walker, 1853

= Helina depuncta =

Species of fly

Helina depuncta is a fly from the family Muscidae. It is found in the Palearctic.
