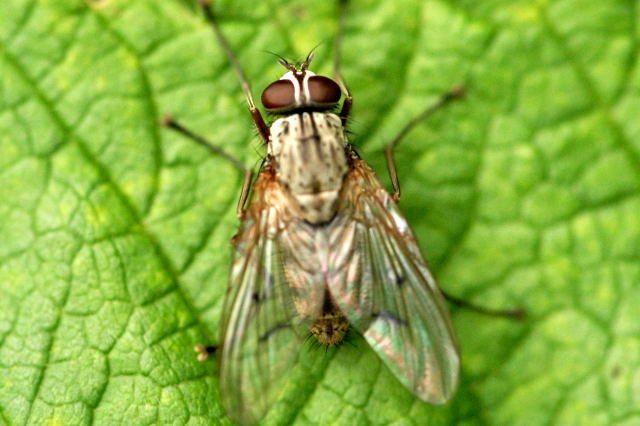
- Helina allotalla female

Scientific classification
- Kingdom: Animalia
- Phylum: Arthropoda
- Clade: Pancrustacea
- Class: Insecta
- Order: Diptera
- Family: Muscidae
- Subfamily: Phaoniinae
- Tribe: Phaoniini
- Genus: Helina
- Species: H. allotalla

Binomial name
- Helina allotalla (Meigen, 1830)

Synonyms
- Anthomyia allotalla Meigen, 1830

= Helina allotalla =

Species of insect

Helina allotalla is a Palearctic fly from the family Muscidae.

== Description ==
See Morphology of Diptera for terms. The eyes are separated by less than 3 times the width of the third antenna! segment. Prealar bristle well developed, about two-thirds the length of second notopleural bristle. The abdomen has at most indistinct narrow paired spots. Arista. wider than third antennal segment. 6–8 mm.
