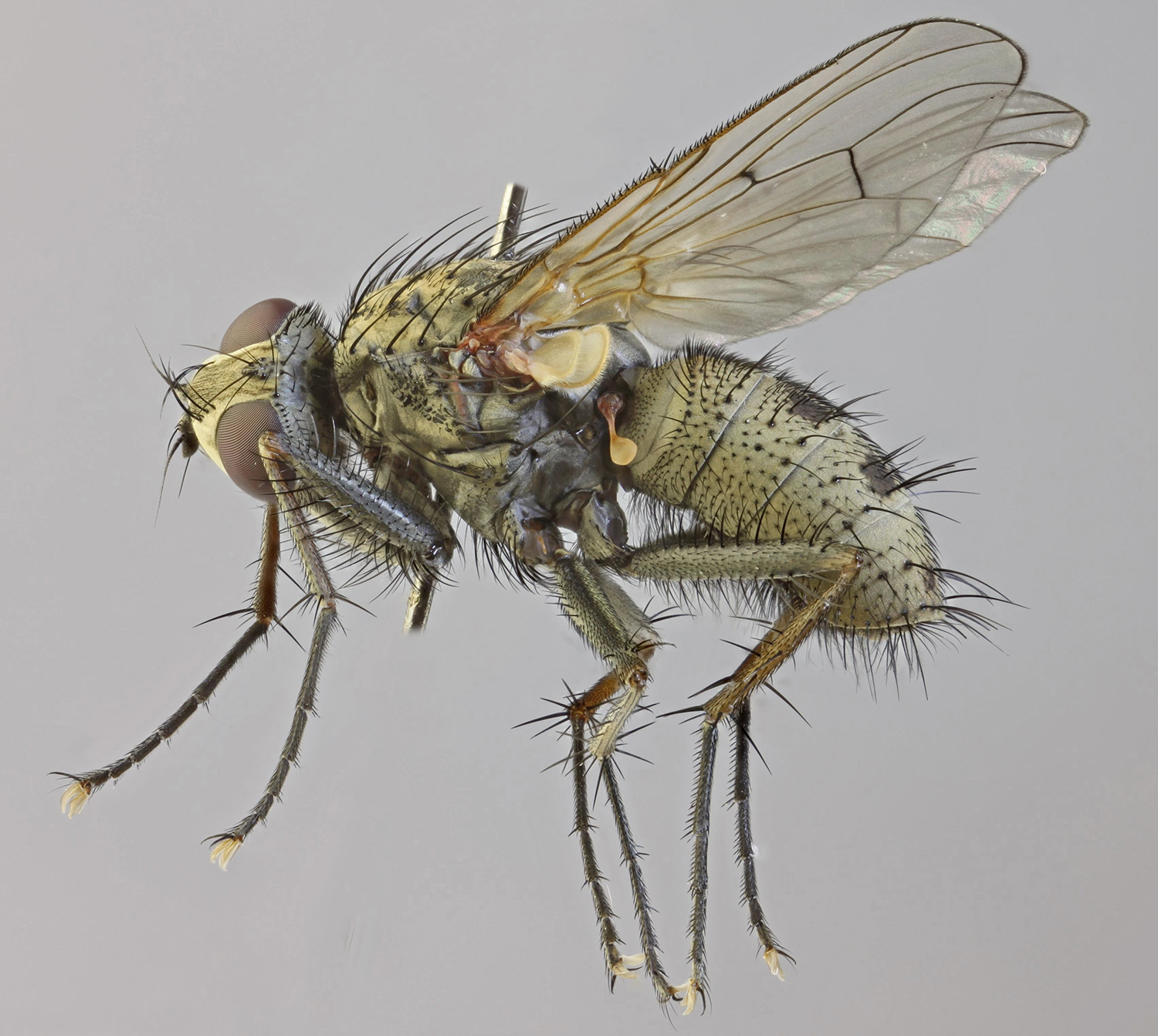
- Helina protuberans North Wales

Scientific classification
- Kingdom: Animalia
- Phylum: Arthropoda
- Clade: Pancrustacea
- Class: Insecta
- Order: Diptera
- Family: Muscidae
- Tribe: Phaoniini
- Genus: Helina
- Species: H. protuberans

Binomial name
- Helina protuberans (Zetterstedt, 1845)

= Helina protuberans =

Species of fly

Helina protuberans is a fly from the family Muscidae. It is found in the Palearctic.
