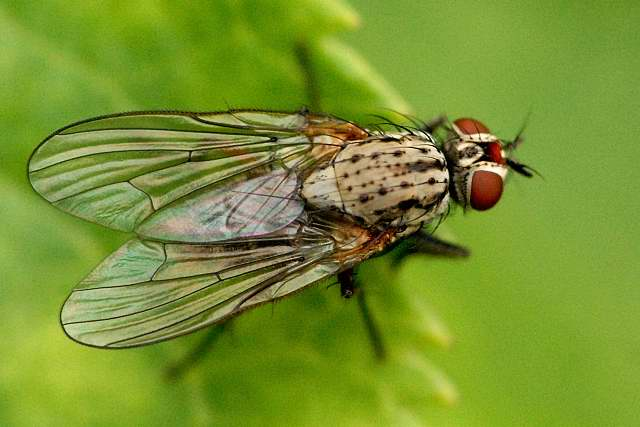
- Helina trivittata

Scientific classification
- Kingdom: Animalia
- Phylum: Arthropoda
- Clade: Pancrustacea
- Class: Insecta
- Order: Diptera
- Family: Muscidae
- Subfamily: Phaoniinae
- Tribe: Phaoniini
- Genus: Helina
- Species: H. trivittata

Binomial name
- Helina trivittata (Zetterstedt, 1860)

Synonyms
- Anthomyza trivittata Zetterstedt, 1860; Helina atripes (Meade, 1889); Spilogaster atripes Meade, 1889

= Helina trivittata =

Species of fly

Helina trivittata is a fly from the family Muscidae.

== Distribution ==
Great Britain (England only), France and Bulgaria to Fennoscandia, European Siberia.
