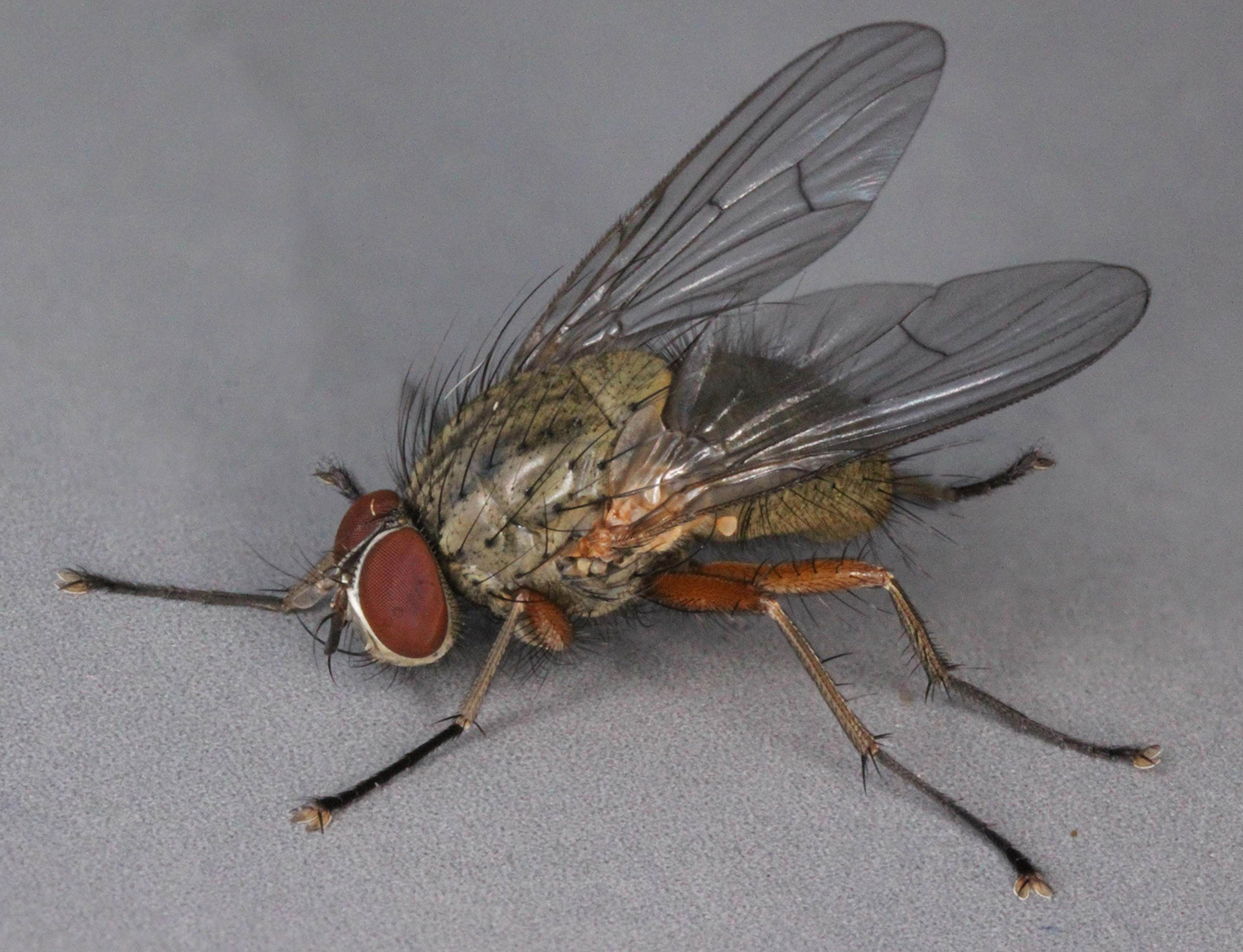
- Helina impuncta North Wales

Scientific classification
- Kingdom: Animalia
- Phylum: Arthropoda
- Clade: Pancrustacea
- Class: Insecta
- Order: Diptera
- Family: Muscidae
- Genus: Helina
- Species: H. impuncta

Binomial name
- Helina impuncta (Fallén, 1825)

= Helina impuncta =

Species of fly

Helina impuncta is a fly in the family Muscidae. It is found in the Palearctic.
