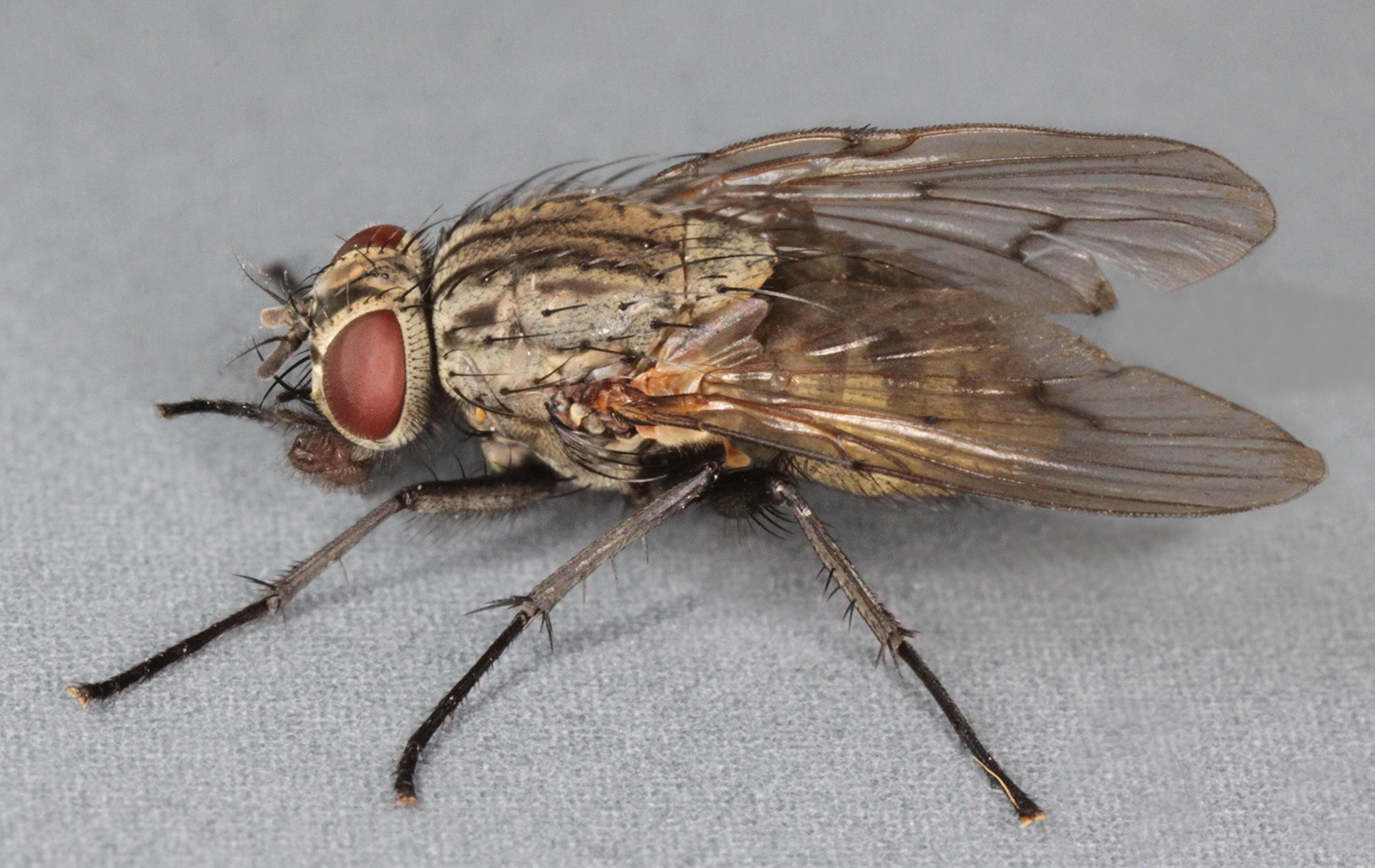
- Helina evecta female

Scientific classification
- Kingdom: Animalia
- Phylum: Arthropoda
- Clade: Pancrustacea
- Class: Insecta
- Order: Diptera
- Family: Muscidae
- Tribe: Phaoniini
- Genus: Helina
- Species: H. evecta

Binomial name
- Helina evecta (Harris, 1780)

Synonyms
- Anthomyza nivalis Zetterstedt, 1838; Helina laetifica (Robineau-Desvoidy, 1830); Helina lucorum (Fallén, 1823); Helina nivalis (Zetterstedt, 1838); Musca evecta Harris, 1780; Musca lucorum Fallén, 1823; Mydina laetifica Robineau-Desvoidy, 1830

= Helina evecta =

Species of fly

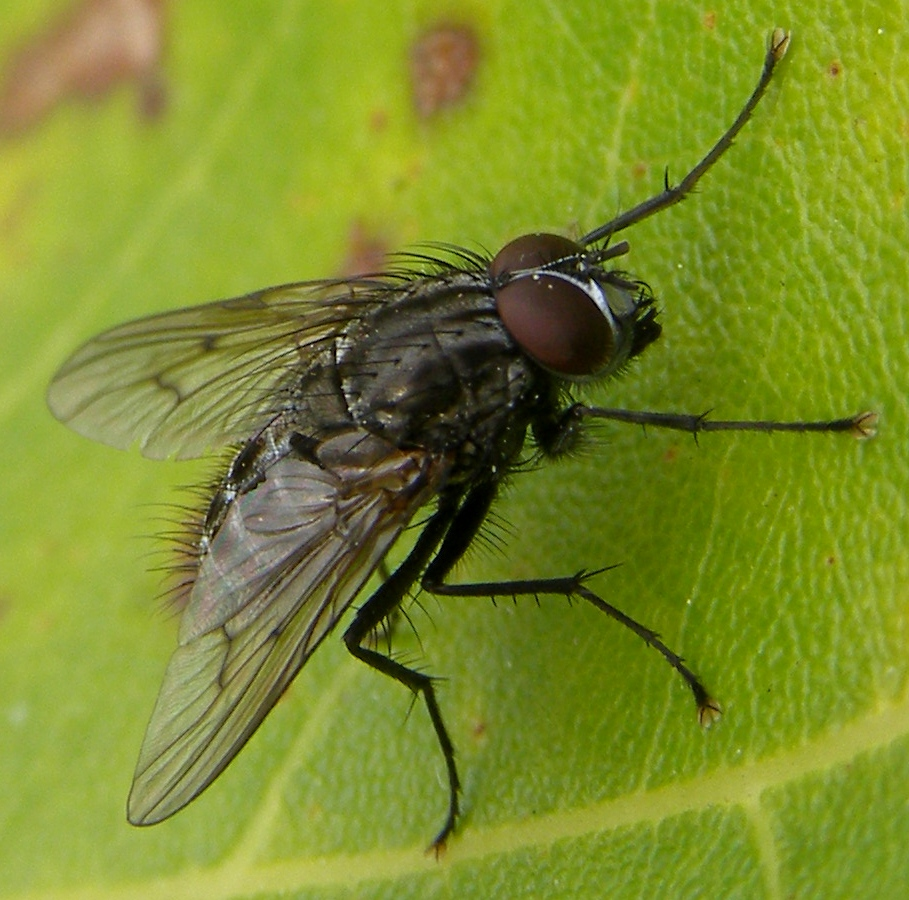
A male Helina evecta

Helina evecta is a fly from the family Muscidae.

== Biology ==
larvae are found in humus soil and moss. Adults are found feeding on Salix and Tussilago in spring.

== Distribution ==
Most of Europe, extending into Asia as far as India. North Africa, and Northern South America.
