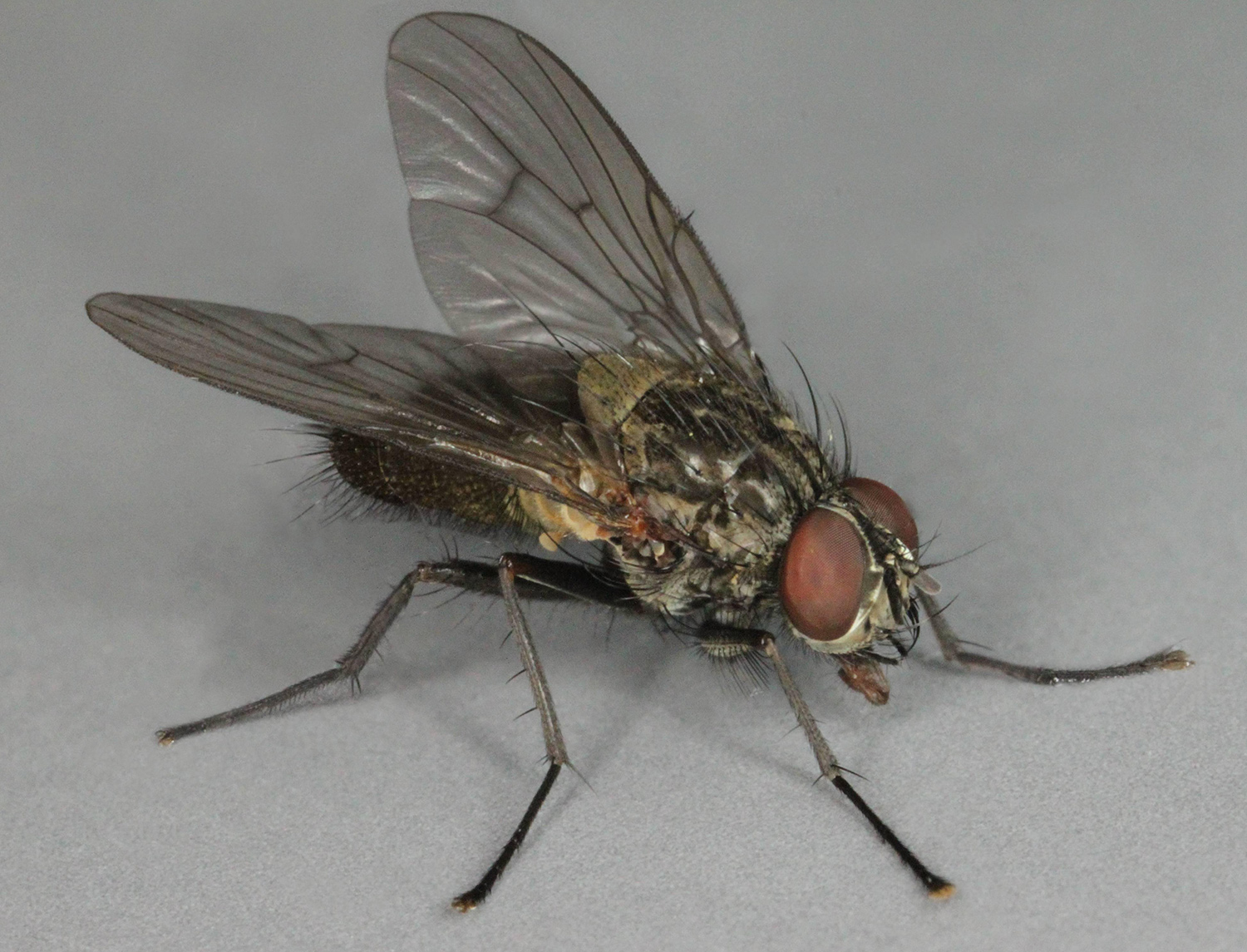
- Helina confinis North Wales

Scientific classification
- Kingdom: Animalia
- Phylum: Arthropoda
- Clade: Pancrustacea
- Class: Insecta
- Order: Diptera
- Family: Muscidae
- Subfamily: Phaoniinae
- Tribe: Phaoniini
- Genus: Helina
- Species: H. confinis

Binomial name
- Helina confinis (Fallén, 1825)

Synonyms
- Musca confinis Fallén, 1825; Anthomyza anceps Zetterstedt, 1837; Anthomyia extrema Walker, 1853

= Helina confinis =

Species of fly

Helina confinis is a fly from the family Muscidae. It is found in the Palearctic.
