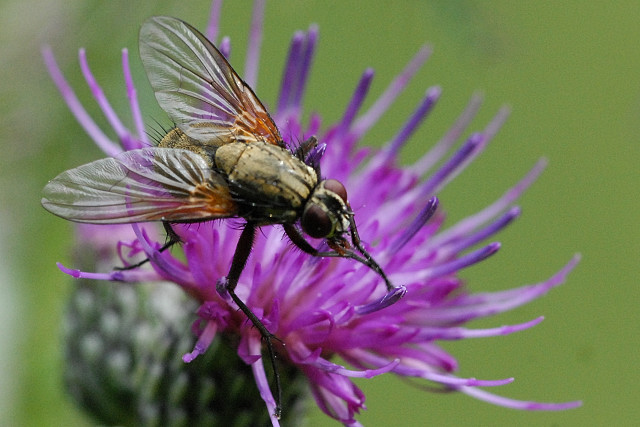

Scientific classification
- Kingdom: Animalia
- Phylum: Arthropoda
- Clade: Pancrustacea
- Class: Insecta
- Order: Diptera
- Family: Muscidae
- Tribe: Phaoniini
- Genus: Helina
- Species: H. reversio

Binomial name
- Helina reversio (Harris, 1780)

Synonyms
- Anthomyia compuncta (Wiedemann, 1817; Anthomyia decedens (Walker, 1853); Anthomyia duplicata (Meigen, 1826); Anthomyia fixa (Walker, 1853); Anthomyia infixa (Walker, 1853); Aricia duplaris (Zetterstedt, 1845); Helina communis (Robineau-Desvoidy, 1830); Helina compuncta (Wiedemann, 1817); Helina decedens (Walker, 1853); Helina duplaris (Zetterstedt, 1845); Helina duplicata (Meigen, 1826); Helina fixa (Walker, 1853); Helina infixa (Walker, 1853); Musca reversio Harris, [1780]; Mydina communis Robineau-Desvoidy, 1830

= Helina reversio =

Species of fly

Helina reversio is a fly from the genus Helina, in the family Muscidae. It is a common and variable fly.

== Biology ==
Larvae are found in cow dung, rotting tree stumps, old hornet's nests, and moss.

== Distribution ==
North America, Many parts of Europe, Northern Asia as far east as Japan.

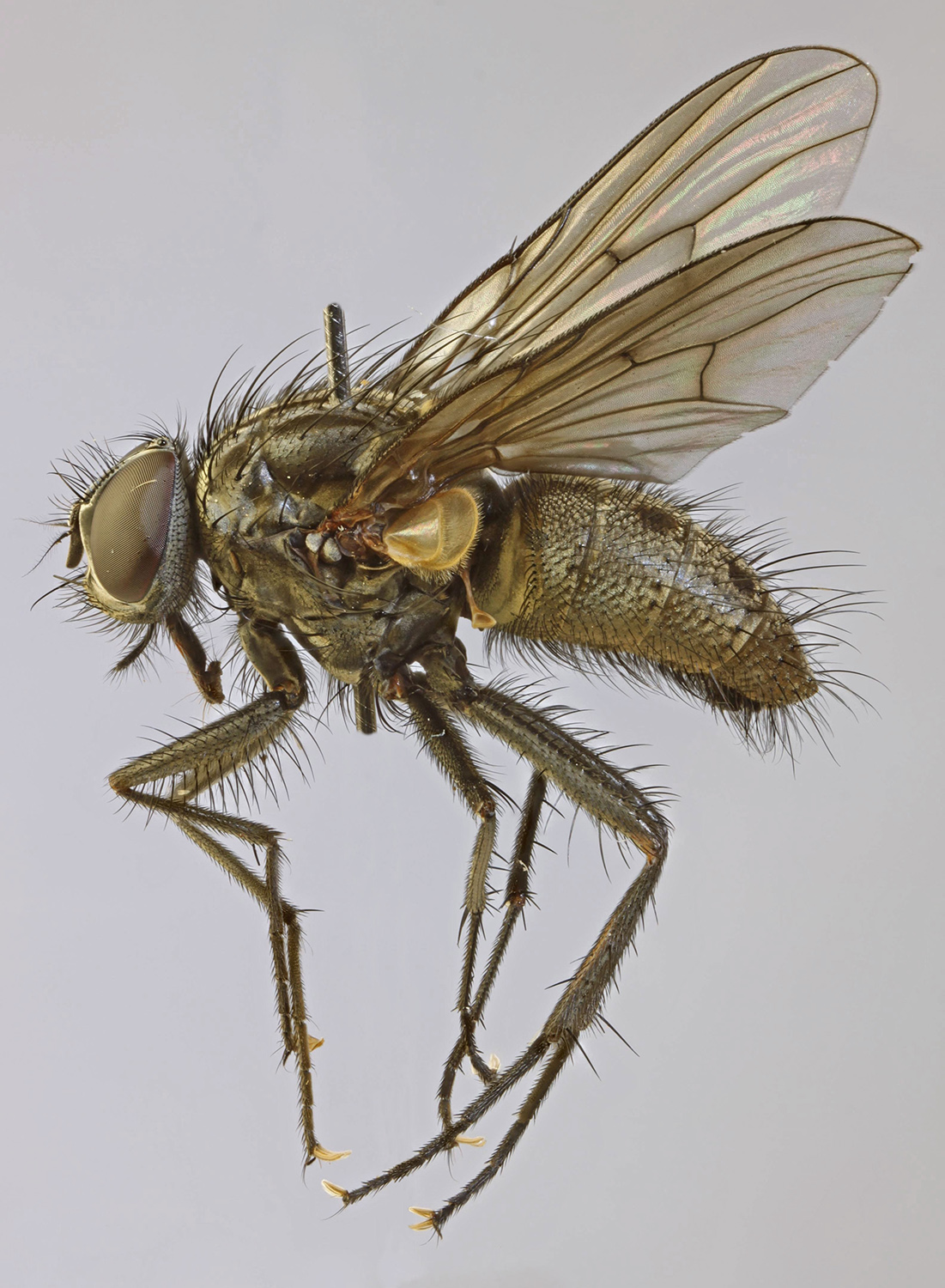
Helina reversio male

== See also ==
- Helina reversio on the Ecology of Commanster Site
