= Helina duplex =

Scientific classification
- Kingdom: Animalia
- Phylum: Arthropoda
- Clade: Pancrustacea
- Class: Insecta
- Order: Diptera
- Family: Muscidae
- Tribe: Phaoniini
- Genus: Helina
- Species: H. duplex

Binomial name
- Helina duplex (Stein, 1900)

Species of fly

Helina duplex is a species of fly in the family Muscidae. It is found in Papua New Guinea, including the Bismark Archipelago, and Queensland, Australia. It was the only Helina species recorded in Papua New Guinea before 1984.
