= Helina pertusa =

Scientific classification
- Kingdom: Animalia
- Phylum: Arthropoda
- Clade: Pancrustacea
- Class: Insecta
- Order: Diptera
- Family: Muscidae
- Tribe: Phaoniini
- Genus: Helina
- Species: H. pertusa

Binomial name
- Helina pertusa (Meigen, 1826)

Synonyms
- Anthomyia pertusa Meigen, 1826

Species of fly

Helina pertusa is a fly from the family Muscidae. It is the type species on the Genus Helina.

== Description ==
6 - 8.5mm Eyes are bare. Black tarsi.

== Biology ==
Larvae are found in leaf litter.

== Distribution ==
Most of west and central Europe.
