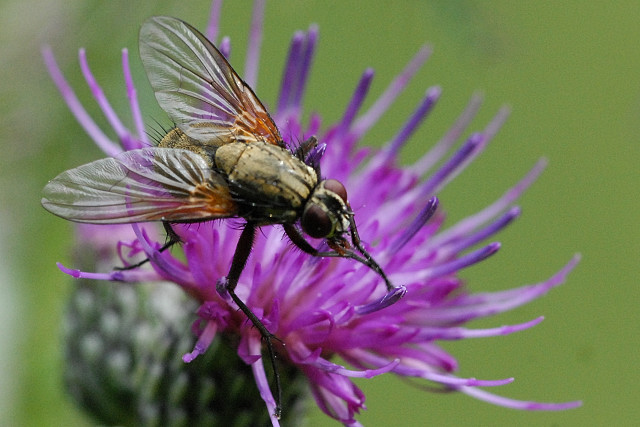
- Helina reversio

Scientific classification
- Kingdom: Animalia
- Phylum: Arthropoda
- Clade: Pancrustacea
- Class: Insecta
- Order: Diptera
- Family: Muscidae
- Subfamily: Phaoniinae
- Tribe: Phaoniini
- Genus: Helina; Robineau-Desvoidy, 1830

Type species
- Anthomyia euphemioidea Robineau-Desvoidy, 1830

Synonyms
- Aricia Robineau-Desvoidy, 1830; Enoplopteryx Hendel, 1902; Quadrularia Huckett, 1965; Spilogaster Macquart, 1835; Yetodesia Rondani, 1861

= Helina =

Genus of flies

Helina is a very large genus from the fly family Muscidae.

Fungal species Strongwellsea selandia and Strongwellsea gefion from (genus Strongwellsea, order Entomophthorales) infects adult flies from genus Helina in Denmark.

== Species ==
- H. abdominalis (Zetterstedt, 1846)
- H. abiens (Stein, 1898)
- H. algonquina Malloch, 1922
- H. allotalla (Meigen, 1830)
- H. annosa (Zetterstedt, 1838)
- H. arctata Collin, 1953
- H. atricolor (Fallén, 1825)
- H. baoshanensis Xue & Li, 2000
- H. barpana (Walker, 1849)
- H. bicolorata (Malloch and Lovett, 1919)
- H. bispinosa Malloch, 1920
- H. bohemani (Ringdahl, 1916)
- H. calceata (Rondani, 1866)
- H. canadensis Snyder, 1949
- H. caneo Snyder, 1941
- H. celsa (Harris, 1780)
- H. ciliatocosta (Zetterstedt, 1845)
- H. cilipes (Schnabl, 1902)
- H. cinerella (van der Wulp, 1867)
- H. concolor (Czerny, 1900)
- H. confinis (Fallén, 1825)
- H. consimilata Malloch, 1920
- H. consimilis (Fallén, 1825)
- H. copiosa (van der Wulp, 1896)
- H. cothurnata (Rondani, 1866)
- H. crinita Collin, 1953
- H. cruciata Snyder, 1941
- H. depuncta (Fallén, 1825)
- H. discreta (van der Wulp, 1896)
- H. duplex (Stein, 1900)
- H. erecta Harris
- H. evecta (Harris, 1780)
- H. exilis (Stein, 1920)
- H. flavisquama (Zetterstedt, 1849)
- H. floridensis Snyder, 1949
- H. fratercula (Zetterstedt, 1845)
- H. fulvisquama (Zetterstedt, 1845)
- H. garretti Snyder, 1949
- H. griseogaster Snyder, 1949
- H. humilis (Stein, 1920)
- H. impuncta (Fallén, 1825)
- H. intermedia (Villeneuve, 1899)
- H. johnsoni Malloch, 1920
- H. keremeosa Snyder, 1949
- H. lasiophthalma (Macquart, 1835)
- H. lasiosterna Snyder, 1941
- H. latitarsis Ringdahl, 1924
- H. laxifrons (Zetterstedt, 1860)
- H. linearis Malloch, 1920
- H. longicornis (Zetterstedt, 1838)
- H. luteisquama (Zetterstedt, 1845)
- H. maculipennis (Zetterstedt, 1845)
- H. marguerita Snyder, 1949
- H. meraca (van der Wulp, 1896)
- H. mulcata (Giglio-tos, 1893)
- H. multiseriata Malloch, 1922
- H. nigribasis Malloch, 1920
- H. nigripennis (Walker, 1849)
- H. nigrita Malloch, 1920
- H. nudibasis Snyder, 1949
- H. obscurata (Meigen, 1826)
- H. obscuratoides (Schnabl, 1887)
- H. obscurinervis (Stein, 1898)
- H. orbitaseta (Stein, 1898)
- H. oregonensis (Malloch and Lovett, 1919)
- H. parcepilosa (Stein, 1907)
- H. parvula (van der Wulp, 1896)
- H. pectinata (Johannsen, 1916)
- H. pertusa (Meigen, 1826)
- H. platykarenos Huckett, 1966
- H. polychaeta Huckett, 1966
- H. procedens (Walker, 1861)
- H. protuberans (Zetterstedt, 1845)
- H. pubescens (Stein, 1893)
- H. pubiseta (Zetterstedt, 1845)
- H. pulchella (Ringdahl, 1918)
- H. quadrinotata (Meigen, 1826)
- H. quadrum (Fabricius, 1805)
- H. refusa (Giglio-tos, 1893)
- H. reversio (Harris, 1780)
- H. rubripalpis (van der Wulp, 1896)
- H. rufitibia (Stein, 1898)
- H. sera (Gitlio-tos, 1893)
- H. setifer Huckett, 1965
- H. setiventris Ringdahl, 1924
- H. sexmaculata (Preyssler, 1791)
- H. signatipennis (van der Wulp, 1896)
- H. snyderi Steyskal, 1966
- H. socia (van der Wulp, 1896)
- H. spinicosta (Zetterstedt, 1845)
- H. spinilamellata Malloch, 1920
- H. spinosa (Walker, 1849)
- H. spuria Malloch, 1920
- H. squalens (Zetterstedt, 1838)
- H. steini Pont, 1988
- H. subvittata (Séguy, 1923)
- H. tarsalis (Stein, 1918)
- H. tetrastigma (Meigen, 1826)
- H. toga Snyder, 1949
- H. trivittata (Zetterstedt, 1860)
- H. troene (Walker, 1849)
- H. ute Snyder, 1949
- H. vicina (Czerny, 1900)
- H. villihumilis Snyder, 1949
