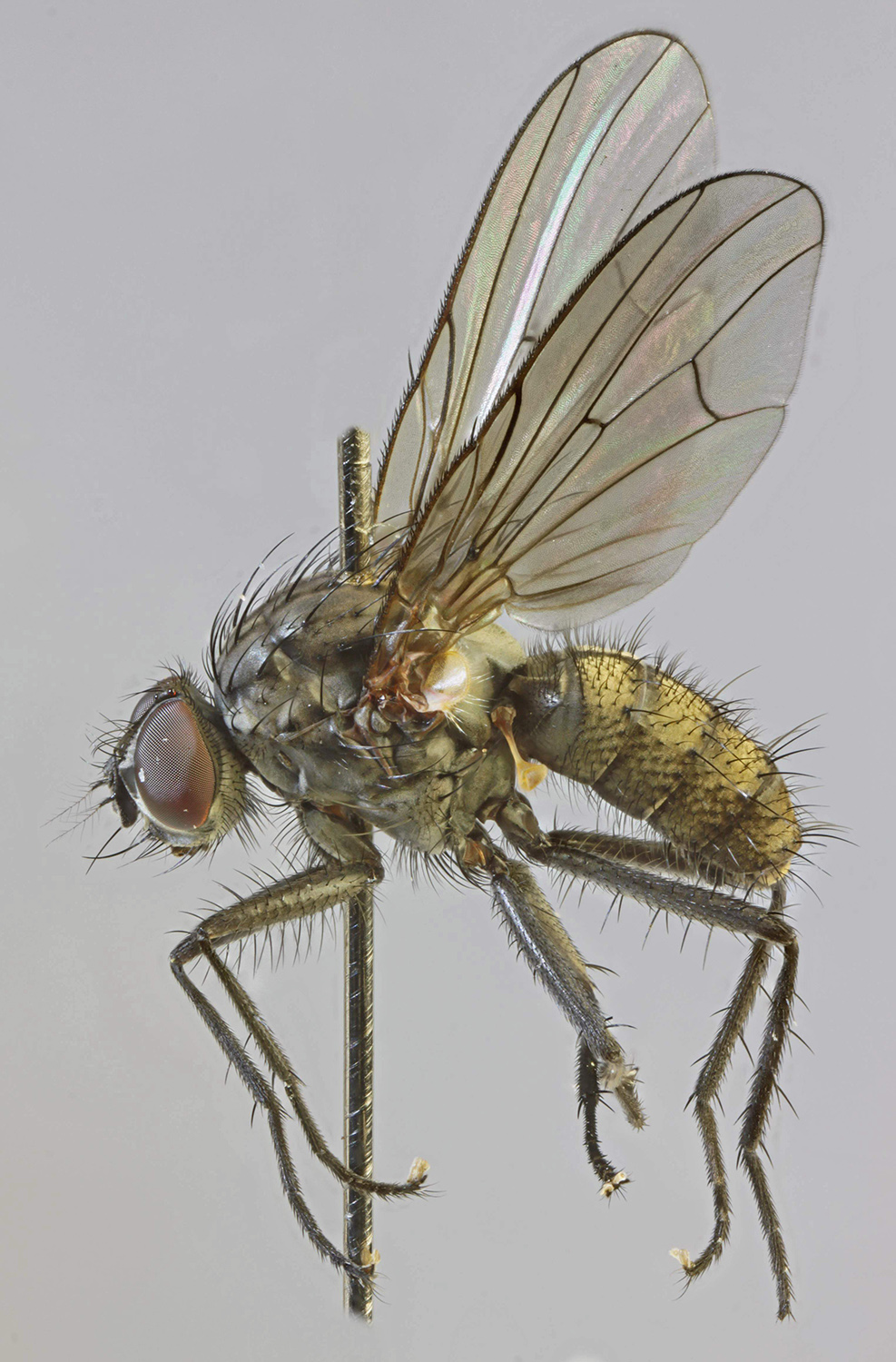
- Hylemya urbica North Wales

Scientific classification
- Kingdom: Animalia
- Phylum: Arthropoda
- Class: Insecta
- Order: Diptera
- Family: Anthomyiidae
- Genus: Hylemya
- Species: H. urbica

Binomial name
- Hylemya urbica Wulp, 1896

= Hylemya urbica =

Species of fly

Hylemya urbica is a species of fly in the family Anthomyiidae. It is found in the Palearctic. For identification see:
