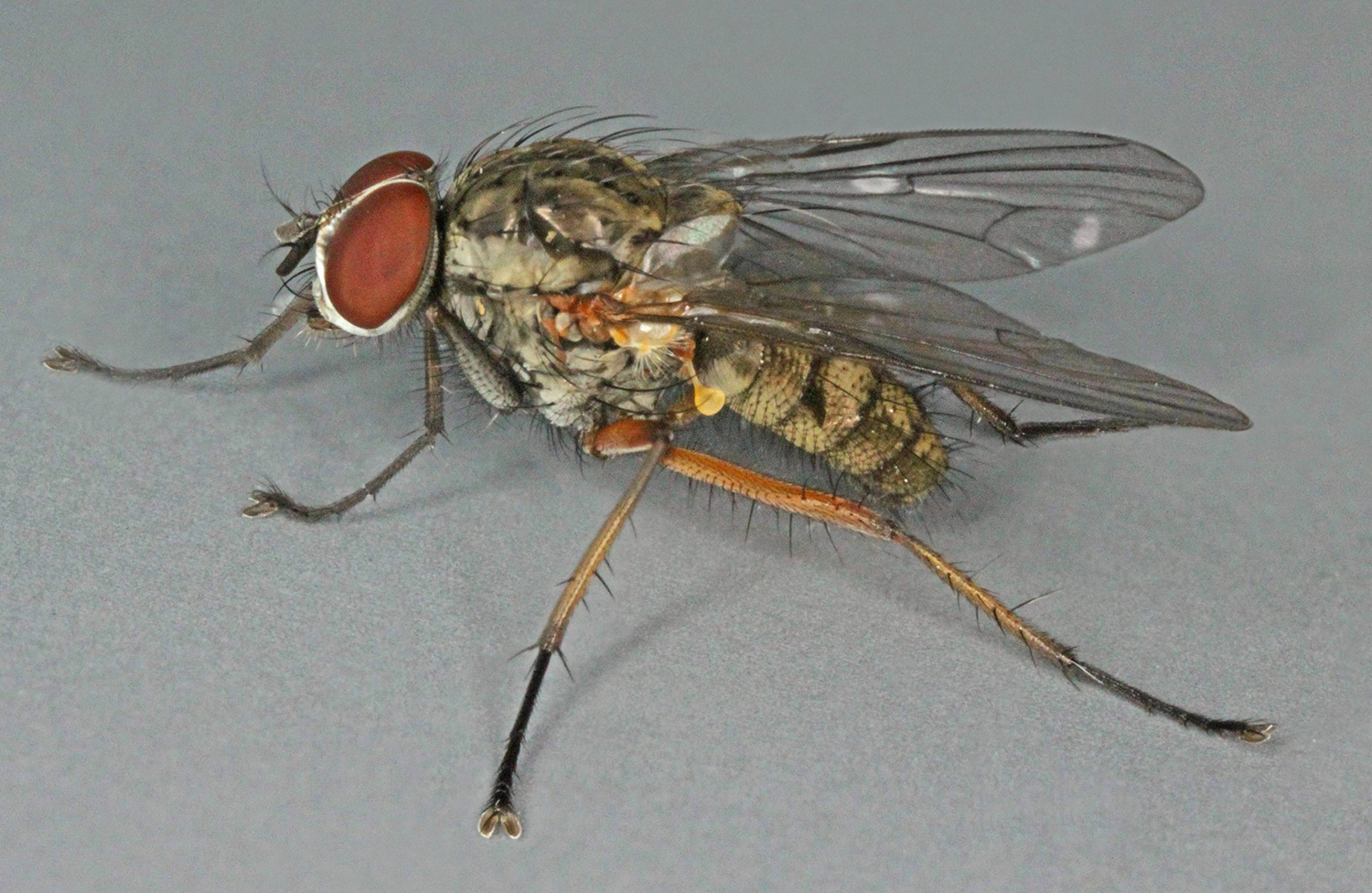
- Hylemya nigrimana North Wales

Scientific classification
- Kingdom: Animalia
- Phylum: Arthropoda
- Class: Insecta
- Order: Diptera
- Family: Anthomyiidae
- Genus: Hylemya
- Species: H. nigrimana

Binomial name
- Hylemya nigrimana (Meigen, 1826)

= Hylemya nigrimana =

Species of fly

Hylemya nigrimana is a species of fly in the family Anthomyiidae. It is found in the Palearctic. For identification see:
