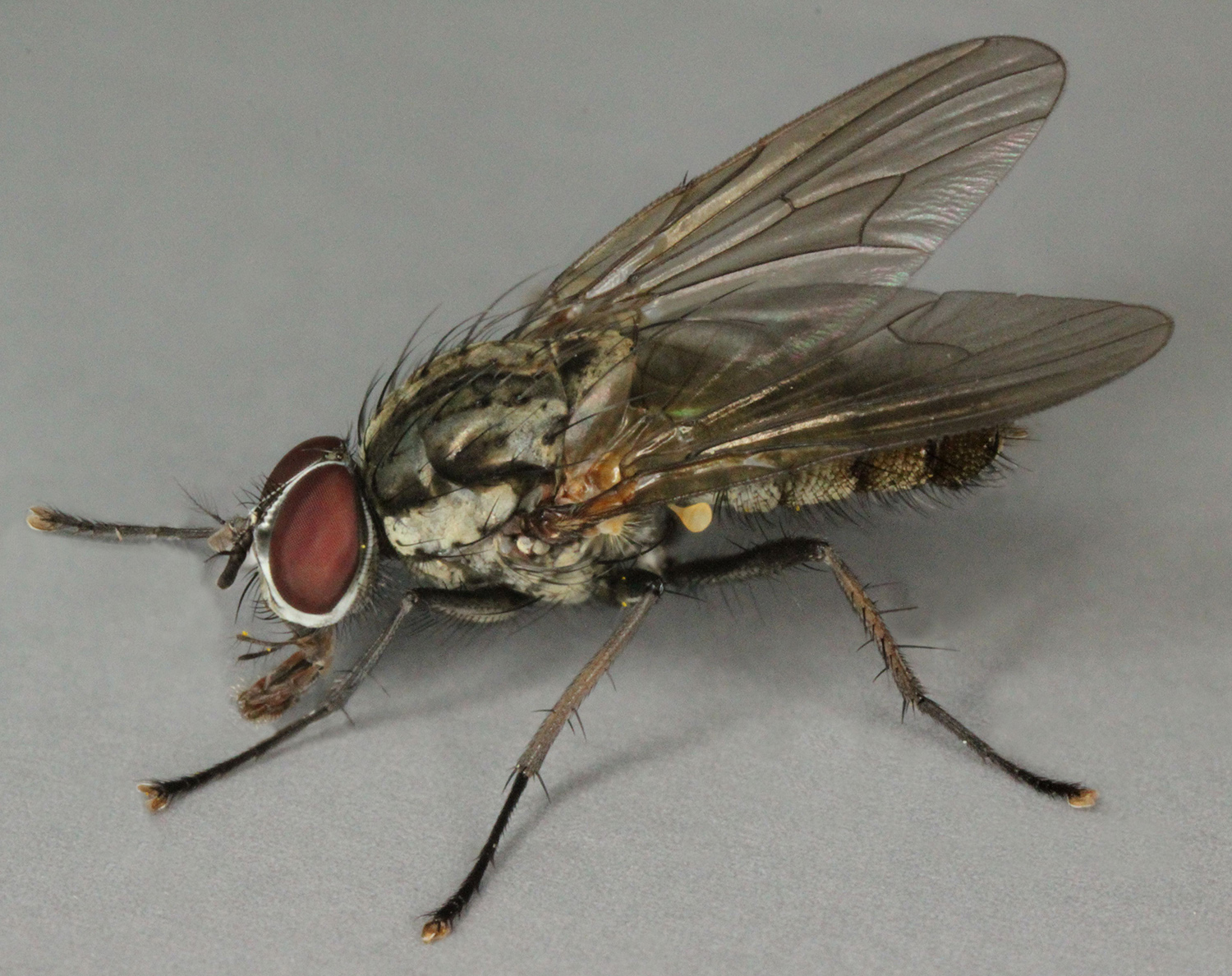
- Hylemya vagans North Wales

Scientific classification
- Kingdom: Animalia
- Phylum: Arthropoda
- Class: Insecta
- Order: Diptera
- Family: Anthomyiidae
- Genus: Hylemya
- Species: H. vagans

Binomial name
- Hylemya vagans (Panzer, 1798)

= Hylemya vagans =

Species of fly

Hylemya vagans is a species of fly in the family Anthomyiidae. It is found in the Palearctic.
