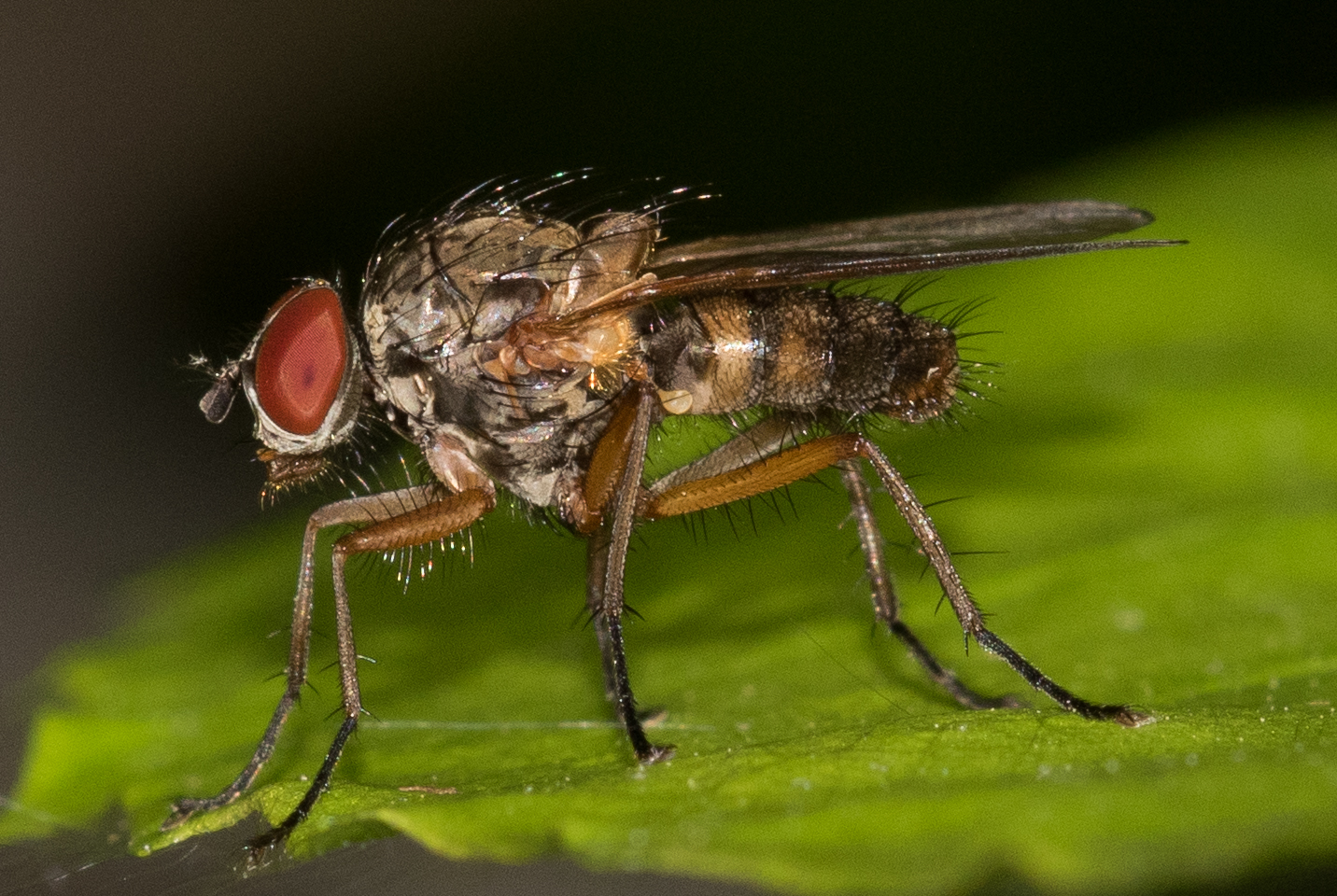

Scientific classification
- Kingdom: Animalia
- Phylum: Arthropoda
- Class: Insecta
- Order: Diptera
- Family: Anthomyiidae
- Subfamily: Anthomyiinae
- Tribe: Anthomyini
- Genus: Hylemya
- Species: H. alcathoe

Binomial name
- Hylemya alcathoe (Walker, 1849)

Synonyms
- Anthomyia alcathoe Walker, 1849; Hylemyia flavicaudata Bigot, 1885; Hylemyia strigata Stein, 1898; Hylemyia tenax Johannsen, 1916

= Hylemya alcathoe =

Species of fly

Hylemya alcathoe is a species of root-maggot flies in the family Anthomyiidae.

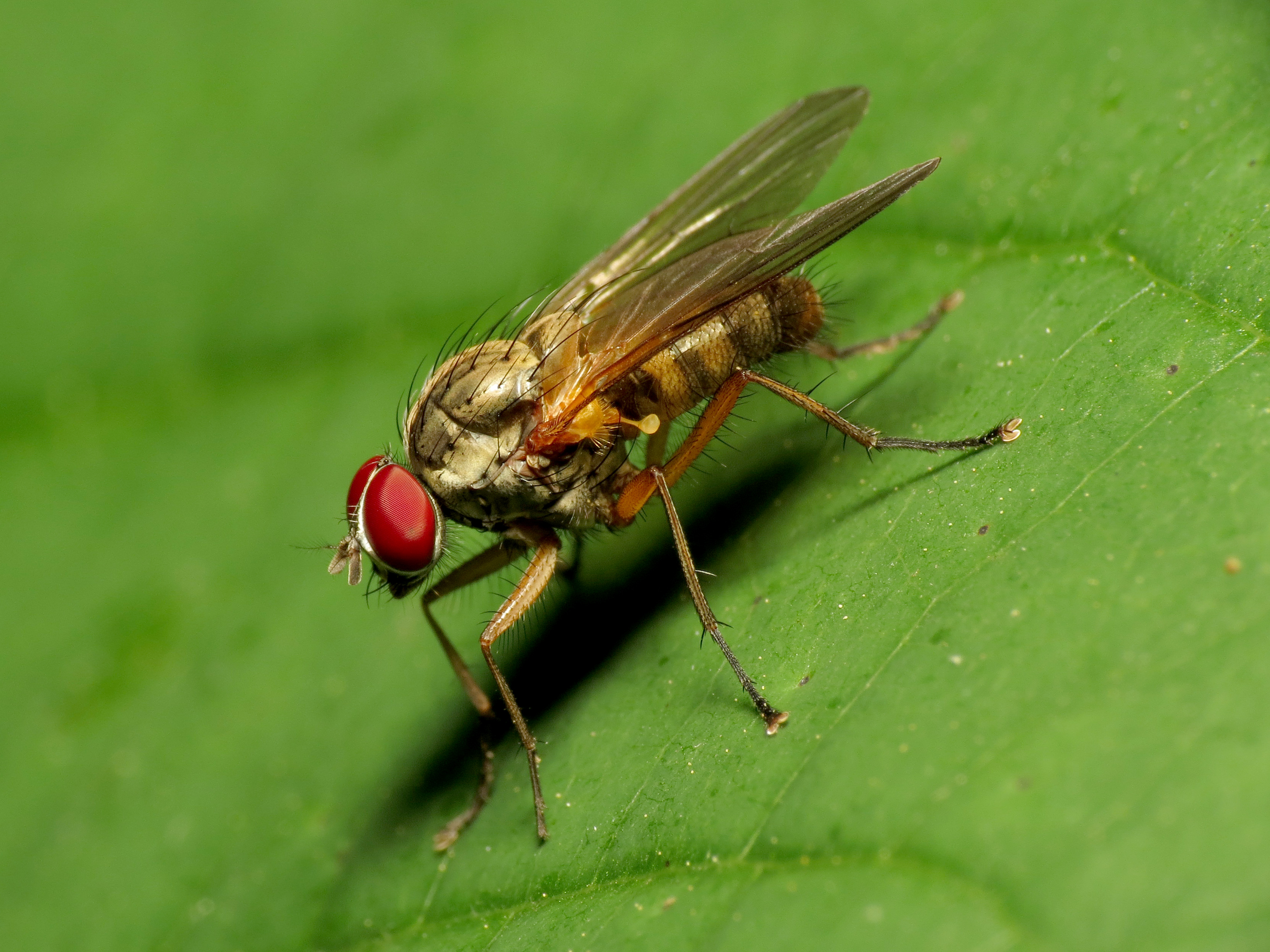
