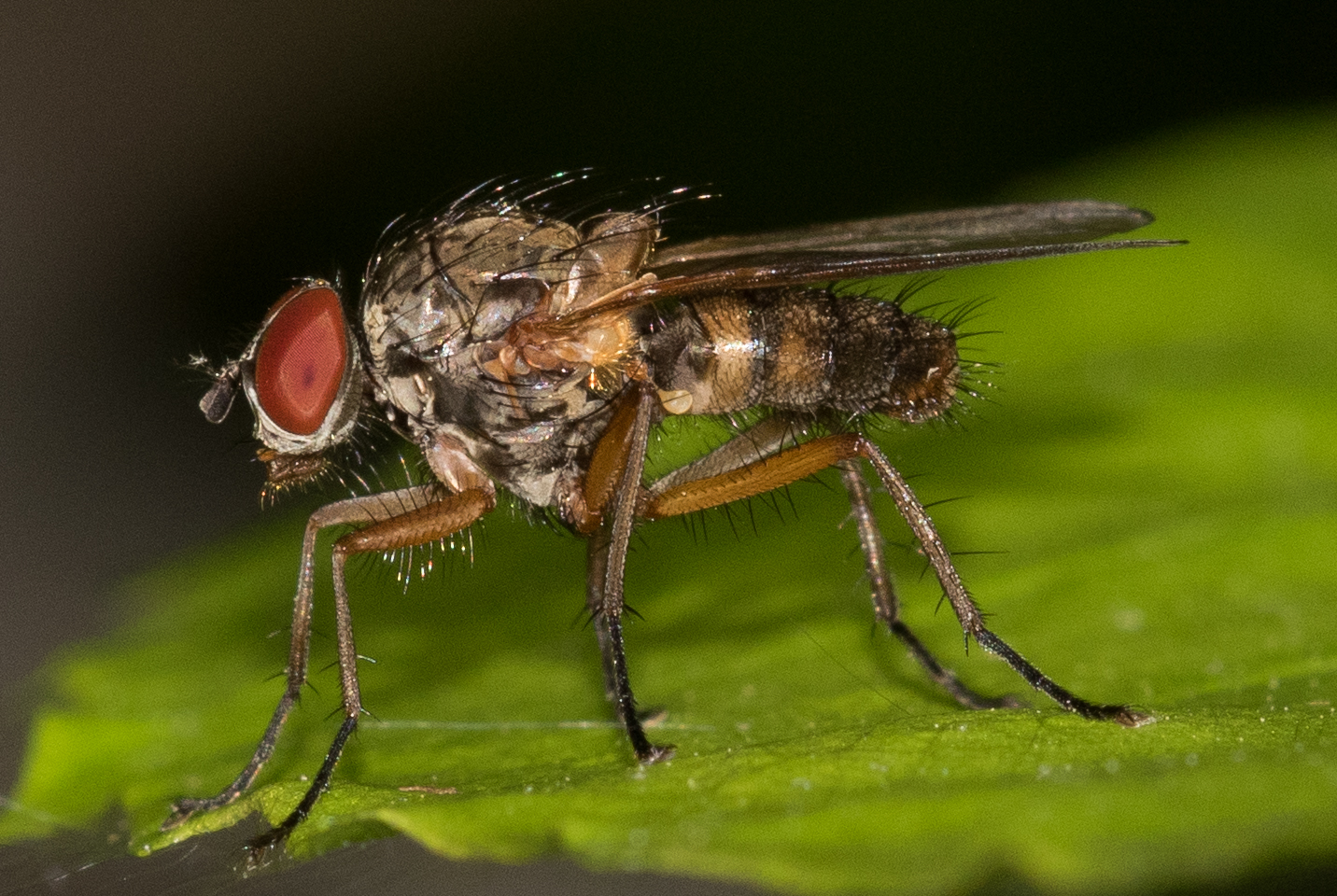
- Hylemya alcathoe

Scientific classification
- Domain: Eukaryota
- Kingdom: Animalia
- Phylum: Arthropoda
- Class: Insecta
- Order: Diptera
- Family: Anthomyiidae
- Subfamily: Anthomyiinae
- Tribe: Anthomyini
- Genus: Hylemya; Robineau-Desvoidy, 1830

= Hylemya =

Genus of flies

Hylemya is a genus of root-maggot flies in the family Anthomyiidae. There are at least 30 described species in Hylemya.

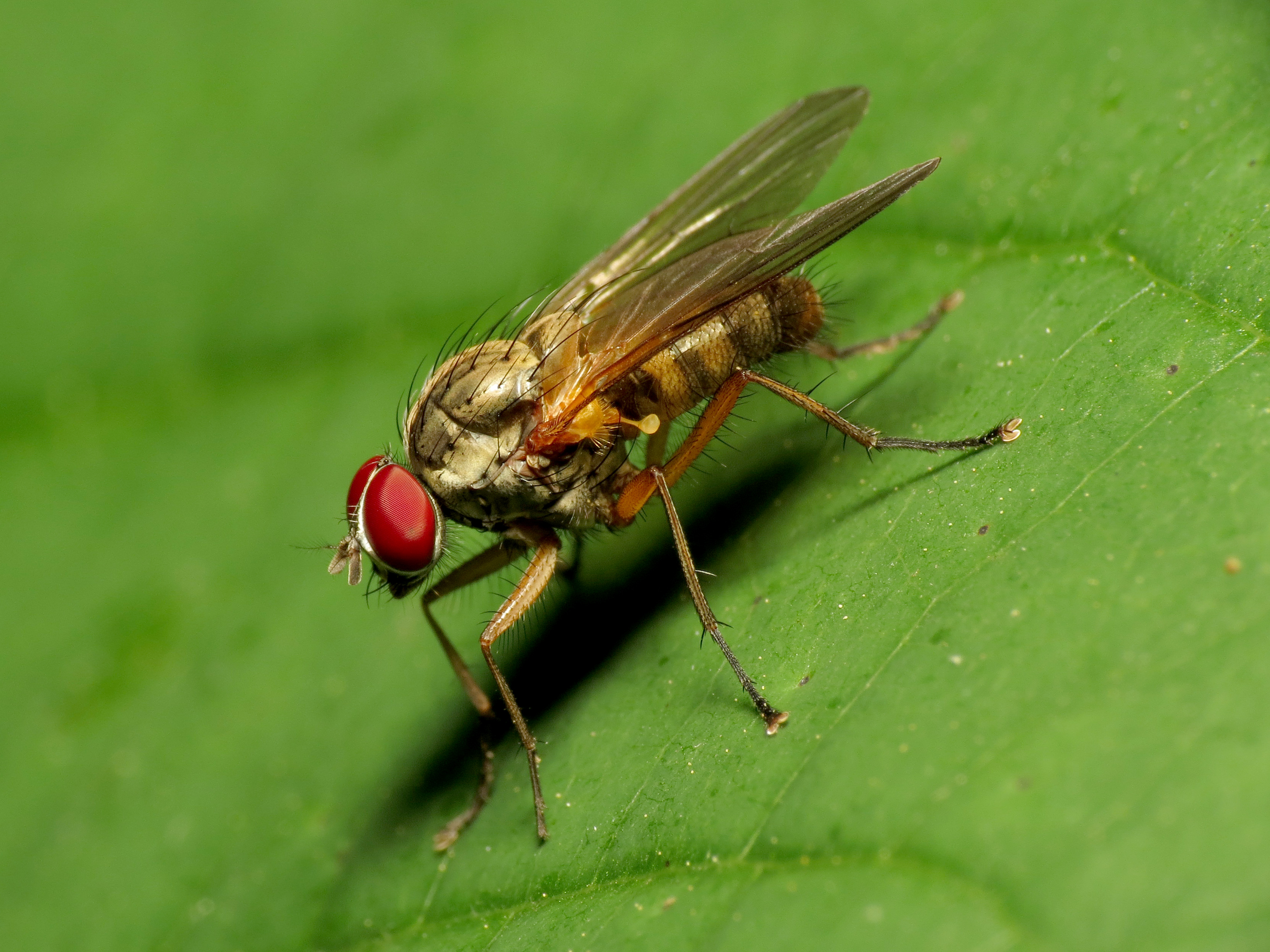
Hylemya alcathoe

== Species ==
These 31 species belong to the genus Hylemya:

- H. agrestis (Robineau-Desvoidy, 1830)^{c g}
- H. alcathoe (Walker, 1849)^{i c g b}
- H. autumnalis (Robineau-Desvoidy, 1830)^{c g}
- H. brevistyla Suwa, 2002^{c g}
- H. bruneipalpis Fan, 1982^{c g}
- H. detracta (Walker, 1853)^{c g}
- H. facilis (Meigen, 1838)^{c g}
- H. femoralis (Stein, 1915)^{c g}
- H. flavicruralis Suwa, 1989^{c g}
- H. flavipennis (Robineau-Desvoidy, 1830)^{c g}
- H. genurfa (Villeneuve, 1911)^{c g}
- H. kuntzei (Ringdahl, 1934)^{c g}
- H. latevittata (Stein, 1908)^{c g}
- H. longirostris Suwa, 1989^{c g}
- H. meigeni (Schnabl, 1911)^{c g}
- H. neglecta (Karl, 1943)^{c g}
- H. nigrimana (Meigen, 1826)^{c g}
- H. nigripes (Robineau-Desvoidy, 1830)^{c g}
- H. partita (Meigen, 1826)^{b}
- H. probata (Walker, 1861)^{c g}
- H. probilis Ackland, 1967^{c g}
- H. rufa (Meigen, 1838)^{c g}
- H. seideli (Hering, 1925)^{c g}
- H. stackelbergi (Ringdahl, 1934)^{c g}
- H. subcilicrura (Séguy, 1937)^{c g}
- H. supraorbitalis Fan, 1982^{c g}
- H. takagii Suwa, 1977^{c g}
- H. urbica Wulp, 1896^{g}
- H. vagans (Panzer, 1798)^{c g}
- H. variata (Fallén, 1823)^{c g}

Data sources: i = ITIS, c = Catalogue of Life, g = GBIF, b = Bugguide.net
