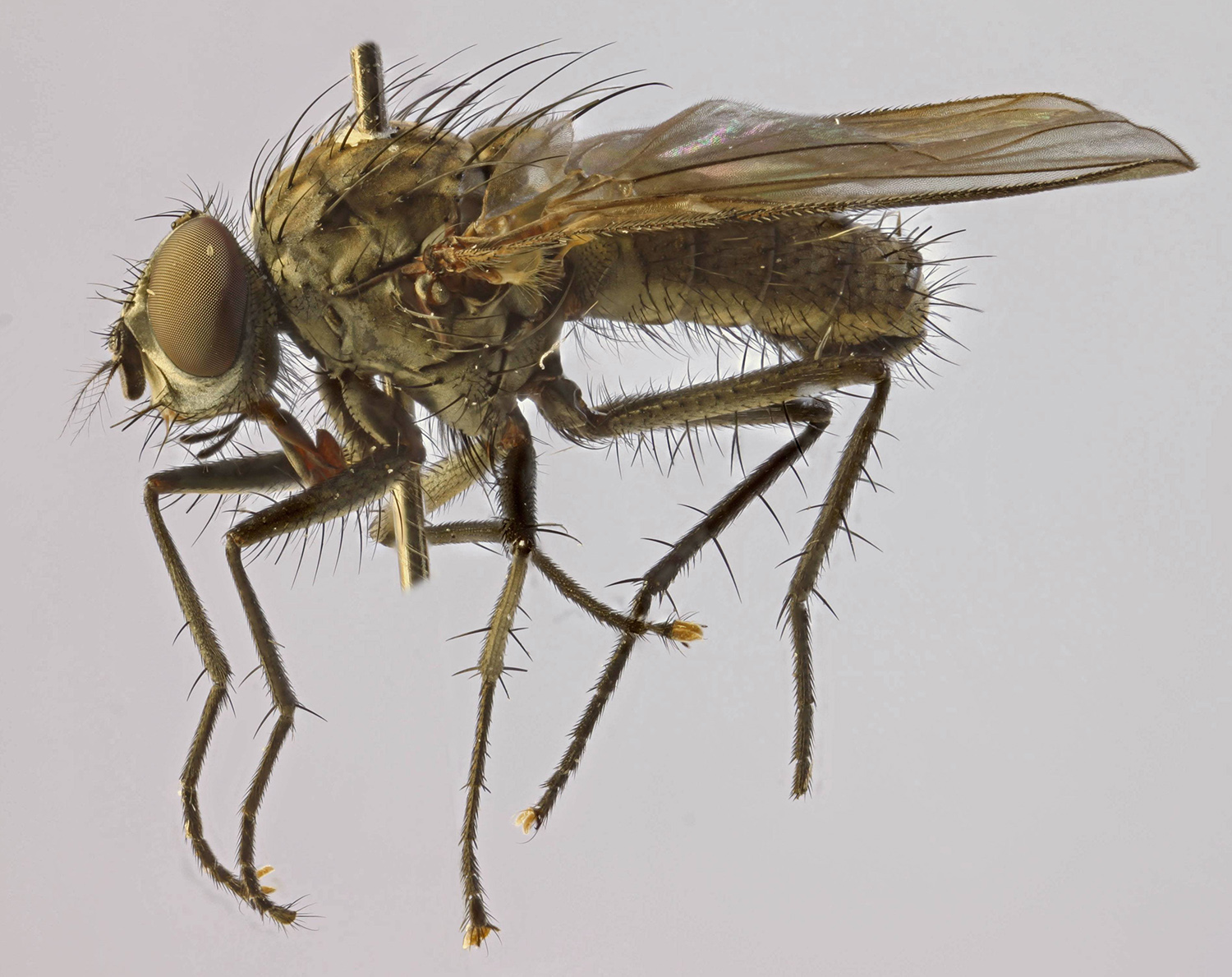
- Hylemya variata North Wales

Scientific classification
- Kingdom: Animalia
- Phylum: Arthropoda
- Class: Insecta
- Order: Diptera
- Family: Anthomyiidae
- Genus: Hylemya
- Species: H. variata

Binomial name
- Hylemya variata (Fallen, 1823)

= Hylemya variata =

Species of fly

Hylemya variata is a species of fly in the family Anthomyiidae. It is found in the Palearctic. For identification see:
