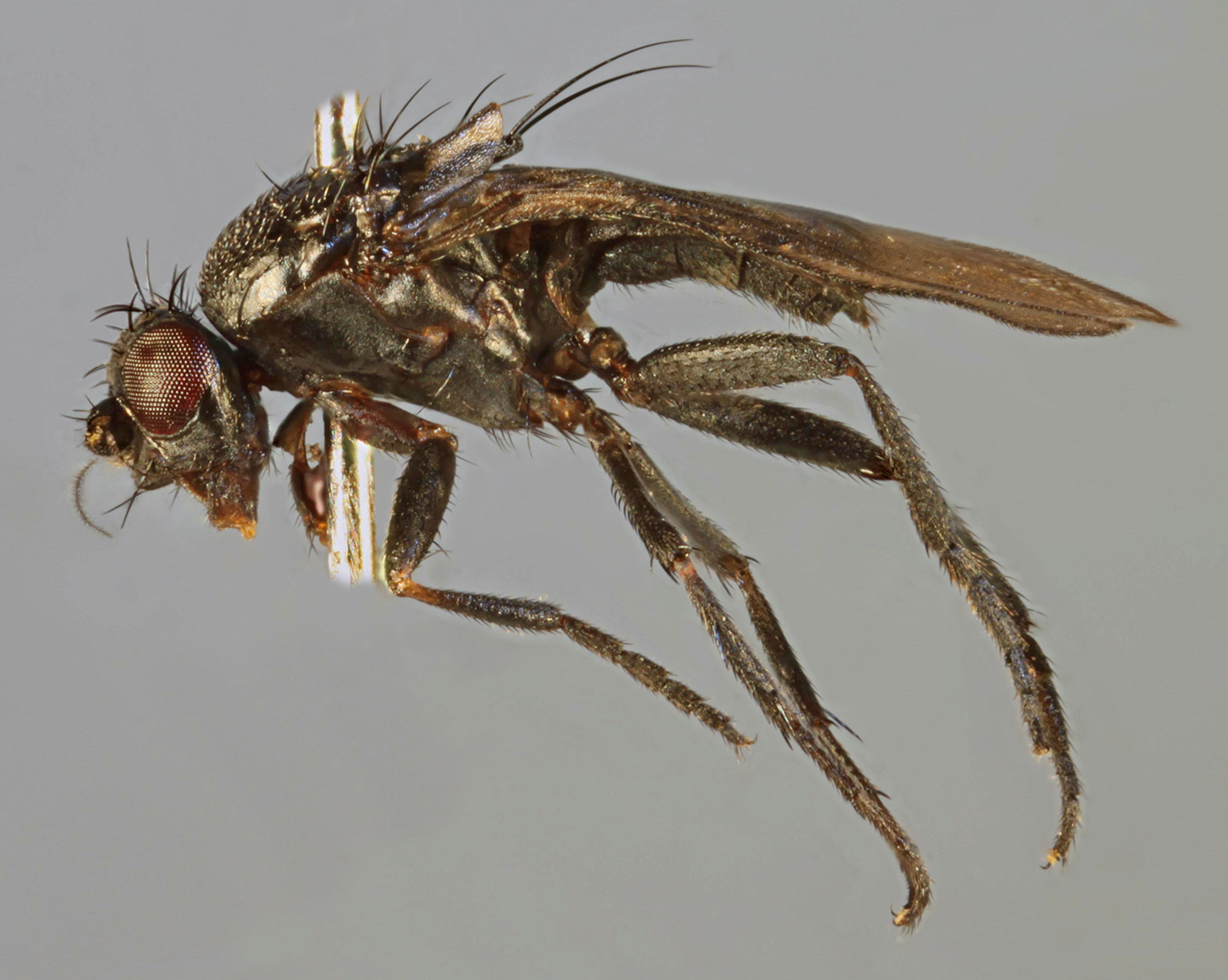

Scientific classification
- Kingdom: Animalia
- Phylum: Arthropoda
- Class: Insecta
- Order: Diptera
- Family: Sphaeroceridae
- Genus: Spelobia
- Species: S. clunipes

Binomial name
- Spelobia clunipes (Meigen, 1830)

Synonyms
- Borborus clunipes Meigen, 1830; Limosina crassimana Duda, 1918; Copromyza pygmaea Zetterstedt, 1838; Limosina nigrinervis Dahl, 1909

= Spelobia clunipes =

Species of fly

Spelobia clunipes is a species of fly in the family Sphaeroceridae.

== Distribution ==
Canada, United States, Afghanistan, Andorra, Austria, Azores, Belgium, Bulgaria, China, Czech Republic, Cyprus, Denmark, Estonia, Faeroe Islands, Finland, France, Germany, Great Britain, Hungary, Iceland, Ireland, Italy, Latvia, Lithuania, Mongolia, Netherlands, North Macedonia, Norway, Poland, Portugal, Romania, Russia, Slovakia, Slovenia, Spain, Sweden, Switzerland, Tajikistan, Tunisia, Ukraine, Uzbekistan, Montenegro, Serbia.
