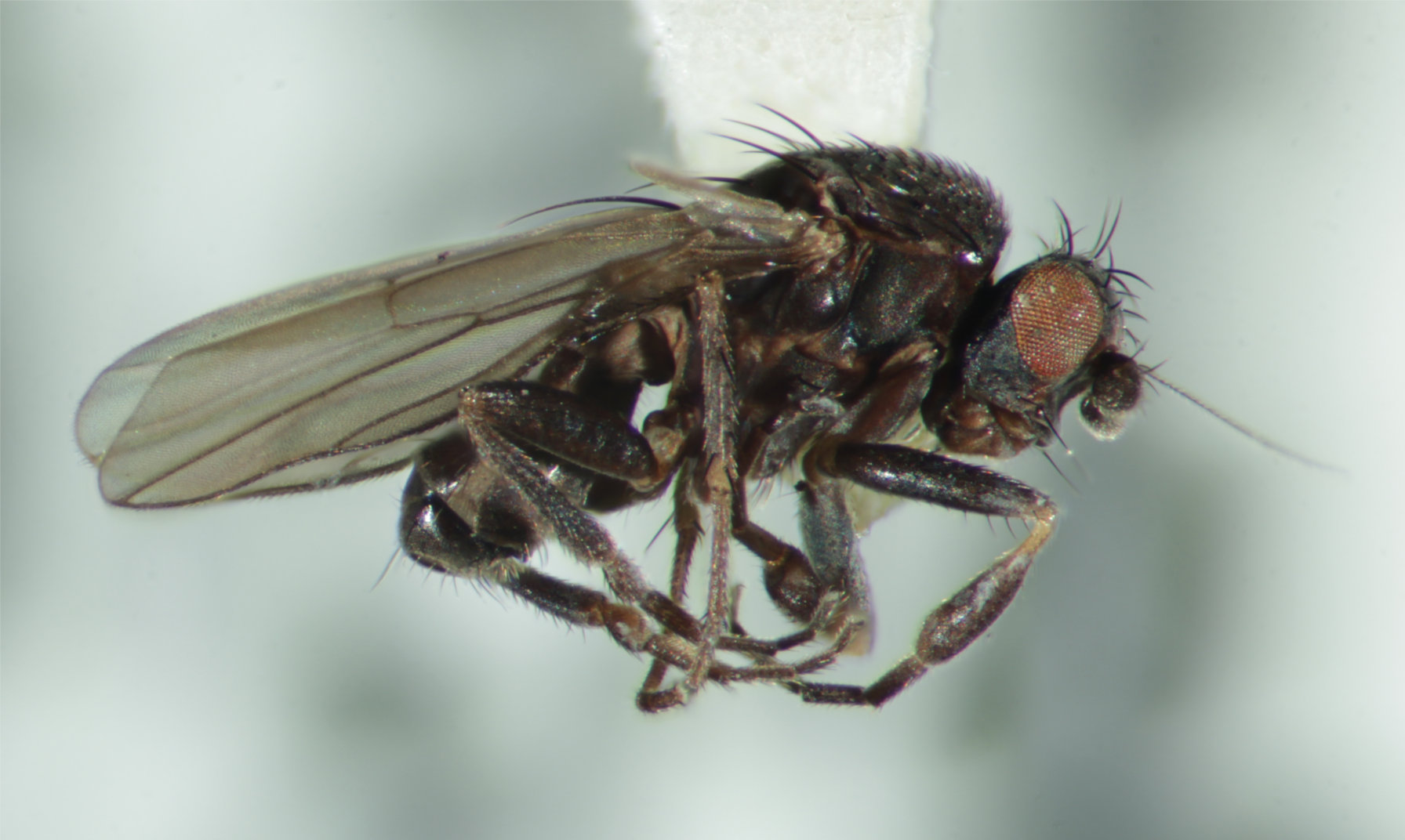
- Spelobia talparum

Scientific classification
- Kingdom: Animalia
- Phylum: Arthropoda
- Class: Insecta
- Order: Diptera
- Family: Sphaeroceridae
- Subfamily: Limosininae
- Genus: Spelobia; Spuler, 1924

Type species
- Limosina tenebrarum Aldrich, 1897

= Spelobia =

Genus of flies

Spelobia is a genus of flies in the family Sphaeroceridae.

== Species ==
Subgenus Bifronsina Roháček, 1982

- Spelobia bifrons (Stenhammar, 1854)^{i c g}

Subgenus Eulimosina (Eulimosina, 1983)

- Spelobia ochripes (Meigen, 1830)^{i c g b}

Subgenus Spelobia Spuler, 1924

- Spelobia abundans (Spuler, 1925)^{i c g}
- Spelobia acadiensis Marshall, 1985^{i c g}
- Spelobia aciculata Marshall, 1985^{c g}
- Spelobia algida Marshall, 1989^{c g}
- Spelobia baezi (Papp, 1977)
- Spelobia beadyi Marshall, 1985^{c g}
- Spelobia belanica Rohacek, 1983^{c g}
- Spelobia bispina Marshall, 1985^{i c g}
- Spelobia brevipteryx Marshall, 1985^{i c g}
- Spelobia brunealata Marshall, 1985^{c g}
- Spelobia brunneiptera (Papp, 1973)
- Spelobia bumamma Marshall, 1985^{i c g}
- Spelobia cambrica (Richards, 1929)
- Spelobia clunipes (Meigen, 1830)^{i c g}
- Spelobia costalis (Becker, 1920)
- Spelobia curvata Marshall, 1985^{i c g}
- Spelobia curvipecta Marshall, 1985^{i c g}
- Spelobia czizeki (Duda, 1918)
- Spelobia depilicercus Marshall, 1985^{i c g}
- Spelobia divergens (Papp, 1973)
- Spelobia dudai (Papp, 1978)
- Spelobia duplisetaria (Papp, 1973)
- Spelobia eclecta (Papp, 1973)
- Spelobia faeroensis (Deeming, 1966)^{c g}
- Spelobia frustrilabris Marshall, 1985^{i c g}
- Spelobia fungivora Marshall, 1985^{i c g}
- Spelobia ghaznavi (Papp, 1978)
- Spelobia glabrocercata (Papp, 1973)
- Spelobia hirsuta^{i c g}
- Spelobia hungarica (Villeneuve, 1917)^{g}
- Spelobia ibrida Rohacek, 1983^{c g}
- Spelobia interima (Papp, 1973)
- Spelobia lineatarsata (Papp, 1973)
- Spelobia lucifuga (Spuler, 1925)^{i c g}
- Spelobia luteilabris (Rondani, 1880)^{i c g}
- Spelobia macrosetitarsalis (Papp, 1974)
- Spelobia maculipennis (Spuler, 1925)^{i c g b}
- Spelobia manicata (Richards, 1927)
- Spelobia mexicana Marshall, 1985^{c g}
- Spelobia multihama^{i c g}
- Spelobia nana (Rondani, 1880)
- Spelobia nigrifrons (Spuler, 1925)^{i c g}
- Spelobia nudiprocta Marshall, 1985^{i c g}
- Spelobia occidentalis (Adams, 1904)^{i c g}
- Spelobia ordinaria (Spuler, 1925)^{i c g}
- Spelobia ovata Marshall, 1985^{i c g}
- Spelobia palmata (Richards, 1927)
- Spelobia pappi Rohacek, 1983^{i c g}
- Spelobia paraczizeki (Papp, 1973)
- Spelobia paralineatarsata (Papp, 1973)
- Spelobia parapenetralis (Papp, 1973)
- Spelobia parapusio (Dahl, 1909)
- Spelobia paratalparum (Papp, 1973)
- Spelobia peltata Marshall, 1985^{i c g}
- Spelobia pickeringi Marshall, 2003^{c g}
- Spelobia pseudoluteilabris (Papp, 1973)
- Spelobia pseudonivalis (Dahl, 1909)
- Spelobia pseudosetaria (Duda, 1918)^{c g}
- Spelobia pseudosetitarsalis (Papp, 1973)
- Spelobia pulliforma Marshall, 1985^{i c g}
- Spelobia quadrata Marshall, 1985^{i c g}
- Spelobia quaesita Rohacek, 1983^{c g}
- Spelobia quinata Marshall, 1985^{i c g}
- Spelobia rimata Marshall, 1985^{c g}
- Spelobia robinsoni Marshall, 1985^{c g}
- Spelobia rufilabris (Stenhammar, 1855)
- Spelobia sejuncta Marshall, 1985^{i c g}
- Spelobia semioculata (Richards, 1965)^{c g}
- Spelobia setilaterata (Papp, 1973)
- Spelobia setitarsalis (Papp, 1973)
- Spelobia simplicipes (Duda, 1925)
- Spelobia spinifemorata (Papp, 1973)
- Spelobia talis Rohacek, 1983^{c g}
- Spelobia talparum (Richards, 1927)
- Spelobia tenebrarum (Aldrich, 1897)^{i c g}
- Spelobia tuberculosa Marshall, 1985^{i c g}
- Spelobia tufta Marshall, 1985^{i c g}
- Spelobia typhlops (Richards, 1965)^{c g b}
- Spelobia ulla Rohacek, 1983^{c g}

Data sources: i = ITIS, c = Catalogue of Life, g = GBIF, b = Bugguide.net
