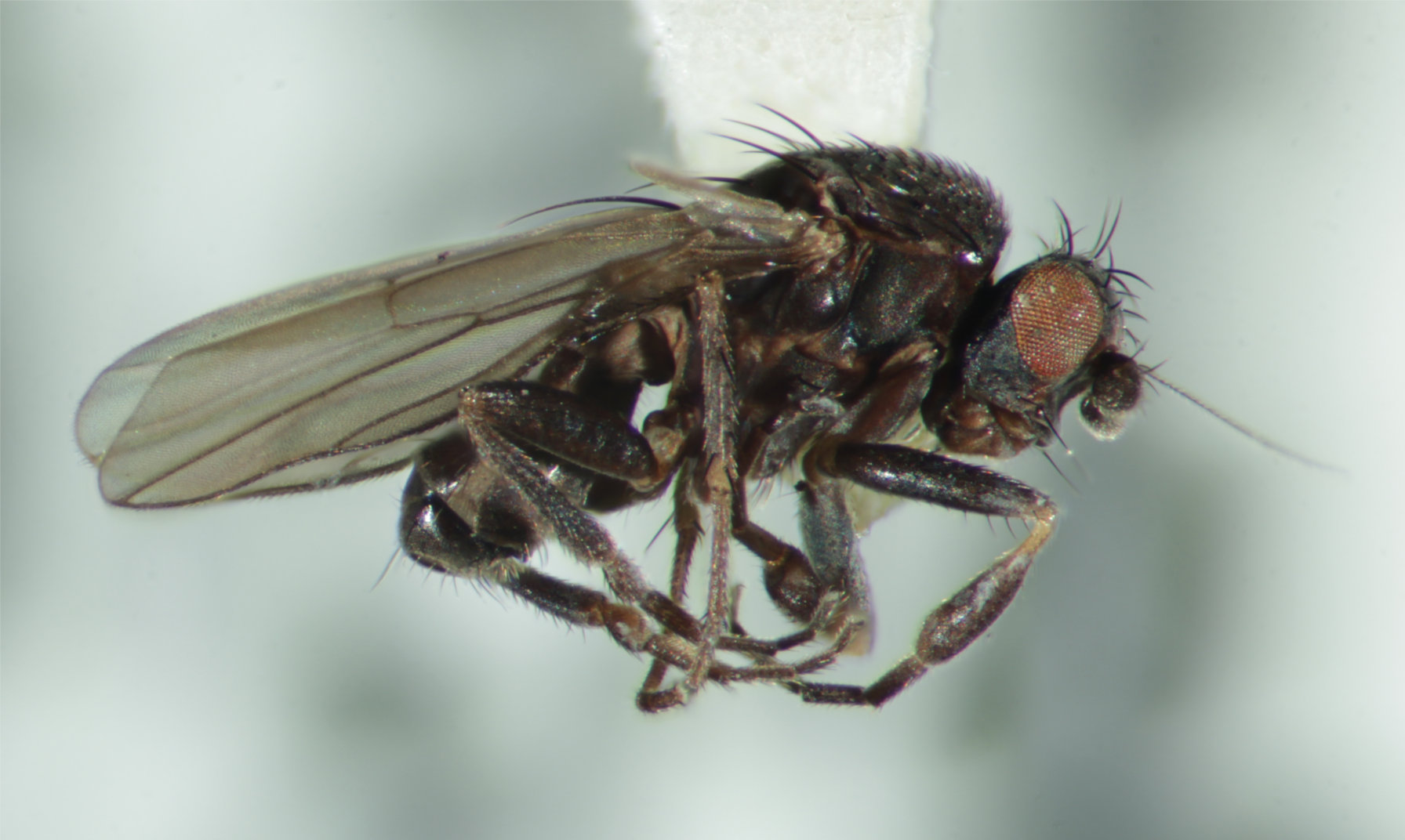

Scientific classification
- Kingdom: Animalia
- Phylum: Arthropoda
- Class: Insecta
- Order: Diptera
- Family: Sphaeroceridae
- Genus: Spelobia
- Species: S. talparum

Binomial name
- Spelobia talparum (Richards, 1927)

Synonyms
- Limosina talparum Richards, 1927

= Spelobia talparum =

Species of fly

Spelobia talparum is a species of fly in the family Sphaeroceridae.

== Distribution ==
Afghanistan, Andorra, Austria, Belgium, Bulgaria, Czech Republic, Denmark, Finland, France, Germany, Great Britain, Hungary, Ireland, Italy, Latvia, Lithuania, Norway, Portugal, Russia, Slovakia, Spain, Sweden, Switzerland, Ukraine.
