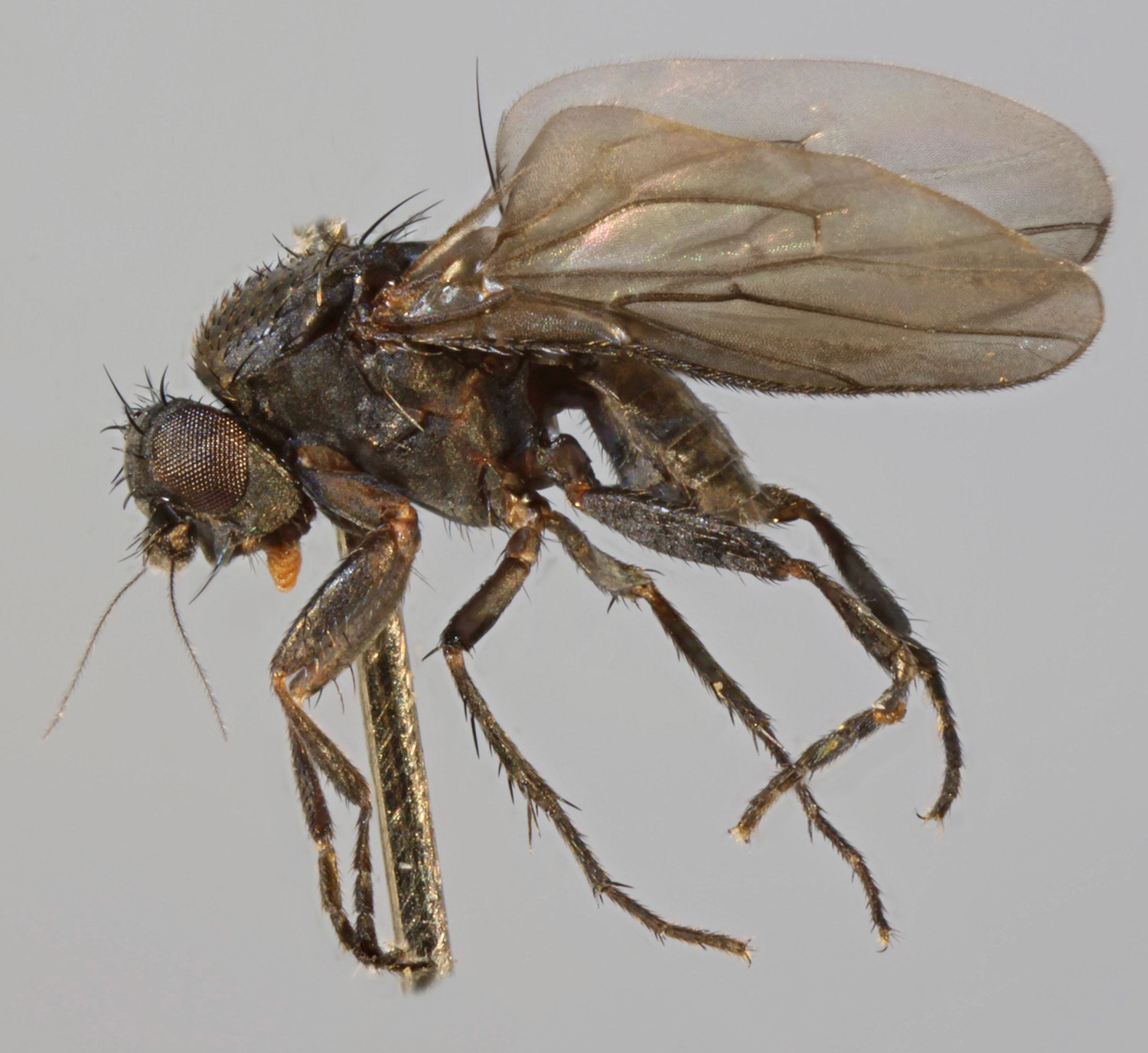

Scientific classification
- Kingdom: Animalia
- Phylum: Arthropoda
- Class: Insecta
- Order: Diptera
- Family: Sphaeroceridae
- Genus: Spelobia
- Species: S. baezi

Binomial name
- Spelobia baezi (Papp, 1977)

Synonyms
- Limosina baezi Papp, 1977

= Spelobia baezi =

Species of fly

Spelobia baezi is a species of fly in the family Sphaeroceridae.

== Distribution ==
Andorra, Canary Islands, Cyprus, France, Great Britain, Ireland, Italy, Lebanon, Morocco, Spain, Tunisia.
