= Spelobia ochripes =

Scientific classification
- Kingdom: Animalia
- Phylum: Arthropoda
- Class: Insecta
- Order: Diptera
- Family: Sphaeroceridae
- Genus: Spelobia
- Species: S. ochripes

Binomial name
- Spelobia ochripes (Meigen, 1830)

Synonyms
- Borborus ochripes Meigen, 1830

Species of fly

Spelobia ochripes is a species of lesser dung fly (insects in the family Sphaeroceridae).
