= Spelobia maculipennis =

Scientific classification
- Kingdom: Animalia
- Phylum: Arthropoda
- Class: Insecta
- Order: Diptera
- Family: Sphaeroceridae
- Genus: Spelobia
- Species: S. maculipennis

Binomial name
- Spelobia maculipennis (Spuler, 1925)

Synonyms
- Leptocera maculipennis Spuler, 1925

Species of fly

Spelobia maculipennis is a species of lesser dung flies (insects in the family Sphaeroceridae).
