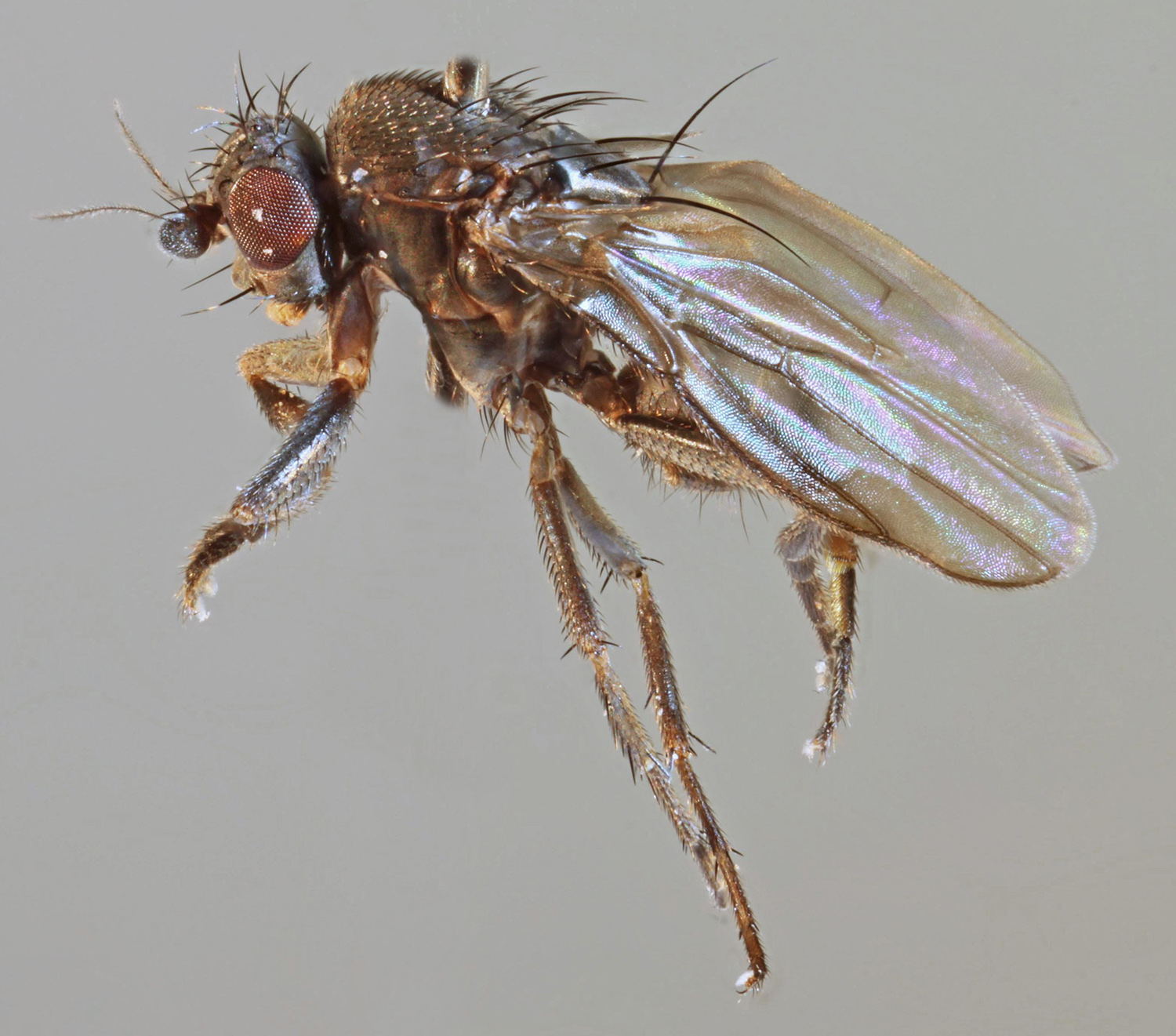

Scientific classification
- Kingdom: Animalia
- Phylum: Arthropoda
- Class: Insecta
- Order: Diptera
- Family: Sphaeroceridae
- Genus: Spelobia
- Species: S. palmata

Binomial name
- Spelobia palmata (Richards, 1927)

Synonyms
- Limosina palmata Richards, 1927; Limosina leruthi Duda, 1938

= Spelobia palmata =

Species of fly

Spelobia palmata is a species of fly in the family Sphaeroceridae.

== Distribution ==
Andorra, Austria, Belgium, Bulgaria, Croatia, Czech Republic, Denmark, Faeroe Islands, Finland, France, Germany, Great Britain, Greece, Hungary, Ireland, Italy, Norway, Roumania, Russia, Slovakia, Spain, Sweden, Switzerland, Tunisia.
