= List of Limoniid genera =

The large fly family Limoniidae is paraphyletic and presently contains about 155 genera:

Subfamily Chioneinae Rondani 1861

Amphineurus Skuse, 1890
Aphrophila Edwards, 1923
Arctoconopa Alexander, 1955
Atarba Osten Sacken, 1869
Aymaramyia Alexander, 1943
Baeoura Alexander, 1924
Beringomyia Savchenko, 1980
Cheilotrichia Rossi, 1848
Chionea Dalman, 1816
Cladura Osten Sacken, 1860
Crypteria Bergroth, 1913
Cryptolabis Osten Sacken, 1860
Dasymallomyia Brunetti, 1911
Ellipteroides Becker, 1907
Empedomorpha Alexander, 1916
Erioconopa Stary, 1976
Erioptera Meigen, 1803
Eriopterella Alexander, 1929
Eriopterodes Alexander, 1970
Eugnophomyia Alexander, 1947
Gnophomyia Osten Sacken, 1860
Gonempeda Alexander, 1924
Gonomyia Meigen, 1818
Gonomyodes Alexander, 1948
Gonomyopsis Alexander, 1966
Gymnastes Brunetti, 1911
Hesperoconopa Alexander, 1948
Hoplolabis Osten Sacken, 1869
Horistomyia Alexander, 1924
Hovamyia Alexander, 1951
Hoverioptera Alexander, 1963
Idiocera Dale, 1842
Idiognophomyia Alexander, 1956
Ilisia Rondani, 1856
Jivaromyia Alexander, 1943
Limnophilomyia Alexander, 1921
Maietta Alexander, 1929
Molophilus Curtis, 1833
Neocladura Alexander, 1920
Neognophomyia Alexander, 1926
Neolimnophila Alexander, 1920
Neophilippiana Alexander, 1964
Ormosia Rondani, 1856
Ozeoura Theischinger & Billingham, 2018
Phantolabis Alexander, 1956
Quathlambia Alexander, 1956
Quechuamyia Alexander, 1943
Rhabdomastix Skuse, 1890
Rhypholophus Kolenati, 1860
Riedelomyia Alexander, 1928
Scleroprocta Edwards, 1938
Sigmatomera Osten Sacken, 1869
Styringomyia Loew, 1845
Symplecta Meigen, 1830
Tasiocera Skuse, 1890
Tasiocerellus Alexander, 1958
Teucholabis Osten Sacken, 1860
Trichotrimicra Alexander, 1921
Unguicrypteria Alexander, 1981

Subfamily Dactylolabinae (Alexander 1920)
Dactylolabis Osten Sacken, 1860
Subfamily Limnophilinae Bigot 1854

Acantholimnophila Alexander, 1924
Adelphomyia Bergroth, 1891
Afrolimnophila Alexander, 1956
Alfredia Bezzi, 1918
Austrolimnophila Alexander, 1920
Bergrothomyia Alexander, 1928
Chilelimnophila Alexander, 1968
Clydonodozus Enderlein, 1912
Conosia van der Wulp, 1880
Ctenolimnophila Alexander, 1921
Dicranophragma Osten Sacken, 1860
Diemenomyia Alexander, 1928
Edwardsomyia Alexander, 1929
Eloeophila Rondani, 1856
Epiphragma Osten Sacken, 1860
Euphylidorea Alexander, 1972
Eupilaria Alexander, 1932
Eutonia van der Wulp, 1874
Grahamomyia Alexander, 1935
Gynoplistia Westwood, 1835
Harrisomyia Alexander, 1923
Heterolimnophila Alexander, 1924
Hexatoma Latreille, 1809
Idioptera Macquart, 1834
Lecteria Osten Sacken, 1888
Leolimnophila Theischinger, 1996
Limnophila Macquart, 1834
Limnophilella Alexander, 1919
Medleromyia Alexander, 1974
Mesolimnophila Alexander, 1929
Metalimnophila Alexander, 1922
Minipteryx Theischinger, 2015
Neolimnomyia Seguy, 1937
Nippolimnophila Alexander, 1930
Notholimnophila Alexander, 1924
Nothophila Alexander, 1922
Oxyrhiza de Meijere, 1946
Paradelphomyia Alexander, 1936
Paralimnophila Alexander, 1921
Phylidorea Bigot, 1854
Phyllolabis Osten Sacken, 1877
Pilaria Sintenis, 1889
Polymera Wiedemann, 1821
Prionolabis Osten Sacken, 1860
Prolimnophila Alexander, 1929
Pseudolimnophila Alexander, 1919
Rhamphophila Edwards, 1923
Shannonomyia Alexander, 1929
Skuseomyia Alexander, 1924
Taiwanomyia Alexander, 1923
Tinemyia Hutton, 1900
Tipulimnoea Theischinger, 1996
Tonnoiraptera Alexander, 1935
Tonnoirella Alexander, 1928
Ulomorpha Osten Sacken, 1869
Zaluscodes Lamb, 1909
Zelandomyia Alexander, 1923

Subfamily Limoniinae Speiser 1909

Achyrolimonia Alexander, 1965
Amphilimnobia Alexander, 1920
Antocha Osten Sacken, 1860
Araucoxenia Alexander, 1969
Atypophthalmus Brunetti, 1911
Collessophila Theischinger, 1994
Dapanoptera Westwood, 1881
Degeneromyia Alexander, 1956
Dicranomyia Stephens, 1829
Dicranoptycha Osten Sacken, 1860
Discobola Osten Sacken, 1865
Elephantomyia Osten Sacken, 1860
Elliptera Schiner, 1863
Geranomyia Haliday, 1833
Helius Lepeletier & Serville, 1828
Lechria Skuse, 1890
Libnotes Westwood, 1876
Limnorimarga Alexander, 1945
Limonia Meigen, 1803
Lipsothrix Loew, 1873
Metalimnobia Matsumura, 1911
Neolimonia Alexander, 1964
Orimarga Osten Sacken, 1869
Orosmya Rondani, 1856
Pelosia Rondani, 1856
Platylimnobia Alexander, 1917
Protohelius Alexander, 1928
Rhipidia Meigen, 1818
Spyloptera Rondani, 1856
Taiwanina Alexander, 1928
Thaumastoptera Mik, 1866
Thrypticomyia Skuse, 1890
Tipulina Motschulsky, 1859
Tonnoiromyia Alexander, 1926
Toxorhina Loew, 1850
Trentepohlia Bigot, 1854
Trichoneura Loew, 1850
Xenolimnobia Alexander, 1926
