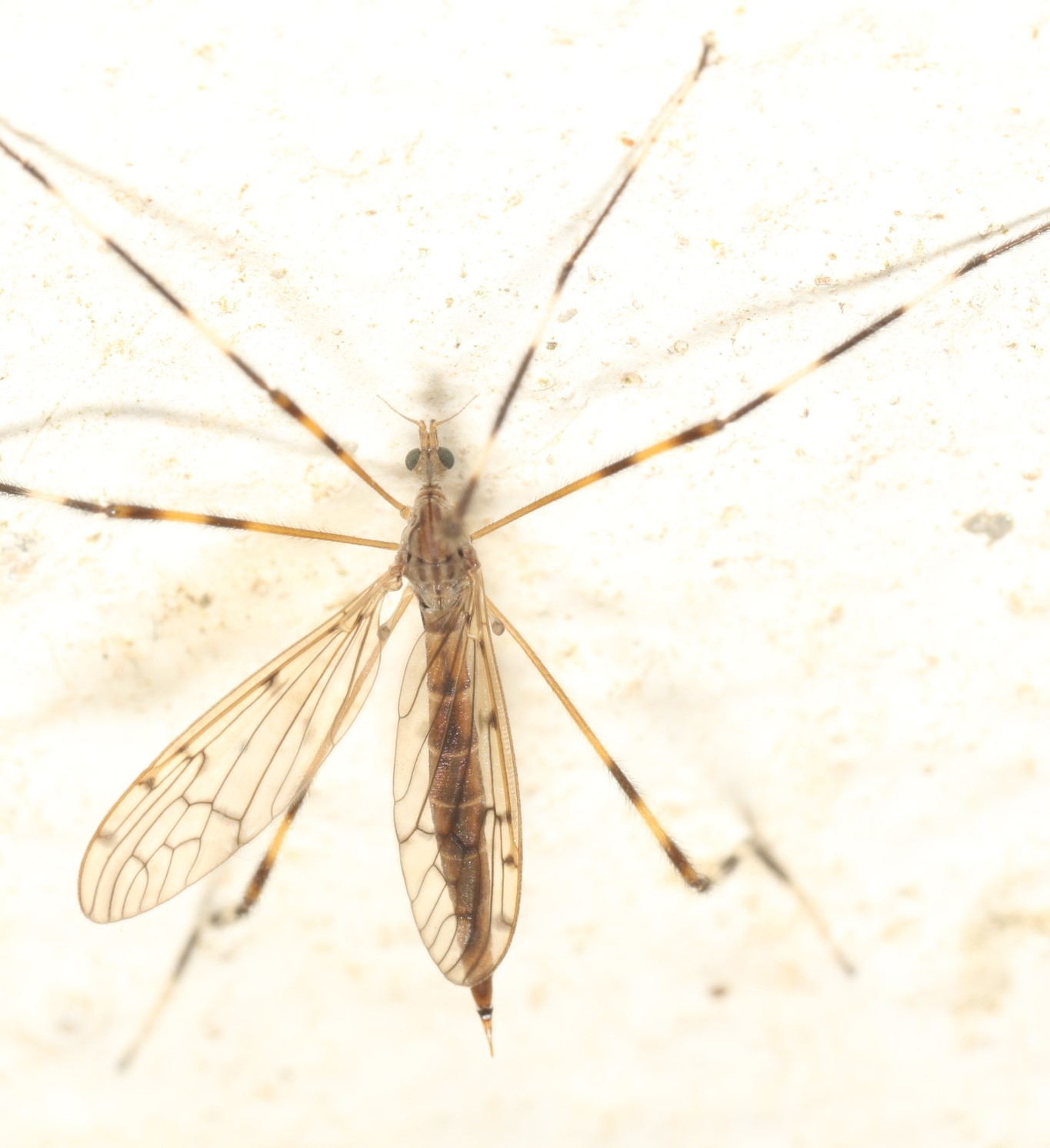
- Lecteria mattogrossae

Scientific classification
- Kingdom: Animalia
- Phylum: Arthropoda
- Class: Insecta
- Order: Diptera
- Family: Limoniidae
- Subfamily: Limnophilinae
- Genus: Lecteria; Osten Sacken, 1888

Type species
- Tipula armillaris Fabricius, 1805

Subgenera
- Lecteria Osten Sacken, 1888; Neolecteria Alexander, 1934; Psaronius Enderlein, 1912

= Lecteria =

Genus of flies

Lecteria is a genus of crane flies in the family Limoniidae.

== Distribution ==
Africa & South America

== Species ==
- Subgenus Lecteria Osten Sacken

- L. acanthosoma Alexander, 1969
- L. acanthostyla Alexander, 1969
- L. africana africana Alexander, 1920
- L. africana nigrilinea Alexander, 1920
- L. armillaris (Fabricius, 1805)
- L. atricauda Alexander, 1920
- L. bicornuta Alexander, 1969
- L. calopus (Walker, 1856)
- L. cetrata Alexander, 1969
- L. duchaillui Alexander, 1923
- L. fuscitarsis Alexander, 1969
- L. hirsutipes Riedel, 1920
- L. laticincta Alexander, 1920
- L. machadoi Alexander, 1963
- L. mattogrossae Alexander, 1913
- L. metatarsalba Alexander, 1920
- L. microcephala (Bigot, 1858)
- L. pluriguttata Alexander, 1920
- L. radialis Alexander, 1956
- L. reisi Alexander, 1921
- L. retrorsa Alexander, 1969
- L. simplex Alexander, 1969
- L. simpsoni Alexander, 1920
- L. tanganicae Alexander, 1921
- L. tibialis Alexander, 1923
- L. triacanthos Alexander, 1920
- L. uniarmillata Alexander, 1956
- L. upsilon Alexander, 1969
- L. vasta Alexander, 1921

- Subgenus Neolecteria Alexander, 1934

- L. bipunctata Edwards, 1926

- Subgenus Psaronius Enderlein, 1912

- L. abnormis Alexander, 1914
- L. brevisector Alexander, 1936
- L. brevitibia (Alexander, 1920)
- L. fuscipennis (Alexander, 1914)
- L. legata Alexander, 1948
- L. manca (Alexander, 1921)
- L. obliterata Alexander, 1913
- L. obscura (Fabricius, 1805)
- L. pallipes (Alexander, 1920)
- L. pygmaea (Alexander, 1914)
- L. triangulifera (Alexander, 1921)
