= Taiwanomyia =

Scientific classification
- Kingdom: Animalia
- Phylum: Arthropoda
- Class: Insecta
- Order: Diptera
- Family: Limoniidae
- Subfamily: Limnophilinae
- Genus: Taiwanomyia; Alexander, 1923

Type species
- Tasiocera fragilicornis Riedel, 1917

Species
- see text

Synonyms
- Troglophila Brunetti, 1924; Esakiomyia Alexander, 1957

Genus of flies

Taiwanomyia is a genus of crane fly in the family Limoniidae.

== Distribution ==
Malaysia, Japan, India, Philippines, Thailand, China, Papua New Guinea & Taiwan

== Species ==
- T. alticola (Edwards, 1926)
- T. babaella Alexander, 1957
- T. brevicornis Alexander, 1967
- T. brevissima Alexander, 1967
- T. cavernicola (Brunetti, 1924)
- T. cotabatoensis (Alexander, 1934)
- T. filicornis (Alexander, 1924)
- T. fragilicornis (Riedel, 1917)
- T. hispivena Alexander, 1967
- T. inobsepta Alexander, 1970
- T. lativertex (Alexander, 1950)
- T. perpendicularis (Alexander, 1954)
- T. perretracta (Alexander, 1954)
- T. pollosta Alexander, 1967
- T. ritozanensis (Alexander, 1929)
- T. seticornis (Alexander, 1926)
- T. setulosa Alexander, 1967
- T. sicula Alexander, 1967
- T. szechwanensis (Alexander, 1933)
- T. tafana (Alexander, 1947)
