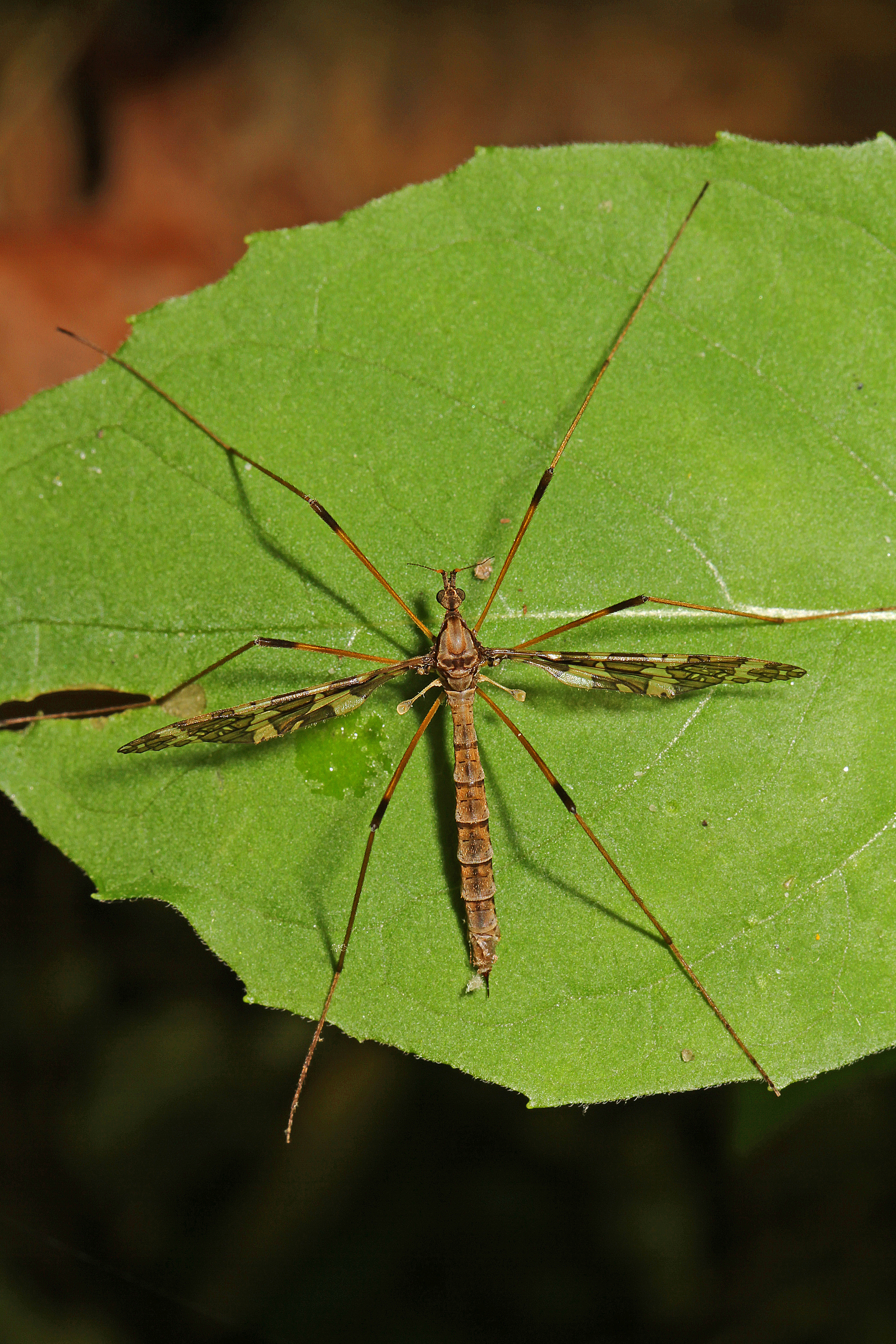
- Epiphragma fasciapenne

Scientific classification
- Kingdom: Animalia
- Phylum: Arthropoda
- Class: Insecta
- Order: Diptera
- Family: Limoniidae
- Subfamily: Hexatominae
- Tribe: Hexatomini

= Hexatomini =

Tribe of flies

Hexatomini is a tribe of limoniid crane flies in the family Limoniidae. There are about 16 genera and at least 250 described species in Hexatomini.

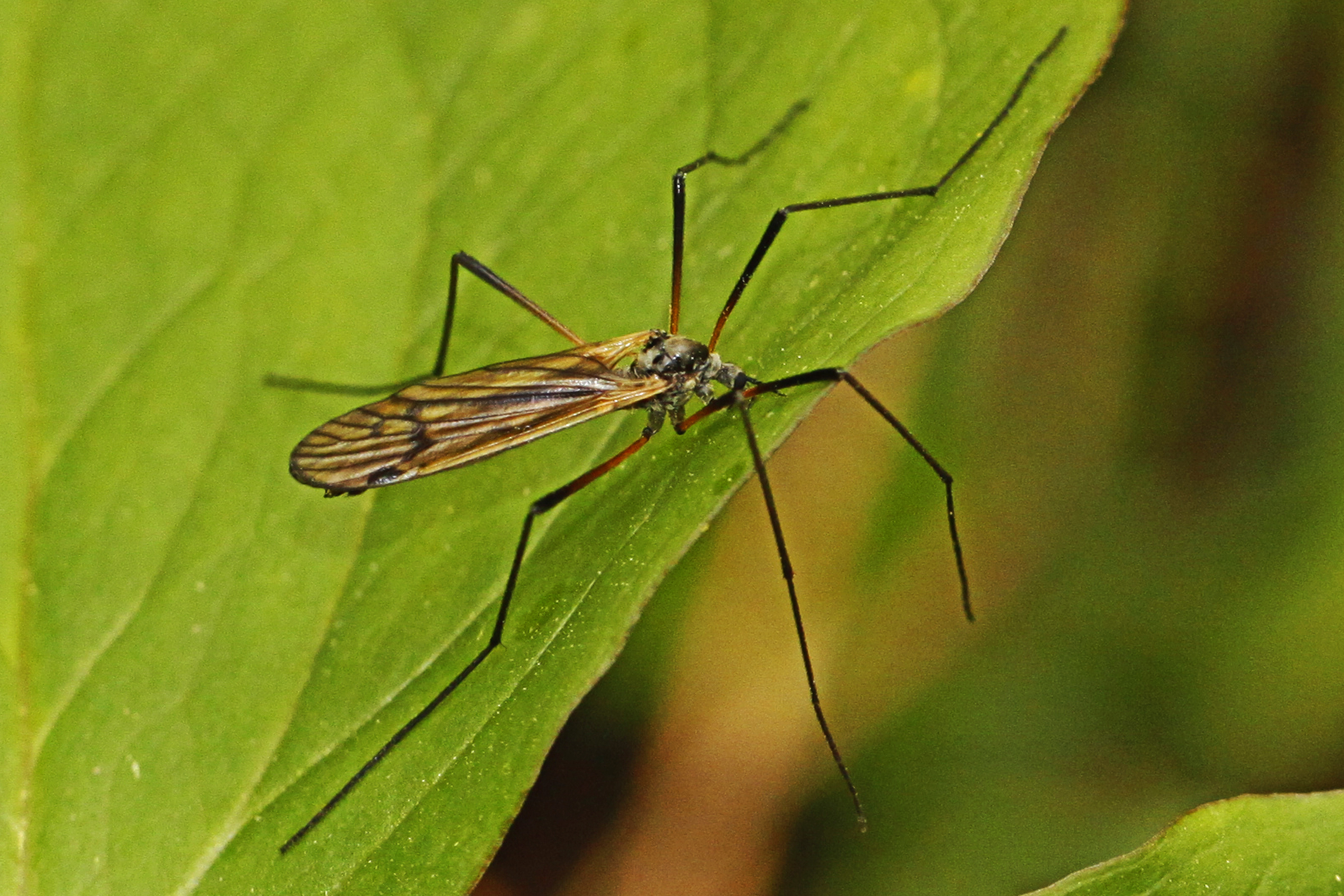
Limnophila rufibasis

== Genera ==
- Atarba Osten-sacken, 1869
- Austrolimnophila Alexander, 1920
- Dactylolabis
- Elephantomyia Osten-sacken, 1859
- Epiphragma Osten-sacken, 1859
- Euphylidorea
- Hexatoma Latreille, 1809
- Limnophila Macquart, 1834
- Paradelphomyia Alexander, 1936
- Phyllolabis
- Pilaria Sintenis, 1889
- Polymera
- Prolimnophila
- Pseudolimnophila
- Shannonomyia
- Ulomorpha
