= Prionolabis =

Scientific classification
- Kingdom: Animalia
- Phylum: Arthropoda
- Class: Insecta
- Order: Diptera
- Family: Limoniidae
- Subfamily: Limnophilinae
- Genus: Prionolabis; Osten Sacken, 1860

Type species
- Limnophila rufibasis Osten Sacken, 1860

Species
- see text

Genus of flies

Prionolabis is a genus of crane fly in the family Limoniidae.

== Species ==
- P. acanthophora (Alexander, 1938)
- P. acutistylus (Alexander, 1925)
- P. antennata (Coquillett, 1905)
- P. astans Stary, 1982
- P. atrofemorata (Alexander, 1954)
- P. auribasis (Alexander, 1918)
- P. barberi (Alexander, 1916)
- P. boharti (Alexander, 1943)
- P. carbonis (Alexander, 1938)
- P. clavaria (Alexander, 1950)
- P. cognata (Lackschewitz, 1940)
- P. coracina (Alexander, 1964)
- P. cressoni (Alexander, 1917)
- P. dis (Alexander, 1950)
- P. extensa (Alexander, 1958)
- P. fletcheri (Senior-White, 1922)
- P. fokiensis (Alexander, 1941)
- P. freeborni (Alexander, 1943)
- P. gruiformis (Alexander, 1945)
- P. habrosyne (Alexander, 1970)
- P. harukonis (Alexander, 1934)
- P. hepatica (Alexander, 1919)
- P. hospes (Egger, 1863)
- P. imanishii (Alexander, 1932)
- P. indistincta (Doane, 1900)
- P. inermis (Alexander, 1934)
- P. inopis (Alexander, 1970)
- P. isis (Alexander, 1958)
- P. iyoensis (Alexander, 1955)
- P. kingdonwardi (Alexander, 1963)
- P. kunimiana (Alexander, 1969)
- P. lictor (Alexander, 1940)
- P. liponeura (Alexander, 1930)
- P. lipophleps (Alexander, 1930)
- P. longeantennata (Strobl, 1910)
- P. luteibasalis (Alexander, 1934)
- P. majorina (Alexander, 1958)
- P. mecocera (Alexander, 1964)
- P. mendli Savchenko, 1983
- P. munda (Osten Sacken, 1869)
- P. mundoides (Alexander, 1916)
- P. neomunda (Alexander, 1925)
- P. nigrilunae (Tokunaga, 1935)
- P. nigronitida (Edwards, 1921)
- P. odai (Alexander, 1933)
- P. oregonensis (Alexander, 1940)
- P. oritropha (Alexander, 1928)
- P. paramunda (Alexander, 1949)
- P. pilosula (Alexander, 1936)
- P. poliochroa (Alexander, 1940)
- P. politissima (Alexander, 1941)
- P. recurvans (Alexander, 1953)
- P. rudimentis (Alexander, 1941)
- P. rufibasis (Osten Sacken, 1860)
- P. rufipennis (Alexander, 1919)
- P. scaria (Alexander, 1945)
- P. schmidi Stary, 2006
- P. sequoiarum (Alexander, 1943)
- P. serridentata (Alexander, 1930)
- P. shikokuana (Alexander, 1953)
- P. simplex (Alexander, 1911)
- P. sounkyana (Alexander, 1934)
- P. subcognata Savchenko, 1971
- P. submunda (Alexander, 1918)
- P. terebrans (Alexander, 1916)
- P. uncinata (Alexander, 1954)
- P. vancouverensis (Alexander, 1943)
- P. walleyi (Alexander, 1929)
- P. yamamotana (Alexander, 1938)
- P. yankovskyana (Alexander, 1940)
