= Nothophila =

Scientific classification
- Kingdom: Animalia
- Phylum: Arthropoda
- Clade: Pancrustacea
- Class: Insecta
- Order: Diptera
- Family: Limoniidae
- Subfamily: Limnophilinae
- Genus: Nothophila; Alexander, 1922

Type species
- Nothophila fuscana Edwards, 1922

Species
- see text

Genus of flies

Nothophila is a genus of crane fly in the family Limoniidae.

== Distribution ==
New Zealand.

== Species ==
- N. fuscana Edwards, 1922
- N. nebulosa Edwards, 1922
