= Eupilaria =

Scientific classification
- Kingdom: Animalia
- Phylum: Arthropoda
- Class: Insecta
- Order: Diptera
- Family: Limoniidae
- Subfamily: Limnophilinae
- Genus: Eupilaria; Alexander, 1932

Type species
- Pilaria phoenosoma Alexander, 1931

Species
- See text

Genus of flies

Eupilaria is a genus of crane fly in the family Limoniidae.

== Species ==
- E. albicans (Edwards, 1933)
- E. annulipes (Brunetti, 1918)
- E. auranticolor (Alexander, 1932)
- E. guttulifera Alexander, 1949
- E. incana Alexander, 1949
- E. inconsequens (Brunetti, 1918)
- E. leucopeza Alexander, 1972
- E. leucopoda (Alexander, 1931)
- E. melanoptera Alexander, 1972
- E. nigeriana Alexander, 1972
- E. opaca (de Meijere, 1911)
- E. phoenosoma (Alexander, 1931)
- E. singhalica Alexander, 1958
- E. suavis Alexander, 1949
- E. taprobanica Alexander, 1958
- E. thurmani Alexander, 1953
- E. thysanotos Alexander, 1958
- E. uma Alexander, 1962
- E. varaha Alexander, 1956
