= Neolimnomyia =

Scientific classification
- Kingdom: Animalia
- Phylum: Arthropoda
- Class: Insecta
- Order: Diptera
- Family: Limoniidae
- Subfamily: Limnophilinae
- Genus: Neolimnomyia; Séguy, 1937

Type species
- Neolimnomyia sylvestris Séguy, 1937

Species
- see text

Genus of flies

Neolimnomyia is a genus of crane fly in the family Limoniidae.

== Distribution ==
Europe & Africa

== Species ==
- N. baluba (Alexander, 1963)
- N. batava (Edwards, 1938)
- N. filata (Walker, 1856)
- N. fumivena (Alexander, 1956)
- N. hetaira (Alexander, 1956)
- N. natalica (Alexander, 1956)
- N. prospera (Alexander, 1956)
- N. ranavalona (Alexander, 1965)
- N. suffilata (Alexander, 1946)
- N. tributa (Alexander, 1956)
