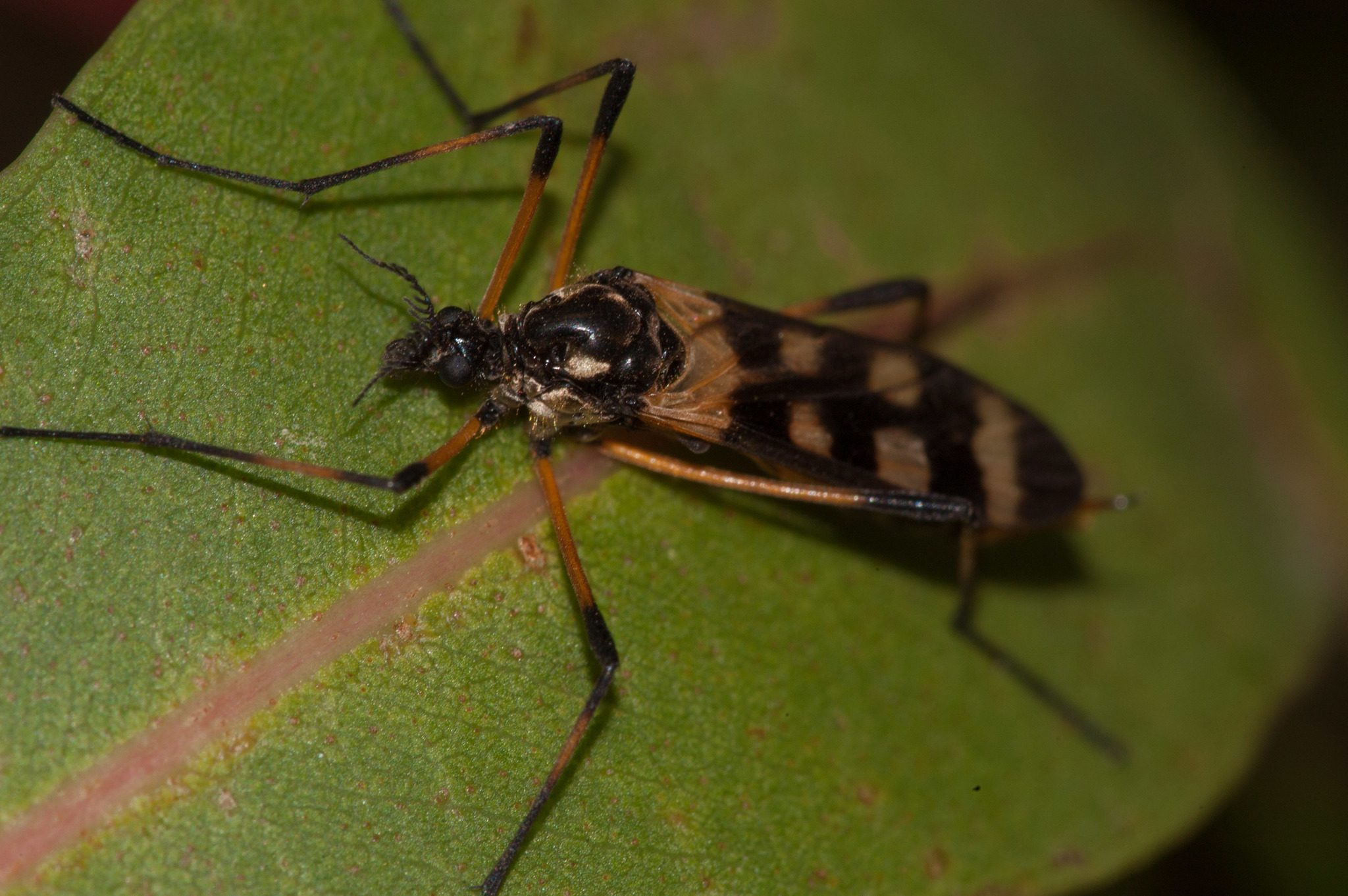
- Gynoplistia bella

Scientific classification
- Domain: Eukaryota
- Kingdom: Animalia
- Phylum: Arthropoda
- Class: Insecta
- Order: Diptera
- Family: Limoniidae
- Subfamily: Limnophilinae
- Genus: Gynoplistia; Brunetti, 1911

Type species
- Gynoplistia nervosa Westwood, 1835 [= vilis (Walker, 1835)]

Subgenera
- Cerozodia Westwood, 1835; Dirhipis Enderlein, 1917; Gynoplistia Westwood, 1835; Xenolimnophila Alexander, 1922

Synonyms
- Gymnoplistia

= Gynoplistia =

Genus of flies

Gynoplistia is a genus of crane fly in the family Limoniidae.

== Species ==
- Subgenus Cerozodia Westwood, 1835

- G. hemiptera (Alexander, 1922)
- G. interrupta (Westwood, 1835)
- G. laticosta Alexander, 1930
- G. paradisea (Edwards, 1923)
- G. plumosa (Osten Sacken, 1888)
- G. pulverulenta (Edwards, 1923)

- Subgenus Dirhipis Enderlein, 1917

- G. flavipennis (Philippi, 1866)
- G. fusca (Jaennicke, 1867)
- G. longiramus Alexander, 1969
- G. luteola Alexander, 1971
- G. pictipennis (Philippi, 1866)
- G. riedeliana (Enderlein, 1917)
- G. salgadoi Alexander, 1971
- G. striatipennis Alexander, 1928

- Subgenus Gynoplistia Westwood, 1835

- G. achlys Alexander, 1959
- G. aculeata Alexander, 1924
- G. aequidentata Alexander, 1971
- G. albicincta Edwards, 1923
- G. albizonata Alexander, 1938
- G. alice Theischinger, 1993
- G. alpigena Alexander, 1929
- G. ambulator Alexander, 1924
- G. angustipennis Edwards, 1924
- G. annulata Westwood, 1835
- G. anthracina Alexander, 1920
- G. apicalis Walker, 1856
- G. argyropleura Alexander, 1930
- G. arthuriana Edwards, 1923
- G. atripes Alexander, 1924
- G. attrita Alexander, 1936
- G. aurantiocincta Alexander, 1930
- G. aurantiopyga Alexander, 1922
- G. babinda Theischinger, 1993
- G. basispinosa Alexander, 1978
- G. basitarsalba Alexander, 1971
- G. basituberosa Alexander, 1978
- G. bella (Walker, 1835)
- G. biangri Theischinger, 1993
- G. biarmata Alexander, 1931
- G. bickeli Theischinger, 1993
- G. bicolor (Philippi, 1866)
- G. bidentata Alexander, 1922
- G. bilobata Alexander, 1923
- G. bimaculata Skuse, 1890
- G. bipunctata (Philippi, 1866)
- G. biroana Alexander, 1934
- G. bispica Alexander, 1960
- G. bituberculata Alexander, 1923
- G. bona Alexander, 1920
- G. boomerang Theischinger, 1993
- G. brassi Alexander, 1960
- G. bucera Alexander, 1923
- G. campbelli Alexander, 1922
- G. canterburiana Edwards, 1923
- G. capreolus Theischinger, 1993
- G. chadwicki Theischinger, 1993
- G. chalybeata Alexander, 1947
- G. chalybicolor Alexander, 1930
- G. chathamica Alexander, 1924
- G. cladophora Alexander, 1922
- G. clarkeana Alexander, 1951
- G. clarki Alexander, 1930
- G. clavipes Edwards, 1923
- G. collessi Theischinger, 1994
- G. concava Alexander, 1922
- G. conchyliata Alexander, 1971
- G. conjuncta Edwards, 1923
- G. costospilota Alexander, 1971
- G. cultrata Alexander, 1928
- G. cuprea Hutton, 1900
- G. cyanea Westwood, 1835
- G. cyanoceps Alexander, 1960
- G. dactylophora Alexander, 1926
- G. davidsoni Alexander, 1929
- G. decacantha Alexander, 1960
- G. digitifera Alexander, 1953
- G. dilatata Alexander, 1924
- G. dileuca Alexander, 1947
- G. dimidiata Alexander, 1922
- G. dispila Alexander, 1923
- G. dispiloides Alexander, 1926
- G. distinctissima Alexander, 1930
- G. dixantha Alexander, 1948
- G. doddi Alexander, 1921
- G. drekurmi Theischinger, 1993
- G. echionis Alexander, 1959
- G. elaphus Theischinger, 1993
- G. elnorae Alexander, 1929
- G. eluta Alexander, 1923
- G. erinundra Theischinger, 1993
- G. erythrina Alexander, 1930
- G. evelynae Alexander, 1947
- G. exornata Alexander, 1929
- G. fergusoniana Alexander, 1924
- G. fimbriata Alexander, 1920
- G. flavipes Theischinger, 1993
- G. flavizona Alexander, 1948
- G. flavofemorata Alexander, 1928
- G. flavohalterata Alexander, 1926
- G. forceps Alexander, 1931
- G. formosa Hutton, 1900
- G. frazieri Theischinger, 1993
- G. fulgens Hutton, 1900
- G. fulva Theischinger, 1993
- G. fulviceps Walker, 1861
- G. fulviventris Alexander, 1922
- G. fumipennis Walker, 1856
- G. fuscoplumbea Edwards, 1923
- G. galbraithae Alexander, 1929
- G. generosa Alexander, 1926
- G. gilvipennis Alexander, 1928
- G. gingera Theischinger, 1993
- G. glauca Edwards, 1923
- G. gloriosa Alexander, 1978
- G. gnamma Theischinger, 1993
- G. habbemae Alexander, 1959
- G. hamiltoni Alexander, 1924
- G. harrisi Alexander, 1922
- G. heighwayi Alexander, 1930
- G. hera Alexander, 1959
- G. heroni Alexander, 1929
- G. hiemalis (Alexander, 1923)
- G. hirsuticauda Alexander, 1923
- G. hirtamera Alexander, 1922
- G. histrionica Alexander, 1928
- G. hotooworry Theischinger, 1993
- G. howensis Skuse, 1890
- G. hyalinata Alexander, 1923
- G. hylonympha Alexander, 1929
- G. illcha Theischinger, 1993
- G. incisa Edwards, 1923
- G. inconjuncta Alexander, 1926
- G. inflata Alexander, 1926
- G. insolita Walker, 1865
- G. isolata Theischinger, 1993
- G. jocosa Alexander, 1962
- G. jucunda Osten Sacken, 1881
- G. jucundella Alexander, 1948
- G. jurgiosa Walker, 1858
- G. kaoota Theischinger, 1993
- G. kiandra Theischinger, 1993
- G. klamonoensis Alexander, 1951
- G. krangalang Theischinger, 1993
- G. kraussiana Alexander, 1978
- G. kua Theischinger, 1993
- G. kundy Theischinger, 1993
- G. latibasalis Alexander, 1951
- G. leai (Alexander, 1922)
- G. leptacantha Alexander, 1959
- G. leto Alexander, 1959
- G. leucopeza Alexander, 1929
- G. lieftinckiana Alexander, 1951
- G. lobulifera Alexander, 1923
- G. longifurcula Alexander, 1959
- G. lowanna Theischinger, 1993
- G. luteibasis Alexander, 1922
- G. luteicincta Alexander, 1924
- G. luteoannulata Alexander, 1936
- G. lyrifera Alexander, 1922
- G. magnifica Edwards, 1923
- G. manicata Alexander, 1929
- G. marpanye Theischinger, 1993
- G. melancholica Walker, 1864
- G. melanopyga Schiner, 1868
- G. melape Theischinger, 1993
- G. metajucunda Alexander, 1960
- G. moanae Alexander, 1951
- G. moma Theischinger, 1993
- G. monozostera Alexander, 1960
- G. moundi Theischinger, 1999
- G. murdiella Theischinger, 1993
- G. myersae Alexander, 1924
- G. narkale Theischinger, 1993
- G. neboissi Theischinger, 1993
- G. nebulipennis Alexander, 1922
- G. nebulosa Edwards, 1923
- G. nematomera Alexander, 1926
- G. neojucunda Alexander, 1948
- G. neonebulosa Alexander, 1923
- G. ngende Theischinger, 1993
- G. nicholsoni Alexander, 1928
- G. nigripennis Alexander, 1926
- G. nigrithorax Alexander, 1923
- G. nigriventris Alexander, 1948
- G. nigrobimbo Alexander, 1923
- G. nigronitida Edwards, 1923
- G. niveicincta Alexander, 1922
- G. nivicola Alexander, 1959
- G. notabilis Alexander, 1926
- G. notata Edwards, 1923
- G. novempectinata Alexander, 1934
- G. obscurivena Skuse, 1890
- G. occipitalis de Meijere, 1913
- G. ocellifera Alexander, 1923
- G. octofasciata Brunetti, 1911
- G. ofarrelli Theischinger, 1993
- G. opima Alexander, 1928
- G. orophila Edwards, 1923
- G. otagana Alexander, 1930
- G. pallidicosta Alexander, 1931
- G. pallidistigma Alexander, 1923
- G. paluma Theischinger, 1993
- G. parajucunda Alexander, 1960
- G. patruelis Alexander, 1924
- G. pedestris Edwards, 1923
- G. penana Alexander, 1967
- G. peramoena Alexander, 1959
- G. perjucunda Riedel, 1921
- G. persephoneia Theischinger, 1993
- G. philpotti Alexander, 1939
- G. pleuralis Alexander, 1923
- G. plumbeicolor Alexander, 1959
- G. poenghana Theischinger, 1993
- G. polita Edwards, 1923
- G. polycantha Alexander, 1959
- G. postica Alexander, 1929
- G. princeps Alexander, 1923
- G. pygmaea Alexander, 1923
- G. quagga Theischinger, 1993
- G. recurvata Alexander, 1923
- G. resecta Edwards, 1924
- G. resplendens Alexander, 1951
- G. rieki Theischinger, 1993
- G. romae Alexander, 1930
- G. rubribasis Alexander, 1960
- G. sackeni Alexander, 1920
- G. schachovskoyana Alexander, 1960
- G. scimitar Alexander, 1936
- G. sculpturata Alexander, 1929
- G. serrulata Alexander, 1926
- G. siebersi Edwards, 1927
- G. skusei Alexander, 1926
- G. speciosa Edwards, 1923
- G. speighti Edwards, 1923
- G. spinicalcar Alexander, 1922
- G. spinigera Alexander, 1922
- G. splendens Alexander, 1922
- G. subclavipes Alexander, 1924
- G. subfasciata Walker, 1848
- G. subformosa Alexander, 1924
- G. subimmaculata Alexander, 1922
- G. subobsoleta Alexander, 1923
- G. tenuifilosa Alexander, 1931
- G. tenuistylus Alexander, 1929
- G. tergogibbosa Alexander, 1971
- G. tigris Theischinger, 1994
- G. tillyardi Alexander, 1929
- G. tooronga Theischinger, 1993
- G. toxopei Alexander, 1960
- G. tridactyla Edwards, 1923
- G. trifasciata Edwards, 1923
- G. trispinosa Alexander, 1922
- G. tristillata Alexander, 1929
- G. troglophila Alexander, 1962
- G. tuberculata Edwards, 1923
- G. umbacoora Theischinger, 1993
- G. unimaculata Alexander, 1922
- G. uwinnia Theischinger, 1993
- G. variabilis Alexander, 1929
- G. variata Alexander, 1931
- G. variicalcarata Alexander, 1929
- G. varipes Alexander, 1929
- G. vigilans Alexander, 1951
- G. vilis (Walker, 1835)
- G. violacea Edwards, 1923
- G. viridis Macquart, 1838
- G. viridithorax Skuse, 1890
- G. vittinervis Alexander, 1924
- G. waigeuensis Alexander, 1947
- G. waitakerensis Alexander, 1952
- G. wakefieldi Westwood, 1881
- G. weiri Theischinger, 1994
- G. wilhelmina Alexander, 1959
- G. williamsi Theischinger, 2000
- G. williamsiana Alexander, 1945
- G. wilsonella Alexander, 1930
- G. womba Theischinger, 1993
- G. woombye Theischinger, 1993
- G. xanthocera Alexander, 1947
- G. yanka Theischinger, 1993
- G. yarra Theischinger, 1993
- G. yarrumba Theischinger, 1993
- G. yonguldye Theischinger, 1993
- G. zebrata Alexander, 1930

- Subgenus Xenolimnophila Alexander, 1922

- G. fergusoni (Alexander, 1923)
- G. flindersi Alexander, 1931
- G. paketye Theischinger, 1993
- G. tubrabucca Theischinger, 1993
- G. zaluscodes (Alexander, 1922)
