= Conosia =

Scientific classification
- Kingdom: Animalia
- Phylum: Arthropoda
- Class: Insecta
- Order: Diptera
- Family: Limoniidae
- Subfamily: Limnophilinae
- Genus: Conosia van der Wulp, 1880

Type species
- Limnobia irrorata Wiedemann, 1828

Species
- See text

Genus of flies

Conosia is a genus of crane fly in the family Limoniidae.

== Species ==
- C. angustissima Alexander, 1927
- C. insularis Alexander, 1942
- C. irrorata (Wiedemann, 1828)
- C. malagasya Alexander, 1921
- C. minuscula Alexander, 1958
- C. minusculoides Alexander, 1975
- C. principalis Edwards, 1934
- C. thomensis Edwards, 1934
