= Clydonodozus =

Scientific classification
- Kingdom: Animalia
- Phylum: Arthropoda
- Clade: Pancrustacea
- Class: Insecta
- Order: Diptera
- Family: Limoniidae
- Subfamily: Limnophilinae
- Genus: Clydonodozus; Enderlein, 1912

Type species
- C. multistriatus Enderlein, 1912

Species
- See text

Genus of flies

Clydonodozus is a genus of crane fly in the family Limoniidae.

== Species ==
- C. abyssinicus Alexander, 1972
- C. alexanderi Lindner, 1958
- C. angustifasciatus Alexander, 1920
- C. brevicellulus Alexander, 1920
- C. cinereithorax Alexander, 1930
- C. curvinervis Edwards, 1931
- C. fulvithorax Alexander, 1926
- C. fumicostatus Alexander, 1930
- C. griseiceps de Meijere, 1916
- C. guttatipennis (Karsch, 1888)
- C. interruptus Alexander, 1920
- C. multistriatus Enderlein, 1912
- C. neavei Alexander, 1920
- C. nilgiricus Alexander, 1953
- C. pallens (van der Wulp, 1885)
- C. pallidistigma Alexander, 1920
- C. phaeosoma Alexander, 1970
- C. puncticosta Alexander, 1920
- C. punctulatus Enderlein, 1912
- C. scalaris Alexander, 1963
- C. schoutedeni Alexander, 1930
- C. stuckenbergi Alexander, 1957
- C. xanthopterus Alexander, 1938
