= Leolimnophila =

Scientific classification
- Kingdom: Animalia
- Phylum: Arthropoda
- Clade: Pancrustacea
- Class: Insecta
- Order: Diptera
- Family: Limoniidae
- Subfamily: Limnophilinae
- Genus: Leolimnophila; Theischinger, 1996

Type species
- Limnophila pantherina Alexander, 1922

Species
- see text

Genus of flies

Leolimnophila is a genus of crane flies in the family Limoniidae.

== Distribution ==
Australia.

== Species ==
- L. pantherina (Alexander, 1922)
- L. tigris Theischinger, 1996
