= Grahamomyia =

Scientific classification
- Kingdom: Animalia
- Phylum: Arthropoda
- Class: Insecta
- Order: Diptera
- Family: Limoniidae
- Subfamily: Limnophilinae
- Genus: Grahamomyia; Alexander, 1935

Type species
- Grahamomyia bicellula Alexander, 1935

Species
- See text

Genus of flies

Grahamomyia is a genus of crane fly in the family Limoniidae. There is only one known species.

== Distribution ==
Sichuan, China.

== Species ==
- G. bicellula Alexander, 1935
