= Quechuamyia =

Scientific classification
- Kingdom: Animalia
- Phylum: Arthropoda
- Class: Insecta
- Order: Diptera
- Family: Limoniidae
- Subfamily: Chioneinae
- Genus: Quechuamyia; Alexander, 1943

Type species
- Quechuamyia phantasma Alexander, 1943

Species
- see text

Genus of flies

Quechuamyia is a genus of crane fly in the family Limoniidae.

== Distribution ==
Ecuador.

== Species ==
- Q. phantasma Alexander, 1943
