= Edwardsomyia =

Scientific classification
- Kingdom: Animalia
- Phylum: Arthropoda
- Class: Insecta
- Order: Diptera
- Family: Limoniidae
- Subfamily: Limnophilinae
- Genus: Edwardsomyia; Alexander, 1929

Type species
- Edwardsomyia chiloensis Alexander, 1929

Species
- See text

Genus of flies

Edwardsomyia is a genus of crane fly in the family Limoniidae.

== Distribution ==
Chile.

== Species ==
- E. chiloensis Alexander, 1929
