= Harrisomyia =

Scientific classification
- Kingdom: Animalia
- Phylum: Arthropoda
- Clade: Pancrustacea
- Class: Insecta
- Order: Diptera
- Family: Limoniidae
- Subfamily: Limnophilinae
- Genus: Harrisomyia; Alexander, 1923

Type species
- Harrisomyia bicuspidata Alexander, 1923

Species
- See text

Genus of flies

Harrisomyia is a genus of crane fly in the family Limoniidae.

== Distribution ==
New Zealand.

== Species ==
- H. bicuspidata Alexander, 1923
- H. terebrella Alexander, 1932
