= Aymaramyia =

Scientific classification
- Kingdom: Animalia
- Phylum: Arthropoda
- Class: Insecta
- Order: Diptera
- Family: Limoniidae
- Subfamily: Chioneinae
- Genus: Aymaramyia; Alexander, 1943

Type species
- Aymaramyia dubia Alexander, 1943

Species
- seet text

Genus of flies

Aymaramyia is a genus of crane fly, Tipuloidea, in the family Limoniidae. There is only one known species.

== Distribution ==
Peru

== Species ==
- Aymaramyia dubia Alexander, 1943
