= Mesolimnophila =

Scientific classification
- Kingdom: Animalia
- Phylum: Arthropoda
- Class: Insecta
- Order: Diptera
- Family: Limoniidae
- Subfamily: Limnophilinae
- Genus: Mesolimnophila; Alexander, 1929

Type species
- Polymoria lutea Philippi, 1866

Species
- see text

Synonyms
- Polymoria Philippi, 1866; Polypraesidia Miller, 1945.

Genus of flies

Mesolimnophila is a genus of crane fly in the family Limoniidae.

== Distribution ==
Chile.

== Species ==
- M. hirsutipes Alexander, 1929
- M. lutea (Philippi, 1866)
