= Tonnoiraptera =

Scientific classification
- Kingdom: Animalia
- Phylum: Arthropoda
- Clade: Pancrustacea
- Class: Insecta
- Order: Diptera
- Family: Limoniidae
- Subfamily: Limnophilinae
- Genus: Tonnoiraptera; Alexander, 1935

Type species
- Alexandrella neozelandica Tonnoir, 1926

Species
- see text

Synonyms
- Alexandrella Tonnoir, 1926; Alexandrotipula Miller, 1945

Genus of flies

Tonnoiraptera is a genus of crane fly in the family Limoniidae.

== Distribution ==
New Zealand.

== Species ==
- T. neozelandica (Tonnoir, 1926)
