= Trichoneura (fly) =

Scientific classification
- Kingdom: Animalia
- Phylum: Arthropoda
- Class: Insecta
- Order: Diptera
- Family: Limoniidae
- Subfamily: Limnophilinae
- Genus: Trichoneura

Genus of flies

Trichoneura is a genus of crane fly in the family Limoniidae.
