= Rhamphophila =

Scientific classification
- Kingdom: Animalia
- Phylum: Arthropoda
- Clade: Pancrustacea
- Class: Insecta
- Order: Diptera
- Family: Limoniidae
- Subfamily: Limnophilinae
- Genus: Rhamphophila; Edwards, 1923

Type species
- Tipula obscuripennis Hudson, 1895 [= sinistra (Hutton, 1900)]

Species
- see text

Genus of flies

Rhamphophila is a genus of crane fly in the family Limoniidae.

== Distribution ==
New Zealand.

== Species ==
- R. lyrifera Edwards, 1923
- R. sinistra (Hutton, 1900)
