= Empedomorpha =

Scientific classification
- Kingdom: Animalia
- Phylum: Arthropoda
- Class: Insecta
- Order: Diptera
- Family: Limoniidae
- Subfamily: Chioneinae
- Genus: Empedomorpha; Alexander, 1916

Type species
- Trimicra empedoides Alexander, 1916

Species
- See text

Genus of flies

Empedomorpha is a genus of crane fly in the family Limoniidae.

== Distribution ==
North America.

== Species ==
- E. apacheana (Alexander, 1946)
- E. empedoides (Alexander, 1916)
