= Heterolimnophila =

Scientific classification
- Kingdom: Animalia
- Phylum: Arthropoda
- Class: Insecta
- Order: Diptera
- Family: Limoniidae
- Subfamily: Limnophilinae
- Genus: Heterolimnophila; Alexander, 1924

Type species
- Limnophila truncata Alexander, 1922

Species
- see text

Genus of flies

Heterolimnophila is a genus of crane fly in the family Limoniidae.

== Distribution ==
New Zealand.

== Species ==
- H. subtruncata (Alexander, 1923)
- H. truncata (Alexander, 1922)
