= Idioptera =

Scientific classification
- Kingdom: Animalia
- Phylum: Arthropoda
- Class: Insecta
- Order: Diptera
- Family: Limoniidae
- Subfamily: Limnophilinae
- Genus: Idioptera; Macquart, 1834

Type species
- Idioptera maculata Macquart, 1834 [= pulchella (Meigen, 1830)]

Species
- see text

Genus of flies

Idioptera is a genus of crane fly in the family Limoniidae.

== Distribution ==
Europe & North America.

== Species ==
- I. fasciolata (Osten Sacken, 1869)
- I. linnei Oosterbroek, 1992
- I. mcclureana (Alexander, 1938)
- I. nearctica (Alexander, 1966)
- I. pulchella (Meigen, 1830)
