= Metalimnophila =

Scientific classification
- Kingdom: Animalia
- Phylum: Arthropoda
- Clade: Pancrustacea
- Class: Insecta
- Order: Diptera
- Family: Limoniidae
- Subfamily: Limnophilinae
- Genus: Metalimnophila; Alexander, 1922

Type species
- Limnophila howesi Alexander, 1922

Species
- see text

Genus of crane flies

Metalimnophila is a genus of crane fly in the family Limoniidae.

== Distribution ==
New Zealand.

== Species ==
- M. alpina Alexander, 1926
- M. apicispina (Alexander, 1923)
- M. greyana Alexander, 1926
- M. greyensis (Alexander, 1925)
- M. howesi (Alexander, 1922)
- M. integra Alexander, 1926
- M. longi Alexander, 1952
- M. mirifica (Alexander, 1922)
- M. montivaga Alexander, 1926
- M. nemocera (Alexander, 1923)
- M. nigroapicata (Alexander, 1922)
- M. palmata Alexander, 1932
- M. penicillata (Alexander, 1922)
- M. productella Alexander, 1926
- M. protea Alexander, 1926
- M. simplicis (Alexander, 1922)
- M. spissigrada (Alexander, 1926)
- M. unipuncta (Alexander, 1922)
- M. yorkensis Alexander, 1926
