= Notholimnophila =

Scientific classification
- Kingdom: Animalia
- Phylum: Arthropoda
- Clade: Pancrustacea
- Class: Insecta
- Order: Diptera
- Family: Limoniidae
- Subfamily: Limnophilinae
- Genus: Notholimnophila; Alexander, 1924

Type species
- Philippiana exclusa Alexander, 1922

Species
- see text

Genus of flies

Notholimnophila is a genus of crane fly in the family Limoniidae.

== Distribution ==
New Zealand.

== Species ==
- N. exclusa (Alexander, 1922)
