= Ctenolimnophila =

Scientific classification
- Kingdom: Animalia
- Phylum: Arthropoda
- Class: Insecta
- Order: Diptera
- Family: Limoniidae
- Subfamily: Limnophilinae
- Genus: Ctenolimnophila; Alexander, 1921

Type species
- C. bivena Alexander, 1921

Species
- Abitagua Alexander, 1944; Campbellomyia Alexander, 1925; Ctenolimnophila Alexander, 1921

Genus of flies

Ctenolimnophila is a genus of crane flies in the family Limoniidae.

== Species ==
- Subgenus Abitagua Alexander, 1944
  - C. longifusa Alexander, 1944
- Subgenus Campbellomyia Alexander, 1925
  - C. alpina (Alexander, 1922)
  - C. brevitarsis (Alexander, 1926)
  - C. harrisiana (Alexander, 1924)
  - C. madagascariensis Alexander, 1960
  - C. neolimnophiloides Alexander, 1942
  - C. paulistae Alexander, 1943
  - C. severa Alexander, 1943
  - C. venustipennis (Alexander, 1925)
- Subgenus Ctenolimnophila Alexander, 1921
  - C. bivena Alexander, 1921
  - C. decisa (Alexander, 1914)
  - C. fuscoanalis Alexander, 1946
