= Degeneromyia =

Scientific classification
- Kingdom: Animalia
- Phylum: Arthropoda
- Class: Insecta
- Order: Diptera
- Family: Limoniidae
- Subfamily: Limoniinae
- Genus: Degeneromyia; Alexander, 1956

Type species
- D. thais Alexander, 1956

Species
- See text

Genus of flies

Degeneromyia is a genus of crane fly in the family Limoniidae. There is only one known species.

== Distribution ==
It is endemic to Fiji.

== Species ==
- D. thais (Alexander, 1956)
