= Nippolimnophila =

Scientific classification
- Kingdom: Animalia
- Phylum: Arthropoda
- Class: Insecta
- Order: Diptera
- Family: Limoniidae
- Subfamily: Limnophilinae
- Genus: Nippolimnophila; Alexander, 1930

Type species
- Nippolimnophila kiusiuensis Alexander, 1930

Species
- see text

Genus of flies

Nippolimnophila is a genus of crane fly in the family Limoniidae.

== Distribution ==
Japan.

== Species ==
- N. kiusiuensis Alexander, 1930
- N. omogiana Alexander, 1955
- N. perproducta Alexander, 1957
- N. yakushimensis Alexander, 1930
