= Hovamyia =

Scientific classification
- Kingdom: Animalia
- Phylum: Arthropoda
- Class: Insecta
- Order: Diptera
- Family: Limoniidae
- Subfamily: Chioneinae
- Genus: Hovamyia; Alexander, 1951

Type species
- Gonomyia monilifera Alexander, 1920

Species
- see text

Genus of insects

Hovamyia is a genus of crane fly in the family Limoniidae.

== Distribution ==
Madagascar, Comoros, Cameroon, Mozambique, Nigeria, Sierra Leone, Uganda & Zimbabwe.

== Species ==
- H. apicistyla Alexander, 1961
- H. armillata (Enderlein, 1912)
- H. immaculipes Alexander, 1955
- H. jacentia Alexander, 1951
- H. monilifera (Alexander, 1920)
- H. polyperiscelis Alexander, 1960
- H. subarmillata Alexander, 1979
- H. suffuscipes Alexander, 1951
- H. venustipes (Alexander, 1920)
