= Eriopterodes =

Scientific classification
- Kingdom: Animalia
- Phylum: Arthropoda
- Class: Insecta
- Order: Diptera
- Family: Limoniidae
- Subfamily: Chioneinae
- Genus: Eriopterodes; Alexander, 1970

Type species
- Erioptera celestis Alexander, 1940

Species
- See text

Genus of insects

Eriopterodes is a genus of crane fly in the family Limoniidae.

== Distribution ==
Ecuador, Venezuela, Dominica & Mexico.

== Species ==
- E. celestis (Alexander, 1940)
- E. laetipleura (Alexander, 1938)
