= Skuseomyia =

Scientific classification
- Kingdom: Animalia
- Phylum: Arthropoda
- Clade: Pancrustacea
- Class: Insecta
- Order: Diptera
- Family: Limoniidae
- Subfamily: Limnophilinae
- Genus: Skuseomyia; Alexander, 1924

Type species
- Skuseomyia eximia Alexander, 1924

Species
- see text

Genus of flies

Skuseomyia is a genus of crane fly in the family Limoniidae.

== Distribution ==
Queensland & New South Wales, Australia.

== Species ==
- S. eximia (Osten Sacken, 1860)
