= Trichotrimicra =

Scientific classification
- Kingdom: Animalia
- Phylum: Arthropoda
- Class: Insecta
- Order: Diptera
- Family: Limoniidae
- Subfamily: Chioneinae
- Genus: Trichotrimicra; Alexander, 1921

Type species
- Trimicra hirtipennis Alexander, 1921

Species
- see text

Genus of flies

Trichotrimicra is a genus of crane fly in the family Limoniidae.

== Distribution ==
South Africa, Kenya, Uganda, Nigeria, Congo and Rwanda

== Species ==
- T. antilopa (Alexander, 1960)
- T. flavidella Alexander, 1972
- T. hirtipennis (Alexander, 1921)
- T. majuscula (Alexander, 1956)
- T. medleri Alexander, 1974
- T. rectangula Alexander, 1975
- T. subnuda (Alexander, 1956)
- T. tchaka (Alexander, 1960)
- T. vanstraeleni (Alexander, 1956)
