= Limnophilella =

Scientific classification
- Kingdom: Animalia
- Phylum: Arthropoda
- Clade: Pancrustacea
- Class: Insecta
- Order: Diptera
- Family: Limoniidae
- Subfamily: Limnophilinae
- Genus: Limnophilella; Alexander, 1919

Type species
- Limnophila epiphragmoides Alexander, 1913

Species
- see text

Genus of flies

Limnophilella is a genus of crane flies in the family Limoniidae.

== Distribution ==
Ecuador, Peru, Brazil, Argentina, Chile, Panama & New Zealand.

== Species ==
- L. delicatula (Hutton, 1900)
- L. diversipes (Alexander, 1921)
- L. epiphragmoides (Alexander, 1913)
- L. inquieta (Alexander, 1943)
- L. mantissa (Alexander, 1966)
- L. multipicta (Alexander, 1939)
- L. patagonica Alexander, 1928
- L. retractior Alexander, 1928
- L. schunkeana (Alexander, 1948)
- L. serotina (Alexander, 1922)
- L. subvictor (Alexander, 1948)
- L. victor (Alexander, 1919)
