= Diemenomyia =

Scientific classification
- Kingdom: Animalia
- Phylum: Arthropoda
- Clade: Pancrustacea
- Class: Insecta
- Order: Diptera
- Family: Limoniidae
- Subfamily: Limnophilinae
- Genus: Diemenomyia; Alexander, 1928

Type species
- Diemenomyia bulbosa Alexander, 1928

Species
- See text

Genus of flies

Diemenomyia is a genus of crane fly in the family Limoniidae.There are only two known species.

== Distribution ==
Both known species are from Tasmania, Australia.

== Species ==
- D. bulbosa Alexander, 1928
- D. praetenuis Alexander, 1928
