= Chilelimnophila =

Scientific classification
- Kingdom: Animalia
- Phylum: Arthropoda
- Class: Insecta
- Order: Diptera
- Family: Limoniidae
- Subfamily: Limnophilinae
- Genus: Chilelimnophila; Alexander, 1968

Type species
- Limnophila lyra Alexander, 1952

Species
- See text

Genus of flies

Chilelimnophila is a genus of crane fly in the family Limoniidae. There is only one known species.

== Distribution ==
This genus, and single species, is found only in Chile.

== Species ==
- L. lyra Alexander, 1952
