= Bergrothomyia =

Scientific classification
- Kingdom: Animalia
- Phylum: Arthropoda
- Class: Insecta
- Order: Diptera
- Family: Limoniidae
- Subfamily: Limnophilinae
- Genus: Bergrothomyia; Alexander, 1928

Type species
- Limnophila rostrifera Skuse, 1890

Species
- See text

Genus of flies

Bergrothomyia is an Australian genus of crane fly in the family Limoniidae.

== Species ==
- B. diemenensis Alexander, 1928
- B. rostrifera (Skuse, 1890)
- B. tregellasi Alexander, 1931
