= Zelandomyia =

Scientific classification
- Kingdom: Animalia
- Phylum: Arthropoda
- Clade: Pancrustacea
- Class: Insecta
- Order: Diptera
- Family: Limoniidae
- Subfamily: Limnophilinae
- Genus: Zelandomyia; Alexander, 1923

Type species
- Zelandomyia pygmaea Alexander, 1923

Species
- see text

Genus of flies

Zelandomyia is a genus of crane flies in the family Limoniidae.

== Distribution ==
New Zealand & Chile.

== Species ==
- Z. angusta (Alexander, 1923)
- Z. armigera (Alexander, 1945)
- Z. atridorsum Alexander, 1932
- Z. cinereipleura (Alexander, 1922)
- Z. deviata (Alexander, 1922)
- Z. otagensis (Alexander, 1923)
- Z. pallidula Alexander, 1924
- Z. penthoptera Alexander, 1924
- Z. pygmaea Alexander, 1923
- Z. ruapehuensis (Alexander, 1922)
- Z. tantula Alexander, 1926
- Z. watti (Alexander, 1922)
