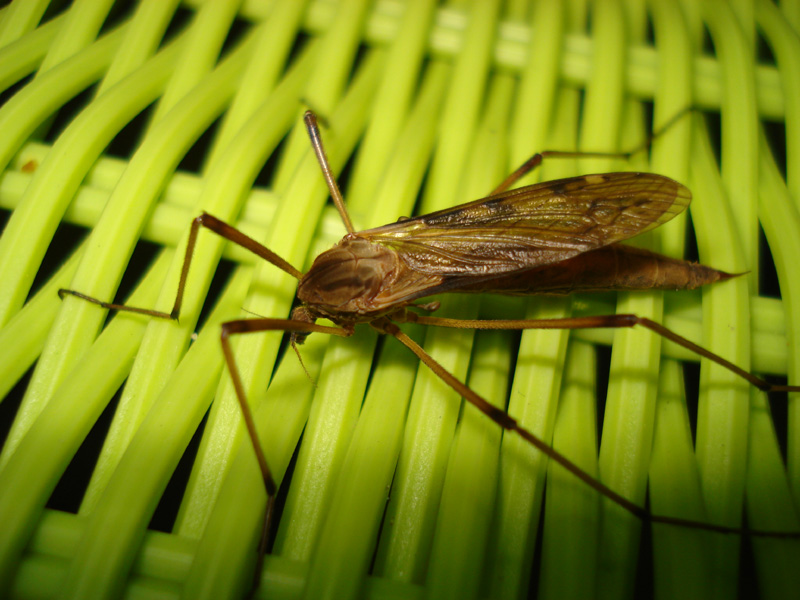
- Eutonia barbipes

Scientific classification
- Kingdom: Animalia
- Phylum: Arthropoda
- Class: Insecta
- Order: Diptera
- Family: Limoniidae
- Subfamily: Limnophilinae
- Genus: Eutonia van der Wulp, 1874

Type species
- Limonia barbipes Meigen, 1804

Species
- See text

= Eutonia =

Genus of flies

"Eutonia" (or Eutony / Eutonie/ Eutoni) is a genus of crane fly in the family Limoniidae.

== Species ==
- E. alleni (Johnson, 1909)
- E. barbipes (Meigen, 1804)
- E. marchandi (Alexander, 1916)
- E. phorophragma (Alexander, 1944)
- E. satsuma (Westwood, 1876)
