= Hoverioptera =

Scientific classification
- Kingdom: Animalia
- Phylum: Arthropoda
- Class: Insecta
- Order: Diptera
- Family: Limoniidae
- Subfamily: Chioneinae
- Genus: Hoverioptera; Alexander, 1963

Type species
- Erioptera ambricola Alexander, 1951

Subgenera
- Hoverioptera Alexander, 1963; Tesserioptera Mendl & Geiger, 1992

Genus of flies

Hoverioptera is a genus of crane fly in the family Limoniidae.

== Distribution ==
Madagascar, Comoros & Switzerland.

== Species ==
- Subgenus Hoverioptera Alexander, 1963

- H. ambricola (Alexander, 1951)

- Subgenus Tesserioptera Mendl & Geiger, 1992

- H. pilosa Mendl & Geiger, 1992
