= Limnophilomyia =

Scientific classification
- Kingdom: Animalia
- Phylum: Arthropoda
- Class: Insecta
- Order: Diptera
- Family: Limoniidae
- Subfamily: Chioneinae
- Genus: Limnophilomyia; Alexander, 1921

Type species
- Limnophila lacteitarsis Alexander, 1921

Subgenera
- Eulimnophilomyia Alexander, 1964; Limnophilomyia Alexander, 1921

Genus of flies

Limnophilomyia is a genus of crane flies in the family Limoniidae.

== Distribution ==
All are from Africa south of the Sahara Desert.

== Species ==
- Subgenus Eulimnophilomyia Alexander, 1964

- L. abnormalis Alexander, 1964

- Subgenus Limnophilomyia Alexander, 1921

- L. edwardsomyia Alexander, 1956
- L. flavidula Alexander, 1976
- L. lacteitarsis (Alexander, 1921)
- L. matengoensis Alexander, 1970
- L. medleriana Alexander, 1976
- L. nigeriensis Alexander, 1974
- L. nigripennis Alexander, 1976
- L. niveipes Alexander, 1956
- L. stuckenbergi Alexander, 1956
- L. transvaalensis Alexander, 1958
