= Tonnoirella =

Scientific classification
- Kingdom: Animalia
- Phylum: Arthropoda
- Clade: Pancrustacea
- Class: Insecta
- Order: Diptera
- Family: Limoniidae
- Subfamily: Limnophilinae
- Genus: Tonnoirella; Alexander, 1928

Type species
- Tonnoirella gemella Alexander, 1928

Species
- see text

Genus of flies

Tonnoirella is a genus of crane fly in the family Limoniidae.

== Distribution ==
Tasmania, Australia.

== Species ==
- T. gemella Alexander, 1928
