= Tipulimnoea =

Scientific classification
- Kingdom: Animalia
- Phylum: Arthropoda
- Clade: Pancrustacea
- Class: Insecta
- Order: Diptera
- Family: Limoniidae
- Subfamily: Limnophilinae
- Genus: Tipulimnoea; Theischinger, 1996

Type species
- Gynoplistia woodhilli Alexander, 1951

Species
- See text

Genus of flies

Tipulimnoea is a genus of crane fly in the family Limoniidae.

== Distribution ==
Australia.

== Species ==
- T. woodhilli (Alexander, 1951)
