= Tasiocerellus =

Scientific classification
- Kingdom: Animalia
- Phylum: Arthropoda
- Class: Insecta
- Order: Diptera
- Family: Limoniidae
- Subfamily: Chioneinae
- Genus: Tasiocerellus; Alexander, 1958

Type species
- Tasiocerellus kandyensis Alexander, 1958

Species
- see text

Genus of flies

Tasiocerellus is a genus of crane fly in the family Limoniidae.

== Distribution ==
Sri Lanka.

== Species ==
- T. kandyensis Alexander, 1958
