= Medleromyia =

Scientific classification
- Kingdom: Animalia
- Phylum: Arthropoda
- Class: Insecta
- Order: Diptera
- Family: Limoniidae
- Subfamily: Limnophilinae
- Genus: Medleromyia; Alexander, 1974

Type species
- Medleromyia nigeriana Alexander, 1974

Species
- see text

Genus of flies

Medleromyia is a genus of crane fly in the family Limoniidae.

== Distribution ==
Nigeria.

== Species ==
- M. destituta Alexander, 1976
- M. nigeriana Alexander, 1974
