= Tinemyia =

Scientific classification
- Kingdom: Animalia
- Phylum: Arthropoda
- Clade: Pancrustacea
- Class: Insecta
- Order: Diptera
- Family: Limoniidae
- Subfamily: Limnophilinae
- Genus: Tinemyia; Hutton, 1900

Type species
- Tinemyia margaritifera Hutton, 1900

Species
- see text

Genus of flies

Tinemyia is a genus of crane fly in the family Limoniidae.

== Distribution ==
New Zealand.

== Species ==
- T. margaritifera Hutton, 1900
