= Aedes oreophilus =

Scientific classification
- Kingdom: Animalia
- Phylum: Arthropoda
- Class: Insecta
- Order: Diptera
- Family: Culicidae
- Genus: Aedes
- Species: A. oreophilus

Binomial name
- Aedes oreophilus (Edwards, 1916)

Synonyms
- Aedes bunanoki Sasa & Ishimura, 1951; Ochlerotatus oreophilus Edwards, 1916

Species of mosquito

Aedes oreophilus is a species of mosquito in the genus Aedes.

This mosquito was first described in 1916 by Frederick Wallace Edwards as Ochlerotatus oreophilus.

Aedes oreophilus is found in both Japan and South Korea.
