= Minipteryx =

Scientific classification
- Kingdom: Animalia
- Phylum: Arthropoda
- Clade: Pancrustacea
- Class: Insecta
- Order: Diptera
- Family: Limoniidae
- Subfamily: Limnophilinae
- Genus: Minipteryx; Theischinger, 2015
- Species: M. robusta

Binomial name
- Minipteryx robusta Theischinger, 2015

Genus of flies

Minipteryx is a genus of crane fly, containing a single species, Minipteryx robusta, which was discovered in Australia in 2015. The species was found in Kosciuszko National Park.
