= Prolimnophila =

Scientific classification
- Kingdom: Animalia
- Phylum: Arthropoda
- Class: Insecta
- Order: Diptera
- Family: Limoniidae
- Subfamily: Limnophilinae
- Genus: Prolimnophila; Alexander, 1929

Type species
- Limnophila areolata Osten Sacken, 1860

Species
- see text

Genus of flies

Prolimnophila is a genus of crane fly in the family Limoniidae.

== Distribution ==
Canada and United States

== Species ==
- P. areolata (Osten Sacken, 1860)
