= Ulomorpha =

Scientific classification
- Kingdom: Animalia
- Phylum: Arthropoda
- Class: Insecta
- Order: Diptera
- Family: Limoniidae
- Subfamily: Limnophilinae
- Genus: Ulomorpha; Osten Sacken, 1869

Type species
- Limnophila pilosella Osten Sacken, 1860

Species
- see text

Genus of flies

Ulomorpha is a genus of crane fly in the family Limoniidae.

== Distribution ==
Canada, United States, North Korea & Japan.

== Species ==
- U. aridela Alexander, 1927
- U. nigricolor Alexander, 1924
- U. nigrodorsalis Alexander, 1949
- U. nigronitida Alexander, 1920
- U. pilosella (Osten Sacken, 1860)
- U. polytricha Alexander, 1930
- U. quinquecellula Alexander, 1920
- U. rogersella Alexander, 1929
- U. sierricola Alexander, 1918
- U. vanduzeei Alexander, 1920
