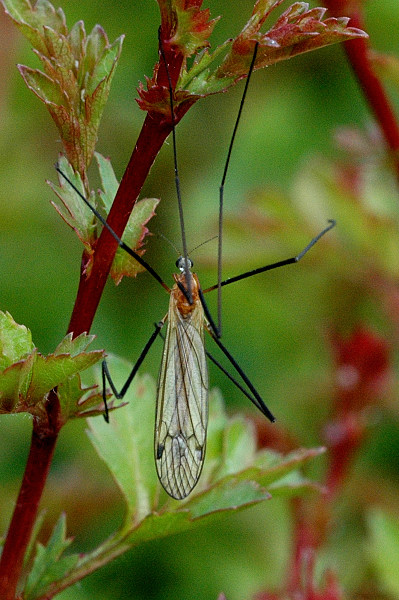
- Austrolimnophila ochracea

Scientific classification
- Kingdom: Animalia
- Phylum: Arthropoda
- Class: Insecta
- Order: Diptera
- Infraorder: Tipulomorpha
- Superfamily: Tipuloidea
- Family: Limoniidae
- Subfamily: Limnophilinae

Tribes
- Epiphragmini; Hexatomini; Limnophilini; Paradelphomyiini; Phyllolabini

Synonyms
- Hexatominae

= Limnophilinae =

Subfamily of flies

The Limnophilinae are a subfamily of limoniid crane flies. Some authors still use the name Hexatominae for this subfamily.

== Genera ==
Limnophilinae contains the following genera:

- Acantholimnophila Alexander, 1924
- Adelphomyia Alexander, 1965
- Afrolimnophila Alexander, 1956
- Alfredia Bezzi, 1918
- Austrolimnophila Alexander, 1920
- Bergrothomyia Alexander, 1928
- Chilelimnophila Alexander, 1968
- Clydonodozus Enderlein, 1912
- Conosia van der Wulp, 1880
- Ctenolimnophila Alexander, 1921
- Dicranophragma Osten Sacken, 1860
- Diemenomyia Alexander, 1928
- Edwardsomyia Alexander, 1929
- Eloeophila Rondani, 1856
- Epiphragma Osten Sacken, 1860
- Euphylidorea Alexander, 1972
- Eupilaria Alexander, 1932
- Eutonia van der Wulp, 1874
- Grahamomyia Alexander, 1935
- Gynoplistia Brunetti, 1911
- Harrisomyia Alexander, 1923
- Heterolimnophila Alexander, 1924
- Hexatoma Latreille, 1809
- Idioptera Macquart, 1834
- Lecteria Osten Sacken, 1888
- Leolimnophila Theischinger, 1996
- Limnophila Macquart, 1834
- Limnophilella Alexander, 1919
- Medleromyia Alexander, 1974
- Mesolimnophila Alexander, 1929
- Metalimnophila Alexander, 1922
- Minipteryx Theischinger, 2015
- Neolimnomyia Séguy, 1937
- Nippolimnophila Alexander, 1930
- Notholimnophila Alexander, 1924
- Nothophila Alexander, 1922
- Oxyrhiza de Meijere, 1946
- Paradelphomyia Alexander, 1936
- Paralimnophila Alexander, 1921
- Phylidorea Bigot, 1854
- Phyllolabis Osten Sacken, 1877
- Pilaria Sintenis, 1889
- Polymera Wiedemann, 1820
- Prionolabis Osten Sacken, 1860
- Prolimnophila Alexander, 1929
- Pseudolimnophila Alexander, 1919
- Rhamphophila Edwards, 1923
- Shannonomyia Alexander, 1929
- Skuseomyia Alexander, 1924
- Taiwanomyia Alexander, 1923
- Tinemyia Hutton, 1900
- Tipulimnoea Theischinger, 1996
- Tonnoiraptera Alexander, 1935
- Tonnoirella Alexander, 1928
- Ulomorpha Osten Sacken, 1869
- Zaluscodes Lamb, 1909
- Zelandomyia Alexander, 1923
