= Zaluscodes =

Scientific classification
- Kingdom: Animalia
- Phylum: Arthropoda
- Clade: Pancrustacea
- Class: Insecta
- Order: Diptera
- Family: Limoniidae
- Subfamily: Limnophilinae
- Genus: Zaluscodes; Lamb, 1909

Type species
- Zaluscodes aucklandicus Lamb, 1909

Species
- see text

Genus of flies

Zaluscodes is a genus of crane fly in the family Limoniidae.

== Distribution ==
New Zealand.

== Species ==
- Z. aucklandicus Lamb, 1909
