= Shannonomyia =

Scientific classification
- Kingdom: Animalia
- Phylum: Arthropoda
- Class: Insecta
- Order: Diptera
- Family: Limoniidae
- Subfamily: Limnophilinae
- Genus: Shannonomyia; Alexander, 1929

Type species
- Limnophila lenta Osten Sacken, 1860

Subgenera
- Roraimomyia Alexander, 1935; hannonomyia Alexander, 1929

Genus of flies

Shannonomyia is a genus of crane fly in the family Limoniidae.

== Species ==
- Subgenus Roraimomyia Alexander, 1935

- S. exilipes Alexander, 1979
- S. permonstrata (Alexander, 1935)

- Subgenus hannonomyia Alexander, 1929

- S. abortiva Alexander, 1967
- S. abra Alexander, 1949
- S. adumbrata Alexander, 1946
- S. aenigmatica Alexander, 1929
- S. antarctica (Walker, 1837)
- S. araguae Alexander, 1947
- S. argenticeps Alexander, 1929
- S. atroapicalis Alexander, 1934
- S. austrolathraea Alexander, 1930
- S. barilochensis Alexander, 1929
- S. batesi Alexander, 1939
- S. bogotensis Alexander, 1938
- S. brevicula Alexander, 1931
- S. brevinervis Alexander, 1929
- S. bruneriana Alexander, 1937
- S. bullockiana (Alexander, 1940)
- S. cacoxena Alexander, 1929
- S. caesia Alexander, 1937
- S. cerbereana Alexander, 1946
- S. cineracea (Philippi, 1866)
- S. cingara Alexander, 1948
- S. congenita (Dietz, 1921)
- S. crassicornis Alexander, 1964
- S. crepera Alexander, 1978
- S. dampfi Alexander, 1939
- S. dilatistyla Alexander, 1971
- S. erubescens Alexander, 1944
- S. evanescens Alexander, 1978
- S. exilifila Alexander, 1980
- S. exilostyla Alexander, 1971
- S. feriata (Alexander, 1929)
- S. fuscostigmalis (Alexander, 1967)
- S. galindoi Alexander, 1978
- S. globulicornis Alexander, 1968
- S. gracilior Alexander, 1944
- S. gurneyana Alexander, 1976
- S. haitensis Alexander, 1939
- S. halterata Alexander, 1967
- S. hoffmani Alexander, 1936
- S. ignava Alexander, 1943
- S. jaffueli Alexander, 1928
- S. justa Alexander, 1937
- S. kuscheli Alexander, 1952
- S. lathraea (Alexander, 1926)
- S. lenitatis Alexander, 1946
- S. lenta (Osten Sacken, 1860)
- S. lentina Alexander, 1928
- S. lentoides (Alexander, 1913)
- S. leonardi Alexander, 1933
- S. lignyptera Alexander, 1978
- S. lipernes Alexander, 1971
- S. longiradialis Alexander, 1929
- S. masatierrae Alexander, 1952
- S. mesophragma Alexander, 1928
- S. mesophragmoides Alexander, 1937
- S. microstyla Alexander, 1971
- S. minutipennis Alexander, 1929
- S. moctezuma Alexander, 1928
- S. multisetosa Alexander, 1979
- S. myersiana Alexander, 1931
- S. nacrea (Alexander, 1913)
- S. nebrioptera Alexander, 1979
- S. neoseclusa Alexander, 1969
- S. nudipennis Alexander, 1964
- S. olssoni (Alexander, 1919)
- S. orophila (Alexander, 1913)
- S. oslari (Alexander, 1916)
- S. ovaliformis Alexander, 1946
- S. paraguayensis Alexander, 1929
- S. parvicellula Alexander, 1968
- S. penumbrosa Alexander, 1940
- S. perreticularis Alexander, 1979
- S. phaeostigmosa Alexander, 1943
- S. phragmophora Alexander, 1937
- S. pomerantzi Alexander, 1964
- S. protuberans Alexander, 1946
- S. providens Alexander, 1950
- S. reticularis Alexander, 1979
- S. roraimensis Alexander, 1935
- S. scaramuzzai Alexander, 1937
- S. seclusa (Alexander, 1928)
- S. selkirkiana Alexander, 1952
- S. semireducta Alexander, 1970
- S. septempunctata Alexander, 1939
- S. setulicornis Alexander, 1971
- S. sopora Alexander, 1944
- S. sparsipunctata Alexander, 1940
- S. sparsissima (Alexander, 1929)
- S. stigmatica (Philippi, 1866)
- S. subexillipes Alexander, 1979
- S. subsopora Alexander, 1979
- S. subumbra Alexander, 1980
- S. torus Alexander, 1979
- S. triangularis (Alexander, 1927)
- S. trichophora Alexander, 1979
- S. tuber (Alexander, 1953)
- S. umbra Alexander, 1948
- S. urophora Alexander, 1970
- S. vocator Alexander, 1944
- S. zernyana Alexander, 1949
