= Aedes capensis =

Scientific classification
- Kingdom: Animalia
- Phylum: Arthropoda
- Class: Insecta
- Order: Diptera
- Family: Culicidae
- Genus: Aedes
- Subgenus: Albuginosus
- Species: A. capensis

Binomial name
- Aedes capensis Edwards 1924

Synonyms
- Aedes (Eccules) capensis Edwards, 1924; Albuginosus capensis (Edwards, 1924)

Species of mosquito

Aedes capensis is a species of mosquito primarily found in forests in sub-Saharan Africa.

== Classification ==
Aedes capensis is one of 9 species in the subgenus Albuginosus, which is only present in Africa.

== Distribution ==
Aedes capensis has been recorded from South Africa, Cameroon, Central African Republic, Ivory Coast, Kenya, Malawi, and Uganda.

== Biology ==
The larvae of Ae. capensis are primarily found in tree-holes. They have also been collected from banana axils and rock holes. The eggs have been collected in bamboo pots (ovitraps).

Adults are rarely collected in human landing catches. In human landing catches in Kenya, Ae. capensis were only collected in forest habitats, not in peridomestic or domestic settings.

== Medical importance ==
As it seems A. capensis do not commonly bite humans, it is unlikely that they are important in transmitting diseases to humans. However, the bloodfeeding habits of this species should be investigated further to see if it plays a role in the maintenance of zoonosis.
