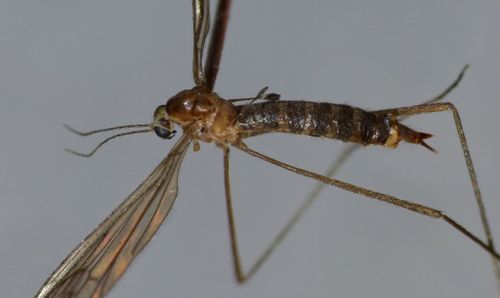
- Acantholimnophila bispina

Scientific classification
- Kingdom: Animalia
- Phylum: Arthropoda
- Class: Insecta
- Order: Diptera
- Family: Limoniidae
- Subfamily: Limnophilinae
- Genus: Acantholimnophila; Alexander, 1924

Type species
- Limnophila maorica Alexander, 1922

Species
- 2, see text

= Acantholimnophila =

Genus of flies

Acantholimnophila is a genus of crane fly in the family Limoniidae.

== Species ==
- A. bispina (Alexander, 1922)
- A. maorica (Alexander, 1922)
