= Max Paul Riedel =

German entomologist (1870–1941)

Max Paul Riedel (19 February 1870, Magdeburg – 27 March 1941 Frankfurt) was a German entomologist who specialised in Diptera, especially Tipulidae and Tachinidae. He wrote "Die palaarktischen Arten der Dipteren-Gattung Tipula L." and many shorter scientific papers on Tipulidae.

His insect collection is in the Museum für Naturkunde in Berlin.

== Works ==
- Die palaarktischen Arten der Dipteren-Gattung Tipula L., in: Abhandlungen des Vereins fur Naturwissenschaftliche Erforschung des Niederrheins, Krefeld 1: 1-122 (1913)
