= Frederick Wallace Edwards =

British entomologist

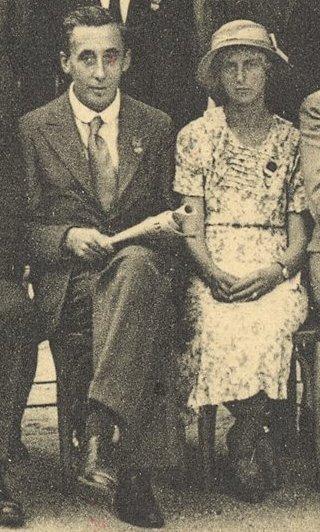
F. W. Edwards and Mrs. Edwards at the International Congress of Entomology in Madrid, 1935

Frederick Wallace Edwards FRS (28 November 1888 in Fletton, Peterborough – 15 November 1940 in London), was an English entomologist. Edwards was known in the field of entomology for his work on Diptera.

Edwards worked in the British Museum (Natural History) which contains his collections made on his expeditions to Norway and Sweden (1923), Switzerland and Austria (1925), Argentina and Chile (1926/27), with Raymond Corbett Shannon, Corsica and USA (1928), the Baltic (1933), Kenya and Uganda (1934-5) (as co-leader of the British Museum Ruwenzori expedition of 1934-35) with Ernest Gibbins, and the Pyrenees (1935). He was able to oversee publication of Alwyn M. Evan's monograph on The Mosquitoes of the Ethiopian Region after her death in 1937.

Among the unusual insects that he described was the flightless marine midge Pontomyia. The mosquito genus Fredwardsius is named to honor his work establishing the generic and subgeneric framework which forms the basis for modern day systematics of the Culicidae of the world.

== Works ==
For a partial list of works see the references in Sabrosky's Family Group Names in Diptera

== See also ==
- Category:Taxa named by Frederick Wallace Edwards

== Bibliography ==
- Alexander, C. P. 1941 [Edwards, F. W.] Can. Entomol. 73 94-95
- Anonym 1941: [Edwards, F. W.] Indian J. Ent. 3 149
- Blair, K. 1941: [Edwards, F. W.] Entomologist's Monthly Magazine (3) 77 20
- Evenhuis, N. L. 1997: Litteratura taxonomica dipterorum (1758–1930). Volume 1 (A-K); Volume 2 (L-Z). - Leiden, Backhuys Publishers 1; 2 VII+1-426; 427-871 1: 220–221, Portr.+Schr.verz.
- Imms, A. D. 1941: [Edwards, F. W.] Obit. Notices fellows Roy. Soc. London 3 735–745, Portr.
