= Charles Paul Alexander =

American entomologist (1889–1981)

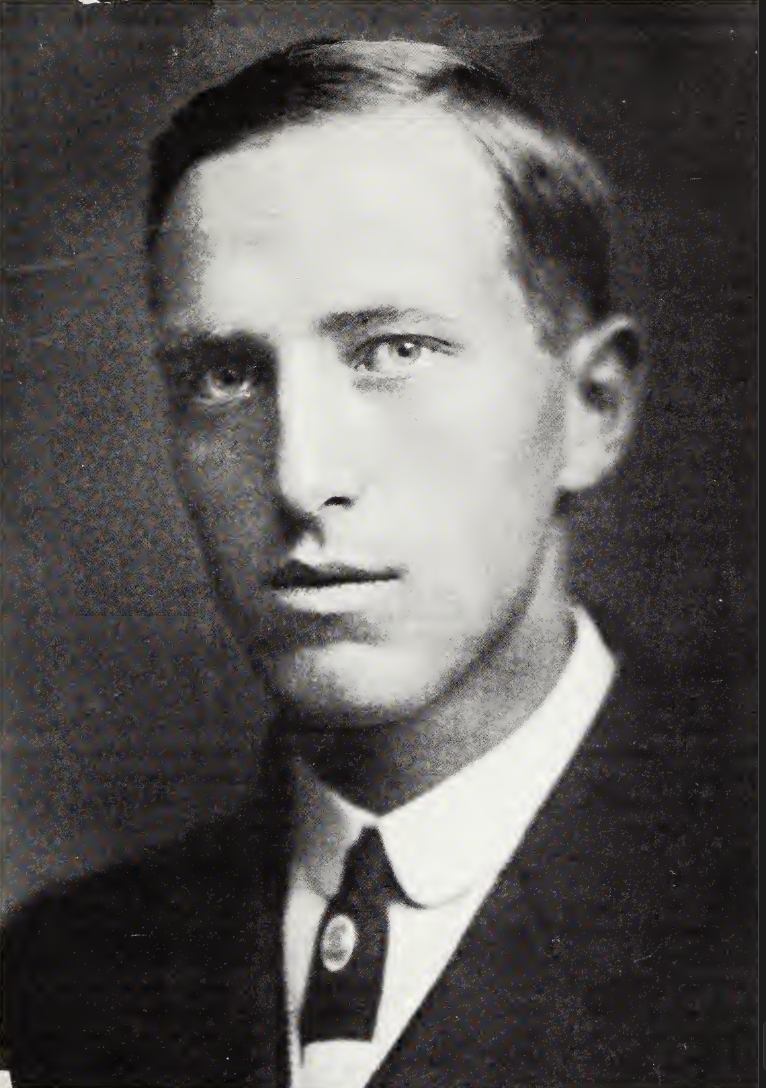
From Cornell 1913 Class Book

Charles Paul Alexander (September 25, 1889, Gloversville, New York – December 3, 1981) was an American entomologist who specialized in the cranefly family Tipulidae. He described more than 10,000 species of cranefly.

== Life and work ==
Charles Paul Alexander was born in Gloversville, the son of Emil Alexander and Jane Alexander (née Parker). Emil (the father) immigrated to the United States in 1873 and changed his surname from Schlandensky to Alexander. As a boy "Chuck" took a keen interest in maps and went into Simmons Woods along with his friend Axel Olsson to examine the natural world. They kept a list of the plants. At the age of 10 Alexander was interested in birds and was involved in a survey of Fulton County for E. H. Eaton who used the information in Birds of New York. His older brother William Prindle Alexander (1881-1956) became a noted conservationist. He began to study insects after comparing the numbers of species of insects and birds. He met E. P. Felt, the state entomologist, and took a box of 20-30 craneflies for identification in 1906. Felt noted that there was nobody in the country who could identify them and was able to name just one specimen as the species Bittacomorpha clavipes. Felt encouraged Alexander to study entomology, recommending Cornell University. He sought to become a student of James G. Needham. He was initially rejected at Cornell for lacking a knowledge of German (German III). He then worked at a glove factory in Johnstown and spent an hour a day to study and pass German III from Johnstown High School. Charles entered Cornell University in 1909, studying entomology earning a Bachelor of Science in 1913 and a Ph.D. in 1918. Between 1917 and 1919, he was an entomologist at the University of Kansas, serving also as curator of the Snow Entomological Collection. From 1919 to 1922, he worked at the Illinois State Natural History Survey in Urbana. In 1922 he became professor of entomology at Massachusetts Agricultural College at Amherst. He became dean in 1946 and retired in 1959. He studied Diptera, especially in the family Tipulidae. He described 11,755 taxa of flies, which translates to approximately a species description a day for his entire career.

He married Mabel M. Miller (1894–1979) in 1917 and she also became a specialist on the flies. In 1920, Alexander became a Fellow of the Entomological Society of America.

== Publications ==
Partial list, for a fuller list, see Oosterbroek (2022):

- A synopsis of part of the Neotropical Crane-flies of the subfamily Limnobinae (1913)
- (Tipulidae) 69 p – 4 pl (1913).
- The Crane flies of the Galapagoes Islands
- The Crane Flies of Alaska and the Canadian Northwest (Tipulidae, Diptera) The Genus Erioptera Meigen

== Other sources ==
- Anthony Musgrave (1932). Bibliography of Australian Entomology, 1775–1930, with biographical notes on authors and collectors, Royal Zoological Society of News South Wales (Sydney): viii + 380.
