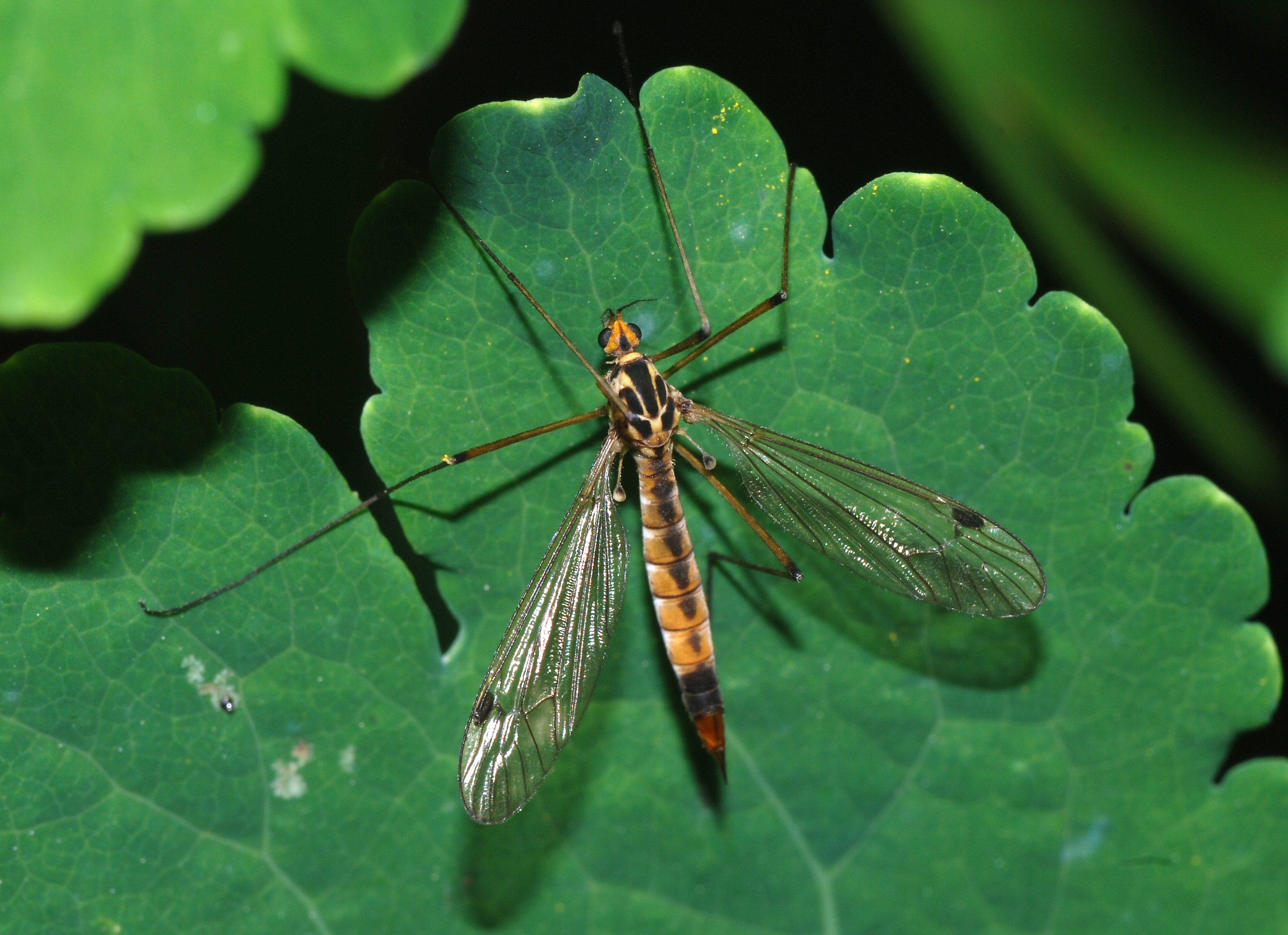
- Nephrotoma appendiculata (spotted crane fly)
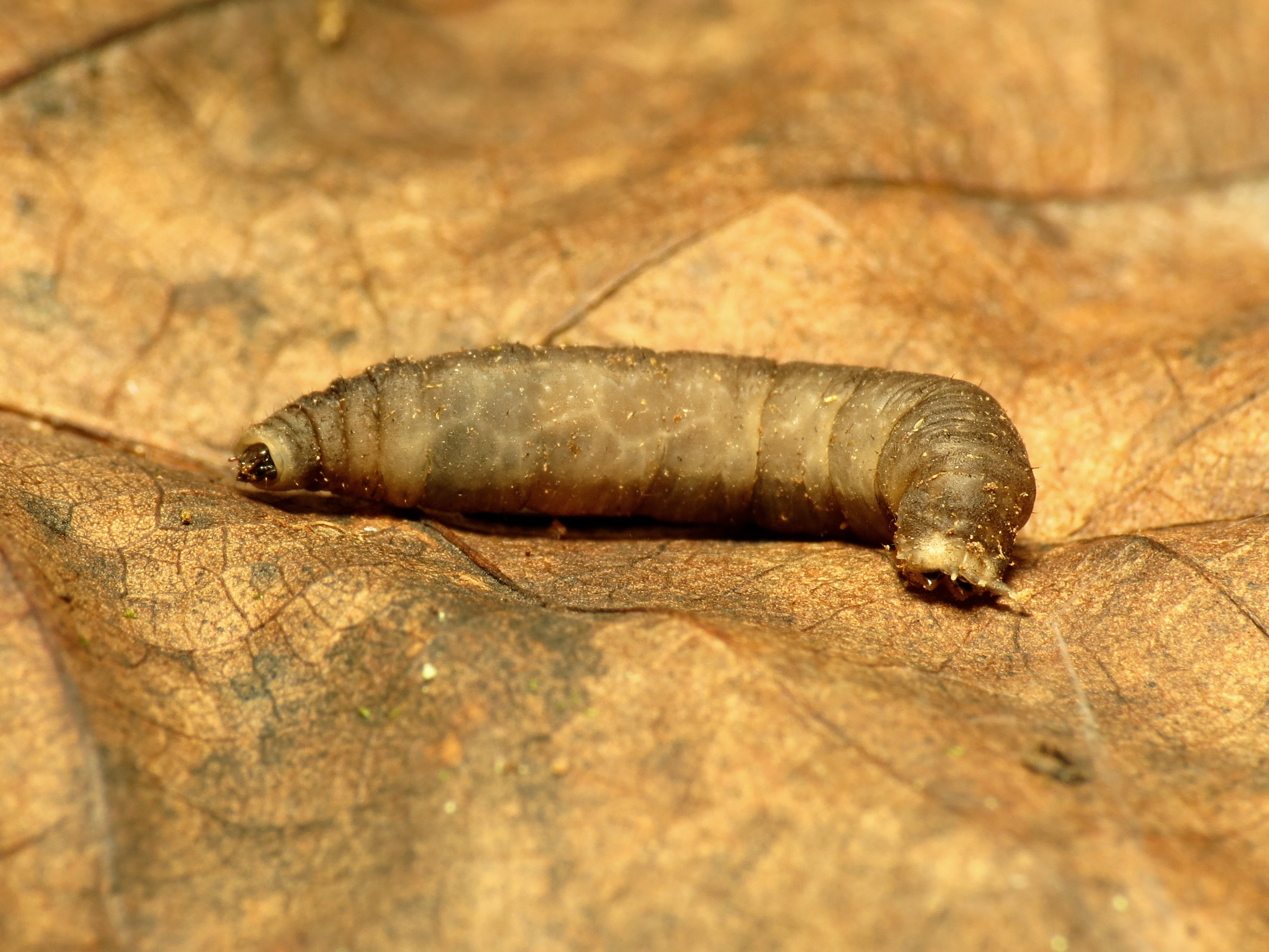
- Crane fly larva (leatherjacket)

Scientific classification
- Kingdom: Animalia
- Phylum: Arthropoda
- Clade: Pancrustacea
- Class: Insecta
- Order: Diptera
- Infraorder: Tipulomorpha
- Superfamily: Tipuloidea; Latreille, 1802

Families
- Cylindrotomidae Kertész, 1902; Limoniidae Speiser, 1909; Pediciidae Osten-Sacken, 1859; Tipulidae Latreille, 1802

= Crane fly =

Crane fly Temporal range: Middle Triassic – Present

Superfamily of flies

A crane fly or crane-fly, the larva called a leatherjacket, is a member of the dipteran superfamily Tipuloidea, which contains the living families Cylindrotomidae, Limoniidae, Pediciidae and Tipulidae, as well as several extinct families. "Winter crane flies", members of the family Trichoceridae, are sufficiently different from the typical crane flies of Tipuloidea to be excluded from the superfamily Tipuloidea, and are placed as their sister group within Tipulomorpha. Two other families of flies, the phantom crane flies (Ptychopteridae) and primitive crane flies (Tanyderidae), have similar common names due to their similar appearance.

The classification of crane flies has been varied in the past, with some or all of these families treated as subfamilies, but the following classification is currently accepted. Species counts are approximate, and vary over time.

Superfamily Tipuloidea (typical crane flies)
Family Cylindrotomidae (Cylindrotomid or long-bodied crane flies, 67 species)
Family Limoniidae (Limoniid crane flies, 10,786 species, possibly paraphyletic)
Family Pediciidae (Hairy-eyed crane flies, 498 species)
Family Tipulidae (Large crane flies, 4,351 species)

In colloquial speech, crane flies are also sometimes called "daddy longlegs", a name which is also used for arachnids of the family Pholcidae and the order Opiliones. The larvae of crane flies are known as leatherjackets.

Crane flies first appeared during the Middle Triassic, around 245 million years ago, making them one of the oldest known groups of flies, and are found worldwide, though individual species usually have limited ranges. They are most diverse in the tropics but are also common in northern latitudes and high elevations.

More than 15,500 species and over 500 genera of crane flies have been described, the majority by C.P. Alexander, who published descriptions of 10,890 new species and subspecies, and 256 new genera and subgenera over a period of 71 years from 1910–1981.

== Description ==
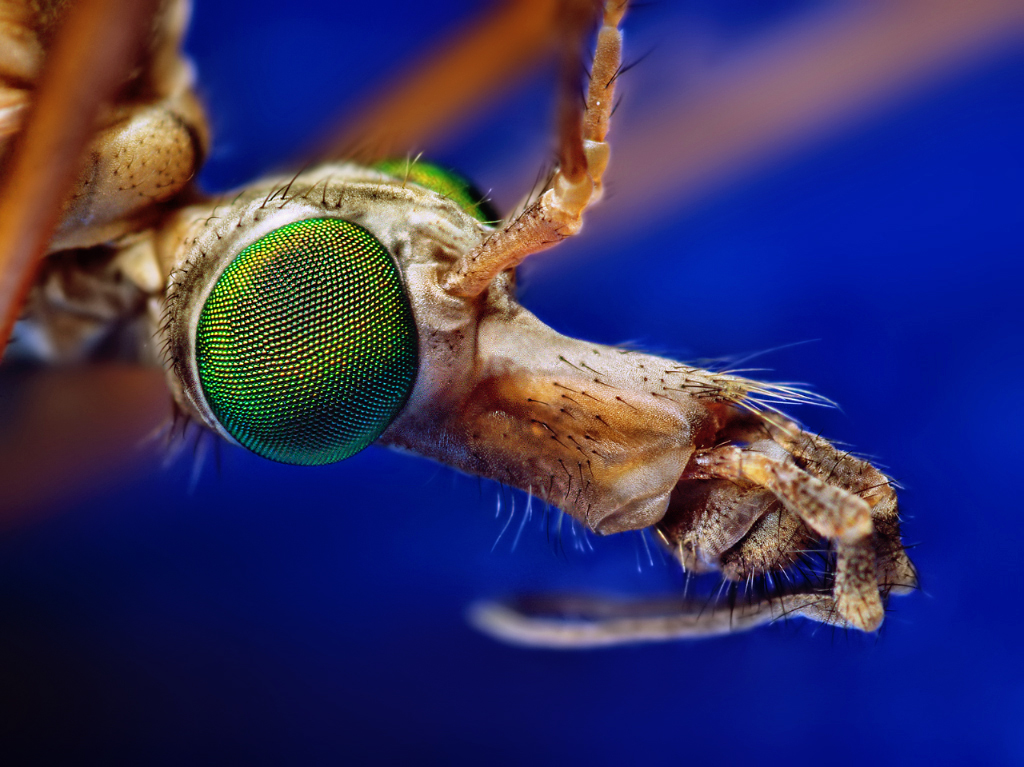
Head of a Tipula sp.

=== Summary ===
An adult crane fly, resembling an oversized male mosquito, typically has a slender body and long, stilt-like legs that are deciduous, easily coming off the body. Like other insects, their wings are marked with wing interference patterns which vary among species, thus are useful for species identification. They occur in moist, temperate environments such as vegetation near lakes and streams. They generally do not feed, but some species consume nectar, pollen, or water.

The wingspan is generally about 1.0 to 6.5 cm (1/2 to 2 1/2 in), though some species of Holorusia can reach 11 cm (4 1/4 in). The antennae have up to 19 segments. It is also characterized by a 'V'‑shaped suture or groove on the back of the thorax (mesonotum) and by its wing venation. The rostrum is long and in some species as long as the head and thorax together.

Larvae occur in various habitats including marshes, springs, decaying wood, moist soil, leaf litter, fungi, vertebrate nests and vegetation. They usually feed on decaying plant matter and microbes associated with this, but some species instead feed on living plants, fungi, or other invertebrates.

=== Formal ===
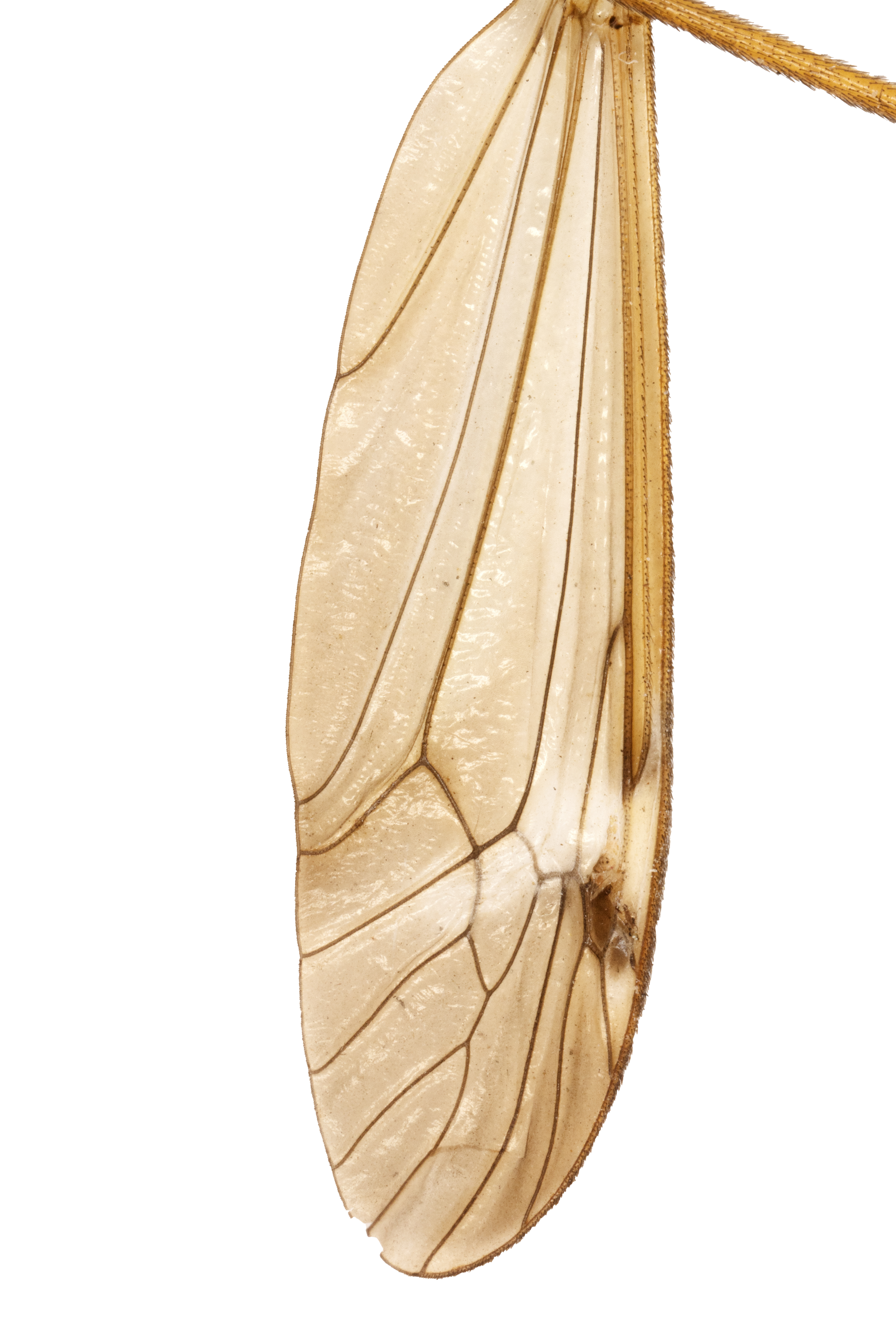
Wing of a crane fly

Tipuloidea are medium to large-sized flies (7–35 mm, 1/4–1 1/2 in) with elongated legs, wings, and abdomen. Their colour is yellow, brown, or grey. Ocelli are absent. The rostrum (a snout) is short with a beak-like point called the nasus (rarely absent). The apical segment of the maxillary palpi is flagelliform (whip-like) and much longer than the subapical segment. The antennae have 13 segments (exceptionally 14–19). These are whorled, serrate, or ctenidial (comb-like). There is a distinct 'V'‑shaped suture between the mesonotal prescutum and scutum (near the level of the wing bases). The wings are monochromatic, longitudinally striped or marbled. In females the wings are sometimes rudimentary. The sub-costal vein (Sc) joins through Sc2 with the radial vein, Sc1 is at most a short stump. There are four, rarely (when R2 is reduced) three branches of the radial vein merging into the alar margin. The discoidal wing cell is usually present. The wing has two anal veins. Sternite 9 of the male genitalia has, with few exceptions, two pairs of appendages. Sometimes appendages are also present on sternite 8. The female ovipositor has sclerotized valves and the cerci have a smooth or dentate lower margin. The valves are sometimes modified into thick bristles or short teeth.

The larvae are elongated, usually cylindrical. The posterior two-thirds of the head capsule is enclosed or retracted within the prothoracic segment. The larva is metapneustic (with only one pair of spiracles, these on the anal segment of the abdomen), but often with vestigial lateral spiracles (rarely apneustic). The head capsule is sclerotized anteriorly and deeply incised ventrally and often dorsolaterally. The mandibles are opposed and move in the horizontal or oblique plane. The abdominal segments have transverse creeping welts. The terminal segments of the abdomen are glabrous, often partially sclerotized and bearing posterior spiracles. The spiracular disc is usually surrounded by lobe-like projections and anal papillae or lobes.

Tipulidae

Dolichopeza

== Biology ==
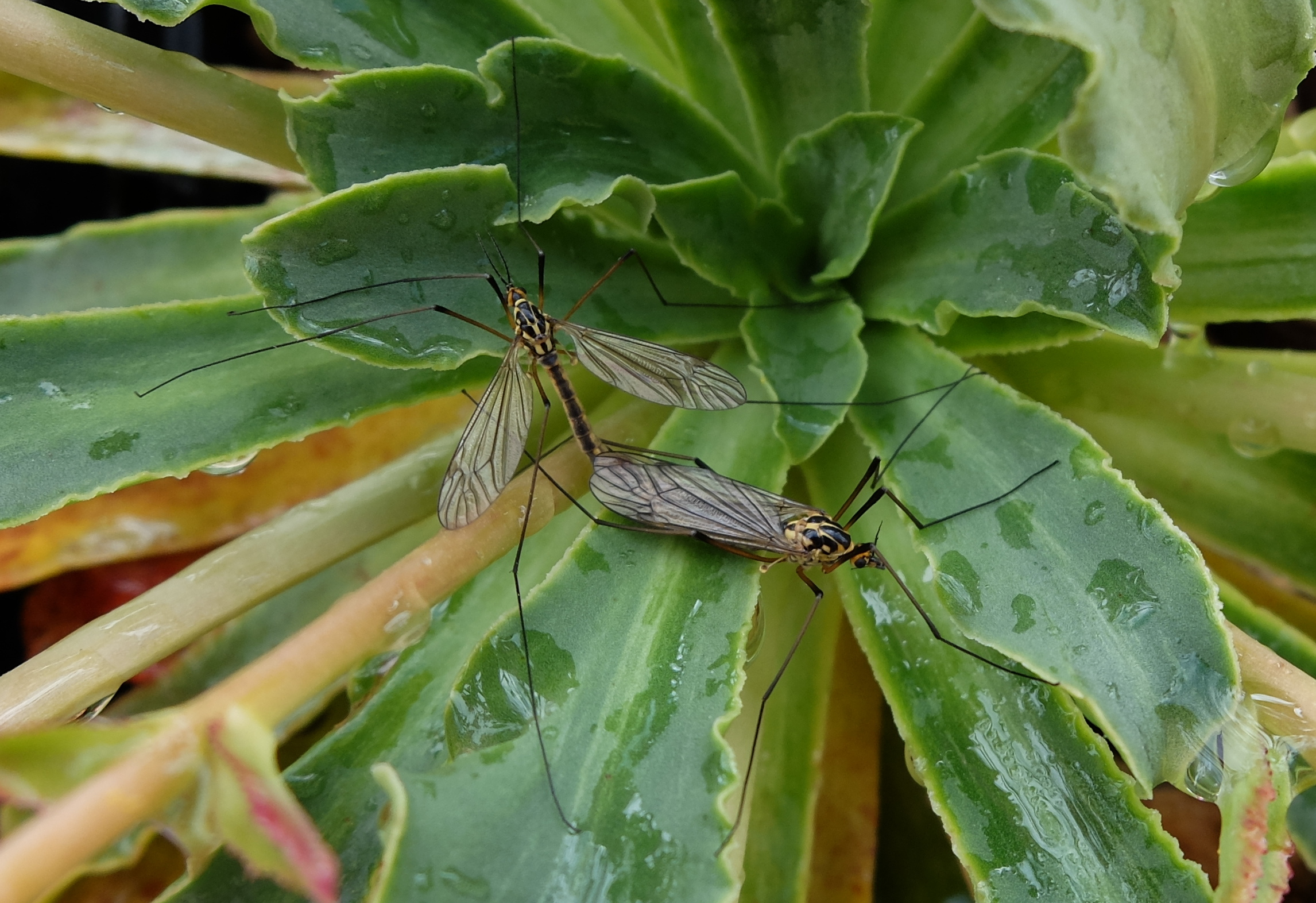
A pair of crane flies (Tipulidae) mating

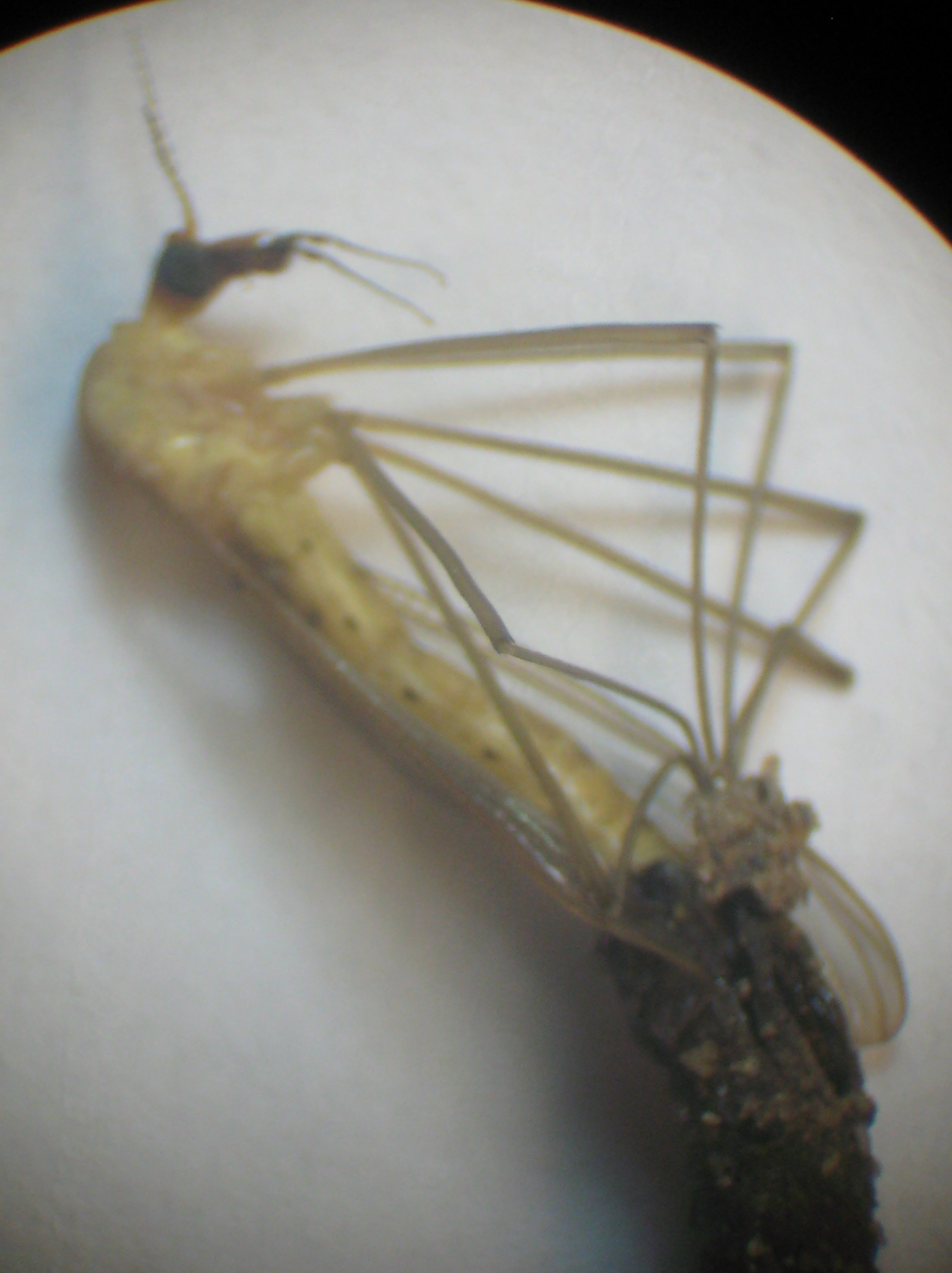
Crane fly exiting pupa

Mating craneflies— the light brown one with bipectinate antennae is male

Adults have a short lifespan of 10–15 days in which they search out for a mate to breed. Most adult crane flies generally do not feed, though the adults of some species will consume nectar and possibly pollen. The adult female usually contains mature eggs as she emerges from her pupa, and often mates immediately if a male is available. Males also search for females by walking or flying. Copulation takes a few minutes to hours and may be accomplished in flight. The female immediately oviposits, usually in wet soil or mats of algae. Some lay eggs on the surface of a water body or in dry soils, and some reportedly simply drop them in flight. Most crane fly eggs are black in color. They often have a filament, which may help anchor the egg in wet or aquatic environments.

Crane fly larvae (leatherjackets) have been observed in many habitat types on dry land and in water, including marine, brackish, and fresh water. They are cylindrical in shape, but taper toward the front end, and the head capsule is often retracted into the thorax. The abdomen may be smooth, lined with hairs, or studded with projections or welt-like spots. Projections may occur around the spiracles. Larvae may eat algae, microflora, and living or decomposing plant matter, including wood. Some are predatory.

== Ecology ==
Larval habitats include all kinds of freshwater, semiaquatic environments. Some Tipuloidea, including Dolichopeza, are found in moist to wet cushions of mosses or liverworts. Ctenophora species are found in decaying wood or sodden logs. Nephrotoma and Tipula larvae are found in dry soils of pasturelands, lawns, and steppe. Tipuloidea larvae are also found in rich organic earth and mud, in wet spots in woods where the humus is saturated, in leaf litter or mud, decaying plant materials, or fruits in various stages of putrefaction.

Larvae can be important in the soil ecosystem, because they process organic material and increase microbial activity. Larvae and adults are also valuable prey items for many animals, including insects, spiders, fish, amphibians, birds, and mammals.

Adult crane flies may be used for transport by aquatic species of the mite family Ascidae. This is known as phoresis.

== Pest status ==
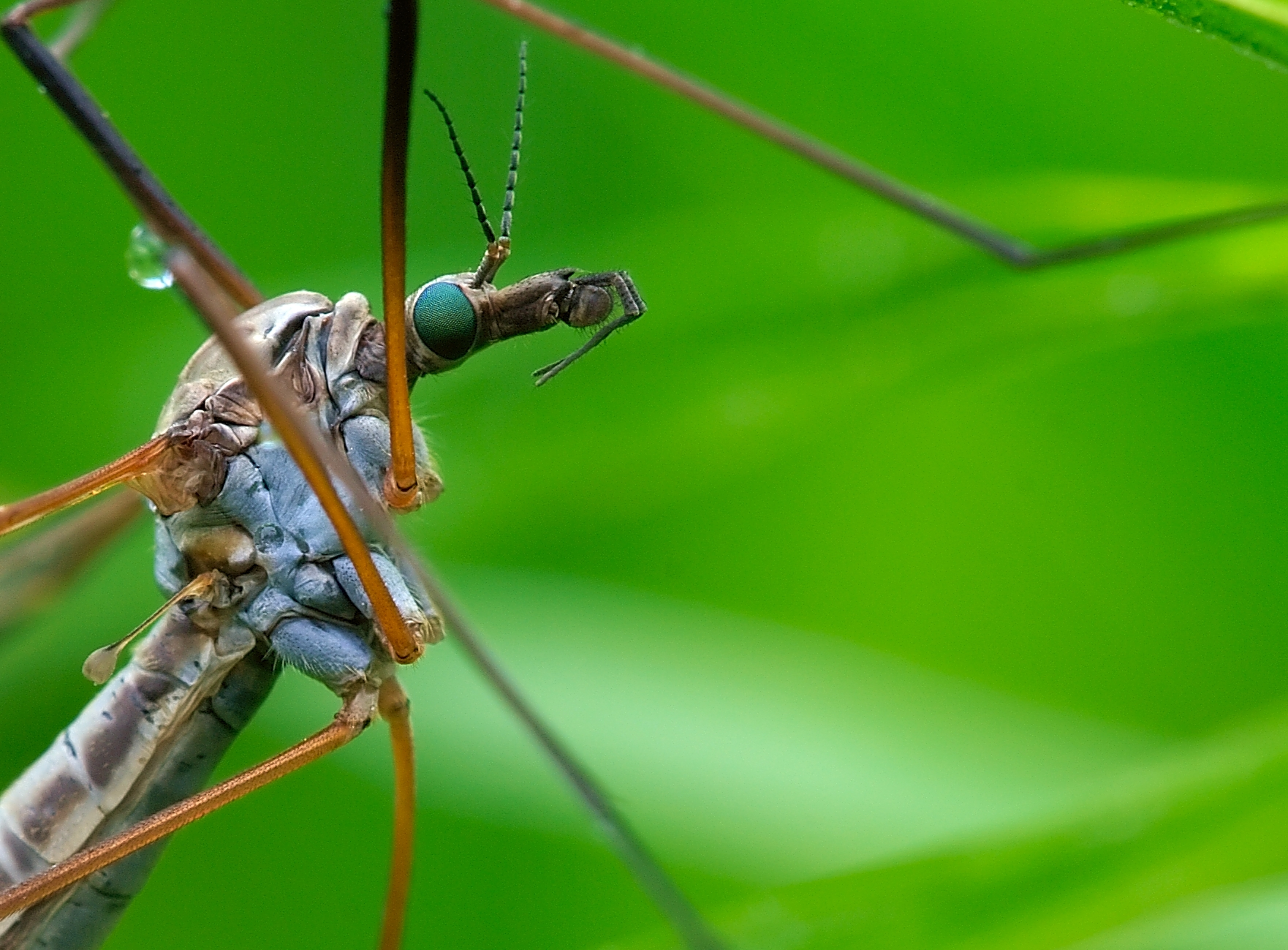
The thorax of a crane fly

Some members of the tipulid genus Tipula, such as the European crane fly, Tipula paludosa and the marsh crane fly T. oleracea are agricultural pests in Europe. The larvae of these species live in the top layers of soil where they feed on the roots, root hairs, crown, and sometimes the leaves of crops, stunting their growth or killing the plants. They are pests on a wide variety of plants. Since the late 1900s, T. paludosa and T. oleracea have become invasive in the United States. The larvae have been observed on many crops, including vegetables, fruits, cereals, pasture, lawn grasses, and ornamental plants. Starlings and members of the crow family will predate leatherjackets by probing for them beneath the soil, and the grubs have been successfully controlled by pathogenic nematodes watered on to the ground.

In 1935, Lord's Cricket Ground in London was among venues affected by leatherjackets. Several thousand were collected by ground staff and burned, because they caused bald patches on the pitch and the pitch took unaccustomed spin for much of the season.

== Phylogenetics ==
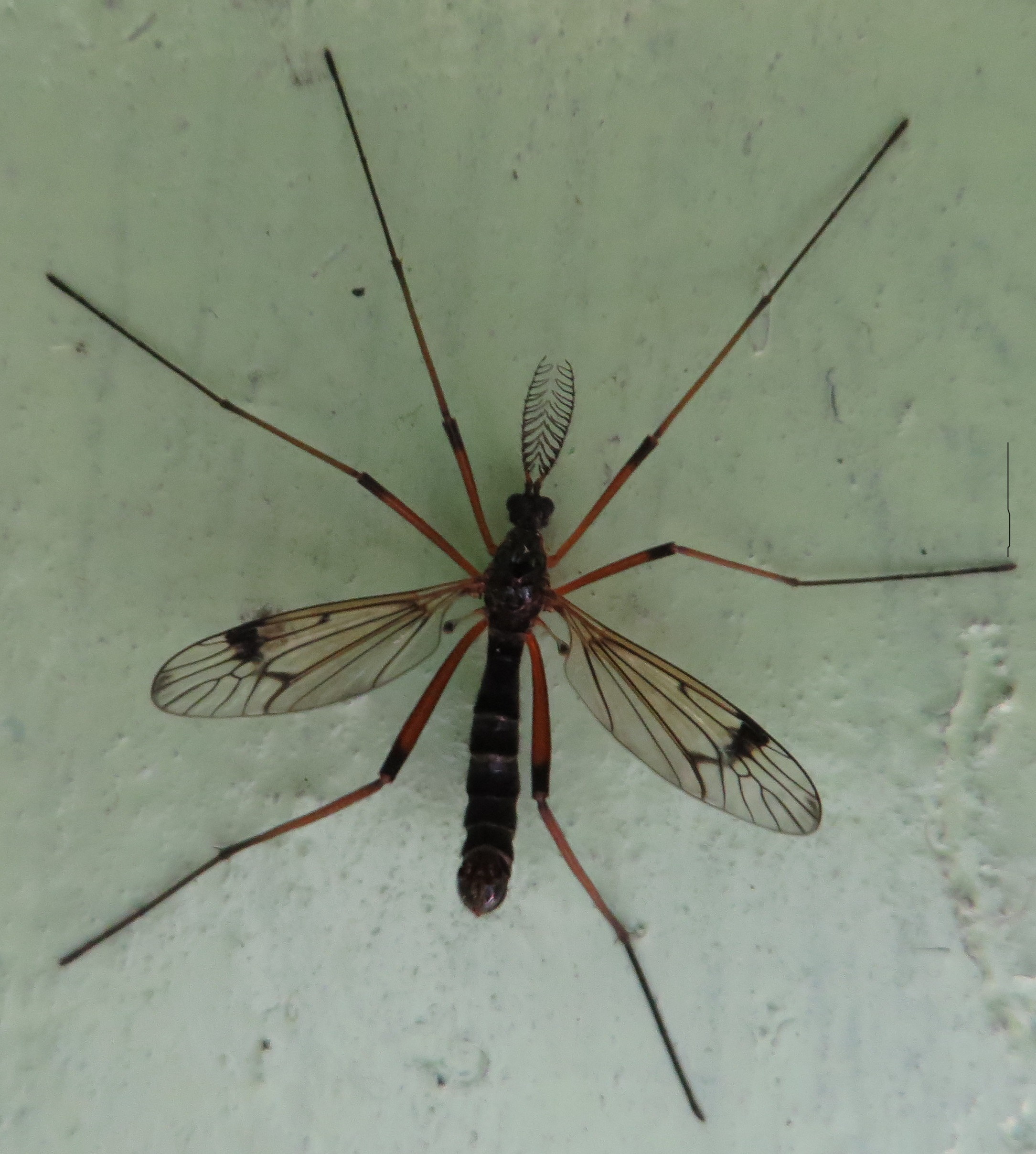
Tipulidae with large antennae

The phylogenetic position of the Tipuloidea remains uncertain. The classical viewpoint that they are an early branch of Diptera—perhaps (with the Trichoceridae) the sister group of all other Diptera—is giving way to modern views that they are more highly derived. This is thanks to evidence from molecular studies, which is consistent with the more derived larval characters similar to those of 'higher' Diptera. The Pediciidae and Tipulidae are sister groups (the "limoniids" are a paraphyletic clade). Specifically, Limoniidae has recently been treated by numerous authors at the rank of family, but subsequent phylogenetic analyses revealed that the remaining groups of tipulids render the group paraphyletic. The Cylindrotomidae appear to be a relict group that was much better represented in the Tertiary. Tipulidae probably evolved from ancestors in the Upper Jurassic, the Architipulidae, and representatives of the Limoniidae are known from the Upper Triassic.

Cladogram of lower "nematoceran" flies after Yang et al. 2025:

- Diptera
  - - Deuterophlebiidae
    - Nymphomyiidae
  - - Culicomorpha (biting and non-biting midges, mosquitoes)
    - - - Ptychopteridae (phantom crane flies)
        - Tipulomorpha incl. Tipuloidea (winter crane flies, true crane flies)
      - - Psychodomorpha (incl. primitive crane flies, drain flies)
        - - - Perissommatidae
            - Axymyiidae
          - - Bibionomorpha (midges, gnats, march flies/love bugs)
            - Brachycera (~120 families)

== Common names ==
Numerous common names have been applied to the crane fly. Many of the names are more or less regional in the U.S., including mosquito hawk, mosquito eater, skeeter eater, gallinipper, and gollywhopper. They are also known as "daddy longlegs" in English-speaking countries outside the U.S., not to be confused with the U.S. usages of "daddy long legs" that refer to either arachnids of the order Opiliones or the family Pholcidae. The larvae of crane flies are known commonly as leatherjackets.

They are also known as "Jenny long legs" in Scotland. In Ireland, they are generally called "daddy long legs" in English, whereas in Irish they are commonly known as Pilib an Gheataire, which means Skinny Philip.

== Misconceptions ==
There is an enduring urban legend that crane flies are the most venomous insects in the world; however, they have neither venom nor the ability to bite. The myth probably arose due to their being confused with the cellar spider as they are also informally called "daddy longlegs", and although the arachnid does possess venom, it is not especially potent.

Despite widely held beliefs that adult crane flies (or "mosquito hawks") prey on mosquito populations, the adult crane fly is anatomically incapable of killing or consuming other insects. Although the adults of some species may feed on nectar, the adults of many species have such short lifespans that they do not eat at all.

== See also ==
- Tipularia discolor, the crane fly orchid
