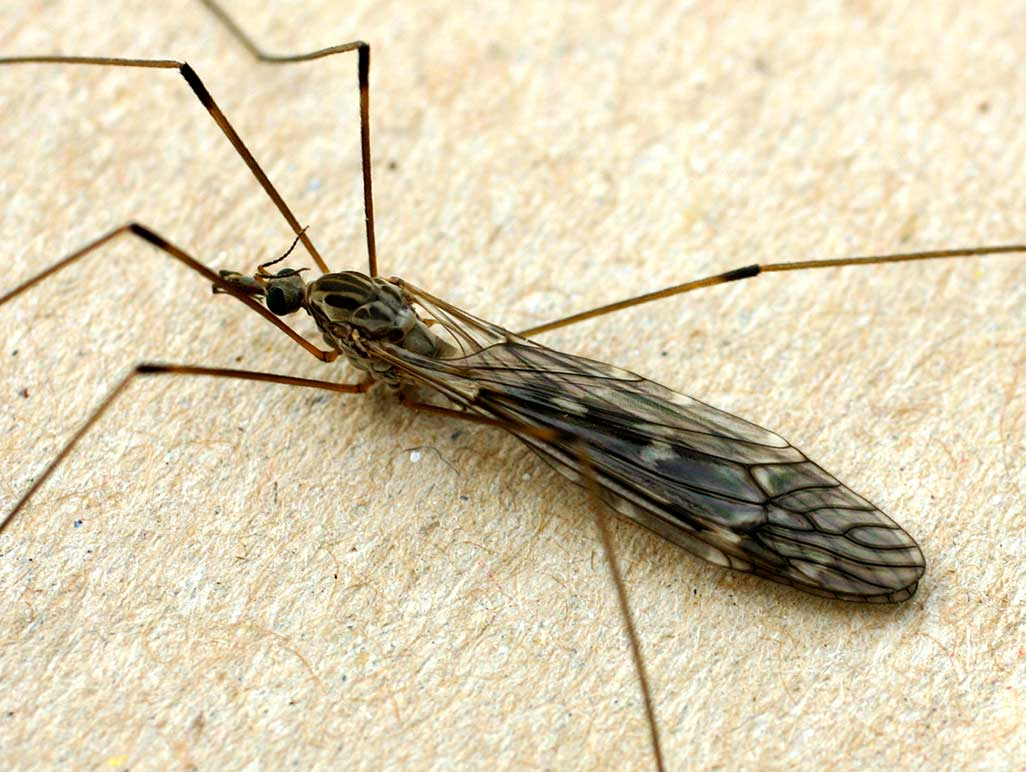
- Limonia nubeculosa

Scientific classification
- Kingdom: Animalia
- Phylum: Arthropoda
- Class: Insecta
- Order: Diptera
- Infraorder: Tipulomorpha
- Superfamily: Tipuloidea
- Family: Limoniidae

Diversity
- ca. 150 genera

= Limoniidae =

Limoniidae Temporal range: Late Triassic–Present

Crane flies

Limoniidae is the largest of four crane fly families, with more than 10,700 species in more than 150 genera. Some studies have suggested it to be a paraphyletic group, with some limoniids being more closely related to Tipulidae and Cylindrotomidae than to other limoniids. Limoniid crane flies can usually be distinguished by the way the wings are held at rest. Limoniids usually hold/fold the wings along the back of the body, whereas other crane flies usually hold them out at right angles. Snow flies (genus: Chionea) such as Chionea scita have no wings at all. Limoniids are also usually smaller than other crane flies, with some exceptions.

The classification of Limoniid crane flies has been varied in the past, with the group treated both as subfamily and family, but the following classification is currently accepted. (Species counts are approximate, and vary over time.). Recent phylogenetic analyses have revealed the family to be paraphyletic and further research is suggested.

Family Limoniidae (Limoniid Crane Flies, more than 10,700 species)
Subfamily Chioneinae (4,324 species and subspecies)
Subfamily Dactylolabinae (59 species and subspecies)
Subfamily Limnophilinae (2,593 species and subspecies)
Subfamily Limoniinae (3,873 species and subspecies)
Subfamily †Architipulinae (extinct)
Subfamily †Drinosinae (extinct)
Subfamily †Eotipulinae (extinct)

These flies are found in damp places throughout the world, and many species form dense swarms in suitable habitats.

== Description ==
Wing venation (Dicranomyia spp. and Dicranoptycha spp.)

Radius fork diagram

Limoniids are medium or small-sized, rarely large. The proboscis or rostrum lacks a beak. The apical segment of the maxillary palpi is short and never longer than subapical one. The antennae are, in most species, 14- or 16-segmented (rarely 6-, 10-, or 17-segmented), usually verticillate (whorls of trichia) and only exceptionally ctenidial or serrate (Rhipidia). There is a distinct V-shaped suture between the mesonotal prescutum and scutum (near the level of the wing bases). The wings are monochromatic or punctate and (in females more often than in males). sometimes shortened or reduced. The subcosta always fuses with the costa through Sc1. Radial vein R2 does not fuse with the costa, as in most other crane flies, but with radial vein R3. The radial sector Rs has one or two forks. Additional crossveins are sometimes present in cells r3 an1 and m. Cells m1 and d are often not present. The genitalia of males have large separated gonocoxis and one or two pairs of appendages which are sometimes greatly folded (Dicranomyia, etc.). The ovipositor of the female has sclerotized cerci. See for details of morphology.

== Biology ==
Mostly, larvae are aquatic or semi-aquatic. In comparison, most other Tipuloidea larvae are terrestrial, though some are aquatic and found in huge numbers in lotic habitats like the limoniid larvae. Various species have evolved to feed on different food sources, so phytophagous, saprophagous, mycetophagous and predatory species occur.

Limoniids occupy a wide range of habitats and micro habitats: in earth rich in humus, in swamps and marshes, in leaf litter and in wet spots in woods (numerous genera and species); in soils with only moderate humus content along stream borders (Gonomyia Meigen, Rhabdomastix Skuse, Arctoconopa Alexander, Hesperoconopa Alexander); in dry to saturated decaying wood in streams, where the larvae feed on fungal mycelia (Gnophomyia Osten Sacken, Teucholabis Osten Sacken, Lipsothrix Loew); in decaying plant materials (various subgenera and species of Limonia), in woody and fleshy fungi (Limonia (Metalimnobia Matsumura); in fresh water, especially rapidly flowing streams (Antocha Osten Sacken, Hesperoconopa Alexander, Cryptolabis Osten Sacken); intertidal zones and brackish water (Limonia (Idioglochina Alexander, Limonia (Diuanomyia) Stephens); freshwater aquatic environment during the larval stage and nearby margin areas for pupation (Limonia Meigen, Thaumastoptera Mik, many Pediciini, Limnophilinae, and Eriopterini); steep cliff faces supporting a constantly wet film of algae (some species of Limonia Meigen, Orimarga Osten Sacken Elliptera Schiner); in moist to wet cushions of mosses or liverworts growing on rocks or earth (various species).

Phantolabis lacustris was the first tipuloid species to be observed skating on the surface of water. It possesses morphological adaptations to allow for this phenomenon.

== Species lists ==
- Catalogue of the Craneflies of the World
- West Palaearctic including Russia
- Australasian/Oceanian
- Nearctic
- Japan

== Evolution ==
Limoniids are not particularly common in amber deposits, but a few finds (e.g. Tipunia intermedia Krzeminski & Ansorge, 1995 from the Upper Jurassic Solnhofen limestones) suggest the group has been extant since the Jurassic period. Another specimen (Limonia dillonae) preserved in amber in the Raritan-Magothy Formation suggests limoniids have been extant since the Upper Cretaceous period.

== Gallery ==
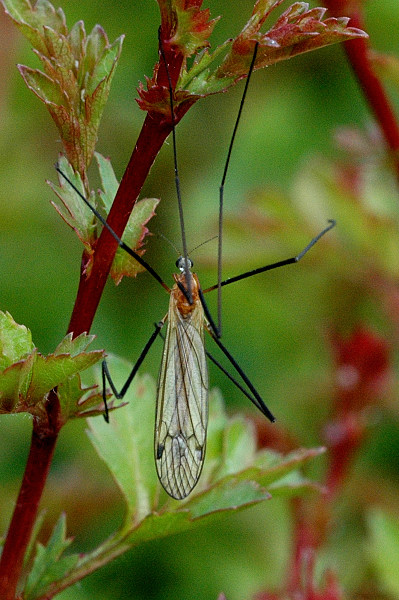
Austrolimnophila ochracea

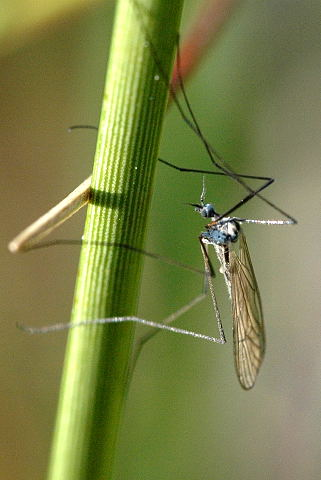
Dicranoptycha fuscescens

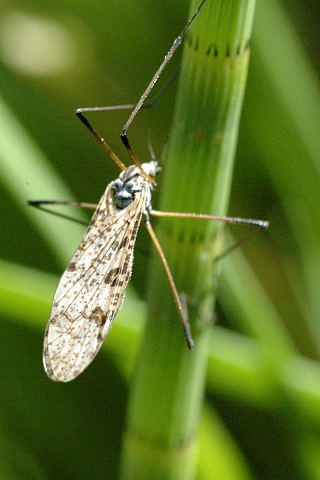
Eloeophila maculata

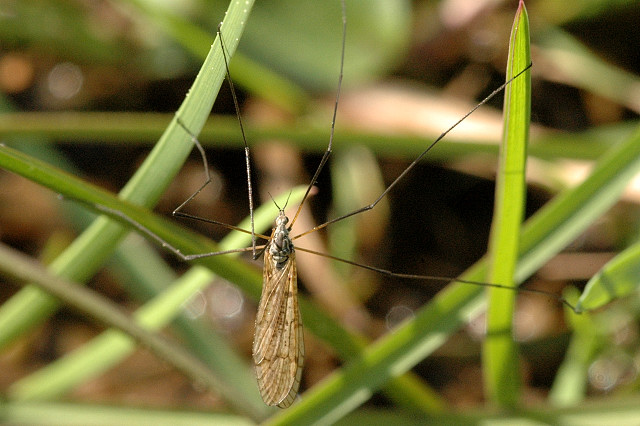
Limnophila schranki

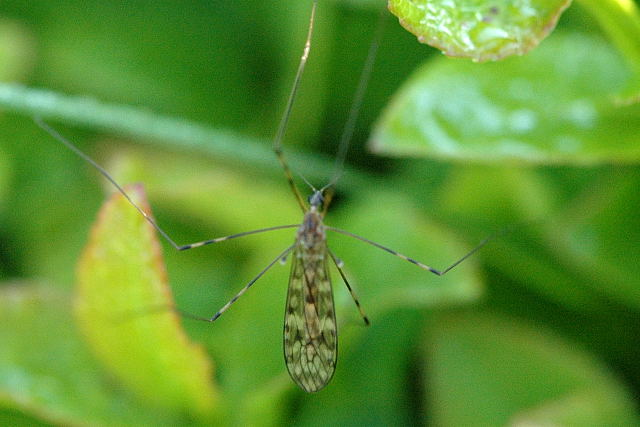
Limonia nubeculosa

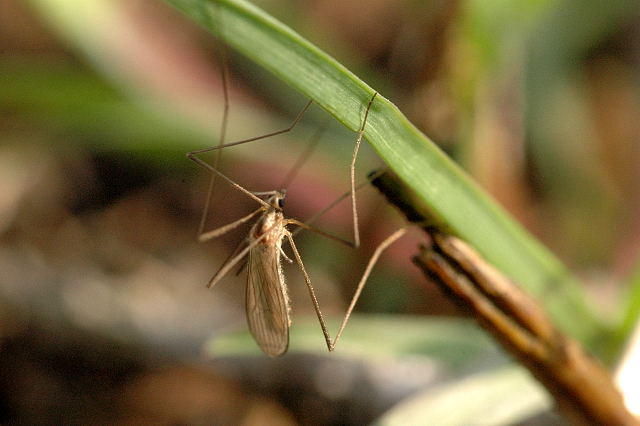
Phylidorea ferruginea

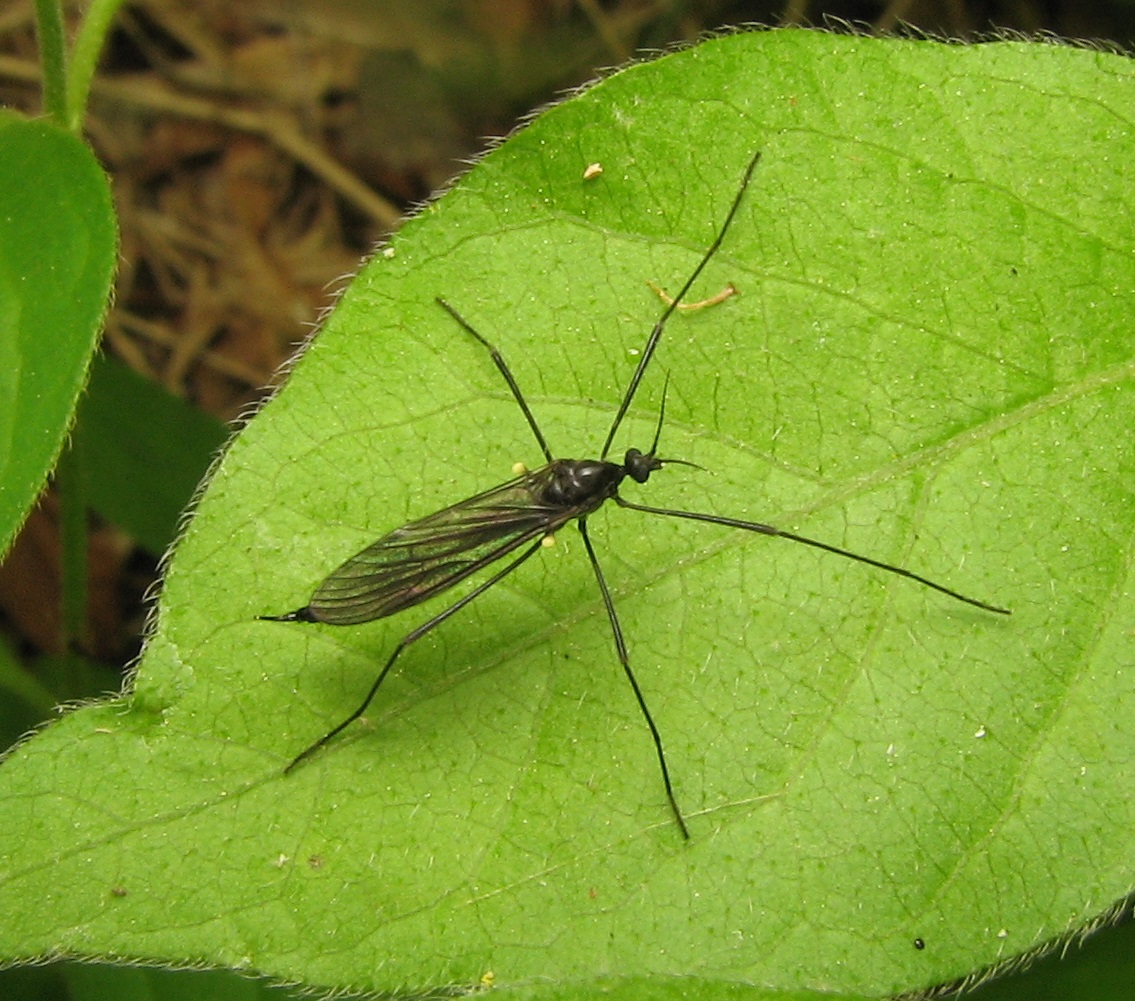
Gnophomyia tristissima

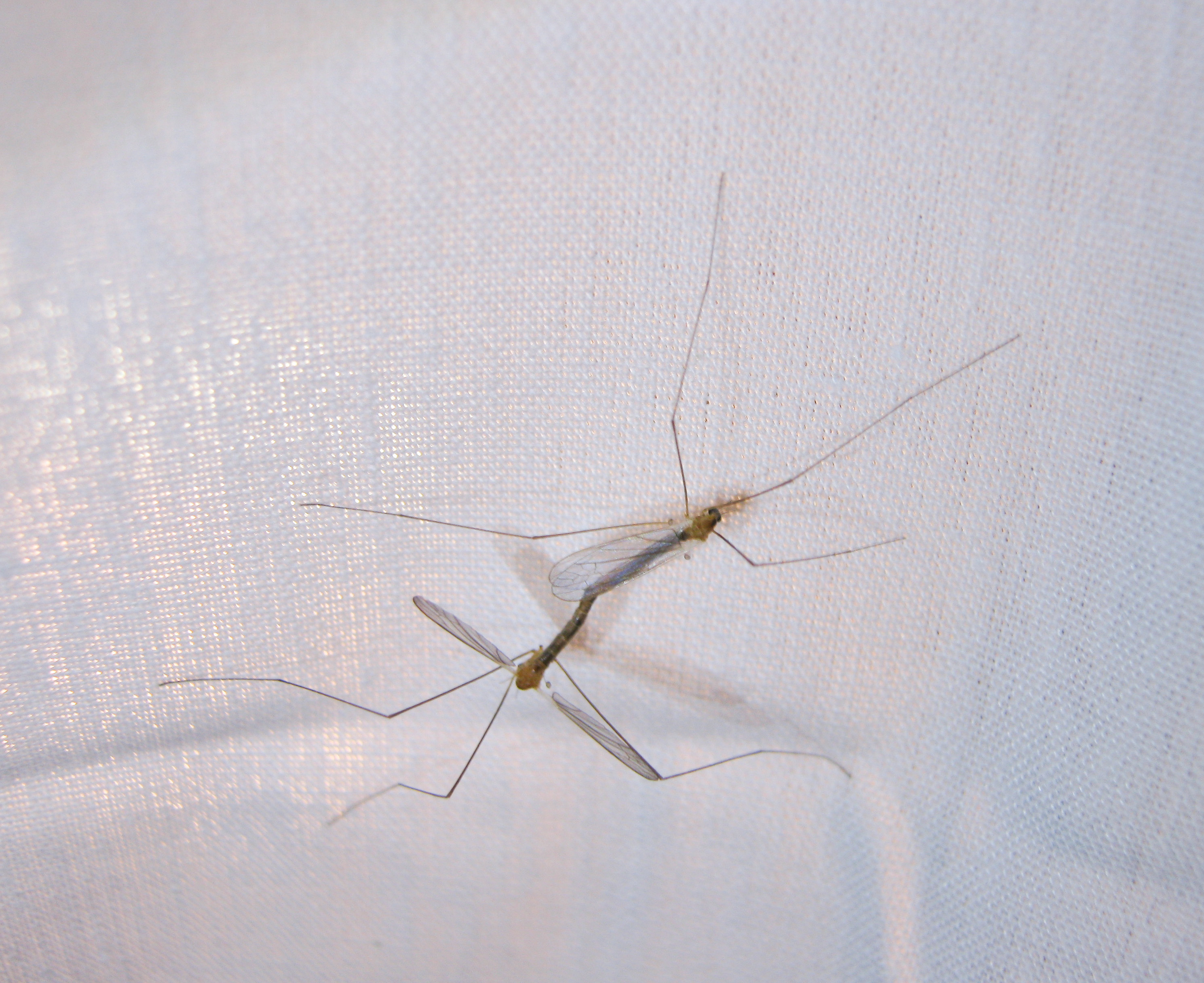
Antocha saxicola mating

== See also ==
- List of limoniid genera
