= S. princeps =

S. princeps may refer to:

- Spondylus princeps, a bivalve mollusc species found off the coast of Ecuador
- Stephanorrhina princeps, the spotted flower beetle, a beetle species endemic to Dedza province in Malawi
- Styringomyia princeps, a crane fly species in the genus Styringomyia
