= M. compactus =

M. compactus may refer to:

- Metridiochoerus compactus, an extinct pig species indigenous to the Pliocene and Pleistocene of Africa
- Molophilus compactus, a crane fly species in the genus Molophilus

== See also ==
- Compactus
