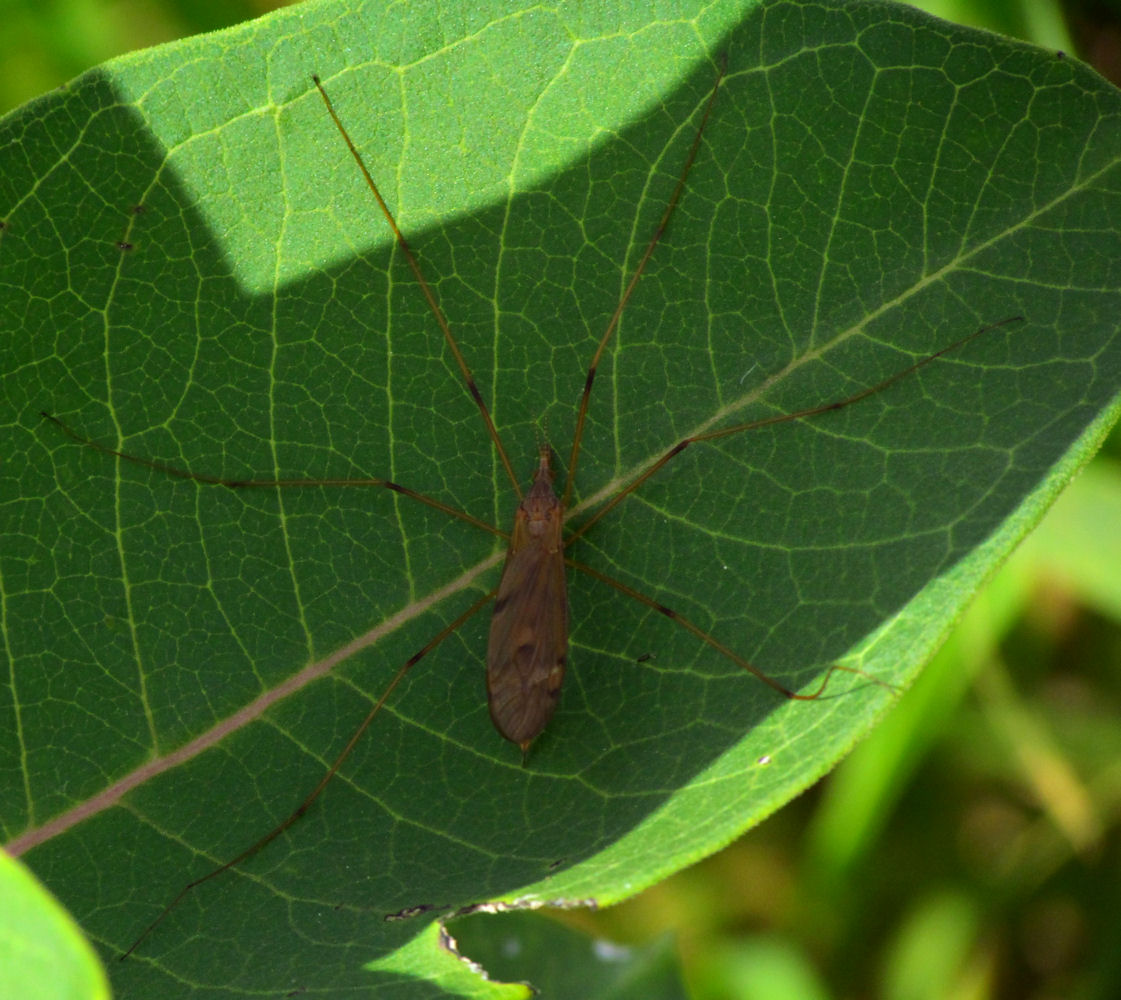
- Cladura flavoferruginea

Scientific classification
- Domain: Eukaryota
- Kingdom: Animalia
- Phylum: Arthropoda
- Class: Insecta
- Order: Diptera
- Family: Limoniidae
- Subfamily: Chioneinae
- Tribe: Eriopterini

= Eriopterini =

Tribe of flies

Eriopterini is a tribe of limoniid crane flies in the family Limoniidae. There are more than 20 genera and 3,800 described species in Eriopterini.

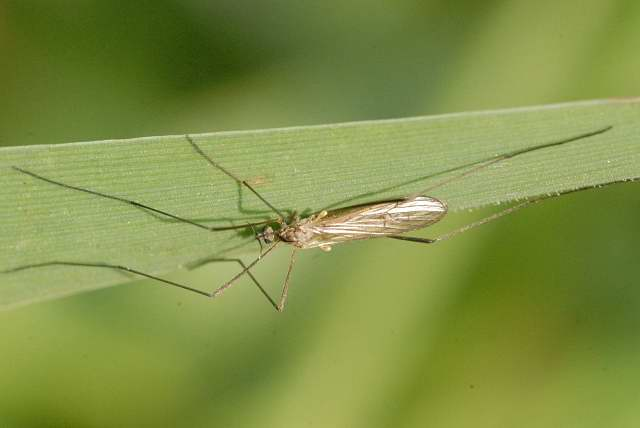
Symplecta pilipes

== Genera ==
These 27 genera belong to the tribe Eriopterini:

- Arctoconopa Alexander, 1955
- Cheilotrichia Rossi
- Chionea Dalman, 1816 (snow flies)
- Cladura Osten Sacken, 1859
- Cryptolabis Osten-Sacken, 1859
- Erioptera Meigen, 1800
- Eugnophomyia Alexander, 1947
- Gnophomyia Osten Sacken, 1859
- Gonempeda Alexander, 1924
- Gonomyia Meigen
- Gonomyodes Alexander, 1948
- Gonomyopsis Alexander, 1966
- Hesperoconopa Alexander, 1948
- Idiognophomyia Alexander, 1956
- Lipsothrix Loew, 1873
- Molophilus Curtis, 1833
- Neocladura Alexander, 1920
- Neolimnophila Alexander, 1920
- Ormosia Rondani, 1856
- Phantolabis Alexander, 1956
- Rhabdomastix Skuse, 1890
- Sigmatomera Osten-Sacken, 1869
- Styringomyia (Loew)
- Symplecta Meigen, 1830
- Tasiocera Skuse, 1890
- Teucholabis Osten Sacken, 1859
- Toxorhina Loew, 1850
