= Neolimnophila =

Scientific classification
- Kingdom: Animalia
- Phylum: Arthropoda
- Class: Insecta
- Order: Diptera
- Family: Limoniidae
- Tribe: Eriopterini
- Genus: Neolimnophila; Alexander, 1920

Type species
- Limnophila ultima Osten-Sacken, 1860

Genus of flies

Neolimnophila is a genus of crane flies in the family Limoniidae.

== Species ==
- N. alticola Alexander, 1929
- N. andicola Alexander, 1942
- N. appalachicola Alexander, 1941
- N. bergrothi (Kuntze, 1919)
- N. bifusca Alexander, 1960
- N. brevissima Alexander, 1952
- N. capnioptera Alexander, 1947
- N. carteri (Tonnoir, 1921)
- N. citribasis Alexander, 1966
- N. daedalea Alexander, 1966
- N. fuscinervis Edwards, 1928
- N. fuscocubitalis Alexander, 1936
- N. genitalis (Brunetti, 1912)
- N. perreducta Alexander, 1935
- N. picturata Alexander, 1931
- N. placida (Meigen, 1830)
- N. ultima (Osten Sacken, 1860)
