= Neocladura delicatula =

Scientific classification
- Domain: Eukaryota
- Kingdom: Animalia
- Phylum: Arthropoda
- Class: Insecta
- Order: Diptera
- Family: Limoniidae
- Genus: Neocladura
- Species: N. delicatula

Binomial name
- Neocladura delicatula (Alexander, 1914)

Synonyms
- Cladura delicatula Alexander, 1914

Species of fly

Neocladura delicatula is a species of limoniid crane fly in the family Limoniidae.
