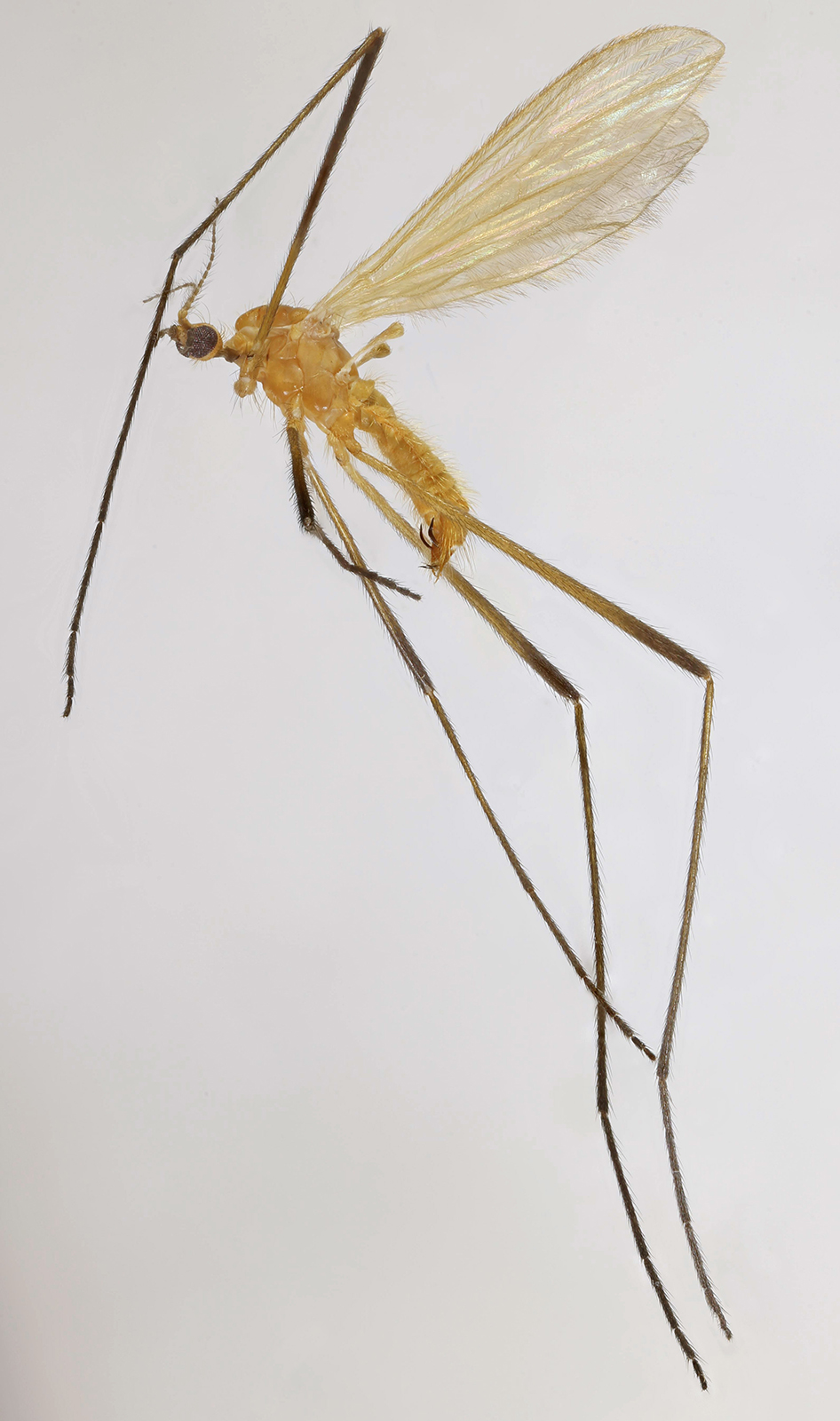
- Molophilus appendiculatus North Wales

Scientific classification
- Kingdom: Animalia
- Phylum: Arthropoda
- Class: Insecta
- Order: Diptera
- Family: Limoniidae
- Genus: Molophilus
- Species: M. appendiculatus

Binomial name
- Molophilus appendiculatus (Stæger, 1840)

= Molophilus appendiculatus =

Species of fly

Molophilus appendiculatus is a species of fly in the family Limoniidae. It is found in the Palearctic.
