= Rhabdomastix =

Scientific classification
- Kingdom: Animalia
- Phylum: Arthropoda
- Clade: Pancrustacea
- Class: Insecta
- Order: Diptera
- Family: Limoniidae
- Tribe: Eriopterini
- Genus: Rhabdomastix; Skuse, 1890

Type species
- Rhabdomastix ostensackeni Skuse, 1890

Subgenera
- Lurdia Stary, 2003; Rhabdomastix Skuse, 1890

Synonyms
- Palaeogonomyia Meunier, 1899 (fossil); Sacandaga Alexander, 1911

Genus of flies

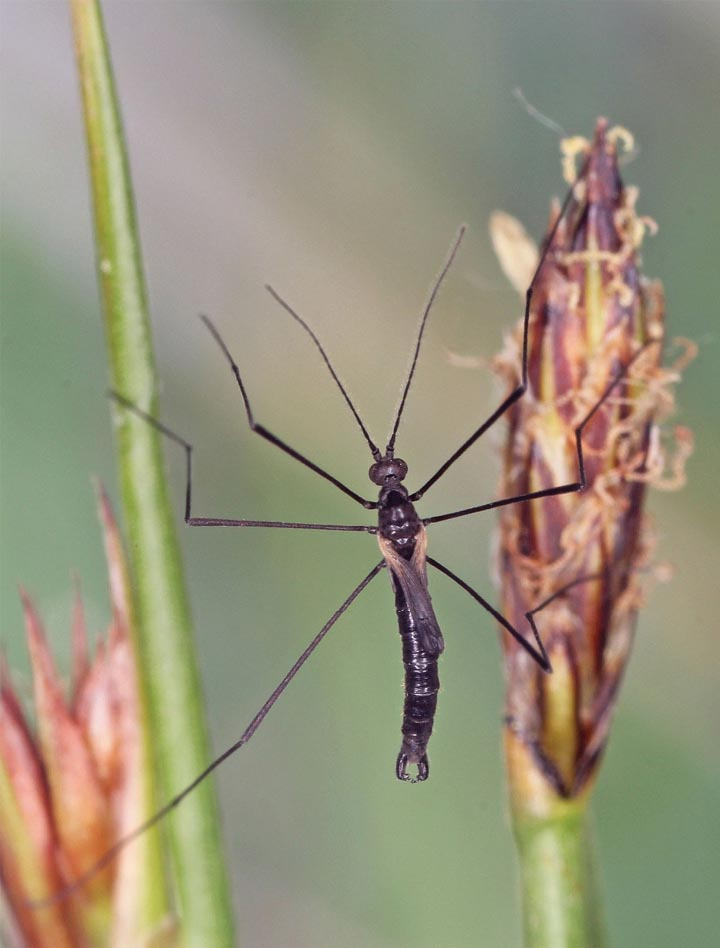
Rhabdomastix incapax

Rhabdomastix is a genus of crane fly in the family Limoniidae.

== Species ==
- Subgenus Lurdia Stary, 2003

- R. falcata Stary, 2003
- R. furva Stary, 2003
- R. inclinata Edwards, 1938
- R. loewi Stary, 2003
- R. lurida (Loew, 1873)
- R. luridoides Alexander, 1940
- R. mendli Stary, 2003
- R. neolurida Alexander, 1943
- R. robusta Stary, 2003
- R. setigera Alexander, 1943
- R. sublurida Stary, 2003
- R. tatrica Stary, 2003

- Subgenus Rhabdomastix Skuse, 1890

- R. afra Wood, 1952
- R. almorae Alexander, 1960
- R. alticola Alexander, 1944
- R. angusticellula Alexander, 1957
- R. arnaudi Alexander, 1964
- R. atrata Alexander, 1925
- R. austrocaledoniensis Alexander, 1948
- R. beckeri (Lackschewitz, 1935)
- R. borealis Alexander, 1924
- R. brachyneura Alexander, 1933
- R. brevicellula Alexander, 1976
- R. brittoni Alexander, 1933
- R. californiensis Alexander, 1921
- R. callosa Alexander, 1923
- R. caparaoensis Alexander, 1944
- R. chilota Alexander, 1929
- R. coloradensis Alexander, 1917
- R. corax Stary, 2004
- R. crassa Stary, 2004
- R. edwardsi Tjeder, 1967
- R. emodicola Alexander, 1957
- R. eugeni Stary, 2004
- R. fasciger Alexander, 1920
- R. feuerborni Alexander, 1931
- R. filata Stary, 2004
- R. flava (Alexander, 1911)
- R. flavidula Edwards, 1926
- R. fumipennis Alexander, 1939
- R. galactoptera (Bergroth, 1888)
- R. georgica Stary, 2004
- R. glabrivena Alexander, 1981
- R. hansoni Alexander, 1939
- R. himalayensis Alexander, 1960
- R. hirticornis (Lackschewitz, 1940)
- R. holomelania Alexander, 1935
- R. hudsonica Alexander, 1933
- R. hynesi Alexander, 1966
- R. illudens Alexander, 1914
- R. incapax Stary, 2005
- R. indigena Alexander, 1958
- R. intermedia Alexander, 1929
- R. ioogoon Alexander, 1948
- R. isabella Alexander, 1927
- R. japonica Alexander, 1924
- R. laeta (Loew, 1873)
- R. laetoidea Stary, 2004
- R. laneana Alexander, 1979
- R. leonardi Alexander, 1930
- R. leucophaea Savchenko, 1976
- R. lipophleps Alexander, 1948
- R. longiterebrata Alexander, 1938
- R. luteola Alexander, 1944
- R. manipurensis Alexander, 1964
- R. margarita Alexander, 1940
- R. mediovena Alexander, 1933
- R. megacantha Alexander, 1959
- R. mexicana Alexander, 1938
- R. microxantha Alexander, 1958
- R. minicola Alexander, 1934
- R. minima Alexander, 1926
- R. monilicornis Alexander, 1926
- R. nebulifera Alexander, 1957
- R. neozelandiae Alexander, 1922
- R. nigroapicata Alexander, 1940
- R. nigropumila Alexander, 1964
- R. nilgirica Alexander, 1949
- R. normalis Alexander, 1972
- R. nuttingi Alexander, 1950
- R. omeina Alexander, 1932
- R. optata Alexander, 1923
- R. ostensackeni Skuse, 1890
- R. otagana Alexander, 1922
- R. parvicornis Alexander, 1969
- R. parvula Alexander, 1938
- R. perglabrata Alexander, 1962
- R. peruviana Alexander, 1926
- R. plaumanni Alexander, 1947
- R. posticata Alexander, 1929
- R. sadoensis Alexander, 1958
- R. sagana Alexander, 1925
- R. satipoensis Alexander, 1944
- R. schmidiana Alexander, 1958
- R. septentrionalis Alexander, 1914
- R. shansica Alexander, 1954
- R. shardiana Alexander, 1957
- R. spatulifera Alexander, 1940
- R. strictivena Alexander, 1964
- R. subfasciger Alexander, 1927
- R. subparva Stary, 1971
- R. synclera Alexander, 1928
- R. tantilla Alexander, 1938
- R. teriensis Alexander, 1962
- R. tonnoirana Alexander, 1934
- R. trichiata Alexander, 1923
- R. trichophora Alexander, 1943
- R. trochanterata Edwards, 1928
- R. tugela Alexander, 1964
- R. unipuncta Alexander, 1944
- R. ussurica Alexander, 1934
- R. usuriensis Alexander, 1925
- R. vittithorax Alexander, 1923
- R. wilsoniana Alexander, 1934

- Unplaced

- R. caudata (Lundbeck, 1898)
- R. leptodoma Alexander, 1943
- R. monticola Alexander, 1916
- R. parva (Siebke, 1863)
- R. subarctica Alexander, 1933
- R. subcaudata Alexander, 1927
