= Gonempeda =

Scientific classification
- Kingdom: Animalia
- Phylum: Arthropoda
- Class: Insecta
- Order: Diptera
- Family: Limoniidae
- Tribe: Eriopterini
- Genus: Gonempeda; Alexander, 1924

Type species
- Limnobia flava Schummel, 1829

Species
- See text

Genus of flies

Gonempeda is a genus of crane fly in the family Limoniidae.

== Species ==
- G. armata Savchenko, 1971
- G. burra (Alexander, 1924)
- G. flava (Schummel, 1829)
- G. nyctops (Alexander, 1916)
- G. yellowstonensis (Alexander, 1943)
