= Lipsothrix =

Scientific classification
- Kingdom: Animalia
- Phylum: Arthropoda
- Class: Insecta
- Order: Diptera
- Family: Limoniidae
- Tribe: Eriopterini
- Genus: Lipsothrix; Loew, 1873

Type species
- Lipsothrix nobilis Loew, 1873

Species
- see text

Synonyms
- Electrolabis Alexander, 1931

Genus of flies

Lipsothrix is a genus of crane fly in the family Limoniidae.

== Distribution ==
Palaearctic & Oriental.

== Species ==
- L. apicifusca Alexander, 1957
- L. assamica Alexander, 1938
- L. babai Alexander, 1958
- L. burmica Alexander, 1952
- L. chettri Alexander, 1959
- L. decurvata Alexander, 1966
- L. ecucullata Edwards, 1938
- L. errans (Walker, 1848)
- L. fenderi Alexander, 1946
- L. flavissima Alexander, 1952
- L. fulva Alexander, 1966
- L. heitfeldi Alexander, 1949
- L. hynesiana Alexander, 1964
- L. iranica Alexander, 1975
- L. kashmirica Alexander, 1935
- L. kraussiana Alexander, 1950
- L. leucopeza Alexander, 1953
- L. malla Alexander, 1959
- L. mirabilis Alexander, 1940
- L. mirifica Alexander, 1962
- L. neotropica Alexander, 1940
- L. nervosa Edwards, 1938
- L. nigrilinea (Doane, 1900)
- L. nigristigma Edwards, 1938
- L. nobilis Loew, 1873
- L. orthotenes Alexander, 1971
- L. pluto Alexander, 1929
- L. propatula Alexander, 1952
- L. remota (Walker, 1848)
- L. shasta Alexander, 1946
- L. sylvia (Alexander, 1916)
- L. taiwanica Alexander, 1928
- L. tokunagai Alexander, 1933
- L. yakushimae Alexander, 1930
- L. yamamotoana Alexander, 1950
