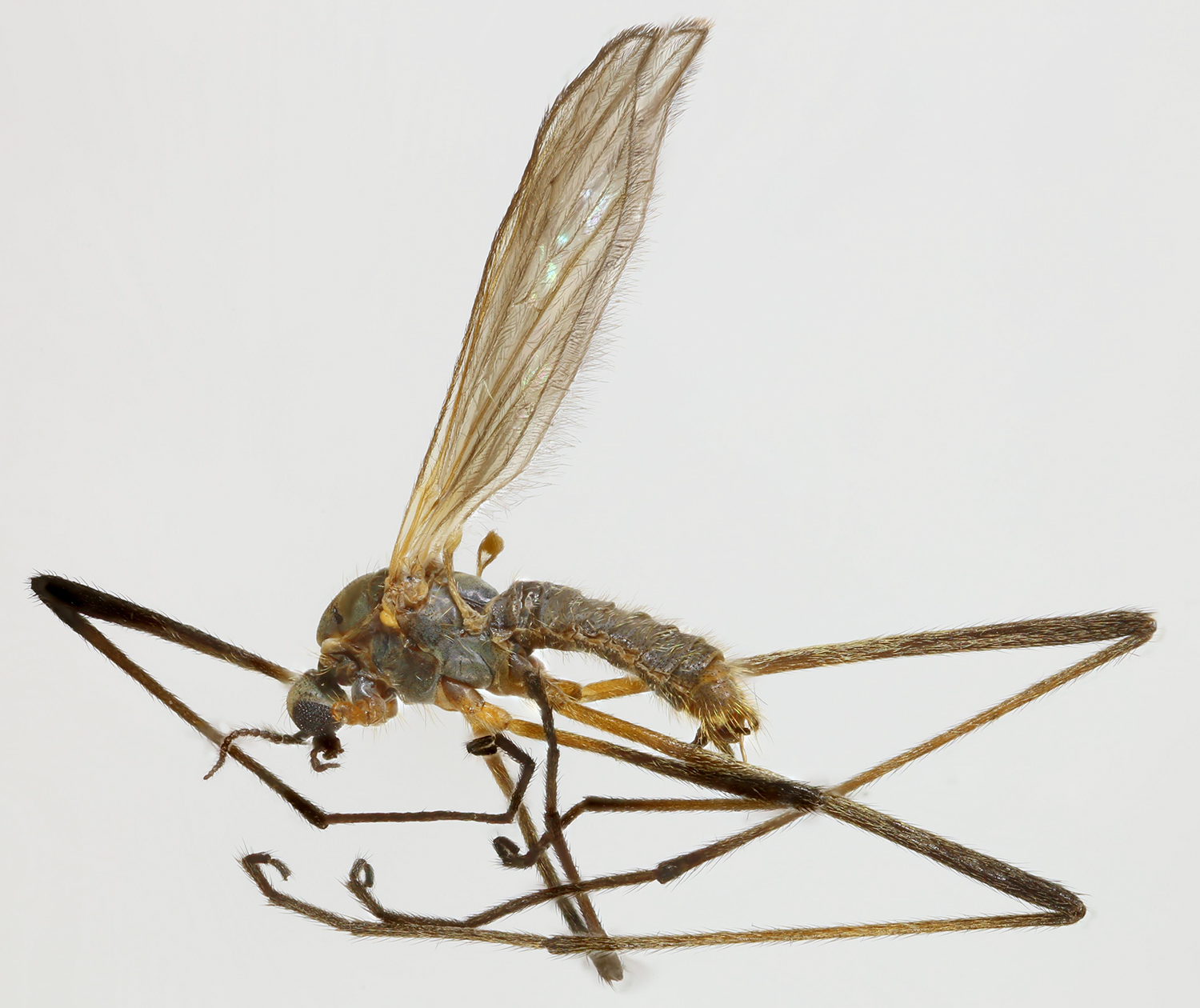
- Molophilus obscurus North Wales

Scientific classification
- Kingdom: Animalia
- Phylum: Arthropoda
- Class: Insecta
- Order: Diptera
- Family: Limoniidae
- Genus: Molophilus
- Species: M. obscurus

Binomial name
- Molophilus obscurus (Meigen, 1818)

= Molophilus obscurus =

Species of fly

Molophilus obscurus is a species of fly in the family Limoniidae. It is found in the Palearctic.
