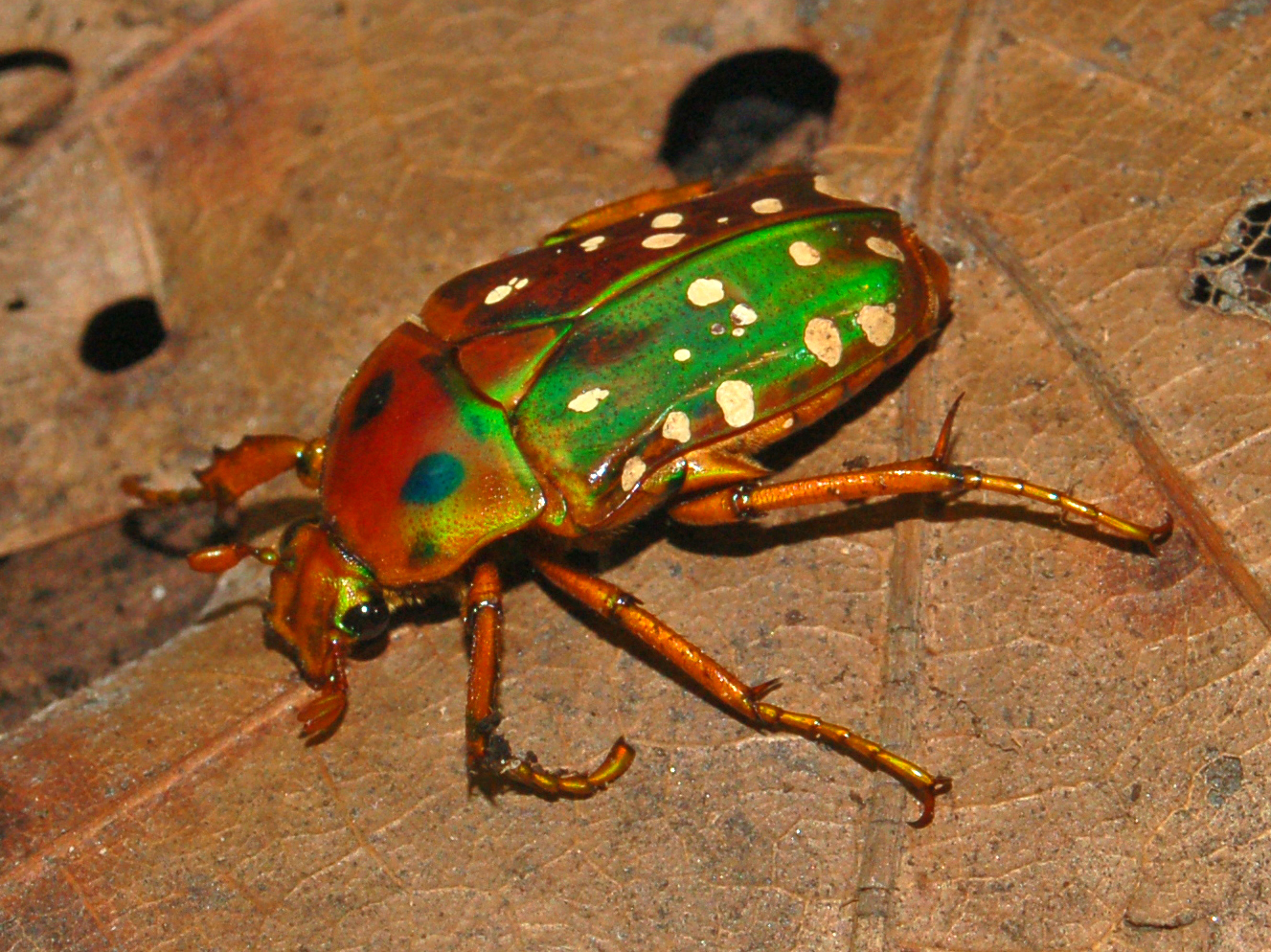
- Stephanorrhina princeps bamptoni at Montreal Insectarium

Scientific classification
- Kingdom: Animalia
- Phylum: Arthropoda
- Class: Insecta
- Order: Coleoptera
- Suborder: Polyphaga
- Infraorder: Scarabaeiformia
- Family: Scarabaeidae
- Subfamily: Cetoniinae
- Tribe: Goliathini
- Subtribe: Coryphocerina
- Genus: Stephanorrhina; Burmeister, 1842

Synonyms
- Platinocnema J. Thomson, 1880

= Stephanorrhina =

Genus of beetles

Stephanorrhina is a genus of the family Scarabaeidae, subfamily Cetoniinae and tribe Goliathini.

== Description and distribution ==
The basic colours of the species belonging to this genus vary from purple to light-green, usually with bright white spots in the elytra. The species can reach about 25 millimetres (0.98 in) in length. Usually males have two small and two large horns (sexual dimorphism). Life cycle from egg to imago takes about six-eight months, with two-four months in cocoon stage. They are present in Malawi, Tanzania, Kenya, Uganda, SW Ethiopia and Cameroon.

== List of species ==
- Stephanorrhina adelpha Kolbe, 1897
- Stephanorrhina bella (Waterhouse, 1879)
- Stephanorrhina guttata (Olivier, 1789)
- Stephanorrhina haroldi Kolbe, 1892
- Stephanorrhina isabellae Allard, 1990
- Stephanorrhina julia (Waterhouse, 1879)
- Stephanorrhina neumanni (Kolbe, 1897)
- Stephanorrhina princeps Oberthür, 1880
- Stephanorrhina simillima (Westwood, 1842)
- Stephanorrhina simplex Péringuey, 1907
- Stephanorrhina tibialis (Waterhouse, 1879)
