= Hesperoconopa =

Scientific classification
- Kingdom: Animalia
- Phylum: Arthropoda
- Class: Insecta
- Order: Diptera
- Family: Limoniidae
- Tribe: Eriopterini
- Genus: Hesperoconopa; Alexander, 1948

Type species
- Gnophomyia aperta Coquillett, 1905

Species
- see text

Genus of flies

Hesperoconopa is a genus of crane fly in the family Limoniidae.

== Distribution ==
North America, India and the Russian Far East.

== Species ==
- H. acutistyla Savchenko, 1980
- H. anthracina Alexander, 1976
- H. aperta (Coquillett, 1905)
- H. dolichophallus (Alexander, 1948)
- H. melanderi (Alexander, 1945)
- H. pilipennis (Alexander, 1918)
- H. pugilis (Alexander, 1952)
- H. sikkimensis Alexander, 1962
