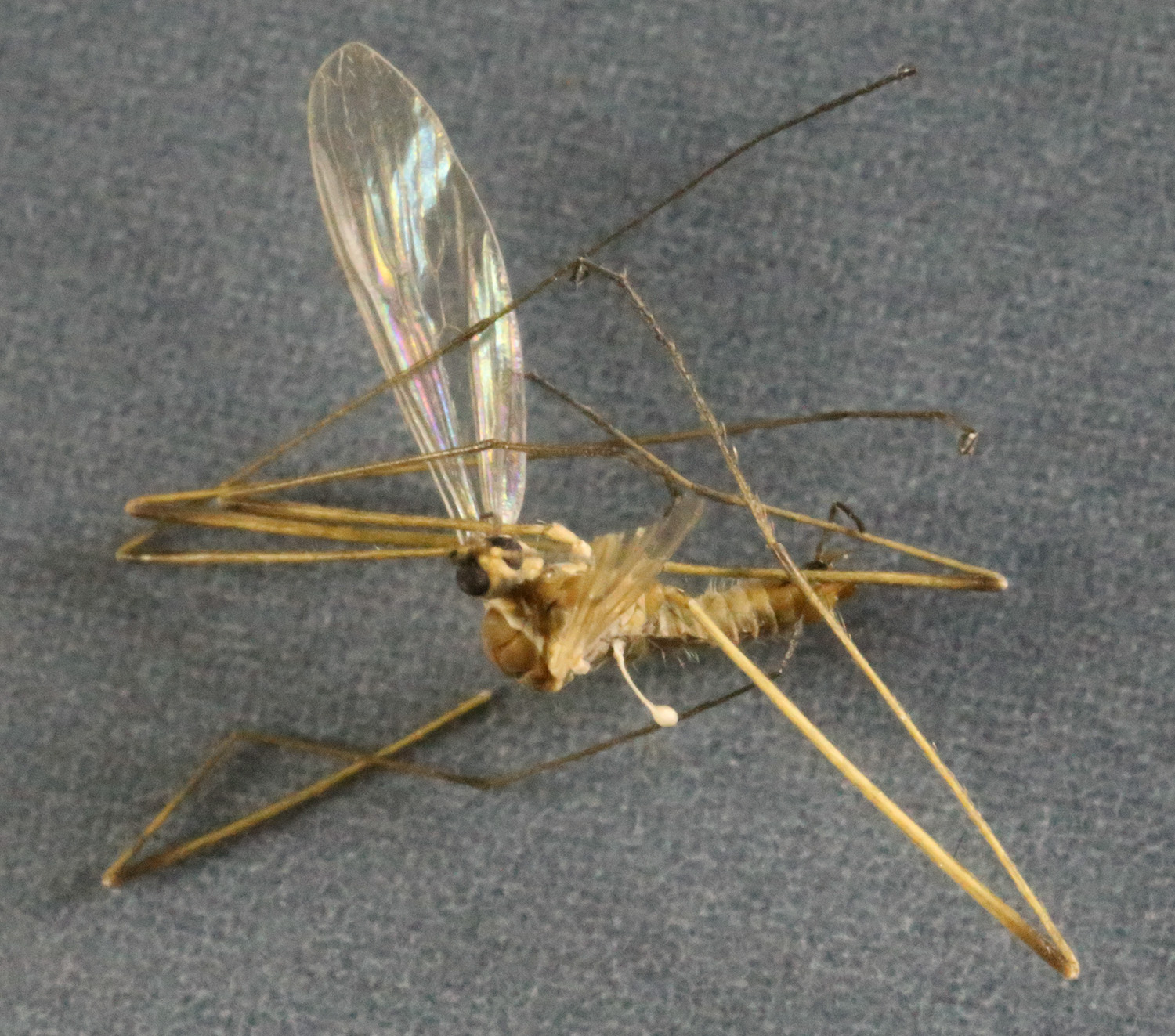
- Molophilus griseus North Wales

Scientific classification
- Kingdom: Animalia
- Phylum: Arthropoda
- Class: Insecta
- Order: Diptera
- Family: Limoniidae
- Genus: Molophilus
- Species: M. griseus

Binomial name
- Molophilus griseus (Meigen, 1804)

= Molophilus griseus =

Species of fly

Molophilus griseus is a species of fly in the family Limoniidae. It is found in the Palearctic.
