= Phantolabis =

Scientific classification
- Kingdom: Animalia
- Phylum: Arthropoda
- Class: Insecta
- Order: Diptera
- Family: Limoniidae
- Tribe: Eriopterini
- Genus: Phantolabis; Alexander, 1956

Type species
- Erioptera lacustris Alexander, 1938

Species
- see text

Genus of flies

Phantolabis is a genus of crane fly in the family Limoniidae.

== Distribution ==
Michigan, United States.

== Species ==
- N. lacustris (Alexander, 1938)
