= Molophilus pollex =

Scientific classification
- Kingdom: Animalia
- Phylum: Arthropoda
- Class: Insecta
- Order: Diptera
- Family: Limoniidae
- Genus: Molophilus
- Species: M. pollex

Binomial name
- Molophilus pollex Alexander, 1931

Species of fly

Molophilus pollex is a special of fly in the family Limoniidae.
