= Neocladura =

Scientific classification
- Kingdom: Animalia
- Phylum: Arthropoda
- Class: Insecta
- Order: Diptera
- Family: Limoniidae
- Tribe: Eriopterini
- Genus: Neocladura; Alexander, 1920

Type species
- Cladura delicatula Alexander, 1914

Species
- see text

Genus of flies

Neocladura is a genus of crane fly in the family Limoniidae.

== Distribution ==
United States and Canada

== Species ==
- N. americana (Alexander, 1917)
- N. delicatula (Alexander, 1914)
