= Arctoconopa =

Scientific classification
- Kingdom: Animalia
- Phylum: Arthropoda
- Class: Insecta
- Order: Diptera
- Family: Limoniidae
- Tribe: Eriopterini
- Genus: Arctoconopa; Alexander, 1955

Type species
- Psiloconopa forcipata Lundstrom, 1915

Genus of flies

Arctoconopa is a genus of crane fly in the family Limoniidae.

== Species ==
- A. aldrichi (Alexander, 1924)
- A. australis Savchenko, 1982
- A. bifurcata (Alexander, 1919)
- A. carbonipes (Alexander, 1929)
- A. cinctipennis (Alexander, 1918)
- A. forcipata (Lundstrom, 1915)
- A. insulana Savchenko, 1971
- A. kluane (Alexander, 1955)
- A. manitobensis (Alexander, 1929)
- A. megaura (Alexander, 1932)
- A. melampodia (Loew, 1873)
- A. obscuripes (Zetterstedt, 1851)
- A. pahasapa (Alexander, 1955)
- A. painteri (Alexander, 1929)
- A. quadrivittata (Siebke, 1872)
- A. taimyrensis (Lackschewitz, 1964)
- A. zonata (Zetterstedt, 1851)
