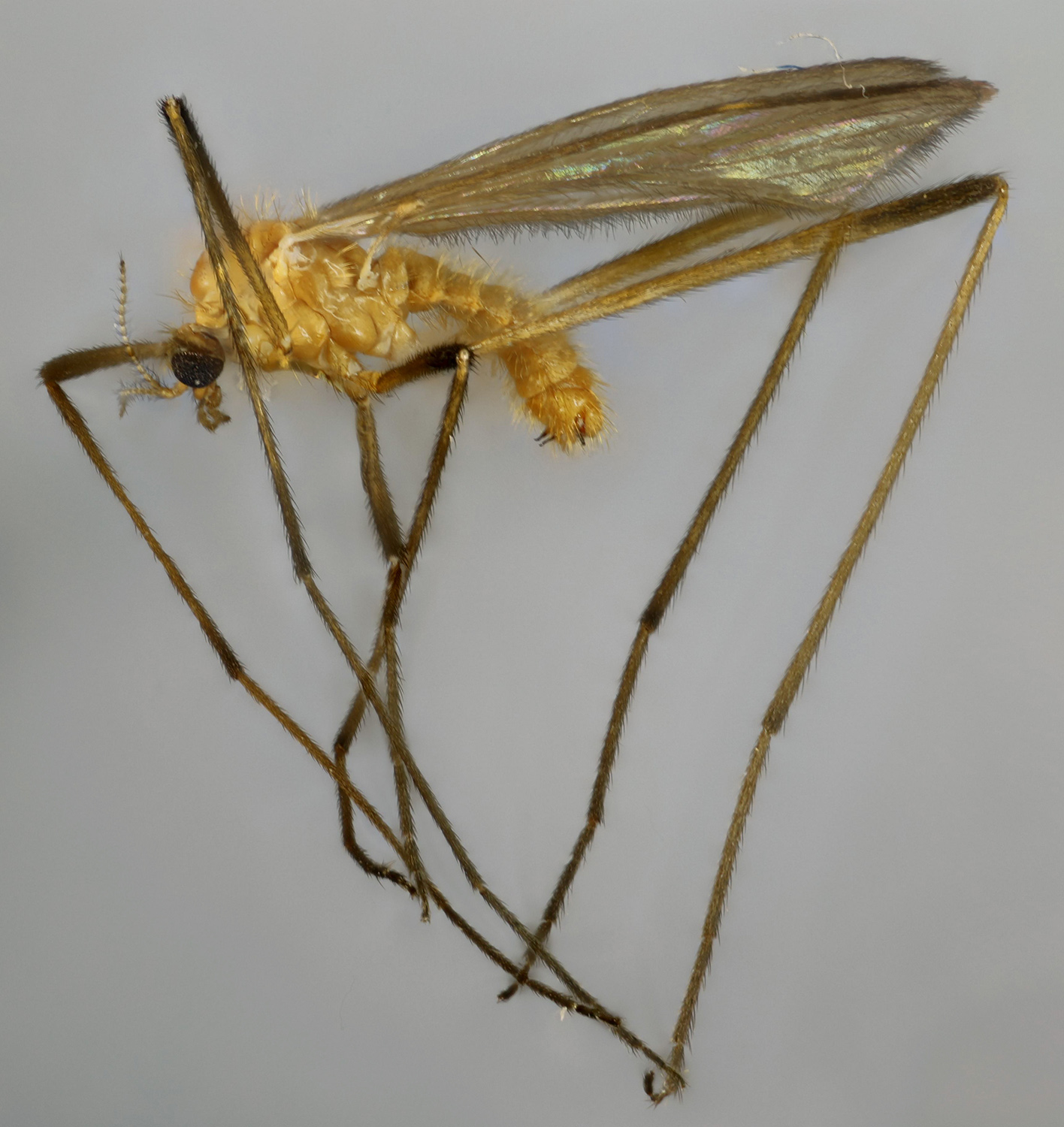
- Molophilus flavus North Wales

Scientific classification
- Kingdom: Animalia
- Phylum: Arthropoda
- Class: Insecta
- Order: Diptera
- Family: Limoniidae
- Genus: Molophilus
- Species: M. flavus

Binomial name
- Molophilus flavus Goetghebuer, 1920

= Molophilus flavus =

Species of fly

Molophilus flavus is a species of fly in the family Limoniidae. It is found in the Palearctic.
