= Sigmatomera =

Scientific classification
- Kingdom: Animalia
- Phylum: Arthropoda
- Class: Insecta
- Order: Diptera
- Family: Limoniidae
- Tribe: Eriopterini
- Genus: Sigmatomera; Osten Sacken, 1869

Type species
- Sigmatomera flavipennis Osten Sacken, 1873

Subgenera
- Austrolimnobia Alexander, 1922; Eufurina Alexander, 1946; Sigmatomera Osten Sacken, 1869

Genus of flies

Sigmatomera is a genus of crane fly in the family Limoniidae.

== Distribution ==
Southern part of North America, South America & Australasia.

== Species ==
- Subgenus Austrolimnobia Alexander, 1922
  - S. bullocki (Alexander, 1936)
  - S. magnifica (Alexander, 1913)
  - S. maiae (Alexander, 1929)
  - S. plaumanniana Alexander, 1938
  - S. rarissima Alexander, 1941
  - S. rufa (Hudson, 1895)
  - S. spectabilis (Alexander, 1922)
  - S. victoriae (Alexander, 1924)
  - S. woytkowskiana Alexander, 1941
- Subgenus Eufurina Alexander, 1946
  - S. rufithorax (Wiedemann, 1828)
- Subgenus Sigmatomera Osten Sacken, 1869
  - S. aequinoctialis Alexander, 1937
  - S. amazonica Westwood, 1881
  - S. angustirostris Alexander, 1947
  - S. apicalis Alexander, 1914
  - S. beebei Alexander, 1950
  - S. felix Alexander, 1957
  - S. flavipennis Osten Sacken, 1873
  - S. geijskesana Alexander, 1946
  - S. occulta Alexander, 1914
  - S. pictipennis Alexander, 1937
  - S. seguyi Alexander, 1929
  - S. shannoniana Alexander, 1929
  - S. varicornis Alexander, 1936
