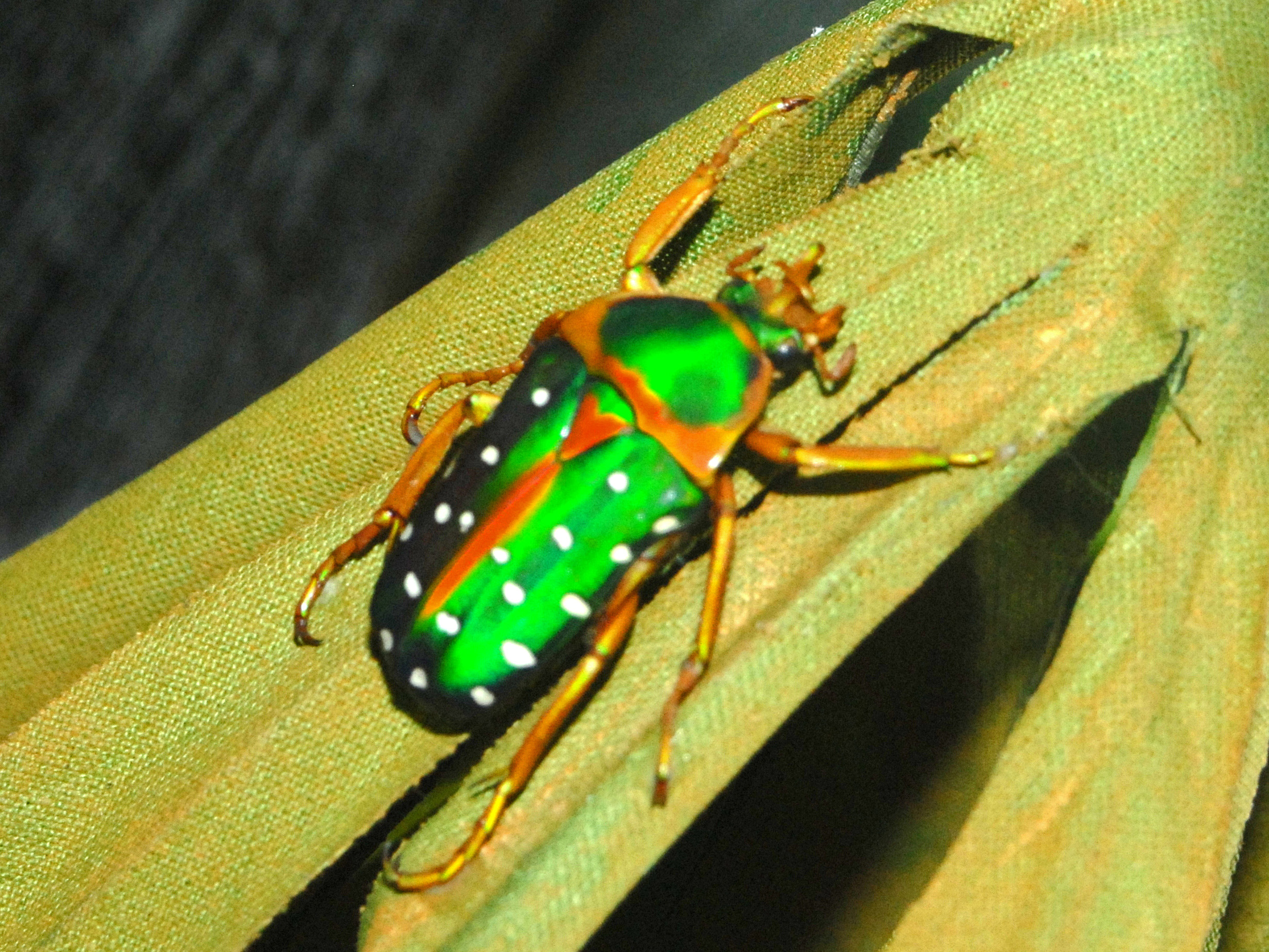
- Mounted specimen at the Museo Civico di Storia Naturale di Milano

Scientific classification
- Kingdom: Animalia
- Phylum: Arthropoda
- Clade: Pancrustacea
- Class: Insecta
- Order: Coleoptera
- Suborder: Polyphaga
- Infraorder: Scarabaeiformia
- Family: Scarabaeidae
- Genus: Stephanorrhina
- Species: S. guttata

Binomial name
- Stephanorrhina guttata (Olivier, 1789)

= Stephanorrhina guttata =

Species of beetle

Stephanorrhina guttata, common name spotted flower beetle, is a species of beetles of the family Scarabaeidae, subfamily Cetoniinae and tribe Goliathini.

== Description ==
Stephanorrhina guttata can reach about 25 millimetres (0.98 in) in length. It has a brilliant metallic green and red coloration, with white spots on the elytra.

== Distribution ==
This species occurs in Cameroon and Nigeria.

== Subspecies ==
- Stephanorrhina guttata aschantica Schürhoff, 1942
- Stephanorrhina guttata colini Schürhoff, 1942
- Stephanorrhina guttata insularis Allard, 1989
- Stephanorrhina guttata meridionalis Allard, 1991
- Stephanorrhina guttata uelensis Allard, 1991
