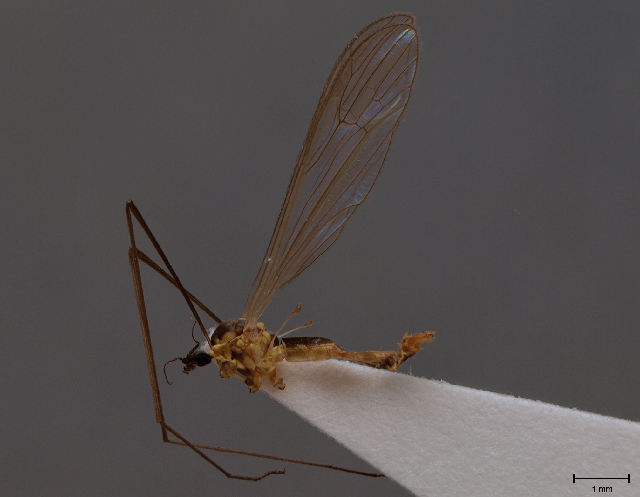
- Gonomyia securiformis

Scientific classification
- Kingdom: Animalia
- Phylum: Arthropoda
- Class: Insecta
- Order: Diptera
- Family: Limoniidae
- Tribe: Eriopterini
- Genus: Gonomyia; Meigen, 1818

Type species
- Limnobia tenella Meigen, 1818

Species
- Gonomyia Meigen, 1818; Gonomyina Alexander, 1946; Idiocerodes Savchenko, 1972; Leiponeura Skuse, 1890; Megalipophleps Alexander, 1971; Neolipophleps Alexander, 1947; Paralipophleps Alexander, 1947; Prolipophleps Savchenko, 1972; Teuchogonomyia Alexander, 1968

= Gonomyia =

Genus of flies

Gonomyia is a genus of crane fly in the family Limoniidae.

== Species ==
- Subgenus Gonomyia Meigen, 1818

- G. abscondita Lackschewitz, 1935
- G. abyssa Alexander, 1946
- G. aequalis Alexander, 1916
- G. affinis Brunetti, 1912
- G. aitkeniana Alexander, 1979
- G. andicola Alexander, 1913
- G. anduzei Alexander, 1940
- G. animula Alexander, 1966
- G. anserina Alexander, 1943
- G. appendiculata Alexander, 1943
- G. aspera Alexander, 1943
- G. aymara Alexander, 1962
- G. basilobata Alexander, 1975
- G. basispina Alexander, 1979
- G. bibarbata Alexander, 1935
- G. bidentata Alexander, 1922
- G. bifida Tonnoir, 1920
- G. bifurcifer Alexander, 1939
- G. bifurcula Alexander, 1946
- G. bihamata Alexander, 1943
- G. birama Alexander, 1941
- G. brachyura Alexander, 1963
- G. brevicula Alexander, 1926
- G. brevissima Alexander, 1926
- G. bryanti Alexander, 1915
- G. callisto Alexander, 1956
- G. catamarcae Alexander, 1929
- G. chalaza Alexander, 1957
- G. chiapasensis Alexander, 1927
- G. colei Alexander, 1966
- G. connivens Alexander, 1946
- G. conoviensis Barnes, 1924
- G. copulata (Becker, 1908)
- G. crinita Alexander, 1941
- G. currani Alexander, 1926
- G. curvispina Podenas & Gelhaus, 2001
- G. dasyphallus Alexander, 1949
- G. debilis Alexander, 1928
- G. decacantha Alexander, 1957
- G. delicata Alexander, 1913
- G. dentata de Meijere, 1920
- G. dissidens Alexander, 1957
- G. dominicana Alexander, 1970
- G. dyas Alexander, 1957
- G. efficiens Alexander, 1943
- G. emphysema Alexander, 1962
- G. ericarum Alexander, 1956
- G. expansa Alexander, 1938
- G. extensivena Alexander, 1943
- G. faria Stary & Freidberg, 2007
- G. filicauda Alexander, 1916
- G. filiformis Alexander, 1948
- G. flavibasis Alexander, 1916
- G. foliacea Alexander, 1935
- G. fulvipennis Alexander, 1968
- G. furcula Alexander, 1962
- G. gemula Alexander, 1946
- G. gilvipennis Alexander, 1928
- G. gnophosoma Alexander, 1956
- G. gratilla Alexander, 1934
- G. guerreroensis Alexander, 1940
- G. hamulata Edwards, 1933
- G. harmstoni Alexander, 1948
- G. herroni Alexander, 1948
- G. hippocampi Stubbs & Geiger, 1993
- G. hirsutistyla Alexander, 1963
- G. hyperacuta Alexander, 1956
- G. idiostyla Alexander, 1970
- G. illicis Alexander, 1921
- G. impacata Alexander, 1957
- G. ingrica Lackschewitz, 1964
- G. irianensis Alexander, 1964
- G. ishana Alexander, 1961
- G. isolata Alexander, 1949
- G. jamaicana Alexander, 1964
- G. jejuna Alexander, 1916
- G. juarezi Alexander, 1946
- G. justa Alexander, 1935
- G. justifica Alexander, 1936
- G. kurokawae Alexander, 1957
- G. latifolia Alexander, 1935
- G. latilobata Alexander, 1934
- G. lobulata Savchenko, 1980
- G. longifimbriata Alexander, 1934
- G. lucidula de Meijere, 1920
- G. luteipleura Alexander, 1936
- G. mainensis Alexander, 1919
- G. malitia Alexander, 1973
- G. marini Erhan, 1985
- G. matileana Alexander, 1979
- G. matsya Alexander, 1955
- G. megarhopala Alexander, 1946
- G. mendica Alexander, 1956
- G. methodica Alexander, 1931
- G. mexicana Alexander, 1916
- G. microserrata Alexander, 1938
- G. mimetica Alexander, 1921
- G. modica Savchenko, 1972
- G. multiacuta Alexander, 1963
- G. multispicata Alexander, 1938
- G. nansei Alexander, 1930
- G. napoensis Alexander, 1979
- G. nebulicola Alexander, 1932
- G. necopina Alexander, 1957
- G. nigrotuberculata Savchenko, 1986
- G. nubeculosa de Meijere, 1911
- G. obscuriclava Alexander, 1934
- G. octospinosa Alexander, 1936
- G. odontostyla Savchenko, 1972
- G. omeiensis Alexander, 1930
- G. omogoensis Alexander, 1955
- G. ostentator Alexander, 1946
- G. otiosa Alexander, 1949
- G. oxybeles Alexander, 1979
- G. paiuta Alexander, 1948
- G. papposa Savchenko, 1983
- G. parvicellula (Brunetti, 1918)
- G. parvistyla Alexander, 1979
- G. pauaiensis Alexander, 1934
- G. pauliana Nielsen, 1966
- G. pensilis Alexander, 1957
- G. percomplexa Alexander, 1946
- G. periploca Alexander, 1963
- G. pilosistyla Alexander & Alexander, 1973
- G. platymerina Alexander, 1944
- G. platymeroides Alexander, 1952
- G. poliocephala Alexander, 1924
- G. principalis Alexander, 1938
- G. quaesita Alexander, 1938
- G. queribunda Alexander, 1941
- G. ravana Alexander, 1962
- G. recta Tonnoir, 1920
- G. rectangular Alexander, 1966
- G. remigera Alexander, 1946
- G. remota Alexander, 1926
- G. resoluta Alexander, 1950
- G. rhicnacantha Alexander, 1957
- G. salmani Alexander, 1927
- G. sejuncta Alexander, 1970
- G. sekiana Alexander, 1934
- G. serendibensis Alexander, 1958
- G. serpentigera Savchenko, 1983
- G. serpentina Alexander, 1938
- G. sexlobata Savchenko, 1978
- G. sibyna Alexander, 1962
- G. sicula Lackschewitz, 1940
- G. simplex Tonnoir, 1920
- G. sparsisetosa Alexander, 1960
- G. spiculistyla Alexander, 1950
- G. spinifer Alexander, 1918
- G. spinula Savchenko, 1983
- G. stackelbergi Lackschewitz, 1935
- G. stellata Alexander, 1946
- G. stenorhabda Alexander, 1969
- G. stylacantha Alexander, 1969
- G. subaffinis Alexander, 1968
- G. subappendiculata Alexander, 1954
- G. subbrevicula Alexander, 1947
- G. subcinerea Osten Sacken, 1860
- G. subremota Alexander, 1938
- G. subtenella Savchenko, 1972
- G. subunicolor Alexander, 1948
- G. superba Alexander, 1913
- G. symmetrica Edwards, 1926
- G. syrraxis Alexander, 1955
- G. taeniata Alexander, 1927
- G. tanaocantha Alexander, 1963
- G. tenella (Meigen, 1818)
- G. teucheres Alexander, 1957
- G. theowaldi Stary, 1982
- G. triaculeata Alexander, 1938
- G. triformis Alexander, 1946
- G. tristylata Savchenko, 1983
- G. turritella Alexander, 1959
- G. unicolor Alexander, 1913
- G. unispicata Alexander, 1956
- G. vafra Alexander, 1945
- G. vana Savchenko, 1980
- G. varipes Alexander, 1914
- G. versicolor Alexander, 1934
- G. virgata Doane, 1900
- G. wygodzinskyi Alexander, 1962
- G. yama Alexander, 1962

- Subgenus Gonomyina Alexander, 1946

- G. durabilis Alexander, 1946
- G. parishi (Alexander, 1913)
- G. persimilis (Alexander, 1920)
- G. runa Alexander, 1947

- Subgenus Idiocerodes Savchenko, 1972

- G. aperta Brunetti, 1912
- G. armigera Alexander, 1922
- G. cognatella Osten Sacken, 1860
- G. concinna Lackschewitz, 1940
- G. diabarica Savchenko, 1972
- G. florens Alexander, 1916
- G. kansensis Alexander, 1918
- G. pleurolineola Alexander, 1957
- G. reflexa Alexander, 1927
- G. subaperta Alexander, 1957
- G. subcognatella Alexander, 1932

- Subgenus Leiponeura Skuse, 1890

- G. acanthomelana Alexander, 1970
- G. acanthophallus Alexander, 1931
- G. acus Alexander, 1936
- G. acuspinosa Alexander, 1934
- G. adamsoni Alexander, 1932
- G. adunca Alexander, 1921
- G. aegina Alexander, 1948
- G. alboannulata Alexander, 1931
- G. ambiens Alexander, 1950
- G. amblystyla Alexander, 1968
- G. anduzeana Alexander, 1941
- G. angulifera Alexander, 1933
- G. anxia Alexander, 1934
- G. apiculata Alexander, 1960
- G. aquila Alexander, 1934
- G. arajuno Alexander, 1946
- G. atrox Alexander, 1937
- G. auchetes Alexander, 1962
- G. austrotropica Theischinger, 1999
- G. baiame Theischinger, 1994
- G. banksiana Alexander, 1924
- G. basicuspis Alexander, 1948
- G. basispinosa Alexander, 1937
- G. basistylata Alexander, 1979
- G. bata Alexander, 1975
- G. batesi Alexander, 1945
- G. biaculeata Alexander, 1938
- G. bibula (Wiedemann, 1828)
- G. bicircularis Alexander, 1962
- G. bicolorata Alexander, 1930
- G. bicornuta Alexander, 1927
- G. biensis Alexander, 1978
- G. bifiligera Alexander, 1933
- G. bigeminata Alexander, 1962
- G. bilobata Alexander, 1960
- G. bimucronata Alexander, 1941
- G. biserpentigera Alexander, 1948
- G. bispina Alexander, 1924
- G. bispinosa Alexander, 1921
- G. boki Alexander, 1976
- G. borburatana Alexander, 1941
- G. bougainvilleae Alexander, 1950
- G. brachyglossa Alexander, 1948
- G. brevivena (Skuse, 1890)
- G. bruchi Alexander, 1920
- G. burgessi Alexander, 1944
- G. cairnensis Alexander, 1920
- G. calverti Alexander, 1914
- G. calyce Alexander, 1956
- G. cantareirae Alexander, 1945
- G. capnitis Alexander, 1948
- G. carrerai Alexander, 1943
- G. carsiostyla Alexander, 1971
- G. cervaria Alexander, 1938
- G. circumcincta Alexander, 1924
- G. citribasis Alexander, 1948
- G. clavifera Alexander, 1943
- G. complicata Alexander, 1979
- G. conjugens Senior-White, 1922
- G. conquisita Alexander, 1936
- G. cooloola Theischinger, 1994
- G. crepuscula Alexander, 1921
- G. cryophila Alexander, 1961
- G. ctenophora Alexander, 1921
- G. cubana Alexander, 1931
- G. cultrata Alexander, 1941
- G. curvistyla Alexander, 1961
- G. curvistylata Alexander, 1981
- G. degeneri Alexander, 1956
- G. diacantha Alexander, 1934
- G. diacanthophora Alexander, 1941
- G. diffusa (de Meijere, 1911)
- G. digitifera Alexander, 1924
- G. dipterophora Alexander, 1948
- G. dischidia Alexander, 1978
- G. discreta Alexander, 1932
- G. dispar Alexander, 1962
- G. dissimilis Alexander, 1961
- G. distenta Alexander, 1953
- G. dosis Alexander, 1955
- G. dotata Alexander, 1945
- G. duurvoorti Alexander, 1929
- G. edo Alexander, 1976
- G. ekiti Alexander, 1974
- G. elachistos Alexander, 1956
- G. esakiella Alexander, 1940
- G. extensa Alexander, 1914
- G. fijiensis Alexander, 1914
- G. fimbriata Alexander, 1959
- G. flavidapex Edwards, 1927
- G. flavocostalis Alexander, 1924
- G. flavomarginata Brunetti, 1912
- G. flavonotata (Edwards, 1912)
- G. fortibasis Alexander, 1967
- G. furcilla Alexander, 1953
- G. furcillata Alexander, 1956
- G. fuscofemorata Alexander, 1961
- G. fuscohalterata Alexander, 1926
- G. fuscoscutellata Alexander, 1933
- G. gillottae Alexander, 1929
- G. gressitti Alexander, 1935
- G. gressittiana Alexander, 1972
- G. hackeri Edwards, 1928
- G. haploa Alexander, 1926
- G. haploides Alexander, 1938
- G. hawaiiensis Alexander, 1919
- G. hedys Alexander, 1958
- G. helotos Alexander, 1971
- G. hestica Alexander, 1968
- G. hodgkini Alexander, 1950
- G. hoffmaniana Alexander, 1947
- G. horrifica Alexander, 1938
- G. houtensis Alexander, 1964
- G. hyperion Alexander, 1956
- G. ibo Alexander, 1974
- G. impedita Alexander, 1946
- G. inaequistyla Alexander, 1934
- G. incompleta Brunetti, 1912
- G. inermis Alexander, 1914
- G. inquisita Alexander, 1937
- G. insolita Alexander, 1979
- G. intrepida Alexander, 1940
- G. ischyria Alexander, 1948
- G. iyala Alexander, 1976
- G. jacobsoniana Alexander, 1934
- G. juquiana Alexander, 1945
- G. jurata Alexander, 1936
- G. kama Alexander, 1963
- G. kamballa Theischinger, 1994
- G. katangae Alexander, 1937
- G. kertesziana Alexander, 1934
- G. kiandra Theischinger, 1994
- G. kraussi Alexander, 1956
- G. lamellaris (Speiser, 1913)
- G. lanka Alexander, 1958
- G. leonura Alexander, 1941
- G. leucomelania Alexander, 1931
- G. liberiensis Alexander, 1930
- G. longiradialis Alexander, 1930
- G. longispina Alexander, 1922
- G. ludibunda Alexander, 1926
- G. lustralis Alexander, 1945
- G. luteimarginata Alexander, 1931
- G. lyra Alexander, 1935
- G. macilenta Alexander, 1932
- G. macintyrei Alexander, 1937
- G. macswaini Alexander, 1940
- G. mambila Alexander, 1975
- G. manca Osten Sacken, 1869
- G. maquilingia Alexander, 1931
- G. marquesana Alexander, 1932
- G. mascarena Alexander, 1921
- G. mashona Alexander, 1959
- G. maya Alexander, 1927
- G. mecophallus Alexander, 1966
- G. medleri Alexander, 1972
- G. melanacantha Alexander, 1954
- G. melanorhyncha Savchenko, 1987
- G. melanostyla Alexander, 1962
- G. mesoneura Alexander, 1931
- G. metallescens Edwards, 1927
- G. milangensis Alexander, 1960
- G. minutistyla Alexander, 1969
- G. misera Alexander, 1921
- G. mitophora Alexander, 1935
- G. mizoensis Alexander, 1963
- G. molokaiensis Hardy, 1953
- G. moma Theischinger, 1994
- G. monura Alexander, 1961
- G. mumfordi Alexander, 1932
- G. mundewudda Theischinger, 1994
- G. mythica Alexander, 1945
- G. naiadifera Edwards, 1927
- G. narasinha Alexander, 1955
- G. nebulosa (de Meijere, 1911)
- G. neonebulosa Alexander, 1930
- G. nestor Alexander, 1947
- G. nexosa Alexander, 1958
- G. nigridorsata Alexander, 1936
- G. nigrohalterata Edwards, 1923
- G. nilgiriensis Alexander, 1964
- G. nissoriana Alexander, 1936
- G. noctabunda Alexander, 1920
- G. novocaledoniae Alexander, 1945
- G. nyasae Alexander, 1920
- G. ocypete Alexander, 1948
- G. oliveri Alexander, 1924
- G. onya Theischinger, 1994
- G. oolyarra Theischinger, 1994
- G. ophion Alexander, 1948
- G. ornatipes (Brunetti, 1912)
- G. orthomera Alexander, 1937
- G. orthomeroides Alexander, 1939
- G. pachymera Alexander, 1975
- G. pacifica Edwards, 1928
- G. pallicostata Alexander, 1936
- G. pallidisignata Alexander, 1931
- G. pararamifera Alexander, 1960
- G. parinermis Alexander, 1940
- G. parvispinosa Alexander, 1938
- G. pedica Alexander, 1947
- G. pentacantha Alexander, 1967
- G. perattenuata Alexander, 1976
- G. perpicta Alexander, 1948
- G. perreducta Alexander, 1934
- G. perscabrosa Alexander, 1961
- G. perssoni Alexander, 1978
- G. pervilis Alexander, 1935
- G. petronis Alexander, 1942
- G. philomela Alexander, 1945
- G. phoracantha Alexander, 1938
- G. phoroctenia Alexander, 1921
- G. pietatis Alexander, 1940
- G. pilifera (de Meijere, 1911)
- G. pilosispina Alexander, 1937
- G. pinivagata Alexander, 1934
- G. pino Theischinger, 1994
- G. piscator Theischinger, 1999
- G. platyphallus Alexander, 1971
- G. pleurostriata Alexander, 1936
- G. pontifex Alexander, 1953
- G. porrecta Alexander, 1978
- G. praedita Alexander, 1935
- G. pratapi Alexander, 1958
- G. producta Alexander, 1919
- G. projecta Alexander, 1941
- G. prolixistylus Alexander, 1930
- G. prolongata Alexander, 1940
- G. protenta Alexander, 1978
- G. puckowe Theischinger, 1994
- G. puella (Williston, 1896)
- G. puer Alexander, 1913
- G. pulchripes Alexander, 1921
- G. pulvinifera Alexander, 1936
- G. punctigera Alexander, 1933
- G. pusilla (Lackschewitz, 1964)
- G. pyensoni Alexander, 1939
- G. quadrifila Alexander, 1930
- G. quadrifilaris Alexander, 1960
- G. queenslandica Alexander, 1920
- G. ramifera Alexander, 1934
- G. ramus Alexander, 1943
- G. rastriformis Alexander, 1946
- G. reclinata Alexander, 1962
- G. recurvata Alexander, 1914
- G. recurvispina Alexander, 1948
- G. reyesi Alexander, 1946
- G. rhadinostyla Alexander, 1964
- G. robinsoni Edwards, 1928
- G. rogeziana Alexander, 1953
- G. sacandaga Alexander, 1914
- G. sagittifera Alexander, 1932
- G. sana Alexander, 1936
- G. sandersi Alexander, 1931
- G. saudiarabiensis Hancock, 1997
- G. sauteri Alexander, 1930
- G. scelerata Alexander, 1945
- G. scimitar Alexander, 1914
- G. scythra Alexander, 1960
- G. secespita Alexander, 1937
- G. secreta Alexander, 1931
- G. senaria Alexander, 1943
- G. siculifera Alexander, 1961
- G. silinda Alexander, 1957
- G. sinuosa Alexander, 1930
- G. sircari Alexander, 1936
- G. skusei Alexander, 1919
- G. sobrina Alexander, 1920
- G. sparsipuncta Alexander, 1948
- G. speratina Alexander, 1968
- G. spicata Alexander, 1921
- G. spiniterga Alexander, 1948
- G. spinolateralis Alexander, 1971
- G. subacus Alexander, 1962
- G. subaegina Alexander, 1962
- G. subanxia Alexander, 1937
- G. subinermis Alexander, 1939
- G. sublustralis Alexander, 1967
- G. subnebulosa Edwards, 1928
- G. subpilifera Alexander, 1934
- G. subramifera Alexander, 1960
- G. subscimitar Alexander, 1946
- G. subterminalis Alexander, 1927
- G. subtribulator Alexander, 1943
- G. subtroilus Alexander, 1967
- G. sulphurella Osten Sacken, 1860
- G. supplicata Alexander, 1965
- G. tafiensis Alexander, 1962
- G. tahitiensis Alexander, 1933
- G. tatei Alexander, 1960
- G. tenuipollex Alexander, 1948
- G. tenuistylus Alexander, 1926
- G. tergofimbriata Alexander, 1929
- G. tergospinosa Alexander, 1975
- G. terraereginae Alexander, 1921
- G. tersa Alexander, 1949
- G. tetrastyla Alexander, 1950
- G. thambaroo Theischinger, 1994
- G. threnodes Alexander, 1956
- G. toala Alexander, 1935
- G. tonnoirella Alexander, 1933
- G. toraja Alexander, 1935
- G. trepida Alexander, 1962
- G. tribulator Alexander, 1942
- G. trionyx Alexander, 1949
- G. tristigmata Alexander, 1932
- G. tristyla Alexander, 1958
- G. troilus Alexander, 1949
- G. unicornuta Alexander, 1956
- G. usherae Alexander, 1960
- G. vanuana Alexander, 1956
- G. varsha Alexander, 1963
- G. vehemens Alexander, 1949
- G. victorina Alexander, 1956
- G. vindex Alexander, 1941
- G. walkeri Theischinger, 1996
- G. walshae Alexander, 1934
- G. wunda Theischinger, 1994
- G. xanthophleps Alexander, 1962
- G. yapensis Alexander, 1972
- G. yemenensis Hancock, 2006
- G. zimmermani Alexander, 1956

- Subgenus Megalipophleps Alexander, 1971

- G. dicranura Edwards, 1928
- G. labidura Edwards, 1928
- G. nigripennis Edwards, 1928

- Subgenus Neolipophleps Alexander, 1947

- G. acuminata Alexander, 1921
- G. aequidens Alexander, 1938
- G. aequispinosa Alexander, 1926
- G. alexanderi (Johnson, 1912)
- G. cinerea (Doane, 1900)
- G. condensa Alexander, 1938
- G. extenuata Alexander, 1945
- G. falcifer Alexander, 1921
- G. glabrispina Alexander, 1926
- G. helophila Alexander, 1916
- G. machaeria Alexander, 1921
- G. monacantha Alexander, 1937
- G. neofalcifer Alexander, 1943
- G. platymera Alexander, 1939
- G. schadeana Alexander, 1935
- G. strigilis Alexander, 1926
- G. subfalcifer Alexander, 1922
- G. topoensis Alexander, 1952
- G. trispinosa Alexander, 1921

- Subgenus Paralipophleps Alexander, 1947

- G. aitkeni Alexander, 1971
- G. amazona Alexander, 1912
- G. cultriformis Alexander, 1970
- G. dikopis Alexander, 1970
- G. diplacantha Alexander, 1967
- G. gladiator Alexander, 1919
- G. guayaquilensis Alexander, 1938
- G. heteromera Alexander, 1942
- G. indotata Alexander, 1966
- G. latistyla Alexander, 1926
- G. lemniscata Alexander, 1931
- G. micracantha Alexander, 1926
- G. micromera Alexander, 1945
- G. neobifida Alexander, 1953
- G. peracuta Alexander, 1928
- G. pleuralis (Williston, 1896)
- G. spinistyla Alexander, 1926
- G. uncinata Alexander, 1969
- G. wirthiana Alexander, 1970

- Subgenus Prolipophleps Savchenko, 1972

- G. abbreviata Loew, 1873
- G. brachiostyla Savchenko, 1972
- G. divergens Bangerter, 1947
- G. elimata Alexander, 1957
- G. funesta Alexander, 1936
- G. gracilistylus Alexander, 1924
- G. reducta Bangerter, 1947

- Subgenus Teuchogonomyia Alexander, 1968

- G. aciculifera Alexander, 1919
- G. curvistyla Savchenko, 1982
- G. edwardsi Lackschewitz, 1925
- G. horribilis Alexander, 1941
- G. ithyphallus Lackschewitz, 1935
- G. noveboracensis Alexander, 1916
- G. quadrilobata Savchenko, 1983
- G. sevierensis Alexander, 1948
- G. tetonensis Alexander, 1946
