= Lipsothrix nigristigma =

Scientific classification
- Kingdom: Animalia
- Phylum: Arthropoda
- Class: Insecta
- Order: Diptera
- Family: Limoniidae
- Genus: Lipsothrix
- Species: L. nigristigma

Binomial name
- Lipsothrix nigristigma Edwards (1938)

Species of cranefly

Lipsothrix nigristigma is a species of cranefly in the genus Lipsothrix, native to England. It is known only from the type specimen taken in Lancashire in 1924, and from two localities near Telford in 1994.

It was identified by Edwards in 1938.

== Survey ==
In 2000, the two sites from which L. nigristigma was recorded in 1994 were resurveyed along with twenty or so similar sites in Shropshire and Montgomeryshire. The target species was located at eight (possibly nine) sites. The majority of sites are centred on southwest Telford with only two outlying sites.
