= Cryptolabis =

Scientific classification
- Kingdom: Animalia
- Phylum: Arthropoda
- Class: Insecta
- Order: Diptera
- Family: Limoniidae
- Tribe: Eriopterini
- Genus: Cryptolabis; Osten Sacken, 1860

Type species
- C. paradoxa Osten Sacken, 1860

Subgenera
- Cryptolabis Osten Sacken, 1860; Procryptolabis Alexander, 1923

Genus of flies

Cryptolabis is a genus of crane fly in the family Limoniidae.

== Species ==
- Subgenus Cryptolabis Osten Sacken, 1860
  - C. alticola Alexander, 1944
  - C. atmophora Alexander, 1929
  - C. aviformis Alexander, 1979
  - C. bidenticulata Alexander, 1949
  - C. bisinuatis Doane, 1900
  - C. brachyphallus Alexander, 1950
  - C. chilota Alexander, 1929
  - C. chiriquiana Alexander, 1969
  - C. clausula Alexander, 1969
  - C. cortesi Alexander, 1952
  - C. diversipes Alexander, 1939
  - C. ecalcarata Alexander, 1947
  - C. fuscovenosa Alexander, 1928
  - C. hilaris Alexander, 1945
  - C. invaripes Alexander, 1939
  - C. jovialis Alexander, 1945
  - C. jubilata Alexander, 1943
  - C. laddeyi Alexander, 1943
  - C. laticostata Alexander, 1940
  - C. longiradialis Alexander, 1939
  - C. luteiceps Alexander, 1927
  - C. luteicosta Alexander, 1934
  - C. luteola Alexander, 1946
  - C. magnistyla Alexander, 1962
  - C. minutula Alexander, 1927
  - C. mixta Alexander, 1949
  - C. molophiloides Alexander, 1943
  - C. monacantha Alexander, 1943
  - C. nebulicincta Alexander, 1941
  - C. pachyphallus Alexander, 1943
  - C. pallidivena Alexander, 1969
  - C. paradoxa Osten Sacken, 1860
  - C. parrai Alexander, 1946
  - C. penai Alexander, 1971
  - C. pendulifera Alexander, 1949
  - C. perdistans Alexander, 1967
  - C. phallostena Alexander, 1968
  - C. recurvata Alexander, 1942
  - C. retrorsa Alexander, 1950
  - C. roundsi Alexander, 1939
  - C. schadei Alexander, 1935
  - C. semiflava Alexander, 1949
  - C. sepulchralis Alexander, 1922
  - C. sica Alexander, 1946
  - C. sordidipes Alexander, 1943
  - C. spatulata Alexander, 1929
  - C. taciturna Alexander, 1945
  - C. tenuicincta Alexander, 1921
  - C. travassosi Alexander, 1945
  - C. tridenticulata Alexander, 1967
  - C. tropicalis Alexander, 1913
  - C. umbrosa Alexander, 1938
  - C. uniformis Alexander, 1969
  - C. vallicola Alexander, 1947
  - C. varipes Alexander, 1939
- Subgenus Procryptolabis Alexander, 1923
  - C. argentinensis Alexander, 1923
  - C. barilochensis Alexander, 1929
  - C. nigrita Alexander, 1969
  - C. pedanophallus Alexander, 1969
