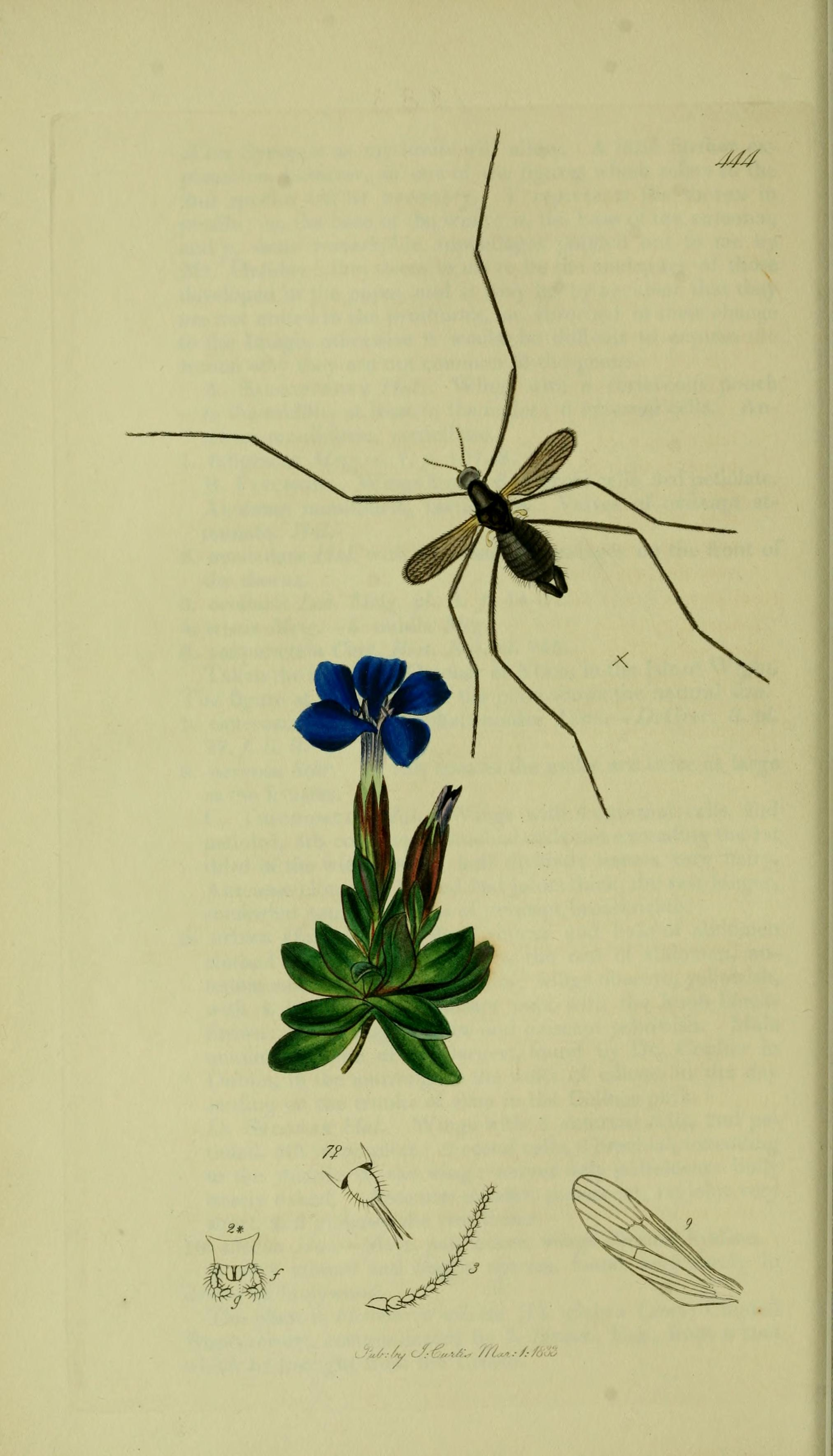
- Molophilus ater in British Entomology

Scientific classification
- Kingdom: Animalia
- Phylum: Arthropoda
- Class: Insecta
- Order: Diptera
- Family: Limoniidae
- Genus: Molophilus
- Species: M. ater

Binomial name
- Molophilus ater (Meigen, 1804)

= Molophilus ater =

Species of fly

Molophilus ater is a Palearctic species of craneflies in the family Limoniidae. It is found in a wide range of habitats and micro habitats: in earth rich in humus, in swamps and marshes, in leaf litter and in wet spots in woods.
