= Idiognophomyia =

Scientific classification
- Kingdom: Animalia
- Phylum: Arthropoda
- Class: Insecta
- Order: Diptera
- Family: Limoniidae
- Tribe: Eriopterini
- Genus: Idiognophomyia; Alexander, 1956

Type species
- Gnophomyia capicola Alexander, 1934

Species
- see text

Genus of flies

Idiognophomyia is a genus of crane fly in the family Limoniidae.

== Distribution ==
South Africa, Japan, Madagascar, China, & California.

== Species ==
- I. capicola (Alexander, 1934)
- I. collata (Alexander, 1932)
- I. comstocki (Alexander, 1947)
- I. enniki Alexander, 1975
- I. ignava (Alexander, 1920)
- I. keiseri Alexander, 1963
- I. laterospinosa (Alexander, 1928)
- I. patula Alexander, 1960
