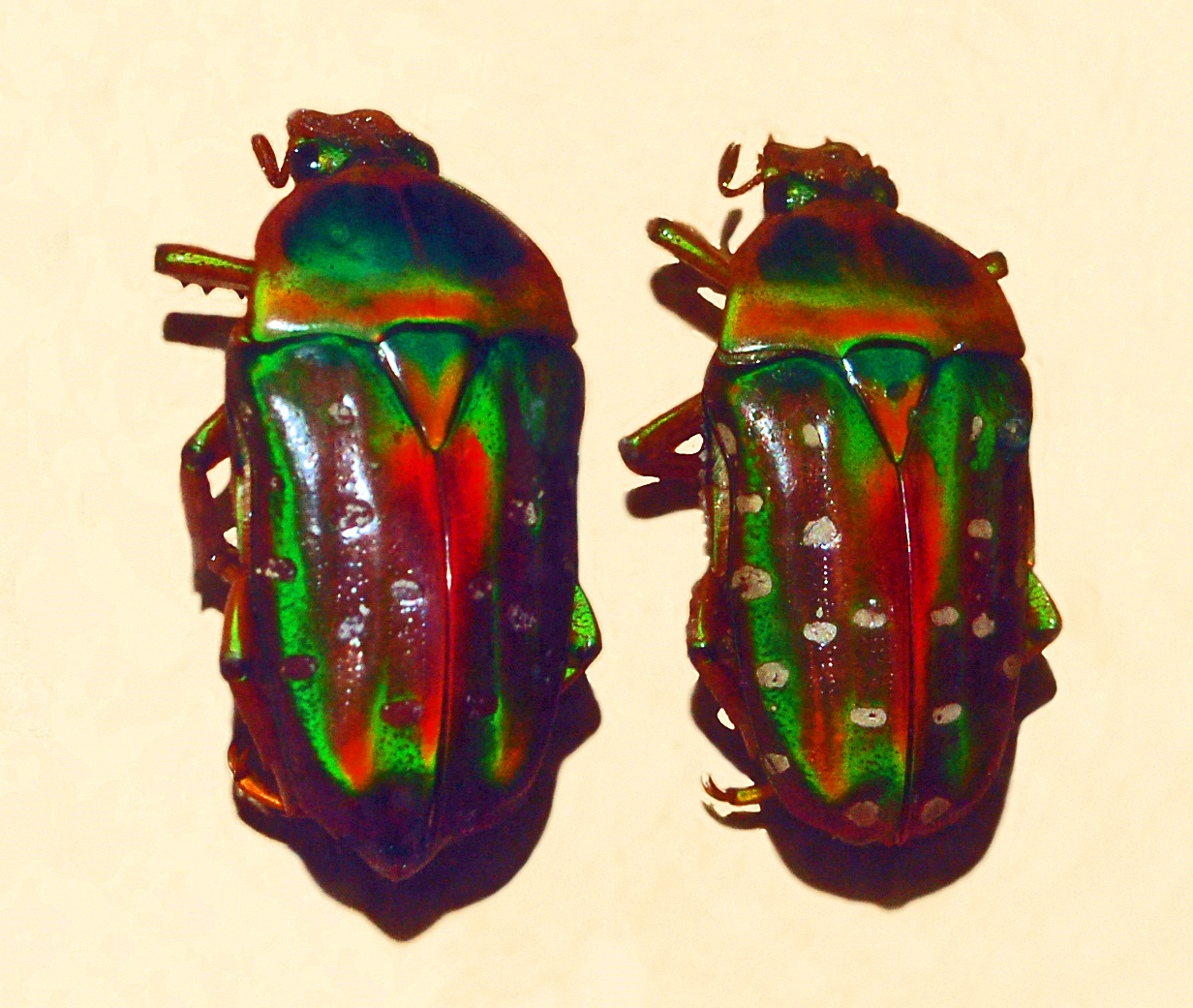
- Stephanorrhina julia from Cameroon

Scientific classification
- Kingdom: Animalia
- Phylum: Arthropoda
- Class: Insecta
- Order: Coleoptera
- Suborder: Polyphaga
- Infraorder: Scarabaeiformia
- Family: Scarabaeidae
- Genus: Stephanorrhina
- Species: S. julia

Binomial name
- Stephanorrhina julia (Waterhouse, 1879)

Synonyms
- Aphelorrhina julia Waterhouse, 1879

= Stephanorrhina julia =

Species of beetle

Stephanorrhina julia is a species of beetles of the family Scarabaeidae, subfamily Cetoniinae and tribe Goliathini.

== Description ==
Stephanorrhina julia can reach about 25–30 millimetres (0.98–1.18 in) in length. It has a brilliant metallic green and red coloration, with whitish spots on the elytra.

== Distribution ==
This species occurs in Cameroon.
