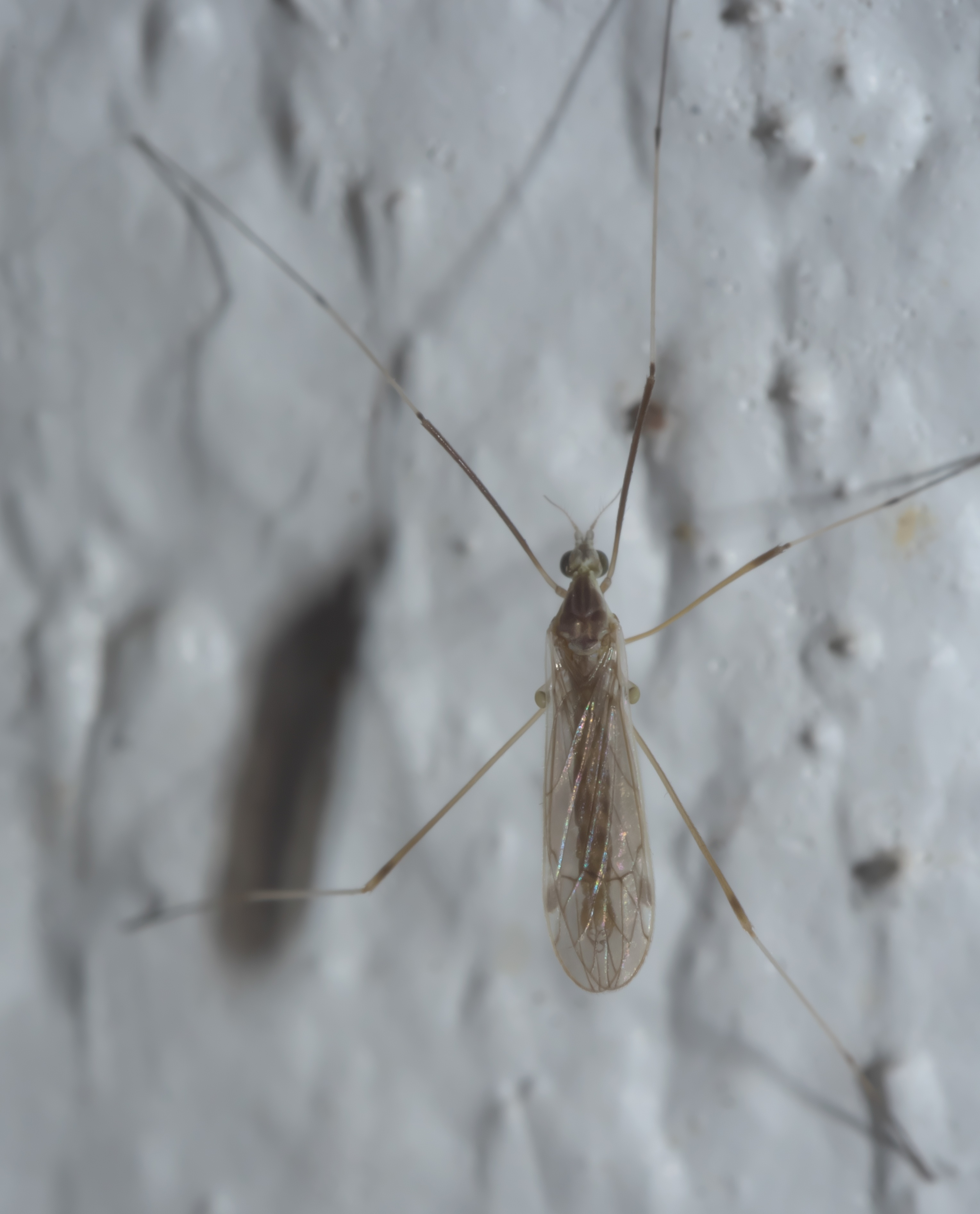

Scientific classification
- Kingdom: Animalia
- Phylum: Arthropoda
- Class: Insecta
- Order: Diptera
- Family: Limoniidae
- Subfamily: Chioneinae
- Tribe: Eriopterini
- Genus: Molophilus; Curtis, 1833

Type species
- Molophilus brevipennis Curtis, 1833 (= ater Meigen, 1804)

Subgenera
- Austromolophilus Theischinger, 1988; Bistromolophilus Theischinger, 1999; Diplomolophilus Theischinger, 1992; Eumolophilus Alexander, 1921; Lyriomolophilus Theischinger, 1988; Molophilus Curtis, 1833; Onychomolophilus Theischinger, 1992; Promolophilus Alexander, 1966; Rhynchomolophilus Alexander, 1965; Superbomolophilus Theischinger, 1988; Trichomolophilus Alexander, 1936

Synonyms
- Archimolophilus Enderlein, 1938

= Molophilus =

Genus of flies

Molophilus is a very large genus of crane flies in the family Limoniidae. It was first described by John Curtis in 1833.

== Species ==
- Subgenus Austromolophilus Theischinger, 1988

- M. acutistylus Alexander, 1929
- M. aplectus Alexander, 1929
- M. asthenes Theischinger, 1992
- M. benesignatus Theischinger, 1988
- M. binyana Theischinger, 1992
- M. burraganee Theischinger, 1992
- M. cassisi Theischinger, 1988
- M. chrysopterus Alexander, 1930
- M. commoni Theischinger, 1988
- M. coraperena Theischinger, 1992
- M. cranstoni Theischinger, 1992
- M. declinatus Theischinger, 1999
- M. denise Theischinger, 1988
- M. dindi Theischinger, 1992
- M. diversistylus Alexander, 1927
- M. echidna Theischinger, 1992
- M. eugonius Alexander, 1927
- M. expansistylus Alexander, 1929
- M. exquisitus Alexander, 1929
- M. flexilis Alexander, 1927
- M. fragillimus Theischinger, 1988
- M. gracillimus Alexander, 1927
- M. gurara Theischinger, 2000
- M. gweeon Theischinger, 1992
- M. heroni Alexander, 1929
- M. illperippa Theischinger, 1992
- M. incomptus Alexander, 1927
- M. kirra Theischinger, 1992
- M. kitchingi Theischinger, 1994
- M. koorang Theischinger, 1992
- M. kulai Theischinger, 1994
- M. laoonana Theischinger, 1994
- M. lea Theischinger, 1992
- M. lewisianus Theischinger, 1996
- M. loratus Alexander, 1929
- M. mattfulleri Theischinger, 1992
- M. mina Theischinger, 2000
- M. ngernka Theischinger, 1994
- M. nglaiye Theischinger, 1994
- M. nini Theischinger, 2000
- M. nurawordubununa Theischinger, 1992
- M. palpera Theischinger, 1992
- M. pervagatus Skuse, 1890
- M. phyllis Alexander, 1930
- M. picticeps Alexander, 1927
- M. pictipes Alexander, 1927
- M. pinta Theischinger, 1992
- M. pulchripes Skuse, 1890
- M. pusio Alexander, 1927
- M. setuliferus Alexander, 1927
- M. smithersi Theischinger, 2000
- M. spetai Theischinger, 1994
- M. subasper Alexander, 1931
- M. subhastatus Alexander, 1931
- M. tenuior Theischinger, 1992
- M. tersus Alexander, 1931
- M. trianguliferus Alexander, 1927
- M. tugloensis Theischinger, 2000
- M. uncinatus Theischinger, 1988
- M. uptoni Theischinger, 1988
- M. warriuka Theischinger, 1992
- M. werrikimbe Theischinger, 2000
- M. wieseri Theischinger, 1994
- M. wilto Theischinger, 2000
- M. yandala Theischinger, 1992

- Subgenus Bistromolophilus Theischinger, 1999

- M. dooraganensis Theischinger, 1999

- Subgenus Diplomolophilus Theischinger, 1992

- M. mongana Theischinger, 1992
- M. yumbera Theischinger, 1992

- Subgenus Eumolophilus Alexander, 1921

- M. angustior Alexander, 1936
- M. pennipes Alexander, 1921
- M. sabethoides Edwards, 1927
- M. thaumastopodus Alexander, 1913

- Subgenus Lyriomolophilus Theischinger, 1988

- M. alexanderorum Theischinger, 1992
- M. barina Theischinger, 1988
- M. bickeli Theischinger, 1992
- M. buckenbowra Theischinger, 1988
- M. collessi Theischinger, 1988
- M. gingera Theischinger, 1988
- M. keira Theischinger, 1988
- M. leonardi Theischinger, 1992
- M. lyratus Alexander, 1927
- M. neboissi Theischinger, 1988
- M. neolyratus Alexander, 1934
- M. sublyratus Alexander, 1931
- M. weringerong Theischinger, 1992

- Subgenus Molophilus Curtis, 1833

- M. abhorrens Theischinger, 1999
- M. abitus Alexander, 1944
- M. abortivus Alexander, 1927
- M. abruptus Alexander, 1923
- M. acanthostylus Alexander, 1969
- M. acanthus Alexander, 1923
- M. aciferus Alexander, 1927
- M. acinacis Alexander, 1969
- M. acis Alexander, 1969
- M. aculobatus Alexander, 1969
- M. acutissimus Theischinger, 1988
- M. adamantinus Alexander, 1927
- M. aditi Alexander, 1969
- M. admetus Alexander, 1969
- M. aduncus Stary, 1978
- M. aenigmaticus Alexander, 1925
- M. aequiramus Savchenko, 1982
- M. aequistylus Alexander, 1927
- M. affrictus Alexander, 1950
- M. africanus Riedel, 1914
- M. akama Theischinger, 1992
- M. alatostylus Hynes, 1988
- M. albiceps Edwards, 1926
- M. albireo Alexander, 1932
- M. albocostalis Alexander, 1928
- M. albohalteratus Alexander, 1925
- M. alexanderianus Nielsen, 1963
- M. algol Alexander, 1954
- M. alpicola Alexander, 1930
- M. amiculus Alexander, 1927
- M. amieuensis Hynes, 1993
- M. amphacanthus Alexander, 1952
- M. ampliatus Alexander, 1927
- M. analis Alexander, 1923
- M. anerastus Alexander, 1934
- M. angustilamina Alexander, 1956
- M. annexus Alexander, 1927
- M. annulipes Skuse, 1890
- M. antares Alexander, 1932
- M. anthracinus Lackschewitz, 1940
- M. antimenus Alexander, 1952
- M. aphantus Alexander, 1927
- M. apicidens Alexander, 1951
- M. apicidentatus Alexander, 1955
- M. apicispinulus Alexander, 1969
- M. appendiculatus (Staeger, 1840)
- M. appressospinus Alexander, 1952
- M. appressus Alexander, 1929
- M. apricus Alexander, 1927
- M. arapahoensis Alexander, 1958
- M. araucanus Alexander, 1929
- M. araucoensis Alexander, 1981
- M. arcanus Alexander, 1927
- M. archboldeanus Alexander, 1961
- M. arciferus Alexander, 1952
- M. arcuarius Alexander, 1930
- M. aricola Alexander, 1930
- M. ariel Alexander, 1932
- M. arisanus Alexander, 1923
- M. arizonicus Alexander, 1946
- M. armatissimus Bangerter, 1947
- M. armatistylus Alexander, 1929
- M. ascendens Alexander, 1945
- M. aspersulus Alexander, 1962
- M. assamensis Brunetti, 1912
- M. ater (Meigen, 1804)
- M. aterrimus Alexander, 1936
- M. atnaterta Theischinger, 1992
- M. atrostylus Savchenko, 1978
- M. aucklandicus Alexander, 1923
- M. auriculifer Theischinger, 1988
- M. avidus Alexander, 1940
- M. avitus Alexander, 1953
- M. axillispinus Alexander, 1962
- M. azuayensis Alexander, 1980
- M. babanus Alexander, 1957
- M. baezi Theowald, 1981
- M. banahaoensis Alexander, 1931
- M. banias Stary & Freidberg, 2007
- M. banksianus Alexander, 1922
- M. bardus Alexander, 1934
- M. barretti Alexander, 1929
- M. basispina Alexander, 1923
- M. basispinosus Alexander, 1981
- M. bawbawiensis Alexander, 1931
- M. bellicosus Alexander, 1929
- M. bellona Alexander, 1946
- M. belone Alexander, 1961
- M. berberus Theischinger, 1994
- M. beri Theischinger, 1992
- M. berigora Theischinger, 1994
- M. biaga Theischinger, 1992
- M. bibaculus Alexander, 1979
- M. bicaudatus Alexander, 1929
- M. bicolor de Meijere, 1911
- M. bidens Alexander, 1923
- M. bidigitatus Alexander, 1931
- M. bidigitifer Savchenko, 1976
- M. bierigi Alexander, 1947
- M. bifalcatus Alexander, 1925
- M. bifidus Goetghebuer, 1920
- M. bifilamentosus Alexander, 1948
- M. bihamatus de Meijere, 1918
- M. bilyarra Theischinger, 1992
- M. binarius Alexander, 1968
- M. binnaburra Theischinger, 1988
- M. bipenniger Alexander, 1969
- M. bipugiatus Alexander, 1969
- M. bischofi Lackschewitz, 1940
- M. bispinosus Alexander, 1919
- M. bogongensis Alexander, 1929
- M. boki Alexander, 1974
- M. brachythrix Alexander, 1969
- M. brasseanus Alexander, 1962
- M. brevihamatus Bangerter, 1947
- M. brevilobatus Alexander, 1939
- M. brevinervis Alexander, 1923
- M. breviramus Alexander, 1929
- M. brevisectus Alexander, 1971
- M. brevispinosus Alexander, 1929
- M. brownianus Alexander, 1945
- M. bruchi Alexander, 1923
- M. bubbera Theischinger, 1992
- M. bucerus Alexander, 1927
- M. bunyipensis Alexander, 1931
- M. cadmus Alexander, 1969
- M. caenosus Alexander, 1937
- M. calceatus Alexander, 1929
- M. camerounensis Alexander, 1920
- M. campbellianus Alexander, 1924
- M. canopus Alexander, 1952
- M. capitatus Alexander, 1927
- M. capricornis Alexander, 1916
- M. carpishensis Alexander, 1949
- M. carstensis Stary, 1971
- M. catamarcensis Alexander, 1921
- M. cautus Alexander, 1947
- M. celaenoleucus Alexander, 1961
- M. celebesicus Alexander, 1935
- M. cerberus Alexander, 1927
- M. cervus Alexander, 1929
- M. chazeaui Hynes, 1993
- M. chiriquiensis Alexander, 1934
- M. chleuastes Alexander, 1961
- M. chloris Alexander, 1930
- M. christine Theischinger, 1988
- M. cinereifrons de Meijere, 1920
- M. cingulipes Alexander, 1927
- M. cladocerus Alexander, 1921
- M. claessoni Mendl, 1986
- M. clavigerus Alexander, 1929
- M. clavistylus Mendl, 1979
- M. colobicus Alexander, 1969
- M. colonus Bergroth, 1888
- M. colossus Alexander, 1929
- M. compactus Alexander, 1950
- M. concussus Alexander, 1936
- M. congregatus Alexander, 1931
- M. conscriptus Alexander, 1938
- M. copelatus Alexander, 1969
- M. coramba Theischinger, 1994
- M. corniger de Meijere, 1920
- M. coronarius Alexander, 1952
- M. coryne Alexander, 1976
- M. costalis Edwards, 1916
- M. costopunctatus Dietz, 1921
- M. cramptoni Alexander, 1924
- M. crassipygus de Meijere, 1918
- M. crassistylus Alexander, 1952
- M. crassulus Alexander, 1934
- M. creon Alexander, 1969
- M. crimensis Savchenko, 1976
- M. cristiferus Alexander, 1950
- M. crististylus Alexander, 1969
- M. cruciferus Alexander, 1922
- M. ctenistes Alexander, 1961
- M. ctenophorus Alexander, 1979
- M. curtivena Alexander, 1925
- M. curvatus Tonnoir, 1920
- M. curvistylus Alexander, 1925
- M. cyatheticolus Alexander, 1950
- M. cygnus Alexander, 1932
- M. czizeki Lackschewitz, 1931
- M. daimio Alexander, 1953
- M. dalby Theischinger, 1994
- M. danielsi Theischinger, 1988
- M. debilior Alexander, 1943
- M. debilistylus Alexander, 1937
- M. defoeanus Alexander, 1952
- M. denticulatus Alexander, 1923
- M. diacaenus Alexander, 1976
- M. diacanthus Alexander, 1971
- M. diacanthus Alexander, 1979
- M. diceros Alexander, 1944
- M. dicranostylus Alexander, 1961
- M. dido Alexander, 1943
- M. diferox Alexander, 1958
- M. difficilis Alexander, 1927
- M. dilatibasis Alexander, 1956
- M. dilatus Alexander, 1951
- M. diplolophus Alexander, 1969
- M. directidens Stary, 1976
- M. dirhabdus Alexander, 1949
- M. dirus Alexander, 1943
- M. dischidius Alexander, 1969
- M. distifurcus Alexander, 1952
- M. distinctissimus Alexander, 1931
- M. distiremus Alexander, 1971
- M. diversilobus Alexander, 1960
- M. dizygus Alexander, 1962
- M. dobrotworskyi Theischinger, 1992
- M. dorriganus Alexander, 1934
- M. dorsolobatus Theischinger, 1988
- M. dravidianus Alexander, 1969
- M. drepanostylus Alexander, 1934
- M. drepanucha Alexander, 1929
- M. duckhousei Theischinger, 1992
- M. ductilis Alexander, 1938
- M. duplex Alexander, 1927
- M. duplicatus Alexander, 1940
- M. eboracensis Alexander, 1944
- M. echo Alexander, 1952
- M. editus Alexander, 1928
- M. efferox Alexander, 1947
- M. electus Alexander, 1927
- M. emarginatus Alexander, 1937
- M. ephippiger Alexander, 1934
- M. erebus Alexander, 1927
- M. erectus Alexander, 1953
- M. ermolenkoi Savchenko, 1976
- M. errabunga Theischinger, 1992
- M. erricha Theischinger, 1992
- M. errinundra Theischinger, 1999
- M. erugatus Alexander, 1960
- M. ethicus Alexander, 1962
- M. eumonostylus Alexander, 1952
- M. eurygramma Alexander, 1929
- M. exeches Alexander, 1965
- M. exemptus Alexander, 1953
- M. exiguus Alexander, 1927
- M. expansus Alexander, 1927
- M. exsertus Alexander, 1927
- M. extensicornis Alexander, 1934
- M. extensilobus Alexander, 1960
- M. extricatus Alexander, 1930
- M. facinus Alexander, 1940
- M. fagetorum Alexander, 1929
- M. falcatus Bergroth, 1888
- M. falculus Alexander, 1957
- M. falx Alexander, 1938
- M. femoratus Skuse, 1890
- M. fenderi Alexander, 1952
- M. fergusonianus Alexander, 1927
- M. ferox Alexander, 1931
- M. filiolus Alexander, 1952
- M. filistylus Alexander, 1927
- M. filius Alexander, 1952
- M. flagellatus Stary, 1976
- M. flagellifer Alexander, 1922
- M. flavexemptus Alexander, 1968
- M. flavidellus Alexander, 1930
- M. flavidulus Alexander, 1923
- M. flavidus Alexander, 1914
- M. flavoannulatus Alexander, 1927
- M. flavocingulatus Alexander, 1928
- M. flavomarginalis Alexander, 1923
- M. flavonotatus Skuse, 1890
- M. flavotibialis Alexander, 1969
- M. flavus Goetghebuer, 1920
- M. flemingi Alexander, 1950
- M. flexilistylus Alexander, 1931
- M. flexostylus Hynes, 1988
- M. flinti Alexander, 1967
- M. floridensis Alexander, 1925
- M. fluviatilis Bangerter, 1947
- M. forceps Alexander, 1927
- M. forcipulus (Osten Sacken, 1869)
- M. fortidens Alexander, 1951
- M. franzi Caspers, 1980
- M. frohnei Alexander, 1968
- M. fultonensis Alexander, 1916
- M. furciferus Alexander, 1965
- M. furcophallus Hynes, 1988
- M. furcus Alexander, 1951
- M. furiosus Alexander, 1938
- M. furvus Alexander, 1927
- M. fuscopleuralis Alexander, 1927
- M. fusiformis Alexander, 1934
- M. fustiferus Alexander, 1961
- M. gargantua Alexander, 1941
- M. gemellus Alexander, 1927
- M. genitalis (Brunetti, 1912)
- M. gilvus Alexander, 1927
- M. gladiator Alexander, 1939
- M. gomesi Alexander, 1942
- M. gracilipes Alexander, 1959
- M. gracilis Skuse, 1890
- M. grampianus Alexander, 1930
- M. gravis Alexander, 1956
- M. gressittianus Alexander, 1961
- M. griseatus Edwards, 1933
- M. griseus (Meigen, 1804)
- M. grus Alexander, 1941
- M. guatemalensis Alexander, 1913
- M. gubara Theischinger, 1994
- M. gununo Theischinger, 1992
- M. gurkha Alexander, 1959
- M. gymnocladus Alexander, 1928
- M. haagi Alexander, 1946
- M. habbemae Alexander, 1961
- M. hardyi Alexander, 1973
- M. harrisianus Alexander, 1925
- M. harrisoni Alexander, 1945
- M. hecate Alexander, 1971
- M. heliscus Alexander, 1969
- M. heteracanthus Alexander, 1925
- M. heterocerus Dietz, 1921
- M. hexacanthus Alexander, 1924
- M. hilaris Alexander, 1923
- M. hirsuticlavus Alexander, 1980
- M. hirtipennis (Osten Sacken, 1860)
- M. hispidulus Alexander, 1932
- M. hollowayi Theischinger, 1988
- M. honestus Alexander, 1923
- M. hoplostylus Alexander, 1950
- M. horakae Theischinger, 1994
- M. horridus Alexander, 1927
- M. howensis Theischinger, 1994
- M. howesi Alexander, 1923
- M. huron Alexander, 1929
- M. hylandensis Theischinger, 1999
- M. hyperarmatus Alexander, 1940
- M. hypipame Theischinger, 1996
- M. hyrcanus Savchenko, 1978
- M. hystrix Alexander, 1939
- M. ictus Alexander, 1969
- M. idiophallus Alexander, 1956
- M. idiostylus Alexander, 1969
- M. illectus Alexander, 1941
- M. iluka Theischinger, 1992
- M. imberbis Alexander, 1923
- M. immutatus Alexander, 1929
- M. improcerus Alexander, 1939
- M. inaequidens Alexander, 1927
- M. inarmatus Alexander, 1940
- M. incognitus Alexander, 1946
- M. inconspicuus Brunetti, 1912
- M. incurvus Mendl, 1979
- M. indivisus Alexander, 1927
- M. indurabilis Alexander, 1967
- M. infantulus Edwards, 1923
- M. inflexibilis Alexander, 1929
- M. inimicus Alexander, 1935
- M. injustus Alexander, 1937
- M. inornatus Edwards, 1923
- M. insanus Alexander, 1970
- M. insertus Theischinger, 1992
- M. intactus Alexander, 1961
- M. integristylus Alexander, 1945
- M. inusitatus Alexander, 1979
- M. invidus Alexander, 1951
- M. irregularis Alexander, 1923
- M. ishizuchianus Alexander, 1954
- M. isolatus Alexander, 1952
- M. issikii Alexander, 1928
- M. itoanus Alexander, 1953
- M. ixine Alexander, 1961
- M. iyoanus Alexander, 1953
- M. iyouta Theischinger, 1994
- M. janus Alexander, 1930
- M. japetus Alexander, 1969
- M. javensis Edwards, 1927
- M. jenseni Alexander, 1924
- M. kaandha Theischinger, 1992
- M. kallemuelleri Mendl, 1984
- M. kama Theischinger, 1992
- M. karaka Theischinger, 1992
- M. karta Theischinger, 1992
- M. keda Theischinger, 1992
- M. khasicus Alexander, 1936
- M. kinabaluanus Edwards, 1933
- M. kiushiuensis Alexander, 1941
- M. klementi Mendl, 1973
- M. kokodanus Alexander, 1948
- M. kokora Theischinger, 1992
- M. kotenkoi Savchenko, 1986
- M. kuborensis Hynes, 1988
- M. kulshanicus Alexander, 1949
- M. kuniekoondie Theischinger, 1992
- M. kutha Theischinger, 1992
- M. lackschewitzianus Alexander, 1953
- M. laevistylus Alexander, 1944
- M. laius Alexander, 1969
- M. lanceolatus Stary, 1971
- M. lancifer Alexander, 1953
- M. lanei Alexander, 1945
- M. laricicola Alexander, 1929
- M. laterospinosus Alexander, 1929
- M. latibasis Alexander, 1956
- M. latipennis Alexander, 1923
- M. lauri Alexander, 1945
- M. lautereri Stary, 1974
- M. laxus Alexander, 1950
- M. leonurus Alexander, 1951
- M. lepcha Alexander, 1959
- M. lerionis Alexander, 1945
- M. lethaeus Alexander, 1952
- M. lewis Theischinger, 1994
- M. lictor Alexander, 1938
- M. lieftincki Alexander, 1961
- M. lindsayi lindsayi Alexander, 1922
- M. lindsayi oliveri Alexander, 1922
- M. lobiferus Alexander, 1925
- M. longiclavus Alexander, 1924
- M. longicornis Skuse, 1890
- M. longifurcatus Theischinger, 1988
- M. longioricornis Alexander, 1921
- M. longistylus Savchenko, 1976
- M. lucidipennis Skuse, 1890
- M. lupus Alexander, 1954
- M. luteipennis Alexander, 1923
- M. luteipygus Alexander, 1922
- M. luxuriosus Alexander, 1938
- M. macalpinei Theischinger, 1988
- M. mackerrasi Alexander, 1927
- M. macleayanus Alexander, 1928
- M. macquillani Theischinger, 1994
- M. macracanthus Savchenko, 1983
- M. macrocerus Alexander, 1922
- M. macrophallus Alexander, 1925
- M. macrothrix Alexander, 1969
- M. magellanicus Alexander, 1968
- M. maigamaigawa Theischinger, 1992
- M. malayensis Edwards, 1928
- M. mancus Alexander, 1944
- M. manjimupensis Theischinger, 1988
- M. margarita Alexander, 1979
- M. maroondah Theischinger, 1992
- M. marthae Alexander, 1931
- M. masafuerae Alexander, 1952
- M. mattina Theischinger, 1992
- M. maurus Lackschewitz, 1925
- M. mawiliri Theischinger, 1992
- M. medius de Meijere, 1918
- M. megacanthus Alexander, 1934
- M. melanakon Alexander, 1969
- M. melanoleucus Alexander, 1953
- M. memnon Alexander, 1971
- M. mendicus Alexander, 1931
- M. metpadinga Theischinger, 1992
- M. metuendus Alexander, 1951
- M. micracanthus Alexander, 1927
- M. microserratus Alexander, 1980
- M. militaris Alexander, 1931
- M. mimicus Alexander, 1929
- M. ministylus Theischinger, 1999
- M. miraculus Alexander, 1938
- M. mirla Theischinger, 1992
- M. mjobergi Alexander, 1927
- M. momus Alexander, 1969
- M. monacanthus Alexander, 1940
- M. monoctenus Alexander, 1951
- M. monostyloides Alexander, 1951
- M. monostylus Alexander, 1928
- M. monstrosus Mendl, 1974
- M. montanus Mendl, 1973
- M. monteithi Theischinger, 1994
- M. morosus Alexander, 1923
- M. morulus Alexander, 1929
- M. mouensis Hynes, 1993
- M. mouldsi Theischinger, 1988
- M. muggil Theischinger, 1994
- M. multicinctus Edwards, 1923
- M. multicurvatus Theischinger, 1988
- M. multifidus Alexander, 1952
- M. multilobatus Savchenko, 1976
- M. multispicatus Alexander, 1978
- M. multispinosus Alexander, 1923
- M. murudanus Edwards, 1926
- M. myersi Alexander, 1925
- M. nahuelbutae Alexander, 1967
- M. nakamurai Alexander, 1933
- M. nannopterus Alexander, 1956
- M. natalicolus Alexander, 1958
- M. neanerastus Alexander, 1969
- M. neecoo Theischinger, 1994
- M. neodiceros Alexander, 1967
- M. neofacinus Alexander, 1964
- M. neopansus Alexander, 1971
- M. neosubfalcatus Alexander, 1980
- M. neovaruna Alexander, 1973
- M. neptunus Alexander, 1952
- M. nerriga Theischinger, 1992
- M. nesioticus Alexander, 1953
- M. nielseni Theischinger, 1994
- M. niger Goetghebuer, 1920
- M. nigrescens Lackschewitz, 1940
- M. nigripes Edwards, 1921
- M. nigritarsis Alexander, 1930
- M. nigritus Alexander, 1930
- M. nilgiricus Edwards, 1927
- M. niveicinctus Alexander, 1922
- M. nocticolor Alexander, 1953
- M. nodicornis Lackschewitz, 1935
- M. nodulifer Savchenko, 1978
- M. nokonis Alexander, 1928
- M. norrisi Theischinger, 1994
- M. novacaesariensis Alexander, 1916
- M. nubleanus Alexander, 1979
- M. obediens Alexander, 1927
- M. obliteratus Alexander, 1931
- M. obliviosus Alexander, 1953
- M. obscurus (Meigen, 1818)
- M. obsoletus Lackschewitz, 1940
- M. obtusilobus Alexander, 1969
- M. occidentalis Theischinger, 1988
- M. occultus de Meijere, 1918
- M. ochraceus (Meigen, 1818)
- M. ohakunensis Alexander, 1923
- M. okadai Alexander, 1936
- M. oldenbergi Lackschewitz, 1935
- M. oligacanthus Alexander, 1958
- M. oligotrichus Alexander, 1954
- M. oppositus Alexander, 1923
- M. opulus Alexander, 1929
- M. orcus Alexander, 1970
- M. ordinarius Alexander, 1948
- M. oregonicolus Alexander, 1947
- M. orion Alexander, 1914
- M. ornatipes Alexander, 1969
- M. ornithostylus Alexander, 1981
- M. orumbera Theischinger, 1994
- M. othello Alexander, 1941
- M. ozotus Alexander, 1968
- M. pacifer Alexander, 1947
- M. padmuri Theischinger, 1992
- M. paganus Alexander, 1942
- M. pala Alexander, 1941
- M. pallatangensis Alexander, 1929
- M. pallidibasis Alexander, 1928
- M. pallidipes Alexander, 1975
- M. pallidulus Alexander, 1925
- M. pallidus (Philippi, 1866)
- M. palomaricus Alexander, 1947
- M. palpifer Savchenko, 1976
- M. paludicola Alexander, 1929
- M. panchrestus Alexander, 1941
- M. pansus Alexander, 1968
- M. paradiceros Alexander, 1967
- M. paraguayanus Alexander, 1929
- M. parannulipes Theischinger, 1992
- M. paratetrodonta Theischinger, 1992
- M. parerebus Theischinger, 1992
- M. parvati Alexander, 1969
- M. parviclavus Alexander, 1979
- M. parviserratus Alexander, 1934
- M. parvispiculus Alexander, 1976
- M. parvistylus Alexander, 1927
- M. parvulus Alexander, 1922
- M. pastoris Alexander, 1960
- M. paucispinosus Alexander, 1925
- M. paucispinus Alexander, 1957
- M. paulus Bergroth, 1888
- M. pauper Savchenko, 1978
- M. pauperculus Alexander, 1929
- M. pectinatus Alexander, 1928
- M. pectiniferus Alexander, 1952
- M. peculiaris Alexander, 1973
- M. pediformis Alexander, 1925
- M. pegasus Alexander, 1913
- M. penai Alexander, 1951
- M. pengana Theischinger, 1992
- M. penicillatus Alexander, 1941
- M. pennatus Alexander, 1927
- M. perattenuatus Alexander, 1969
- M. perdebilis Alexander, 1943
- M. perdistinctus Alexander, 1927
- M. perextensus Alexander, 1951
- M. perferox Alexander, 1957
- M. perfidus Alexander, 1929
- M. perflaveolus Alexander, 1918
- M. pergracillimus Alexander, 1971
- M. perhirtipes Alexander, 1961
- M. perlucidus Alexander, 1950
- M. perluteolus Alexander, 1930
- M. permutatus Alexander, 1931
- M. perpendicularis Alexander, 1944
- M. perproductus Alexander, 1948
- M. perserenus Alexander, 1978
- M. perseus Alexander, 1913
- M. persimilis Alexander, 1927
- M. persinuosus Alexander, 1941
- M. pertenuis Alexander, 1953
- M. phallacanthus Alexander, 1950
- M. phallodontus Alexander, 1968
- M. phallosomicus Alexander, 1939
- M. philpotti Alexander, 1922
- M. pictifemoratus Alexander, 1933
- M. pictipleura Alexander, 1922
- M. pictitibia Alexander, 1969
- M. pictor Alexander, 1934
- M. picturatus Alexander, 1923
- M. pieltaini Edwards, 1938
- M. piger Alexander, 1942
- M. pilosulus Edwards, 1924
- M. pimelia Theischinger, 1988
- M. pirioni Alexander, 1929
- M. pita Theischinger, 1992
- M. plagiatus Alexander, 1922
- M. planitas Alexander, 1953
- M. platyphallus Alexander, 1942
- M. plebejus Alexander, 1956
- M. pleuralis de Meijere, 1920
- M. pleurolineatus Stary, 1971
- M. plumbeiceps Alexander, 1927
- M. poecilonotus Alexander, 1924
- M. poliocephalus Alexander, 1927
- M. politonigrus Savchenko, 1983
- M. pollex Alexander, 1931
- M. polycanthus Alexander, 1936
- M. polychaeta Alexander, 1979
- M. ponticus Savchenko, 1982
- M. porrectus Alexander, 1925
- M. praelatus Alexander, 1927
- M. pretiosus Alexander, 1929
- M. priapoides Stary, 1971
- M. priapus Lackschewitz, 1935
- M. procax Alexander, 1946
- M. procericornis Alexander, 1931
- M. profligatus Alexander, 1961
- M. prolatus Alexander, 1961
- M. promeces Alexander, 1961
- M. propinquus (Egger, 1863)
- M. protervus Alexander, 1961
- M. proximus Mendl, 1979
- M. psephenus Alexander, 1978
- M. pseudopropinquus Mendl, 1973
- M. pubipennis (Osten Sacken, 1860)
- M. pugiunculus Alexander, 1969
- M. pugnax Alexander, 1925
- M. pulcherrimus Edwards, 1923
- M. pullatus Alexander, 1924
- M. pullus Lackschewitz, 1927
- M. pulvinus Alexander, 1943
- M. pusillus Edwards, 1921
- M. pustulatus Alexander, 1946
- M. puthawing Theischinger, 1994
- M. quadrifidus Alexander, 1922
- M. quadrispinosus Alexander, 1924
- M. quadristylus Alexander, 1922
- M. quinquespinosus Alexander, 1952
- M. rachius Alexander, 1958
- M. rainieriensis Alexander, 1943
- M. raptor Alexander, 1947
- M. rasilis Alexander, 1927
- M. recisus Alexander, 1924
- M. rectispinus Alexander, 1952
- M. reductissimus Alexander, 1956
- M. reductus Alexander, 1927
- M. reduncus Alexander, 1925
- M. remiger Alexander, 1922
- M. remotus Alexander, 1923
- M. remulsus Alexander, 1932
- M. repandus Alexander, 1923
- M. repentinus Stary, 1971
- M. retrorsus Alexander, 1939
- M. rhamphus Alexander, 1979
- M. riawunna Theischinger, 1992
- M. richardsi Alexander, 1929
- M. rostriferus Alexander, 1943
- M. rubidithorax Alexander, 1929
- M. ruficollis Skuse, 1890
- M. sackenianus Alexander, 1926
- M. sagax Alexander, 1938
- M. sagittarius Alexander, 1914
- M. sarotes Alexander, 1969
- M. satyr Alexander, 1925
- M. savtshenkoi Stary, 1972
- M. scaber Alexander, 1927
- M. scabricornis Alexander, 1942
- M. schultzei Alexander, 1946
- M. scotoneurus Alexander, 1960
- M. scutellatus Goetghebuer, 1929
- M. secundus Alexander, 1923
- M. selkirkianus (Enderlein, 1938)
- M. sepositus Alexander, 1923
- M. sequoiae Alexander, 1952
- M. sericatus Alexander, 1924
- M. serpentarius Alexander, 1962
- M. serpentiger Edwards, 1938
- M. serratus Savchenko, 1976
- M. serrulatus Alexander, 1929
- M. setilobatus Alexander, 1979
- M. setistylatus Alexander, 1980
- M. setosistylus Alexander, 1952
- M. severus Alexander, 1925
- M. shannoninus Alexander, 1947
- M. sherpa Alexander, 1959
- M. sicarius Alexander, 1929
- M. sigma Alexander, 1927
- M. sinclairi Theischinger, 1996
- M. soror Alexander, 1927
- M. sparsispinus Alexander, 1952
- M. sparus Alexander, 1940
- M. speighti Alexander, 1939
- M. spiculatus Alexander, 1918
- M. spiculistylatus Alexander, 1930
- M. spiniapicalis Alexander, 1976
- M. spinifer Lackschewitz, 1940
- M. spinifex Alexander, 1952
- M. spinilobatus Alexander, 1969
- M. spinosissimus Alexander, 1956
- M. spinulosus Alexander, 1979
- M. sponsus Alexander, 1955
- M. squamosus Alexander, 1919
- M. stenacanthus Alexander, 1962
- M. stenopterus Alexander, 1936
- M. stenorhabdus Alexander, 1960
- M. stewartensis Alexander, 1924
- M. stolidus Alexander, 1948
- M. strix Alexander, 1930
- M. stroblianus Nielsen, 1953
- M. stygius Alexander, 1980
- M. stylifer Alexander, 1921
- M. stylopappus Alexander, 1961
- M. styx Alexander, 1952
- M. suavis Alexander, 1927
- M. subalpicola Alexander, 1931
- M. subannulipes Alexander, 1978
- M. subappressus Alexander, 1940
- M. subbelone Hynes, 1988
- M. subexemptus Alexander, 1968
- M. subfalcatus Alexander, 1940
- M. subgriseus Savchenko, 1976
- M. subhonestus Alexander, 1971
- M. subhorridus Alexander, 1931
- M. subiratus Alexander, 1947
- M. sublancifer Alexander, 1973
- M. sublateralis Alexander, 1922
- M. sublictor Alexander, 1939
- M. submorosus Alexander, 1924
- M. subochraceus Savchenko, 1976
- M. subperfidus Alexander, 1980
- M. subretrorsus Alexander, 1980
- M. subsagax Alexander, 1939
- M. subscaber Alexander, 1952
- M. substylifer Alexander, 1929
- M. subtenebricosus Alexander, 1931
- M. subuliferus Alexander, 1925
- M. subvinnulus Alexander, 1973
- M. suffalcatus Alexander, 1947
- M. sylvicolus Alexander, 1924
- M. takaoensis Alexander, 1933
- M. talamancensis Alexander, 1947
- M. tantulus Alexander, 1969
- M. tanypodus Alexander, 1969
- M. tanypus Alexander, 1922
- M. tartarus Alexander, 1948
- M. tasioceroides Alexander, 1930
- M. tateanus Alexander, 1962
- M. taurus Alexander, 1914
- M. tawagensis Alexander, 1931
- M. taylorinus Alexander, 1936
- M. tehuelche Alexander, 1968
- M. telerhabdus Alexander, 1946
- M. tenebricosus Alexander, 1916
- M. tenuiclavus Alexander, 1927
- M. tenuissimus Alexander, 1923
- M. tenuistylus Alexander, 1923
- M. tergospinosus Alexander, 1967
- M. terminans Alexander, 1922
- M. ternarius Alexander, 1929
- M. ternatus Alexander, 1934
- M. terrayi Stary, 1992
- M. tetracanthus Alexander, 1929
- M. tetragonus Alexander, 1934
- M. tetrodonta Alexander, 1942
- M. theresia Theischinger, 1994
- M. thuckara Theischinger, 1994
- M. thyellus Alexander, 1960
- M. tillyardi Alexander, 1922
- M. tirolensis Hancock, 2005
- M. titan Alexander, 1928
- M. titanius Alexander, 1930
- M. tjederi Stary, 1968
- M. tonnoiri Alexander, 1925
- M. tortilis Alexander, 1927
- M. toxopeanus Alexander, 1961
- M. translucens Skuse, 1890
- M. tricuspidatus Mendl, 1979
- M. tridens Alexander, 1952
- M. tridigitatus Alexander, 1947
- M. triepiurus Alexander, 1961
- M. trifibra Alexander, 1954
- M. trifilatus Alexander, 1920
- M. trigonalis Alexander, 1931
- M. triparcus Alexander, 1944
- M. tripectinatus Alexander, 1927
- M. trispinosus Theischinger, 1992
- M. tristylus Alexander, 1927
- M. tseni Alexander, 1940
- M. tucumanus Alexander, 1929
- M. turritus Alexander, 1961
- M. tuta Theischinger, 1992
- M. tuu Theischinger, 1992
- M. ugundyi Theischinger, 1994
- M. ulbracullima Theischinger, 1992
- M. umboiensis Hynes, 1988
- M. undulatus Tonnoir, 1920
- M. uniclavatus Alexander, 1938
- M. uniformis (Blanchard, 1852)
- M. uniguttatus Alexander, 1927
- M. uniplagiatus Alexander, 1923
- M. unispiculatus Alexander, 1959
- M. unispinosus Alexander, 1921
- M. unistylus Alexander, 1936
- M. upjohni Theischinger, 1994
- M. urodontus Savchenko, 1978
- M. ursus Alexander, 1918
- M. vafer Lackschewitz, 1940
- M. vallisspei Theischinger, 1988
- M. variatus Alexander, 1952
- M. variegatus Edwards, 1923
- M. variispinus Stary, 1971
- M. variistylus Alexander, 1927
- M. variitibia Alexander, 1956
- M. varuna Alexander, 1969
- M. veddah Alexander, 1958
- M. velvetus Alexander, 1926
- M. verecundus Alexander, 1924
- M. vernalis Brunhes & Geiger, 1992
- M. verticalis Alexander, 1927
- M. vigilans Alexander, 1956
- M. vinnulus Alexander, 1962
- M. vividus Alexander, 1931
- M. vorax Alexander, 1948
- M. vulpinus Alexander, 1929
- M. wadna Theischinger, 1992
- M. walkeri Alexander, 1931
- M. walpole Theischinger, 1988
- M. warroo Theischinger, 1992
- M. wataganensis Theischinger, 1999
- M. waukatte Theischinger, 1992
- M. wejaya Alexander, 1958
- M. wellsae Theischinger, 1999
- M. willara Theischinger, 1992
- M. williamsi Theischinger, 1992
- M. wilsoni Alexander, 1929
- M. womba Theischinger, 1992
- M. worraworra Theischinger, 1992
- M. xanthus Alexander, 1955
- M. yabbie Theischinger, 1992
- M. yakkho Alexander, 1958
- M. yoshimotoi Hynes, 1993
- M. yunquensis Alexander, 1952
- M. zenta Theischinger, 1988
- M. zwickorum Theischinger, 1994

- Subgenus Onychomolophilus Theischinger, 1992

- M. equisetosus Alexander, 1934
- M. gidya Theischinger, 1992
- M. piggibilla Theischinger, 1992

- Subgenus Promolophilus Alexander, 1966

- M. afghanicus Alexander, 1969
- M. albibasis Alexander, 1924
- M. apollyon Alexander, 1955
- M. avazhon Savchenko, 1976
- M. avernus Alexander, 1969
- M. bilobulus Alexander, 1938
- M. brobdingnagius Alexander, 1969
- M. diacus Alexander, 1969
- M. dirhaphis Alexander, 1958
- M. grishma Alexander, 1969
- M. lethe Alexander, 1969
- M. millardi Alexander, 1945
- M. munkar Alexander, 1969
- M. nestor Alexander, 1969
- M. nigropolitus Alexander, 1935
- M. nitidulus Alexander, 1946
- M. nitidus Coquillett, 1905
- M. subnitens Alexander, 1946
- M. sudra Alexander, 1969

- Subgenus Rhynchomolophilus Alexander, 1965

- M. perrostratus Alexander, 1965

- Subgenus Superbomolophilus Theischinger, 1988

- M. brumby Theischinger, 1988
- M. cooloola Theischinger, 1992
- M. froggatti Skuse, 1890
- M. gigas Alexander, 1922
- M. inelegans Alexander, 1927
- M. kunara Theischinger, 1992
- M. marriwirra Theischinger, 1992
- M. osterhas Theischinger, 1994
- M. undia Theischinger, 1996

- Subgenus Trichomolophilus Alexander, 1936

- M. celator Alexander, 1942
- M. multisetosus Alexander, 1936
- M. tentator Alexander, 1947

Unplaced

- M. micropteryx Alexander, 1927
- M. subapterogyne Alexander, 1927
