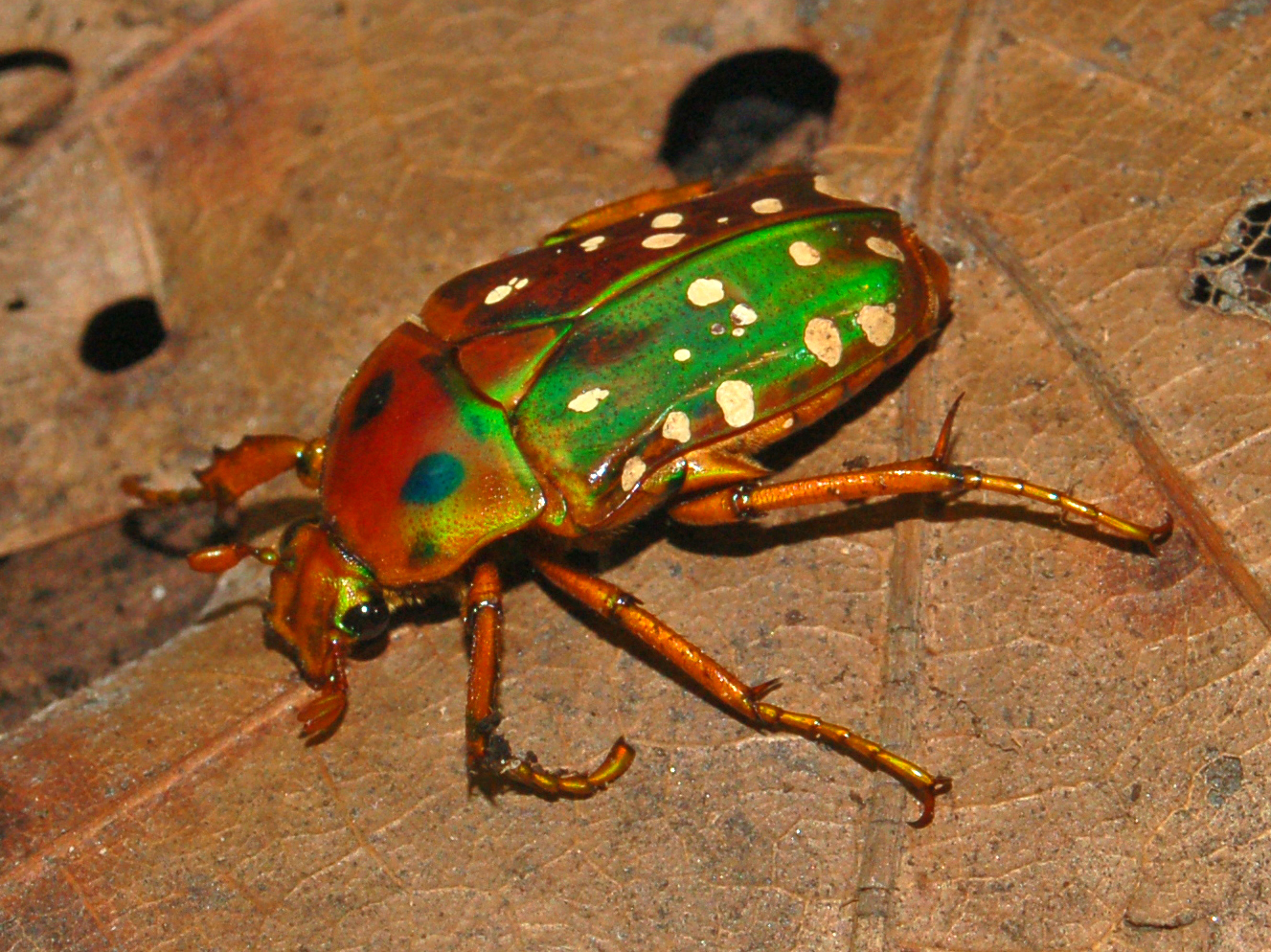
- Stephanorrhina princeps bamptoni at Montreal Insectarium

Scientific classification
- Kingdom: Animalia
- Phylum: Arthropoda
- Clade: Pancrustacea
- Class: Insecta
- Order: Coleoptera
- Suborder: Polyphaga
- Infraorder: Scarabaeiformia
- Family: Scarabaeidae
- Genus: Stephanorrhina
- Species: S. princeps

Binomial name
- Stephanorrhina princeps Oberthür, 1880

= Stephanorrhina princeps =

Species of beetle

Stephanorrhina princeps, common name spotted flower beetle, is a beetle from the family Scarabaeidae, subfamily Cetoniinae and tribe Goliathini.

== Description ==
Stephanorrhina princeps can reach about 22–30 millimetres (0.87–1.18 in) in length. It has usually a brilliant metallic green coloration, with bright white spots in the elytra. However the background may vary from purple to light-green. On the pronotum there are two dark green spots. Males have two small and two large horns (sexual dimorphism). Life cycle from egg to imago takes about six-eight months, with two-four months in cocoon stage. The adults feed on fruits and flowers. Life expectancy of adults is three-four months.

== Distribution ==
This species is an endemism of Malawi, Dedza.

== Subspecies ==
- Stephanorrhina princeps bamptoni Allard, 1984
- Stephanorrhina princeps princeps (Oberthür, 1880)
- Stephanorrhina princeps pygidiomaculata Schürhoff, 1935
