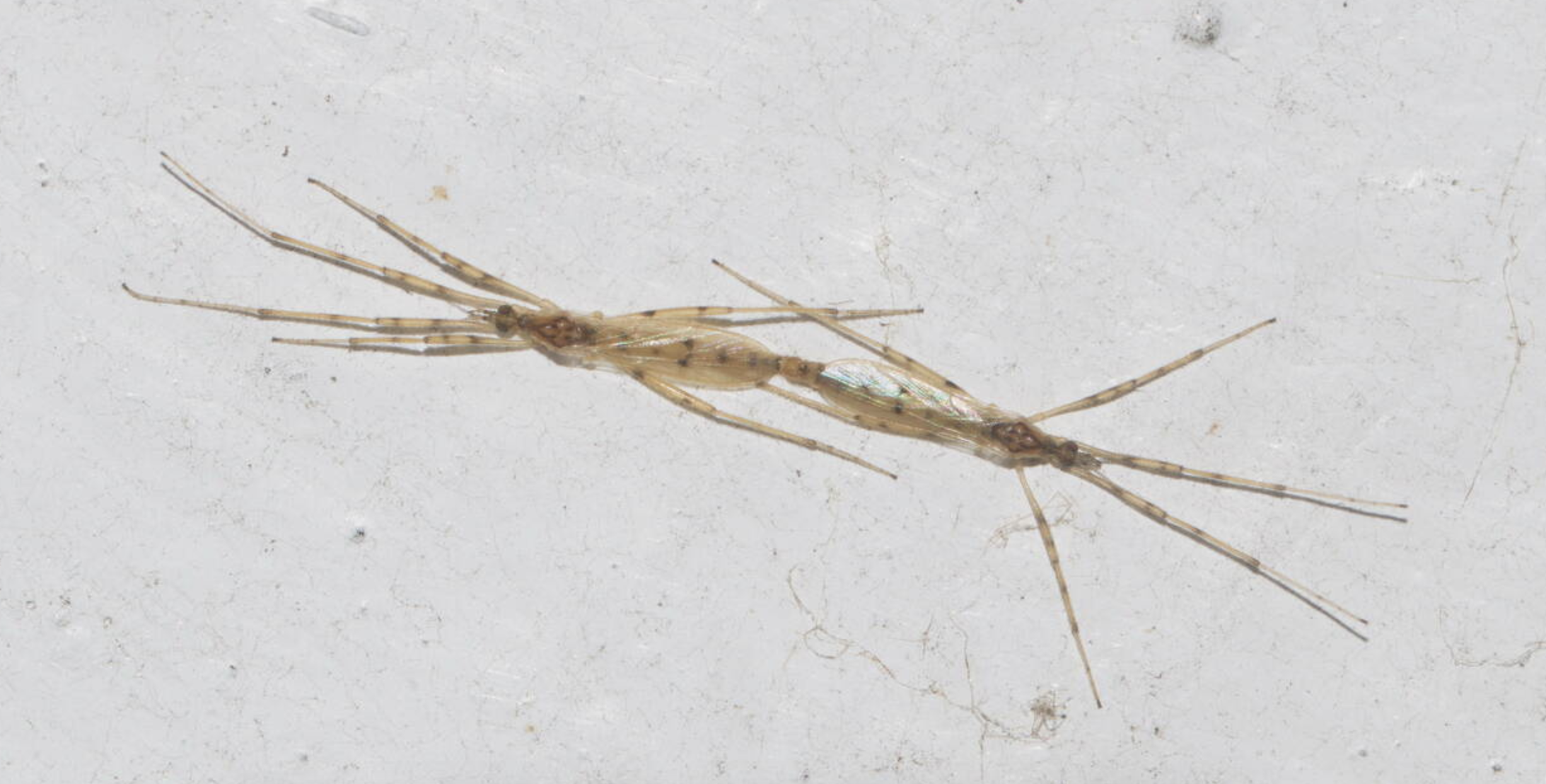
- Styringomyia didyma pair seen on Oahu

Scientific classification
- Kingdom: Animalia
- Phylum: Arthropoda
- Class: Insecta
- Order: Diptera
- Family: Limoniidae
- Tribe: Eriopterini
- Genus: Styringomyia; Loew, 1845

Type species
- Styringomyia venusta Loew, 1845 (fossil)

Species
- see text

Synonyms
- Styringia Berendt, 1845 (fossil); Idiophlebia Grunberg, 1903; Pycnocrepis Enderlein, 1912; Mesomyites Cockelrell, 1917 (fossil); Syringomyia Alexander, 1972

= Styringomyia =

Genus of flies

Styringomyia is a genus of crane fly in the family Limoniidae.

== Species ==
- S. acanthobasis Alexander, 1962
- S. acuapicalis Alexander, 1972
- S. acuta Edwards, 1926
- S. amazonica Ribeiro, 2003
- S. angustipennis Alexander, 1936
- S. angustitergata Alexander, 1938
- S. annulipes (Enderlein, 1912)
- S. apiculata Alexander, 1971
- S. armata Edwards, 1924
- S. atlantica Ribeiro, 2003
- S. bancrofti Edwards, 1914
- S. bicornuta Alexander, 1938
- S. bidens Hynes, 1987
- S. bidentata Hynes, 1987
- S. bipunctata Edwards, 1924
- S. biroi Edwards, 1924
- S. borneana Edwards, 1926
- S. bourbonensis Alexander, 1953
- S. bualae Hynes, 1988
- S. caudifera Alexander, 1953
- S. celebesensis Alexander, 1935
- S. cerbereana Alexander, 1976
- S. ceylonica Edwards, 1911
- S. chelifera Alexander, 1975
- S. claggi Alexander, 1931
- S. clandestina Alexander, 1956
- S. clio Alexander, 1953
- S. colona Edwards, 1927
- S. contorta Alexander, 1956
- S. cornuta Alexander, 1956
- S. crassicosta (Speiser, 1908)
- S. curvispina Edwards, 1931
- S. dendroides Alexander, 1930
- S. denticulata Alexander, 1953
- S. didyma Grimshaw, 1901
- S. digistostylus Hynes, 1987
- S. dilinhi Hynes, 1987
- S. ebejeri Hancock, 1997
- S. edwardsiana Alexander, 1930
- S. ensifera Edwards, 1924
- S. ensiferoides Alexander, 1948
- S. flava Brunetti, 1911
- S. flavitarsis Alexander, 1920
- S. flavocostalis Alexander, 1925
- S. formosana Edwards, 1914
- S. fryeri Edwards, 1914
- S. fulani Alexander, 1975
- S. fumipennis Edwards, 1926
- S. fumitergata Alexander, 1964
- S. fumosa Edwards, 1924
- S. furcata Alexander, 1956
- S. furcifera Alexander, 1976
- S. fuscinervis Edwards, 1925
- S. geminata Alexander, 1938
- S. halavana Alexander, 1951
- S. himalayana Edwards, 1914
- S. holomelania Alexander, 1936
- S. idioformosa Hynes, 1987
- S. impunctata Edwards, 1914
- S. ingrami Edwards, 1924
- S. jacobsoni Edwards, 1914
- S. javana Edwards, 1914
- S. kala Alexander, 1955
- S. kalabakanensis Hynes, 1988
- S. kempiana Alexander, 1942
- S. kerteszi Edwards, 1924
- S. kwangtungensis Alexander, 1949
- S. labuanae Hynes, 1987
- S. lambertoni Alexander, 1953
- S. leucopeza Edwards, 1914
- S. leucoplagia Alexander, 1953
- S. liberiensis Alexander, 1930
- S. lineaticeps Edwards, 1914
- S. longituberculata Alexander, 1956
- S. luteipennis Alexander, 1931
- S. mahensis Edwards, 1912
- S. manauara Ribeiro, 2003
- S. manicata Edwards, 1928
- S. marmorata Senior-White, 1924
- S. marshalli Edwards, 1914
- S. matileana Alexander, 1979
- S. maya Ribeiro, 2003
- S. mcgregori Alexander, 1925
- S. medleriana Alexander, 1972
- S. melanaspis Alexander, 1971
- S. melania Edwards, 1925
- S. melanopinax Alexander, 1948
- S. mitra Alexander, 1955
- S. moheliana Alexander, 1959
- S. monochaeta Alexander, 1970
- S. montina Alexander, 1931
- S. multisetosa Alexander, 1964
- S. mystica Alexander, 1945
- S. neocaledoniae Alexander, 1948
- S. neocolona Alexander, 1931
- S. nepalensis Edwards, 1914
- S. nigripalpis Edwards, 1914
- S. nigrisoma Alexander, 1956
- S. nigrobarbata Alexander, 1971
- S. nigrofemorata Edwards, 1914
- S. nigrosternata Alexander, 1931
- S. nipponensis Alexander, 1929
- S. nirvana Alexander, 1955
- S. obscura Brunetti, 1911
- S. obscuricincta Edwards, 1924
- S. obuduensis Alexander, 1975
- S. occidentalis Edwards, 1924
- S. omeiensis Alexander, 1935
- S. papuana Edwards, 1924
- S. paulista Alexander, 1946
- S. pendula Alexander, 1937
- S. pentachaeta Alexander, 1970
- S. phallosomica Alexander, 1964
- S. phallosomica Alexander, 1975
- S. platystyla Alexander, 1962
- S. princeps Alexander, 1943
- S. quadridivisa Alexander, 1972
- S. recurvata Alexander, 1975
- S. reducta Alexander, 1938
- S. rostrostylus Hynes, 1987
- S. sabroskyi Alexander, 1972
- S. scalaris Alexander, 1962
- S. schmidiana Alexander, 1957
- S. schoutedeni Alexander, 1930
- S. separata Alexander, 1935
- S. serristylata Alexander, 1930
- S. sessilis Alexander, 1972
- S. setifera Alexander, 1964
- S. siberiensis Alexander, 1935
- S. simplex Alexander, 1945
- S. sinensis Alexander, 1930
- S. sjostedti Edwards, 1914
- S. soembana Edwards, 1932
- S. solocipennis (Enderlein, 1912)
- S. solomonensis Alexander, 1951
- S. spathulata Alexander, 1937
- S. spinicaudata Alexander, 1936
- S. spinistylata Alexander, 1956
- S. stenophallus Alexander, 1975
- S. stuckenbergi Alexander, 1958
- S. subimmaculata Alexander, 1950
- S. subobscura Alexander, 1966
- S. susilae Alexander, 1942
- S. tablasensis Alexander, 1929
- S. taiwanensis Alexander, 1930
- S. tarsatra Alexander, 1966
- S. tenuispina Alexander, 1971
- S. tenuisterna Alexander, 1960
- S. tergata Alexander, 1960
- S. terraereginae Alexander, 1924
- S. thetis Alexander, 1949
- S. transversa Edwards, 1926
- S. trifurciscutata Hynes, 1988
- S. trilobula Alexander, 1972
- S. variegata Edwards, 1914
- S. vietnamensis Hynes, 1987
- S. vittata Edwards, 1914
- S. vritra Alexander, 1955
- S. xenophallus Alexander, 1956
- S. youngi Ribeiro, 2003
- S. ysabellae Hynes, 1987
