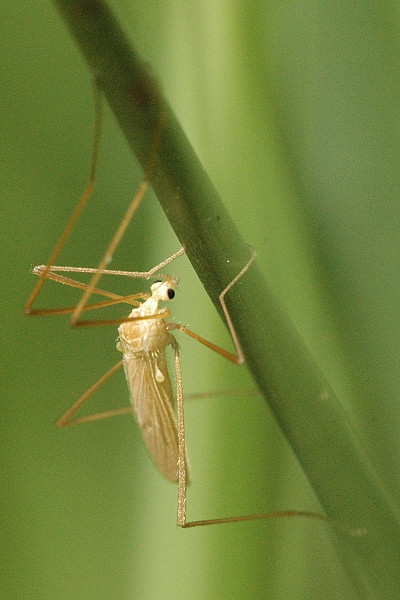
- Erioptera flavata

Scientific classification
- Kingdom: Animalia
- Phylum: Arthropoda
- Class: Insecta
- Order: Diptera
- Family: Limoniidae
- Subfamily: Chioneinae; Rondani, 1861

Tribes
- Cladurini; Eriopterini; Gonomyiini; Molophilini

Synonyms
- Eriopterinae

= Chioneinae =

Subfamily of flies

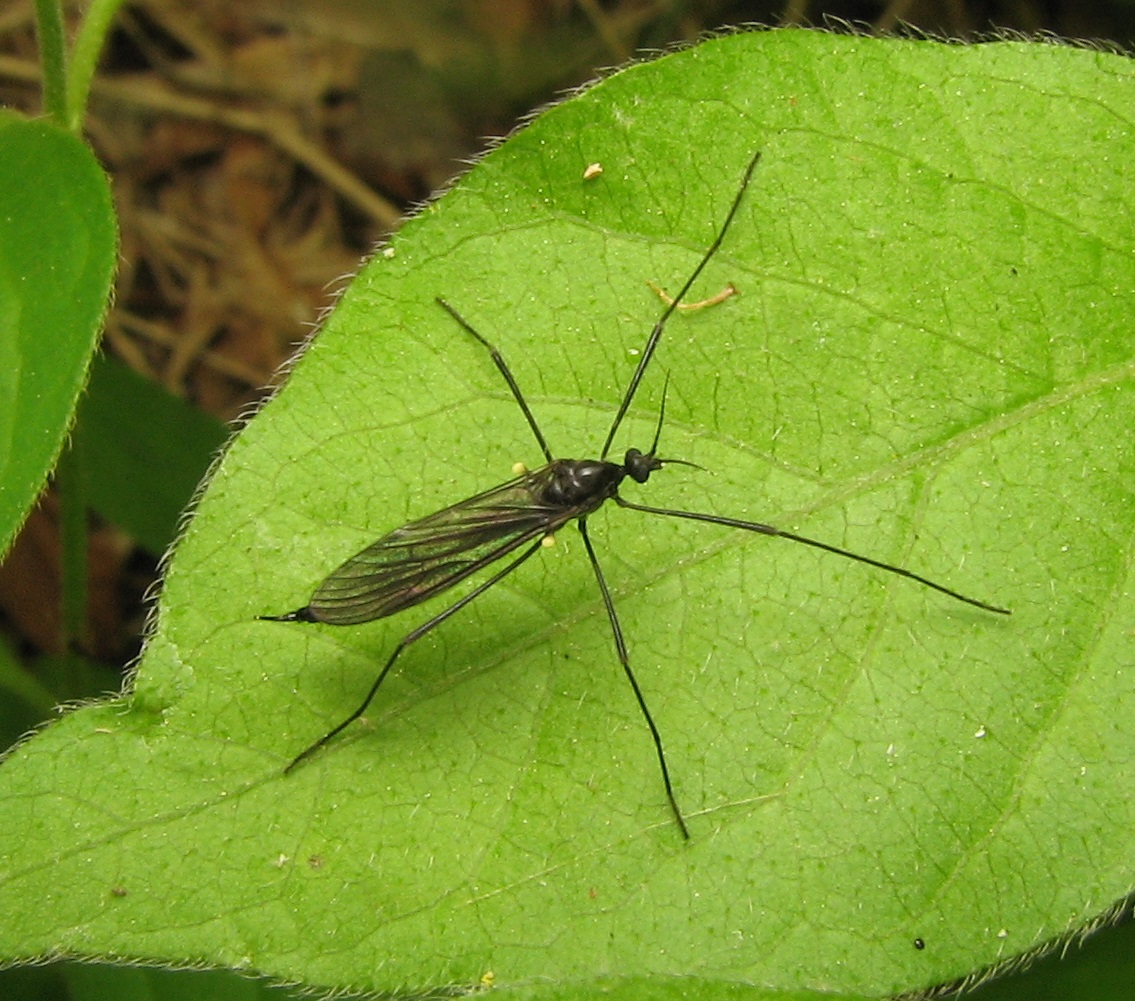
Gnophomyia tristissima

The Chioneinae are a subfamily of limoniid crane flies.

This subfamily was known as Eriopterinae until 1992.

== Systematics ==
This list is adapted from the "Catalogue of the Craneflies of the World (Diptera, Tipuloidea: Pediciidae, Limoniidae, Cylindrotomidae, Tipulidae)". Naturalis Biodiversity Center. (January 2007). However, tribe affiliation is taken from Fauna Europaea; thus genera that include no European species are given below. then refined from Savchenko, Oosterbroek & Stary

- Tribe Cladurini Mendl, 1979
  - Chionea Dalman, 1816
  - Cladura Osten-Sacken, 1860
  - Crypteria Bergroth, 1913
  - Franckomyia Alexander, 1936
  - Neolimnophila Alexander, 1920
- Tribe Eriopterini
  - Arctoconopa Alexander, 1955
  - Baeoura Alexander, 1924
  - Beringomyia Savchenko, 1980
  - Erioptera Meigen, 1803
  - Gonempeda Alexander, 1924
  - Gonomyodes Alexander, 1948
  - Gonomyopsis Alexander, 1966
  - Hesperoconopa Alexander, 1948
  - Scleroprocta Edwards, 1938
  - Styringomyia Loew, 1845
  - Symplecta Meigen, 1830
- Tribe Gonomyiini
  - Dasymallomyia Brunetti, 1911
  - Ellipteroides Becker, 1907
  - Gnophomyia Osten-Sacken, 1860
  - Gonomyia Meigen, 1818
  - Gymnastes Brunetti, 1911
  - Idiocera Dale, 1842
  - Idiognophomyia Alexander, 1956
  - Rhabdomastix Skuse, 1890
  - Teucholabis Osten-Sacken, 1860
- Tribe Molophilini Savchenko & Krivolutskaya, 1976
  - Cheilotrichia Rossi, 1848
  - Erioconopa Starý, 1976
  - Hoplolabis Osten-Sacken, 1869
  - Hoverioptera Alexander, 1963
  - Ilisia Rondani, 1856
  - Molophilus Curtis, 1833
  - Ormosia Rondani, 1856
  - Rhypholophus Kolenati, 1860
  - Tasiocera Skuse, 1890
- Unknown tribe
  - Amphineurus Skuse, 1890
  - Aphrophila Edwards, 1923
  - Atarba Osten-Sacken, 1869
  - Aymaramyia Alexander, 1943
  - Cryptolabis Osten-Sacken, 1860
  - Empedomorpha Alexander, 1916
  - Eriopterella Alexander, 1929
  - Eriopterodes Alexander, 1970
  - Eugnophomyia Alexander, 1947
  - Gymnastes Brunetti, 1911
  - Horistomyia Alexander, 1924
  - Hovamyia Alexander, 1951
  - Jivaromyia Alexander, 1943
  - Limnophilomyia Alexander, 1921
  - Maietta Alexander, 1929
  - Neocladura Alexander, 1920
  - Neognophomyia Alexander, 1926
  - Neophilippiana Alexander, 1964
  - Phantolabis Alexander, 1956
  - Phyllolabis Osten-Sacken, 1877
  - Quathlambia Alexander, 1956
  - Quechuamyia Alexander, 1943
  - Riedelomyia Alexander, 1928
  - Sigmatomera Osten-Sacken, 1869
  - Tasiocerellus Alexander, 1958
  - Trichotrimicra Alexander, 1921
  - Unguicrypteria Alexander, 1981

Dicranoptycha Osten Sacken, 1860 and Lipsothrix Loew, 1873 were moved to subfamily Limoniinae.
