= Ellipteroides =

Scientific classification
- Kingdom: Animalia
- Phylum: Arthropoda
- Class: Insecta
- Order: Diptera
- Family: Limoniidae
- Subfamily: Chioneinae
- Genus: Ellipteroides; Becker, 1907

Type species
- E. piceus Becker, 1907

Subgenera
- Ellipteroides Becker, 1907; Progonomyia Alexander, 1920; Protogonomyia Alexander, 1934; Ptilostenodes Alexander, 1931; Ramagonomyia Alexander, 1968; Sivagonomyia Alexander, 1968

Genus of flies

Ellipteroides is a genus of crane fly in the family Limoniidae.

== Species ==
- Subgenus Ellipteroides Becker, 1907
  - E. atropolitus (Alexander, 1937)
  - E. bifastigatus Mendl, 1987
  - E. brunnescens (Edwards, 1926)
  - E. ebenomyia (Alexander, 1959)
  - E. friesei (Mannheims, 1967)
  - E. lateralis (Macquart, 1835)
  - E. meioneurus (Alexander, 1962)
  - E. piceus Becker, 1907
  - E. pictilis (Alexander, 1958)
  - E. rohuna (Alexander, 1958)
  - E. schmidi (Alexander, 1957)
  - E. tenebrosus (Edwards, 1928)
  - E. terebrellus (Alexander, 1931)
  - E. thiasodes (Alexander, 1958)
- Subgenus Progonomyia Alexander, 1920
  - E. acanthias (Alexander, 1941)
  - E. acrissimus (Alexander, 1944)
  - E. adelus (Alexander, 1949)
  - E. alatus (Alexander, 1981)
  - E. altivolans (Alexander, 1942)
  - E. argentinensis (Alexander, 1920)
  - E. atroapicatus (Alexander, 1938)
  - E. balzapambae (Alexander, 1941)
  - E. bifasciolatus (Alexander, 1937)
  - E. brevifurca (Alexander, 1917)
  - E. catamarcensis (Alexander, 1941)
  - E. chiloensis (Alexander, 1969)
  - E. compactus (Alexander, 1941)
  - E. destrictus (Alexander, 1939)
  - E. dolorosus (Alexander, 1922)
  - E. eriopteroides (Alexander, 1926)
  - E. fieldi (Alexander, 1966)
  - E. flaveolus (Alexander, 1921)
  - E. forceps (Alexander, 1941)
  - E. hesperius (Alexander, 1926)
  - E. histrionicus (Alexander, 1943)
  - E. hyperplatys (Alexander, 1944)
  - E. maestus (Alexander, 1921)
  - E. magistratus (Alexander, 1949)
  - E. melampodius (Alexander, 1979)
  - E. natalensis (Alexander, 1917)
  - E. nigrobimbo (Alexander, 1934)
  - E. nigroluteus (Alexander, 1971)
  - E. ominosus (Alexander, 1926)
  - E. ovalis (Alexander, 1949)
  - E. paraensis (Alexander, 1920)
  - E. paramoensis (Alexander, 1944)
  - E. patruelis (Alexander, 1930)
  - E. perturbatus (Alexander, 1930)
  - E. peruvianus (Alexander, 1922)
  - E. platymerellus (Alexander, 1947)
  - E. pleurolineatus (Alexander, 1929)
  - E. plumbeus (Alexander, 1946)
  - E. pulchrissimus (Alexander, 1921)
  - E. quinqueplagiatus (Alexander, 1931)
  - E. saturatus (Alexander, 1937)
  - E. saxicola (Alexander, 1923)
  - E. serenus (Alexander, 1922)
  - E. slossonae (Alexander, 1914)
  - E. subcostatus (Alexander, 1919)
  - E. subsaturatus (Alexander, 1942)
  - E. synchrous (Alexander, 1929)
  - E. tessellatus (Alexander, 1943)
  - E. thiosema (Alexander, 1921)
  - E. transvaalensis (Alexander, 1960)
  - E. tridens (Alexander, 1979)
  - E. velutinus (Alexander, 1916)
  - E. weiseri (Alexander, 1920)
  - E. zionicola (Alexander, 1948)
- Subgenus Protogonomyia Alexander, 1934
  - E. acucurvatus (Alexander, 1968)
  - E. acustylatus (Alexander, 1962)
  - E. adrastea Stary and Mendl, 1984
  - E. aitholodes (Alexander, 1961)
  - E. alboscutellatus (von Roser, 1840)
  - E. alomatus (Alexander, 1963)
  - E. apocryphus (Alexander, 1968)
  - E. chaoi (Alexander, 1949)
  - E. clista (Alexander, 1962)
  - E. clitellatus (Alexander, 1934)
  - E. cobelura (Alexander, 1973)
  - E. confluentus (Alexander, 1924)
  - E. contostyla (Alexander, 1968)
  - E. distifurca (Alexander, 1962)
  - E. glabristyla (Alexander, 1968)
  - E. gracilis (Brunetti, 1918)
  - E. hutsoni (Stary, 1971)
  - E. ida Stary and Mendl, 1984
  - E. lateromacula (Alexander, 1968)
  - E. lenis (Alexander, 1937)
  - E. limbatus (von Roser, 1840)
  - E. megalomatus (Alexander, 1962)
  - E. namtokensis (Alexander, 1953)
  - E. neapiculatus (Alexander and Alexander, 1973)
  - E. nigripes (Brunetti, 1912)
  - E. nilgirianus (Alexander, 1950)
  - E. pakistanicus (Alexander, 1957)
  - E. pellax (Alexander, 1968)
  - E. praetenuis (Alexander, 1945)
  - E. quadridens loehmeri Mendl, 1987
  - E. quadridens quadridens (Savchenko, 1972)
  - E. rejectus (Alexander, 1968)
  - E. scoteinus (Alexander, 1968)
  - E. scutellumalbum (Alexander, 1923)
  - E. strenuus (Brunetti, 1912)
  - E. thiorhopalus (Alexander, 1962)
  - E. tienmuensis (Alexander, 1940)
- Subgenus Ptilostenodes Alexander, 1931
  - E. amiculus (Alexander, 1936)
  - E. capitulus (Alexander, 1968)
  - E. omissus (Lackschewitz, 1940)
  - E. pakistanensis (Alexander, 1957)
  - E. ptilostenellus javanicus (Alexander, 1931)
  - E. ptilostenellus ptilostenellus (Alexander, 1931)
  - E. ptilostenoides (Alexander, 1928)
  - E. stenomerus (Alexander, 1968)
  - E. uniplagiatus (Alexander, 1937)
- Subgenus Ramagonomyia Alexander, 1968
  - E. bisiculifer (Alexander, 1963)
  - E. protensus (Alexander, 1963)
- Subgenus Sivagonomyia Alexander, 1968
  - E. discolophallos (Alexander, 1968)
