= T. fenestrata =

T. fenestrata may refer to:

- Tabellaria fenestrata, a diatom species in the genus Tabellaria
- Tectura fenestrata, Reeve, 1855, a sea snail species in the genus Tectura
- Teucholabis fenestrata, Osten Sacken, 1888, a crane fly species in the genus Teucholabis
- Trentepohlia fenestrata, Alexander, 1956, a crane fly species in the genus Trentepohlia

== See also ==
- Fenestrata (disambiguation)
