= Riedelomyia =

Scientific classification
- Kingdom: Animalia
- Phylum: Arthropoda
- Class: Insecta
- Order: Diptera
- Family: Limoniidae
- Subfamily: Chioneinae
- Genus: Riedelomyia; Alexander, 1928

Type species
- Riedelomyia gratiosa Alexander, 1928

Species
- see text

Genus of flies

Riedelomyia is a genus of crane fly in the family Limoniidae.

== Distribution ==
India, Fiji & Papua New Guinea.

== Species ==
- R. chionopus Alexander, 1949
- R. gratiosa Alexander, 1928
- R. lipoleuca Alexander, 1969
- R. niveiapicalis (Brunetti, 1918)
- R. papuensis Alexander, 1941
- R. teucholabina (Alexander, 1921)
