= Crypteria =

Scientific classification
- Kingdom: Animalia
- Phylum: Arthropoda
- Class: Insecta
- Order: Diptera
- Family: Limoniidae
- Subfamily: Chioneinae
- Genus: Crypteria; Bergroth, 1913

Type species
- C. limnophiloides Bergroth, 1913

Subgenera
- Crypteria Bergroth, 1913; Franckomyia Alexander, 1936

Genus of flies

Crypteria is a genus of crane fly in the family Limoniidae.

== Species ==
- Subgenus Crypteria Bergroth, 1913
  - C. basistylata Alexander, 1960
  - C. claripennis (Brunetti, 1913)
  - C. haploa Alexander, 1960
  - C. limnophiloides Bergroth, 1913
  - C. luteipennis Alexander, 1938
  - C. spectralis Alexander, 1935
- Subgenus Franckomyia Alexander, 1936
  - C. discalis (Alexander, 1936)
  - C. israelica Stary & Freidberg, 2007
  - C. recessiva (Alexander, 1927)
  - C. stylophora Alexander, 1962
