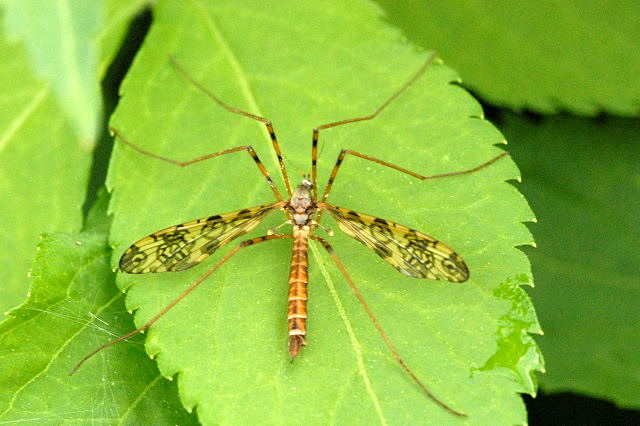
- Epiphragma ocellare

Scientific classification
- Domain: Eukaryota
- Kingdom: Animalia
- Phylum: Arthropoda
- Class: Insecta
- Order: Diptera
- Family: Limoniidae
- Subfamily: Limnophilinae
- Genus: Epiphragma; Osten Sacken, 1860

Type species
- Limnophila pavonina Osten Sacken, 1860 [= fasciapenne (Say, 1823)]

Subgenera
- Epiphragma Osten Sacken, 1860; Eupolyphragma Alexander, 1948; Lipophragma Alexander, 1978; Parepiphragma Alexander, 1960

= Epiphragma =

Genus of flies

Epiphragma is a genus of crane fly in the family Limoniidae.

== Species ==
- Subgenus Epiphragma Osten Sacken, 1860
  - E. adoxum Alexander, 1953
  - E. adspersum (Wiedemann, 1828)
  - E. amphileucum Alexander, 1941
  - E. ancistrum Mao & Yang, 2009
  - E. annulicorne Alexander, 1921
  - E. arizonense Alexander, 1946
  - E. atroterminatum Alexander, 1943
  - E. auricosta Alexander, 1939
  - E. bicinctiferum Alexander, 1935
  - E. binigrocinctum Alexander, 1962
  - E. breve Mao & Yang, 2009
  - E. buscki Alexander, 1913
  - E. caligatum Alexander, 1954
  - E. caribicum Alexander, 1970
  - E. celator Alexander, 1946
  - E. chionopezum Alexander, 1960
  - E. circinatum Osten Sacken, 1886
  - E. claudia Alexander, 1946
  - E. collessi Theischinger, 1996
  - E. commopterum Alexander, 1966
  - E. cordillerense Alexander, 1913
  - E. cubense Alexander, 1930
  - E. cynotis Alexander, 1946
  - E. delectabile Alexander, 1979
  - E. deliberatum Alexander, 1939
  - E. delicatulum Osten Sacken, 1888
  - E. diadema Alexander, 1939
  - E. distivena Alexander, 1932
  - E. divisum Alexander, 1923
  - E. dysaithrium Alexander, 1966
  - E. dysommatum Alexander, 1965
  - E. elongatum Mao & Yang, 2009
  - E. enixoides Alexander, 1962
  - E. enixum Alexander, 1939
  - E. evanescens Alexander, 1940
  - E. fabricii Alexander, 1913
  - E. farri Alexander, 1951
  - E. fasciapenne (Say, 1823)
  - E. felix Alexander, 1943
  - E. filiforme Alexander, 1940
  - E. fuscodiscale Alexander, 1936
  - E. fuscoterminale Alexander, 1948
  - E. gaigei Alexander, 1929
  - E. genuale Alexander, 1934
  - E. gloriolum Alexander, 1936
  - E. gracilicorne Alexander, 1916
  - E. gracilistylus Alexander, 1933
  - E. hardyi Alexander, 1922
  - E. hebridense Alexander, 1924
  - E. hirtistylatum Alexander, 1939
  - E. histrio Schiner, 1868
  - E. howense Alexander, 1922
  - E. illingworthi (Alexander, 1921)
  - E. imitans Alexander, 1913
  - E. immaculipes Alexander, 1941
  - E. inaequicinctum Alexander, 1941
  - E. inornatipes Alexander, 1939
  - E. insigne van der Wulp, 1878
  - E. insperatum Alexander, 1960
  - E. interspersum Alexander, 1953
  - E. juquicola Alexander, 1945
  - E. jurator Alexander, 1948
  - E. kempi Brunetti, 1913
  - E. kerberti de Meijere, 1919
  - E. klossi Brunetti, 1918
  - E. lipophleps Alexander, 1979
  - E. mediale Mao & Yang, 2009
  - E. melaxanthum Alexander, 1943
  - E. mephistophelicum Alexander, 1947
  - E. meridionalis Alexander, 1928
  - E. mithras Alexander, 1949
  - E. muscicola Alexander, 1943
  - E. nebulosum (Bellardi, 1859)
  - E. nephele Alexander, 1948
  - E. nigripleuralis Alexander, 1945
  - E. nigroplagiatum Alexander, 1939
  - E. nymphicum Alexander, 1928
  - E. ocellare (Linnaeus, 1760)
  - E. oreonympha Alexander, 1928
  - E. ornatipenne (Brunetti, 1918)
  - E. oxyphallus Alexander, 1939
  - E. parviseta Alexander, 1941
  - E. pendleburyi Edwards, 1928
  - E. perocellatum Alexander, 1966
  - E. persanctum Alexander, 1938
  - E. petalinum Alexander, 1947
  - E. petulantia Alexander, 1948
  - E. phaeoxanthum Alexander, 1944
  - E. punctatissimum (Wiedemann, 1828)
  - E. pupillatum Alexander, 1913
  - E. retrorsum Alexander, 1968
  - E. rhododendri Alexander, 1966
  - E. risorium Alexander, 1962
  - E. sackeni Williston, 1896
  - E. sappho Alexander, 1943
  - E. schmiederi Alexander, 1968
  - E. scoptes Alexander, 1965
  - E. septuosum Alexander, 1962
  - E. serristyla Alexander, 1945
  - E. signatum de Meijere, 1911
  - E. solatrix (Osten Sacken, 1860)
  - E. subenixum Alexander, 1939
  - E. subfascipenne Alexander, 1920
  - E. subinsigne Alexander, 1920
  - E. subobsoletum Alexander, 1936
  - E. subsolatrix Alexander, 1939
  - E. subvicinum Alexander, 1966
  - E. sultanum Alexander, 1938
  - E. sybariticum Alexander, 1947
  - E. terraereginae Alexander, 1922
  - E. trichomerum Alexander, 1955
  - E. varium (Wiedemann, 1828)
  - E. vicinum Brunetti, 1918
  - E. xanthomela Alexander, 1939
  - E. yunnanense Mao & Yang, 2009
- Subgenus Eupolyphragma Alexander, 1948
  - E. angusticrenulum Alexander, 1931
  - E. apoense Alexander, 1931
  - E. bakeri Alexander, 1922
  - E. caninotum Alexander, 1931
  - E. cinereinotum Alexander, 1931
  - E. crenulatum Alexander, 1930
  - E. flavosternatum Alexander, 1930
  - E. fulvinotum Alexander, 1931
  - E. fuscinotum Alexander, 1931
  - E. fuscofasciatum Alexander, 1931
  - E. fuscosternatum Alexander, 1930
  - E. griseicapillum Alexander, 1931
  - E. hastatum Alexander, 1931
  - E. incisurale Alexander, 1932
  - E. joculator Alexander, 1960
  - E. latitergatum Alexander, 1931
  - E. minahassanum Alexander, 1935
  - E. multiplex Alexander, 1960
  - E. nigrotibiatum Alexander, 1931
  - E. ochrinotum Alexander, 1930
  - E. parvilobum Alexander, 1931
  - E. riveranum Alexander, 1932
  - E. staplesi Alexander, 1948
  - E. subcrenulatum Alexander, 1931
  - E. triarmatum Alexander, 1931
- Subgenus Lipophragma Alexander, 1978
  - E. garrigoui (Alexander, 1948)
- Subgenus Parepiphragma Alexander, 1960
  - E. (Parepiphragma) perideles Alexander, 1960
- Uncertain placement:
  - E. infractum Alexander, 1948
