= Atarba =

Scientific classification
- Kingdom: Animalia
- Phylum: Arthropoda
- Class: Insecta
- Order: Diptera
- Family: Limoniidae
- Subfamily: Chioneinae
- Genus: Atarba; Osten Sacken, 1869

Type species
- A. picticornis Osten Sacken, 1869

Subgernera
- Atarba Osten Sacken, 1869; Atarbodes Alexander, 1920; Ischnothrix Bigot, 1888

Genus of flies

Atarba is a genus of crane fly in the family Limoniidae.

== Species ==
- Subgenus Atarba Osten Sacken, 1869

- A. almeidai Alexander, 1946
- A. amabilis Alexander, 1928
- A. angustipennis Alexander, 1928
- A. anthracina Alexander, 1937
- A. apache Alexander, 1949
- A. aperta Alexander, 1926
- A. apicispinosa Alexander, 1934
- A. bellamyi Alexander, 1950
- A. bifilosa Alexander, 1948
- A. bifurcula Alexander, 1931
- A. bipendula Alexander, 1966
- A. biproducta Alexander, 1966
- A. boliviana Alexander, 1930
- A. brevicornis Alexander, 1929
- A. brevissima Alexander, 1944
- A. brunneicornis Alexander, 1916
- A. bulbifera Alexander, 1943
- A. capensis Alexander, 1917
- A. cincticornis Alexander, 1916
- A. circe Alexander, 1946
- A. columbiana Alexander, 1913
- A. cucullata Alexander, 1946
- A. dasycera Alexander, 1948
- A. diacantha Alexander, 1945
- A. dilatistyla Alexander, 1966
- A. dinematophora Alexander, 1943
- A. distispina Alexander, 1969
- A. fiebrigi Alexander, 1922
- A. fieldiana Alexander, 1969
- A. filicornis Alexander, 1922
- A. forticornis Alexander, 1947
- A. fuscoapicalis Alexander, 1944
- A. heteracantha Alexander, 1943
- A. hirticornis Alexander, 1943
- A. idonea Alexander, 1939
- A. incisurata Alexander, 1938
- A. laddeyana Alexander, 1944
- A. laterospina Alexander, 1962
- A. longitergata Alexander, 1945
- A. lyriformis Alexander, 1966
- A. macracantha Alexander, 1943
- A. margarita Alexander, 1979
- A. megaphallus Alexander, 1921
- A. melanomera Alexander, 1943
- A. merita Alexander, 1938
- A. mexicana Alexander, 1926
- A. microphallus Alexander, 1944
- A. multiarmata Alexander, 1943
- A. nodulosa Alexander, 1939
- A. pallidapex Alexander, 1943
- A. panamensis Alexander, 1969
- A. perincisa Alexander, 1948
- A. picticornis Osten Sacken, 1869
- A. procericornis Alexander, 1944
- A. punctiscuta Alexander, 1922
- A. pustulata Alexander, 1969
- A. quasimodo Alexander, 1950
- A. religiosa Alexander, 1946
- A. restricta Alexander, 1943
- A. scabrosa Alexander, 1944
- A. scutata Alexander, 1939
- A. serena Alexander, 1969
- A. setilobata Alexander, 1964
- A. sigmoidea Alexander, 1979
- A. stigmosa Alexander, 1930
- A. stuckenbergi Alexander, 1960
- A. subdentata Alexander, 1952
- A. subpatens Alexander, 1969
- A. tatei Alexander, 1929
- A. tetracantha Alexander, 1945
- A. tuberculifera Alexander, 1943
- A. tungurahuensis Alexander, 1946
- A. unilateralis Alexander, 1931
- A. varicornis Alexander, 1913
- A. variispina Alexander, 1938
- A. viridicolor Alexander, 1922
- A. werneri Alexander, 1949

- Subgenus Atarbodes Alexander, 1920

- A. apoensis Alexander, 1932
- A. argentata Edwards, 1928
- A. bilobula Alexander, 1969
- A. bipunctulata Alexander, 1932
- A. bismila Alexander, 1969
- A. crassispina Alexander, 1972
- A. decincta Alexander, 1969
- A. dicera Alexander, 1969
- A. dolichophallus Alexander, 1960
- A. fasciata Edwards, 1926
- A. flava Brunetti, 1912
- A. fuscicornis Edwards, 1916
- A. hemimelas Alexander, 1960
- A. infuscata Edwards, 1928
- A. intermedia Alexander, 1956
- A. issikiana Alexander, 1930
- A. javanica Alexander, 1915
- A. jeanneli (Riedel, 1914)
- A. leptophallus Alexander, 1964
- A. leptoxantha Alexander, 1928
- A. limbata Edwards, 1933
- A. marginata Edwards, 1928
- A. minuticornis Alexander, 1930
- A. pallidicornis Edwards, 1916
- A. rhodesiae Alexander, 1948
- A. sikkimensis Alexander, 1969
- A. tergata Alexander, 1958
- A. tergatoides Alexander, 1965
- A. trimelania Alexander, 1963

- Subgenus Ischnothrix Bigot, 1888

- A. aetherea (Bigot, 1888)
- A. aprica Alexander, 1962
- A. argentinicola (Alexander, 1921)
- A. augusta Theischinger, 1994
- A. australasiae (Skuse, 1890)
- A. berthae Alexander, 1948
- A. bickeli Theischinger, 1996
- A. brevilyra Alexander, 1966
- A. brevisector (Alexander, 1935)
- A. capitella Alexander, 1946
- A. confluenta (Alexander, 1924)
- A. connexa (Alexander, 1923)
- A. delicatula (Philippi, 1866)
- A. digitifera Alexander, 1946
- A. eluta (Edwards, 1923)
- A. fidelis (Alexander, 1929)
- A. geminata Alexander, 1943
- A. generosa (Alexander, 1922)
- A. grampiana (Alexander, 1931)
- A. helenae Alexander, 1948
- A. ignithorax (Alexander, 1929)
- A. integra Alexander, 1980
- A. integriloba Alexander, 1943
- A. iyouta Theischinger, 1994
- A. lawsonensis (Skuse, 1890)
- A. lloydi (Alexander, 1913)
- A. mathewsi (Alexander, 1931)
- A. melanolyra Alexander, 1980
- A. mesocera (Alexander, 1929)
- A. millaamillaa Theischinger, 1994
- A. obtusiloba Alexander, 1944
- A. patens (Alexander, 1940)
- A. picturata (Alexander, 1929)
- A. polyspila Alexander, 1971
- A. rectangularis Alexander, 1955
- A. scutellata (Alexander, 1929)
- A. seticornis Alexander, 1946
- A. spinituber Alexander, 1950
- A. subaequalis Alexander, 1979
- A. supplicata Alexander, 1943
- A. tenuissima (Alexander, 1929)
- A. thowla Theischinger, 1994
- A. verticalis (Alexander, 1929)
- A. voracis Alexander, 1948
- A. waylehmina Theischinger, 1994
- A. williamsi Theischinger, 1994
