= Idiocera =

Scientific classification
- Kingdom: Animalia
- Phylum: Arthropoda
- Class: Insecta
- Order: Diptera
- Family: Limoniidae
- Subfamily: Chioneinae
- Genus: Idiocera; Dale, 1842

Type species
- Limnobia sexguttata Dale, 1842

Subgenera
- Euptilostena Alexander, 1938; Idiocera Dale, 1842

Synonyms
- Ptilostena Bergroth, 1913; Pseudogonomyia Santos Abreu, 1923

Genus of flies

Idiocera is a genus of crane fly in the family Limoniidae.

== Species ==
- Subgenus Euptilostena Alexander, 1938

- I. arabiensis Hancock, 1997
- I. dampfiana (Alexander, 1938)
- I. jucunda (Loew, 1873)
- I. knowltoniana (Alexander, 1948)
- I. moghalica (Alexander, 1961)
- I. multipunctata Savchenko, 1982
- I. paulsi Stary and Ujvarosi, 2005
- I. polingi (Alexander, 1946)
- I. reticulata (Alexander, 1922)
- I. supernumeraria (Alexander, 1938)

- Subgenus Idiocera Dale, 1842

- I. abjecta (Alexander, 1933)
- I. absona (Alexander, 1956)
- I. acaenophallos (Alexander, 1968)
- I. accincta (Alexander, 1957)
- I. acifurca (Alexander, 1955)
- I. afghanica (Nielsen, 1963)
- I. aldabrensis (Edwards, 1912)
- I. alexanderiana (Lackschewitz, 1940)
- I. ampullifera (Stary, 1979)
- I. angustissima (Alexander, 1928)
- I. antilopina Stary, 1982
- I. apicispina (Alexander, 1926)
- I. arete (Alexander, 1958)
- I. biacus (Alexander, 1948)
- I. bidens Savchenko, 1979
- I. bipilata (Alexander, 1957)
- I. bistylata (Alexander, 1958)
- I. blanda (Osten Sacken, 1860)
- I. bradleyi (Edwards, 1939)
- I. brookmani (Alexander, 1944)
- I. buettikeri Hancock, 1997
- I. californica (Alexander, 1916)
- I. cockerelli (Alexander, 1929)
- I. coheriana (Alexander, 1959)
- I. collessi Theischinger, 1994
- I. coloradica (Alexander, 1920)
- I. conchiformis (Alexander, 1958)
- I. connexa (Loew, 1873)
- I. contracta (Alexander, 1960)
- I. cotabatoensis (Alexander, 1934)
- I. curticellula (Alexander, 1930)
- I. curticurva (Alexander, 1975)
- I. daedalus (Alexander, 1956)
- I. displosa (Alexander, 1957)
- I. flintiana (Alexander, 1961)
- I. furcosa (Alexander, 1968)
- I. gaigei (Rogers, 1931)
- I. glabriapicalis (Alexander, 1948)
- I. gorokana (Alexander, 1973)
- I. gothicana (Alexander, 1943)
- I. gunvorae (Alexander, 1964)
- I. hainanensis (Alexander, 1936)
- I. hasta Stary, 1982
- I. heteroclada (Alexander, 1966)
- I. hofufensis Hancock, 1997
- I. hoogstraali (Alexander, 1946)
- I. impavida (Alexander, 1948)
- I. insidiosa (Alexander, 1938)
- I. involuta (Alexander, 1961)
- I. kashongensis (Alexander, 1968)
- I. kowalskii Stary and Krzeminski, 1984
- I. kuwayamai (Alexander, 1926)
- I. lackschewitzi (Stary, 1977)
- I. lamia (Alexander, 1968)
- I. lanciformis Hancock, 1997
- I. laterospina (Alexander, 1975)
- I. leda (Alexander, 1968)
- I. leechi (Alexander, 1964)
- I. lindseyi (Alexander, 1946)
- I. lobatostylata Hancock, 1997
- I. longipennis (Alexander, 1935)
- I. lordosis (Alexander, 1960)
- I. magra (Alexander, 1962)
- I. maharaja (Alexander, 1961)
- I. malagasica (Alexander, 1953)
- I. mashonensis (Alexander, 1959)
- I. mathesoni (Alexander, 1915)
- I. megastigma (Alexander, 1970)
- I. metatarsata (de Meijere, 1911)
- I. multiarmata (Alexander, 1940)
- I. multistylata (Alexander, 1948)
- I. myriacantha (Alexander, 1957)
- I. nigrilobata (Alexander, 1957)
- I. nigroterminalis (Alexander, 1973)
- I. octavia (Alexander, 1938)
- I. octoapiculata (Savchenko, 1972)
- I. omanensis Hancock, 1997
- I. ornatula (Lackschewitz, 1964)
- I. orthophallus (Alexander, 1975)
- I. paleuma (Alexander, 1962)
- I. pallens (Alexander, 1928)
- I. peninsularis (Edwards, 1928)
- I. pergracilis (Alexander, 1957)
- I. perpallens (Alexander, 1938)
- I. persimilis (Alexander, 1958)
- I. persimplex (Alexander, 1969)
- I. petilis (Alexander, 1958)
- I. phaeosoma (Alexander, 1957)
- I. phallostena (Alexander, 1957)
- I. proserpina (Alexander, 1943)
- I. proxima (Brunetti, 1912)
- I. pruinosa (Alexander, 1920)
- I. przewalskii (Lackschewitz, 1964)
- I. pulchripennis (Loew, 1856)
- I. punctata (Edwards, 1938)
- I. punctipennis (Edwards, 1926)
- I. recens (Alexander, 1950)
- I. recurvinervis (Bergroth, 1913)
- I. sachalinensis (Alexander, 1924)
- I. sanaanensis Hancock, 2006
- I. sarobiensis (Nielsen, 1961)
- I. satanas (Alexander, 1959)
- I. schrenkii (Mik, 1889)
- I. sedata (Alexander, 1970)
- I. serratistyla (Alexander, 1968)
- I. serrulifera (Alexander, 1957)
- I. sexdentata (Nielsen, 1963)
- I. sexguttata (Dale, 1842)
- I. shannoni (Alexander, 1926)
- I. shantungensis (Alexander, 1930)
- I. sita (Alexander, 1968)
- I. sperryana (Alexander, 1948)
- I. spinulistyla (Alexander, 1975)
- I. spuria (Bergroth, 1888)
- I. stenophallus (Alexander, 1958)
- I. subpruinosa (Alexander, 1924)
- I. subspuria (Alexander, 1948)
- I. sziladyi (Lackschewitz, 1940)
- I. teranishii (Alexander, 1921)
- I. terribilis (Alexander, 1968)
- I. thaiicola (Alexander, 1953)
- I. theowaldi Savchenko, 1982
- I. thomassetiana (Alexander, 1948)
- I. tuckeri (Alexander, 1921)
- I. vayu (Alexander, 1968)
- I. xenopyga (Alexander, 1964)
