= Gymnastes =

Scientific classification
- Kingdom: Animalia
- Phylum: Arthropoda
- Class: Insecta
- Order: Diptera
- Family: Limoniidae
- Subfamily: Chioneinae
- Genus: Gymnastes; Brunetti, 1911

Type species
- Gymnastes violaceus Brunetti, 1911

Subgenera
- Gymnastes Brunetti, 1911; Neogymnastes Alexander, 1971; Paragymnastes Alexander, 1922

Genus of flies

Gymnastes is a genus of crane fly in the family Limoniidae.

== Species ==
- Subgenus Gymnastes Brunetti, 1911

- G. anticaniger Alexander, 1967
- G. dilatipes Alexander, 1956
- G. hyalipennis (Alexander, 1920)
- G. latifuscus Alexander, 1967
- G. omeicola Alexander, 1935
- G. ornatipennis (de Meijere, 1911)
- G. shirakii (Alexander, 1920)
- G. subnudus Alexander, 1956
- G. teucholaboides (Alexander, 1920)
- G. tridens Alexander, 1967
- G. violaceus Brunetti, 1911

- Subgenus Neogymnastes Alexander, 1971

- G. perexquisitus Alexander, 1938

- Subgenus Paragymnastes Alexander, 1922

- G. berumbanensis Edwards, 1928
- G. bistriatipennis Brunetti, 1918
- G. catagraphus Alexander, 1929
- G. clitellarius Alexander, 1937
- G. comes Alexander, 1966
- G. cyanoceps (Alexander, 1922)
- G. dasycerus Alexander, 1948
- G. demeijerei (Riedel, 1921)
- G. fascipennis (Thomson, 1869)
- G. flavitibia (Alexander, 1919)
- G. fulvogenualis Alexander, 1937
- G. gloria (Alexander, 1921)
- G. hylaeus Alexander, 1932
- G. imitator Alexander, 1951
- G. kandyanus Alexander, 1958
- G. maya Alexander, 1958
- G. mckeani Alexander, 1935
- G. multicinctus Edwards, 1931
- G. nigripes (Alexander, 1922)
- G. nigripes Edwards, 1928
- G. niveipes Alexander, 1948
- G. pennipes Brunetti, 1918
- G. pictipennis Edwards, 1916
- G. riedeli (Alexander, 1931)
- G. simhalae Alexander, 1958
