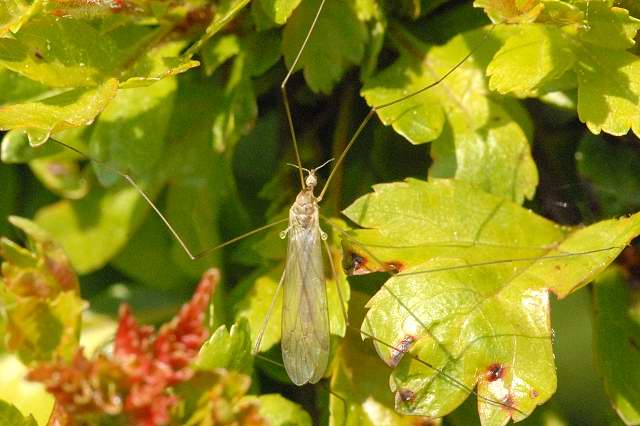
- Ormosia nodulosa

Scientific classification
- Domain: Eukaryota
- Kingdom: Animalia
- Phylum: Arthropoda
- Class: Insecta
- Order: Diptera
- Family: Limoniidae
- Subfamily: Chioneinae
- Tribe: Eriopterini
- Genus: Ormosia; Rondani, 1856

Type species
- Erioptera nodulosa Macquart, 1826

Subgenera
- Neserioptera Alexander, 1956; Oreophila Lackschewitz, 1935; Ormosia Rondani, 1856; Parormosia Alexander, 1965

Synonyms
- Ilisomyia Rondani, 1856

= Ormosia (fly) =

Genus of flies

Ormosia is a genus of crane flies in the family Limoniidae.

== Species ==
- Subgenus Neserioptera Alexander, 1956

- O. perpusilla Edwards, 1912

- Subgenus Oreophila Lackschewitz, 1935

- O. absaroka Alexander, 1943
- O. bergrothi (Strobl, 1895)
- O. bucera Alexander, 1954
- O. confluenta Alexander, 1922
- O. flaveola (Coquillett, 1900)
- O. hutchinsonae Alexander, 1935
- O. leptorhabda Alexander, 1943
- O. licina Alexander, 1966
- O. longicornis Savchenko, 1980
- O. parviala Petersen & Gelhaus, 2004
- O. sequoiarum Alexander, 1945
- O. sootryeni (Lackschewitz, 1935)
- O. stenostyla Alexander, 1965
- O. subducalis Alexander, 1940
- O. triangularis Alexander, 1949
- O. weymarni Alexander, 1950
- O. yankovskyi Alexander, 1940

- Subgenus Ormosia Rondani, 1856

- O. aciculata Edwards, 1921
- O. aculeata Alexander, 1924
- O. adirondacensis Alexander, 1919
- O. affinis (Lundbeck, 1898)
- O. affixa Alexander, 1936
- O. albertensis Alexander, 1933
- O. albitibia Edwards, 1921
- O. albrighti Alexander, 1954
- O. alexanderi Savchenko, 1976
- O. amakazarii Alexander, 1958
- O. amicorum Savchenko & Tomov, 1975
- O. anthracopoda Alexander, 1930
- O. arcuata (Doane, 1908)
- O. arisanensis Alexander, 1924
- O. arnaudi Alexander, 1966
- O. auricosta Alexander, 1933
- O. autumna Savchenko, 1976
- O. baldensis Mendl, 1974
- O. beatifica Alexander, 1938
- O. biannulata Alexander, 1936
- O. bicornis (de Meijere, 1920)
- O. bifida (Lackschewitz, 1940)
- O. bigladia Alexander, 1966
- O. bihamata Lackschewitz, 1935
- O. bilineata Dietz, 1916
- O. brachyrhabda Alexander, 1948
- O. brevicalcarata Alexander, 1927
- O. brevinervis (Lundstrom, 1907)
- O. broweri Alexander, 1939
- O. burneyana Alexander, 1964
- O. burneyensis Alexander, 1950
- O. carolinensis Alexander, 1925
- O. caucasica Savchenko, 1973
- O. cerrita Alexander, 1949
- O. clavata (Tonnoir, 1920)
- O. cockerelli (Coquillett, 1901)
- O. cornuta (Doane, 1908)
- O. cornutoides Alexander, 1940
- O. croatica Stary, 1971
- O. curvata Alexander, 1924
- O. curvicornis Alexander, 1966
- O. curvispina Alexander, 1936
- O. cuspidata Savchenko, 1973
- O. davisi Alexander, 1954
- O. decorata Alexander, 1940
- O. decussata Alexander, 1924
- O. dedita Alexander, 1943
- O. defessa Alexander, 1938
- O. defrenata Alexander, 1948
- O. denningi Alexander, 1976
- O. dentifera Alexander, 1919
- O. depilata Edwards, 1938
- O. dicax Alexander, 1947
- O. dicera Alexander, 1966
- O. diplotergata Alexander, 1928
- O. diversipennis Alexander, 1935
- O. echigoensis Alexander, 1957
- O. egena (Bergroth, 1891)
- O. fascipennis (Zetterstedt, 1838)
- O. fernaldi Alexander, 1924
- O. filifera (Lackschewitz, 1940)
- O. fixa Alexander, 1936
- O. flavida Savchenko, 1973
- O. formosana Edwards, 1921
- O. fragmentata Alexander, 1940
- O. frisoni Alexander, 1920
- O. fugitiva Alexander, 1935
- O. furcata Savchenko, 1973
- O. furcivena Alexander, 1968
- O. furibunda Alexander, 1954
- O. geniculata (Brunetti, 1912)
- O. gerronis Alexander, 1954
- O. grahami Alexander, 1931
- O. hallahani Alexander, 1943
- O. harrisoniana Alexander, 1940
- O. harsha Alexander, 1965
- O. hartigi Mendl, 1973
- O. hederae (Curtis, 1835)
- O. helifera Savchenko, 1978
- O. heptacantha Alexander, 1949
- O. hispa Alexander, 1945
- O. holotricha (Osten Sacken, 1860)
- O. horiana Alexander, 1924
- O. hubbelli Alexander, 1926
- O. hynesi Alexander, 1962
- O. idioneura Alexander, 1952
- O. idioneurodes Alexander, 1968
- O. idiostyla Alexander, 1968
- O. inaequispina Alexander, 1940
- O. inaperta Savchenko, 1976
- O. inflexa Savchenko, 1973
- O. ingloria Alexander, 1929
- O. insolita Alexander, 1938
- O. ithacana Alexander, 1929
- O. kamikochiae Alexander, 1947
- O. kashmiri Alexander, 1965
- O. lackschewitzi Bangerter, 1947
- O. laevistyla Alexander, 1933
- O. lanuginosa (Doane, 1900)
- O. legata Alexander, 1949
- O. levanidovae Savchenko, 1983
- O. lilliana Alexander, 1940
- O. lineata (Meigen, 1804)
- O. longicorna (Doane, 1908)
- O. longispina Savchenko, 1983
- O. loretta Alexander, 1976
- O. lotida Savchenko, 1973
- O. loxia Stary, 1983
- O. machidana Alexander, 1933
- O. megacera Alexander, 1917
- O. meigenii (Osten Sacken, 1860)
- O. mesocera Alexander, 1917
- O. microstyla Savchenko, 1973
- O. mitchellensis Alexander, 1941
- O. moghalensis Alexander, 1965
- O. monticola (Osten Sacken, 1869)
- O. moravica Stary, 1969
- O. multidentata Savchenko, 1973
- O. nantaisana Alexander, 1921
- O. neidioneura Alexander, 1973
- O. neopulchra Alexander, 1968
- O. nimbipennis Alexander, 1917
- O. nobilis Alexander, 1964
- O. nodulosa (Macquart, 1826)
- O. nonacantha Alexander, 1954
- O. notmani Alexander, 1920
- O. nyctopoda Alexander, 1965
- O. officiosa Alexander, 1936
- O. onerosa Alexander, 1943
- O. opifex Alexander, 1943
- O. orientobifida Savchenko, 1983
- O. paxilla Alexander, 1957
- O. pernodosa Alexander, 1950
- O. perplexa Dietz, 1916
- O. perspectabilis Alexander, 1945
- O. pirinensis Stary, 1971
- O. pleuracantha Alexander, 1954
- O. praecisa Alexander, 1932
- O. profesta Alexander, 1936
- O. profunda Alexander, 1943
- O. proxima Alexander, 1924
- O. pseudosimilis (Lundstrom, 1912)
- O. pugetensis Alexander, 1946
- O. pulchra (Brunetti, 1912)
- O. rectangularis Alexander, 1934
- O. remissa Alexander, 1953
- O. rhaphidis Alexander, 1965
- O. romanovichiana Alexander, 1953
- O. rostrifera Savchenko, 1973
- O. rubella (Osten Sacken, 1869)
- O. ruficauda (Zetterstedt, 1838)
- O. seclusa Alexander, 1936
- O. sentis Alexander, 1943
- O. serrata Savchenko, 1973
- O. serridens Alexander, 1919
- O. setaxilla Alexander, 1965
- O. shoreana Alexander, 1929
- O. solita Alexander, 1936
- O. spinifex Alexander, 1943
- O. staegeriana Alexander, 1953
- O. subalpina Alexander, 1947
- O. subcornuta Alexander, 1920
- O. subdentifera Alexander, 1941
- O. subfascipennis Savchenko, 1973
- O. subnubila Alexander, 1920
- O. subpulchra Alexander, 1966
- O. subserrata Savchenko, 1976
- O. taeniocera Dietz, 1916
- O. tahoensis Alexander, 1950
- O. takahashii Alexander, 1919
- O. takeuchii Alexander, 1921
- O. tennesseensis Alexander, 1940
- O. tenuispinosa Alexander, 1936
- O. tokionis Alexander, 1919
- O. tokunagai Alexander, 1932
- O. townesi Alexander, 1933
- O. tricornis Alexander, 1949
- O. umbripennis Alexander, 1966
- O. unicornis Alexander, 1954
- O. upsilon Alexander, 1947
- O. uralensis Lackschewitz, 1964
- O. zebrina Alexander, 1952

- Subgenus Parormosia Alexander, 1965

- O. angustaurata Alexander, 1936
- O. atrotibialis Alexander, 1966
- O. discalba Alexander, 1952
- O. divergens (Coquillett, 1905)
- O. diversipes Alexander, 1919
- O. frohnearum Alexander, 1968
- O. funeralis Alexander, 1952
- O. fusiformis fusiformis (Doane, 1900)
- O. fusiformis viduata Alexander, 1941
- O. gaspensis Alexander, 1929
- O. lataurata Alexander, 1936
- O. leucoplagia Alexander, 1965
- O. leucostictula Alexander, 1965
- O. luteola Dietz, 1916
- O. mahabharatae Alexander, 1965
- O. nigripennis Alexander, 1936
- O. nigripila (Osten Sacken, 1869)
- O. nippoalpina Alexander, 1941
- O. palpalis Dietz, 1916
- O. peramata Alexander, 1965
- O. perdiffusa Alexander, 1965
- O. pygmaea (Alexander, 1912)
- O. saturnina Alexander, 1972
