= Baeoura =

Scientific classification
- Kingdom: Animalia
- Phylum: Arthropoda
- Class: Insecta
- Order: Diptera
- Family: Limoniidae
- Subfamily: Chioneinae
- Genus: Baeoura; Alexander, 1924

Type species
- Erioptera nigrolatera Alexander, 1920

Genus of flies

Baeoura is a genus of crane fly in the family Limoniidae.

== Species ==
- B. acustyla Alexander, 1964
- B. advena (Alexander, 1928)
- B. afghanica (Alexander, 1955)
- B. aka Alexander, 1969
- B. alexanderi Mendl & Tjeder, 1974
- B. aliena (Alexander, 1924)
- B. angustilobata (Alexander, 1937)
- B. angustisterna Alexander, 1966
- B. armata Mendl, 1985
- B. bilobula Alexander, 1966
- B. bistela Alexander, 1966
- B. brevipilosa (Alexander, 1920)
- B. brumata (Wood, 1952)
- B. claripennis (Alexander, 1921)
- B. coloneura Alexander, 1964
- B. consocia (Alexander, 1935)
- B. consona (Alexander, 1936)
- B. convoluta (Alexander, 1931)
- B. cooksoni (Alexander, 1958)
- B. dicladura (Alexander, 1936)
- B. dihybosa Alexander, 1964
- B. directa (Kuntze, 1914)
- B. distans (Brunetti, 1912)
- B. ebenina Stary, 1981
- B. funebris (Alexander, 1927)
- B. furcella Alexander, 1964
- B. hemmingseni Alexander, 1978
- B. inaequiarmata (Alexander, 1953)
- B. irula Alexander, 1966
- B. laevilobata (Alexander, 1935)
- B. latibasis Alexander, 1969
- B. longefiligera Mendl, 1986
- B. longicalcarata (Wood, 1952)
- B. longiloba Alexander, 1966
- B. malickyi Mendl & Tjeder, 1976
- B. mediofiligera Savchenko, 1984
- B. naga Alexander, 1966
- B. nigeriana Alexander, 1972
- B. nigrolatera (Alexander, 1920)
- B. nigromedia Edwards, 1927
- B. nilgiriana (Alexander, 1951)
- B. obtusistyla Alexander, 1969
- B. palmulata Alexander, 1966
- B. perductilis (Alexander, 1938)
- B. pilifera Edwards, 1927
- B. platystyla Alexander, 1966
- B. pollicis (Alexander, 1958)
- B. primaeva (Alexander, 1957)
- B. producticornis (Alexander, 1960)
- B. pubera (Edwards, 1933)
- B. schachti Mendl, 1986
- B. schmidiana Alexander, 1964
- B. semicincta (Alexander, 1925)
- B. septentrionalis (Alexander, 1940)
- B. setosipes (Alexander, 1936)
- B. sternata Alexander, 1964
- B. sternofurca Alexander, 1964
- B. subnebula (Alexander, 1960)
- B. szadziewskii Krzeminski & Stary, 1984
- B. taprobanes Alexander, 1966
- B. tasmanica (Alexander, 1926)
- B. tonnoiri (Alexander, 1926)
- B. tricalcarata Alexander, 1966
- B. trichopoda (Alexander, 1930)
- B. trihastata (Alexander, 1949)
- B. triquetra (Alexander, 1958)
- B. trisimilis Alexander, 1966
- B. unistylata (Alexander, 1949)
- B. witzenbergi (Wood, 1952)
