= Dasymallomyia =

Scientific classification
- Kingdom: Animalia
- Phylum: Arthropoda
- Clade: Pancrustacea
- Class: Insecta
- Order: Diptera
- Family: Limoniidae
- Subfamily: Chioneinae
- Genus: Dasymallomyia; Brunetti, 1911

Type species
- D. signata Brunetti, 1911

Species
- See text

Genus of flies

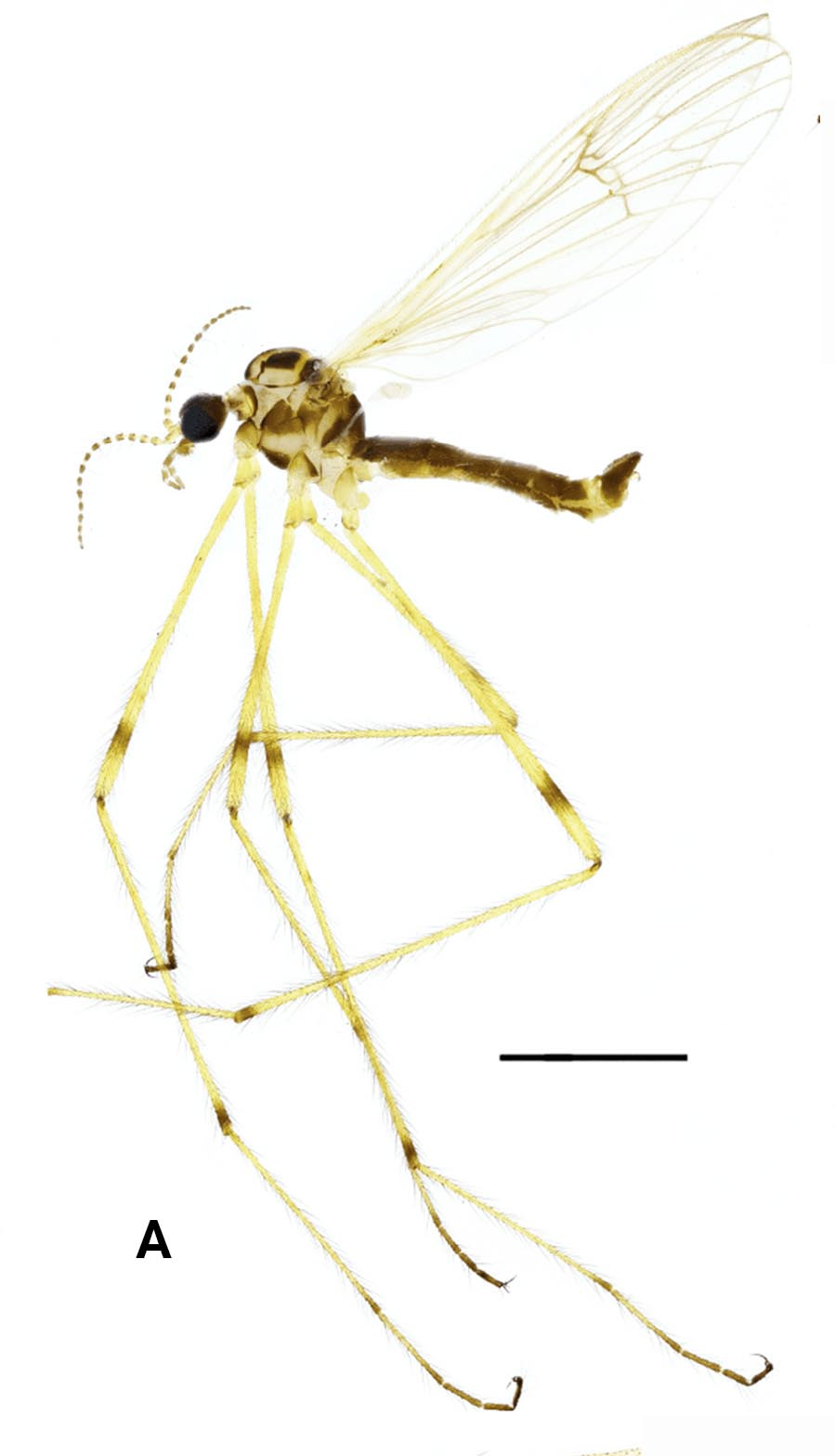
Dasymallomyia dentata

Dasymallomyia is a genus of crane fly in the family Limoniidae.

== Species ==
- D. clausa Alexander, 1940
- D. compacta Alexander, 1964
- D. ditenostyla Alexander, 1964
- D. klapperichi Alexander, 1955
- D. mecophallus Alexander, 1964
- D. persignata Alexander, 1932
- D. signata Brunetti, 1911
- D. tanyphallus Alexander, 1964
