= Quathlambia =

Scientific classification
- Kingdom: Animalia
- Phylum: Arthropoda
- Class: Insecta
- Order: Diptera
- Family: Limoniidae
- Subfamily: Chioneinae
- Genus: Quathlambia; Alexander, 1956

Type species
- Quathlambia stuckenbergi Alexander, 1956

Species
- see text

Genus of flies

Quathlambia is a genus of crane flies in the family Limoniidae.

== Distribution ==
South Africa.

== Species ==
- Q. stuckenbergi Alexander, 1956
