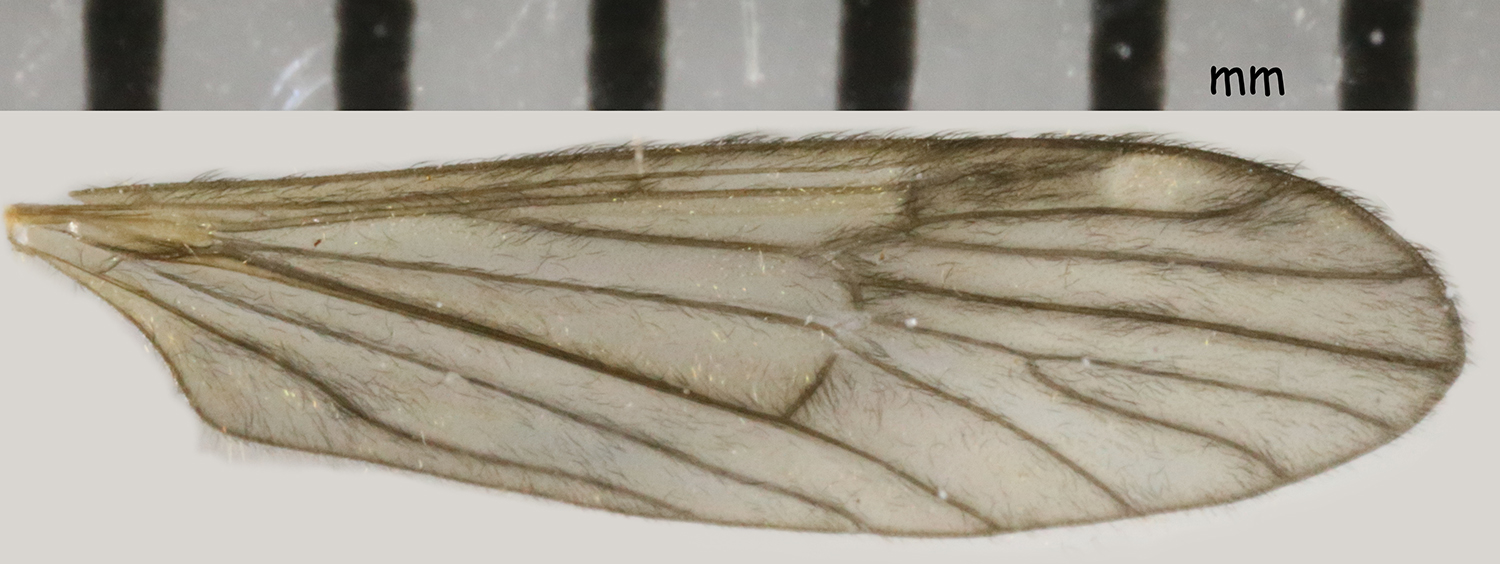
- Rhypholophus varius Wing

Scientific classification
- Kingdom: Animalia
- Phylum: Arthropoda
- Clade: Pancrustacea
- Class: Insecta
- Order: Diptera
- Family: Limoniidae
- Genus: Rhypholophus
- Species: R. varius

Binomial name
- Rhypholophus varius (Meigen, 1818)

= Rhypholophus varius =

Species of fly

Rhypholophus varius is a Palearctic species of craneflies in the family Limoniidae. It is found in a wide range of habitats and micro habitats: in earth rich in humus, in swamps and marshes, in leaf litter and in wet spots in woods.
