= Scleroprocta =

Scientific classification
- Kingdom: Animalia
- Phylum: Arthropoda
- Class: Insecta
- Order: Diptera
- Family: Limoniidae
- Subfamily: Chioneinae
- Genus: Scleroprocta; Edwards, 1938

Type species
- Ormosia danica Nielsen, 1923 [= sororcula (Zetterstedt, 1851)]

Species
- see text

Genus of flies

Scleroprocta is a genus of crane fly in the family Limoniidae.

== Distribution ==
North America, Europe & Asia.

== Species ==
- S. acifurca Savchenko, 1979
- S. apicalis (Alexander, 1911)
- S. balcanica Stary, 1976
- S. cinctifer (Alexander, 1919)
- S. hexacantha (Alexander, 1970)
- S. innocens (Osten Sacken, 1869)
- S. krzeminskii Stary, 2008
- S. latiprocta Savchenko, 1973
- S. oosterbroeki Stary, 2008
- S. pentagonalis (Loew, 1873)
- S. slaviki Stary, 2008
- S. sororcula (Zetterstedt, 1851)
- S. tetonica (Alexander, 1945)
