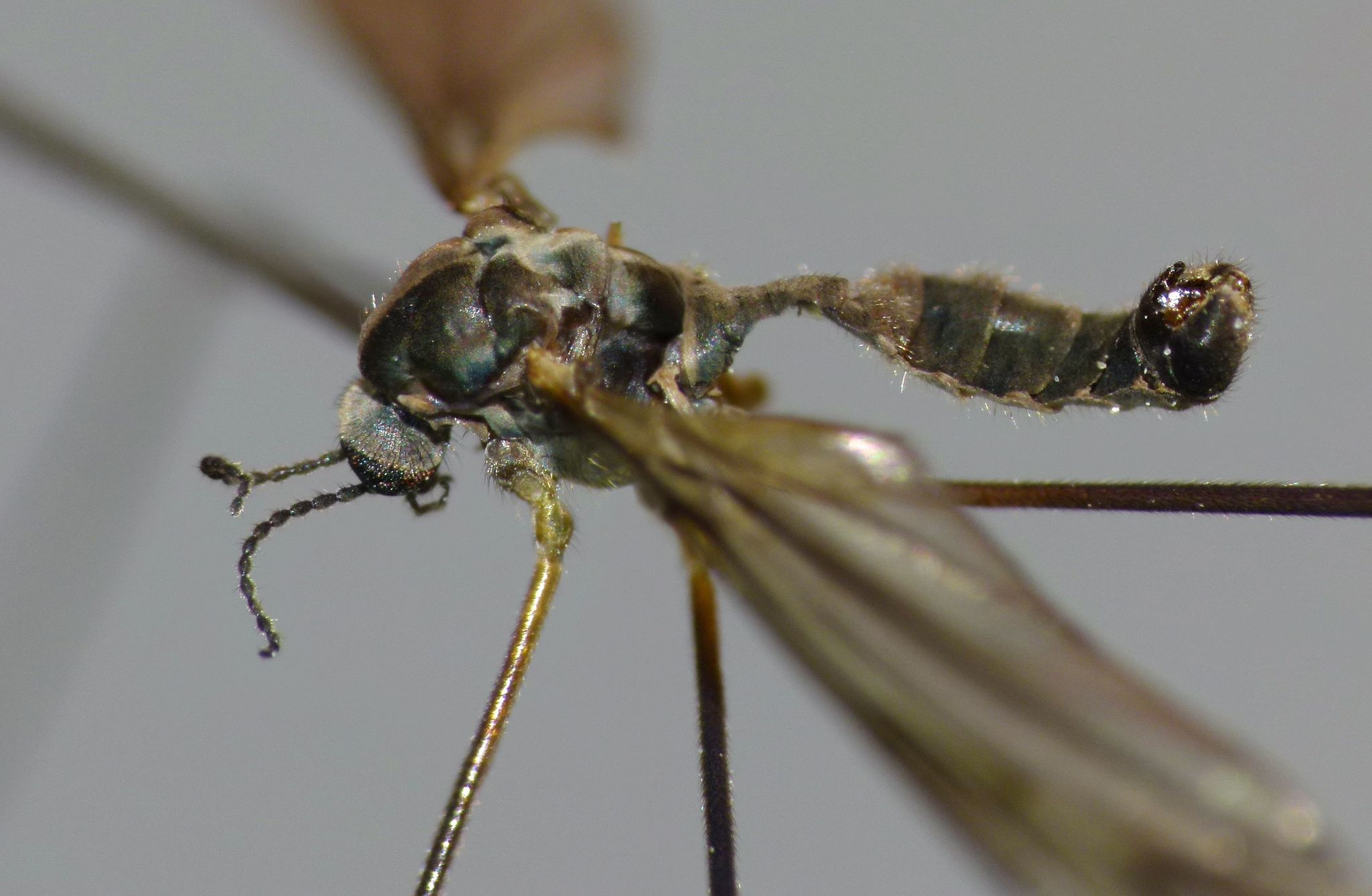
- Aphrophila neozelandica

Scientific classification
- Domain: Eukaryota
- Kingdom: Animalia
- Phylum: Arthropoda
- Class: Insecta
- Order: Diptera
- Family: Limoniidae
- Subfamily: Chioneinae
- Genus: Aphrophila; Edwards, 1923

Type species
- Gnophomyia neozelandica Edwards, 1923

= Aphrophila =

Genus of flies

Aphrophila is a genus of crane flies in the family Limoniidae.

== Species ==
The following species are recognised in the genus Aphrophila:

- A. aequalitas Santos and Ribeiro, 2018
- A. alexanderi Santos and Ribeiro, 2018
- A. amblydonta Alexander, 1971
- A. antennata Alexander, 1953
- A. aurantiaca Alexander, 1944
- A. argentina Santos and Ribeiro, 2018
- A. bidentata Alexander, 1968
- A. carbonaria Alexander, 1931
- A. chilena Alexander, 1928
- A. coronata Alexander, 1944
- A. dentata Santos and Ribeiro, 2018
- A. dupla Santos and Ribeiro, 2018
- A. edwardsi Santos and Ribeiro, 2018
- A. flavopygialis (Alexander, 1922)
- A. huahua Santos and Ribeiro, 2018
- A. luteipes Alexander, 1926
- A. minuscula Santos and Ribeiro, 2018
- A. monacantha Alexander, 1926
- A. multidentata Alexander, 1931
- A. neozelandica (Edwards, 1923)
- A. penta Santos and Ribeiro, 2018
- A. peuma Santos and Ribeiro, 2018
- A. regia Santos and Ribeiro, 2018
- A. serra Santos and Ribeiro, 2018
- A. sperancae Santos and Ribeiro, 2018
- A. subterminalis Alexander, 1967
- A. tridentata Alexander, 1926
- A. trifida Alexander, 1926
- A. triton (Alexander, 1922)
- A. viridinervis Alexander, 1934
- A. vittipennis Alexander, 1925
- A. vulcania Santos and Ribeiro, 2018
- A. whakapapa Santos and Ribeiro, 2018
