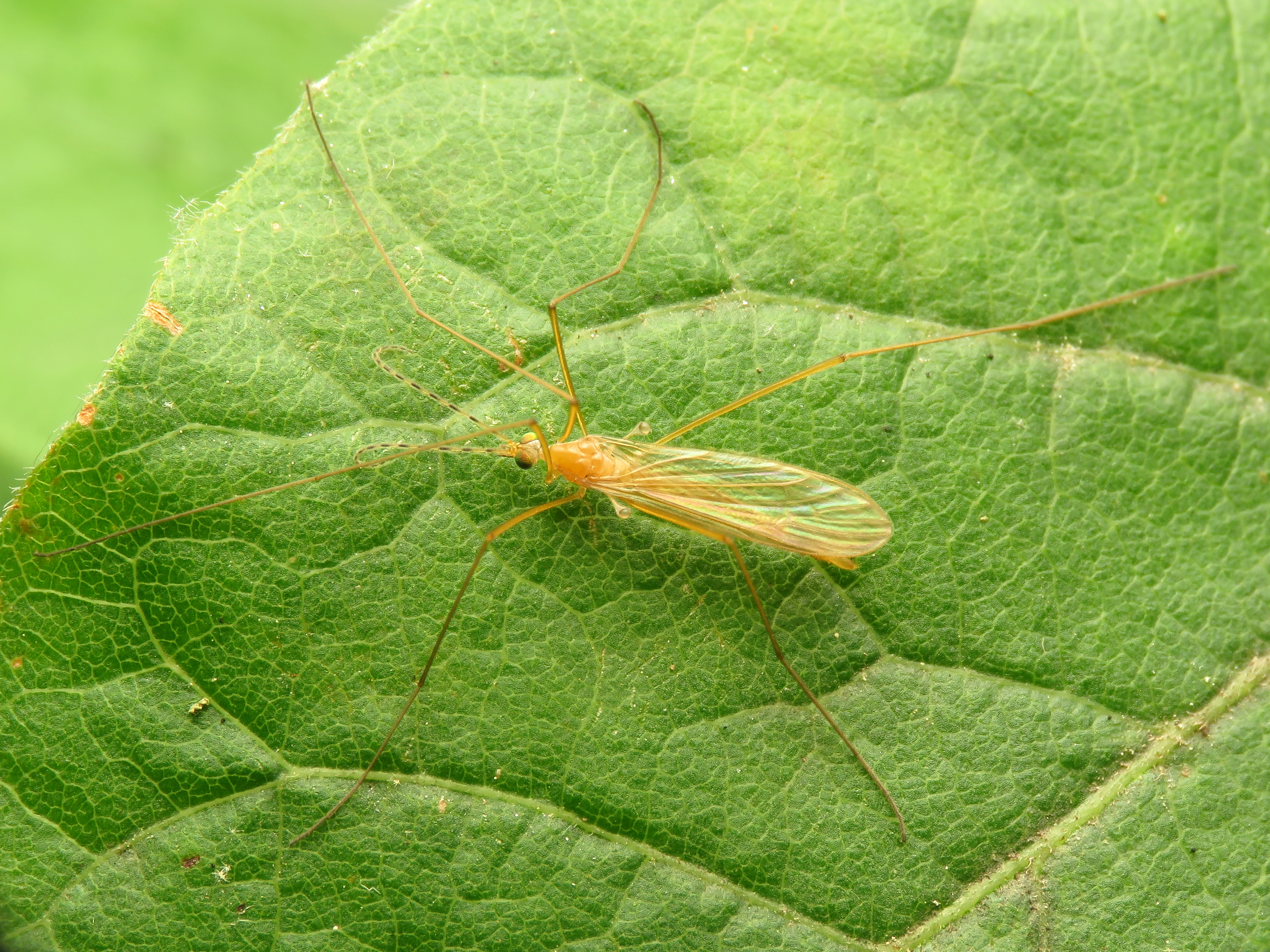

Scientific classification
- Domain: Eukaryota
- Kingdom: Animalia
- Phylum: Arthropoda
- Class: Insecta
- Order: Diptera
- Family: Limoniidae
- Genus: Atarba
- Species: A. picticornis

Binomial name
- Atarba picticornis Osten Sacken, 1869

= Atarba picticornis =

Species of fly

Atarba picticornis is a species of limoniid crane fly in the family Limoniidae.
