= Unguicrypteria =

Scientific classification
- Kingdom: Animalia
- Phylum: Arthropoda
- Class: Insecta
- Order: Diptera
- Family: Limoniidae
- Subfamily: Chioneinae
- Genus: Unguicrypteria; Alexander, 1981

Type species
- Limnophila ctenonycha Alexander, 1929

Species
- see text

Genus of flies

Unguicrypteria is a genus of crane fly in the family Limoniidae.

== Distribution ==
Argentina & Chile.

== Species ==
- U. ctenonycha Alexander, 1929
