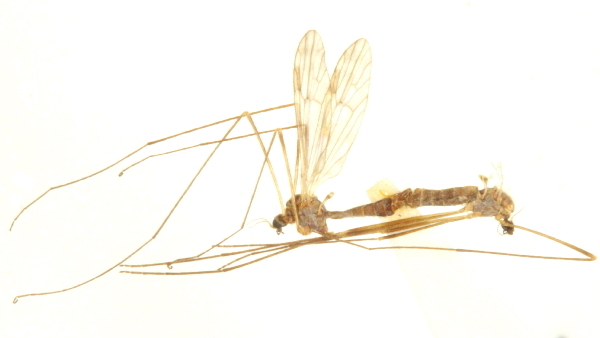

Scientific classification
- Kingdom: Animalia
- Phylum: Arthropoda
- Class: Insecta
- Order: Diptera
- Family: Limoniidae
- Genus: Ormosia
- Species: O. romanovichiana

Binomial name
- Ormosia romanovichiana Alexander, 1953

Synonyms
- Erioptera nubila Osten Sacken, 1859

= Ormosia romanovichiana =

Species of fly

Ormosia romanovichiana is a species of limoniid crane fly in the family Limoniidae.
