= Neognophomyia =

Scientific classification
- Kingdom: Animalia
- Phylum: Arthropoda
- Class: Insecta
- Order: Diptera
- Family: Limoniidae
- Subfamily: Chioneinae
- Genus: Neognophomyia; Alexander, 1926

Type species
- Gnophomyia immaculipennis Alexander, 1926

Species
- see text

Genus of flies

Neognophomyia is a genus of crane fly in the family Limoniidae.

== Distribution ==
South & Central America

== Species ==
- N. adara Alexander, 1949
- N. bisecta (Alexander, 1920)
- N. bisetosa Alexander, 1944
- N. citripes Alexander, 1945
- N. cochlearis Alexander, 1945
- N. colombicola Alexander, 1931
- N. consociata Alexander, 1942
- N. crassistyla Alexander, 1967
- N. cuzcoensis Alexander, 1967
- N. debilitata Alexander, 1949
- N. heliconiae Alexander, 1945
- N. hirsuta (Alexander, 1913)
- N. hostica Alexander, 1943
- N. immaculipennis (Alexander, 1926)
- N. interrupta Alexander, 1944
- N. latifascia (Alexander, 1926)
- N. monophora Alexander, 1941
- N. obtusilamina Alexander, 1952
- N. panamensis Alexander, 1930
- N. paprzyckiana Alexander, 1944
- N. pervicax (Alexander, 1914)
- N. pinckerti Alexander, 1962
- N. productissima Alexander, 1944
- N. scapha Alexander, 1945
- N. scaphoides Alexander, 1952
- N. schildi Alexander, 1945
- N. setilobata Alexander, 1949
- N. sparsiseta Alexander, 1945
- N. spectralis Alexander, 1944
- N. trinitatis Alexander, 1927
