= Eugnophomyia =

Scientific classification
- Kingdom: Animalia
- Phylum: Arthropoda
- Clade: Pancrustacea
- Class: Insecta
- Order: Diptera
- Family: Limoniidae
- Subfamily: Chioneinae
- Genus: Eugnophomyia; Alexander, 1947

Type species
- Gnophomyia luctuosa Osten Sacken, 1860

Species
- See text

Genus of flies

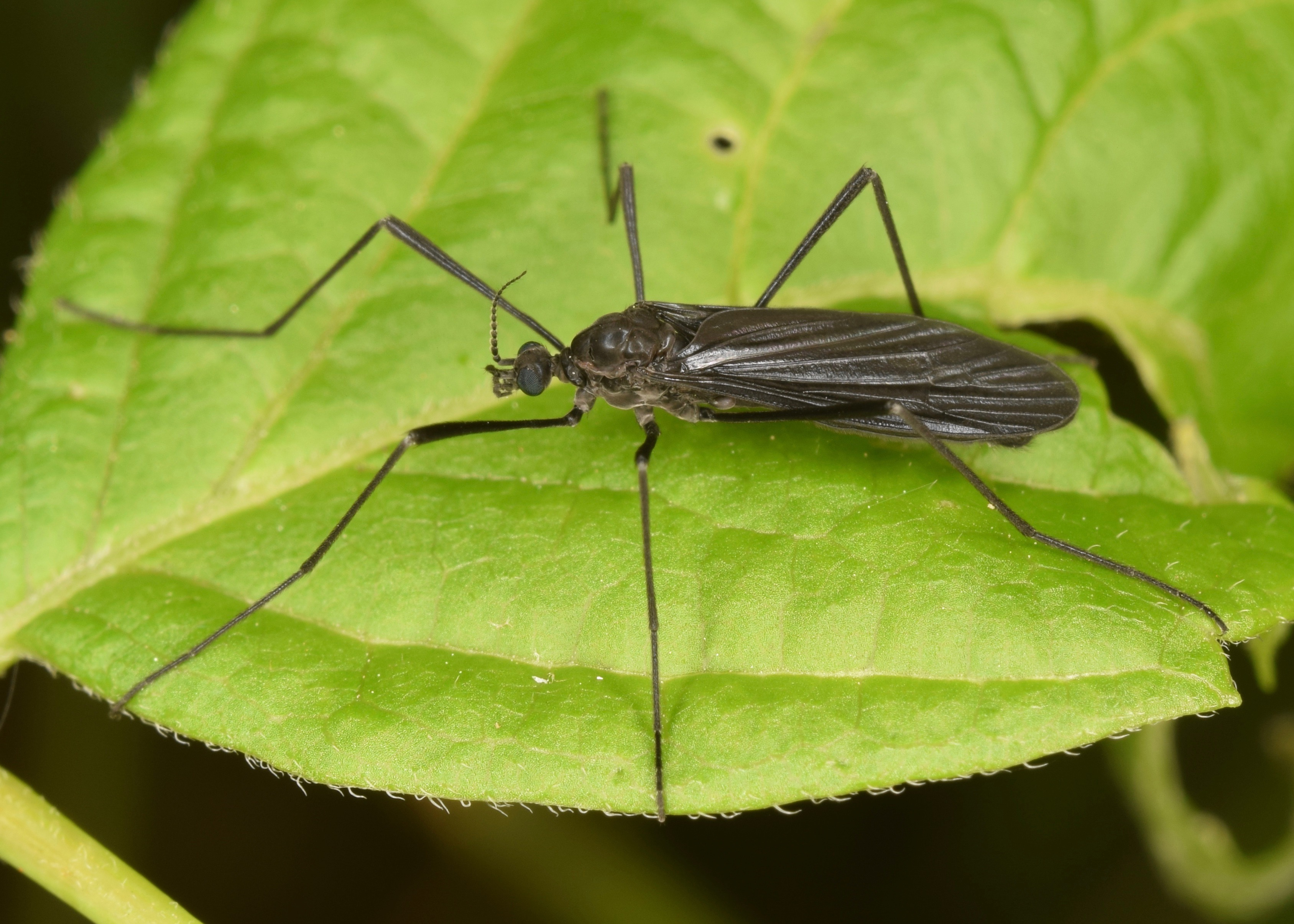
Eugnophomyia luctuosa, Georgia, USA

Eugnophomyia is a genus of crane fly in the family Limoniidae.

== Species ==
- E. apache (Alexander, 1946)
- E. azrael (Alexander, 1943)
- E. chirindensis (Alexander, 1930)
- E. curraniana (Alexander, 1945)
- E. darlingtoni (Alexander, 1937)
- E. elegans (Wiedemann, 1830)
- E. excordis (Alexander, 1951)
- E. flagrans (Alexander, 1929)
- E. flammeithorax (Alexander, 1949)
- E. funebris (Alexander, 1922)
- E. funerea (Alexander, 1938)
- E. fuscocostata (Alexander, 1959)
- E. glabripennis (Alexander, 1948)
- E. golbachi (Alexander, 1962)
- E. incurvata Alexander, 1971
- E. juniniana (Alexander, 1951)
- E. leucoplaca (Alexander, 1921)
- E. luctuosa (Osten Sacken, 1860)
- E. melancholica (Alexander, 1922)
- E. pammelas (Alexander, 1922)
- E. peramoena (Alexander, 1920)
- E. perelegans (Alexander, 1920)
- E. perlaeta (Alexander, 1958)
- E. posticata (Alexander, 1939)
- E. preclara (Alexander, 1960)
- E. silindicola (Alexander, 1948)
- E. stuckenbergiana Alexander, 1976
- E. tempestiva (Alexander, 1943)
- E. turneri (Alexander, 1930)
- E. vivasberthieri (Alexander, 1944)
