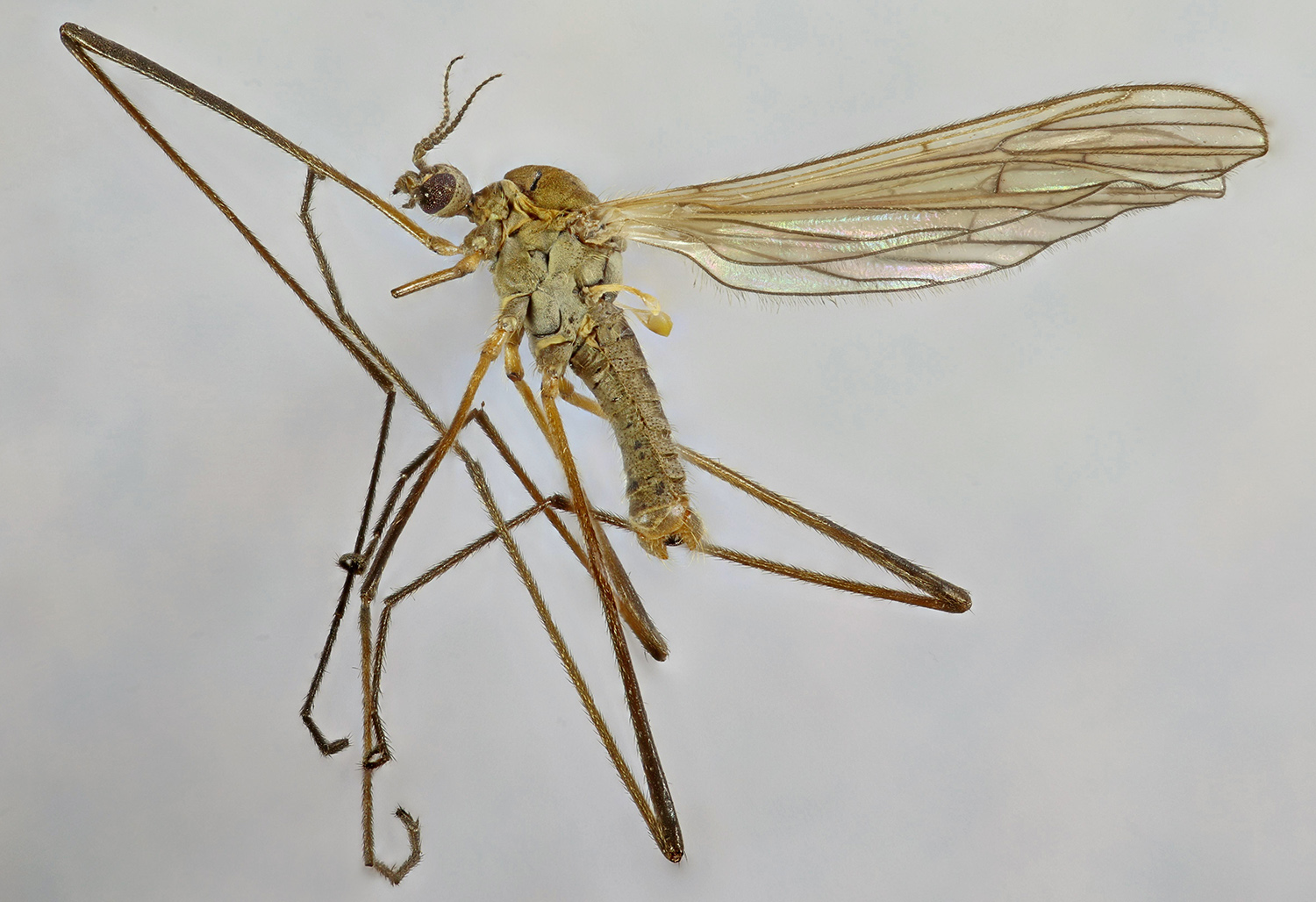
- Erioconopa trivialis

Scientific classification
- Kingdom: Animalia
- Phylum: Arthropoda
- Class: Insecta
- Order: Diptera
- Family: Limoniidae
- Subfamily: Chioneinae
- Tribe: Molophilini
- Genus: Erioconopa; Stary, 1976

Type species
- Erioptera trivialis Meigen, 1818

Species
- See text

= Erioconopa =

Genus of flies

Erioconopa is a genus of crane fly in the family Limoniidae.

== Distribution ==
It is found within the Palearctic realm.

== Species ==
- Erioconopa diuturna (Walker, 1848)
- Erioconopa elegantula (Alexander, 1913)
- Erioconopa harukawai (Alexander, 1926)
- Erioconopa interposita Stary, 1976
- Erioconopa symplectoides (Kuntze, 1914)
- Erioconopa tadzika (Savchenko, 1972)
- Erioconopa trivialis (Meigen, 1818)
