= Hoplolabis =

Scientific classification
- Kingdom: Animalia
- Phylum: Arthropoda
- Class: Insecta
- Order: Diptera
- Family: Limoniidae
- Subfamily: Chioneinae
- Genus: Hoplolabis; Osten Sacken, 1869

Type species
- Erioptera armata Osten Sacken, 1860

Subgenera
- Hoplolabis Osten Sacken, 1869; Lunaria Savchenko, 1982; Parilisia Savchenko, 1976

Genus of flies

Hoplolabis is a genus of crane fly in the family Limoniidae.

== Species ==
- Subgenus Hoplolabis Osten Sacken, 1869

- H. armata (Osten Sacken, 1860)
- H. asiatica (Alexander, 1918)
- H. bipartita (Osten Sacken, 1877)
- H. maria (Alexander, 1948)
- H. rara Devyatkov, 2017

- Subgenus Lunaria Savchenko, 1982 [= Eurasicesa Koçak & Kemal, 2009 ?]

- H. amseliana (Nielsen, 1961)
- H. idiophallus (Savchenko, 1973)

- Subgenus Parilisia Savchenko, 1976

- H. albibasis (Savchenko, 1983)
- H. areolata (Siebke, 1872)
- H. badakhensis (Alexander, 1955)
- H. caudata (Savchenko, 1983)
- H. complicata (Bangerter, 1947)
- H. dichroa (Alexander, 1938)
- H. estella (Alexander, 1955)
- H. fluviatilis (Vaillant, 1970)
- H. forcipula (Savchenko, 1978)
- H. iranica (Alexander, 1973)
- H. latiloba (Savchenko, 1978)
- H. longior Stary, 2006
- H. machidai (Alexander, 1931)
- H. mannheimsi (Mendl, 1974)
- H. margarita (Alexander, 1919)
- H. multiserrata (Alexander, 1957)
- H. obtusiapex (Savchenko, 1982)
- H. obtusirama (Savchenko, 1983)
- H. pontica (Savchenko, 1984)
- H. postrema (Alexander, 1936)
- H. punctigera (Lackschewitz, 1940)
- H. sachalina (Alexander, 1924)
- H. serenicola (Alexander, 1940)
- H. serratofalcata (Savchenko, 1983)
- H. sororcula (Lackschewitz, 1940)
- H. spinosa (Nielsen, 1953)
- H. spinula (Mendl, 1973)
- H. subalpina (Bangerter, 1947)
- H. subareolata (Alexander, 1932)
- H. variegata (Savchenko, 1983)
- H. vicina (Tonnoir, 1920)
- H. yezoana (Alexander, 1924)
