= Neophilippiana =

Scientific classification
- Kingdom: Animalia
- Phylum: Arthropoda
- Class: Insecta
- Order: Diptera
- Family: Limoniidae
- Subfamily: Chioneinae
- Genus: Neophilippiana; Alexander, 1964

Type species
- Philippiana egregia Alexander, 1929

Species
- see text

Genus of flies

Neophilippiana is a genus of crane fly in the family Limoniidae.

== Distribution ==
Argentina & Chile

== Species ==
- N. egregia (Alexander, 1929)
