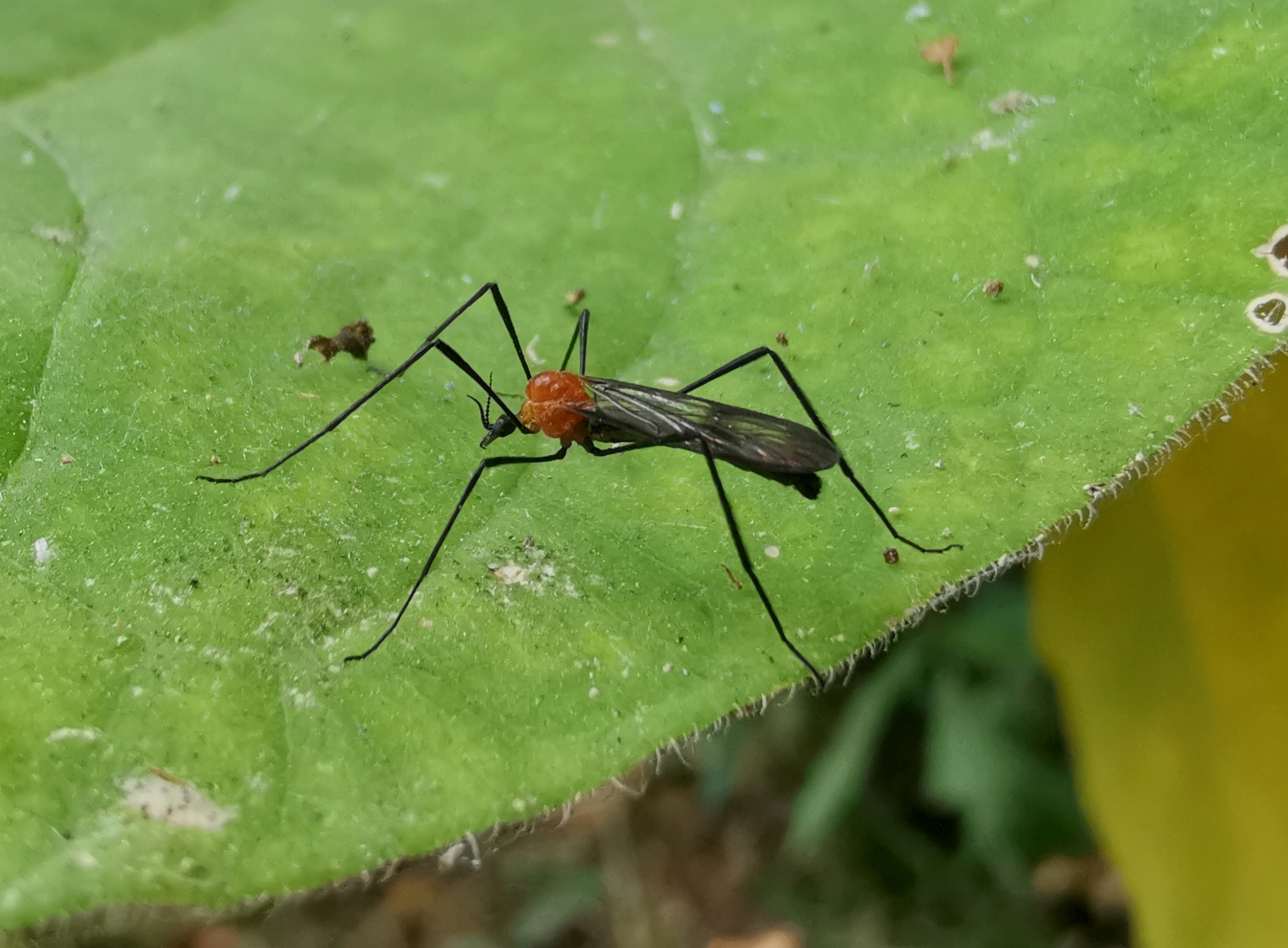
- Teucholabis thurmani

Scientific classification
- Domain: Eukaryota
- Kingdom: Animalia
- Phylum: Arthropoda
- Class: Insecta
- Order: Diptera
- Family: Limoniidae
- Subfamily: Chioneinae
- Genus: Teucholabis; Osten Sacken, 1860

Type species
- Teucholabis complexa Osten Sacken, 1860

Subgenera
- Euparatropesa Alexander, 1947; Euteucholabis Alexander, 1947; Paratropesa Schiner, 1866; Teucholabis Osten Sacken, 1860

= Teucholabis =

Genus of flies

Teucholabis is a genus of crane fly in the family Limoniidae.

== Species ==
- Subgenus Euparatropesa Alexander, 1947

- T. amatrix Alexander
- T. amoena (Alexander, 1922)
- T. angustifascia Alexander, 1968
- T. clavistyla Alexander, 1979
- T. esakii (Alexander, 1924)
- T. fasciolaris (Wiedemann, 1828)
- T. laetabilis Alexander, 1952
- T. heteropoda Alexander, 1943
- T. invenusta Alexander, 1947
- T. jactans (Alexander, 1913)
- T. laetifica Alexander, 1948
- T. lindneri Alexander, 1933
- T. martinezi Alexander, 1962
- T. praenobilis Alexander, 1945
- T. sanguinolenta Alexander, 1938
- T. witteana Alexander, 1956
- T. xystophanes (Alexander, 1921)

- Subgenus Euteucholabis Alexander, 1947

- T. nepenthe Alexander, 1947
- T. paradoxa Alexander, 1913

- Subgenus Paratropesa Schiner, 1866

- T. chalybeia Alexander, 1927
- T. collaris (Osten Sacken, 1888)
- T. inouei Alexander, 1955
- T. laneana Alexander, 1959
- T. neocollaris Alexander, 1944
- T. nigrocoxalis Alexander, 1936
- T. nodulifera Alexander, 1949
- T. paracollaris Alexander, 1945
- T. placabilis Alexander, 1941
- T. praeusta (Osten Sacken, 1886)
- T. singularis (Schiner, 1868)
- T. subchalybeia Alexander, 1979
- T. subcollaris Alexander, 1940

- Subgenus Teucholabis Osten Sacken, 1860

- T. aberrans Alexander, 1923
- T. adamesi Alexander, 1979
- T. aequinigra Alexander, 1941
- T. amapana Alexander, 1959
- T. amblyphallos Alexander, 1966
- T. analis Alexander, 1955
- T. angustapicalis Alexander, 1938
- T. angusticapitis Brunetti, 1918
- T. angustifusca Alexander, 1980
- T. annulata Williston, 1896
- T. annuloabdominalis Senior-White, 1921
- T. anthracina Alexander, 1921
- T. argentea Alexander, 1927
- T. aspilota Alexander, 1948
- T. atahualpa Alexander, 1968
- T. atripennis Alexander, 1940
- T. atrolata Alexander, 1948
- T. audax Alexander, 1913
- T. azuayensis Alexander, 1946
- T. biacifera Alexander, 1949
- T. biarmillata Alexander, 1948
- T. bicolor Osten Sacken, 1881
- T. bidentifera Alexander, 1966
- T. bigladius Alexander, 1942
- T. biramosa Alexander, 1940
- T. brevisetosa Alexander, 1941
- T. bruneri Alexander, 1926
- T. cariosa Alexander, 1969
- T. carolinensis Alexander, 1916
- T. catharinensis Alexander, 1931
- T. chalybeiventris (Loew, 1861)
- T. cinderella Alexander, 1969
- T. cinereiceps Alexander, 1928
- T. circumscripta Alexander, 1945
- T. cocaensis Alexander, 1980
- T. cockerellae Alexander, 1915
- T. colomelania Alexander, 1968
- T. complexa Osten Sacken, 1860
- T. confluenta Alexander, 1925
- T. confluentoides Alexander, 1931
- T. cuneiformis Alexander, 1947
- T. cybele Alexander, 1955
- T. dampfi Alexander, 1927
- T. dasytes Alexander, 1962
- T. decora Alexander, 1920
- T. dedecora Alexander, 1936
- T. delandi Alexander, 1941
- T. denuda Alexander, 1943
- T. desdemona Alexander, 1949
- T. determinata Osten Sacken, 1888
- T. diacantha Alexander, 1979
- T. diana Alexander, 1944
- T. dilatipes Alexander, 1979
- T. dileuca Alexander, 1947
- T. dimelanocycla Alexander, 1973
- T. diperone Alexander, 1969
- T. diplaca Alexander, 1945
- T. distifurca Alexander, 1943
- T. diversipes Alexander, 1960
- T. ducalis Alexander, 1949
- T. duidensis Alexander, 1931
- T. duncani Alexander, 1946
- T. egens Alexander, 1952
- T. elissa Alexander, 1948
- T. eremnopoda Alexander, 1969
- T. felicita Alexander, 1969
- T. femorata de Meijere, 1916
- T. fenestrata Osten Sacken, 1888
- T. flavithorax (Wiedemann, 1821)
- T. flavocincta Alexander, 1980
- T. flavofimbria Alexander, 1968
- T. foersteri Alexander, 1952
- T. formosissima Alexander, 1947
- T. fulgens Alexander, 1913
- T. fulvinota Alexander, 1962
- T. fulviventris Alexander, 1970
- T. furva Alexander, 1930
- T. fuscoapicalis Alexander, 1937
- T. galatea Alexander, 1949
- T. glabripes de Meijere, 1913
- T. gorana Alexander, 1948
- T. gowdeyi Alexander, 1928
- T. gracilis Osten Sacken, 1886
- T. gudalurensis Alexander, 1950
- T. gurneyana Alexander, 1950
- T. hera Alexander, 1949
- T. hilaris Alexander, 1913
- T. holomelania Alexander, 1979
- T. homilacantha Alexander, 1968
- T. hondurensis Alexander, 1941
- T. hypomela Alexander, 1948
- T. idiophallus Alexander, 1942
- T. immaculata Alexander, 1922
- T. immaculipleura Alexander, 1947
- T. inca Alexander, 1968
- T. inepta Alexander, 1942
- T. inermis Alexander, 1969
- T. inornata Riedel, 1918
- T. insolita Alexander, 1979
- T. inulta Alexander, 1936
- T. invaripes Alexander, 1936
- T. iriomotensis Alexander, 1935
- T. jaliscana Alexander, 1947
- T. jivaro Alexander, 1944
- T. jocosa Alexander, 1913
- T. jucunda Alexander, 1913
- T. kiangsiensis Alexander, 1937
- T. laeta Alexander, 1913
- T. laidis Alexander, 1966
- T. lais Alexander, 1947
- T. laterospinosa Alexander, 1937
- T. latibasalis Alexander, 1968
- T. lauta Alexander, 1949
- T. laxa Alexander, 1947
- T. leonora Alexander, 1938
- T. leridensis Alexander, 1934
- T. lethe Alexander, 1947
- T. lineipleura Alexander, 1949
- T. lipacantha Alexander, 1969
- T. liponeura Alexander, 1937
- T. lipophleps Alexander, 1937
- T. longisetosa Alexander, 1941
- T. longispina Alexander, 1938
- T. lucida Alexander, 1916
- T. ludicra Alexander, 1949
- T. lugubris Alexander, 1914
- T. luteicolor Alexander, 1942
- T. majuscula Alexander, 1931
- T. manniana Alexander, 1947
- T. marticola Alexander, 1931
- T. megaphallus Alexander, 1968
- T. megaspatha Alexander, 1969
- T. melanocephala (Fabricius, 1787)
- T. melanoderma Alexander, 1980
- T. mendax Alexander, 1920
- T. meridiana Skuse, 1890
- T. metamelania Alexander, 1973
- T. metatibiata Alexander, 1969
- T. miniata Alexander, 1930
- T. minuta Alexander, 1926
- T. molesta Osten Sacken, 1886
- T. morionella (Schiner, 1868)
- T. multispinosa Alexander, 1944
- T. munda Alexander, 1913
- T. myersi Alexander, 1926
- T. mythica Alexander, 1926
- T. nebulipennis Alexander, 1928
- T. neoleridensis Alexander, 1940
- T. neosalva Alexander, 1943
- T. nigerrima Edwards, 1916
- T. nigrirostris Alexander, 1948
- T. nigroclavaria Alexander, 1946
- T. nigrocorporis Alexander, 1937
- T. nigrocostata Alexander, 1939
- T. nigropostica Alexander, 1938
- T. nigrosignata Alexander, 1931
- T. nocticolor Edwards, 1919
- T. noctula Alexander, 1971
- T. nocturna Alexander, 1941
- T. nodipes Speiser, 1913
- T. omissa Alexander, 1921
- T. omissinervis Alexander, 1921
- T. ornata Brunetti, 1918
- T. oteroi Alexander, 1936
- T. pabulatoria Alexander, 1920
- T. pahangensis Edwards, 1928
- T. paraplecioides Alexander, 1960
- T. paraxantha Alexander, 1962
- T. parishiana Alexander, 1930
- T. patens Alexander, 1939
- T. perangusta Alexander, 1939
- T. perbasalis Alexander, 1949
- T. perebenina Alexander, 1979
- T. perlata Alexander, 1943
- T. perproducta Alexander, 1969
- T. phaeostigmosa Alexander, 1980
- T. pilipes (Walker, 1856)
- T. platyphallus Alexander, 1945
- T. plecioides de Meijere, 1913
- T. pleuralis Alexander, 1913
- T. pleurolinea Alexander, 1959
- T. podagra Alexander, 1952
- T. polita Osten Sacken, 1888
- T. portoricana Alexander, 1936
- T. progne Alexander, 1950
- T. projecta Alexander, 1949
- T. pruthiana Alexander, 1942
- T. pulchella Alexander, 1913
- T. quinquemaculata Alexander, 1925
- T. rectangularis Alexander, 1952
- T. rectispina Alexander, 1968
- T. reginae Alexander, 1931
- T. retusa Alexander, 1935
- T. rhabdophora Alexander, 1942
- T. rostrata Enderlein, 1912
- T. rubescens Alexander, 1914
- T. rubriceps Alexander, 1937
- T. rubroatra Alexander, 1962
- T. rufula Alexander, 1947
- T. rutilans Alexander, 1932
- T. sackeni Alexander, 1913
- T. salti Alexander, 1930
- T. salva Alexander, 1942
- T. sanguinea Alexander, 1938
- T. scabrosa Alexander, 1938
- T. scapularis (Macquart, 1838)
- T. schineri Enderlein, 1912
- T. schistostyla Alexander, 1969
- T. scitamenta Alexander, 1931
- T. semiermis Alexander, 1980
- T. sentosa Alexander, 1969
- T. seposita Alexander, 1941
- T. serrulifera Alexander, 1945
- T. seticosta Alexander, 1948
- T. setigera Alexander, 1973
- T. shanensis Alexander, 1952
- T. siamensis Edwards, 1928
- T. sigmoidea Alexander, 1949
- T. simplex (Wiedemann, 1828)
- T. solivaga Alexander, 1952
- T. solomonensis Alexander, 1950
- T. spica Alexander, 1943
- T. spinigera Schiner, 1868
- T. stadelmanni Alexander, 1945
- T. strictispina Alexander, 1968
- T. strumosa Alexander, 1942
- T. stygica Alexander, 1914
- T. subanthracina Alexander, 1949
- T. subargentea Alexander, 1948
- T. subclara Alexander, 1971
- T. subfurva Alexander, 1966
- T. subgalatea Alexander, 1959
- T. subinulta Alexander, 1979
- T. subjocosa Alexander, 1942
- T. sublaxa Alexander, 1980
- T. subleridensis Alexander, 1938
- T. submolesta Alexander, 1930
- T. submunda Alexander, 1941
- T. subpatens Alexander, 1966
- T. subpulchella Alexander, 1959
- T. subrubriceps Alexander, 1945
- T. sultana Alexander, 1938
- T. susainathani Alexander, 1950
- T. tactilis Alexander, 1952
- T. taino Alexander, 1964
- T. talamancana Alexander, 1939
- T. tartarus Alexander, 1949
- T. tenella Alexander, 1970
- T. thurmani Alexander, 1954
- T. trifasciata Enderlein, 1912
- T. tristis Alexander, 1913
- T. tullochi Alexander, 1945
- T. turrialbensis Alexander, 1945
- T. unicingulata Alexander, 1944
- T. unicolor Riedel, 1918
- T. vacuata Alexander, 1980
- T. varipes Alexander, 1980
- T. venezuelensis (Macquart, 1846)
- T. volentis Alexander, 1952
- T. walkeriana Alexander, 1953
- T. wighti Alexander, 1939
- T. wilhelminae Alexander, 1947
- T. wirthiana Alexander, 1969
- T. xantha Alexander, 1953
- T. yezoensis Alexander, 1924
