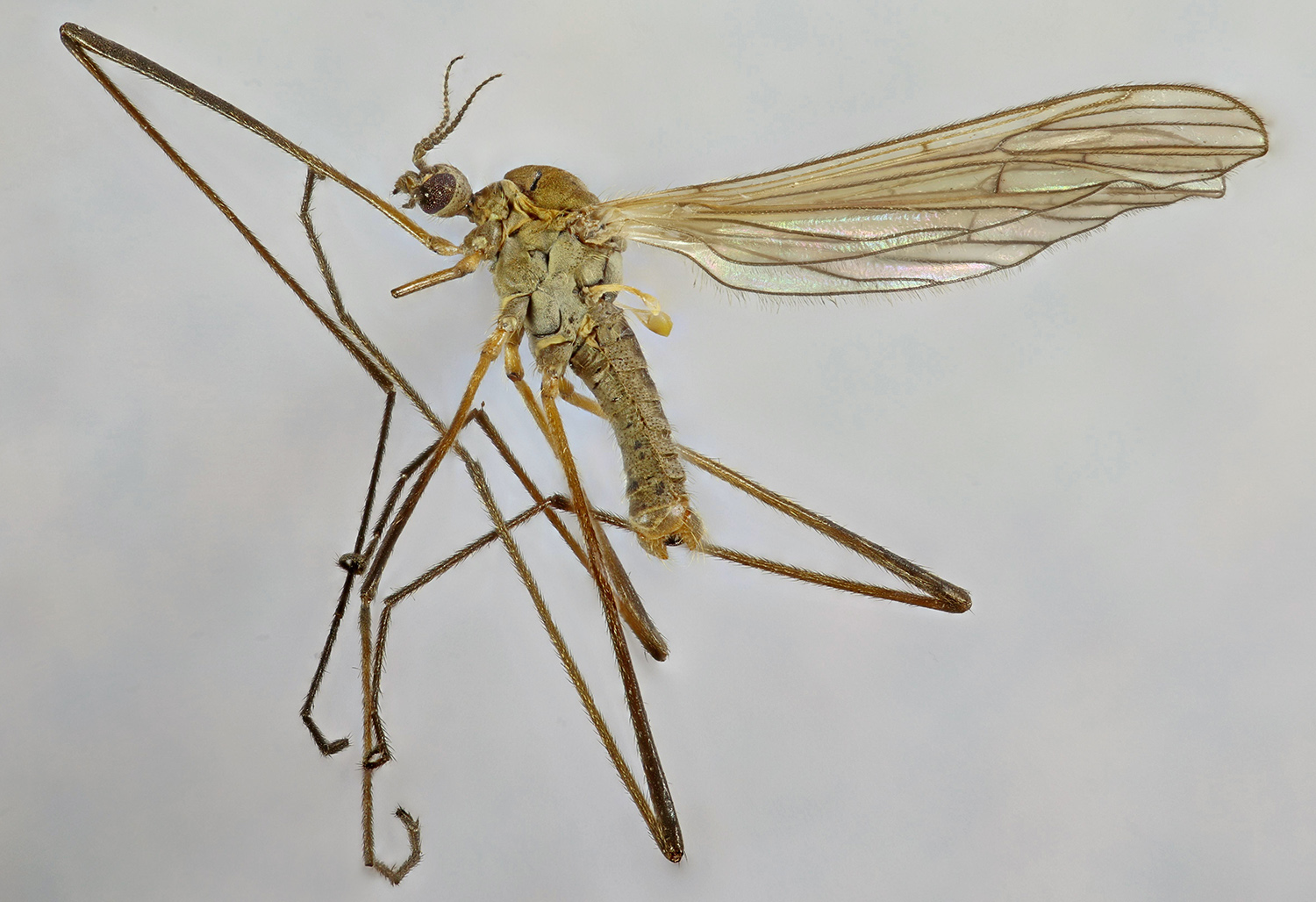
- In Wales

Scientific classification
- Kingdom: Animalia
- Phylum: Arthropoda
- Class: Insecta
- Order: Diptera
- Family: Limoniidae
- Genus: Erioconopa
- Species: E. trivialis

Binomial name
- Erioconopa trivialis (Meigen, 1818)

= Erioconopa trivialis =

Species of fly

Erioconopa trivialis is a Palearctic species of cranefly in the family Limoniidae. It is found in a wide range of habitats and microhabitats: in earth rich in humus, in swamps and marshes, in leaf litter and in wet spots in woods.
