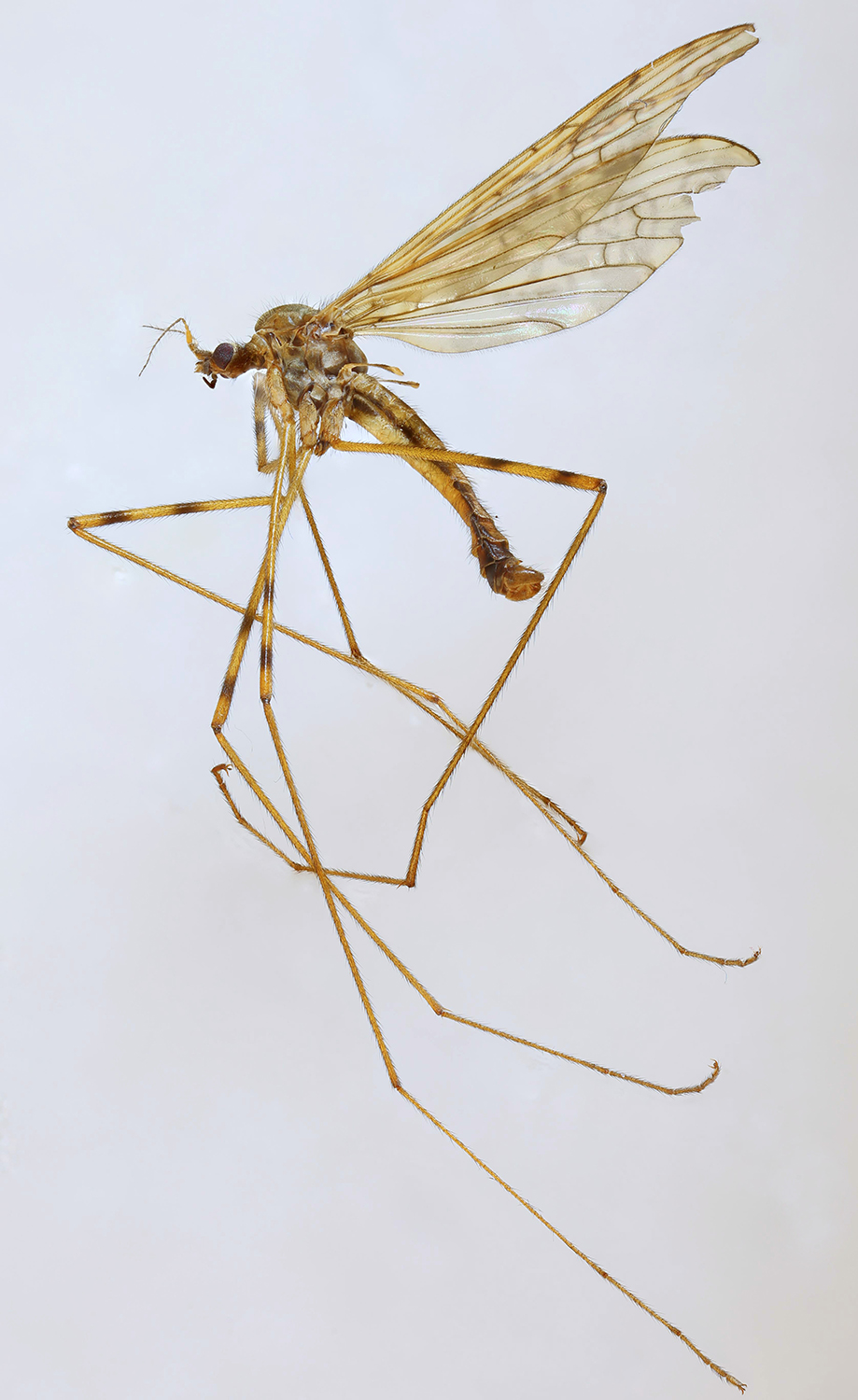
- Epiphragma ocellare North Wales

Scientific classification
- Kingdom: Animalia
- Phylum: Arthropoda
- Clade: Pancrustacea
- Class: Insecta
- Order: Diptera
- Family: Limoniidae
- Genus: Epiphragma
- Species: E. ocellare

Binomial name
- Epiphragma ocellare (Linnaeus, 1761)

= Epiphragma ocellare =

Species of fly

Epiphragma ocellare is a species of fly in the family Limoniidae. It is found in the Palearctic.
