= Horistomyia =

Scientific classification
- Kingdom: Animalia
- Phylum: Arthropoda
- Clade: Pancrustacea
- Class: Insecta
- Order: Diptera
- Family: Limoniidae
- Subfamily: Chioneinae
- Genus: Horistomyia; Alexander, 1924

Type species
- Gonomyia leucophaea Skuse, 1890

Species
- see text

Genus of flies

Horistomyia is a genus of crane fly in the family Limoniidae.

== Distribution ==
Australia.

== Species ==
- H. leucophaea (Skuse, 1890)
- H. occidentalis Alexander, 1929
- H. oxycantha Alexander, 1966
- H. victoriae Alexander, 1929
