= Phyllolabis myriosticta =

Scientific classification
- Domain: Eukaryota
- Kingdom: Animalia
- Phylum: Arthropoda
- Class: Insecta
- Order: Diptera
- Family: Limoniidae
- Genus: Phyllolabis
- Species: P. myriosticta

Binomial name
- Phyllolabis myriosticta Alexander, 1945

Species of fly

Phyllolabis myriosticta is a species of limoniid crane fly in the family Limoniidae.
