= Rhypholophus =

Scientific classification
- Kingdom: Animalia
- Phylum: Arthropoda
- Class: Insecta
- Order: Diptera
- Family: Limoniidae
- Subfamily: Chioneinae
- Tribe: Molophilini
- Genus: Rhypholophus; Kolenati, 1860

Type species
- Rhypholophus phryganopterus Kolenati, 1860

Species
- see text

Synonyms
- Dasyptera Schiner, 1863

Genus of flies

Rhypholophus is a genus of crane fly in the family Limoniidae.

== Distribution ==
Europe & North America.

== Species ==
- R. arapaho (Alexander, 1958)
- R. bicuspidatus (Alexander, 1945)
- R. bifidarius (Alexander, 1919)
- R. bifurcatus Goetghebuer, 1920
- R. dufouri Geiger and Podenas, 1993
- R. fumatus Doane, 1900
- R. haemorrhoidalis (Zetterstedt, 1838)
- R. hoodianus (Alexander, 1945)
- R. imitator Savchenko, 1981
- R. intermixtus (Savchenko, 1973)
- R. libellus (Alexander, 1943)
- R. lichtwardti (Lackschewitz, 1935)
- R. malickyi (Mendl, 1975)
- R. obtusistyla (Stary, 1976)
- R. oregonicus (Alexander, 1945)
- R. paradiseus (Alexander, 1920)
- R. phryganopterus Kolenati, 1860
- R. simulans (Savchenko, 1973)
- R. suffumatus (Alexander, 1943)
- R. varius (Meigen, 1818)
- R. wasatchensis (Alexander, 1948)
