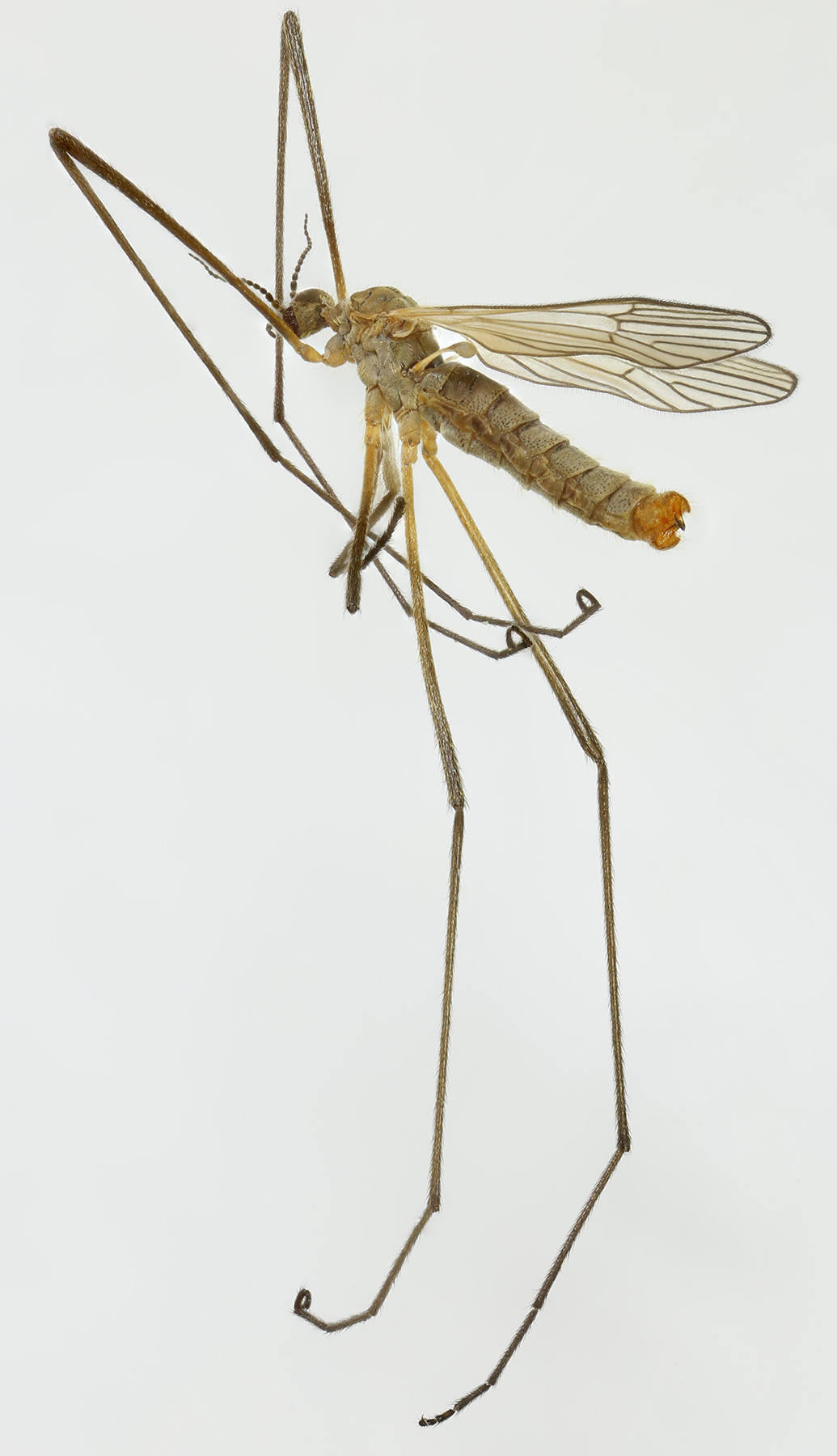
- Erioconopa diuturna North Wales

Scientific classification
- Kingdom: Animalia
- Phylum: Arthropoda
- Clade: Pancrustacea
- Class: Insecta
- Order: Diptera
- Family: Limoniidae
- Genus: Erioconopa
- Species: E. diuturna

Binomial name
- Erioconopa diuturna (Walker, 1848)

= Erioconopa diuturna =

Species of fly

Erioconopa diuturna is a species of fly in the family Limoniidae. It is found in the Palearctic.
