= Beringomyia =

Scientific classification
- Kingdom: Animalia
- Phylum: Arthropoda
- Class: Insecta
- Order: Diptera
- Family: Limoniidae
- Subfamily: Chioneinae
- Genus: Beringomyia; Savchenko, 1980

Type species
- Ormosia cata Alexander, 1940

Species
- See text

Genus of flies

Beringomyia is an Asian genus of crane fly in the family Limoniidae.

== Species ==
- B. cata (Alexander, 1940)
- B. deprava (Alexander, 1941)
- B. politonigra Savchenko, 1980
- B. prava (Alexander, 1940)
