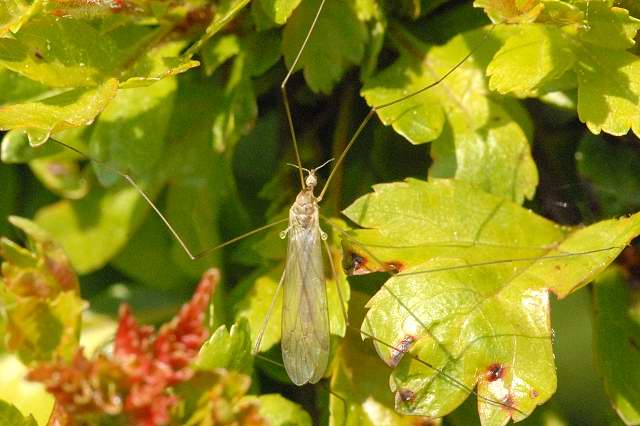

Scientific classification
- Kingdom: Animalia
- Phylum: Arthropoda
- Class: Insecta
- Order: Diptera
- Family: Limoniidae
- Genus: Ormosia
- Species: O. nodulosa

Binomial name
- Ormosia nodulosa (Macquart, 1826)

= Ormosia nodulosa =

Species of fly

Ormosia nodulosa is a Palearctic species of craneflies in the family Limoniidae. It is found in a wide range of habitats and micro habitats: in earth rich in humus, in swamps and marshes, in leaf litter and in wet spots in woods.
