= Eriopterella =

Scientific classification
- Kingdom: Animalia
- Phylum: Arthropoda
- Clade: Pancrustacea
- Class: Insecta
- Order: Diptera
- Family: Limoniidae
- Subfamily: Chioneinae
- Genus: Eriopterella; Alexander, 1929

Type species
- Erioptera jaffueli Alexander, 1929

Species
- See text

Genus of flies

Eriopterella is a genus of crane fly in the family Limoniidae.

== Species ==
- E. breviseta (Alexander, 1968)
- E. jaffueli (Alexander, 1929)
- E. pilosipes (Alexander, 1929)
