= Maietta =

Scientific classification
- Kingdom: Animalia
- Phylum: Arthropoda
- Class: Insecta
- Order: Diptera
- Family: Limoniidae
- Subfamily: Chioneinae
- Genus: Maietta; Alexander, 1929

Type species
- M. squamigera Alexander, 1929

Species
- See text

Genus of flies

Maietta is a genus of crane fly in the family Limoniidae.

== Distribution ==
Chile.

== Species ==
- M. squamigera Alexander, 1929
- M. trimedia Alexander, 1967
