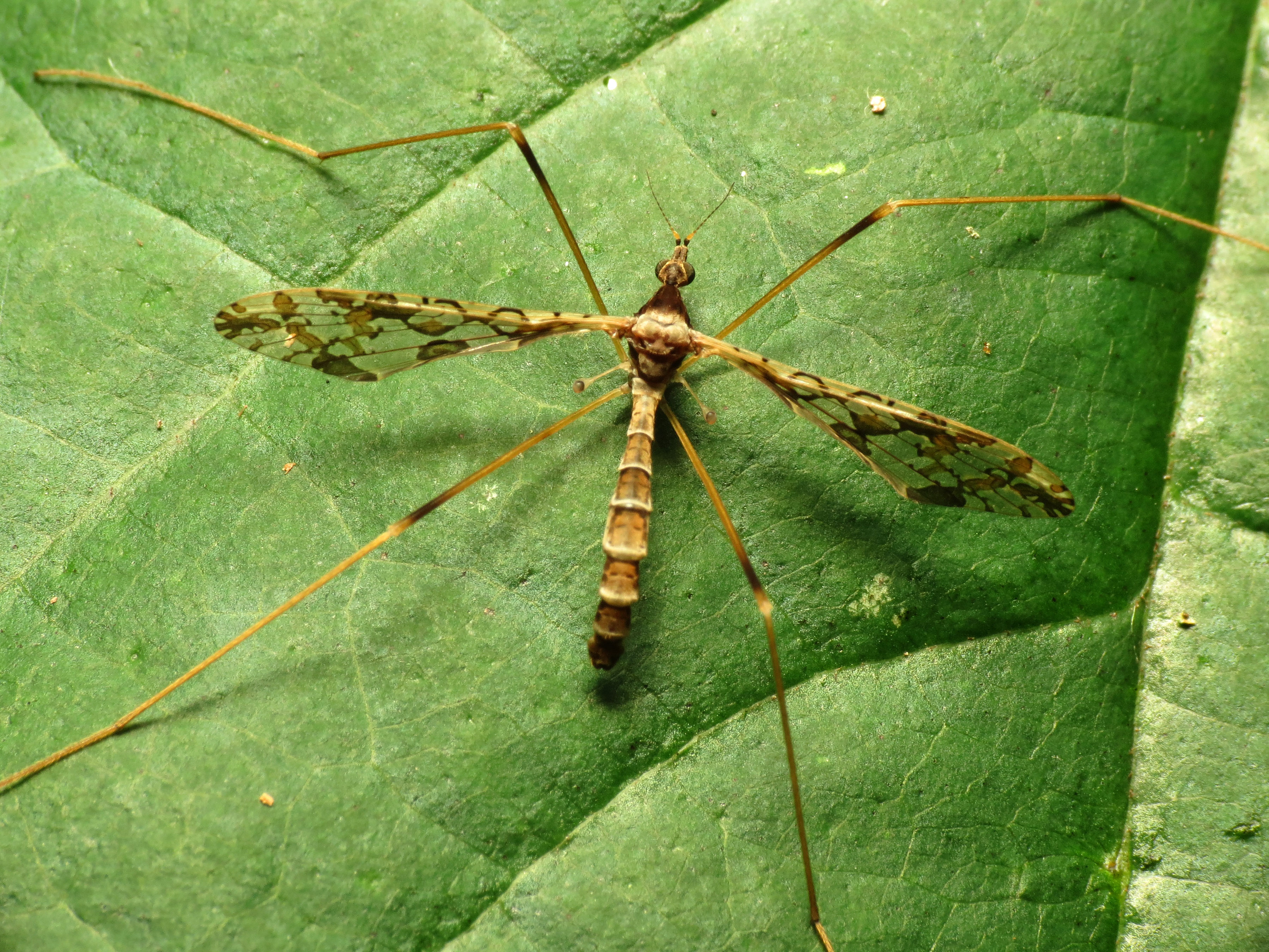

Scientific classification
- Kingdom: Animalia
- Phylum: Arthropoda
- Clade: Pancrustacea
- Class: Insecta
- Order: Diptera
- Family: Limoniidae
- Genus: Epiphragma
- Species: E. solatrix

Binomial name
- Epiphragma solatrix (Osten Sacken, 1859)

Synonyms
- Limnophila solatrix Osten Sacken, 1859

= Epiphragma solatrix =

Species of fly

Epiphragma solatrix is a species of limoniid crane fly in the family Limoniidae. It has a range from the United States through the Neotropical realm, including Argentina. Larvae feed on and live in wood.

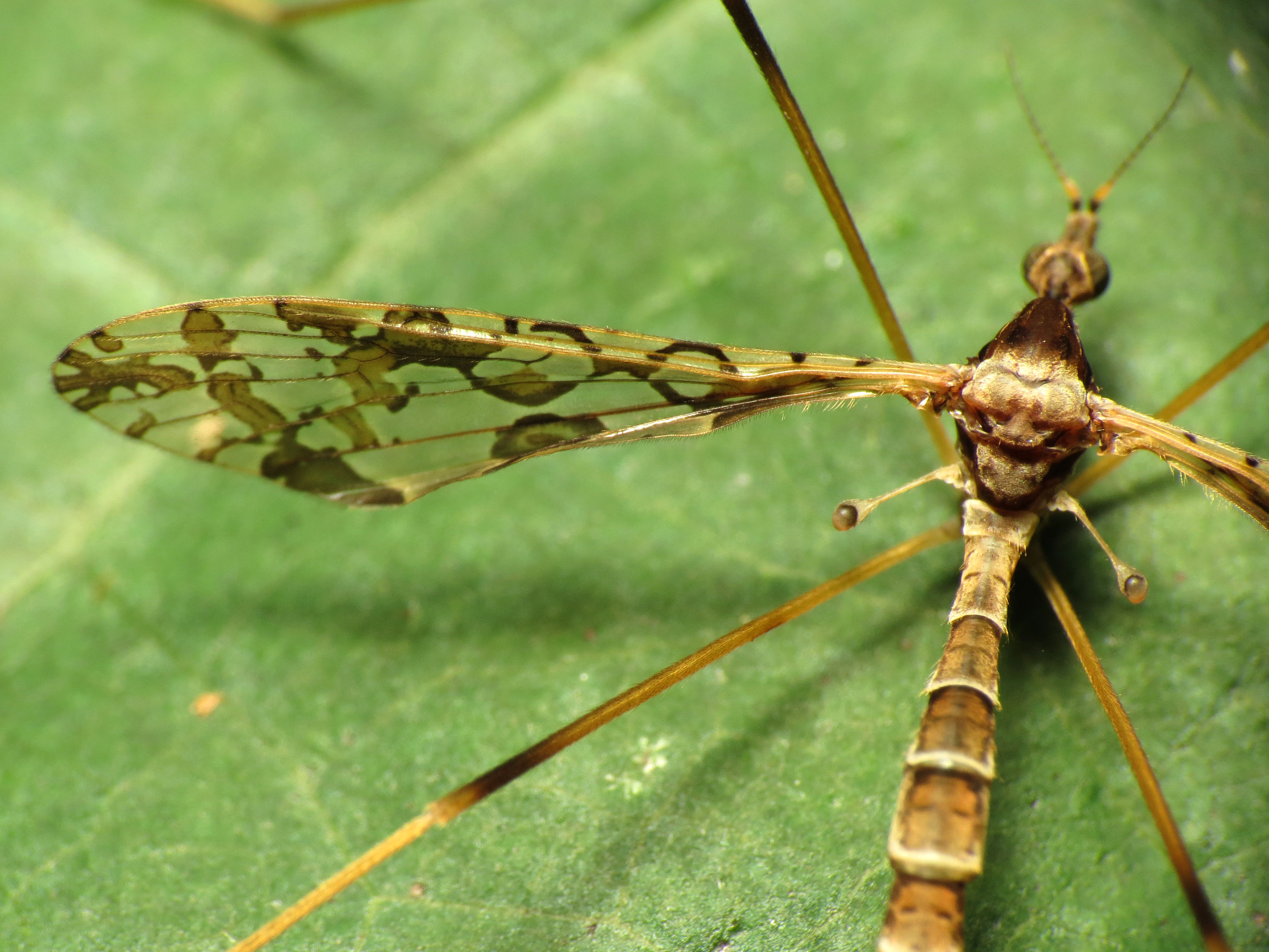
