= Gonomyopsis =

Scientific classification
- Kingdom: Animalia
- Phylum: Arthropoda
- Class: Insecta
- Order: Diptera
- Family: Limoniidae
- Genus: Gonomyopsis; Alexander, 1966
- Species: G. doaneana

Binomial name
- Gonomyopsis doaneana Alexander, 1966

Genus of flies

Gonomyopsis is a monotypic genus of crane flies in the family Limoniidae. It was originally described as a subgenus of Gonomyodes. It contains the species Gonomyopsis doaneana.

== Distribution ==
California, United States.
