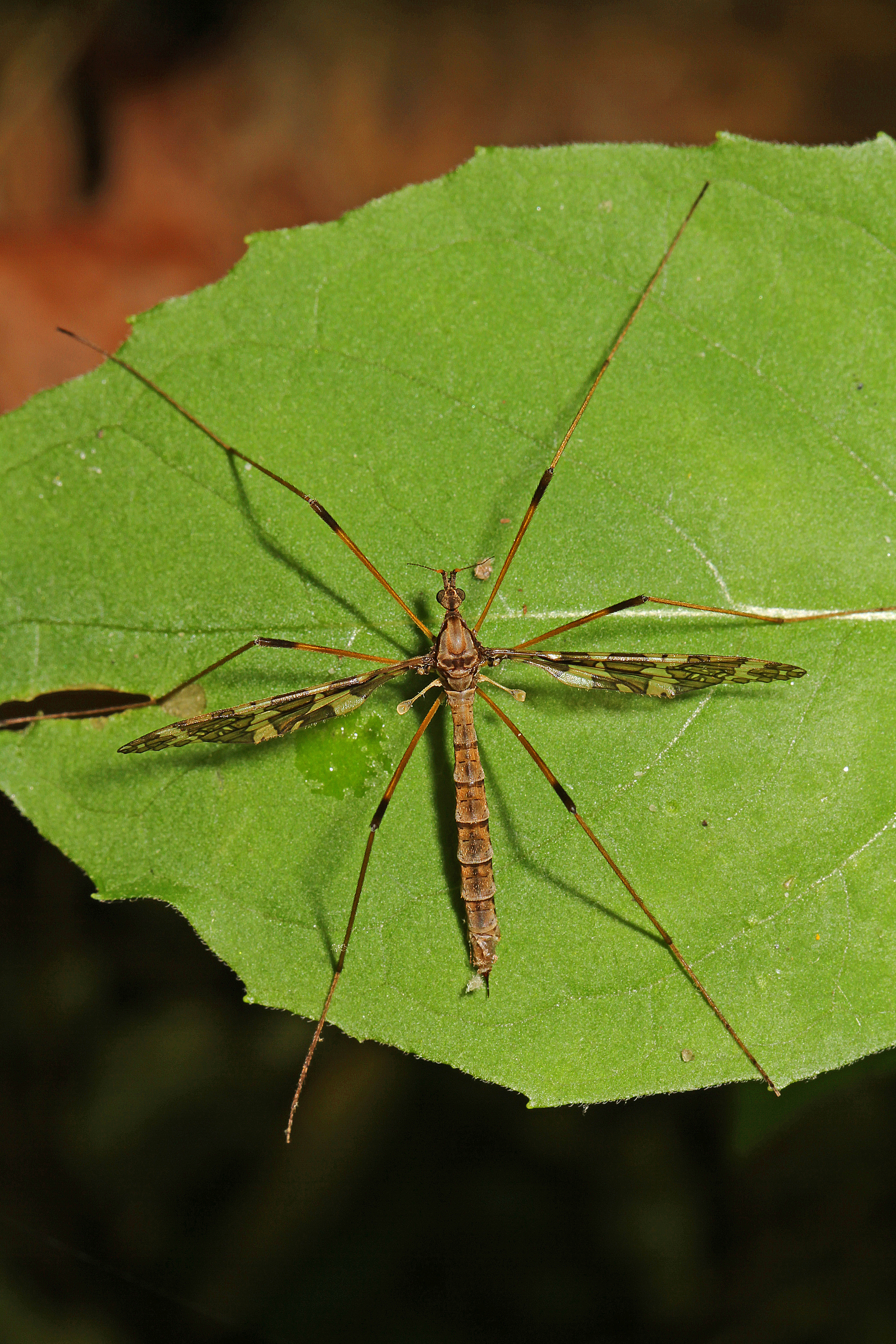

Scientific classification
- Kingdom: Animalia
- Phylum: Arthropoda
- Class: Insecta
- Order: Diptera
- Family: Limoniidae
- Genus: Epiphragma
- Species: E. fasciapenne

Binomial name
- Epiphragma fasciapenne (Say, 1823)

Synonyms
- Limnobia fasciapennis Say, 1823; Limnophila pavonina Osten Sacken, 1859

= Epiphragma fasciapenne =

Species of fly

Epiphragma fasciapenne is a species of limoniid crane fly in the family Limoniidae.
