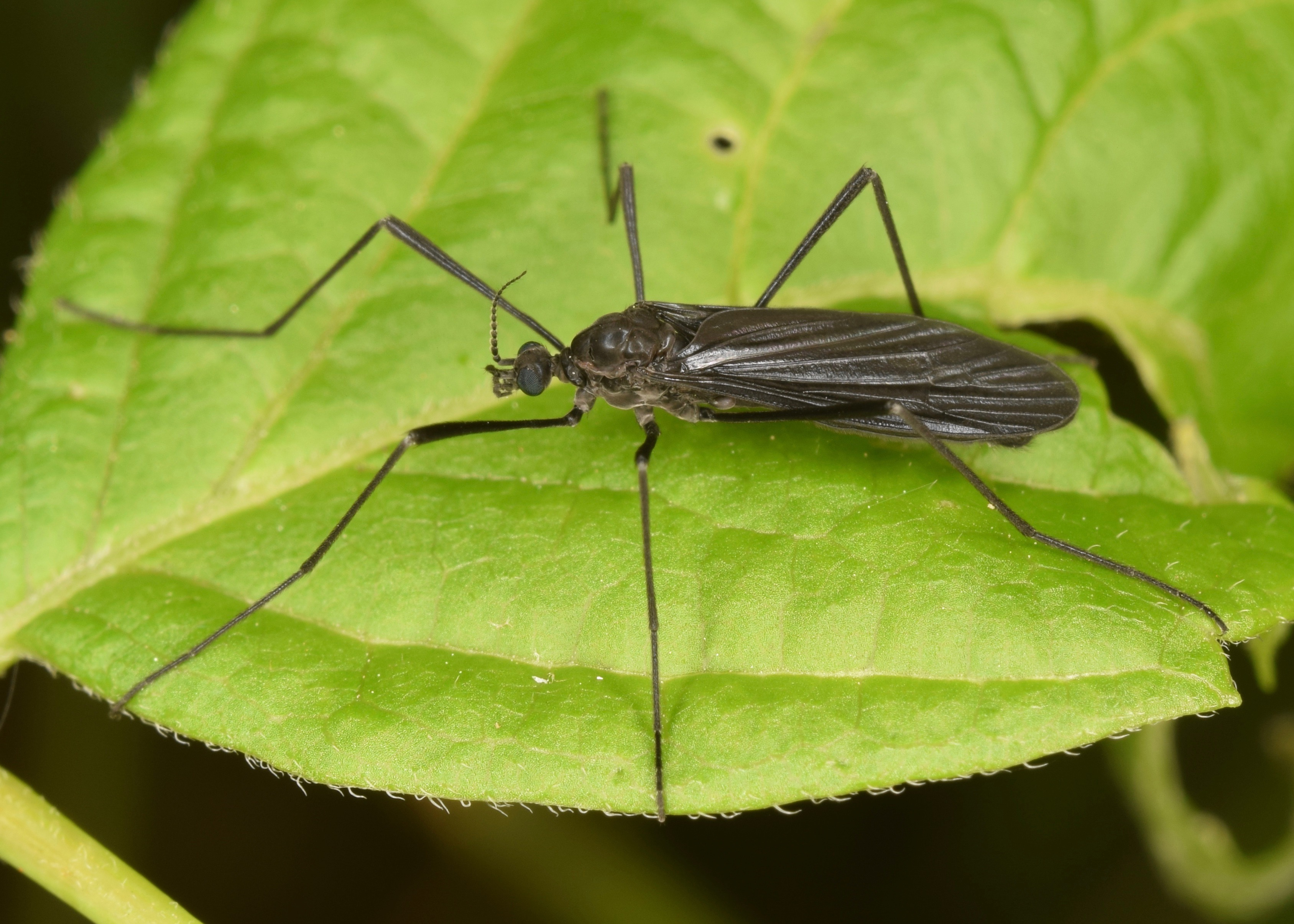

Scientific classification
- Kingdom: Animalia
- Phylum: Arthropoda
- Class: Insecta
- Order: Diptera
- Family: Limoniidae
- Genus: Eugnophomyia
- Species: E. luctuosa

Binomial name
- Eugnophomyia luctuosa (Osten Sacken, 1860)

= Eugnophomyia luctuosa =

Species of fly

Eugnophomyia luctuosa is a species in the family Limoniidae ("limoniid crane flies"), in the order Diptera ("flies").
