= Phyllolabis =

Scientific classification
- Kingdom: Animalia
- Phylum: Arthropoda
- Class: Insecta
- Order: Diptera
- Family: Limoniidae
- Subfamily: Limnophilinae
- Genus: Phyllolabis; Osten Sacken, 1877

Type species
- Phyllolabis claviger Osten Sacken, 1877

Species
- see text

Genus of flies

Phyllolabis is a genus of crane fly in the family Limoniidae.

== Species ==
- P. alexanderi Lackschewitz, 1940
- P. beesoni Alexander, 1929
- P. brunettii Alexander, 1961
- P. bryantiana Alexander, 1931
- P. claviger Osten Sacken, 1877
- P. confluenta Alexander, 1927
- P. czizeki Alexander, 1961
- P. edwardsi Alexander, 1961
- P. encausta Osten Sacken, 1877
- P. fenderiana Alexander, 1949
- P. flavida Alexander, 1918
- P. geigeri Podenas & Stary, 1997
- P. ghilarovi Savchenko, 1983
- P. gohli Mendl, 1976
- P. golanensis Stary & Freidberg, 2007
- P. hemmingseni Nielsen, 1959
- P. hirtiloba Alexander, 1947
- P. hurdi Alexander, 1964
- P. kocmani Koc, 2004
- P. kumpa Alexander, 1961
- P. lackschewitzi Alexander, 1961
- P. lagganensis Alexander, 1931
- P. latifolia Alexander, 1920
- P. laudata Alexander, 1936
- P. limboo Alexander, 1961
- P. lindneri Mannheims, 1959
- P. macroura (Siebke, 1863)
- P. mannheimsi Alexander, 1961
- P. mannheimsiana Nielsen, 1961
- P. mendli Podenas & Stary, 1997
- P. meridionalis Alexander, 1945
- P. moormi Alexander, 1961
- P. myriosticta Alexander, 1945
- P. nielseni Mannheims, 1959
- P. pallidivena Alexander, 1963
- P. parvihalterata
- P. peusi Alexander, 1961
- P. pictivena Alexander, 1932
- P. pubipennis Lackschewitz, 1940
- P. regelationis Alexander, 1953
- P. savtshenkoi Theowald, 1981
- P. seniorwhitei Alexander, 1961
- P. sequoiensis Alexander, 1945
- P. theowaldi Mannheims, 1959
- P. tjederi Savchenko, 1967
- P. vulpecula Alexander, 1936
- P. zionensis Alexander, 1948
