= Gonomyodes =

Scientific classification
- Kingdom: Animalia
- Phylum: Arthropoda
- Class: Insecta
- Order: Diptera
- Family: Limoniidae
- Tribe: Eriopterini
- Genus: Gonomyodes; Alexander, 1948

Type species
- Erioptera knowltonia Alexander, 1948

Species
- See text

Genus of flies

Gonomyodes is a genus of crane fly in the family Limoniidae.

== Distribution ==
All are North American, with the exception of G. similissimus from Kazakhstan.

== Species ==
- G. crickmeri (Alexander, 1949)
- G. knowltonius (Alexander, 1948)
- G. similissimus Savchenko, 1980
- G. tacoma (Alexander, 1949)
- G. yohoensis (Alexander, 1952)
