= Enrico Brunetti =

British musician and entomologist (1862–1927)

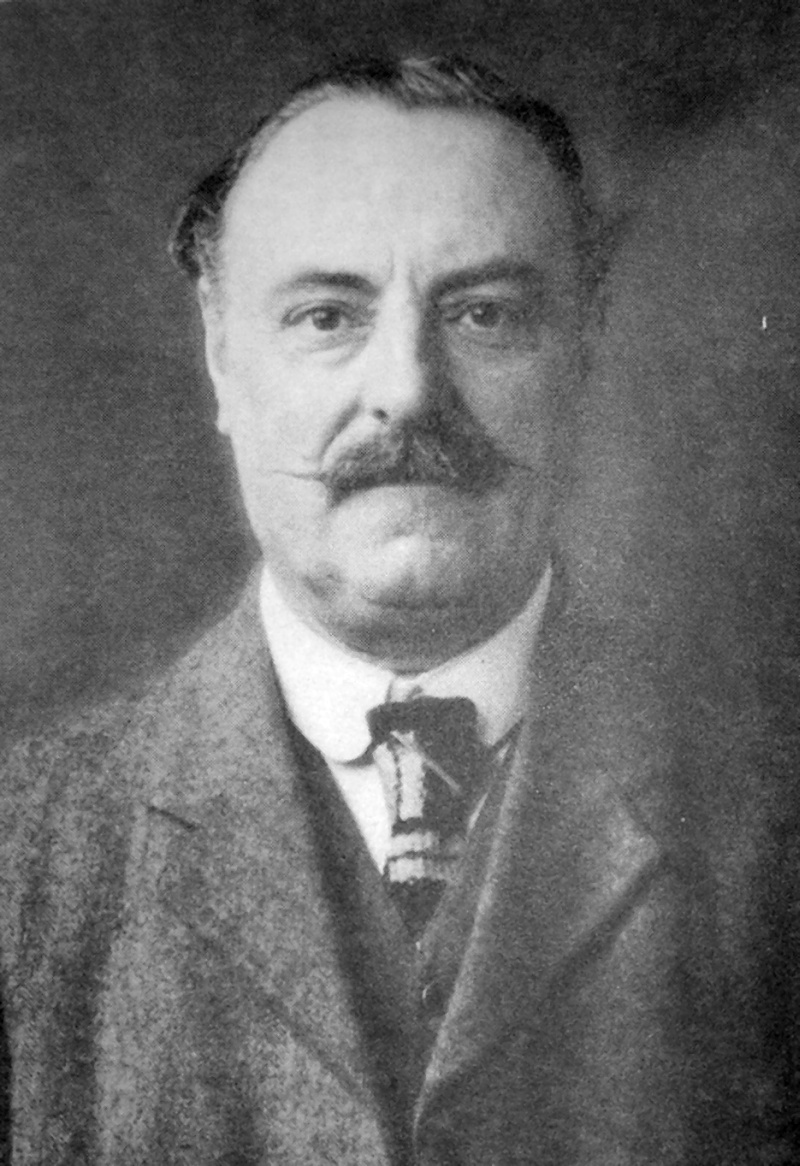

Enrico Adelelmo Brunetti (22 May 1862 – 21 January 1927) was a British musician and entomologist. He specialized in the Diptera and worked for many years in India.

Brunetti was born in London. His mother was from Bath, Somersetshire and his father, of Italian origin came from Fossombrone, Rome, was a confectioner and importer of wines who ran a restaurant in South Kensington. From a young age, Brunetti showed interest in music composition and was trained by Giacomo Ferrari and Enrico Mattei. A musician by profession, Brunetti was a composer for orchestra and piano. He played piano at the Empire, Islington around 1901 and in bands at Plymouth and Llandrindod Wells around 1902 and was a bandmaster in 1903 at Harwich. He went to India as a musical conductor for Tivoli Theatre in Calcutta and for sometime worked with Bandman Opera Company travelling to Singapore and Java. He spent his free time studying entomology, especially Diptera. In 1904 he made a musical tour of the Dutch East Indies, China and Japan making extensive insect collections on his travels. He later settled in Calcutta where he stayed for 17 years. He played piano at the Globe Opera House, Great Eastern and Grand Hotels in Calcutta. He had strict rules and refused to play on Sundays or after the playing of "God Save the King." Aside from music, he took an interest in stamp collecting. He hated the noise of Calcutta and especially detested the cawing of crows, taking out his collector's gun to shoot crows every evening and morning. He spent his summers in Darjeeling and wrote many papers in the Records of the Indian Museum.

Brunetti briefly worked as an Assistant Superintendent in charge at the Indian Museum working on honoraria ranging from 30 to 300 GBP a year. At the suggestion of Thomas Nelson Annandale he was sanctioned leave to go to England to revise his manuscript on Indian Diptera using the material at the British Museum. For this task the Government of India approved 300 GBP for the period of a year. He described species without dissection of the genitalia and had little interest in the biology of living insects. In 1921 he returned to Europe, spending his summers in England where The Imperial Bureau of Entomology employed him to identify specimens. Winters were spent in Paris and Brussels. He worked for long periods on British Diptera. He fell ill during a winter in Paris in 1926-27 and died in a hospital in London.

Before his death, Brunetti gave his collection of 80,000 specimens, and his library to the Natural History Museum. This museum also his manuscripts:- 56 letters and two bound manuscript volumes regarding African and Australasian Diptera.

The Psychodid genus Brunettia was named by Annandale in Brunetti's honour in 1910.

== Works ==
This is a partial list. For a complete list see Smart (1945):

- Revision of the Oriental Tipulidae with descriptions of new species. Rec. Indian Mus. 6: 231-314 (1911).
- New Oriental Nemocera. Rec. Indian Mus. 4: 259-316 (1911).
- Annotated catalog of Oriental Culicidae-supplement. Rec. Indian Mus. 4: 403-517 (1912).
- Critical review of "genera" in Culicidae. Rec. Indian Mus. 10: 15-73 (1914).
- Revision of the Oriental Tipulidae with descriptions of new species. Part II. Rec. Indian Mus. 15: 255-340 (1918).
- Catalogue of Oriental and South Asiatic Nemocera. Rec. Indian Mus. 17: 1-300 Brunetti, E. (1920).
- New Oriental Diptera, I. Rec. Indian Mus. 7: 445-513 (1912).
- New and little-known Cyrtidae (Diptera). Ann. Mag. Nat. Hist. (9)18(107): 561-606 . (1926).

He was also the main contributor to The Fauna of British India, Including Ceylon and Burma. writing the parts.

- Diptera 1. Brachycera (1920) - 401 p - 4 pl
- Diptera 2. Nematocera (1912) - xxviii + 581 p - 12 pl
- Diptera 3. Pipunculidae, Syrphidae, Conopidae, Oestridae (1923) 424 p - 83 fig - 5 pl .
