= E. orientalis =

E. orientalis may refer to:

- Eleutherodactylus orientalis, a frog species endemic to Cuba
- Erioptera orientalis, a crane fly species in the genus Erioptera
- Ervatamia orientalis, a plant species in the genus Ervatamia found in Australia
- Erythrina orientalis, a plant species
- Eudynamys orientalis, the Pacific koel or Eastern koel, a cuckoo species found from Wallacea east to the Solomon Island and south to northern and eastern Australia
- Eurystomus orientalis, the Oriental dollarbird or dollar roller, a bird species

== Synonyms ==
- Erigone orientalis, a synonym for Hylyphantes graminicola, a small spider species with palaearctic distribution

== See also ==
- Orientalis (disambiguation)
