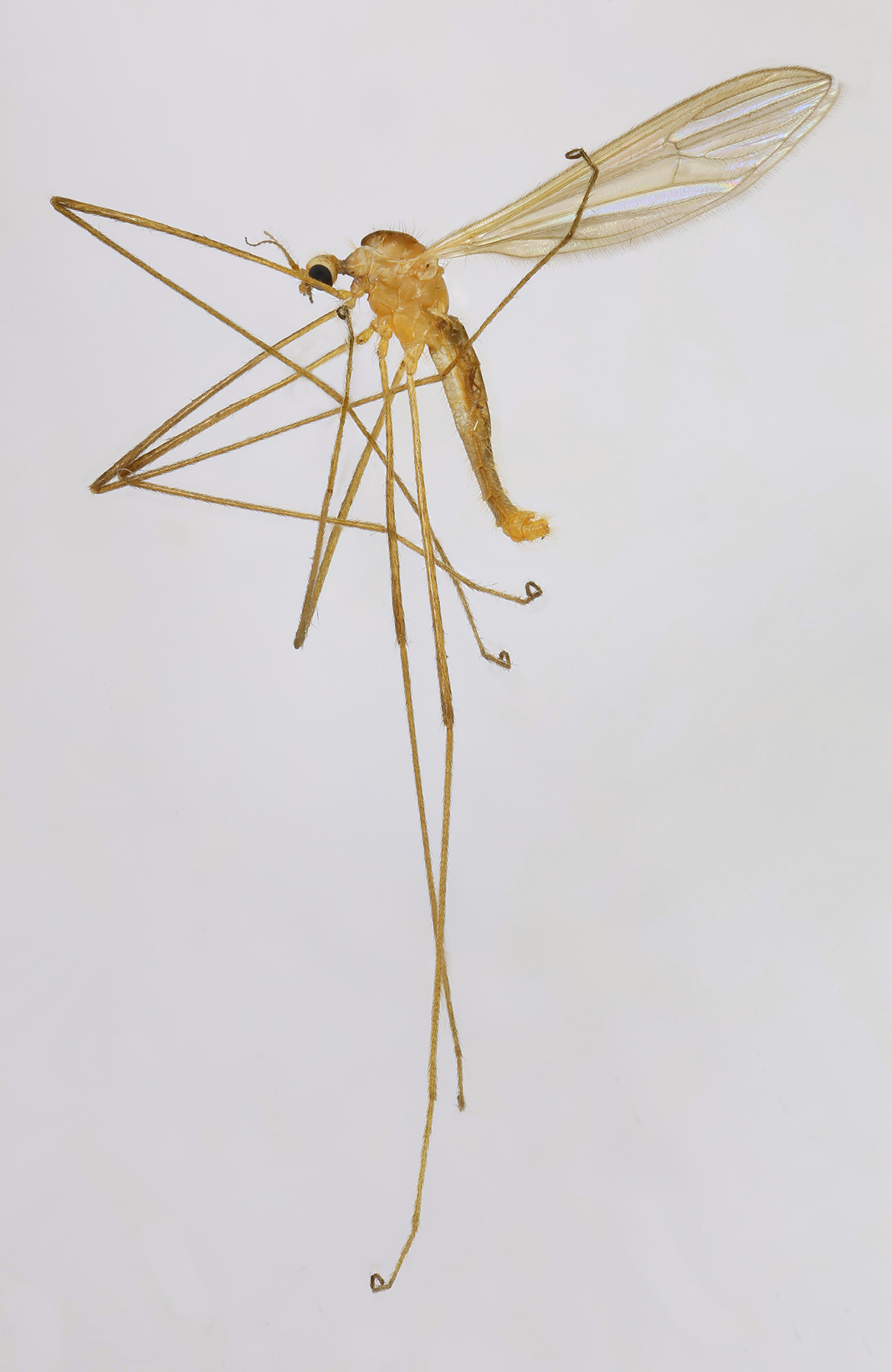
- Individual in North Wales

Scientific classification
- Kingdom: Animalia
- Phylum: Arthropoda
- Clade: Pancrustacea
- Class: Insecta
- Order: Diptera
- Family: Limoniidae
- Genus: Erioptera
- Species: E. lutea

Binomial name
- Erioptera lutea Meigen, 1804

= Erioptera lutea =

Species of fly

Erioptera lutea is a species of fly in the family Limoniidae. It is found in the Palearctic.
