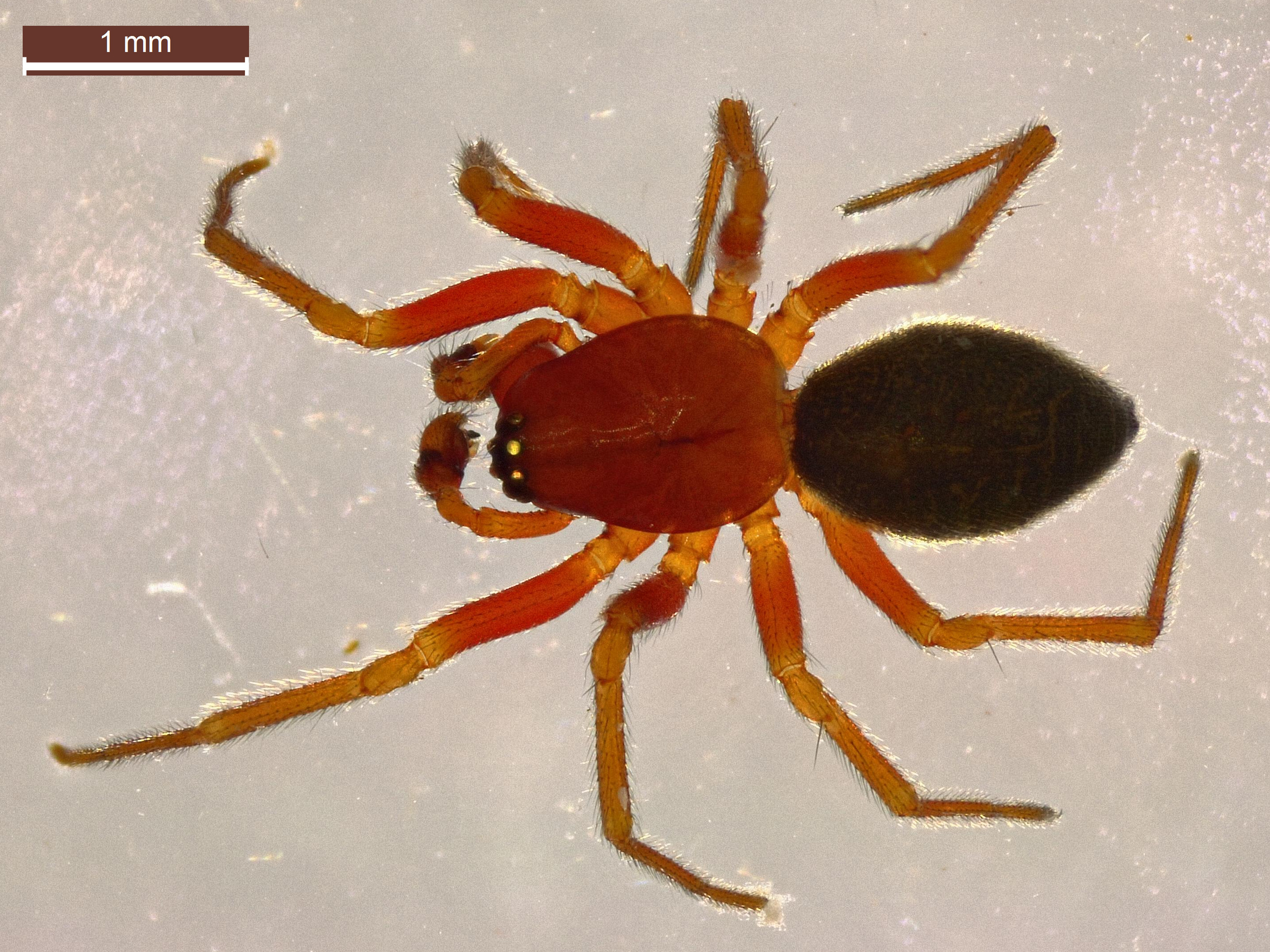
- H. gramnicola

Scientific classification
- Kingdom: Animalia
- Phylum: Arthropoda
- Subphylum: Chelicerata
- Class: Arachnida
- Order: Araneae
- Infraorder: Araneomorphae
- Family: Linyphiidae
- Subfamily: Erigoninae
- Genus: Hylyphantes; Simon, 1884

Type species
- H. nigritus (Simon, 1881)

Species
- 5, see text

Synonyms
- Erigonidium Smith, 1904

= Hylyphantes =

Genus of spiders

Hylyphantes is a genus of dwarf spiders that was first described by Eugène Louis Simon in 1884. It is distinct from related genera by a pair of spiral copulatory ducts in the female, which are matched by a turbinated embolus in the male. Both sexes are similar in appearance; the male has no modifications.

== Species ==
As of May 2019 it contains five species, found in China, Japan, Korea, Laos, Myanmar, Russia, Thailand, and Vietnam:

- Hylyphantes geniculatus Tu & Li, 2003 – China
- Hylyphantes graminicola (Sundevall, 1830) – Europe, Russia (Europe to Far East), China, Korea, Japan, Myanmar, Laos, Thailand, Vietnam
- Hylyphantes nigritus (Simon, 1881) (type) – Europe, Caucasus, Russia (Europe to Far East), China
- Hylyphantes spirellus Tu & Li, 2005 – China
- Hylyphantes tanikawai Ono & Saito, 2001 – Japan (Ryukyu Is.)
