= Erioptera distincta =

Scientific classification
- Kingdom: Animalia
- Phylum: Arthropoda
- Class: Insecta
- Order: Diptera
- Family: Limoniidae
- Genus: Erioptera
- Species: E. distincta

Binomial name
- Erioptera distincta Alexander, 1912

Species of fly

Erioptera distincta is a species of limoniid crane fly in the family Limoniidae.
