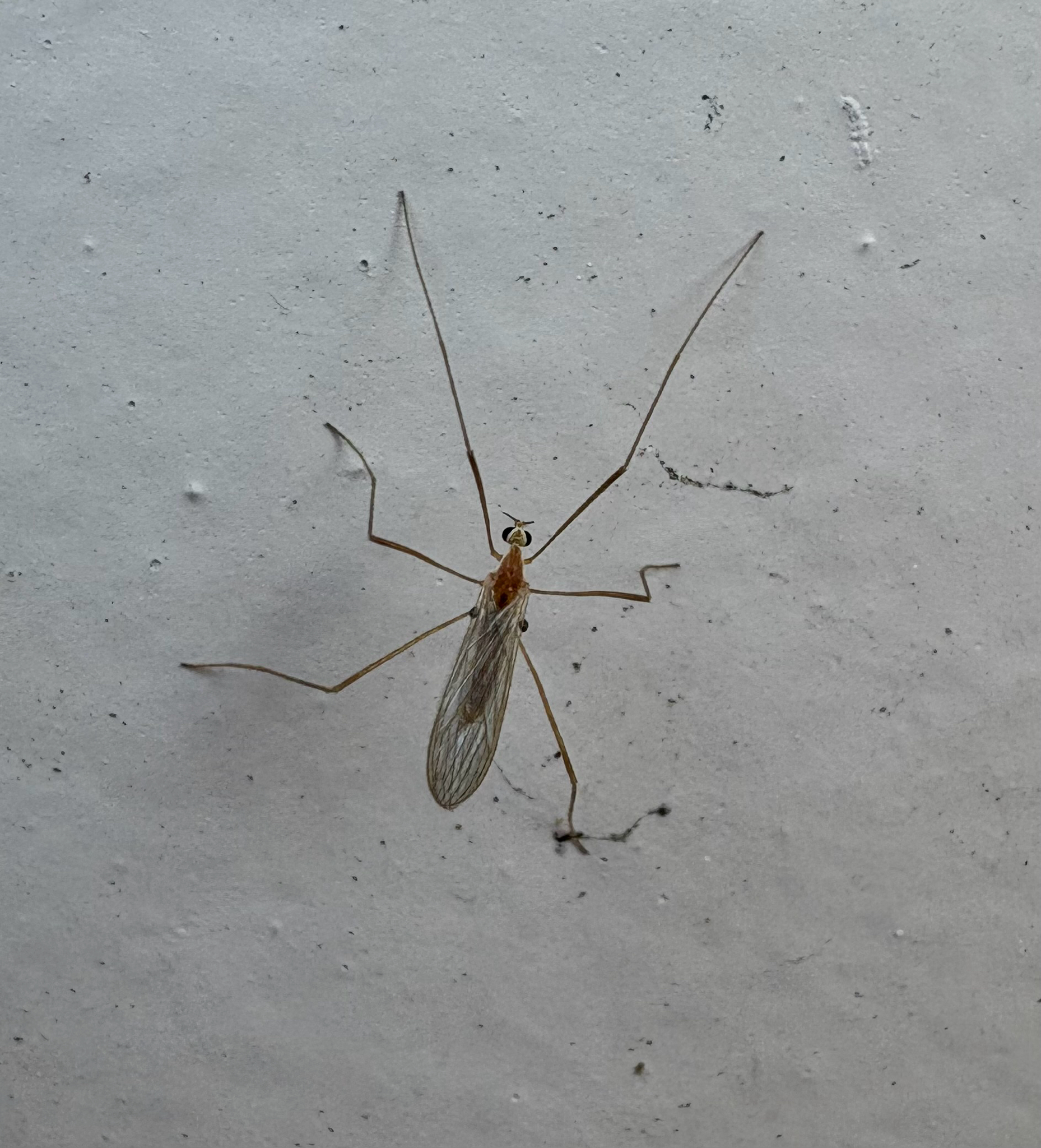

Scientific classification
- Domain: Eukaryota
- Kingdom: Animalia
- Phylum: Arthropoda
- Class: Insecta
- Order: Diptera
- Family: Limoniidae
- Genus: Erioptera
- Species: E. septemtrionis

Binomial name
- Erioptera septemtrionis Osten Sacken, 1859

Synonyms
- Erioptera subseptemtrionis Alexander, 1920

= Erioptera septemtrionis =

Species of fly

Erioptera septemtrionis is a species of limoniid crane fly in the family Limoniidae. The word septemtrionis means "Northern" in Latin
