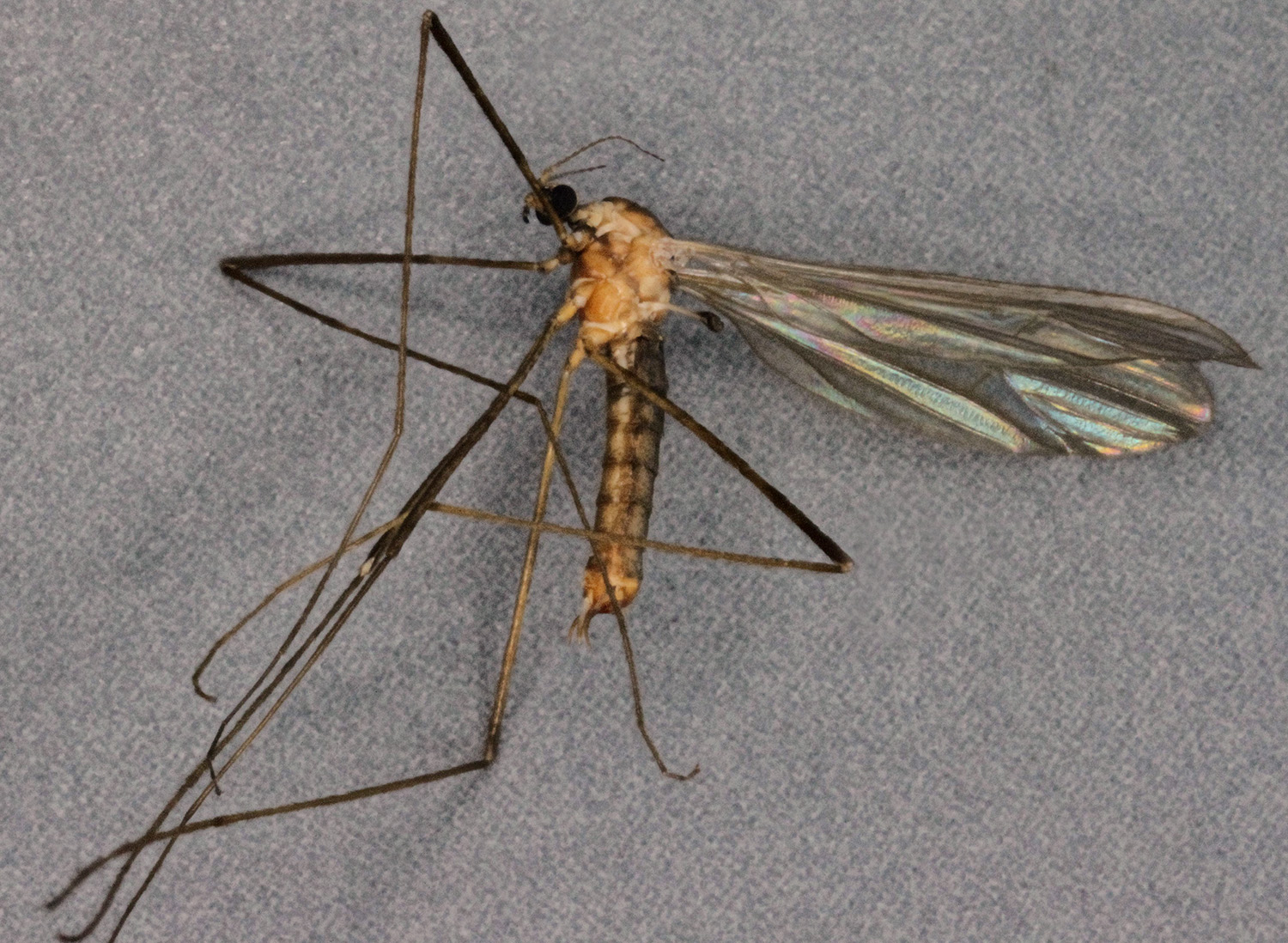
- Erioptera nielseni North Wales

Scientific classification
- Kingdom: Animalia
- Phylum: Arthropoda
- Clade: Pancrustacea
- Class: Insecta
- Order: Diptera
- Family: Limoniidae
- Genus: Erioptera
- Species: E. nielseni

Binomial name
- Erioptera nielseni de Meijere, 1921

= Erioptera nielseni =

Species of fly

Erioptera nielseni is a species of fly in the family Limoniidae. It is found in the Palearctic.
