= Erioptera armata =

Scientific classification
- Domain: Eukaryota
- Kingdom: Animalia
- Phylum: Arthropoda
- Class: Insecta
- Order: Diptera
- Family: Limoniidae
- Genus: Erioptera
- Species: E. armata

Binomial name
- Erioptera armata Osten Sacken, 1859

Species of fly

Erioptera armata is a species of limoniid crane fly in the family Limoniidae.
