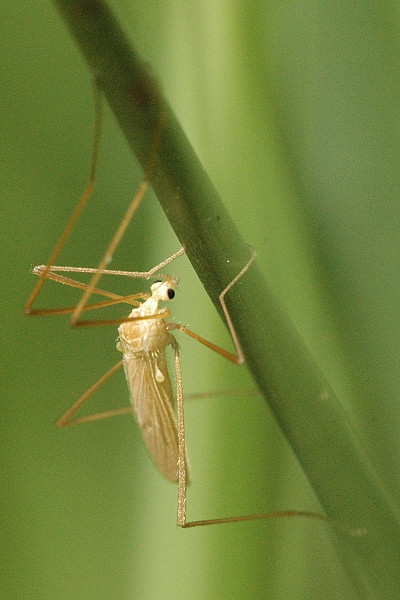

Scientific classification
- Kingdom: Animalia
- Phylum: Arthropoda
- Class: Insecta
- Order: Diptera
- Family: Limoniidae
- Genus: Erioptera
- Species: E. flavata

Binomial name
- Erioptera flavata (Westhoff, 1882)

Synonyms
- Erioptera gemina Tjeder, 1967

= Erioptera flavata =

Species of fly

Erioptera flavata is a species of crane fly in the family Limoniidae. It is found in damp forest.

== Distribution ==
E. flavata is found in most parts of Europe, including the Faroe Islands.
