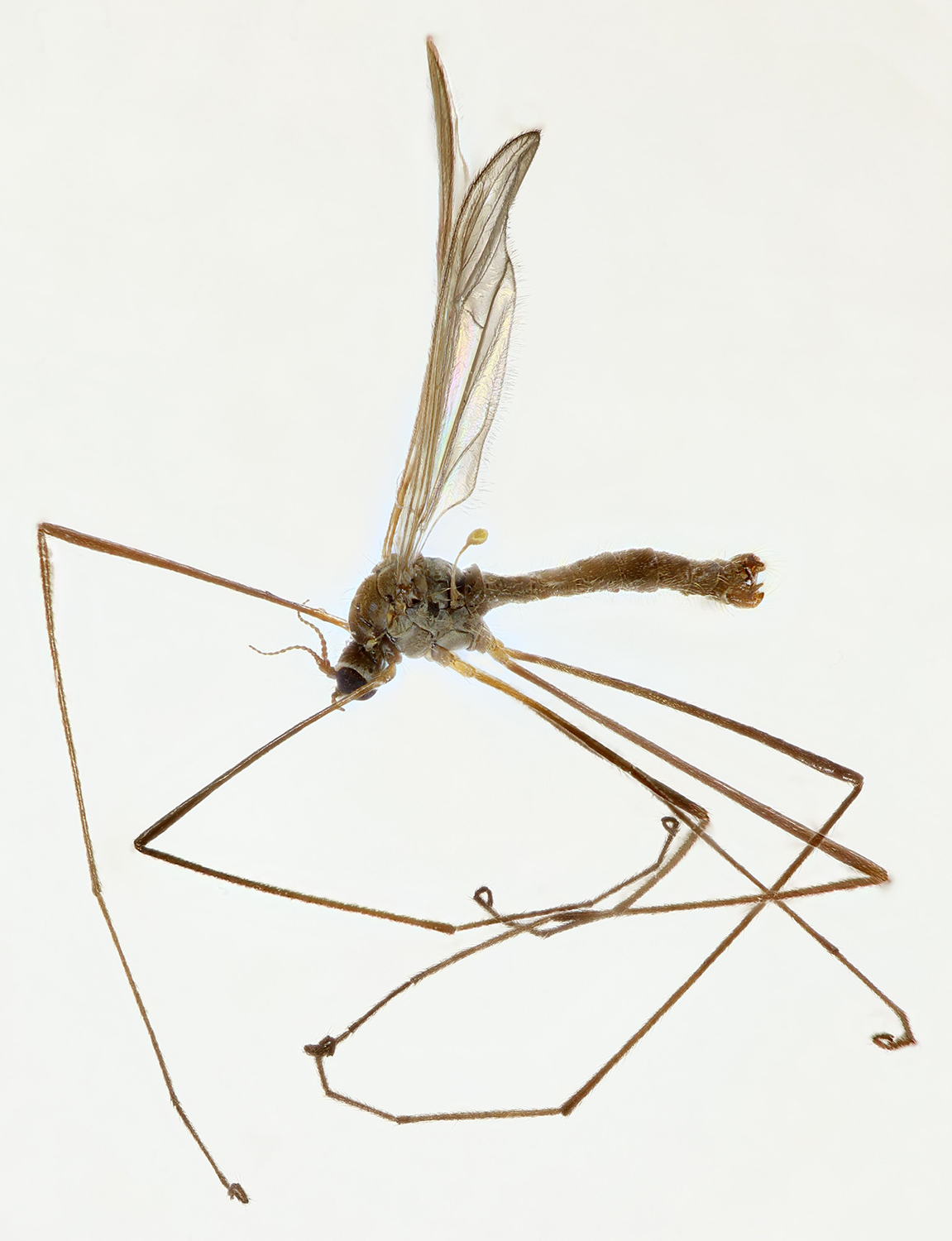
- Erioptera fuscipennis North Wales

Scientific classification
- Kingdom: Animalia
- Phylum: Arthropoda
- Class: Insecta
- Order: Diptera
- Family: Limoniidae
- Genus: Erioptera
- Species: E. fuscipennis

Binomial name
- Erioptera fuscipennis (Meigen, 1818)

= Erioptera fuscipennis =

Species of fly

Erioptera fuscipennis is a Palearctic species of cranefly in the family Limoniidae.It is found in a wide range of habitats and micro habitats: in earth rich in humus, in swamps and marshes, in leaf litter and in wet spots in woods.
