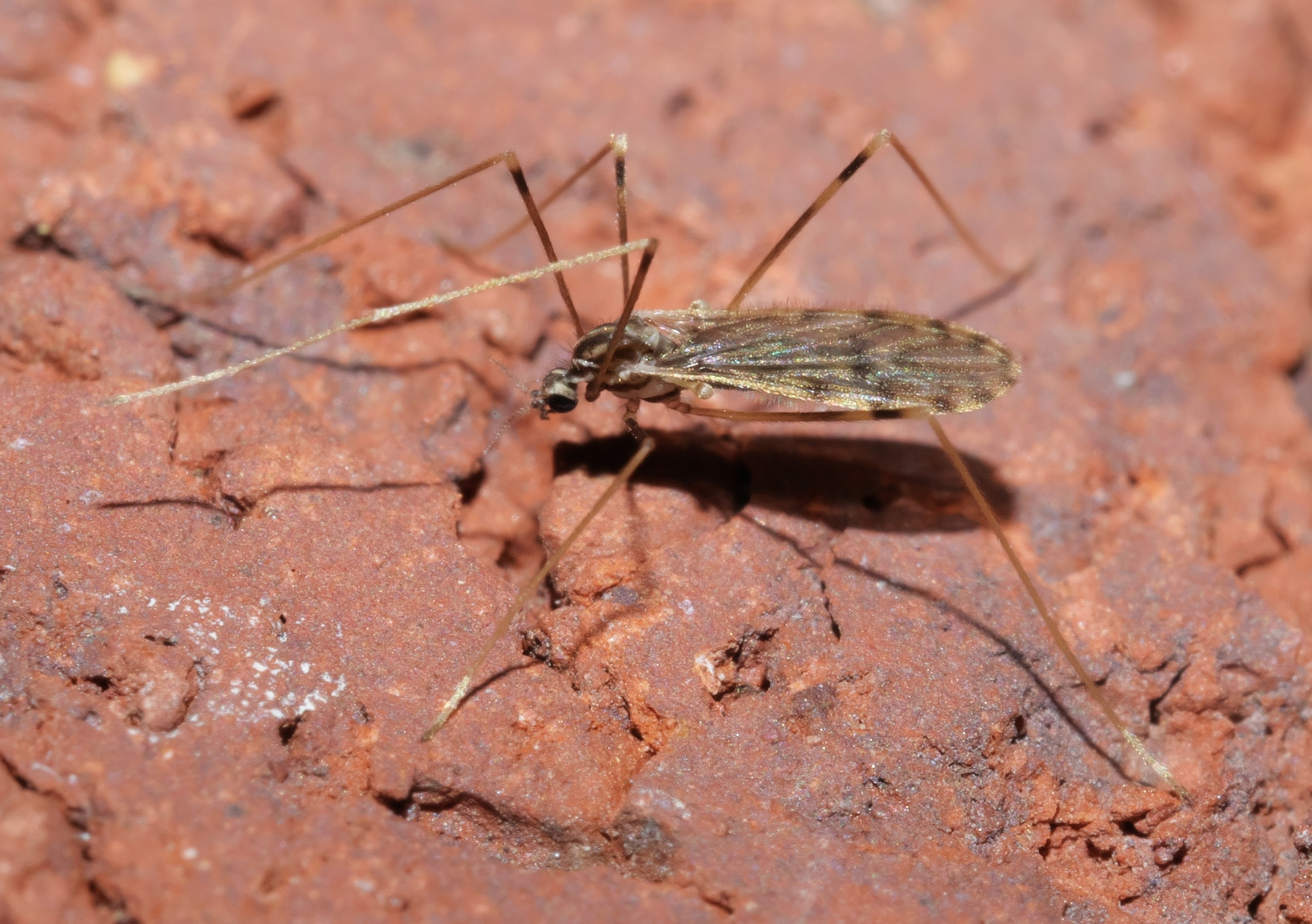
- Erioptera parva, Oklahoma

Scientific classification
- Domain: Eukaryota
- Kingdom: Animalia
- Phylum: Arthropoda
- Class: Insecta
- Order: Diptera
- Family: Limoniidae
- Genus: Erioptera
- Species: E. parva

Binomial name
- Erioptera parva Osten Sacken, 1859

= Erioptera parva =

Species of fly

Erioptera parva is a species of limoniid crane fly in the family Limoniidae.

== Subspecies ==
These two subspecies belong to the species Erioptera parva:

- Erioptera parva brasiliensis Alexander, 1913
- Erioptera parva parva
