= Erioptera needhami =

Scientific classification
- Domain: Eukaryota
- Kingdom: Animalia
- Phylum: Arthropoda
- Class: Insecta
- Order: Diptera
- Family: Limoniidae
- Genus: Erioptera
- Species: E. needhami

Binomial name
- Erioptera needhami Alexander, 1819

Species of fly

Erioptera needhami is a species of limoniid crane fly in the family Limoniidae.
