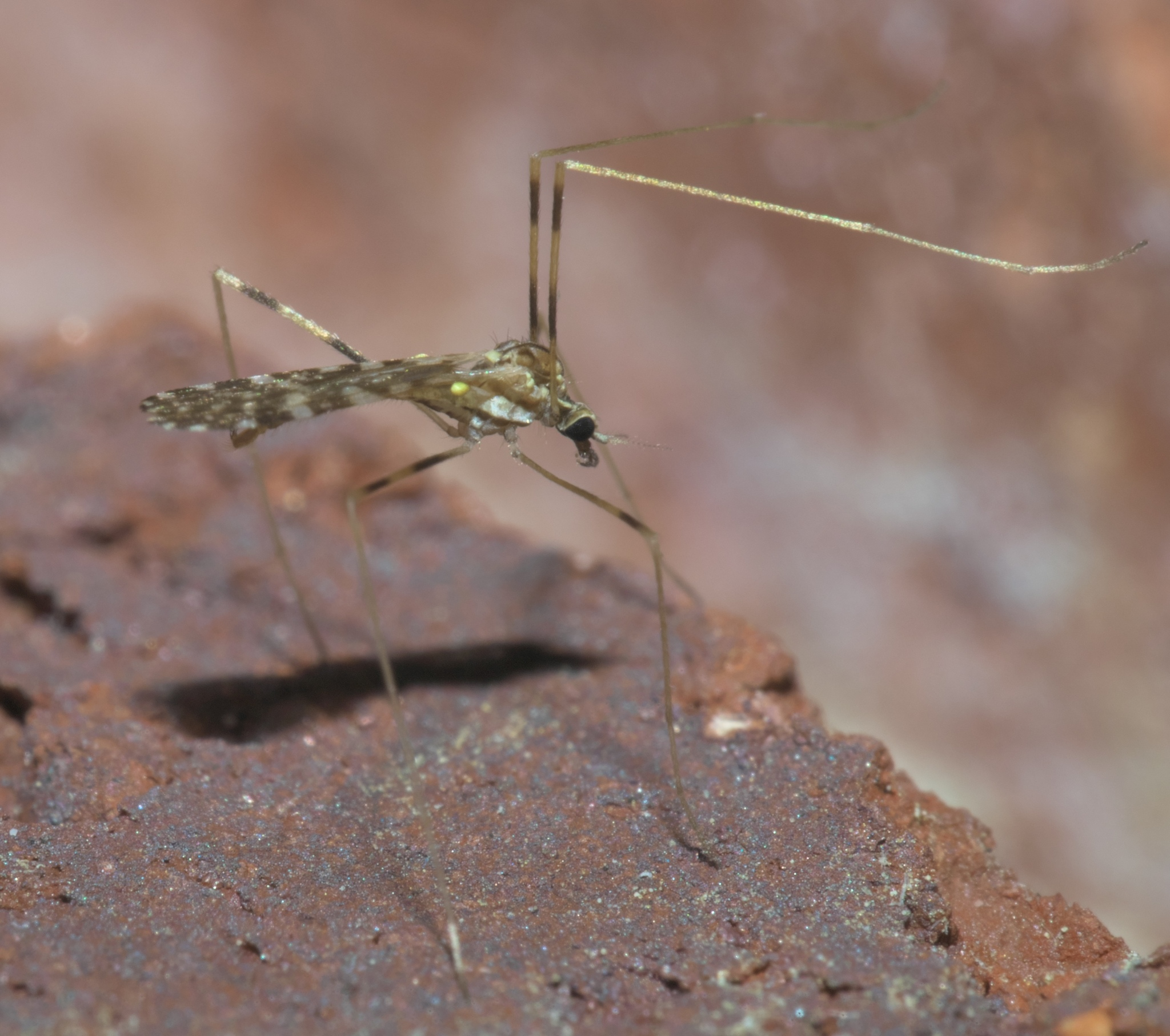
- Erioptera caliptera, Oklahoma

Scientific classification
- Domain: Eukaryota
- Kingdom: Animalia
- Phylum: Arthropoda
- Class: Insecta
- Order: Diptera
- Family: Limoniidae
- Genus: Erioptera
- Species: E. caliptera

Binomial name
- Erioptera caliptera Say, 1823

= Erioptera caliptera =

Species of fly

Erioptera caliptera is a species of limoniid crane fly in the family Limoniidae.

== Subspecies ==
These three subspecies belong to the species Erioptera caliptera:

- Erioptera caliptera caliptera^{g}
- Erioptera caliptera femoranigra Alexander, 1913^{c g}
- Erioptera caliptera subevanescens Alexander, 1940^{c g}

Data sources: i = ITIS, c = Catalogue of Life, g = GBIF, b = Bugguide.net
