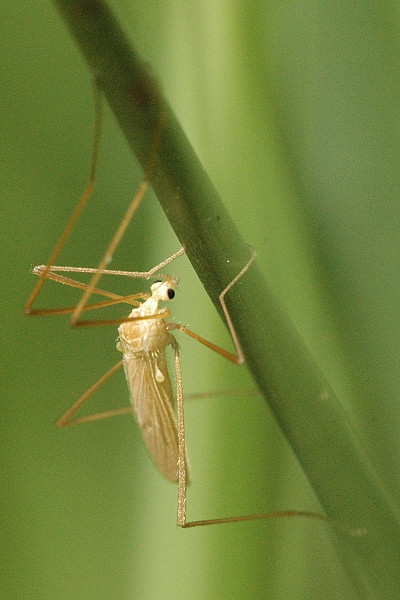
- Erioptera flavata

Scientific classification
- Kingdom: Animalia
- Phylum: Arthropoda
- Class: Insecta
- Order: Diptera
- Family: Limoniidae
- Subfamily: Chioneinae
- Tribe: Eriopterini
- Genus: Erioptera; Meigen, 1803

Type species
- Erioptera lutea Meigen, 1804

Subgenera
- Alcheringa; Ctenerioptera; Erioptera; Hespererioptera; Lepidocyphona; Mesocyphona; Meterioptera; Tasiocerodes; Teleneura; Teucherioptera; Polymeda

Synonyms
- Polymeda Meigen, 1800; Polyraphia Meigen, 1818; Polyrhaphia Agassiz, 1847; Octavia Bigot, 1854; Chemalida Rondani, 1856; Ilisophila Rondani, 1856; Limnoea Rondani, 1856; Limnoica Rondani, 1861

= Erioptera =

Genus of flies

Erioptera is a genus of crane fly in the family Limoniidae.

== Species ==
- Subgenus Alcheringa Theischinger, 1994
  - E. amabilis Alexander, 1926
- Subgenus Ctenerioptera Alexander, 1961
  - E. caledonia Alexander, 1948
  - E. derasa Edwards, 1931
  - E. ferruginea Brunetti, 1912
  - E. pectinella Alexander, 1961
  - E. sziladyi Alexander, 1934
- Subgenus Erioptera Meigen, 1803
  - E. abrasa Edwards, 1928
  - E. acucuspis Alexander, 1976
  - E. alanstonei Alexander, 1977
  - E. alboguttata Edwards, 1916
  - E. aletschina Stary, 1997
  - E. alta Alexander, 1932
  - E. andina Alexander, 1913
  - E. angolana Alexander, 1963
  - E. angusticincta Alexander, 1956
  - E. annulipes Williston, 1896
  - E. apicialba Alexander, 1921
  - E. badicincta Alexander, 1974
  - E. beckeri Kuntze, 1914
  - E. beebeana Alexander, 1950
  - E. bequaerti Alexander, 1923
  - E. biaculeata Savchenko, 1981
  - E. biarmata Alexander, 1934
  - E. biobtusa Alexander, 1956
  - E. brahma Alexander, 1966
  - E. brevirama Alexander, 1931
  - E. bryantiana Alexander, 1929
  - E. cacuminis Edwards, 1926
  - E. carior Alexander, 1920
  - E. carissima Alexander, 1920
  - E. celestissima Alexander, 1956
  - E. cervula Savchenko, 1972
  - E. chlorophylla Osten Sacken, 1860
  - E. chlorophylloides Alexander, 1919
  - E. circumambiens Alexander, 1957
  - E. cladophora Alexander, 1920
  - E. cladophoroides Alexander, 1921
  - E. connata Alexander, 1972
  - E. coolbyngga Theischinger, 1994
  - E. cornuta Savchenko, 1984
  - E. cristata Alexander, 1956
  - E. dama Alexander, 1958
  - E. dampfi Alexander, 1927
  - E. diplacantha Alexander, 1931
  - E. distinguenda Stary, 1983
  - E. divisa (Walker, 1848)
  - E. dyari Alexander, 1924
  - E. ebenina Alexander, 1926
  - E. euzona Alexander, 1970
  - E. flavata (Westhoff, 1882)
  - E. flavohumeralis Alexander, 1924
  - E. funesta Alexander, 1926
  - E. furcifer Alexander, 1919
  - E. fuscipennis Meigen, 1818
  - E. fusculenta Edwards, 1938
  - E. galbinocosta Alexander, 1960
  - E. gaspeana Alexander, 1929
  - E. genuatra Alexander, 1953
  - E. georgei Alexander, 1956
  - E. gorgona Savchenko, 1981
  - E. grandior Brunetti, 1912
  - E. griseipennis Meigen, 1838
  - E. haplostyla Alexander, 1934
  - E. himalayae Alexander, 1930
  - E. hohensis Alexander, 1949
  - E. horii Alexander, 1924
  - E. impensa Alexander, 1957
  - E. interrita Alexander, 1970
  - E. inusitata Alexander, 1976
  - E. juvenilis Alexander, 1933
  - E. karisimbii Alexander, 1956
  - E. kluaneana Alexander, 1955
  - E. laticrista Savchenko, 1977
  - E. leptostyla Alexander, 1940
  - E. leucosticta Alexander, 1933
  - E. limbata Loew, 1873
  - E. litostyla Alexander, 1966
  - E. longicauda Loew, 1871
  - E. lucerna Alexander, 1926
  - E. lunicola Alexander, 1932
  - E. lunigera Alexander, 1929
  - E. lutea Meigen, 1804
  - E. luteicornis Alexander, 1930
  - E. mediofusca Alexander, 1940
  - E. megalops Alexander, 1975
  - E. megophthalma Alexander, 1918
  - E. meijerei Edwards, 1921
  - E. micromyia Alexander, 1920
  - E. minor de Meijere, 1920
  - E. multiannulata Alexander, 1937
  - E. murudensis Edwards, 1926
  - E. nielseni de Meijere, 1921
  - E. nigripalpis de Meijere, 1913
  - E. nitidiuscula Alexander, 1920
  - E. oceanica Alexander, 1914
  - E. orbitalis Alexander, 1924
  - E. orientalis Brunetti, 1912
  - E. osceola Alexander, 1933
  - E. otayba Theischinger, 1994
  - E. palliclavata Alexander, 1936
  - E. pallidivena Alexander, 1938
  - E. parviclava Alexander, 1974
  - E. pederi Tjeder, 1969
  - E. perexquisita Alexander, 1978
  - E. peringueyi Bergroth, 1888
  - E. phoinix Savchenko, 1972
  - E. pila Alexander, 1966
  - E. polydonta Alexander, 1944
  - E. polytricha Alexander, 1945
  - E. pompalis Alexander, 1957
  - E. quadricincta Alexander, 1927
  - E. quadrihamata Savchenko, 1972
  - E. quinquecincta Alexander, 1927
  - E. rubripes Alexander, 1931
  - E. scolophora Alexander, 1973
  - E. scolostyla Alexander, 1962
  - E. seminole Alexander, 1933
  - E. septemtrionis Osten Sacken, 1860
  - E. setipennis Alexander, 1956
  - E. sexaculeata Alexander, 1940
  - E. sordida Zetterstedt, 1838
  - E. squalida Loew, 1871
  - E. straminea Osten Sacken, 1869
  - E. subchlorophylla Alexander, 1919
  - E. subfurcifer Alexander, 1929
  - E. subhalterata Alexander, 1960
  - E. subirrorata Alexander, 1920
  - E. susurra Alexander, 1945
  - E. tahanensis Edwards, 1928
  - E. tenuirama Savchenko, 1972
  - E. tordi Tjeder, 1973
  - E. transmarina Bergroth, 1889
  - E. trivittata Lindner, 1958
  - E. uliginosa Alexander, 1930
  - E. urania Alexander, 1944
  - E. verralli Edwards, 1921
  - E. vespertina Osten Sacken, 1860
  - E. villosa Osten Sacken, 1860
  - E. viridula Alexander, 1929
  - E. wellsae Theischinger, 1994
  - E. xanthoptera Alexander, 1924
  - E. yarraga Theischinger, 1994
  - E. yarto Theischinger, 1994
  - E. yukonensis Alexander, 1955
- Subgenus Hespererioptera Alexander, 1972
  - E. oregonensis Alexander, 1920
- Subgenus Lepidocyphona Alexander, 1972
  - E. rubia Alexander, 1914
- Subgenus Mesocyphona Osten Sacken, 1869
  - E. aglaia Alexander, 1945
  - E. albicapitella (Edwards, 1912)
  - E. apicinigra Alexander, 1927
  - E. bicinctipes Alexander, 1913
  - E. bievexa Alexander, 1967
  - E. bivittata (Loew, 1873)
  - E. caliptera Say, 1823
  - E. celestior Alexander, 1957
  - E. conica (Savchenko, 1972)
  - E. costalis Alexander, 1913
  - E. cynthia Alexander, 1946
  - E. diffusa Alexander, 1921
  - E. distincta Alexander, 1912
  - E. dulcis Osten Sacken, 1877
  - E. eiseni Alexander, 1913
  - E. euphrosyne Alexander, 1945
  - E. evergladea Alexander, 1933
  - E. factiosa Alexander, 1943
  - E. femoraatra Alexander, 1950
  - E. fossarum (Loew, 1873)
  - E. fuscodiscalis Alexander, 1938
  - E. gagneana Alexander, 1970
  - E. gulosa Alexander, 1943
  - E. histrio Alexander, 1945
  - E. immaculata Alexander, 1913
  - E. incurvata Alexander, 1971
  - E. inornatipes Alexander, 1925
  - E. intercepta Alexander, 1947
  - E. invariegata Alexander, 1921
  - E. iquitosensis Alexander, 1946
  - E. knabi Alexander, 1913
  - E. latilimbata Alexander, 1970
  - E. leonensis Alexander, 1946
  - E. leucopasta Alexander, 1927
  - E. lilliputina (Savchenko, 1972)
  - E. maculosa (Edwards, 1912)
  - E. melanderiana Alexander, 1946
  - E. minuta (Lackschewitz, 1940)
  - E. modica Alexander, 1927
  - E. needhami Alexander, 1918
  - E. pachyrhampha Alexander, 1967
  - E. parva Osten Sacken, 1860
  - E. portoricensis Alexander, 1933
  - E. quadrifurcata Alexander, 1928
  - E. saturata Alexander, 1927
  - E. scabrifolia Alexander, 1967
  - E. serpentina Alexander, 1941
  - E. spinifera (Savchenko, 1972)
  - E. splendida Alexander, 1913
  - E. subcynthia Alexander, 1967
  - E. subdulcis Alexander, 1937
  - E. subhistrio Alexander, 1967
  - E. surinamensis Alexander, 1947
  - E. tantilla Alexander, 1916
  - E. testacea (Lackschewitz, 1964)
  - E. thalia Alexander, 1945
  - E. triangularis Alexander, 1945
  - E. troglodyta Edwards, 1918
  - E. turrialbae Alexander, 1945
  - E. venustipes Alexander, 1926
  - E. whitei Alexander, 1930
  - E. withycombei Alexander, 1930
- Subgenus Meterioptera Alexander, 1934
  - E. ablusa Alexander, 1958
  - E. angustifascia Alexander, 1920
  - E. bengalensis Alexander, 1921
  - E. beninensis Alexander, 1976
  - E. bicornifer Alexander, 1921
  - E. dewulfi Alexander, 1956
  - E. ensifera Alexander, 1930
  - E. fervida Alexander, 1934
  - E. festiva Alexander, 1934
  - E. fumipennis Alexander, 1921
  - E. geniculata Edwards, 1931
  - E. genualis Edwards, 1934
  - E. halterata Brunetti, 1912
  - E. illingworthi Alexander, 1920
  - E. insignis Edwards, 1916
  - E. javanensis de Meijere, 1911
  - E. luzonica Alexander, 1917
  - E. nigrospica Alexander, 1976
  - E. notata de Meijere, 1911
  - E. pergracilis Alexander, 1975
  - E. persinuata Alexander, 1964
  - E. quadripilata Alexander, 1958
  - E. quadrispicata Alexander, 1949
  - E. raphidostyla Alexander, 1978
  - E. scioptera Alexander, 1956
  - E. simulans Alexander, 1926
  - E. subaurea Bergroth, 1888
  - E. thaumasta Alexander, 1950
  - E. thelema Alexander, 1962
- Subgenus Tasiocerodes Alexander, 1958
  - E. cnephosa Alexander, 1966
  - E. nepalensis Alexander, 1957
  - E. persessilis Alexander, 1958
  - E. subsessilis Alexander, 1924
- Subgenus Teleneura Alexander, 1931
  - E. acanthapophysis Alexander, 1973
  - E. annandaleana Alexander, 1953
  - E. argentifrons Edwards, 1928
  - E. ctenophora Alexander, 1966
  - E. fusca de Meijere, 1913
  - E. laetipes Alexander, 1968
  - E. leucopoda Alexander, 1932
  - E. lushaiensis Alexander, 1966
  - E. luteiclavata Alexander, 1932
  - E. melanotaenia Alexander, 1931
  - E. nebulifera Alexander, 1953
  - E. nigribasis Edwards, 1928
  - E. parallela Brunetti, 1912
  - E. pennigera Alexander, 1954
  - E. perlugubris Alexander, 1940
  - E. perornata Alexander, 1934
  - E. subfusca Edwards, 1919
- Subgenus Teucherioptera Alexander, 1972
  - E. chrysocoma Osten Sacken, 1860
  - E. chrysocomoides Alexander, 1929
- Unplaced
  - E. amamiensis Alexander, 1956
  - E. balioptera Alexander, 1966
  - E. fuscoradialis Alexander, 1950
  - E. grumula Alexander, 1957
  - E. incerta Brunetti, 1912
  - E. incompleta Senior-White, 1922
  - E. paivai Alexander, 1927
  - E. perpictula Alexander, 1931
  - E. regina Alexander, 1959
  - E. rex Alexander, 1952
  - E. rhadinostyla Alexander, 1957
  - E. rogersi Alexander, 1923
  - E. tiro Alexander, 1954
- Uncertain (these additional species may have a subgenus)
  - E. armata Osten Sacken, 1859
  - E. armillaris Osten Sacken, 1869
  - E. asiatica Alexander, 1919
  - E. bipartita Osten Sacken, 1877
  - E. bispinigera Alexander, 1930
  - E. bispinosa
  - E. bisulca Alexander, 1949
  - E. cana
  - E. carsoni Alexander, 1955
  - E. chaetophora Alexander, 1968
  - E. churchillensis Alexander, 1938
  - E. cramptonella (Alexander, 1931)
  - E. denali Alexander, 1955
  - E. dorothea Alexander, 1914
  - E. ecalcar Alexander, 1949
  - E. empedoides
  - E. estella Alexander, 1955
  - E. graphica Osten Sacken, 1859
  - E. grata Loew
  - E. hybrida (Meigen, 1804)
  - E. hygropetrica Alexander, 1943
  - E. indianensis Alexander, 1922
  - E. irata Alexander, 1949
  - E. laticeps Alexander, 1916
  - E. lucia Alexander, 1914
  - E. maria Alexander, 1948
  - E. mckinleyana Alexander, 1955
  - E. megarhabda (Alexander, 1943)
  - E. microcellula Alexander, 1914
  - E. neomexicana Alexander, 1929
  - E. nitida
  - E. novaezemblae
  - E. nubilosa Alexander, 1956
  - E. octobris Gavryushin, 2011
  - E. palomarica
  - E. pauliani Seguy, 1960
  - E. peayi Alexander, 1948
  - E. pilipes
  - E. platymera Alexander, 1968
  - E. polycantha Alexander, 1945
  - E. rainieria Alexander, 1943
  - E. recurva Alexander, 1949
  - E. sheldoni Alexander, 1955
  - E. shoshone Alexander, 1945
  - E. sinawava Alexander, 1948
  - E. sparsa Alexander, 1919
  - E. squamosa
  - E. stictica Meigen
  - E. sunwapta Alexander, 1952
  - E. sweetmani Alexander, 1940
  - E. telfordi Alexander, 1948
  - E. tripartita
  - E. venusta Osten Sacken, 1859
  - E. zukeli Alexander, 1940
