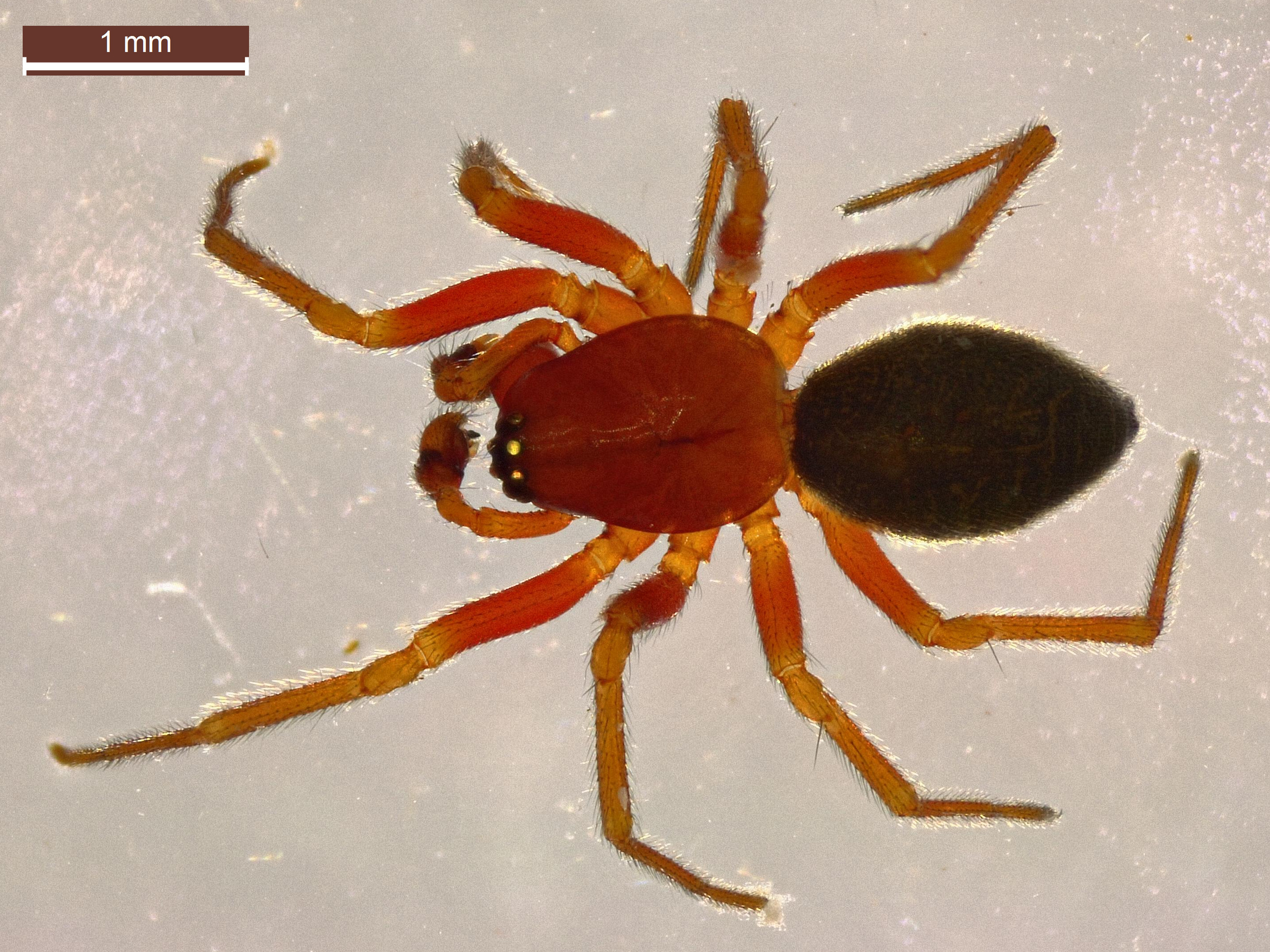

Scientific classification
- Domain: Eukaryota
- Kingdom: Animalia
- Phylum: Arthropoda
- Subphylum: Chelicerata
- Class: Arachnida
- Order: Araneae
- Infraorder: Araneomorphae
- Family: Linyphiidae
- Genus: Hylyphantes
- Species: H. graminicola

Binomial name
- Hylyphantes graminicola (Sundevall, 1830)

Synonyms
- Linyphia graminicola Theridion rubripes Micryphantes rubripes Argus graminicolis Erigone graminicola Neriene graminicola Erigone dentifera Tmeticus graminicolus Gongylidium deniferum Gongylidium graminicola Tmeticus graminicola Erigonidium graminicolum Erigone hua Erigonides graminicola Erigone orientalis Erigone tonkina Erigonidium graminicola Tmeticus yunnanensis

= Hylyphantes graminicola =

Species of spider

Hylyphantes graminicola is a small linyphiid spider with palaearctic distribution. It is one of the most important natural enemies of different pests in farmland and forests in Asia. In cotton fields, it was found to build a small web between clods of young plants, and to live on branches when the plant gets bigger. Up to 30 individuals per square meter were found in cotton fields of northern China.

== Name ==
The species name graminicola is Latin for "dwelling in grass".
