= Hexatoma bengalensis =

Scientific classification
- Kingdom: Animalia
- Phylum: Arthropoda
- Class: Insecta
- Order: Diptera
- Family: Limoniidae
- Genus: Hexatoma
- Species: H. bengalensis

Binomial name
- Hexatoma bengalensis Alexander, 1933

Species of fly

Hexatoma bengalensis is a species of crane fly in the family Limoniidae.

This species is found in:

- Bangladesh
- India

No subspecies are listed for it.
