= Hexatoma brevioricornis =

Scientific classification
- Kingdom: Animalia
- Phylum: Arthropoda
- Class: Insecta
- Order: Diptera
- Family: Limoniidae
- Genus: Hexatoma
- Species: H. brevioricornis

Binomial name
- Hexatoma brevioricornis Alexander, 1941

Species of fly

Hexatoma brevioricornis is a species of limoniid crane fly in the family Limoniidae.
