= Hexatoma brachycera =

Scientific classification
- Domain: Eukaryota
- Kingdom: Animalia
- Phylum: Arthropoda
- Class: Insecta
- Order: Diptera
- Family: Limoniidae
- Genus: Hexatoma
- Species: H. brachycera

Binomial name
- Hexatoma brachycera (Osten Sacken, 1877)

Synonyms
- Eriocera brachycera Osten Sacken, 1877

Species of fly

Hexatoma brachycera is a species of limoniid crane flies in the family Limoniidae.
