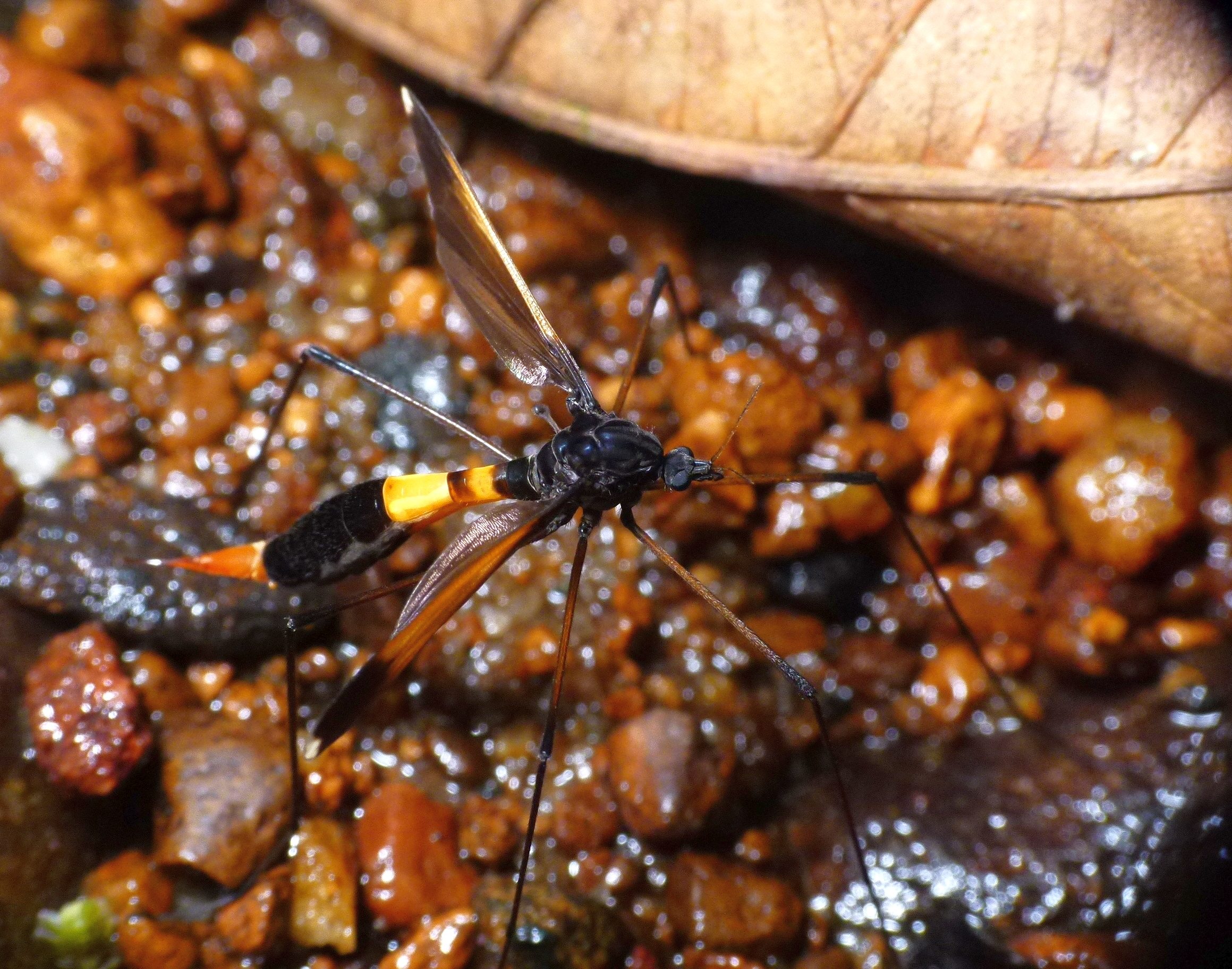
- Hexatoma sp. from the Western Ghats

Scientific classification
- Kingdom: Animalia
- Phylum: Arthropoda
- Class: Insecta
- Order: Diptera
- Family: Limoniidae
- Subfamily: Limnophilinae
- Genus: Hexatoma; Latreille, 1809

Type species
- Hexatoma nigra Latreille, 1809

Subgenera
- Cladolipes Loew, 1865; Coreozelia Enderlein, 1936; Eriocera Macquart, 1838; Euhexatoma Alexander, 1936; Hexatoma Latreille, 1809; Parahexatoma Alexander, 1951

Synonyms
- Nematocera Meigen, 1818; Anisomera Meigen, 1818; Peronecera Curtis, 1836; Trimacromera Enderlein, 1936

= Hexatoma =

Genus of flies

Hexatoma is a genus of crane flies in the family Limoniidae.

== Species ==
- Subgenus Cladolipes Loew, 1865

- H. cisatlantica Alexander, 1937
- H. haiasana (Savchenko, 1972)
- H. simplex (Loew, 1865)

- Subgenus Coreozelia Enderlein, 1936

- H. cimicoides (Scopoli, 1763)

- Subgenus Eriocera Macquart, 1838

- H. abdominalis (Alexander, 1923)
- H. absona Alexander, 1949
- H. acrostacta (Wiedemann, 1821)
- H. acunai (Alexander, 1928)
- H. aegle Alexander, 1953
- H. aequinigra Alexander, 1934
- H. aetherea (Alexander, 1916)
- H. aglaia Alexander, 1946
- H. agni Alexander, 1963
- H. aitkeni Alexander, 1966
- H. albifrons (Edwards, 1928)
- H. albihirta (Alexander, 1912)
- H. albiprivata (Edwards, 1932)
- H. albipunctata (van der Wulp, 1880)
- H. albitarsis (Osten Sacken, 1869)
- H. alboguttata (Matsumura, 1916)
- H. albomedia (Edwards, 1932)
- H. albonotata (Loew, 1852)
- H. albovittata (Edwards, 1928)
- H. amazonicola (Alexander, 1920)
- H. ambrosia Alexander, 1938
- H. anamalaiana Alexander, 1949
- H. andicola (Alexander, 1923)
- H. angustipennis (Enderlein, 1912)
- H. angustissima (Alexander, 1927)
- H. antennata (Alexander, 1930)
- H. aperta (Alexander, 1920)
- H. apoensis Alexander, 1961
- H. arcuaria Alexander, 1974
- H. arcuata Alexander, 1951
- H. argentina (Alexander, 1919)
- H. argyrocephala Alexander, 1937
- H. arrogans (Alexander, 1927)
- H. artifex Alexander, 1961
- H. assamensis (Edwards, 1921)
- H. aterrima (Walker, 1856)
- H. aterrima (Brunetti, 1912)
- H. atra (Doleschall, 1859)
- H. atricornis Alexander, 1934
- H. atripes Alexander, 1934
- H. atrisoma Alexander, 1937
- H. atroantica Alexander, 1957
- H. atrodorsalis (Alexander, 1927)
- H. atromarginata (Edwards, 1926)
- H. atrosignata Alexander, 1942
- H. aurantia (Brunetti, 1918)
- H. aurantionota Alexander, 1939
- H. aurata (Doane, 1900)
- H. austera (Doane, 1900)
- H. australiensis (Alexander, 1920)
- H. azrael Alexander, 1943
- H. azurea Alexander, 1938
- H. badia (Brunetti, 1911)
- H. basilaris (Wiedemann, 1821)
- H. batesi (Alexander, 1921)
- H. bazini (Edwards, 1926)
- H. beameri Alexander, 1956
- H. beebeana Alexander, 1950
- H. bengalensis Alexander, 1933
- H. bequaertiana Alexander, 1938
- H. bevisi Alexander, 1956
- H. bifascipennis (Edwards, 1932)
- H. bifenestrata Alexander, 1938
- H. biflava (Edwards, 1928)
- H. biflavocincta Alexander, 1971
- H. bifurcata Alexander, 1947
- H. biguttipennis (Edwards, 1932)
- H. bituberculata (Macquart, 1838)
- H. boettcheri (Edwards, 1926)
- H. borneana (Edwards, 1921)
- H. brachycera (Osten Sacken, 1877)
- H. braconides (Enderlein, 1912)
- H. brevifurca Alexander, 1956
- H. brevioricornis Alexander, 1941
- H. brevipila (Alexander, 1918)
- H. breviuscula (Alexander, 1929)
- H. bruneri (Alexander, 1928)
- H. brunettii (Edwards, 1921)
- H. brunneipes (Williston, 1900)
- H. cabralensis Alexander, 1945
- H. caesarea (Alexander, 1931)
- H. caesia Savchenko, 1979
- H. californica (Osten Sacken, 1877)
- H. caliginosa (Brunetti, 1918)
- H. caminaria (Wiedemann, 1828)
- H. candidipes (Alexander, 1923)
- H. canescens Alexander, 1949
- H. caninota Alexander, 1937
- H. cantonensis Alexander, 1938
- H. capensis (Alexander, 1921)
- H. captiosa Alexander, 1946
- H. carbonipes (Alexander, 1929)
- H. carinivertex Alexander, 1949
- H. carrerai Alexander, 1942
- H. celebesiana Alexander, 1944
- H. celestia Alexander, 1938
- H. celestissima Alexander, 1949
- H. cerberus Alexander, 1953
- H. ceroxantha Alexander, 1971
- H. chalybeicincta (Alexander, 1922)
- H. chalybeiventris Alexander, 1949
- H. chaseni (Edwards, 1932)
- H. chirothecata (Scopoli, 1763)
- H. chrysomela (Edwards, 1921)
- H. chrysoptera (Walker, 1856)
- H. chrysopteroides (Alexander, 1922)
- H. cincta (Brunetti, 1918)
- H. cinerea (Alexander, 1912)
- H. cinereicauda (Edwards, 1926)
- H. cinereithorax (Alexander, 1925)
- H. cingulata (de Meijere, 1911)
- H. citrina Alexander, 1965
- H. cleopatra Alexander, 1933
- H. coheri Alexander, 1957
- H. columbiana (Alexander, 1919)
- H. combinata (Walker, 1856)
- H. commoda Alexander, 1937
- H. commutabilis (Alexander, 1923)
- H. conjuncta (Alexander, 1914)
- H. constricta Alexander, 1934
- H. coomani Alexander, 1941
- H. cornigera (Alexander, 1914)
- H. coroicoensis Alexander, 1962
- H. cramptoni (Alexander, 1928)
- H. crassipes (Bezzi, 1916)
- H. crystalloptera (Osten Sacken, 1888)
- H. ctenophoroides (Edwards, 1911)
- H. cubensis (Alexander, 1926)
- H. cybele (Alexander, 1927)
- H. davidi (Alexander, 1923)
- H. dayana Alexander, 1959
- H. decorata (Brunetti, 1918)
- H. denotata (Edwards, 1926)
- H. dharma Alexander, 1955
- H. diana (Macquart, 1834)
- H. dichroa (Walker, 1856)
- H. diengensis (Alexander, 1931)
- H. dignitosa (Alexander, 1932)
- H. dileuca (Edwards, 1928)
- H. diploneura Alexander, 1934
- H. disjuncta Alexander, 1938
- H. disparilis (Edwards, 1932)
- H. domingensis (Alexander, 1916)
- H. dorothea Alexander, 1956
- H. ducalis (Edwards, 1932)
- H. dysantes Alexander, 1951
- H. elevata Alexander, 1945
- H. elongatissima (Brunetti, 1912)
- H. enavata Alexander, 1938
- H. eos Alexander, 1949
- H. eriophora (Williston, 1893)
- H. erythraea (Osten Sacken, 1886)
- H. esmeralda Alexander, 1952
- H. euryxantha Alexander, 1971
- H. evanescens (Alexander, 1921)
- H. exquisita (Alexander, 1914)
- H. farriana Alexander, 1964
- H. fasciata (Guerin-Meneville, 1831)
- H. fenestrata (Brunetti, 1911)
- H. ferax Alexander, 1937
- H. ferruginosa (van der Wulp, 1885)
- H. flammeinota (Alexander, 1930)
- H. flammeipennis Alexander, 1942
- H. flaviceps (Wiedemann, 1828)
- H. flavicosta (Edwards, 1921)
- H. flavida (Williston, 1900)
- H. flavidibasis (Alexander, 1929)
- H. flavimarginata (Yang, 1999)
- H. flavipes (Brunetti, 1912)
- H. flavitarsis (Edwards, 1928)
- H. flavocincta (Alexander, 1920)
- H. flavohirta Alexander, 1937
- H. fracida Alexander, 1949
- H. fuliginosa (Osten Sacken, 1860)
- H. fultonensis (Alexander, 1912)
- H. fulvibasis (Alexander, 1923)
- H. fulvithorax Alexander, 1967
- H. fulvoapicalis Alexander, 1957
- H. fulvomedia Alexander, 1956
- H. fumidipennis (Alexander, 1927)
- H. furtiva Alexander, 1961
- H. fusca (Edwards, 1911)
- H. fuscinervis (Edwards, 1912)
- H. gamma (Enderlein, 1912)
- H. gaspensis (Alexander, 1931)
- H. geminata (Alexander, 1923)
- H. gibbosa (Doane, 1900)
- H. gifuensis Alexander, 1933
- H. glabricornis Alexander, 1969
- H. glabrivittata (Alexander, 1929)
- H. globiceps (Alexander, 1920)
- H. glomerosa Alexander, 1960
- H. gnava Alexander, 1961
- H. gomesiana Alexander, 1945
- H. goyazensis Alexander, 1940
- H. gracilis (Osten Sacken, 1886)
- H. grahami (Alexander, 1927)
- H. gravelyi (Brunetti, 1918)
- H. greenii (Brunetti, 1911)
- H. gressittiana Alexander, 1943
- H. grisea (Riedel, 1914)
- H. griseicollis (Edwards, 1926)
- H. haemorrhoa (Osten Sacken, 1886)
- H. halteralis (Edwards, 1932)
- H. hargreavesi Alexander, 1937
- H. helophila (Alexander, 1921)
- H. hemicera (Alexander, 1933)
- H. hendersoni (Edwards, 1928)
- H. hilpa (Walker, 1848)
- H. hilpoides (Alexander, 1923)
- H. hirtithorax Alexander, 1936
- H. hoffmanni Alexander, 1938
- H. homochroa Alexander, 1963
- H. humberti (Osten Sacken, 1888)
- H. humilis (Alexander, 1921)
- H. imperator Alexander, 1953
- H. indecora Alexander, 1937
- H. indra Alexander, 1955
- H. infixa (Walker, 1856)
- H. insidiosa Alexander, 1938
- H. interlineata Alexander, 1934
- H. intermedia (Alexander, 1927)
- H. interstitialis Alexander, 1937
- H. intrita Alexander, 1943
- H. iriomotensis Alexander, 1935
- H. ishigakiensis Alexander, 1935
- H. issikii (Alexander, 1928)
- H. jacobsoni (Alexander, 1927)
- H. javensis (Doleschall, 1857)
- H. jocularis Alexander, 1948
- H. jozana (Alexander, 1924)
- H. juliana Alexander, 1937
- H. jurata Alexander, 1936
- H. juxta Alexander, 1938
- H. kaieturensis (Alexander, 1914)
- H. kala Alexander, 1962
- H. kamiyai (Alexander, 1932)
- H. kariyai Alexander, 1933
- H. karma Alexander, 1962
- H. karnyi (Edwards, 1925)
- H. kelloggi (Alexander, 1932)
- H. kempi (Brunetti, 1918)
- H. kiangsuana Alexander, 1938
- H. klapperichiana Alexander, 1957
- H. klossi (Edwards, 1919)
- H. kolthoffi Alexander, 1937
- H. laddeyi Alexander, 1942
- H. laetipes Alexander, 1955
- H. lamonganensis (Alexander, 1931)
- H. lanigera Alexander, 1933
- H. larutensis (Edwards, 1932)
- H. laticostata Alexander, 1937
- H. latigrisea Alexander, 1971
- H. latissima (Alexander, 1922)
- H. lativentris (Bezzi, 1916)
- H. leonensis (Alexander, 1920)
- H. lessepsi (Osten Sacken, 1886)
- H. leucotela (Walker, 1856)
- H. licens Alexander, 1942
- H. longeantennata (Lackschewitz, 1964)
- H. longicornis (Walker, 1848)
- H. longifurca (Alexander, 1920)
- H. longipennis (Alexander, 1923)
- H. longiradius Alexander, 1938
- H. longisector Alexander, 1961
- H. longistyla (Alexander, 1913)
- H. lopesi Alexander, 1942
- H. lunata (Westwood, 1881)
- H. lunigera (Walker, 1856)
- H. luteicolor Alexander, 1968
- H. luteicostalis Alexander, 1933
- H. luteitarsis Alexander, 1964
- H. luxuriosa Alexander, 1936
- H. lygropis (Alexander, 1920)
- H. macquarti (Enderlein, 1912)
- H. macrocera (Alexander, 1914)
- H. madagascariensis Alexander, 1933
- H. maesta (Edwards, 1926)
- H. magistra Alexander, 1942
- H. magnifica (Alexander, 1914)
- H. malangensis Alexander, 1934
- H. maldonadoi Alexander, 1953
- H. malevolens Alexander, 1937
- H. manabiana Alexander, 1942
- H. mansueta (Osten Sacken, 1882)
- H. margaritae Alexander, 1954
- H. mariposa Alexander, 1943
- H. masakii Alexander, 1934
- H. mediofila Alexander, 1933
- H. melanacra (Wiedemann, 1828)
- H. melanolitha (Alexander, 1927)
- H. melanonota Alexander, 1968
- H. meleagris (Osten Sacken, 1888)
- H. melina (Alexander, 1922)
- H. mesopyrrha (Wiedemann, 1828)
- H. mesoxantha (Osten Sacken, 1886)
- H. metallica (Schiner, 1868)
- H. mikirensis Alexander, 1963
- H. mindanaoensis (Alexander, 1922)
- H. minensis Alexander, 1934
- H. miranda Alexander, 1938
- H. mitra Alexander, 1962
- H. monoleuca Alexander, 1938
- H. monroviae (Alexander, 1930)
- H. moriokana (Matsumura, 1916)
- H. morosa (Osten Sacken, 1881)
- H. morula (Alexander, 1923)
- H. muiri (Alexander, 1923)
- H. multicolor Alexander, 1937
- H. multiguttula Alexander, 1939
- H. murudensis (Edwards, 1926)
- H. mutica (Edwards, 1928)
- H. myrtea (Alexander, 1922)
- H. neognava Alexander, 1971
- H. neopaenulata Alexander, 1957
- H. neosaga Alexander, 1947
- H. nepalensis (Westwood, 1836)
- H. nigerrima (Brunetti, 1912)
- H. nigricans (Edwards, 1927)
- H. nigrina (Riedel, 1913)
- H. nigripennis (van der Wulp, 1904)
- H. nigroantica Alexander, 1957
- H. nigrochalybea (Alexander, 1922)
- H. nigrocoxata Alexander, 1957
- H. nigronotata (Alexander, 1931)
- H. nigrotrochanterata (Alexander, 1932)
- H. nimbipennis Alexander, 1938
- H. nipponensis (Alexander, 1918)
- H. nitidiventris (Edwards, 1926)
- H. nitidula (Edwards, 1928)
- H. novella Alexander, 1937
- H. nudivena Alexander, 1933
- H. nyasicola (Alexander, 1920)
- H. obliqua (Alexander, 1923)
- H. obscuripennis (Edwards, 1912)
- H. obsoleta (Williston, 1900)
- H. ocellifera (Alexander, 1915)
- H. ochripleuris (Edwards, 1927)
- H. ogloblini Alexander, 1935
- H. ohausiana (Enderlein, 1912)
- H. omanensis Hancock, 1997
- H. omeiana Alexander, 1933
- H. optabilis (Walker, 1856)
- H. opulenta Alexander, 1951
- H. orbiculata (Edwards, 1926)
- H. ornata (Enderlein, 1912)
- H. ornaticornis Alexander, 1939
- H. pachyrrhina (Osten Sacken, 1888)
- H. pachyrrhinoides (Edwards, 1927)
- H. pacifica Alexander, 1956
- H. paenulata (Enderlein, 1912)
- H. paenulatoides Alexander, 1949
- H. pallidipes (Alexander, 1926)
- H. palomarensis Alexander, 1947
- H. pannosa (Enderlein, 1912)
- H. paragnava Alexander, 1973
- H. patens Alexander, 1938
- H. pendleburyi (Edwards, 1928)
- H. pennata Alexander, 1962
- H. perdecora (Alexander, 1914)
- H. perelongata Alexander, 1969
- H. perenensis (Alexander, 1923)
- H. perennis (Osten Sacken, 1882)
- H. perexigua Alexander, 1942
- H. perfestiva Alexander, 1951
- H. perhirsuta Alexander, 1973
- H. perlaeta (Alexander, 1922)
- H. perlongata Alexander, 1961
- H. perlunata Alexander, 1938
- H. pernigrina Alexander, 1938
- H. perornata Alexander, 1938
- H. perpulchra (Alexander, 1914)
- H. perrara Alexander, 1936
- H. peruviana (Alexander, 1914)
- H. perversa Alexander, 1937
- H. pervia Alexander, 1966
- H. phaeton Alexander, 1961
- H. piatrix Alexander, 1942
- H. pieli Alexander, 1937
- H. pieliana Alexander, 1940
- H. platysoma (Alexander, 1930)
- H. plaumanni Alexander, 1937
- H. plecioides (Walker, 1856)
- H. pleskei Alexander, 1933
- H. plumbeicolor Alexander, 1942
- H. plumbeinota Alexander, 1940
- H. plumbicincta (Brunetti, 1911)
- H. plumbolutea (Edwards, 1921)
- H. plutonis Alexander, 1937
- H. politovertex Alexander, 1950
- H. posticata Alexander, 1937
- H. praelata (Alexander, 1923)
- H. preposita Alexander, 1956
- H. pretiosa (Osten Sacken, 1886)
- H. prolixa Alexander, 1961
- H. propinquua Alexander, 1936
- H. pterotricha Alexander, 1940
- H. pulchripes (Alexander, 1922)
- H. pulchrithorax (Brunetti, 1918)
- H. pullatipes Alexander, 1951
- H. punctigera (Edwards, 1928)
- H. purpurata Alexander, 1949
- H. pusilla (Alexander, 1920)
- H. pusilloides Alexander, 1955
- H. pyrrhochroma (Walker, 1856)
- H. pyrrhomesa (Edwards, 1919)
- H. pyrrhopyga Alexander, 1933
- H. quadriatrata Alexander, 1937
- H. quadriaurantia Alexander, 1950
- H. rama Alexander, 1955
- H. regina Alexander, 1937
- H. retrograda Alexander, 1953
- H. reverentia Alexander, 1949
- H. robinsoni (Edwards, 1921)
- H. roraimella Alexander, 1935
- H. rossiana Alexander, 1961
- H. rubrescens (Walker, 1856)
- H. rubriceps (Edwards, 1916)
- H. rubrinota (Alexander, 1918)
- H. rudra Alexander, 1963
- H. ruficauda (Edwards, 1931)
- H. ruficornis (Macquart, 1838)
- H. rufipennis (Alexander, 1925)
- H. rufiventris (Brunetti, 1918)
- H. rufoantica Alexander, 1965
- H. rupununi Alexander, 1945
- H. sachalinensis (Alexander, 1924)
- H. saga Alexander, 1940
- H. salakensis (Edwards, 1925)
- H. sanctaemartae (Alexander, 1919)
- H. saturata (Alexander, 1919)
- H. sauteriana (Enderlein, 1912)
- H. scalator Alexander, 1938
- H. schauseana Alexander, 1967
- H. schildeana Alexander, 1967
- H. schineri (Alexander, 1922)
- H. schnusei (Kuntze, 1913)
- H. sculleni Alexander, 1943
- H. sculleniana Alexander, 1965
- H. scutellata (Edwards, 1911)
- H. seimundi (Edwards, 1928)
- H. selene (Osten Sacken, 1881)
- H. semilimpida (Brunetti, 1911)
- H. semilunata Alexander, 1937
- H. semirufa (Alexander, 1927)
- H. serena Alexander, 1961
- H. serendib Alexander, 1958
- H. setifera (Alexander, 1931)
- H. setigera Alexander, 1962
- H. setivena Alexander, 1975
- H. setosivena Alexander, 1978
- H. shawanoensis Alexander, 1959
- H. shirakii (Edwards, 1921)
- H. simalurensis (de Meijere, 1916)
- H. sincera Alexander, 1942
- H. sinensis (Edwards, 1921)
- H. solor Alexander, 1943
- H. spatulata (Alexander, 1925)
- H. speciosa (Alexander, 1914)
- H. spinosa (Osten Sacken, 1860)
- H. stackelbergi Alexander, 1933
- H. stolida Alexander, 1934
- H. stricklandi (Edwards, 1921)
- H. subaurantia Alexander, 1937
- H. subcandidipes Alexander, 1979
- H. suberecta Alexander, 1949
- H. subgracilis Alexander, 1939
- H. sublima (Alexander, 1914)
- H. sublunigera Alexander, 1937
- H. submorosa (Alexander, 1923)
- H. subnitens (Edwards, 1927)
- H. subocellata Alexander, 1964
- H. subpaenulata (Edwards, 1926)
- H. subpusilla Alexander, 1933
- H. subrectangularis (Alexander, 1924)
- H. subsaga Alexander, 1942
- H. substolida Alexander, 1939
- H. sumatrensis (Macquart, 1850)
- H. superba Savchenko, 1976
- H. susainathani Alexander, 1949
- H. sycophanta Alexander, 1937
- H. tacita Alexander, 1951
- H. taenioptera (Wiedemann, 1828)
- H. tahanensis (Edwards, 1928)
- H. tenebrosa (Walker, 1856)
- H. tenuis (Brunetti, 1912)
- H. terebrella Alexander, 1960
- H. terebrina Alexander, 1960
- H. terryi (Alexander, 1923)
- H. testacea (Brunetti, 1912)
- H. thaiensis Alexander, 1953
- H. thaiicola Alexander, 1957
- H. tholopa (Alexander, 1931)
- H. tibetana Alexander, 1933
- H. timorensis Alexander, 1936
- H. tinkhami Alexander, 1938
- H. toi Alexander, 1938
- H. tonkinensis Alexander, 1941
- H. townsendi (Alexander, 1914)
- H. toxopei Alexander, 1937
- H. tranquilla (Alexander, 1922)
- H. trialbosignata Alexander, 1942
- H. triangularis (Brunetti, 1912)
- H. trichoneura Alexander, 1956
- H. tricolor (Edwards, 1932)
- H. trifasciata (von Roder, 1885)
- H. triflava Alexander, 1963
- H. trimaculata (Edwards, 1921)
- H. tripunctipennis (Brunetti, 1918)
- H. tristis (Alexander, 1914)
- H. tuberculata Alexander, 1936
- H. tuberculifera (Edwards, 1911)
- H. tumidiscapa (Alexander, 1920)
- H. umbripennis (Edwards, 1921)
- H. unicolor (de Meijere, 1914)
- H. uniflava Alexander, 1969
- H. unimaculata (Edwards, 1931)
- H. urania Alexander, 1949
- H. ussuriensis Alexander, 1934
- H. vamana Alexander, 1961
- H. variegata Alexander, 1936
- H. velveta (Doane, 1900)
- H. venavitta Alexander, 1940
- H. verticalis (Wiedemann, 1828)
- H. vidua Alexander, 1937
- H. villosa (Edwards, 1932)
- H. virgulativentris (Enderlein, 1912)
- H. viridivittata Alexander, 1938
- H. vittinervis Alexander, 1936
- H. vittipennis (Alexander, 1922)
- H. vittula (Alexander, 1932)
- H. vulcan Alexander, 1960
- H. vulpes Alexander, 1961
- H. walayarensis Alexander, 1951
- H. weberi Alexander, 1951
- H. wiedemanni Alexander, 1933
- H. williamsoni (Alexander, 1923)
- H. willistoni (Alexander, 1913)
- H. wilsonii (Osten Sacken, 1869)
- H. xanthopoda Alexander, 1971
- H. xanthopyga (de Meijere, 1914)
- H. yerburyi (Edwards, 1921)
- H. zonata (Osten Sacken, 1886)

- Subgenus Euhexatoma Alexander, 1936

- H. triphragma Alexander, 1936

- Subgenus Hexatoma Latreille, 1809

- H. baluchistanica Alexander, 1957
- H. bicolor (Meigen, 1818)
- H. brevistigma Alexander, 1953
- H. fuscipennis (Curtis, 1836)
- H. gaedii (Meigen, 1830)
- H. hartmani Hynes, 1986
- H. japonica Alexander, 1922
- H. khasiensis Alexander, 1962
- H. kiangsiana Alexander, 1937
- H. kinnara Alexander, 1963
- H. madrasensis Alexander, 1961
- H. mediocornis Alexander, 1943
- H. megacera (Osten Sacken, 1860)
- H. microcera Alexander, 1926
- H. microstoma Edwards, 1928
- H. nigra Latreille, 1809
- H. nubeculosa (Burmeister, 1829)
- H. obscura (Meigen, 1818)
- H. perproducta Alexander, 1958
- H. prolixicornis Alexander, 1943
- H. schmidiana Alexander, 1957
- H. seticornis Alexander, 1949
- H. vittata (Meigen, 1830)

- Subgenus Parahexatoma Alexander, 1951

- H. angustatra Alexander, 1963
- H. aurantivertex Alexander, 1963
- H. beieri Alexander, 1970
- H. decurvata Alexander, 1937
- H. ferruginea (Edwards, 1912)
- H. lambertoni Alexander, 1951
- H. luteipennis (Edwards, 1912)
- H. memnon Alexander, 1965
- H. nigrivertex Alexander, 1958
- H. pauliani Alexander, 1951
- H. rubrivertex Alexander, 1955
- H. teresiae Alexander, 1960
