= Hexatoma longicornis =

Scientific classification
- Kingdom: Animalia
- Phylum: Arthropoda
- Class: Insecta
- Order: Diptera
- Family: Limoniidae
- Genus: Hexatoma
- Species: H. longicornis

Binomial name
- Hexatoma longicornis (Walker, 1848)

Synonyms
- Anisomera longicornis Walker, 1848

Species of insect

Hexatoma longicornis is a species of limoniid crane fly in the family Limoniidae.
