= Hexatoma spinosa =

Scientific classification
- Domain: Eukaryota
- Kingdom: Animalia
- Phylum: Arthropoda
- Class: Insecta
- Order: Diptera
- Family: Limoniidae
- Genus: Hexatoma
- Species: H. spinosa

Binomial name
- Hexatoma spinosa (Osten Sacken, 1859)

Synonyms
- Arrhenica spinosa Osten Sacken, 1859

Species of fly

Hexatoma spinosa is a species of limoniid crane fly in the family Limoniidae.
