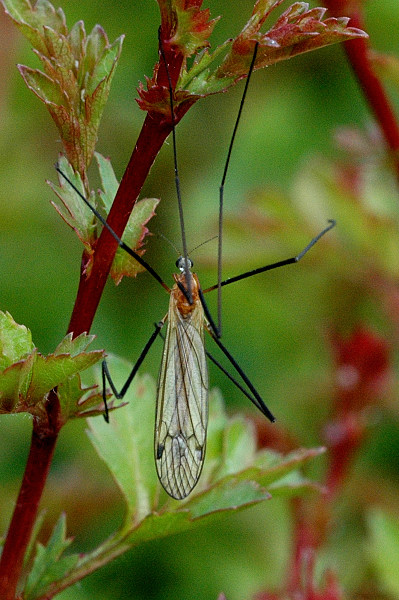
- Austrolimnophila ochracea

Scientific classification
- Kingdom: Animalia
- Phylum: Arthropoda
- Clade: Pancrustacea
- Class: Insecta
- Order: Diptera
- Family: Limoniidae
- Genus: Austrolimnophila
- Subgenus: Austrolimnophila; Alexander, 1920

Type species
- Limnophila eutaeniata Bigot, 1888

Species
- See text

Synonyms
- Polymoria authors

= Austrolimnophila (subgenus) =

Subgenus of insects

Austrolimnophila is a subgenus of crane fly in the family Limoniidae.

== Species ==
- A. acanthophallus Alexander, 1955
- A. accola Alexander, 1961
- A. acutergata Alexander, 1939
- A. agathicola Alexander, 1952
- A. agma Alexander, 1972
- A. aka Theischinger, 2000
- A. amatrix Alexander, 1960
- A. analis (Santos Abreu, 1923)
- A. anjouanensis Alexander, 1979
- A. antiqua (Skuse, 1890)
- A. argus (Hutton, 1900)
- A. asiatica (Alexander, 1925)
- A. aspidophora Alexander, 1955
- A. atripes (Alexander, 1922)
- A. autumnalis (Alexander, 1929)
- A. badia (Doane, 1900)
- A. bifidaria Alexander, 1942
- A. birungana (Alexander, 1924)
- A. bradleyi Alexander, 1929
- A. brevicellula Stary, 1977
- A. bulbulifera Alexander, 1948
- A. buxtoni Alexander, 1956
- A. byersiana Alexander, 1968
- A. candiditarsis Alexander, 1937
- A. canuta Alexander, 1958
- A. caparaoensis Alexander, 1944
- A. chiloeana Alexander, 1953
- A. chrysorrhoea (Edwards, 1923)
- A. claduroneura (Speiser, 1909)
- A. claduroneurodes Alexander, 1956
- A. collessiana Theischinger, 1996
- A. comantis Alexander, 1948
- A. crassipes (Hutton, 1900)
- A. croceipennis Alexander, 1962
- A. cyatheti (Edwards, 1923)
- A. cyclopica Alexander, 1947
- A. danbulla Theischinger, 1996
- A. deltoides Alexander, 1960
- A. diacanthophora Alexander, 1962
- A. diffusa (Alexander, 1920)
- A. discoboloides Alexander, 1947
- A. dislocata Alexander, 1961
- A. distigma (Alexander, 1920)
- A. duseni (Alexander, 1920)
- A. echidna Alexander, 1956
- A. elnora Alexander, 1929
- A. ephippigera Alexander, 1946
- A. erecta (Alexander, 1934)
- A. eucharis Alexander, 1962
- A. eutaeniata (Bigot, 1888)
- A. excelsior Alexander, 1960
- A. exsanguis Alexander, 1955
- A. fluxa Alexander, 1936
- A. fulvipennis (Alexander, 1921)
- A. fuscohalterata Alexander, 1929
- A. geographica (Hutton, 1900)
- A. griseiceps (Alexander, 1921)
- A. hausa Alexander, 1974
- A. hazelae Alexander, 1929
- A. hoogstraali Alexander, 1972
- A. horii (Alexander, 1925)
- A. illustris (Alexander, 1923)
- A. infidelis Alexander, 1929
- A. interjecta Alexander, 1936
- A. interventa (Skuse, 1890)
- A. iris Alexander, 1929
- A. irwinsmithae Alexander, 1937
- A. japenensis Alexander, 1947
- A. joana Alexander, 1929
- A. jobiensis Alexander, 1947
- A. kirishimensis (Alexander, 1925)
- A. laetabunda Alexander, 1960
- A. lambi (Edwards, 1923)
- A. latistyla Stary, 1977
- A. leleupi Alexander, 1962
- A. leucomelas (Edwards, 1923)
- A. lewisiana Theischinger, 1996
- A. linae Alexander, 1947
- A. lobophora Alexander, 1960
- A. luteipleura Alexander, 1949
- A. macrophallus Alexander, 1958
- A. macropyga Alexander, 1953
- A. mannheimsi Alexander, 1960
- A. marcida (Alexander, 1924)
- A. marshalli (Hutton, 1900)
- A. martinezi Alexander, 1957
- A. medialis (Alexander, 1921)
- A. megapophysis Alexander, 1979
- A. merklei Alexander, 1928
- A. michaelseni Alexander, 1929
- A. microspilota Alexander, 1943
- A. microsticta Alexander, 1929
- A. minor Alexander, 1962
- A. mobilis (Alexander, 1934)
- A. multiscripta Alexander, 1960
- A. multitergata Alexander, 1962
- A. munifica Alexander, 1928
- A. nahuelicola Alexander, 1957
- A. natalensis (Alexander, 1921)
- A. nebrias Alexander, 1962
- A. neuquenensis Alexander, 1952
- A. nigrocincta (Edwards, 1923)
- A. nokonis (Alexander, 1928)
- A. norrisiana Theischinger, 1996
- A. nympha Alexander, 1943
- A. obliquata (Alexander, 1922)
- A. ochracea (Meigen, 1804)
- A. oculata (Edwards, 1923)
- A. oroensis Alexander, 1943
- A. orthia (Alexander, 1924)
- A. pacifera Alexander, 1937
- A. pallidistyla Alexander, 1942
- A. percara Alexander, 1957
- A. percincta Alexander, 1955
- A. peremarginata Alexander, 1955
- A. persessilis Alexander, 1939
- A. petasma Alexander, 1961
- A. phantasma Alexander, 1956
- A. platensis (Alexander, 1923)
- A. platyterga Alexander, 1958
- A. pleurolineata Alexander, 1957
- A. pleurostria Alexander, 1958
- A. plumbeipleura Alexander, 1949
- A. polydamas Alexander, 1960
- A. polyspilota Alexander, 1937
- A. praepostera Alexander, 1956
- A. pristina (Alexander, 1924)
- A. proximata (Alexander, 1926)
- A. punctipennis (Philippi, 1866)
- A. recens (Alexander, 1921)
- A. relicta Alexander, 1928
- A. robinsoni Alexander, 1958
- A. saturnina Alexander, 1961
- A. septifera Alexander, 1968
- A. spectabilis (Alexander, 1921)
- A. spinicaudata Alexander, 1937
- A. stemma (Alexander, 1922)
- A. stenoptera Alexander, 1981
- A. sternolobata Alexander, 1957
- A. strigimacula (Edwards, 1923)
- A. striopleura Alexander, 1960
- A. styx Alexander, 1965
- A. subinterventa (Edwards, 1923)
- A. subpacifera Alexander, 1942
- A. subsessilis Alexander, 1970
- A. superstes Alexander, 1960
- A. tanana Alexander, 1972
- A. tenuilobata Alexander, 1942
- A. tergifera Alexander, 1953
- A. tergofurcata Alexander, 1965
- A. terpsis Alexander, 1960
- A. thornei (Wood, 1952)
- A. toxoneura (Osten Sacken, 1860)
- A. transvaalica (Alexander, 1917)
- A. tremula Alexander, 1929
- A. trifidula Alexander, 1960
- A. tsaratananae Alexander, 1955
- A. tunguraguensis Alexander, 1940
- A. varitarsis Alexander, 1929
- A. vivasberthieri Alexander, 1938
- A. volentis Alexander, 1951
- A. wilfredlongi Alexander, 1952
- A. wilhelminae Alexander, 1960
- A. wygodzinskyi Alexander, 1948
- A. xanthoptera Alexander, 1929
- A. yoruba Alexander, 1974
- A. yumotana (Alexander, 1934)
