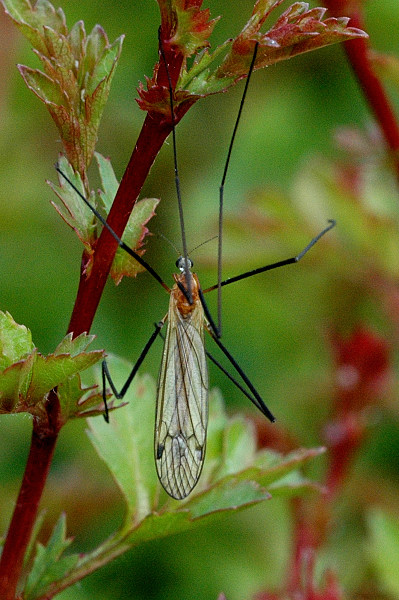
- Austrolimnophila ochracea

Scientific classification
- Kingdom: Animalia
- Phylum: Arthropoda
- Clade: Pancrustacea
- Class: Insecta
- Order: Diptera
- Family: Limoniidae
- Subfamily: Limnophilinae
- Genus: Austrolimnophila; Alexander, 1920

Type species
- Limnophila eutaeniata Bigot, 1888

= Austrolimnophila =

Genus of flies

Austrolimnophila is a genus of crane fly in the family Limoniidae.

== Species ==
- Subgenus Archilimnophila Alexander, 1934
  - A. arborea Savchenko, 1978
  - A. harperi Alexander, 1926
  - A. subpolaris Savchenko, 1969
  - A. subunica Alexander, 1920
  - A. subunicoides Alexander, 1950
  - A. unica Osten Sacken, 1869
- Subgenus Austrolimnophila Alexander, 1920
  - A. acanthophallus Alexander, 1955
  - A. accola Alexander, 1961
  - A. acutergata Alexander, 1939
  - A. agathicola Alexander, 1952
  - A. agma Alexander, 1972
  - A. aka Theischinger, 2000
  - A. amatrix Alexander, 1960
  - A. analis Santos Abreu, 1923
  - A. anjouanensis Alexander, 1979
  - A. antiqua Skuse, 1890
  - A. argus Hutton, 1900
  - A. asiatica Alexander, 1925
  - A. aspidophora Alexander, 1955
  - A. atripes Alexander, 1922
  - A. autumnalis Alexander, 1929
  - A. badia Doane, 1900
  - A. bifidaria Alexander, 1942
  - A. birungana Alexander, 1924
  - A. bradleyi Alexander, 1929
  - A. brevicellula Stary, 1977
  - A. bulbulifera Alexander, 1948
  - A. buxtoni Alexander, 1956
  - A. byersiana Alexander, 1968
  - A. candiditarsis Alexander, 1937
  - A. canuta Alexander, 1958
  - A. caparaoensis Alexander, 1944
  - A. chiloeana Alexander, 1953
  - A. chrysorrhoea Edwards, 1923
  - A. claduroneura Speiser, 1909
  - A. claduroneurodes Alexander, 1956
  - A. collessiana Theischinger, 1996
  - A. comantis Alexander, 1948
  - A. crassipes Hutton, 1900
  - A. croceipennis Alexander, 1962
  - A. cyatheti Edwards, 1923
  - A. cyclopica Alexander, 1947
  - A. danbulla Theischinger, 1996
  - A. deltoides Alexander, 1960
  - A. diacanthophora Alexander, 1962
  - A. diffusa Alexander, 1920
  - A. discoboloides Alexander, 1947
  - A. dislocata Alexander, 1961
  - A. distigma Alexander, 1920
  - A. duseni Alexander, 1920
  - A. echidna Alexander, 1956
  - A. elnora Alexander, 1929
  - A. ephippigera Alexander, 1946
  - A. erecta Alexander, 1934
  - A. eucharis Alexander, 1962
  - A. eutaeniata Bigot, 1888
  - A. excelsior Alexander, 1960
  - A. exsanguis Alexander, 1955
  - A. fluxa Alexander, 1936
  - A. fulvipennis Alexander, 1921
  - A. fuscohalterata Alexander, 1929
  - A. geographica Hutton, 1900
  - A. griseiceps Alexander, 1921
  - A. hausa Alexander, 1974
  - A. hazelae Alexander, 1929
  - A. hoogstraali Alexander, 1972
  - A. horii Alexander, 1925
  - A. illustris Alexander, 1923
  - A. infidelis Alexander, 1929
  - A. interjecta Alexander, 1936
  - A. interventa Skuse, 1890
  - A. iris Alexander, 1929
  - A. irwinsmithae Alexander, 1937
  - A. japenensis Alexander, 1947
  - A. joana Alexander, 1929
  - A. jobiensis Alexander, 1947
  - A. kirishimensis Alexander, 1925
  - A. laetabunda Alexander, 1960
  - A. lambi Edwards, 1923
  - A. latistyla Stary, 1977
  - A. leleupi Alexander, 1962
  - A. leucomelas Edwards, 1923
  - A. lewisiana Theischinger, 1996
  - A. linae Alexander, 1947
  - A. lobophora Alexander, 1960
  - A. luteipleura Alexander, 1949
  - A. macrophallus Alexander, 1958
  - A. macropyga Alexander, 1953
  - A. mannheimsi Alexander, 1960
  - A. marcida Alexander, 1924
  - A. marshalli Hutton, 1900
  - A. martinezi Alexander, 1957
  - A. medialis Alexander, 1921
  - A. megapophysis Alexander, 1979
  - A. merklei Alexander, 1928
  - A. michaelseni Alexander, 1929
  - A. microspilota Alexander, 1943
  - A. microsticta Alexander, 1929
  - A. minor Alexander, 1962
  - A. mobilis Alexander, 1934
  - A. multiscripta Alexander, 1960
  - A. multitergata Alexander, 1962
  - A. munifica Alexander, 1928
  - A. nahuelicola Alexander, 1957
  - A. natalensis Alexander, 1921
  - A. nebrias Alexander, 1962
  - A. neuquenensis Alexander, 1952
  - A. nigrocincta Edwards, 1923
  - A. nokonis Alexander, 1928
  - A. norrisiana Theischinger, 1996
  - A. nympha Alexander, 1943
  - A. obliquata Alexander, 1922
  - A. ochracea Meigen, 1804
  - A. oculata Edwards, 1923
  - A. oroensis Alexander, 1943
  - A. orthia Alexander, 1924
  - A. pacifera Alexander, 1937
  - A. pallidistyla Alexander, 1942
  - A. percara Alexander, 1957
  - A. percincta Alexander, 1955
  - A. peremarginata Alexander, 1955
  - A. persessilis Alexander, 1939
  - A. petasma Alexander, 1961
  - A. phantasma Alexander, 1956
  - A. platensis Alexander, 1923
  - A. platyterga Alexander, 1958
  - A. pleurolineata Alexander, 1957
  - A. pleurostria Alexander, 1958
  - A. plumbeipleura Alexander, 1949
  - A. polydamas Alexander, 1960
  - A. polyspilota Alexander, 1937
  - A. praepostera Alexander, 1956
  - A. pristina Alexander, 1924
  - A. proximata Alexander, 1926
  - A. punctipennis Philippi, 1866
  - A. recens Alexander, 1921
  - A. relicta Alexander, 1928
  - A. robinsoni Alexander, 1958
  - A. saturnina Alexander, 1961
  - A. septifera Alexander, 1968
  - A. spectabilis Alexander, 1921
  - A. spinicaudata Alexander, 1937
  - A. stemma Alexander, 1922
  - A. stenoptera Alexander, 1981
  - A. sternolobata Alexander, 1957
  - A. strigimacula Edwards, 1923
  - A. striopleura Alexander, 1960
  - A. styx Alexander, 1965
  - A. subinterventa Edwards, 1923
  - A. subpacifera Alexander, 1942
  - A. subsessilis Alexander, 1970
  - A. superstes Alexander, 1960
  - A. tanana Alexander, 1972
  - A. tenuilobata Alexander, 1942
  - A. tergifera Alexander, 1953
  - A. tergofurcata Alexander, 1965
  - A. terpsis Alexander, 1960
  - A. thornei Wood, 1952
  - A. toxoneura Osten Sacken, 1860
  - A. transvaalica Alexander, 1917
  - A. tremula Alexander, 1929
  - A. trifidula Alexander, 1960
  - A. tsaratananae Alexander, 1955
  - A. tunguraguensis Alexander, 1940
  - A. varitarsis Alexander, 1929
  - A. vivasberthieri Alexander, 1938
  - A. volentis Alexander, 1951
  - A. wilfredlongi Alexander, 1952
  - A. wilhelminae Alexander, 1960
  - A. wygodzinskyi Alexander, 1948
  - A. xanthoptera Alexander, 1929
  - A. yoruba Alexander, 1974
  - A. yumotana Alexander, 1934
- Subgenus Limnophilaspis Alexander, 1950
  - A. brevisetosa Alexander, 1950
  - A. ecalcarata Edwards, 1933
- Subgenus Mediophragma Alexander, 1954
  - A. delectissima Alexander, 1954
  - A. paraguayana Alexander, 1952
- Subgenus Phragmocrypta Alexander, 1956
  - A. albocoxalis Alexander, 1934
  - A. fulani Alexander, 1974
  - A. gyldenstolpei Alexander, 1924
  - A. maumau Alexander, 1956
  - A. recessiva Alexander, 1956
