= Austrolimnophila toxoneura =

Scientific classification
- Domain: Eukaryota
- Kingdom: Animalia
- Phylum: Arthropoda
- Class: Insecta
- Order: Diptera
- Family: Limoniidae
- Genus: Austrolimnophila
- Species: A. toxoneura

Binomial name
- Austrolimnophila toxoneura (Osten Sacken, 1859)

Synonyms
- Limnophila toxoneura Osten Sacken, 1859

Species of fly

Austrolimnophila toxoneura is a species of limoniid crane fly in the family Limoniidae.
