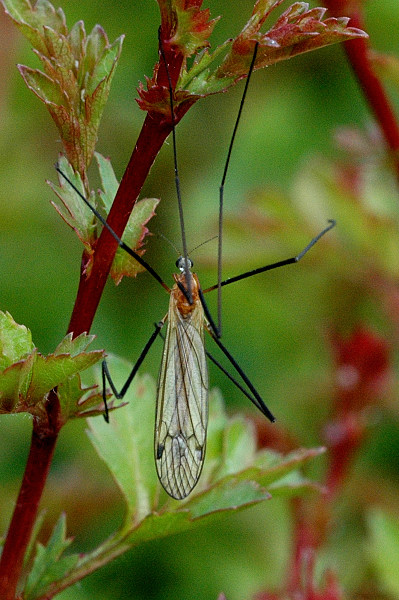

Scientific classification
- Kingdom: Animalia
- Phylum: Arthropoda
- Class: Insecta
- Order: Diptera
- Family: Limoniidae
- Genus: Austrolimnophila
- Species: A. ochracea

Binomial name
- Austrolimnophila ochracea (Meigen, 1804)

= Austrolimnophila ochracea =

Species of fly

Austrolimnophila ochracea is a cranefly in the family Limoniidae. It is a Palearctic species with a limited distribution in Europe It is found in a wide range of habitats and micro habitats: in earth rich in humus, in swamps and marshes, in leaf litter and in wet spots in woods.
