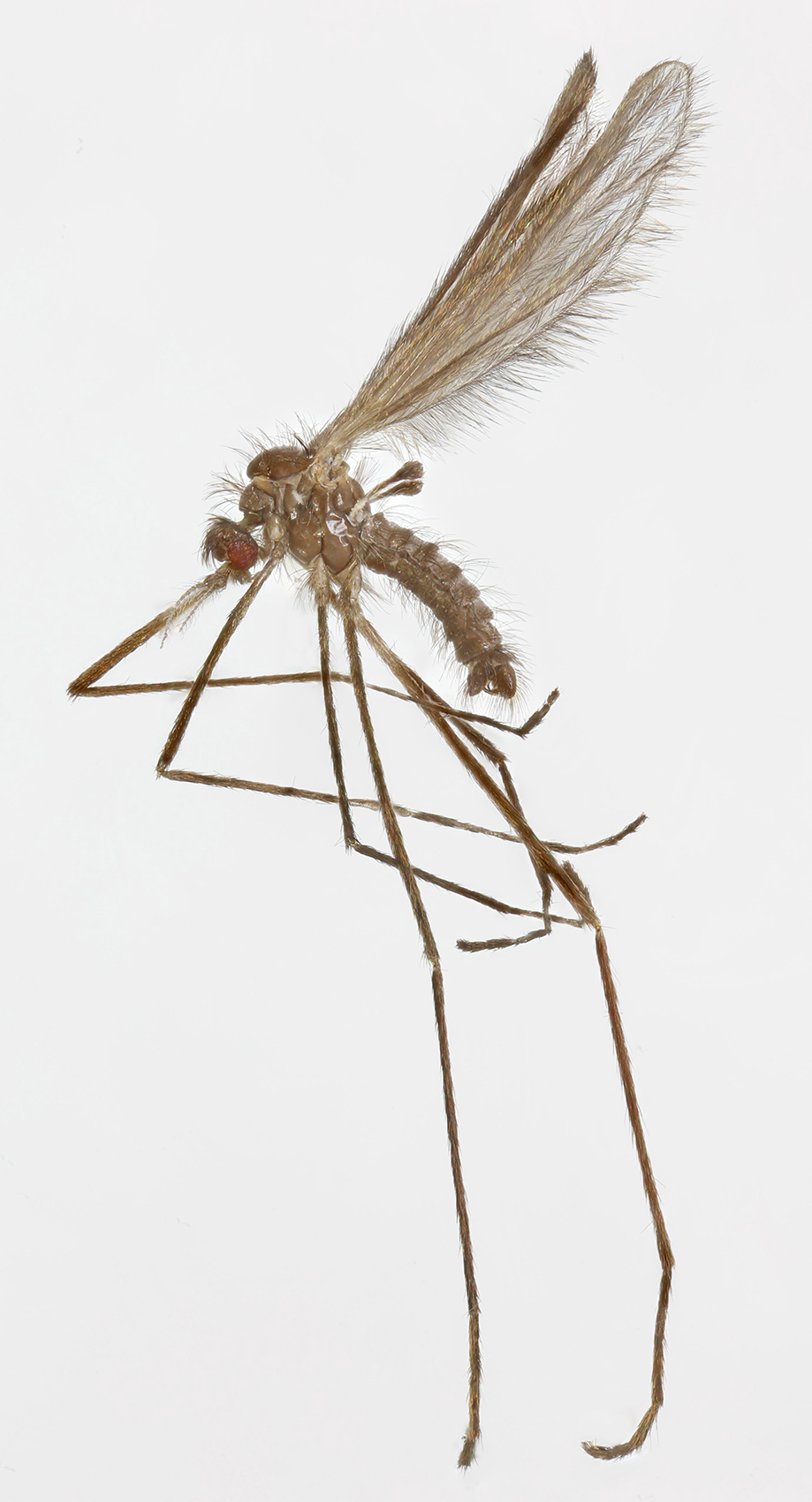
- Tasiocera murina
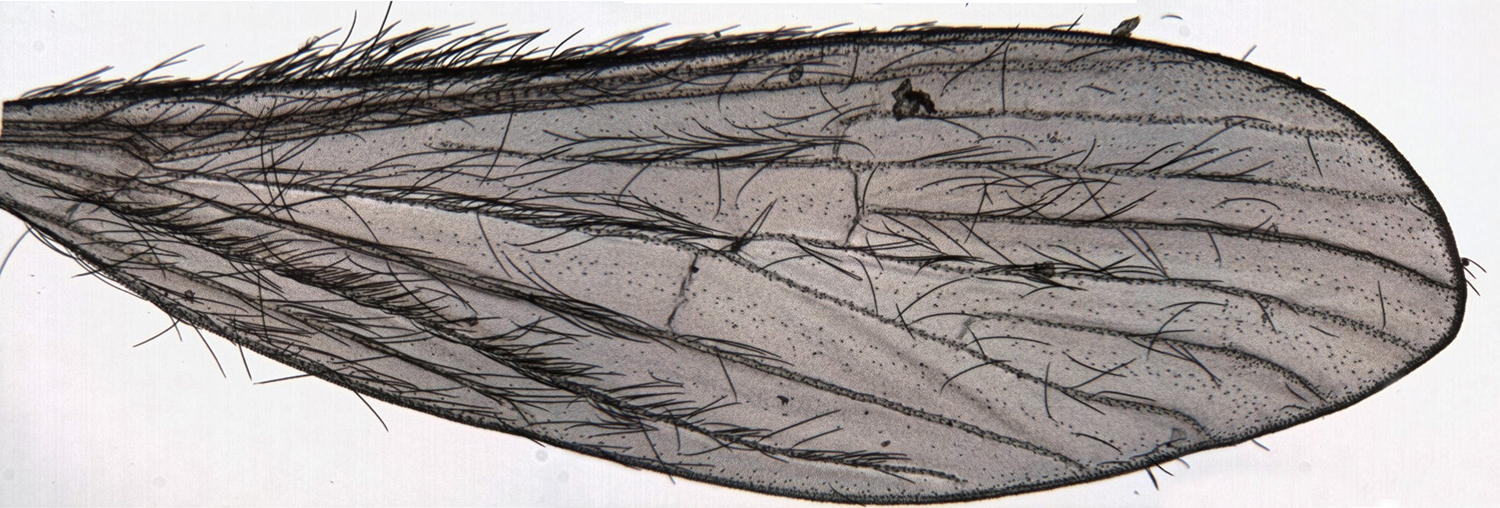
- Wing

Scientific classification
- Kingdom: Animalia
- Phylum: Arthropoda
- Clade: Pancrustacea
- Class: Insecta
- Order: Diptera
- Family: Limoniidae
- Subfamily: Chioneinae
- Genus: Tasiocera; Skuse, 1890

Type species
- Tasiocera tenuicornis Skuse, 1890

Subgenera
- Dasymolophilus Goetghebuer, 1920; Tasiocera Skuse, 1890

= Tasiocera =

Genus of flies

Tasiocera is a genus of crane fly belonging to the family Limoniidae. Species have been recorded in Britain. Members of the subgenus Dasymolophilus are characterized by narrow wings that are covered in dense setae which cover both the edges of the wing and the internal veins.

It has a poor fossil record. For a while, the only fossil species that was discovered was Tasiocera circumcincta however two more species were discovered from Eocene resins, Tasiocera gorskii and Tasiocera baltica.

== Species ==
- Subgenus Dasymolophilus Goetghebuer, 1920

- T. aspistes Alexander, 1965
- T. baltica
- T. basispinosa Alexander, 1979
- T. batyle Alexander, 1957
- T. biacufera Alexander, 1956
- T. boraceae Alexander, 1954
- T. brevicornis Alexander, 1929
- T. cyrtacantha Alexander, 1958
- T. diacanthophora Alexander, 1975
- T. dignissima Alexander, 1956
- T. eriopteroides (Alexander, 1921)
- T. exigua Savchenko, 1973
- T. fuscescens (Lackschewitz, 1940)
- T. gorskii
- T. gracilior Alexander, 1958
- T. halesus (Schmid, 1949)
- T. hova Alexander, 1951
- T. jenkinsoni Freeman, 1951
- T. jubata (Alexander, 1936)
- T. kibunensis (Alexander, 1936)
- T. liliputana (Alexander, 1934)
- T. malickyiana Mendl, 1985
- T. minima Mendl, 1974
- T. minutissima Edwards, 1912
- T. miseranda Alexander, 1950
- T. murina (Meigen, 1818)
- T. niphadias (Alexander, 1925)
- T. nokoensis (Alexander, 1928)
- T. orientalis Edwards, 1928
- T. plurispina Alexander, 1960
- T. probosa Alexander, 1956
- T. propria Alexander, 1956
- T. robusta (Bangerter, 1947)
- T. squiresi Alexander, 1948
- T. subnuda (Alexander, 1926)
- T. ursina (Osten Sacken, 1860)

- Subgenus Tasiocera Skuse, 1890

- T. acanthophallus Alexander, 1931
- T. angustistylus Alexander, 1926
- T. apheles Alexander, 1961
- T. aproducta Alexander, 1952
- T. attenuata Alexander, 1926
- T. axillaris Alexander, 1926
- T. barringtonensis Alexander, 1928
- T. bipennata Alexander, 1928
- T. bituberculata Alexander, 1924
- T. bucephala Alexander, 1931
- T. cascadensis Alexander, 1944
- T. caudifera Alexander, 1926
- T. cervicula Alexander, 1925
- T. cyatheti Alexander, 1931
- T. diaphana Alexander, 1932
- T. dicksoniae Alexander, 1931
- T. divaricata Alexander, 1932
- T. dorrigensis Alexander, 1928
- T. gourlayi (Alexander, 1922)
- T. gracilicornis Skuse, 1890
- T. hiemalis Alexander, 1931
- T. longiana Alexander, 1952
- T. nodulifera Alexander, 1937
- T. occidentalis Alexander, 1928
- T. otwayensis Alexander, 1937
- T. papuana Alexander, 1936
- T. paulula (Alexander, 1923)
- T. pernodulosa Alexander, 1955
- T. primaveris Alexander, 1928
- T. prolixa Alexander, 1944
- T. semiermis Alexander, 1932
- T. tarsalba Alexander, 1936
- T. taylori Alexander, 1931
- T. tenuicornis Skuse, 1890
- T. terraereginae Alexander, 1931
- T. tonnoirana Alexander, 1932
- T. tridentata (Alexander, 1922)
- T. triton Alexander, 1925
- T. unisetosa Alexander, 1926
- T. wilhelminae Alexander, 1961
