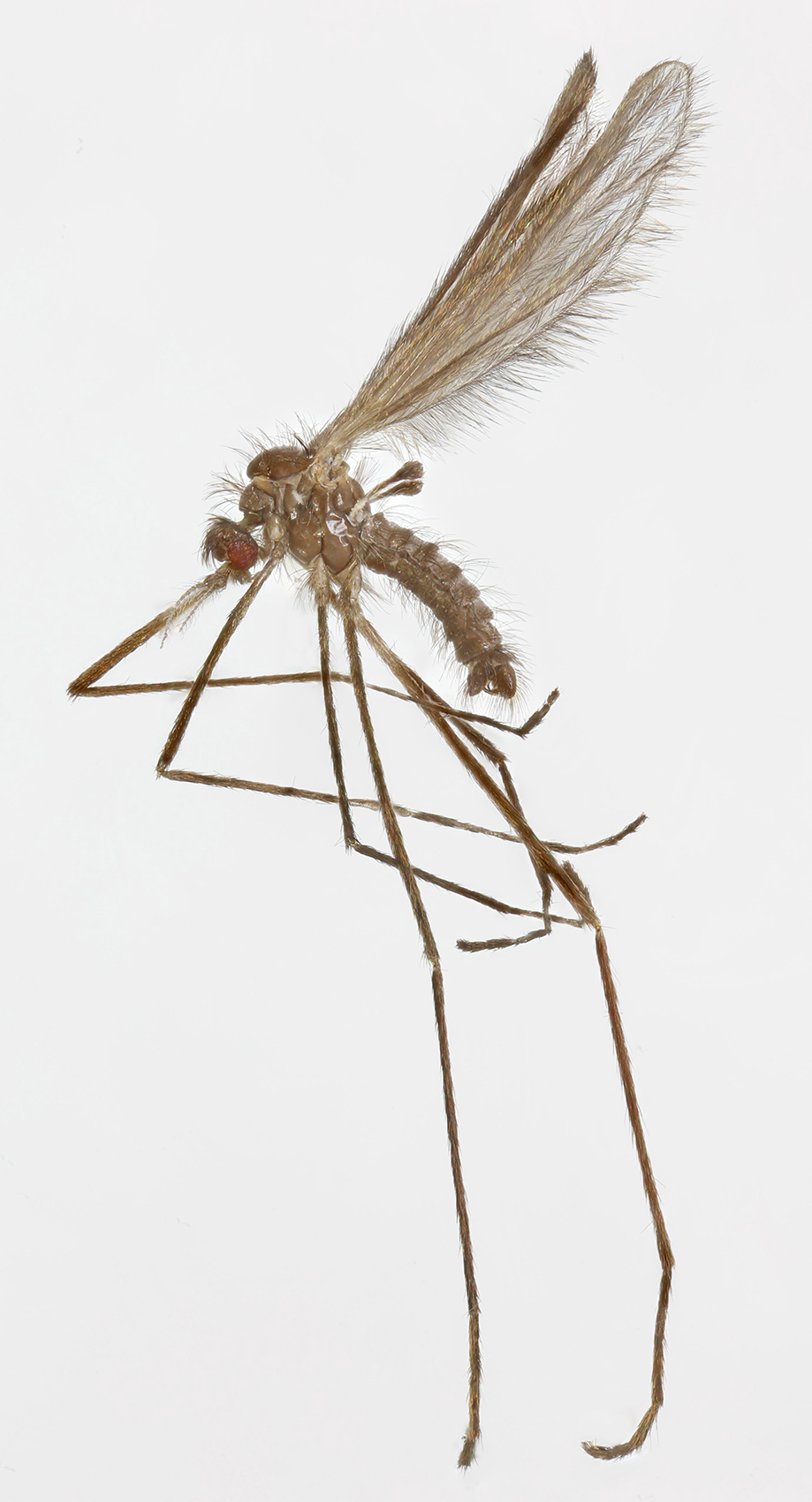
- Tasiocera murina North Wales

Scientific classification
- Kingdom: Animalia
- Phylum: Arthropoda
- Clade: Pancrustacea
- Class: Insecta
- Order: Diptera
- Family: Limoniidae
- Genus: Tasiocera
- Species: T. murina

Binomial name
- Tasiocera murina (Meigen, 1818)

= Tasiocera murina =

Species of fly

Tasiocera murina is a species of fly in the family Limoniidae. It is found in the Palearctic.
