= Polymera =

Scientific classification
- Kingdom: Animalia
- Phylum: Arthropoda
- Class: Insecta
- Order: Diptera
- Family: Limoniidae
- Subfamily: Limnophilinae
- Genus: Polymera; Wiedemann, 1820

Type species
- Chironomus hirticornis Fabricius, 1805

Subgenera
- Polymera Wiedemann, 1820; Polymerodes Alexander, 1920

Genus of flies

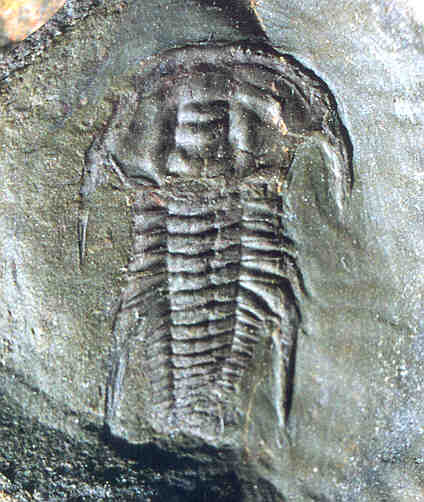
Emuella polymera of the Emuella genus; Lower Cambrian Emu Shale, Kangaroo Island, South Australia

Polymera is a genus of crane fly in the family Limoniidae.

== Species ==
- Subgenus Polymera Wiedemann, 1820

- P. aitkeni Alexander, 1978
- P. albiditarsis Alexander, 1953
- P. albitarsis Williston, 1896
- P. albogeniculata Alexander, 1926
- P. albogenualis Alexander, 1939
- P. anticalba Alexander, 1939
- P. arawak Alexander, 1964
- P. brachyneura Alexander, 1962
- P. bruchi Alexander, 1926
- P. cavernicola Alexander, 1964
- P. chiriquiensis Alexander, 1941
- P. cinereipennis Alexander, 1926
- P. cingulata Alexander, 1969
- P. clausa Alexander, 1939
- P. crystalloptera Alexander, 1921
- P. furiosa Alexander, 1950
- P. fusca Wiedemann, 1828
- P. fuscitarsis Alexander, 1937
- P. geniculata Alexander, 1915
- P. georgiae Alexander, 1911
- P. grisea Alexander, 1913
- P. hirticornis (Fabricius, 1805)
- P. honesta Alexander, 1940
- P. inornata Alexander, 1913
- P. leucopeza Alexander, 1940
- P. melanosterna Alexander, 1945
- P. microstictula Alexander, 1930
- P. minutior Alexander, 1942
- P. monosticta Alexander, 1948
- P. neoclausa Alexander, 1967
- P. nimbipennis Alexander, 1946
- P. niveipes Alexander, 1979
- P. niveitarsis Alexander, 1913
- P. nodulifera Alexander, 1940
- P. obscura Macquart, 1838
- P. ominosa Alexander, 1938
- P. parvicornis Alexander, 1932
- P. pleuralis Alexander, 1913
- P. prolixicornis Alexander, 1927
- P. pulchricornis Alexander, 1914
- P. regina Alexander, 1926
- P. rogersiana Alexander, 1929
- P. scelerosa Alexander, 1948
- P. sordidipes Alexander, 1938
- P. stenoptera Alexander, 1949
- P. subsuperba Alexander, 1926
- P. superba Alexander, 1913
- P. thoracica Alexander, 1913
- P. tibialis Alexander, 1922
- P. unipunctata Alexander, 1921
- P. verticillata Alexander, 1948
- P. zeylanica Alexander, 1958

- Subgenus Polymerodes Alexander, 1920

- P. catharinae Alexander, 1931
- P. conjuncta Alexander, 1913
- P. conjunctoides Alexander, 1920
- P. evanescens Alexander, 1948
- P. leucostropha Alexander, 1966
- P. minutissima Alexander, 1945
- P. parishi Alexander, 1920
- P. tasioceroides Alexander, 1948
