= Polymera rogersiana =

Scientific classification
- Domain: Eukaryota
- Kingdom: Animalia
- Phylum: Arthropoda
- Class: Insecta
- Order: Diptera
- Family: Limoniidae
- Genus: Polymera
- Species: P. rogersiana

Binomial name
- Polymera rogersiana Alexander, 1929

Species of fly

Polymera rogersiana is a species of limoniid crane fly in the family Limoniidae.
