= List of Tipula species =

This is a list of members of the crane fly genus Tipula.

== Tipula subg. Acutipula Alexander, 1924 ==
- T. acanthophora Alexander, 1934
- T. aktashi Koc, Hasbenli & de Jong, 1998
- T. alboplagiata Alexander, 1935
- T. alphaspis Speiser, 1909
- T. amissa Alexander, 1960
- T. amymona Alexander, 1951
- T. amytis Alexander, 1933
- T. angolana Alexander, 1963
- T. anormalipennis Pierre, 1924
- T. apicidenticulata Yang & Yang, 1995
- T. atuntzuensis Edwards, 1928
- T. aureola Mannheims, 1952
- T. auspicis Alexander, 1950
- T. bakundu de Jong, 1984
- T. balcanica Vermoolen, 1983
- T. bamileke de Jong, 1984
- T. bantu Alexander, 1956
- T. barbigera Young and Li, 2013
- T. bartletti Alexander, 1920
- T. basispinosa Alexander, 1970
- T. bicompressa Alexander, 1950
- T. bihastata Alexander, 1941
- T. bioculata Alexander, 1960
- T. bipenicillata Alexander, 1924
- T. biramosa Alexander, 1933
- T. bistripunctata (Speiser, 1909)
- T. bistyligera Alexander, 1935
- T. bosnica Strobl, 1898
- T. brunnirostris Edwards, 1928
- T. bubiana de Jong, 1984
- T. bubo Alexander, 1918
- T. buboda Yang & Yang, 1992
- T. bulbifera Alexander, 1953
- T. calcar (Alexander, 1958)
- T. camerounensis Alexander, 1921
- T. captiosa Alexander, 1936
- T. centroproducta Alexander, 1972
- T. chaniae Alexander, 1956
- T. cinnamomea Riedel, 1914
- T. citae Oosterbroek & Vermoolen, 1990
- T. cockerelliana Alexander, 1925
- T. coeana Alexander, 1966
- T. corsica Pierre, 1921
- T. cranicornuta Yang & Yang, 1992
- T. cretensis Vermoolen, 1983
- T. cypriensis Vermoolen, 1983
- T. dahomiensis Alexander, 1920
- T. desidiosa Alexander, 1933
- T. deva Alexander, 1952
- T. dichroa Bezzi, 1906
- T. dicladura Alexander, 1934
- T. diclava Alexander, 1922
- T. doriae Pierre, 1926
- T. echo Alexander, 1961
- T. ellenbergeri Alexander, 1920
- T. ellioti Alexander, 1920
- T. epicaste Alexander, 1952
- T. epularis Alexander, 1953
- T. forticauda Alexander, 1936
- T. fulani Alexander, 1975
- T. fulvipennis De Geer, 1776
- T. fumicosta Brunetti, 1918
- T. fumivena (Alexander, 1958)
- T. furcifera Young and Li, 2013
- T. furvimarginata Yang & Yang, 1992
- T. gaboonensis Alexander, 1920
- T. gansuensis Yang & Yang, 1995
- T. gemma Alexander, 1953
- T. globicauda Alexander, 1960
- T. gola Alexander, 1958
- T. grahamiana Alexander, 1964
- T. graphiptera Alexander, 1933
- T. guizhouensis Yang, Gao & Young, 2006
- T. hardeana Alexander, 1978
- T. hemmingseniana Alexander, 1961
- T. henanensis Li and Yang, 2010
- T. hokusaii de Jong, 1984
- T. hova Alexander, 1920
- T. hubeiana Yang & Yang, 1992
- T. incorrupta Alexander, 1933
- T. indra Alexander, 1961
- T. intacta Alexander, 1933
- T. interrupta Brunetti, 1911
- T. irrequieta Alexander, 1936
- T. ismene Mannheims, 1969
- T. isparta Vermoolen, 1983
- T. iyala Alexander, 1974
- T. jacobsoni Edwards, 1919
- T. jocosa Alexander, 1917
- T. kenia Alexander, 1920
- T. kinangopensis (Riedel, 1914)
- T. kumpa Alexander, 1961
- T. kuzuensis Alexander, 1918
- T. lambertoniana Alexander, 1955
- T. langi Alexander, 1920
- T. latifasciata Alexander, 1933
- T. latifurca Vermoolen, 1983
- T. leonensis Alexander, 1920
- T. leptoneura Alexander, 1922
- T. levicula Alexander, 1972
- T. lhabu Alexander, 1970
- T. libanica Vermoolen, 1983
- T. lieftinckiana Alexander, 1944
- T. linneana Alexander, 1966
- T. longispina Yang, Gao & Young, 2006
- T. loveridgei Alexander, 1972
- T. luctuosa Mannheims, 1964
- T. luna Westhoff, 1879
- T. luteinotalis Alexander, 1941
- T. macra Savchenko, 1961
- T. mannheimsiana Alexander, 1953
- T. masai Alexander, 1920
- T. maxima Poda, 1761
- T. medivittata Yang & Yang, 1995
- T. megaleuca Alexander, 1933
- T. melampodia Alexander, 1935
- T. meliuscula Alexander, 1920
- T. milanjensis Alexander, 1920
- T. milanjii Alexander, 1920
- T. mogul Alexander, 1970
- T. mungo de Jong, 1984
- T. natalia Alexander, 1956
- T. neavei Alexander, 1920
- T. nevada Dufour, 1990
- T. niethammeri Mannheims, 1969
- T. nigroantennata Savchenko, 1961
- T. nyasae Alexander, 1920
- T. obex Alexander, 1960
- T. obtusiloba Alexander, 1934
- T. octoplagiata Alexander, 1951
- T. omeiensis Alexander, 1934
- T. oncerodes Alexander, 1933
- T. oryx Alexander, 1921
- T. paria Speiser, 1909
- T. persegnis Alexander, 1945
- T. pertinax Alexander, 1936
- T. phaeocera Alexander, 1958
- T. phaeoleuca Alexander, 1940
- T. platycantha Alexander, 1934
- T. pomposa Bergroth, 1888
- T. princeps Brunetti, 1912
- T. pseudacanthophora Yang & Yang, 1993
- T. pseudocockerelliana Yang & Yang, 1995
- T. pseudofulvipennis de Meijere, 1919
- T. punctoargentea Alexander, 1960
- T. quadrifulva Edwards, 1921
- T. quadrinotata Brunetti, 1912
- T. radha Alexander, 1952
- T. receptor Alexander, 1941
- T. repanda Loew, 1864
- T. repentina Mannheims, 1952
- T. rifensis Theowald & Oosterbroek, 1980
- T. robusta Brunetti, 1911
- T. ruwenzori Alexander, 1920
- T. saitamae Alexander, 1920
- T. schizostyla Alexander, 1956
- T. schmidti Mannheims, 1952
- T. schulteni Theowald, 1983
- T. sichuanensis Yang & Yang, 1991
- T. sicula Alexander, 1961
- T. silinda Alexander, 1920
- T. sinarctica Yang & Yang, 1993
- T. sircari Alexander, 1953
- T. sjostedti Alexander, 1924
- T. sogana Alexander, 1965
- T. stenacantha Alexander, 1937
- T. stenoterga Alexander, 1941
- T. subintacta Alexander, 1936
- T. subturbida Alexander, 1933
- T. subvernalis Alexander, 1927
- T. takahashii Alexander, 1971
- T. tananarivia Alexander, 1960
- T. tenuicornis Schummel, 1833
- T. tigon Alexander, 1976
- T. tokionis Alexander, 1920
- T. transcaucasica Savchenko, 1961
- T. triangulifera Loew, 1864
- T. triplaca Alexander, 1961
- T. triscopula Alexander, 1970
- T. turbida Alexander, 1924
- T. uluguruensis Alexander, 1962
- T. umbrinoides Alexander, 1915
- T. urundiana Alexander, 1955
- T. vadoni Alexander, 1955
- T. vana Alexander, 1934
- T. vanewrighti Oosterbroek, 1986
- T. vanstraeleni Alexander, 1956
- T. velutina Walker, 1848
- T. victoria Alexander, 1920
- T. vittata Meigen, 1804
- T. yoruba Alexander, 1976
- T. yunnanica Edwards, 1928
- T. zambeziensis Alexander, 1917
- T. zhaojuensis Yang & Yang, 1991
- T. zuluensis Alexander, 1956

== Tipula subg. Afrotipula Alexander, 1955 ==
- T. aethiopica Alexander, 1972
- T. brachycera Riedel, 1914
- T. infracta Alexander, 1955

== Tipula subg. Arctotipula Alexander, 1934 ==
- T. aleutica Alexander, 1923
- T. bakeriana Alexander, 1954
- T. besselsi Osten Sacken, 1877
- T. besselsoides Alexander, 1919
- T. caliginosa Savchenko, 1961
- T. centrodentata Alexander, 1953
- T. conjuncta Alexander, 1925
- T. crassispina Savchenko, 1978
- T. denali Alexander, 1969
- T. dickinsoni Alexander, 1932
- T. excelsa Savchenko, 1961
- T. gavronskii Alexander, 1934
- T. hirticula Alexander, 1953
- T. hirtitergata Alexander, 1934
- T. hovsgolensis Gelhaus, Podenas & Brodo, 2000
- T. kincaidi Alexander, 1949
- T. laterodentata Alexander, 1950
- T. loganensis Alexander, 1946
- T. mckinleyana Alexander, 1969
- T. miyadii Alexander, 1935
- T. namhaidorji Gelhaus, Podenas & Brodo, 2000
- T. oklandi Alexander, 1922
- T. piliceps Alexander, 1915
- T. plutonis Alexander, 1919
- T. pudibunda Savchenko, 1961
- T. quadriloba Savchenko, 1967
- T. rubicunda Savchenko, 1961
- T. sacra Alexander, 1946
- T. salicetorum Siebke, 1870
- T. semidea Alexander, 1944
- T. smithae Alexander, 1968
- T. suttoni Alexander, 1934
- T. tribulator Alexander, 1956
- T. twogwoteeana Alexander, 1945
- T. williamsiana Alexander, 1940

== Tipula subg. Bellardina Edwards, 1931 ==
- T. albimacula Doane, 1912
- T. craverii Bellardi, 1859
- T. cydippe Alexander, 1947
- T. edwardsi Bellardi, 1859
- T. flinti Alexander, 1970
- T. fuscolimbata Alexander, 1981
- T. larga Alexander, 1946
- T. obliquefasciata Macquart, 1846
- T. parrai Alexander, 1940
- T. praelauta Alexander, 1949
- T. pura Alexander, 1941
- T. rupicola Doane, 1912
- T. schizomera Alexander, 1940
- T. theobromina Edwards, 1920
- T. wetmoreana Alexander, 1947

== Tipula subg. Beringotipula Savchenko, 1961 ==
- T. afflicta Dietz, 1915
- T. appendiculata Loew, 1863
- T. athabasca Alexander, 1927
- T. borealis Walker, 1848
- T. charpalex Byers & Arnaud, 2001
- T. clathrata Dietz, 1914
- T. coloradensis Doane, 1911
- T. comstockiana Alexander, 1947
- T. donaldi Alexander, 1965
- T. dorothea Alexander, 1954
- T. fallax Loew, 1863
- T. helderbergensis Alexander, 1918
- T. inclusa Dietz, 1921
- T. ingrata Dietz, 1914
- T. inyoensis Alexander, 1946
- T. latipennis Loew, 1864
- T. madera Doane, 1911
- T. monoana Alexander, 1965
- T. newcomeri Doane, 1911
- T. paiuta Alexander, 1948
- T. resurgens Walker, 1848
- T. rohweri Doane, 1911
- T. subunca Pilipenko, 1998
- T. unca Wiedemann, 1817
- T. yellowstonensis Alexander, 1946

== Tipula subg. Dendrotipula Savchenko, 1964 ==
- T. curvicauda Alexander, 1923
- T. dichroistigma Alexander, 1920
- T. flavolineata Meigen, 1804
- T. fortistyla Alexander, 1934
- T. hoi Alexander, 1936
- T. isshikii Alexander, 1921
- T. nigrosignata Alexander, 1924
- T. westwoodiana Alexander, 1924

== Tipula subg. Emodotipula Alexander, 1966 ==
- T. breviscapha Alexander, 1953
- T. fabriciana Alexander, 1966
- T. goetghebuerana Alexander, 1970
- T. gomina Dufour, 2003
- T. hemmingseni Alexander, 1968
- T. hintoniana Alexander, 1968
- T. holoteles Alexander, 1924
- T. leo Dufour, 1991
- T. lishanensis Young, 2014
- T. marmoratipennis Brunetti, 1912
- T. multibarbata Alexander, 1935
- T. multisetosa Alexander, 1935
- T. naviculifer Alexander, 1920
- T. obscuriventris Strobl, 1900
- T. saginata Bergroth, 1891
- T. shogun Alexander, 1921
- T. stylostena Alexander, 1961
- T. submarmoratipennis Alexander, 1936
- T. tenuiloba Alexander, 1971
- T. thailandica Young, 2014
- T. vaillantiana Alexander, 1964
- T. yangi Men, 2019
- T. yaoluopingensis Men, 2015

== Tipula subg. Eremotipula Alexander, 1965 ==
- T. anasazi Gelhaus, 2005
- T. artemisiae Gelhaus, 2005
- T. baumanni Gelhaus, 2005
- T. biproducta Alexander, 1947
- T. byersi Gelhaus, 2005
- T. dimidiata Dietz, 1921
- T. disspina Gelhaus, 2005
- T. diversa Dietz, 1921
- T. elverae Gelhaus, 2005
- T. eurystyla Alexander, 1969
- T. evalynae Gelhaus, 2005
- T. helferi Alexander, 1965
- T. impudica Doane, 1901
- T. incisa Doane, 1901
- T. jicarilla Gelhaus, 2005
- T. jongelhausi Oosterbroek, 2009
- T. kaibabensis Alexander, 1946
- T. kirkwoodi Alexander, 1961
- T. larreae Gelhaus, 2005
- T. leiocantha Alexander, 1959
- T. lyrifera Dietz, 1921
- T. macracantha Alexander, 1946
- T. maderensis Gelhaus, 2005
- T. madina Dietz, 1921
- T. melanderiana Alexander, 1965
- T. middlekauffi Alexander, 1965
- T. mitrata Dietz, 1921
- T. pellucida Doane, 1912
- T. rogersi Gelhaus, 2005
- T. sackeni Gelhaus, 2005
- T. schusteri Alexander, 1965
- T. sinistra Dietz, 1921
- T. spaldingi Dietz, 1921
- T. spinerecta Alexander, 1947
- T. spinosa Gelhaus, 2005
- T. utahicola Alexander, 1948
- T. woodi Alexander, 1948

== Tipula subg. Eumicrotipula Alexander, 1923 ==
- T. abortiva Alexander, 1914
- T. absona Alexander, 1937
- T. accipitrina Alexander, 1946
- T. accumulatrix Alexander, 1951
- T. acroleuca Alexander, 1978
- T. aedon Alexander, 1947
- T. aglossa Alexander, 1962
- T. agrippina Alexander, 1946
- T. albifasciata Macquart, 1838
- T. amblythrix Alexander, 1967
- T. amphion Alexander, 1952
- T. andalgala Alexander, 1919
- T. andina Brethes, 1909
- T. andromache Alexander, 1950
- T. angolensis Alexander, 1944
- T. antarctica Alexander, 1920
- T. anthonympha Alexander, 1928
- T. apterogyne Philippi, 1866
- T. araguensis Alexander, 1950
- T. araucania Alexander, 1929
- T. arecuna Alexander, 1931
- T. arenae Alexander, 1981
- T. armillata Alexander, 1916
- T. asaroton Alexander, 1962
- T. asteria Alexander, 1951
- T. atacama Alexander, 1912
- T. atameles Alexander, 1966
- T. atroscapa Alexander, 1949
- T. atrovelutina (Alexander, 1928)
- T. auricomata Alexander, 1942
- T. austroandina Alexander, 1929
- T. azteca Alexander, 1925
- T. backstromi Alexander, 1920
- T. balloui Alexander, 1938
- T. barretoi Alexander, 1923
- T. bathromeces Alexander, 1962
- T. belemensis Alexander, 1971
- T. biacerva Alexander, 1971
- T. bigotiana Alexander, 1920
- T. bogotana Alexander, 1938
- T. brethesiana Alexander, 1929
- T. brevicoma Alexander, 1944
- T. browniana Alexander, 1940
- T. bruchi Alexander, 1920
- T. callisto Alexander, 1944
- T. callithrix Alexander, 1944
- T. campa Alexander, 1914
- T. capucina Alexander, 1947
- T. carizona Alexander, 1913
- T. chacopata Alexander, 1944
- T. chanchanensis Alexander, 1969
- T. charmosyne Alexander, 1967
- T. chicana Alexander, 1945
- T. chilensis Alexander, 1920
- T. chillanica Alexander, 1945
- T. chilota Alexander, 1929
- T. chiricahuensis Alexander, 1946
- T. clarkiana Alexander, 1929
- T. clavaria Alexander, 1946
- T. coloptera Alexander, 1981
- T. consonata Alexander, 1940
- T. conspicillata Alexander, 1945
- T. coronaria Alexander, 1940
- T. crepera Alexander, 1952
- T. cristata Alexander, 1945
- T. crossospila Alexander, 1929
- T. curinao Alexander, 1914
- T. cyclomera Alexander, 1951
- T. darlingtoniana Alexander, 1939
- T. delectata Alexander, 1940
- T. diardis Alexander, 1969
- T. dictyophora Alexander, 1962
- T. dimorpha Alexander, 1929
- T. diodonta Alexander, 1969
- T. duidae Alexander, 1931
- T. duseni Alexander, 1920
- T. efficax Alexander, 1945
- T. emerita Alexander, 1944
- T. enderleinana Alexander, 1929
- T. estella Alexander, 1970
- T. euprepia Alexander, 1979
- T. exilis Alexander, 1916
- T. expleta Alexander, 1962
- T. fatidica Alexander, 1940
- T. fazi Alexander, 1928
- T. flavidula Alexander, 1940
- T. flavoannulata Jacobs, 1900
- T. flavopedicellaris Alexander, 1979
- T. foersteriana Alexander, 1967
- T. forsteri Alexander, 1962
- T. fortior Alexander, 1951
- T. fraudulenta Alexander, 1928
- T. fuegiensis Alexander, 1920
- T. glaphyroptera Philippi, 1866
- T. glossophora Alexander, 1962
- T. graphica Schiner, 1868
- T. guarani Alexander, 1914
- T. hadrotrichia Alexander, 1979
- T. hedymopa Alexander, 1944
- T. hostifica Alexander, 1937
- T. huanca Alexander, 1945
- T. hylonympha Alexander, 1929
- T. iguazuensis (Alexander, 1928)
- T. immerens Alexander, 1944
- T. immorsa Alexander, 1945
- T. inaequiarmata Alexander, 1962
- T. inaequidens Alexander, 1946
- T. inca Alexander, 1912
- T. incondita Alexander, 1951
- T. infidelis Alexander, 1951
- T. infinita Alexander, 1945
- T. innubens Alexander, 1942
- T. invigilans Alexander, 1951
- T. itatiayensis Alexander, 1944
- T. jacobsiana Alexander, 1929
- T. jaennickeana Alexander, 1929
- T. jivaro Alexander, 1916
- T. jubilans Alexander, 1940
- T. juventa Alexander, 1937
- T. kathema Alexander, 1966
- T. kuehlhorni Alexander, 1962
- T. kuscheli Alexander, 1967
- T. lanigera Alexander, 1928
- T. laterosetosa Alexander, 1931
- T. latifolia Alexander, 1944
- T. legitima (Alexander, 1928)
- T. lethe Alexander, 1971
- T. ligulata Alexander, 1929
- T. ligulipenicillata Alexander, 1946
- T. longibasis Alexander, 1946
- T. longurioides Alexander, 1955
- T. macintyreana Alexander, 1941
- T. macrotrichiata (Alexander, 1923)
- T. magellanica Alexander, 1920
- T. marmoripennis Rondani, 1850
- T. martinbrowni Alexander, 1946
- T. mecoglossa Alexander, 1967
- T. mediodentata Alexander, 1944
- T. meridiana Edwards, 1920
- T. microspilota Alexander, 1928
- T. miranha Alexander, 1913
- T. mithradates Alexander, 1951
- T. mitua Alexander, 1916
- T. mocoa Alexander, 1913
- T. moctezumae Alexander, 1925
- T. monilifera Loew, 1851
- T. moniliferoides Alexander, 1920
- T. moniliformis von Roder, 1886
- T. mordax Alexander, 1945
- T. morphea Alexander, 1946
- T. navarinoensis Alexander, 1962
- T. neivai Alexander, 1940
- T. nethis Alexander, 1966
- T. nigriscapa Alexander, 1946
- T. nimbinervis Alexander, 1946
- T. nolens Alexander, 1966
- T. nordenskjoldi Alexander, 1920
- T. nothofagetorum Alexander, 1929
- T. notoria Alexander, 1942
- T. novaleonensis Alexander, 1940
- T. novatrix Alexander, 1942
- T. nubifera van der Wulp, 1881
- T. nubleana Alexander, 1969
- T. obirata Alexander, 1940
- T. obscuricincta Alexander, 1940
- T. odontomera Alexander, 1967
- T. olssoniana Alexander, 1943
- T. omnilutea Alexander, 1967
- T. ona Alexander, 1920
- T. oreonympha Alexander, 1929
- T. orizabensis Alexander, 1941
- T. ornaticornis van der Wulp, 1891
- T. osculata Alexander, 1944
- T. palenca Alexander, 1944
- T. palitans Alexander, 1966
- T. pallidineuris Macquart, 1846
- T. pallidisignata Alexander, 1929
- T. pantherina Alexander, 1941
- T. paranensis Alexander, 1945
- T. parviloba Alexander, 1929
- T. patagonica Alexander, 1920
- T. pediformis Alexander, 1962
- T. perflavidula Alexander, 1979
- T. perjovialis Alexander, 1944
- T. perstudiosa Alexander, 1937
- T. petalura Alexander, 1953
- T. petaluroides Alexander, 1969
- T. petiolaris Alexander, 1940
- T. phalangioides Alexander, 1945
- T. philippiana Alexander, 1920
- T. pictipennis Walker, 1837
- T. pilulifera Edwards, 1920
- T. pirioni Alexander, 1929
- T. piro Alexander, 1914
- T. platytergata Alexander, 1962
- T. procericornis Edwards, 1920
- T. profuga Alexander, 1938
- T. protrudens Alexander, 1952
- T. psittacina Alexander, 1962
- T. pulchriflava Alexander, 1979
- T. quadrisetosa Alexander, 1951
- T. quichua Alexander, 1916
- T. reciproca Alexander, 1946
- T. redunca Alexander, 1967
- T. reedi Alexander, 1934
- T. resplendens Alexander, 1946
- T. riveti Edwards, 1920
- T. rucana Alexander, 1946
- T. rufirostris Bigot, 1888
- T. runtunensis Alexander, 1940
- T. sariapampae Alexander, 1967
- T. satrapa Alexander, 1952
- T. schachovskoyi Alexander, 1952
- T. scriptella Alexander, 1940
- T. semivulpina Alexander, 1944
- T. serrilobata Alexander, 1941
- T. serval Alexander, 1937
- T. songoana Alexander, 1962
- T. spatulifera Alexander, 1928
- T. spilota Wiedemann, 1828
- T. steinbachi Alexander, 1946
- T. stenoglossa Alexander, 1942
- T. suavissima Alexander, 1951
- T. subandina Philippi, 1866
- T. subcana Edwards, 1920
- T. subglabrata Alexander, 1951
- T. subjubilans Alexander, 1979
- T. subligulata Alexander, 1941
- T. tabida Enderlein, 1912
- T. tainoleuca Alexander, 1981
- T. tanymetra Alexander, 1962
- T. tehuelche Alexander, 1920
- T. tephronota Alexander, 1942
- T. tersa Alexander, 1928
- T. tersoides Alexander, 1945
- T. thalia Alexander, 1946
- T. tiolomana Oosterbroek, 2009
- T. tovarensis Alexander, 1947
- T. triemarginata Alexander, 1936
- T. trispilota Alexander, 1942
- T. tristillata Alexander, 1929
- T. tunguraguana Alexander, 1940
- T. tyranna Alexander, 1946
- T. unistriata Alexander, 1941
- T. ursula Alexander, 1951
- T. valdiviana Philippi, 1866
- T. varineura (Bigot, 1888)
- T. virgulata Williston, 1900
- T. votiva Alexander, 1944
- T. werneri Alexander, 1950
- T. willinki Alexander, 1962
- T. wittei Alexander, 1920
- T. woytkowskiana Alexander, 1942
- T. yanamonteana Alexander, 1945
- T. yungasensis Alexander, 1962
- T. zeltale Alexander, 1928
- T. zeugmata Alexander, 1951
- T. zotzil Alexander, 1928

== Tipula subg. Formotipula Matsumura, 1916 ==
- T. cinereifrons de Meijere, 1911
- T. decurvans Alexander, 1950
- T. dikchuensis Edwards, 1932
- T. dusun Edwards, 1933
- T. exusta Alexander, 1931
- T. friedrichi Alexander, 1935
- T. gongshanensis Men, 2020
- T. holoserica (Matsumura, 1916)
- T. hypopygialis Alexander, 1924
- T. ishana Alexander, 1953
- T. kiangsuensis Alexander, 1938
- T. laosica Edwards, 1926
- T. leopoldi Alexander, 1937
- T. lipophleps Edwards, 1926
- T. ludingana Li, Ding and Naizhong, 2013
- T. luteicorporis Alexander, 1933
- T. maolana Li, Ding and Naizhong, 2013
- T. medogensis Men, 2020
- T. melanomera Walker, 1848
- T. melanopyga Edwards, 1926
- T. obliterata Alexander, 1924
- T. omeicola Alexander, 1935
- T. rufizona Edwards, 1916
- T. rufoabdominalis Alexander, 1927
- T. sciariformis Brunetti, 1911
- T. spoliatrix Alexander, 1941
- T. stoneana Alexander, 1943
- T. tjederana Alexander, 1966
- T. unirubra Alexander, 1935
- T. vindex Alexander, 1940

== Tipula subg. Hesperotipula Alexander, 1947 ==
- T. aitkeniana Alexander, 1944
- T. arnaudi Alexander, 1965
- T. californica (Doane, 1908)
- T. chlorion Alexander, 1965
- T. chumash Alexander, 1961
- T. circularis Alexander, 1947
- T. contortrix Alexander, 1944
- T. coronado Alexander, 1946
- T. derbyi Doane, 1912
- T. fragmentata Dietz, 1919
- T. linsdalei Alexander, 1951
- T. micheneri Alexander, 1944
- T. millardi Alexander, 1965
- T. mutica Dietz, 1919
- T. opisthocera Dietz, 1919
- T. ovalis Alexander, 1951
- T. sanctaeluciae Alexander, 1951
- T. streptocera Doane, 1901
- T. supplicata Alexander, 1944
- T. sweetae Alexander, 1931
- T. trypetophora Dietz, 1919

== Tipula subg. Indratipula Alexander, 1970 ==
- T. comstockana Alexander, 1970
- T. needhamana Alexander, 1968

== Tipula subg. Kalatipula Alexander, 1971 ==
- T. skuseana Alexander, 1971

== Tipula subg. Labiotipula Alexander, 1965 ==
- T. leechi Alexander, 1938
- T. macrolabis Loew, 1864
- T. macrolaboides Alexander, 1918
- T. youngi Alexander, 1927

== Tipula subg. Lindnerina Mannheims, 1965 ==
- T. bistilata Lundstrom, 1907
- T. dershavini Alexander, 1934
- T. illinoiensis Alexander, 1915
- T. neptun Dietz, 1921
- T. senega Alexander, 1915
- T. serta Loew, 1863
- T. shieldsi Alexander, 1965
- T. subexcisa Lundstrom, 1907
- T. subserta Alexander, 1928

== Tipula subg. Lunatipula Edwards, 1931 ==
- T. abscissa Alexander, 1946
- T. absconsa Alexander, 1936
- T. accurata Alexander, 1927
- T. acudens Theischinger, 1977
- T. acuminata Strobl, 1900
- T. acutipleura Doane, 1912
- T. adapazariensis Theischinger, 1987
- T. adusta Savchenko, 1954
- T. adzharolivida Savchenko, 1968
- T. affinis Schummel, 1833
- T. alaska Alexander, 1918
- T. albofascia Doane, 1901
- T. albostriata Strobl, 1909
- T. alpina Loew, 1873
- T. ampliata Alexander, 1925
- T. ampullifera Mannheims, 1965
- T. angela Mannheims, 1963
- T. angelica Theowald, 1957
- T. anicilla Mannheims, 1967
- T. animula Mannheims, 1967
- T. annulicornuta Alexander, 1922
- T. anthe Mannheims, 1968
- T. antichasia Theischinger, 1979
- T. antilope Theischinger, 1977
- T. aperta Alexander, 1918
- T. aphrodite Mannheims, 1963
- T. apicalis Loew, 1863
- T. ariadne Mannheims, 1954
- T. armata Doane, 1901
- T. arnoldii Savchenko, 1957
- T. artemis Theischinger, 1977
- T. astigma Savchenko, 1968
- T. atreia Petersen & Gelhaus, 2004
- T. atrisumma Doane, 1912
- T. auriculata Mannheims, 1963
- T. aurita Riedel, 1920
- T. australis Doane, 1901
- T. bactridica Savchenko, 1954
- T. balearica Mannheims, 1968
- T. barbata Doane, 1901
- T. beieri Mannheims, 1954
- T. bernardinensis Alexander, 1946
- T. bernhardi Theischinger, 2009
- T. berytia Mannheims, 1963
- T. bezzii Mannheims & Theowald, 1959
- T. biaculeata Alexander, 1949
- T. biavicularia Alexander, 1965
- T. bicornis Forbes, 1890
- T. bifalcata Doane, 1912
- T. bifasciculata Loew, 1873
- T. bigeminata Alexander, 1915
- T. bimacula Theowald, 1980
- T. bisetosa Doane, 1901
- T. bispina Loew, 1873
- T. biuncus Doane, 1912
- T. bivittata Pierre, 1922
- T. boregoensis Alexander, 1946
- T. borysthenica Savchenko, 1954
- T. brinki Theischinger, 1987
- T. bucera Alexander, 1927
- T. buchholzi Mannheims & Theowald, 1959
- T. bulbosa Mannheims, 1954
- T. bullata Loew, 1873
- T. calcarata Doane, 1901
- T. canakkalensis Theischinger, 1987
- T. canariensis Theischinger, 1979
- T. capra Theischinger, 1980
- T. capreola Mannheims, 1966
- T. carens Theischinger, 1987
- T. cassiope Mannheims, 1966
- T. catawba Alexander, 1915
- T. caucasica Riedel, 1920
- T. caudatula Loew, 1862
- T. caudispina Pierre, 1921
- T. cava Riedel, 1913
- T. cedrophila Mannheims, 1963
- T. cerva Mannheims & Theowald, 1959
- T. cervula Mannheims & Theowald, 1959
- T. charybdis Theischinger, 1979
- T. chelifera Savchenko, 1964
- T. chernavini Alexander, 1934
- T. chloris Savchenko, 1972
- T. christophi Theischinger, 1982
- T. cillibema Koc, 2004
- T. cinerascens Loew, 1873
- T. cinereicolor Pierre, 1924
- T. cinerella Pierre, 1919
- T. circe Mannheims, 1954
- T. circumdata Siebke, 1863
- T. cirrata de Jong, 1995
- T. cirratula Oosterbroek, 1997
- T. cladacantha Alexander, 1945
- T. cladacanthodes Alexander, 1964
- T. clio Mannheims, 1954
- T. cornicula Pierre, 1922
- T. corollata Yang & Yang, 1995
- T. costaloides Alexander, 1915
- T. cressa Mannheims, 1965
- T. cretis Mannheims, 1965
- T. ctenura Savchenko, 1952
- T. curvata Theischinger, 1977
- T. curvispina Savchenko, 1954
- T. cypris Mannheims, 1963
- T. cypropeliostigma Vogtenhuber, 2002
- T. dampfiana Alexander, 1946
- T. danieli Simova-Tosic, 1972
- T. decolor Mannheims, 1963
- T. dedecor Loew, 1873
- T. degeneri Alexander, 1944
- T. densursi Alexander, 1943
- T. deserticola Savchenko, 1968
- T. detruncata Oosterbroek, 1997
- T. diabolica Alexander, 1954
- T. diacanthophora Alexander, 1945
- T. diarizos Vogtenhuber, 2002
- T. dido Alexander, 1947
- T. didymotes Theischinger, 1977
- T. dietziana Alexander, 1915
- T. disjuncta Walker, 1856
- T. dolores Mannheims, 1967
- T. dolosa Alexander, 1936
- T. dorica Mannheims, 1965
- T. dorsimacula Walker, 1848
- T. downesi Alexander, 1944
- T. dracula Theischinger, 1977
- T. dumetorum Savchenko, 1964
- T. duplex Walker, 1848
- T. dupliciformis Alexander, 1940
- T. eleniya Lantsov and Pilipenko, 2021
- T. emmahelene Theischinger, 1980
- T. engeli Theowald, 1957
- T. erato Mannheims, 1954
- T. erectispina Savchenko, 1954
- T. eugeniana Simova-Tosic, 1972
- T. euterpe Theischinger, 1979
- T. eyndhoveni Theowald, 1972
- T. fabiola Mannheims, 1968
- T. falcata Riedel, 1913
- T. fascicula Mannheims, 1966
- T. fascingulata Mannheims, 1966
- T. fascipennis Meigen, 1818
- T. fattigiana Alexander, 1944
- T. fenderi Alexander, 1954
- T. filamentosa Alexander, 1959
- T. fini Oosterbroek, 1997
- T. finitima Alexander, 1936
- T. flabellifera Savchenko, 1954
- T. flaccida Alexander, 1934
- T. flavibasis Alexander, 1918
- T. flavocauda Doane, 1912
- T. flavomarginata Doane, 1912
- T. forcipula Mannheims, 1966
- T. franzressli Theischinger, 1982
- T. freidbergi Theowald & Oosterbroek, 1987
- T. fuliginosa (Say, 1823)
- T. fulminis Alexander, 1945
- T. fulvinodus Doane, 1912
- T. furcula Mannheims, 1954
- T. furiosa Alexander, 1941
- T. fuscicosta Mannheims, 1954
- T. gallaeca Eiroa, 1989
- T. gebze Koc, Hasbenli & Vogtenhuber, 2007
- T. geja Savchenko, 1968
- T. gelensis Loi, 1971
- T. georgiana Alexander, 1915
- T. gibbifera Strobl, 1906
- T. gondattii Alexander, 1934
- T. graeca Oosterbroek & Vukovic, 1989
- T. graecolivida Mannheims, 1954
- T. grahamina Alexander, 1963
- T. griesheimae Mannheims & Theowald, 1959
- T. handschini Mannheims, 1967
- T. harmonia Mannheims, 1966
- T. hastingsae Alexander, 1951
- T. helvola Loew, 1873
- T. hera Theischinger, 1979
- T. hermes Theischinger, 1977
- T. heros Egger, 1863
- T. hirsuta Doane, 1901
- T. hirsuticauda Pierre, 1925
- T. hispanolivida Mannheims, 1968
- T. holzschuhi Theischinger, 1977
- T. horsti Theischinger, 1982
- T. huberti Theischinger, 1982
- T. humilis Staeger, 1840
- T. hybrida Savchenko, 1952
- T. hypovalvata Alexander, 1936
- T. hyrcana Savchenko, 1973
- T. iberica Mannheims, 1963
- T. iliensis Mannheims, 1965
- T. imbecilla Loew, 1869
- T. inadusta Alexander, 1946
- T. interrita Alexander, 1938
- T. inusitata Alexander, 1949
- T. istriana Erhan & Theowald, 1961
- T. jaroslavi Koc, 2007
- T. jativensis Strobl, 1909
- T. johnsoniana Alexander, 1915
- T. kephalos Theischinger, 1979
- T. kerkis Theischinger, 1977
- T. kinzelbachi Theischinger, 1982
- T. kirkwoodiana Alexander, 1965
- T. klytaimnestra Theischinger, 1979
- T. korovini Savchenko, 1970
- T. kreissli Theischinger, 1987
- T. kumerloevei Mannheims, 1968
- T. kybele Mannheims, 1968
- T. kykladon Theischinger, 1987
- T. laetabilis Zetterstedt, 1838
- T. lagunicola Alexander, 1969
- T. lamellata Doane, 1901
- T. lamentaria Alexander, 1934
- T. lanispina Mannheims, 1966
- T. lassenensis Alexander, 1965
- T. latistyla Savchenko, 1954
- T. leda Mannheims, 1965
- T. leeuweni Theischinger, 1982
- T. lehriana Savchenko, 1964
- T. leto Mannheims, 1966
- T. limitata Schummel, 1833
- T. lithophila Savchenko, 1968
- T. livida van der Wulp, 1859
- T. loewiana Alexander, 1915
- T. longidens Strobl, 1909
- T. lucasi Theischinger, 1987
- T. lucida Doane, 1901
- T. luebenauorum Theischinger, 1977
- T. lunata Linnaeus, 1758
- T. lyrion Theischinger, 1987
- T. macciana Edwards, 1928
- T. macnabi Alexander, 1939
- T. macquarti Becker, 1908
- T. macropeliostigma Mannheims, 1954
- T. macropyga Savchenko, 1952
- T. macroselene Strobl, 1893
- T. macswaini Alexander, 1965
- T. magnicauda Strobl, 1895
- T. maija Savchenko, 1973
- T. mainensis Alexander, 1915
- T. mallochi Alexander, 1920
- T. mallorca Theischinger, 1982
- T. manca Alexander, 1924
- T. mariannae Alexander, 1940
- T. mariposa Alexander, 1946
- T. martini Alexander, 1965
- T. mecotrichia Alexander, 1966
- T. megalabiata Alexander, 1915
- T. megaura Doane, 1901
- T. melanothrix Savchenko & Theischinger, 1978
- T. mellea Schummel, 1833
- T. melpomene Mannheims, 1954
- T. mendli Martinovsky, 1976
- T. mercedensis Alexander, 1965
- T. meronensis Oosterbroek, 1997
- T. mesotergata Alexander, 1931
- T. michoacana Alexander, 1946
- T. micropeliostigma Mannheims, 1965
- T. milkoi Pilipenko, 2005
- T. minos Theischinger, 1982
- T. miwok Alexander, 1945
- T. modesta Macquart, 1846
- T. modoc Alexander, 1945
- T. mohavensis Alexander, 1946
- T. monstrabilis Theischinger, 1980
- T. monticola Alexander, 1915
- T. montifer Theischinger, 1977
- T. morenae Strobl, 1900
- T. mormon Alexander, 1948
- T. morrisoni Alexander, 1915
- T. murati Koc, 2004
- T. musensis Theischinger, 1987
- T. naumanni Theischinger, 1979
- T. nausicaa Mannheims, 1966
- T. neutra Theischinger, 1982
- T. nigdeensis Bischof, 1905
- T. nigrobasalis Alexander, 1933
- T. nocturna Savchenko, 1964
- T. olympia Doane, 1912
- T. onusta Riedel, 1913
- T. oorschotorum Theischinger, 1987
- T. oosterbroeki Koc, 2007
- T. oreada Alexander, 1933
- T. ornithogona Theischinger, 1982
- T. osmana Mannheims, 1963
- T. oxytona Alexander, 1927
- T. pachyprocta Loew, 1873
- T. palifera Mannheims, 1965
- T. pallidicornis Savchenko, 1954
- T. pallidithorax Savchenko, 1954
- T. palmarum Alexander, 1947
- T. pandora Mannheims, 1968
- T. pannonia Loew, 1873
- T. parallela Theischinger, 1977
- T. parapeliostigma Mannheims & Theowald, 1959
- T. pararecticornis Savchenko & Theischinger, 1978
- T. parasimurg Savchenko, 1968
- T. paravelox Theischinger, 1987
- T. parshleyi Alexander, 1915
- T. pelidne Mannheims, 1965
- T. peliostigma Schummel, 1833
- T. pelma Mannheims, 1965
- T. pendula Alexander, 1924
- T. penelope Mannheims, 1954
- T. penicillata Alexander, 1915
- T. perfidiosa Alexander, 1945
- T. peteri Theischinger, 1979
- T. phaidra Mannheims, 1965
- T. pilicauda Pierre, 1922
- T. pinnifer Theischinger, 1977
- T. pjotri de Jong and Adgir, 2018
- T. pleuracicula Alexander, 1915
- T. poelli Vogtenhuber, 2012
- T. pokornyi Mannheims, 1968
- T. polingi Alexander, 1950
- T. polycantha Alexander, 1942
- T. polydeukes Theischinger, 1977
- T. powersi Alexander, 1965
- T. praecox Loew, 1873
- T. productisterna Alexander, 1963
- T. profdrassi Theischinger, 1980
- T. pseudocinerascens Strobl, 1906
- T. pseudolunata Theischinger, 1980
- T. pseudopeliostigma Mannheims, 1965
- T. pseudowolfi Theischinger, 1979
- T. pustulata Pierre, 1920
- T. pythia Theischinger, 1979
- T. quadriatrata Alexander, 1956
- T. quadridentata Savchenko, 1964
- T. quinquespinis Theischinger, 1980
- T. rabiosa Alexander, 1943
- T. rainiericola Alexander, 1946
- T. ramona Alexander, 1941
- T. rauschorum Theischinger, 1977
- T. raysmithi Alexander, 1965
- T. recticornis Schummel, 1833
- T. renate Theischinger, 1982
- T. retusa Doane, 1901
- T. rhodolivida Theowald, 1972
- T. rhynchos Theischinger, 1977
- T. rocina Theischinger, 1979
- T. rossmani Byers, 2003
- T. rotundiloba Alexander, 1915
- T. rudis Alexander, 1935
- T. rufula Mannheims & Theowald, 1959
- T. rugulosa Mannheims & Theowald, 1959
- T. ruidoso Alexander, 1946
- T. russula Theischinger, 1977
- T. rutila Savchenko, 1952
- T. sacerdotula Riedel, 1918
- T. sagittifera Alexander, 1948
- T. saltatrix Savchenko, 1964
- T. satyr Alexander, 1915
- T. savtschenkoi Simova, 1960
- T. saxemontana Alexander, 1946
- T. saylori Alexander, 1961
- T. schlingeri Alexander, 1965
- T. sciurus Theischinger, 1977
- T. seguyi Mannheims, 1954
- T. selenaria Mannheims, 1967
- T. selene Meigen, 1830
- T. selenis Loew, 1873
- T. selenitica Meigen, 1818
- T. seminole Alexander, 1915
- T. semipeliostigma Mannheims, 1965
- T. sepiaformis Vogtenhuber, 2002
- T. sequoiarum Alexander, 1945
- T. sigma Theischinger, 1979
- T. simova Theischinger, 1982
- T. simurg Dzhafarov & Savchenko, 1964
- T. siskiyouensis Alexander, 1949
- T. skylla Theischinger, 1979
- T. snoqualmiensis Alexander, 1946
- T. soosi Mannheims, 1954
- T. spatha Doane, 1912
- T. sperryana Alexander, 1942
- T. spetai Vogtenhuber, 2012
- T. splendens Doane, 1901
- T. stalagmites Alexander, 1915
- T. sternalis Theischinger, 1977
- T. sternata Doane, 1912
- T. stimulosa Mannheims, 1973
- T. strigosa Savchenko, 1952
- T. stubbsi Theischinger, 1979
- T. subacuminata Mannheims, 1963
- T. subaurita Savchenko, 1964
- T. subbarbata Alexander, 1927
- T. subbispina Savchenko, 1952
- T. subcava Mannheims, 1963
- T. subfalcata Mannheims, 1967
- T. subhelvola Mannheims & Theowald, 1959
- T. sublimitata Alexander, 1927
- T. sublunata Savchenko, 1952
- T. submaculata Loew, 1863
- T. submanca Savchenko, 1964
- T. subonusta Mannheims & Theowald, 1959
- T. subpustulata Mannheims, 1963
- T. subrecticornis Savchenko, 1964
- T. subselenitica Theowald, 1957
- T. substernalis Oosterbroek, 1997
- T. subtrunca Mannheims, 1966
- T. subtruncata Mannheims, 1954
- T. subvelox Savchenko, 1968
- T. suleika Mannheims, 1963
- T. sushkini Savchenko, 1964
- T. talyshensis Savchenko, 1964
- T. tanap Koc and Can, 2020
- T. tanneri Alexander, 1948
- T. tateyamae Alexander, 1918
- T. tazzekai Theowald, 1973
- T. tenaya Alexander, 1946
- T. tergata Doane, 1912
- T. tergestina Loew, 1873
- T. teunisseni Theischinger, 1979
- T. texensis Alexander, 1916
- T. thais Mannheims, 1963
- T. theia Mannheims, 1963
- T. theowaldi Savchenko, 1964
- T. tibonella Theischinger, 1977
- T. timberlakei Alexander, 1947
- T. titania Mannheims, 1966
- T. transcaspica Savchenko, 1954
- T. transfixa Alexander, 1933
- T. translucida Doane, 1901
- T. transmarmarensis Koc, Aktas & Oosterbroek, 1996
- T. trapeza Theischinger, 1982
- T. trialbosignata Alexander, 1935
- T. trifasciculata Strobl, 1900
- T. trigona Mannheims, 1966
- T. trispinosa Lundstrom, 1907
- T. triton Alexander, 1915
- T. truculenta Alexander, 1943
- T. trunca Mannheims, 1954
- T. truncata Loew, 1873
- T. turanensis Alexander, 1934
- T. turca Mannheims, 1963
- T. turcolivida Mannheims, 1968
- T. turgida Oosterbroek, 1997
- T. tuscarora Alexander, 1915
- T. twightae Alexander, 1959
- T. tyche Mannheims, 1966
- T. ulrike Theischinger, 1982
- T. unicincta Doane, 1901
- T. unicornis Theischinger, 1977
- T. urania Mannheims, 1954
- T. ursulae Mannheims, 1965
- T. usitata Doane, 1901
- T. valerii Savchenko, 1968
- T. valida Loew, 1863
- T. validicornis Alexander, 1934
- T. vermooleni Theischinger, 1987
- T. vernalis Meigen, 1804
- T. verrucosa Pierre, 1919
- T. vesubiana Dufour, 2003
- T. vitabilis Alexander, 1947
- T. vittatipennis Doane, 1912
- T. vogtenhuberi Theischinger, 1979
- T. vulpecula Theischinger, 1979
- T. wewalkai Theischinger, 1979
- T. willissmithi Alexander, 1945
- T. wolfi Mannheims, 1954
- T. xyrophora Theischinger, 1977
- T. yana Alexander, 1965
- T. yosemite Alexander, 1946
- T. zaitzevi Savchenko, 1952
- T. zangherii Lackschewitz, 1932
- T. zarcoi Mannheims, 1967
- T. zarnigor Savchenko, 1954
- T. zelotypa Alexander, 1946
- T. zimini Savchenko, 1954

== Tipula subg. Mediotipula Pierre, 1924 ==
- T. anatoliensis Theowald, 1978
- T. brolemanni Pierre, 1922
- T. cataloniensis Theowald, 1978
- T. caucasiensis Theowald, 1978
- T. fulvogrisea (Pierre, 1924)
- T. galiciensis Theowald, 1978
- T. gjipeensis Keresztes and Kolcsar, 2018
- T. mikiana Bergroth, 1888
- T. nitidicollis Strobl, 1909
- T. sarajevensis Strobl, 1898
- T. siebkei Zetterstedt, 1852
- T. stigmatella Schummel, 1833

== Tipula subg. Microtipula Alexander, 1912 ==
- T. aequitorialis Alexander, 1940
- T. affabilis Alexander, 1945
- T. akestra Alexander, 1966
- T. alecto Alexander, 1945
- T. amara Alexander, 1951
- T. amazonica (Alexander, 1912)
- T. amoenicornis Alexander, 1922
- T. anomalina Alexander, 1979
- T. apollyon Alexander, 1951
- T. appendens (Enderlein, 1912)
- T. ariranhae Alexander, 1945
- T. armatipennis Alexander, 1912
- T. auricularis Alexander, 1942
- T. austrovolens Alexander, 1951
- T. aymara Alexander, 1912
- T. baeostyla Alexander, 1979
- T. bigracilis Alexander, 1979
- T. bilimeki Alexander, 1941
- T. biprolata Alexander, 1967
- T. bitribula Alexander, 1967
- T. blaseri Alexander, 1942
- T. brasiliensis (Wiedemann, 1828)
- T. bruesi Alexander, 1945
- T. camura Alexander, 1979
- T. carib Alexander, 1970
- T. cerogama Alexander, 1944
- T. cithariformis Alexander, 1967
- T. colombicola Alexander, 1929
- T. contemplata Alexander, 1951
- T. costaricensis (Alexander, 1922)
- T. crassistyla Alexander, 1966
- T. ctenopyga Alexander, 1940
- T. decens Alexander, 1942
- T. decolorata (Alexander, 1935)
- T. detecta Alexander, 1927
- T. diacanthos Alexander, 1921
- T. diadexia Alexander, 1967
- T. didactyla Alexander, 1942
- T. didolos Alexander, 1962
- T. dirhabdophora Alexander, 1951
- T. discophora Alexander, 1951
- T. efferox Alexander, 1945
- T. effeta Alexander, 1921
- T. effulta Alexander, 1941
- T. epione Alexander, 1944
- T. erebus Alexander, 1979
- T. erostrata Alexander, 1945
- T. eurymera Alexander, 1945
- T. extensistyla Alexander, 1979
- T. falcifer Alexander, 1944
- T. feliciana Alexander, 1945
- T. ferocia Alexander, 1937
- T. fiebrigi Alexander, 1941
- T. flavopolita Alexander, 1942
- T. gladiator Alexander, 1914
- T. guato Alexander, 1912
- T. guerreroensis Alexander, 1940
- T. gutticellula Alexander, 1936
- T. heterodactyla Alexander, 1944
- T. hexamelania Alexander, 1951
- T. histrionica Alexander, 1945
- T. horribilis Alexander, 1945
- T. icasta Alexander, 1941
- T. impatiens Alexander, 1951
- T. inaequilobata Alexander, 1938
- T. inarmata Alexander, 1928
- T. infida Alexander, 1941
- T. intemperata Alexander, 1943
- T. jivaronis Alexander, 1943
- T. jordanensis Alexander, 1949
- T. juquiella Alexander, 1945
- T. klagesi Alexander, 1945
- T. lagotis Alexander, 1942
- T. languidula Alexander, 1942
- T. laticostata Alexander, 1937
- T. letalis Alexander, 1937
- T. lichyana Alexander, 1945
- T. luctifica Alexander, 1940
- T. luteidorsata Alexander, 1971
- T. luteilimbata Alexander, 1944
- T. lyriformis Alexander, 1942
- T. macrosterna (Alexander, 1912)
- T. mandator Alexander, 1945
- T. manniana Alexander, 1945
- T. mediocompressa Alexander, 1944
- T. megalyra Alexander, 1945
- T. monocera Alexander, 1967
- T. mulfordi Alexander, 1945
- T. multimoda Alexander, 1938
- T. myriatricha Alexander, 1942
- T. neolenta Alexander, 1945
- T. nicoya Alexander, 1944
- T. nigroabdominalis (Alexander, 1936)
- T. nigrovariegata Alexander, 1928
- T. niobe Alexander, 1947
- T. obstinata Alexander, 1971
- T. opipara Alexander, 1951
- T. ortoni Alexander, 1945
- T. pala Alexander, 1939
- T. palaeogama Alexander, 1944
- T. paloides Alexander, 1940
- T. paralenta Alexander, 1950
- T. pararia Alexander, 1966
- T. parishi Alexander, 1912
- T. penana Alexander, 1951
- T. perangustula Alexander, 1938
- T. percompressa Alexander, 1944
- T. percomptaria Alexander, 1945
- T. perdelecta Alexander, 1942
- T. perissopyga Alexander, 1979
- T. perlaticosta Alexander, 1941
- T. plaumannina Alexander, 1945
- T. plumbeithorax Alexander, 1921
- T. pontifex Alexander, 1967
- T. porrecta Alexander, 1951
- T. pretiosa Alexander, 1945
- T. pritchardi Alexander, 1940
- T. proctotricha Alexander, 1945
- T. prolixisterna Alexander, 1941
- T. quadricollis Alexander, 1945
- T. rectangulus Alexander, 1951
- T. regressa Alexander, 1950
- T. retrorsa Alexander, 1962
- T. scaphula Alexander, 1945
- T. scelesta Alexander, 1945
- T. schildeana Alexander, 1945
- T. schunkei Alexander, 1971
- T. schwarzmaieri Alexander, 1940
- T. septemhastata Alexander, 1962
- T. sexcincta Alexander, 1942
- T. smilodon Alexander, 1940
- T. smithi Alexander, 1912
- T. sparsipila Alexander, 1962
- T. spinicauda Alexander, 1919
- T. sternohirsuta Alexander, 1941
- T. subarmata Alexander, 1941
- T. subaymara Alexander, 1962
- T. subeffeta Alexander, 1951
- T. subeffulta Alexander, 1969
- T. subinfuscata Williston, 1896
- T. tancitaro Alexander, 1946
- T. temperata Alexander, 1940
- T. tenuicula Enderlein, 1912
- T. tenuilobata Alexander, 1940
- T. tergoarmata Alexander, 1971
- T. terpsichore Alexander, 1951
- T. terribilis Alexander, 1944
- T. tijucensis Alexander, 1943
- T. topoensis Alexander, 1951
- T. trichoprocta Alexander, 1945
- T. trihastata Alexander, 1945
- T. trinidadensis (Alexander, 1912)
- T. trinitatis Alexander, 1941
- T. tucumanensis Alexander, 1945
- T. urophora Alexander, 1938
- T. virgilia Alexander, 1951
- T. volens Alexander, 1944
- T. zeteki Alexander, 1945
- T. zonalis Alexander, 1927

== Tipula subg. Nesotipula Alexander, 1921 ==
- T. pribilovia Alexander, 1921

== Tipula subg. Nippotipula Matsumura, 1916 ==
- T. abdominalis (Say, 1823)
- T. anastomosa Edwards, 1928
- T. brevifusa Alexander, 1940
- T. champasakensis Zhang, Ren, Li and Yang, 2020
- T. coquilletti Enderlein, 1912
- T. edwardsomyia Alexander, 1964
- T. fanjingshana Yang & Yang, 1988
- T. flavostigmalis Alexander, 1953
- T. kertesziana Alexander, 1964
- T. klapperichi Alexander, 1941
- T. masakiana Alexander, 1968
- T. metacomet Alexander, 1965
- T. phaedina (Alexander, 1927)
- T. pseudophaedina Yang & Yang, 1992
- T. pulcherrima Brunetti, 1912
- T. sinica Alexander, 1935
- T. susurrans Edwards, 1932

== Tipula subg. Nobilotipula Alexander, 1943 ==
- T. brolemanniana Alexander, 1968
- T. collaris Say, 1823
- T. fuiana Alexander, 1949
- T. nobilis (Loew, 1864)
- T. specularis Alexander, 1961
- T. wardleana Alexander, 1968

== Tipula subg. Odonatisca Savchenko, 1956 ==
- T. breviligula Alexander, 1956
- T. gouldeni Podenas & Gelhaus, 2000
- T. kamchatkensis Alexander, 1918
- T. nodicornis Meigen, 1818
- T. optiva Alexander, 1921
- T. pribilofensis Alexander, 1923
- T. subarctica Alexander, 1919
- T. timptonensis Savchenko, 1956

== Tipula subg. Papuatipula Alexander, 1935 ==
- T. artifex Alexander, 1948
- T. consiliosa Alexander, 1971
- T. cyclopica Alexander, 1948
- T. divergens de Meijere, 1913
- T. gressittiana Alexander, 1971
- T. insperata Young, 1987
- T. koiari Young, 1987
- T. leucosticta Alexander, 1934
- T. lieftincki Alexander, 1971
- T. meijereana Alexander, 1935
- T. melanotis Alexander, 1948
- T. nigritus Young, 1987
- T. nokicola Alexander, 1953
- T. novaebrittaniae Alexander, 1935
- T. obediens Alexander, 1947
- T. omissinervis (de Meijere, 1906)
- T. oneili Young, 1987
- T. pedicioides Alexander, 1948
- T. pensilis Alexander, 1971
- T. satirica Alexander, 1971
- T. staryi Alexander, 1971
- T. strictistyla Alexander, 1971
- T. surcularia Alexander, 1947
- T. toxopeina Alexander, 1971
- T. wibleae Young, 1987

== Tipula subg. Pectinotipula Alexander, 1920 ==
- T. argentina (van der Wulp, 1881)
- T. boliviensis (Alexander, 1946)
- T. titicacae (Alexander, 1944)
- T. tucumana (Alexander, 1946)

== Tipula subg. Platytipula Matsumura, 1916 ==
- T. acifera Alexander, 1926
- T. acirostris Alexander, 1954
- T. alexanderi Joseph, 1974
- T. angustiligula Alexander, 1931
- T. appendifera Alexander, 1956
- T. autumnalis Loew, 1864
- T. bidenticulata Alexander, 1933
- T. carinata Doane, 1901
- T. chumbiensis Edwards, 1928
- T. continuata Brunetti, 1912
- T. cumulata Alexander, 1938
- T. cunctans Say, 1823
- T. cylindrostylata Alexander, 1926
- T. dinarzadae Theowald, 1978
- T. dissociata Alexander, 1936
- T. ecaudata Alexander, 1924
- T. esakiana Alexander, 1933
- T. hampsoni Edwards, 1927
- T. haplostyla Oosterbroek & Theowald, 1992
- T. hebeiensis Yang & Yang, 1995
- T. honorifica Alexander, 1933
- T. hugginsi Gelhaus, 1986
- T. imanishii Alexander, 1933
- T. indifferens Alexander, 1935
- T. insulicola Alexander, 1914
- T. jocosipennis Alexander, 1933
- T. knowltoniana Alexander, 1969
- T. luteipennis Meigen, 1830
- T. maritima Alexander, 1930
- T. melanoceros Schummel, 1833
- T. membranifera Alexander, 1936
- T. moiwana (Matsumura, 1916)
- T. nebulinervis Alexander, 1940
- T. nicothoe Alexander, 1953
- T. nigrocellula Alexander, 1935
- T. nikkoensis Alexander, 1921
- T. nipponensis Alexander, 1914
- T. omogicola Alexander, 1954
- T. paterifera Alexander, 1962
- T. pendulifera Alexander, 1919
- T. perhirtipes Alexander, 1963
- T. pterotricha Alexander, 1953
- T. querula Alexander, 1924
- T. quiris Alexander, 1940
- T. saragaminensis Alexander, 1954
- T. scheherezadae Theowald, 1978
- T. sessilis Edwards, 1921
- T. sparsiseta Alexander, 1924
- T. spenceriana Alexander, 1943
- T. stipata Alexander, 1935
- T. tennessa Alexander, 1920
- T. ultima Alexander, 1915
- T. violovitshiana Savchenko, 1961
- T. xanthodes Yang & Yang, 1991

== Tipula subg. Pterelachisus Rondani, 1842 ==
- T. aka Alexander, 1971
- T. albertensis Alexander, 1927
- T. alcestis Alexander, 1946
- T. alta Doane, 1912
- T. aluco Alexander, 1918
- T. angulata Loew, 1864
- T. apicispina Alexander, 1934
- T. aspoecki Vogtenhuber, 2004
- T. austriaca (Pokorny, 1887)
- T. autumna Alexander, 1921
- T. badakhensis Alexander, 1956
- T. bakeri Alexander, 1954
- T. banffiana Alexander, 1946
- T. bellardiana Alexander, 1926
- T. berteii (Rondani, 1842)
- T. biaciculifera Alexander, 1937
- T. bilobata Pokorny, 1887
- T. brindleana Alexander, 1964
- T. brunnicosta Brunetti, 1912
- T. camillerii Alexander, 1959
- T. carinifrons Holmgren, 1883
- T. cavagnaroi Alexander, 1965
- T. cayollensis Dufour, 2003
- T. cineracea Coquillett, 1900
- T. cinereocincta Lundstrom, 1907
- T. clinata Alexander, 1938
- T. coleana Alexander, 1940
- T. crassicornis Zetterstedt, 1838
- T. crassiventris Riedel, 1913
- T. crawfordi Alexander, 1927
- T. cruciata Edwards, 1928
- T. curvistylus Eiroa, 1990
- T. daitenjoensis Alexander, 1955
- T. derbecki Alexander, 1934
- T. diflava Alexander, 1919
- T. digesta Alexander, 1953
- T. dolomitensis Theowald, 1980
- T. edwardsella Alexander, 1923
- T. entomophthorae Alexander, 1918
- T. excetra Alexander, 1935
- T. famula Alexander, 1935
- T. fautrix Alexander, 1961
- T. flavocostalis Alexander, 1921
- T. futilis Alexander, 1924
- T. garuda Alexander, 1953
- T. geisha Alexander, 1958
- T. gelida Coquillett, 1900
- T. gemula Alexander, 1945
- T. glacialis (Pokorny, 1887)
- T. gredosi Theowald, 1980
- T. haplorhabda Alexander, 1935
- T. harutai Alexander, 1955
- T. helvocincta Doane, 1901
- T. hewitti Alexander, 1919
- T. hibii Alexander, 1933
- T. hirsutipes Lackschewitz, 1934
- T. hispida Savchenko, 1964
- T. hollandi Alexander, 1934
- T. hoogerwerfi Alexander, 1944
- T. horningi Alexander, 1966
- T. huntsmaniana Dietz, 1920
- T. huron Alexander, 1918
- T. hylaea Alexander, 1924
- T. icarus Alexander, 1936
- T. idahoensis Alexander, 1955
- T. ignoscens Alexander, 1935
- T. illegitima Alexander, 1933
- T. imbellis Alexander, 1927
- T. imitator Alexander, 1953
- T. incurva Doane, 1912
- T. ingenua Alexander, 1945
- T. interposita Savchenko, 1966
- T. irregularis (Pokorny, 1887)
- T. irrorata Macquart, 1826
- T. ishiharana Alexander, 1953
- T. jedoensis Alexander, 1933
- T. jenseni Alexander, 1965
- T. jutlandica Nielsen, 1947
- T. kaisilai Mannheims, 1954
- T. katmaiensis Alexander, 1920
- T. kaulbackiana Alexander, 1953
- T. kirbyana Alexander, 1918
- T. kuatunensis Alexander, 1941
- T. kurilensis Savchenko, 1970
- T. lacunosa Alexander, 1941
- T. laetabunda Alexander, 1961
- T. laetibasis Alexander, 1934
- T. laetissima Alexander, 1938
- T. latiflava Alexander, 1931
- T. legalis Alexander, 1933
- T. leucopalassa Alexander, 1964
- T. leucosema Edwards, 1928
- T. limbinervis Alexander, 1953
- T. luridorostris Schummel, 1833
- T. luteobasalis Savchenko, 1964
- T. maaiana Alexander, 1949
- T. macarta Alexander, 1936
- T. macrostyla Savchenko, 1964
- T. malaisei Alexander, 1927
- T. mandan Alexander, 1915
- T. margarita Alexander, 1918
- T. matsumuriana Alexander, 1924
- T. mayerduerii Egger, 1863
- T. mcdonaldi Alexander, 1975
- T. meijerella Alexander, 1966
- T. middendorffi Lackschewitz, 1936
- T. mitophora Alexander, 1934
- T. mono Alexander, 1945
- T. mupinensis Alexander, 1934
- T. mutila Wahlgren, 1905
- T. mutiloides Alexander, 1932
- T. mystax Alexander, 1961
- T. neurotica Mannheims, 1966
- T. niitakensis Alexander, 1938
- T. nudicellula Savchenko, 1966
- T. obnata Alexander, 1934
- T. ochotana Savchenko, 1970
- T. octomaculata Savchenko, 1964
- T. osellai Theowald, 1980
- T. pabulina Meigen, 1818
- T. padana Dufour, 1981
- T. pauli Mannheims, 1964
- T. pedicellaris Alexander, 1933
- T. penobscot Alexander, 1915
- T. percara Alexander, 1922
- T. pertenuis Alexander, 1938
- T. phaeopasta Alexander, 1924
- T. phryne Alexander, 1945
- T. pieli Alexander, 1937
- T. pingi Alexander, 1936
- T. plitviciensis Simova, 1962
- T. polaruralensis Theowald, 1980
- T. pollex Alexander, 1933
- T. pontica Savchenko, 1964
- T. procliva Alexander, 1938
- T. pseudobiaciculifera Men, Xue and Wang, 2016
- T. pseudocrassiventris Theowald, 1980
- T. pseudoirrorata Goetghebuer, 1921
- T. pseudopruinosa Strobl, 1895
- T. pseudotruncorum Alexander, 1920
- T. pseudovariipennis Czizek, 1912
- T. ranee Alexander, 1961
- T. recondita Pilipenko and Salmela, 2012
- T. resupina Alexander, 1935
- T. sauteri Dufour, 1982
- T. savionis Alexander, 1937
- T. sequoicola Alexander, 1947
- T. seticellula Alexander, 1932
- T. sharva Alexander, 1953
- T. shomio Alexander, 1921
- T. shoshone Alexander, 1946
- T. sibiriensis Alexander, 1925
- T. simondsi Alexander, 1965
- T. spathifera Mannheims, 1953
- T. stenostyla Savchenko, 1964
- T. striatipennis Brunetti, 1912
- T. strictura Alexander, 1937
- T. subfasciata Loew, 1863
- T. subfutilis Alexander, 1929
- T. subglacialis Mannheims & Theowald, 1959
- T. sublimata Alexander, 1953
- T. submarmorata Schummel, 1833
- T. submutila Alexander, 1933
- T. sunda Alexander, 1915
- T. taikun Alexander, 1921
- T. teleutica Pilipenko, 1999
- T. ternaria Loew, 1864
- T. tetramelania Alexander, 1935
- T. trichopleura Savchenko, 1964
- T. tridentata Alexander, 1920
- T. trifascingulata Theowald, 1980
- T. tristriata Lundstrom, 1915
- T. trivittata Say, 1823
- T. truncorum Meigen, 1830
- T. trupheoneura Alexander, 1920
- T. tshernovskii Savchenko, 1954
- T. tundrensis Alexander, 1934
- T. uenoi Alexander, 1930
- T. variata Alexander, 1927
- T. varipennis Meigen, 1818
- T. vayu Alexander, 1964
- T. vermiculata Savchenko, 1964
- T. vitiosa Alexander, 1933
- T. vivax Alexander, 1933
- T. wahlgreni Lackschewitz, 1925
- T. wardiana Alexander, 1951
- T. wiedemanniana Alexander, 1971
- T. winthemi Lackschewitz, 1932
- T. wuana Alexander, 1966
- T. yasumatsuana Alexander, 1954

== Tipula subg. Ramatipula Alexander, 1971 ==
- T. bagchiana Alexander, 1971
- T. bangerterana Alexander, 1964
- T. bilobula Alexander, 1938
- T. flavithorax Brunetti, 1918
- T. kuntzeana Alexander, 1971
- T. octacantha Alexander, 1961
- T. phallacaena Alexander, 1964
- T. pierreana Alexander, 1964
- T. podana Alexander, 1971
- T. shawiana Alexander, 1953

== Tipula subg. Savtshenkia Alexander, 1965 ==
- T. aberdareica Alexander, 1956
- T. akeleyi Alexander, 1956
- T. alpha de Jong, 1994
- T. alpium Bergroth, 1888
- T. anadyrensis Pilipenko, 2011
- T. antricola Riedel, 1918
- T. asbolodes Speiser, 1909
- T. aspromontensis Theowald, 1973
- T. aster Theischinger, 1983
- T. atlas Pierre, 1924
- T. baltistanica Alexander, 1936
- T. benesignata Mannheims, 1954
- T. boreosignata Tjeder, 1969
- T. breviantennata Lackschewitz, 1933
- T. caligo Alexander, 1956
- T. cheethami Edwards, 1924
- T. chrysocephala Mannheims, 1958
- T. confusa van der Wulp, 1883
- T. convexifrons Holmgren, 1883
- T. corsosignata Theowald, Dufour & Oosterbroek, 1982
- T. cyrnosardensis Theowald, Dufour & Oosterbroek, 1982
- T. draconis Alexander, 1964
- T. eleonorae Theischinger, 1978
- T. elgonensis Alexander, 1956
- T. eugeni Theowald, 1973
- T. fragilina Alexander, 1919
- T. fragilis Loew, 1863
- T. gimmerthali Lackschewitz, 1925
- T. glaucocinerea Lundstrom, 1915
- T. goriziensis Strobl, 1893
- T. graciae Alexander, 1947
- T. grisescens Zetterstedt, 1851
- T. haennii Dufour, 1991
- T. hancocki Alexander, 1956
- T. hartigiana Theowald, Dufour & Oosterbroek, 1982
- T. holoptera Edwards, 1939
- T. ignobilis Loew, 1863
- T. interserta Riedel, 1913
- T. invenusta Riedel, 1919
- T. jeekeli Mannheims & Theowald, 1959
- T. kiushiuensis Alexander, 1925
- T. koreana Alexander, 1934
- T. letifera Alexander, 1951
- T. limbata Zetterstedt, 1838
- T. lundbladi Mannheims, 1962
- T. macaronesica Savchenko, 1961
- T. mannheimsi Theowald, 1973
- T. minuscula Savchenko, 1971
- T. mohriana Alexander, 1954
- T. multipicta Becker, 1908
- T. nephrotomoides Alexander, 1924
- T. nielseni Mannheims & Theowald, 1959
- T. nivalis Savchenko, 1961
- T. obsoleta Meigen, 1818
- T. odontostyla Savchenko, 1961
- T. omega de Jong, 1994
- T. ornata Theowald & Oosterbroek, 1987
- T. pagana Meigen, 1818
- T. pechlaneri Mannheims & Theowald, 1959
- T. persignata Alexander, 1945
- T. phoroctenia Alexander, 1919
- T. postposita Riedel, 1919
- T. productella Alexander, 1928
- T. rothschildi Alexander, 1920
- T. rufina Meigen, 1818
- T. sardosignata Mannheims & Theowald, 1959
- T. sciadoptera Alexander, 1964
- T. serrulifera Alexander, 1942
- T. signata Staeger, 1840
- T. simulans Savchenko, 1966
- T. sordidipes Alexander, 1961
- T. staegeri Nielsen, 1922
- T. subalpium Savchenko, 1961
- T. subnodicornis Zetterstedt, 1838
- T. subsignata Lackschewitz, 1933
- T. subvafra Lackschewitz, 1936
- T. tetragramma Edwards, 1928
- T. trinacria de Jong, 1994
- T. tulipa Dufour, 1983
- T. venerabilis Alexander, 1936
- T. villeneuvii Strobl, 1909
- T. wulingshana Yang & Yang, 1995

== Tipula subg. Schummelia Edwards, 1931 ==
- T. ahrensi Savchenko, 1957
- T. annulicornis Say, 1829
- T. argentacea Alexander, 1961
- T. argentosigna Alexander, 1961
- T. atrosetosa Alexander, 1961
- T. bicolorata Alexander, 1938
- T. butzi Edwards, 1928
- T. costolutea Alexander, 1964
- T. coulsoni Alexander, 1966
- T. cramptoniana Alexander, 1966
- T. crastina Alexander, 1941
- T. decembris Alexander, 1949
- T. dharma Alexander, 1956
- T. dolichopezoides Alexander, 1920
- T. dravidiana Alexander, 1961
- T. durga Alexander, 1964
- T. eggeriana Alexander, 1971
- T. friendi Alexander, 1940
- T. fuscocellula Alexander, 1961
- T. halidayana Alexander, 1970
- T. hennigiana Alexander, 1971
- T. hermannia Alexander, 1915
- T. hinayana Alexander, 1956
- T. inconspicua de Meijere, 1911
- T. indiscreta Alexander, 1935
- T. ishidana Alexander, 1964
- T. ishizuchiana Alexander, 1954
- T. jacksoniana Alexander, 1956
- T. kariyana Alexander, 1966
- T. kiddana Alexander, 1966
- T. klossi Edwards, 1916
- T. lama Alexander, 1954
- T. lindneriana Alexander, 1964
- T. lioterga Alexander, 1961
- T. magnifolia Alexander, 1948
- T. medica Alexander, 1936
- T. nannaris Alexander, 1961
- T. nobilior Alexander, 1961
- T. notomelania Alexander, 1958
- T. oldhamana Alexander, 1966
- T. pagastiana Alexander, 1966
- T. pendleburyi Edwards, 1933
- T. penicillaris Alexander, 1961
- T. pokornyana Alexander, 1966
- T. pumila de Meijere, 1914
- T. rantaicola Alexander, 1929
- T. rhombica Edwards, 1932
- T. salakensis Alexander, 1915
- T. schrankiana Alexander, 1971
- T. scylla Alexander, 1964
- T. sophista Alexander, 1949
- T. sparsissima Alexander, 1928
- T. sphaerostyla Alexander, 1966
- T. stenorhabda Alexander, 1941
- T. strictiva Alexander, 1935
- T. subtenuicornis Doane, 1901
- T. synchroa Alexander, 1927
- T. tanyrhina Alexander, 1961
- T. tonnoirana Alexander, 1968
- T. turea Alexander, 1956
- T. variicornis Schummel, 1833
- T. venusticornis Alexander, 1964
- T. verrallana Alexander, 1966
- T. vitalisi Edwards, 1926
- T. vocator Alexander, 1956
- T. yerburyi Edwards, 1924
- T. zernyi Mannheims, 1952
- T. zonaria Goetghebuer, 1921

== Tipula subg. Serratipula Alexander, 1965 ==
- T. cylindrata Doane, 1912
- T. graminivora Alexander, 1921
- T. marina Doane, 1912
- T. tristis Doane, 1901

== Tipula subg. Setitipula Alexander, 1965 ==
- T. esselen Alexander, 1965
- T. rusticola Doane, 1912
- T. trichophora Alexander, 1920

== Tipula subg. Sinotipula Alexander, 1935 ==
- T. abluta Doane, 1901
- T. arjuna Alexander, 1962
- T. arjunoides Alexander, 1961
- T. aspersa Doane, 1912
- T. assamensis Oosterbroek, 2009
- T. babai Alexander, 1971
- T. bodpa Edwards, 1928
- T. brunettiana Alexander, 1920
- T. calaveras Alexander, 1944
- T. callicoma Alexander, 1966
- T. catalinensis Alexander, 1950
- T. chimaera Savchenko, 1969
- T. coleomyia Alexander, 1965
- T. commiscibilis Doane, 1912
- T. cranbrooki Alexander, 1951
- T. curtisiana Alexander, 1971
- T. delfinadoae Alexander, 1973
- T. denningi Alexander, 1969
- T. differta Alexander, 1956
- T. dyrope Alexander, 1961
- T. emiliae Savchenko, 1964
- T. exquisita Alexander, 1935
- T. faustina Alexander, 1941
- T. gloriosa Alexander, 1935
- T. gothicana Alexander, 1943
- T. gracilirostris Alexander, 1938
- T. gregoryi Edwards, 1928
- T. griseipennis Brunetti, 1912
- T. hingstoni Edwards, 1928
- T. hobsoni Edwards, 1928
- T. hutchinsonae Alexander, 1936
- T. hypsistos Alexander, 1962
- T. janetscheki Alexander, 1968
- T. jepsoni Alexander, 1945
- T. josephus Alexander, 1954
- T. krishna Alexander, 1962
- T. lithostrota Alexander, 1961
- T. macquartina Alexander, 1966
- T. meigeniana Alexander, 1966
- T. oenone Alexander, 1961
- T. pacifica Doane, 1912
- T. persplendens Alexander, 1935
- T. powelli Alexander, 1965
- T. rastristyla Alexander, 1945
- T. rondaniana Alexander, 1970
- T. sacajawea Alexander, 1945
- T. savtshenkoana Alexander, 1964
- T. schizorhyncha Savchenko, 1966
- T. schmidiana Alexander, 1961
- T. seguyana Alexander, 1964
- T. shastensis Alexander, 1944
- T. shennongana Yang & Yang, 1992
- T. sindensis Alexander, 1935
- T. staegeriana Alexander, 1971
- T. strobliana Alexander, 1971
- T. subcinerea Doane, 1901
- T. tessellatipennis Brunetti, 1912
- T. tesuque Teale, 1985
- T. thibetana de Meijere, 1904
- T. trilobata Edwards, 1928
- T. tsiosenica Alexander, 1945
- T. umbra Alexander, 1959
- T. waltoni Edwards, 1928
- T. wardi Edwards, 1928
- T. warneri Alexander, 1944

== Tipula subg. Sivatipula Alexander, 1964 ==
- T. alhena Alexander, 1953
- T. bhishma Alexander, 1964
- T. biprocessa Xue and Men, 2016
- T. filicornis Brunetti, 1918
- T. lackschewitziana Alexander, 1928
- T. mitocera Alexander, 1927
- T. multidentata Men, 2018
- T. parvauricula Alexander, 1941
- T. pianmaensis Men, 2020
- T. podenasi Men, 2020
- T. pseudofilicornis Men, 2020
- T. pullimargo Alexander, 1951
- T. similis Men, 2016
- T. suensoniana Alexander, 1940
- T. tergatruncata Men, 2018
- T. tongbiguanensis Men, 2016
- T. yigongensis Yang, Pan and Yang, 2019

== Tipula subg. Spinitipula Alexander, 1963 ==
- T. citricornis Alexander, 1955
- T. lactineipes Alexander, 1961
- T. spinimarginata Alexander, 1951

== Tipula subg. Tipula Linnaeus, 1758 ==
- T. atlantica Mannheims, 1962
- T. bicolor Loew, 1866
- T. capnioneura Speiser, 1909
- T. chubbi Alexander, 1956
- T. consobrina Theowald, 1984
- T. eumecacera Speiser, 1909
- T. flagellicurta Mannheims, 1958
- T. frater Alexander, 1921
- T. hollanderi Theowald, 1977
- T. hungarica Lackschewitz, 1930
- T. italica Lackschewitz, 1930
- T. kleinschmidti Mannheims, 1950
- T. lobeliae Alexander, 1956
- T. loeffleri Theowald, 1984
- T. lourensi den Hollander, 1975
- T. mediterranea Lackschewitz, 1930
- T. oleracea Linnaeus, 1758
- T. orientalis Lackschewitz, 1930
- T. paludosa Meigen, 1830
- T. plumbea Fabricius, 1781
- T. soror Wiedemann, 1820
- T. speiseriana Alexander, 1930
- T. strigata Loew, 1866
- T. subaptera Freeman, 1950
- T. subcunctans Alexander, 1921
- T. zimbabwensis Theowald, 1984

== Tipula subg. Tipulodinodes Alexander, 1965 ==
- T. lacteipes Alexander, 1943

== Tipula subg. Trichotipula Alexander, 1915 ==
- T. algonquin Alexander, 1915
- T. apache Alexander, 1916
- T. aplecta Alexander, 1946
- T. beatula Osten Sacken, 1877
- T. bituberculata Doane, 1901
- T. breedlovei Alexander, 1969
- T. cahuilla Alexander, 1920
- T. capistrano Alexander, 1946
- T. cazieri Alexander, 1942
- T. cimarronensis Rogers, 1931
- T. desertorum Alexander, 1946
- T. dis Alexander, 1962
- T. dorsolineata Doane, 1901
- T. frommeri Alexander, 1973
- T. furialis Alexander, 1946
- T. geronimo Alexander, 1946
- T. gertschi Alexander, 1963
- T. guasa Alexander, 1916
- T. haplotricha Alexander, 1934
- T. hedgesi Alexander, 1961
- T. kennedyana Alexander, 1965
- T. kraussi Alexander, 1946
- T. longifimbriata Alexander, 1936
- T. macrophallus (Dietz, 1918)
- T. malkini Alexander, 1955
- T. mallophora Alexander, 1936
- T. mayedai Alexander, 1946
- T. megalodonta Alexander, 1946
- T. mulaiki Alexander, 1948
- T. oropezoides Johnson, 1909
- T. pachyrhinoides Alexander, 1915
- T. politonigra Alexander, 1953
- T. polytricha Alexander, 1932
- T. prolixa Alexander, 1947
- T. puncticollis (Dietz, 1918)
- T. religiosa Alexander, 1946
- T. repulsa Alexander, 1943
- T. retinens Alexander, 1946
- T. sanctaecruzae Alexander, 1973
- T. sayloriana Alexander, 1946
- T. selanderi Alexander, 1956
- T. stonei Alexander, 1965
- T. subapache Alexander, 1947
- T. unimaculata (Loew, 1864)
- T. uxoria Alexander, 1946
- T. vultuosa Alexander, 1946

== Tipula subg. Triplicitipula Alexander, 1965 ==
- T. acuta Doane, 1901
- T. aequalis Doane, 1901
- T. barnesiana Alexander, 1963
- T. bellamyi Alexander, 1965
- T. colei Alexander, 1942
- T. doaneiana Alexander, 1919
- T. flavoumbrosa Alexander, 1918
- T. hoogstraali Alexander, 1940
- T. idiotricha Alexander, 1965
- T. integra Alexander, 1962
- T. justa Alexander, 1935
- T. lygropis Alexander, 1920
- T. minensis Alexander, 1936
- T. nastjasta Yang & Yang, 1991
- T. perlongipes Johnson, 1909
- T. planicornis Doane, 1912
- T. praecisa Loew, 1872
- T. pubera Loew, 1864
- T. quaylii Doane, 1909
- T. sanctaeritae Alexander, 1946
- T. silvestra Doane, 1909
- T. simplex Doane, 1901
- T. subtilis Doane, 1901
- T. sylvicola Doane, 1912
- T. triplex Walker, 1848
- T. umbrosa Loew, 1863
- T. variipetiolaris Alexander, 1933
- T. vestigipennis Doane, 1908
- T. williamsii Doane, 1909

== Tipula subg. Vestiplex Bezzi, 1924 ==
- T. acudorsata Alexander, 1970
- T. adungensis Alexander, 1963
- T. aestiva Savchenko, 1960
- T. aldrichiana Alexander, 1929
- T. alyxis Alexander, 1963
- T. ambigua Savchenko, 1964
- T. apicifurcata Yang & Yang, 1992
- T. aptera Savchenko, 1955
- T. arctica Curtis, 1835
- T. arisanensis Edwards, 1921
- T. auriculatalobata Starkevich, Men and Saldaitis, 2019
- T. avicularia Edwards, 1928
- T. avicularoides Alexander, 1936
- T. balioptera Loew, 1863
- T. baliopteroides Alexander, 1945
- T. bergrothiana Alexander, 1918
- T. bhutia Alexander, 1959
- T. bicalcarata Savchenko, 1965
- T. bicornigera Alexander, 1938
- T. bicornuta Alexander, 1920
- T. bisentis Alexander, 1951
- T. biserra Edwards, 1921
- T. borthi Starkevich, Men and Saldaitis, 2019
- T. breviloba Men and Starkevich, 2021
- T. bryceana Alexander, 1964
- T. butvilai Starkevich, Saldaitis and Men, 2019
- T. canadensis Loew, 1864
- T. caroliniana Alexander, 1916
- T. centralis Loew, 1864
- T. chiswellana Alexander, 1964
- T. churchillensis Alexander, 1940
- T. cisalpina Riedel, 1913
- T. coquillettiana Alexander, 1924
- T. coronifera Savchenko, 1960
- T. cremeri Alexander, 1941
- T. crolina Dufour, 1992
- T. czizekiana Alexander, 1970
- T. dechangensis Men, Starkevich and Saldaitis, 2021
- T. deserrata Alexander, 1934
- T. dhalma Starkevich and Podenas, 2011
- T. distifurca Alexander, 1942
- T. divisotergata Alexander, 1932
- T. dobrotworskyana Alexander, 1968
- T. doron Alexander, 1961
- T. erectiloba Alexander, 1940
- T. eurydice Alexander, 1961
- T. excisa Schummel, 1833
- T. exechostyla Alexander, 1964
- T. factiosa Alexander, 1940
- T. fernandezi Theowald, 1972
- T. foliacea Alexander, 1924
- T. fragilicornis Riedel, 1913
- T. franzi Mannheims, 1950
- T. freemanana Alexander, 1963
- T. fultonensis Alexander, 1918
- T. gandharva Alexander, 1951
- T. gedehana de Meijere, 1911
- T. gongdangensis Men, Starkevich and Saldaitis, 2021
- T. grahami Alexander, 1933
- T. guibifida Yang & Yang, 1992
- T. hadrostyla Alexander, 1970
- T. halteroptera Alexander, 1951
- T. hasiya Pilipenko and Starkevich, 2020
- T. hemapterandra Bezzi, 1924
- T. hemiptera Mannheims, 1953
- T. himalayensis Brunetti, 1911
- T. hirticeps Savchenko, 1960
- T. hortorum Linnaeus, 1758
- T. hugueniniana Alexander, 1971
- T. immota Alexander, 1935
- T. immsiana Alexander, 1970
- T. inaequidentata Alexander, 1927
- T. inaequifurca Alexander, 1949
- T. inquinata Alexander, 1938
- T. jakut Alexander, 1934
- T. jiangi Yang & Yang, 1991
- T. kamchatkana Alexander, 1934
- T. kashkarovi Stackelberg, 1944
- T. kiritshenkoi Savchenko, 1960
- T. kosswigi Mannheims, 1953
- T. kozlovi Savchenko, 1960
- T. kumaonensis Alexander, 1961
- T. kuwayamai Alexander, 1921
- T. kwanhsienana Alexander, 1934
- T. laccata Lundstrom & Frey, 1916
- T. laocai Pilipenko, Starkevich and Gavryushin, 2019
- T. leigongshanensis Men and Young, 2017
- T. leucophaea Doane, 1901
- T. leucoprocta Mik, 1889
- T. longarmata Yang & Yang, 1999
- T. longitudinalis Nielsen, 1929
- T. longiventris Loew, 1863
- T. malla Alexander, 1959
- T. maoershanensis Men and Young, 2017
- T. maoxianensis Starkevich, Men and Saldaitis, 2019
- T. medioflava Yang & Yang, 1999
- T. mediovittata Mik, 1889
- T. mitchelli Edwards, 1927
- T. montana Curtis, 1834
- T. nestor Alexander, 1934
- T. nigroapicalis Brunetti, 1911
- T. nigrocostata Alexander, 1925
- T. nokonis Alexander, 1928
- T. nubeculosa Meigen, 1804
- T. nubila Savchenko, 1960
- T. opilionimorpha Savchenko, 1955
- T. optanda Alexander, 1935
- T. pallidicosta Pierre, 1924
- T. pallitergata Alexander, 1934
- T. papandajanica Edwards, 1932
- T. parvapiculata Alexander, 1934
- T. pauxilla Savchenko, 1960
- T. perretti Alexander, 1928
- T. platymera Walker, 1856
- T. pleuracantha Edwards, 1928
- T. proboscelongata Yang & Yang, 1991
- T. quadricorna Ren, Li and Yang, 2021
- T. quasimarmoratipennis Brunetti, 1912
- T. rana Alexander, 1959
- T. ravana Alexander, 1953
- T. relicta Dia & Theowald, 1982
- T. reposita Walker, 1848
- T. rhimma Alexander, 1961
- T. riedeliana Mannheims, 1953
- T. rongtoensis Alexander, 1963
- T. saccai Mannheims, 1950
- T. scandens Edwards, 1928
- T. schizophallus Alexander, 1973
- T. schummelana Alexander, 1968
- T. scripta Meigen, 1830
- T. semivittata Savchenko, 1960
- T. serricauda Alexander, 1914
- T. serridens Alexander, 1920
- T. serrulata Loew, 1864
- T. setigera Savchenko, 1960
- T. sexspinosa Strobl, 1898
- T. siddartha Alexander, 1961
- T. siebkeana Alexander, 1970
- T. sintenisi Lackschewitz, 1933
- T. spathacea Alexander, 1963
- T. styligera Alexander, 1927
- T. subapterogyne Alexander, 1920
- T. subbifida Alexander, 1953
- T. subcentralis Alexander, 1918
- T. subscripta Edwards, 1928
- T. subtestata Alexander, 1938
- T. subtincta Brunetti, 1912
- T. tacomicola Alexander, 1949
- T. takahashiana Alexander, 1938
- T. tanycera Alexander, 1961
- T. tardigrada Edwards, 1928
- T. tchukchi Alexander, 1934
- T. teshionis Alexander, 1921
- T. testata Alexander, 1935
- T. theowaldana Alexander, 1964
- T. tillyardana Alexander, 1970
- T. tumididens Savchenko, 1988
- T. tumulta Alexander, 1934
- T. tuta Alexander, 1936
- T. vaillanti Theowald, 1977
- T. verecunda Alexander, 1924
- T. virgatula Riedel, 1913
- T. wahlgrenana Alexander, 1968
- T. walkeriana Alexander, 1971
- T. wrangeliana Stackelberg, 1944
- T. xanthocephala Yang & Yang, 1991
- T. xinduqiaoensis Starkevich, Men and Saldaitis, 2019
- T. xingshana Yang & Yang, 1997
- T. yunnanensis Alexander, 1942
- T. zayulensis Alexander, 1963
- T. zhengkuni Men and Starkevich, 2021

== Tipula subg. Yamatotipula Matsumura, 1916 ==
- T. afriberia Theowald & Oosterbroek, 1980
- T. aino Alexander, 1914
- T. albifrons Savchenko, 1967
- T. albocaudata Doane, 1901
- T. amblyostyla Savchenko, 1968
- T. anceps Savchenko, 1965
- T. aprilina Alexander, 1918
- T. aspidoptera Alexander, 1916
- T. aviceniana Savchenko, 1954
- T. barbarensis Theowald & Oosterbroek, 1980
- T. bhoteana Alexander, 1961
- T. bitumidosa Alexander, 1971
- T. brevifurcata Alexander, 1926
- T. caesia Schummel, 1833
- T. caloptera Loew, 1863
- T. calopteroides Alexander, 1919
- T. carsoni Alexander, 1963
- T. catawbiana Alexander, 1940
- T. caucasimontana Savchenko, 1955
- T. cayuga Alexander, 1915
- T. cervicula Doane, 1901
- T. chonsaniana Alexander, 1945
- T. cimmeria Speiser, 1909
- T. coerulescens Lackschewitz, 1923
- T. cognata Doane, 1901
- T. colteri Alexander, 1943
- T. comanche Alexander, 1916
- T. concava Alexander, 1926
- T. conspicua Dietz, 1917
- T. continentalis Alexander, 1941
- T. couckei Tonnoir, 1921
- T. dejecta Walker, 1856
- T. eluta Loew, 1863
- T. fendleri Mannheims, 1963
- T. fenestrella Theowald, 1980
- T. floridensis Alexander, 1926
- T. footeana Alexander, 1961
- T. fraterna Loew, 1864
- T. freyana Lackschewitz, 1936
- T. fulvilineata Doane, 1912
- T. furca Walker, 1848
- T. glendenningi Alexander, 1943
- T. grenfelli Alexander, 1928
- T. guentheri Oosterbroek, 1994
- T. hamata Savchenko, 1953
- T. hexacantha Alexander, 1961
- T. incana Savchenko, 1955
- T. iranensis Theowald, 1978
- T. iroquois Alexander, 1915
- T. jacintoensis Alexander, 1946
- T. jacobus Alexander, 1931
- T. jamaicensis Alexander, 1928
- T. jucunda Savchenko, 1961
- T. kamikochiensis Alexander, 1941
- T. kennicotti Alexander, 1915
- T. koikei Alexander, 1971
- T. lanei Alexander, 1940
- T. latemarginata Alexander, 1921
- T. lateralis Meigen, 1804
- T. lionota Holmgren, 1883
- T. lucifera Savchenko, 1954
- T. ludoviciana Alexander, 1919
- T. machidai Alexander, 1933
- T. maculipleura Alexander, 1927
- T. manahatta Alexander, 1919
- T. marginella Theowald, 1980
- T. meridiana Doane, 1912
- T. misakana Alexander, 1953
- T. moesta Riedel, 1919
- T. montium Egger, 1863
- T. nephophila Alexander, 1940
- T. nigrolamina Alexander, 1950
- T. nocticostata Alexander, 1971
- T. nova Walker, 1848
- T. noveboracensis Alexander, 1919
- T. nuntia Alexander, 1946
- T. ompoensis Alexander, 1945
- T. osceola Alexander, 1927
- T. patagiata Alexander, 1924
- T. pierrei Tonnoir, 1921
- T. poliocephala Alexander, 1922
- T. protrusa Alexander, 1934
- T. pruinosa Wiedemann, 1817
- T. quadrivittata Staeger, 1840
- T. recticauda Savchenko, 1953
- T. reversa Alexander, 1956
- T. riedeli Mannheims, 1952
- T. roya Dufour, 2003
- T. sackeniana Alexander, 1918
- T. sayi Alexander, 1911
- T. sempiterna Alexander, 1933
- T. setosipennis Alexander, 1920
- T. shevtshenkoi Savchenko, 1954
- T. solitaria Savchenko, 1953
- T. spernax Osten Sacken, 1877
- T. strepens Loew, 1863
- T. subeluta Johnson, 1913
- T. subincana Savchenko, 1961
- T. submontium Theowald & Oosterbroek, 1981
- T. subnova Alexander, 1937
- T. subprotrusa Savchenko, 1955
- T. subreversa Alexander, 1956
- T. subvirgo Alexander, 1951
- T. succincta Alexander, 1940
- T. sulphurea Doane, 1901
- T. tenebrosa Coquillett, 1900
- T. tenuilinea Alexander, 1959
- T. tephrocephala Loew, 1864
- T. tricolor Fabricius, 1775
- T. tsurugiana Alexander, 1953
- T. vicina Dietz, 1917
- T. virgo Osten Sacken, 1886
- T. xanthostigma Dietz, 1917
- T. yamamuriana Alexander, 1926

== Unplaced ==
- T. baileyi Alexander, 1953
- T. bipendula Alexander, 1934
- T. bispathifera Savchenko, 1960
- T. cladomera Alexander, 1936
- T. compressiloba Alexander, 1938
- T. coxitalis Alexander, 1935
- T. demeijerei Edwards, 1915
- T. depressiloba Oosterbroek & Theowald, 1992
- T. flavicosta Alexander, 1915
- T. formosicola Alexander, 1920
- T. frigida Walker, 1848
- T. gressitti Alexander, 1935
- T. idiopyga Alexander, 1949
- T. imanoensis Alexander, 1954
- T. incisurata Alexander, 1940
- T. inordinans Walker, 1859
- T. johanseni Alexander, 1919
- T. kusunokiana Alexander, 1955
- T. lanio Alexander, 1945
- T. liui Alexander, 1941
- T. maculatipennis Say, 1824
- T. melanonotalis Alexander, 1954
- T. microcellula Alexander, 1923
- T. nippoalpina Alexander, 1931
- T. opinata Alexander, 1940
- T. otiosa Alexander, 1924
- T. palesoides Alexander, 1942
- T. percommoda Alexander, 1938
- T. perelegans Alexander, 1921
- T. perlata Alexander, 1938
- T. pluriguttata Alexander, 1920
- T. praeses Alexander, 1942
- T. prolongata Alexander, 1936
- T. puncticornis Macquart, 1850
- T. repugnans Alexander, 1940
- T. reservata Alexander, 1941
- T. sexlobata Alexander, 1938
- T. spectata Alexander, 1940
- T. sternosetosa Alexander, 1940
- T. sternotuberculata Alexander, 1935
- T. strix Alexander, 1918
- T. subdepressa Alexander, 1941
- T. subnata Alexander, 1949
- T. subpolaris Alexander, 1919
- T. subyusou Alexander, 1929
- T. superciliosa Alexander, 1924
- T. tantula Alexander, 1924
- T. terebrata Edwards, 1921
- T. trimaculata (Emmons, 1854)
- T. tropica de Meijere, 1913
- T. varaha Alexander, 1953
- T. xanthomelaena Edwards, 1926
- T. yanoana Alexander, 1953
- T. yusou Alexander, 1914
- T. yusouoides Alexander, 1929
