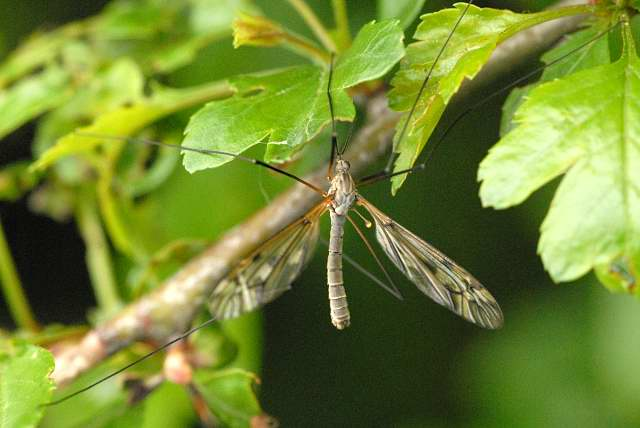
- Tipula subnodicornis male

Scientific classification
- Kingdom: Animalia
- Phylum: Arthropoda
- Clade: Pancrustacea
- Class: Insecta
- Order: Diptera
- Family: Tipulidae
- Genus: Tipula
- Subgenus: Savtshenkia
- Species: T. subnodicornis

Binomial name
- Tipula subnodicornis Zetterstedt, 1833

= Tipula subnodicornis =

Species of fly

Tipula subnodicornis is a species of cranefly.

== Distribution ==
Palaearctic.
