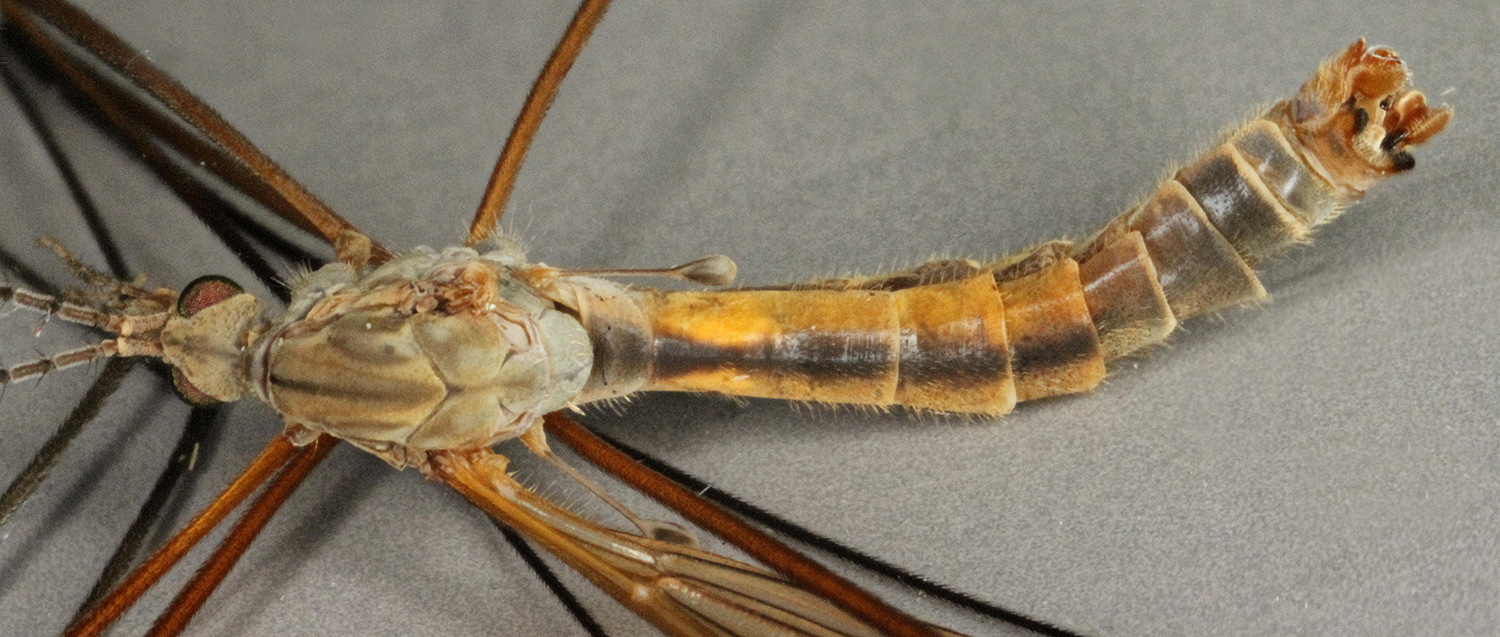
- Tipula luteipennis North Wales

Scientific classification
- Kingdom: Animalia
- Phylum: Arthropoda
- Clade: Pancrustacea
- Class: Insecta
- Order: Diptera
- Family: Tipulidae
- Genus: Tipula
- Subgenus: Platytipula
- Species: T. luteipennis

Binomial name
- Tipula luteipennis Meigen, 1830

= Tipula luteipennis =

Species of fly

Tipula luteipennis is a species of fly in the family Tipulidae. It is found in the Palearctic.
