= Tipula ignobilis =

Scientific classification
- Kingdom: Animalia
- Phylum: Arthropoda
- Clade: Pancrustacea
- Class: Insecta
- Order: Diptera
- Family: Tipulidae
- Genus: Tipula
- Subgenus: Savtshenkia
- Species: T. ignobilis

Binomial name
- Tipula ignobilis Loew, 1863

Species of fly

Tipula ignobilis is a species of large crane fly in the family Tipulidae, found in Canada and the United States.
