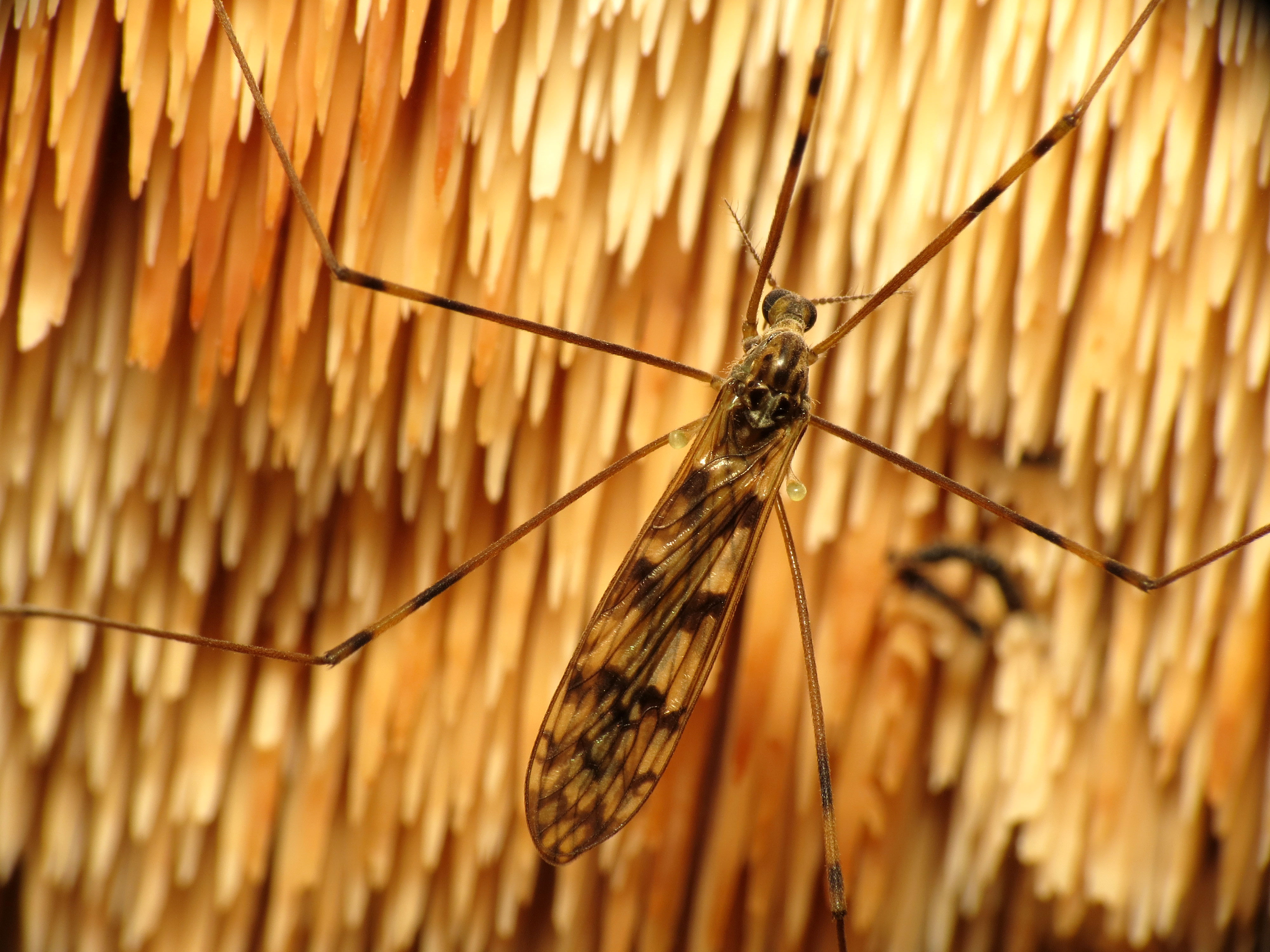

Scientific classification
- Kingdom: Animalia
- Phylum: Arthropoda
- Clade: Pancrustacea
- Class: Insecta
- Order: Diptera
- Family: Tipulidae
- Genus: Tipula
- Subgenus: Pterelachisus
- Species: T. trivittata

Binomial name
- Tipula trivittata Say, 1823

= Tipula trivittata =

Species of fly

Tipula trivittata is a species of large crane fly in the family Tipulidae.

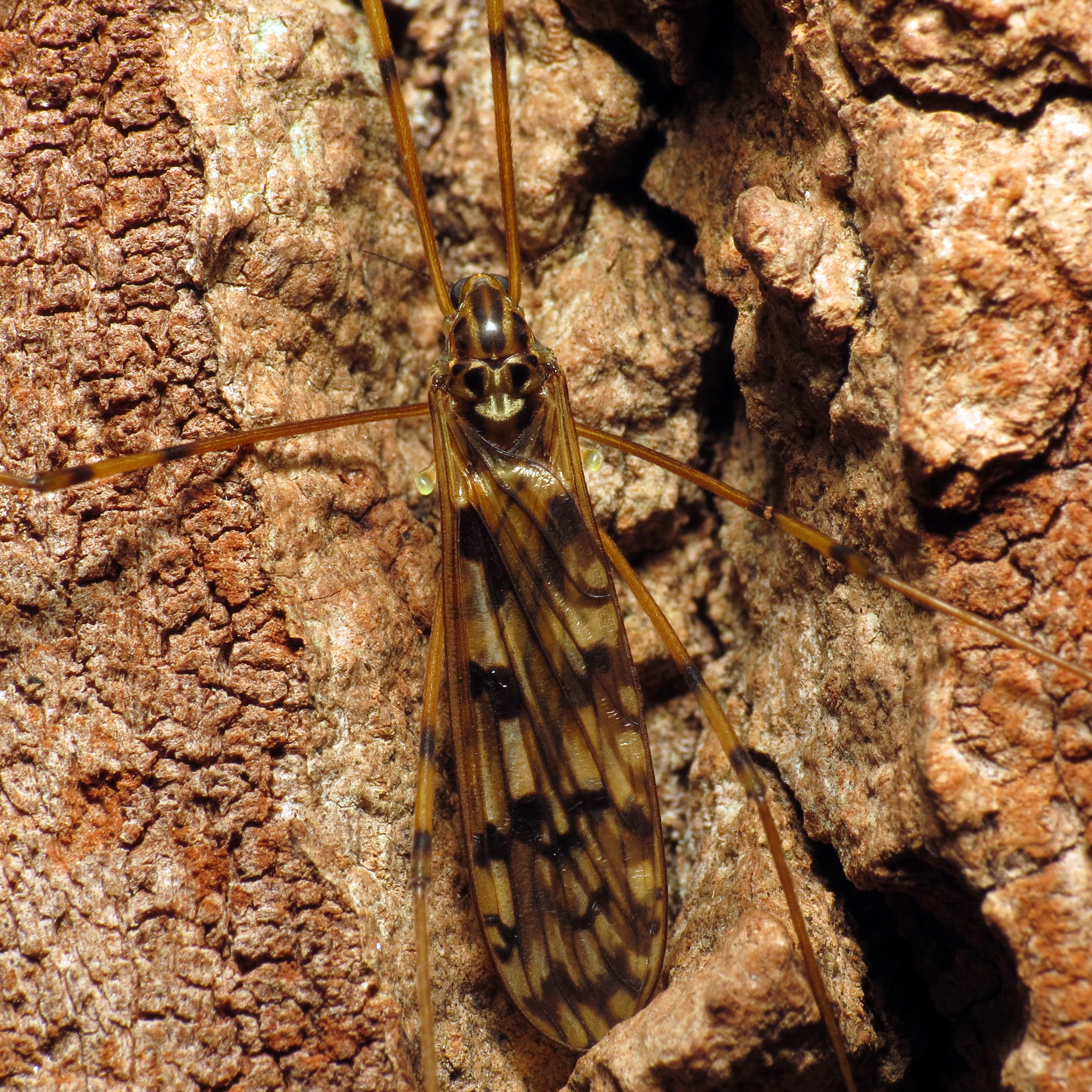
