= Tipula senega =

Scientific classification
- Kingdom: Animalia
- Phylum: Arthropoda
- Clade: Pancrustacea
- Class: Insecta
- Order: Diptera
- Family: Tipulidae
- Genus: Tipula
- Subgenus: Lindnerina
- Species: T. senega

Binomial name
- Tipula senega Alexander, 1915

Synonyms
- Tipula pallida Loew, 1863

Species of fly

Tipula senega is a species of large crane fly in the family Tipulidae.
