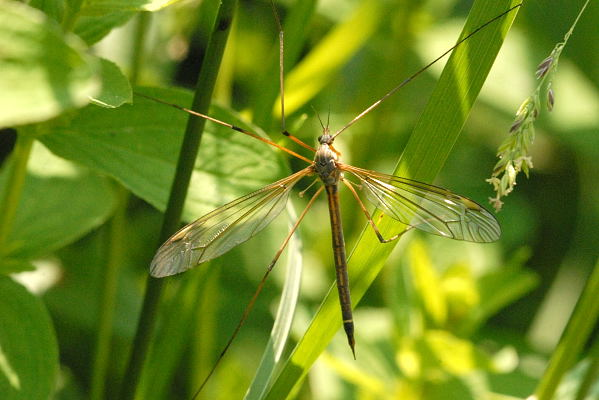
- Tipula fascipennis female

Scientific classification
- Kingdom: Animalia
- Phylum: Arthropoda
- Clade: Pancrustacea
- Class: Insecta
- Order: Diptera
- Family: Tipulidae
- Genus: Tipula
- Subgenus: Dendrotipula
- Species: T. flavolineata

Binomial name
- Tipula flavolineata Meigen, 1804

Synonyms
- Tipula latevittata Schummel, 1833; Tipula antennata Schummel, 1833; Tipula longicornis Curtis, 1834

= Tipula flavolineata =

Species of fly

Tipula fascipennis is a species of true craneflies.

== Distribution ==
Widespread throughout the Palaearctic.
