= Tipula obsoleta =

Scientific classification
- Kingdom: Animalia
- Phylum: Arthropoda
- Clade: Pancrustacea
- Class: Insecta
- Order: Diptera
- Family: Tipulidae
- Genus: Tipula
- Subgenus: Savtshenkia
- Species: T. obsoleta

Binomial name
- Tipula obsoleta Meigen, 1818

Synonyms
- Tipula clandestina Meigen, 1818

Species of fly

Tipula obsoleta is a species of cranefly.

== Distribution ==
Widespread throughout the West Palaearctic.
