= Tipula jacobus =

Scientific classification
- Missing taxonomy template (fix): Tipula (Yamatotipula)
- Species: T. jacobus

Binomial name
- Tipula jacobus Alexander, 1930

Species of fly

Tipula jacobus is a species of large crane fly in the family Tipulidae, found in Canada and the United States.
