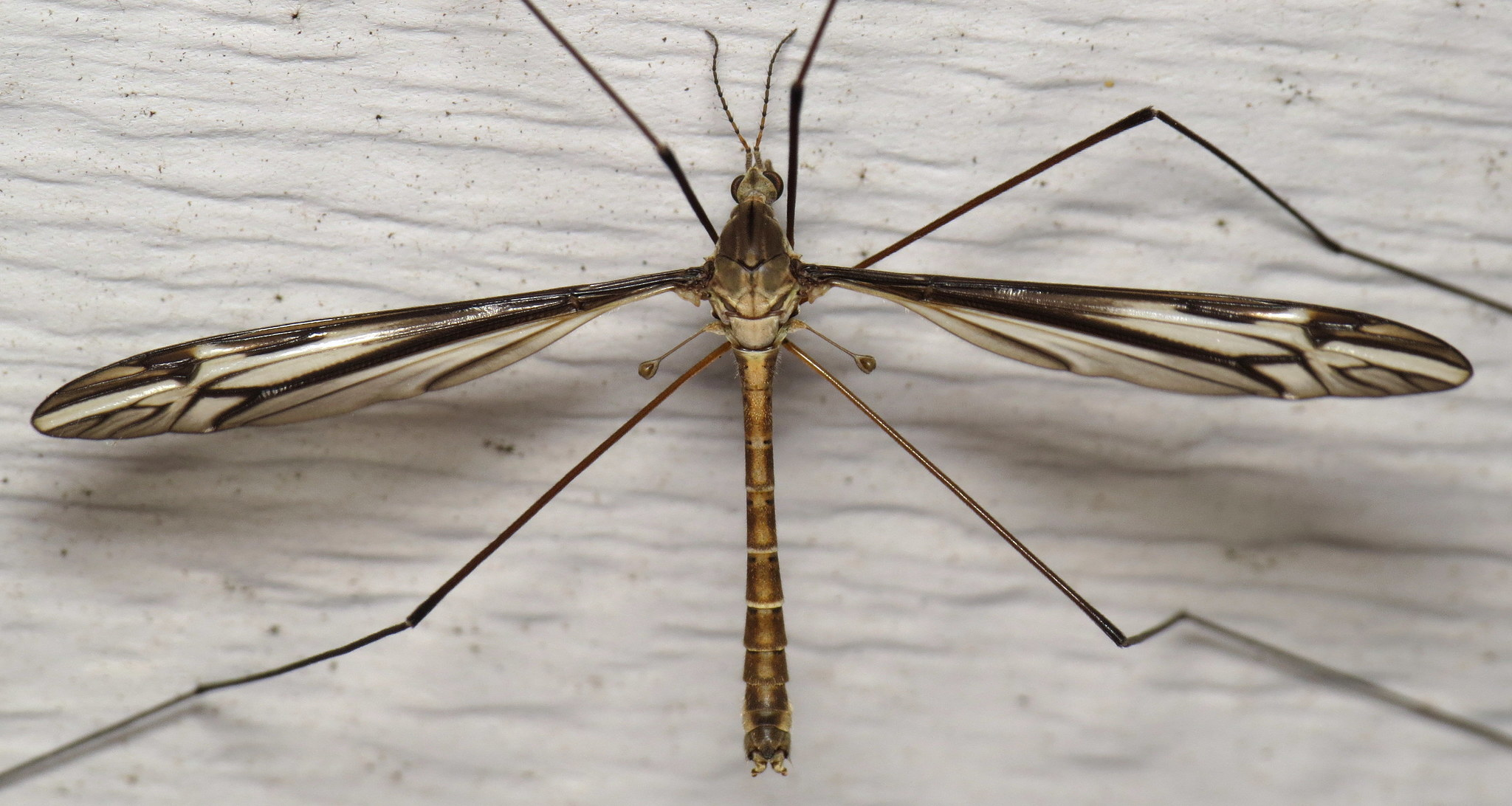

Scientific classification
- Kingdom: Animalia
- Phylum: Arthropoda
- Clade: Pancrustacea
- Class: Insecta
- Order: Diptera
- Family: Tipulidae
- Genus: Tipula
- Subgenus: Yamatotipula
- Species: T. furca

Binomial name
- Tipula furca Walker

= Tipula furca =

Species of fly

Tipula furca is a species of large crane fly in the family Tipulidae, found in Canada and the United States.

== Subspecies ==
These two subspecies belong to the species Tipula furca:

- Tipula furca credula
- Tipula furca furca
