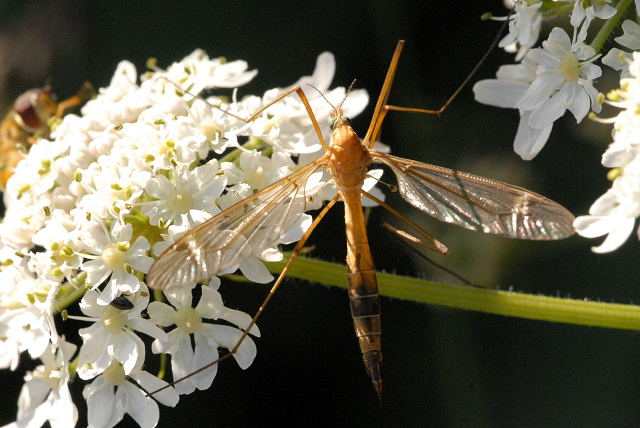
- Tipula stigmatella female

Scientific classification
- Kingdom: Animalia
- Phylum: Arthropoda
- Clade: Pancrustacea
- Class: Insecta
- Order: Diptera
- Family: Tipulidae
- Genus: Tipula
- Subgenus: Mediotipula
- Species: T. stigmatella

Binomial name
- Tipula stigmatella Schummel, 1833

Synonyms
- Tipula bidens Bergroth, 1888; Tipula appressocaudata Strobl, 1902

= Tipula stigmatella =

Species of fly

Tipula stigmatella is a species of cranefly.

== Distribution ==
West Palaearctic.
