= Tipula pacifica =

Scientific classification
- Kingdom: Animalia
- Phylum: Arthropoda
- Clade: Pancrustacea
- Class: Insecta
- Order: Diptera
- Family: Tipulidae
- Genus: Tipula
- Subgenus: Sinotipula
- Species: T. pacifica

Binomial name
- Tipula pacifica Doane, 1912

Species of fly

Tipula pacifica is a species of large crane fly in the family Tipulidae. It is found in British Columbia, south to California.
