= Tipula pustulata =

Scientific classification
- Kingdom: Animalia
- Phylum: Arthropoda
- Clade: Pancrustacea
- Class: Insecta
- Order: Diptera
- Family: Tipulidae
- Genus: Tipula
- Subgenus: Lunatipula
- Species: T. pustulata

Binomial name
- Tipula pustulata Pierre, 1920

Species of fly

Tipula pustulata is a species of True Craneflies.

== Distribution ==
Andorra, Belgium, France, Germany, Portugal & Spain.
