= Tipula hermannia =

Scientific classification
- Kingdom: Animalia
- Phylum: Arthropoda
- Clade: Pancrustacea
- Class: Insecta
- Order: Diptera
- Family: Tipulidae
- Genus: Tipula
- Subgenus: Schummelia
- Species: T. hermannia

Binomial name
- Tipula hermannia Alexander, 1915

Synonyms
- Tipula fasciata Loew, 1863

Species of fly

Tipula hermannia is a species in the family Tipulidae ("large crane flies"), in the order Diptera ("flies").
