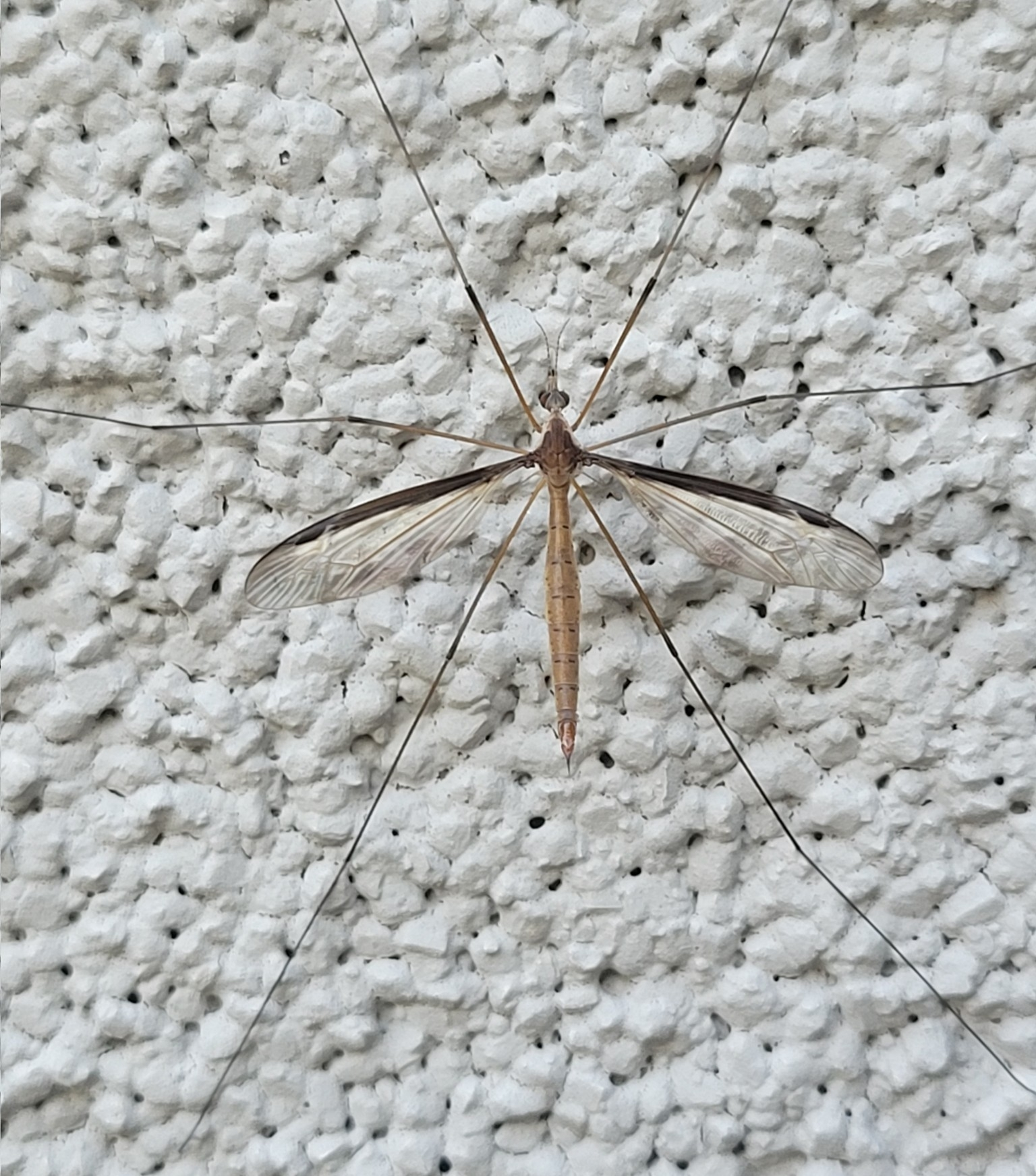
- Tipula sayi, New Jersey

Scientific classification
- Kingdom: Animalia
- Phylum: Arthropoda
- Clade: Pancrustacea
- Class: Insecta
- Order: Diptera
- Family: Tipulidae
- Genus: Tipula
- Subgenus: Yamatotipula
- Species: T. sayi

Binomial name
- Tipula sayi Alexander, 1911

= Tipula sayi =

Species of fly

Tipula sayi is a species of large crane fly in the family Tipulidae, found in Canada, the United States, and Bermuda.
