= Tipula jacintoensis =

Scientific classification
- Kingdom: Animalia
- Phylum: Arthropoda
- Clade: Pancrustacea
- Class: Insecta
- Order: Diptera
- Family: Tipulidae
- Genus: Tipula
- Subgenus: Yamatotipula
- Species: T. jacintoensis

Binomial name
- Tipula jacintoensis Alexander, 1946

Species of fly

Tipula jacintoensis is a species of large crane fly in the family Tipulidae, found in California.
