= Tipula dorsimacula =

Scientific classification
- Kingdom: Animalia
- Phylum: Arthropoda
- Clade: Pancrustacea
- Class: Insecta
- Order: Diptera
- Family: Tipulidae
- Genus: Tipula
- Subgenus: Lunatipula
- Species: T. dorsimacula

Binomial name
- Tipula dorsimacula Walker, 1848

Synonyms
- Tipula beaulieui Dietz, 1921

Species of fly

Tipula dorsimacula is a species of large crane fly in the family Tipulidae.

== Subspecies ==
These two subspecies belong to the species Tipula dorsimacula:

- Tipula dorsimacula dorsimacula Walker, 1848
- Tipula dorsimacula shasta Alexander, 1919
