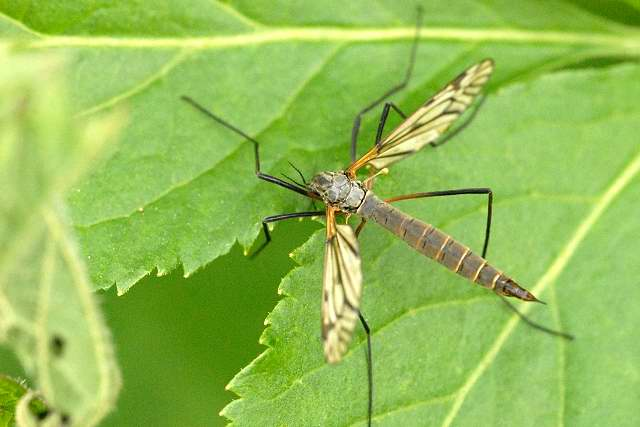

Scientific classification
- Kingdom: Animalia
- Phylum: Arthropoda
- Clade: Pancrustacea
- Class: Insecta
- Order: Diptera
- Family: Tipulidae
- Genus: Tipula
- Subgenus: Vestiplex
- Species: T. excisa

Binomial name
- Tipula excisa Schummel, 1833

Subspecies
- Tipula excisa excisa Schummel, 1833; Tipula excisa carpatica Erhan & Theowald, 1961

Synonyms
- Tipula speculum Zetterstedt, 1838; Tipula subunilineata Zetterstedt, 1838; Tipula octolineata Zetterstedt, 1851; Tipula pyrenaei Theowald, 1968.

= Tipula excisa =

Species of fly

Tipula excisa is a species of true cranefly.

== Distribution ==
Widespread throughout the West Palaearctic and Russian Far East. The subspecies carpatica is only known from alpine Romania.
