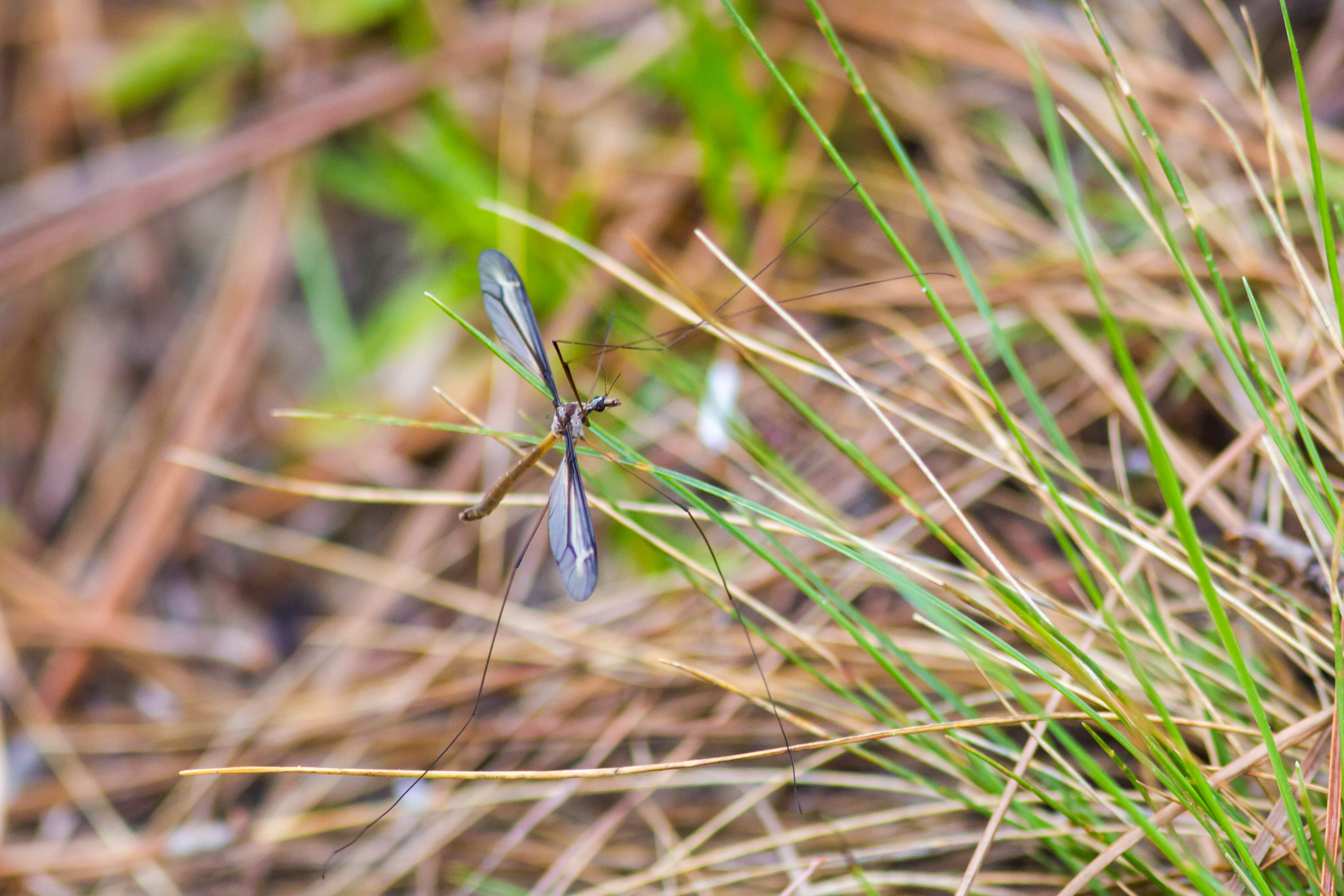

Scientific classification
- Kingdom: Animalia
- Phylum: Arthropoda
- Clade: Pancrustacea
- Class: Insecta
- Order: Diptera
- Family: Tipulidae
- Genus: Tipula
- Subgenus: Yamatotipula
- Species: T. tricolor

Binomial name
- Tipula tricolor Fabricius

Synonyms
- Tipula xanthostigma Dietz, 1917

= Tipula tricolor =

Species of fly

Tipula tricolor is a species of large crane fly in the family Tipulidae, found in Canada and the United States.
