= Tipula lanei =

Scientific classification
- Kingdom: Animalia
- Phylum: Arthropoda
- Clade: Pancrustacea
- Class: Insecta
- Order: Diptera
- Family: Tipulidae
- Genus: Tipula
- Subgenus: Yamatotipula
- Species: T. lanei

Binomial name
- Tipula lanei Alexander, 1940

Species of fly

Tipula lanei is a species of large crane fly in the family Tipulidae, found in the western United States.
