= Tipula borealis =

Scientific classification
- Kingdom: Animalia
- Phylum: Arthropoda
- Clade: Pancrustacea
- Class: Insecta
- Order: Diptera
- Family: Tipulidae
- Genus: Tipula
- Subgenus: Beringotipula
- Species: T. borealis

Binomial name
- Tipula borealis Walker, 1848

Synonyms
- Tipula hebes Lw.

Species of fly

Tipula borealis is a species of large crane fly in the family Tipulidae.
