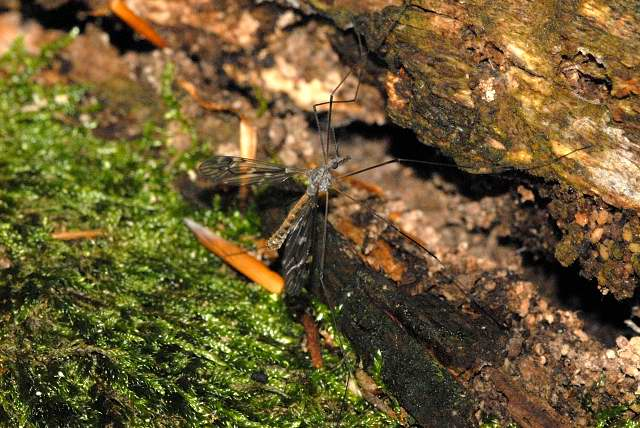

Scientific classification
- Kingdom: Animalia
- Phylum: Arthropoda
- Clade: Pancrustacea
- Class: Insecta
- Order: Diptera
- Family: Tipulidae
- Genus: Tipula
- Subgenus: Yamatotipula
- Species: T. montium

Binomial name
- Tipula montium Egger, 1863

Synonyms
- Tipula aequinoctialis Westhoff, 1879; Tipula lundstromi Strand, 1914; Tipula pseudolateralis Tonnoir, 1921

= Tipula montium =

Species of fly

Tipula montium is a species of cranefly.

== Distribution ==
Widespread throughout the West Palaearctic.
