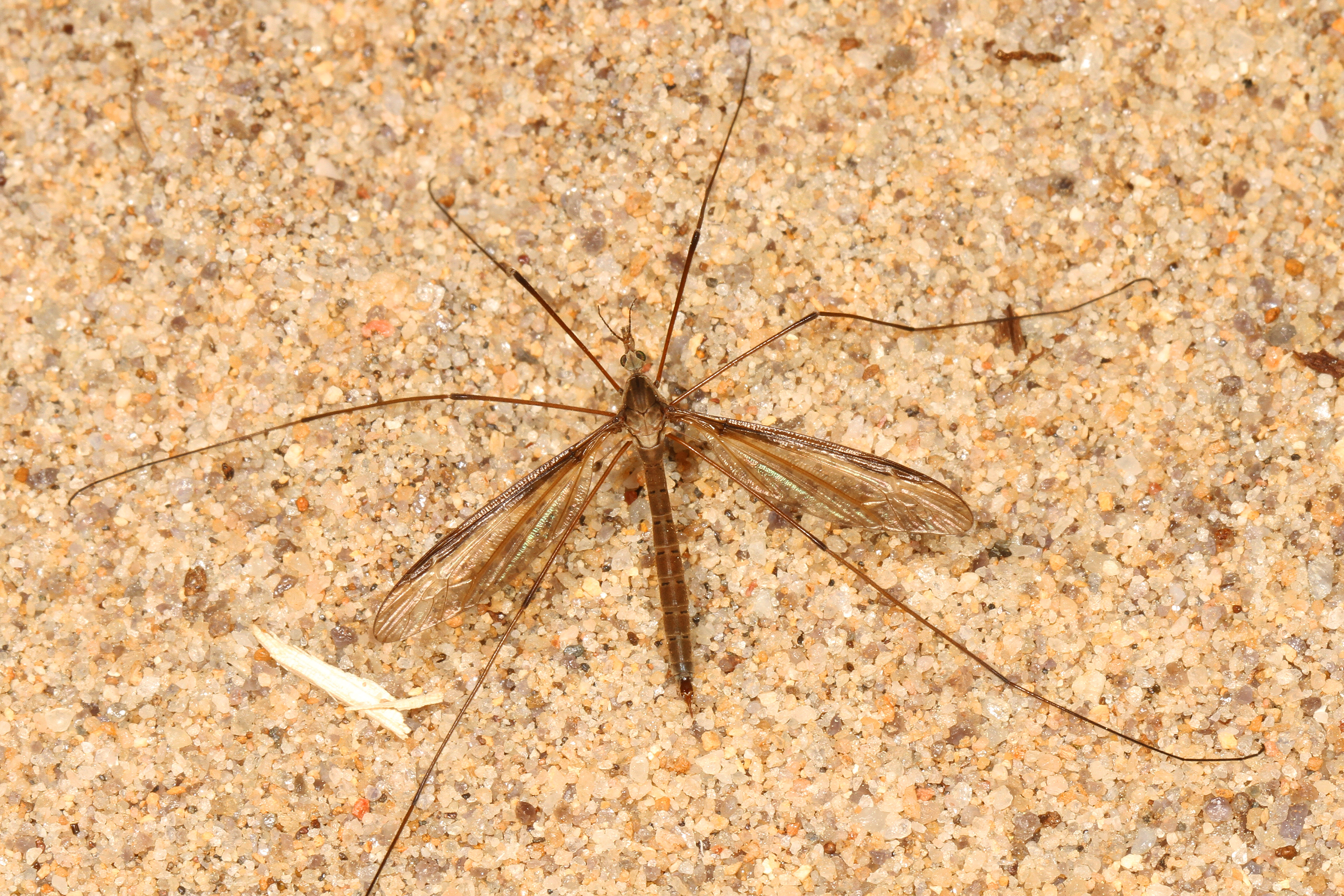

Scientific classification
- Kingdom: Animalia
- Phylum: Arthropoda
- Clade: Pancrustacea
- Class: Insecta
- Order: Diptera
- Family: Tipulidae
- Genus: Tipula
- Subgenus: Vestiplex
- Species: T. longiventris

Binomial name
- Tipula longiventris Loew, 1863

Synonyms
- Tipula stylifera Dietz, 1921

= Tipula longiventris =

Species of fly

Tipula longiventris is a species of large crane fly in the family Tipulidae, found in Canada and the United States.
