= Tipula collaris =

Scientific classification
- Kingdom: Animalia
- Phylum: Arthropoda
- Clade: Pancrustacea
- Class: Insecta
- Order: Diptera
- Family: Tipulidae
- Genus: Tipula
- Subgenus: Nobilotipula
- Species: T. collaris

Binomial name
- Tipula collaris Say, 1823

Species of fly

Tipula collaris is a species of large crane fly in the family Tipulidae, found in Canada and the United States.
