= Tipula schizomera =

Scientific classification
- Kingdom: Animalia
- Phylum: Arthropoda
- Clade: Pancrustacea
- Class: Insecta
- Order: Diptera
- Family: Tipulidae
- Genus: Tipula
- Subgenus: Bellardina
- Species: T. schizomera

Binomial name
- Tipula schizomera Alexander, 1940

Species of fly

Tipula schizomera is a species of large crane fly in the family Tipulidae. It is found in the southwestern United States and Mexico.
