= Tipula valida =

Scientific classification
- Kingdom: Animalia
- Phylum: Arthropoda
- Clade: Pancrustacea
- Class: Insecta
- Order: Diptera
- Family: Tipulidae
- Genus: Tipula
- Subgenus: Lunatipula
- Species: T. valida

Binomial name
- Tipula valida Loew, 1863

Synonyms
- Tipula calva Doane, 1901

Species of fly

Tipula valida is a species of large crane fly in the family Tipulidae.

== Subspecies ==
These two subspecies belong to the species Tipula valida:

- Tipula valida atricornis Alexander, 1940
- Tipula valida valida Loew, 1863
