= Tipula submaculata =

Scientific classification
- Kingdom: Animalia
- Phylum: Arthropoda
- Clade: Pancrustacea
- Class: Insecta
- Order: Diptera
- Family: Tipulidae
- Genus: Tipula
- Subgenus: Lunatipula
- Species: T. submaculata

Binomial name
- Tipula submaculata Loew, 1863

Synonyms
- Tipula cuspidata Doane, 1901

Species of fly

Tipula submaculata is a species of large crane fly in the family Tipulidae.
