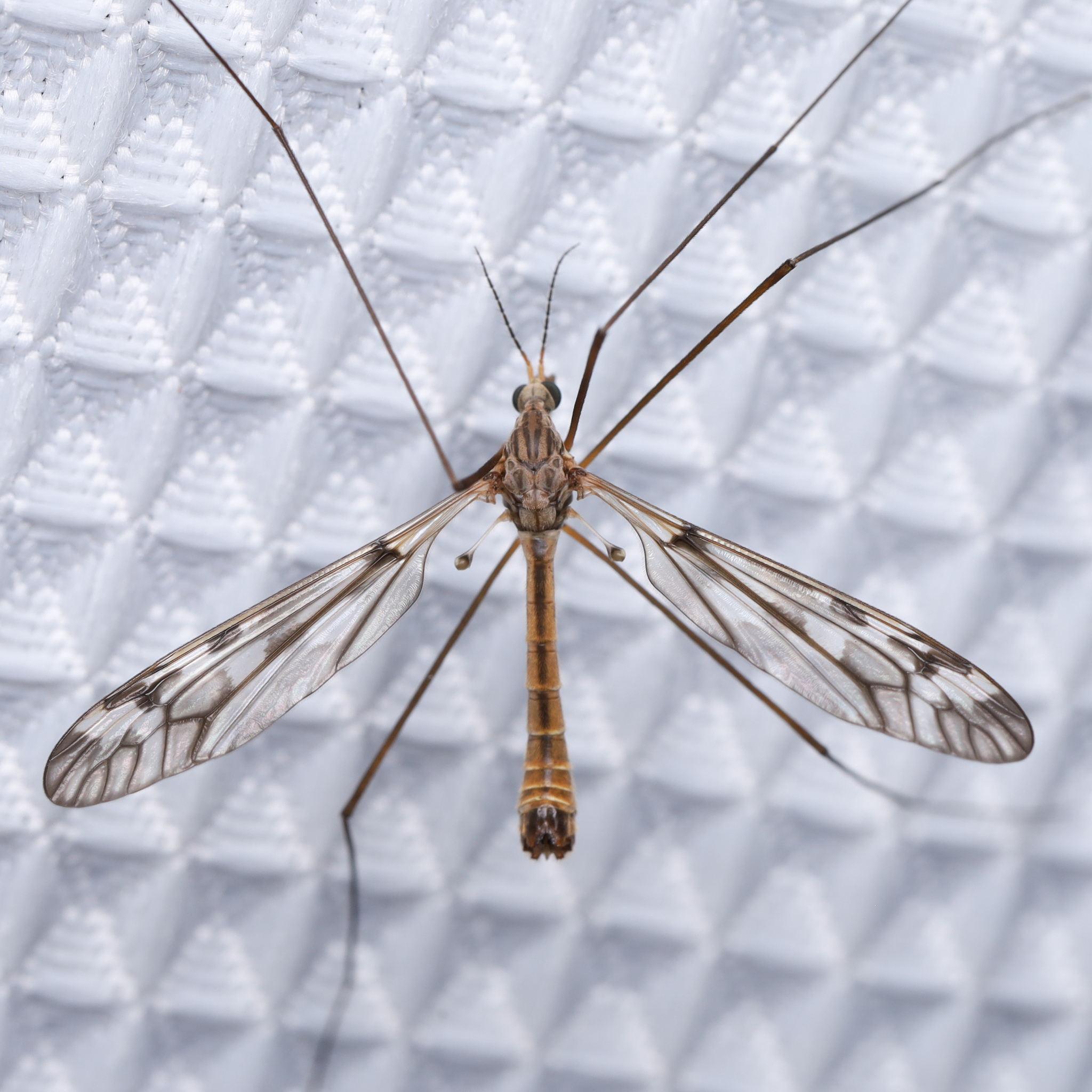
- Male from West Virginia, US

Scientific classification
- Kingdom: Animalia
- Phylum: Arthropoda
- Clade: Pancrustacea
- Class: Insecta
- Order: Diptera
- Family: Tipulidae
- Genus: Tipula
- Subgenus: Pterelachisus
- Species: T. penobscot

Binomial name
- Tipula penobscot Alexander, 1915

= Tipula penobscot =

Species of fly

Tipula penobscot is a species of crane fly in the family Tipulidae found in the United States and Canada.

== Range ==
Tipula penobscot has been found in the following states/provinces: Maine, Minnesota, Michigan, Philadelphia, Virginia, Tennessee, West Virginia, British Columbia, Ontario, Quebec, Nova Scotia, and Newfoundland and Labrador.
