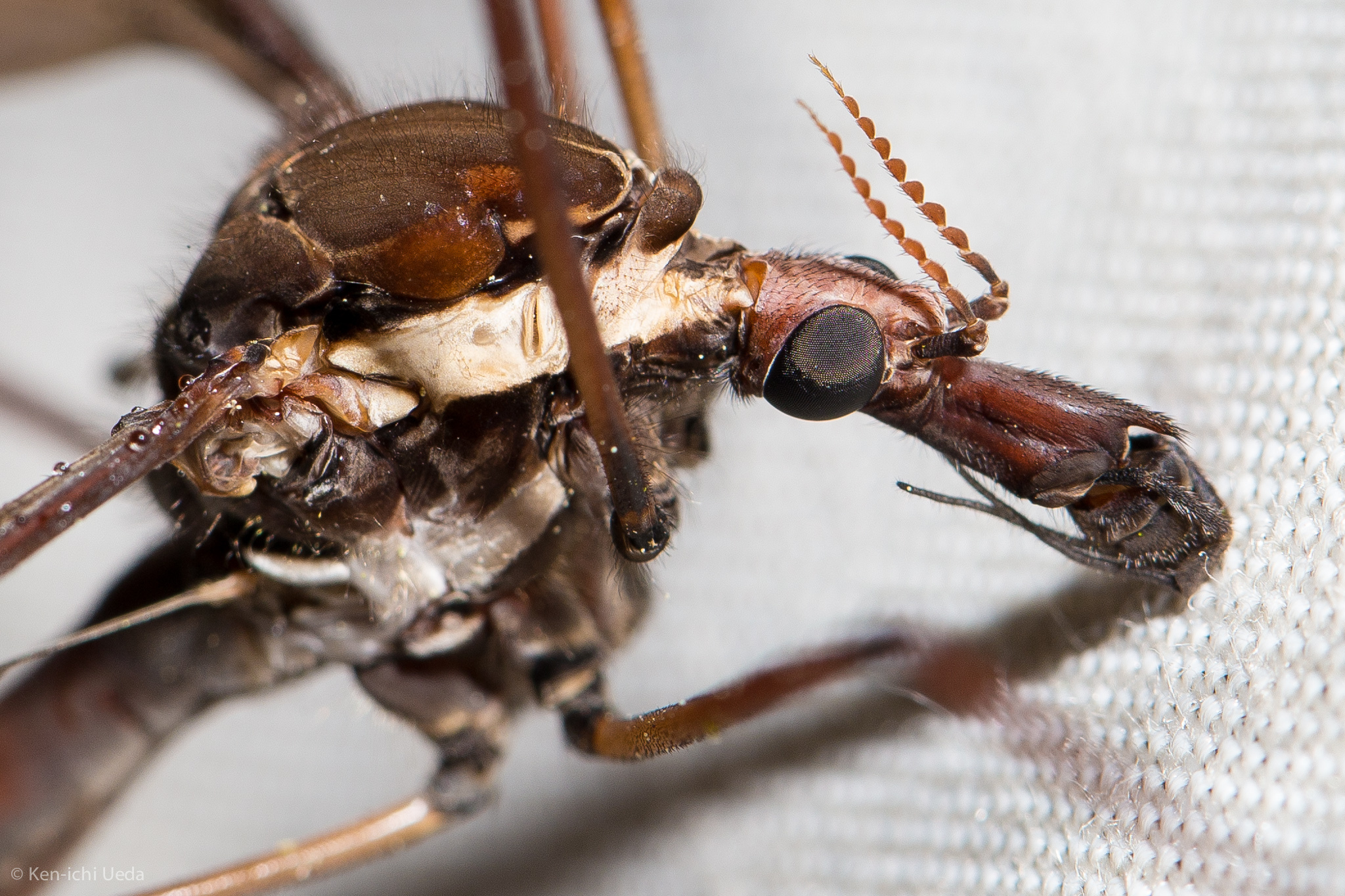
- Holorusia hespera, giant western crane fly, California

Scientific classification
- Kingdom: Animalia
- Phylum: Arthropoda
- Class: Insecta
- Order: Diptera
- Family: Tipulidae
- Subfamily: Tipulinae
- Genus: Holorusia
- Species: H. hespera

Binomial name
- Holorusia hespera Arnaud & Byers, 1990

Synonyms
- Holorusia rubiginosa Alexander, 1920; Tipula rubiginosa Loew, 1863; Tipula grandis (Bergroth, 1888)

= Holorusia hespera =

Species of crane fly

Holorusia hespera, the giant western crane fly, is a species of crane fly in the family Tipulidae. It is found in western North America.

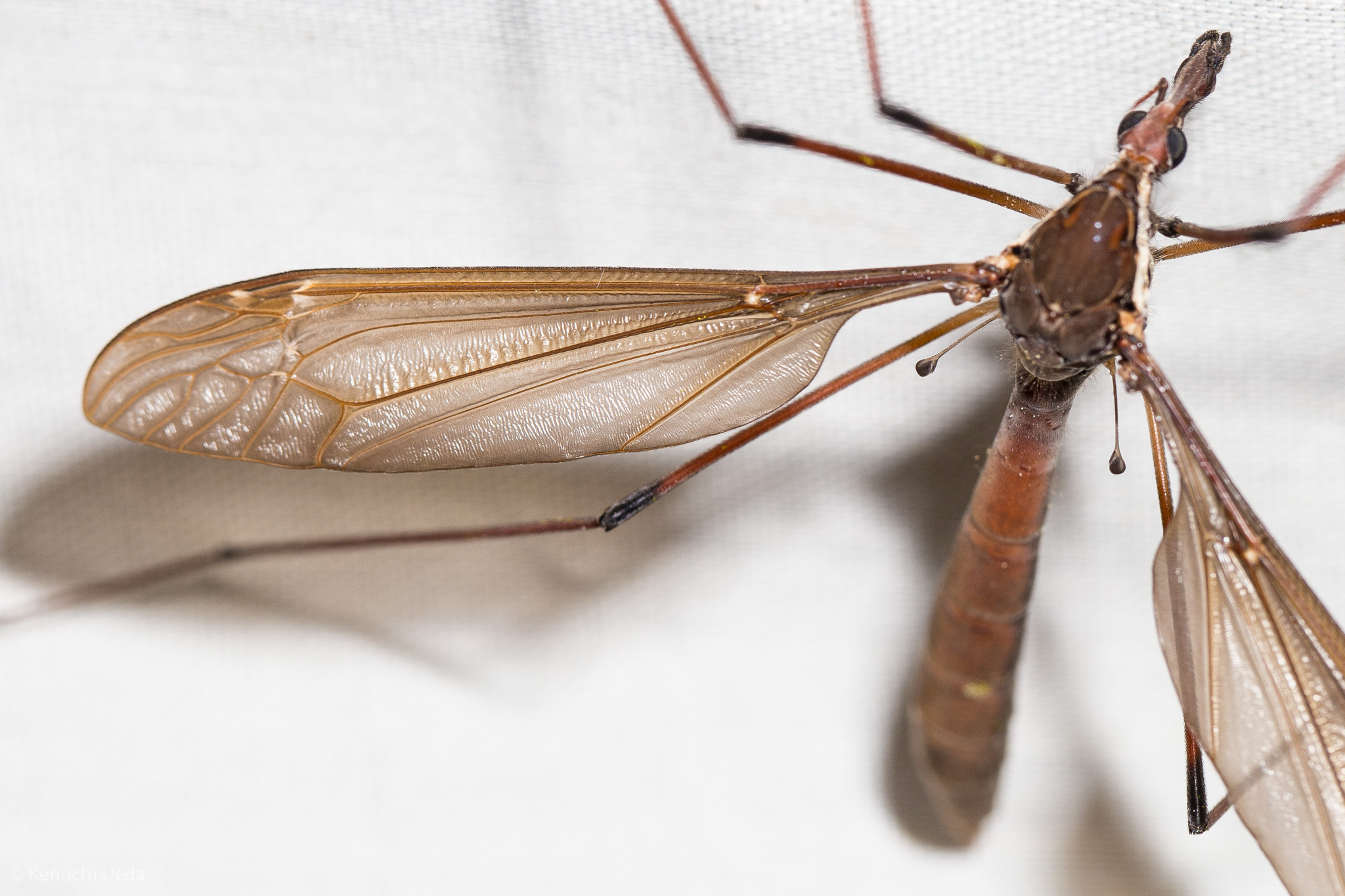
Holorusia hespera, giant western crane fly, California

H. hespera is the largest North American species of cranefly, with wings reaching lengths of 40 mm (1.6 in). The species is noted to lack wing interference patterning on the glossy amber colored wing surface, suggested to be a result of the wing thickness. The wing surfaces are textured with ridging and folds and the coloration is uniform across the wing.
