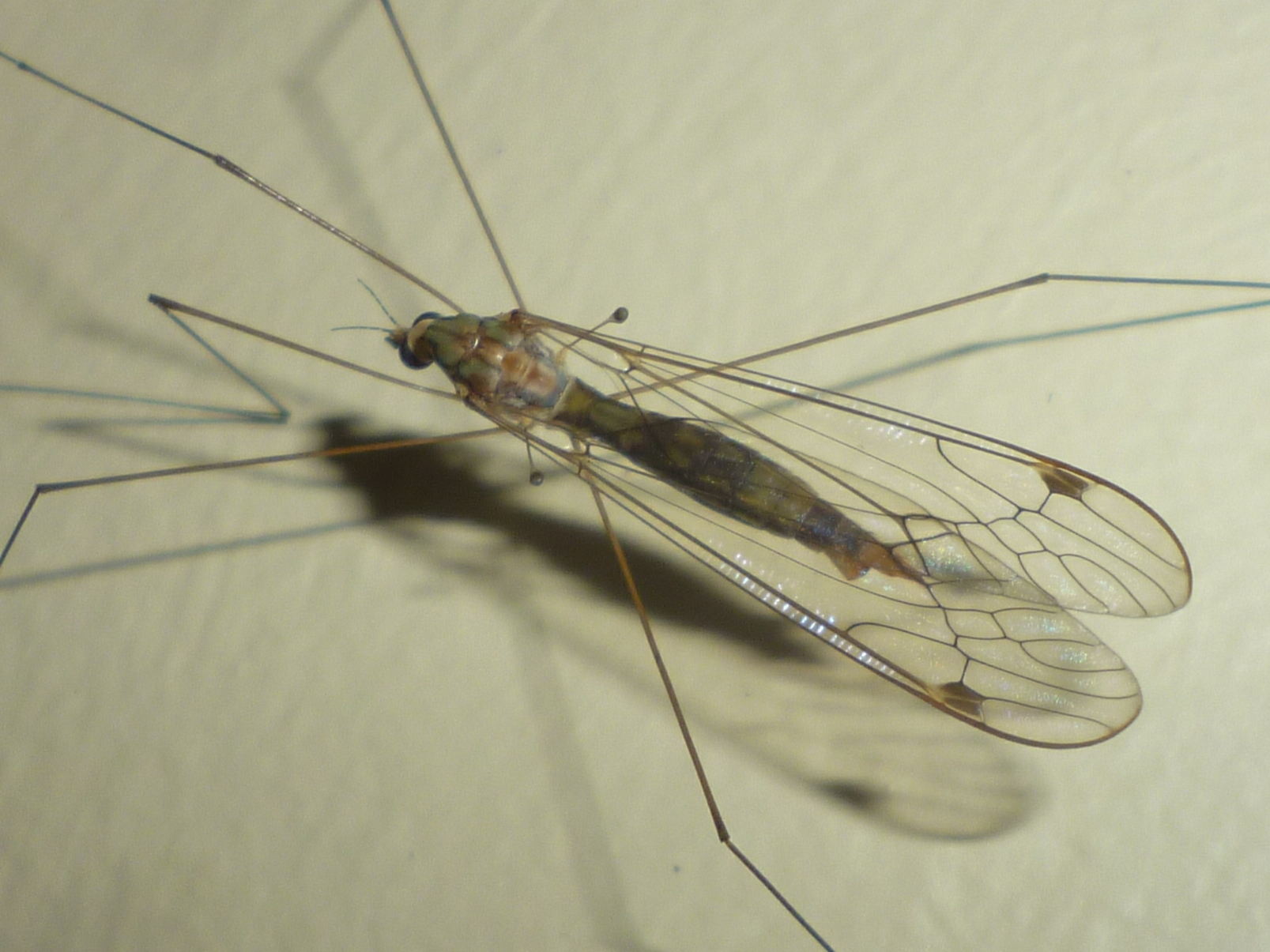

Scientific classification
- Kingdom: Animalia
- Phylum: Arthropoda
- Class: Insecta
- Order: Diptera
- Family: Tipulidae
- Genus: Megistocera
- Species: M. longipennis

Binomial name
- Megistocera longipennis (Marquart, 1838)

Synonyms
- Tipula longipennis Macquart, 1838

= Megistocera longipennis =

Species of fly

Megistocera longipennis is a species of large crane fly in the family Tipulidae.
