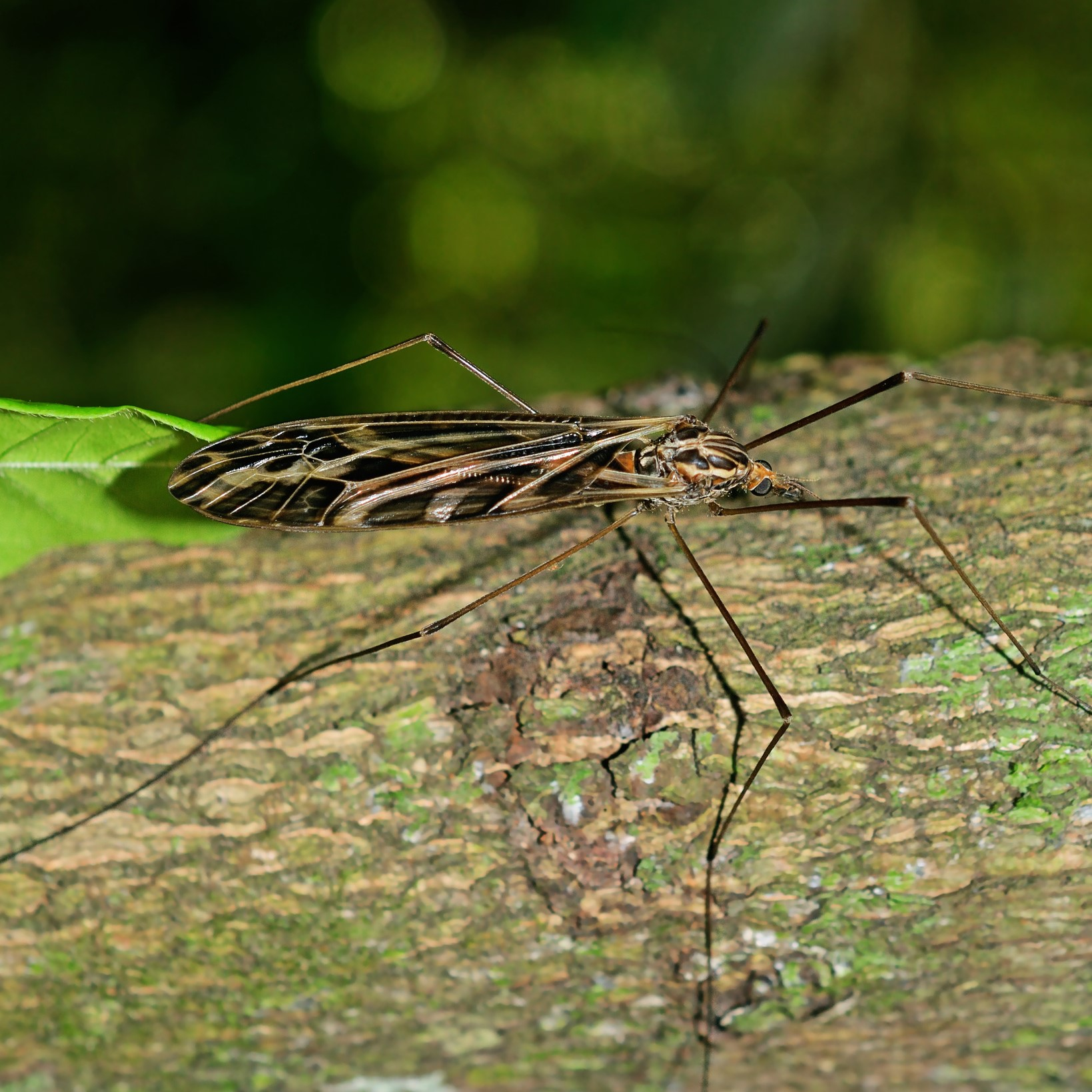
- Ischnotoma ocellata

Scientific classification
- Kingdom: Animalia
- Phylum: Arthropoda
- Clade: Pancrustacea
- Class: Insecta
- Order: Diptera
- Family: Tipulidae
- Subfamily: Tipulinae
- Genus: Ischnotoma; Skuse, 1890

Type species
- Tipula serricornis Macquart, 1838 [= eburnea (Walker, 1848)]

Subgenera
- Subgenus Icriomastax Enderlein, 1912; Subgenus Ischnotoma Skuse, 1890; Subgenus Neotipula Alexander, 1940

= Ischnotoma =

Genus of flies

Ischnotoma is a genus of true crane flies.

== Species ==
- Subgenus Icriomastax Enderlein, 1912

- I. antinympha (Alexander, 1942)
- I. calliope (Alexander, 1945)
- I. euterpe (Alexander, 1945)
- I. helios (Alexander, 1949)
- I. jujuyensis (Alexander, 1920)
- I. nitra (Alexander, 1945)
- I. nudicornis (Macquart, 1838)
- I. ocellata (Enderlein, 1912)
- I. phaeton (Alexander, 1945)
- I. zikani (Alexander, 1936)

- Subgenus Ischnotoma Skuse, 1890

- I. concinna (Philippi, 1866)
- I. decorata (Philippi, 1866)
- I. delpontei (Alexander, 1929)
- I. eburnea (Walker, 1848)
- I. episema Alexander, 1924
- I. fagetorum (Alexander, 1929)
- I. fastidiosa (Skuse, 1890)
- I. frauenfeldi (Schiner, 1868)
- I. fuscobasalis Alexander, 1937
- I. fuscostigmosa (Alexander, 1929)
- I. goldfinchi Alexander, 1924
- I. homochroa (Alexander, 1926)
- I. immaculipennis Alexander, 1924
- I. larotypa (Alexander, 1929)
- I. par (Walker, 1856)
- I. penai (Alexander, 1952)
- I. peracuta Alexander, 1971
- I. porteri (Alexander, 1929)
- I. postnotalis (Alexander, 1929)
- I. prionoceroides Alexander, 1922
- I. problematica (Alexander, 1945)
- I. rubriventris (Macquart, 1846)
- I. rubroabdominalis Alexander, 1922
- I. rufistigmosa (Macquart, 1838)
- I. rufiventris (Macquart, 1846)
- I. schineriana (Alexander, 1928)
- I. scutellumnigrum Alexander, 1924
- I. shannoniana (Alexander, 1929)
- I. silvai (Alexander, 1929)
- I. skuseana Alexander, 1928
- I. tarwinensis Alexander, 1928
- I. terminata Alexander, 1928
- I. vittigera (Philippi, 1866)

- Subgenus Neotipula Alexander, 1940

- I. maya (Alexander, 1912)
- I. paprzyckii (Alexander, 1941)
- I. pectinella (Alexander, 1940)
- I. penata (Alexander, 1966)
