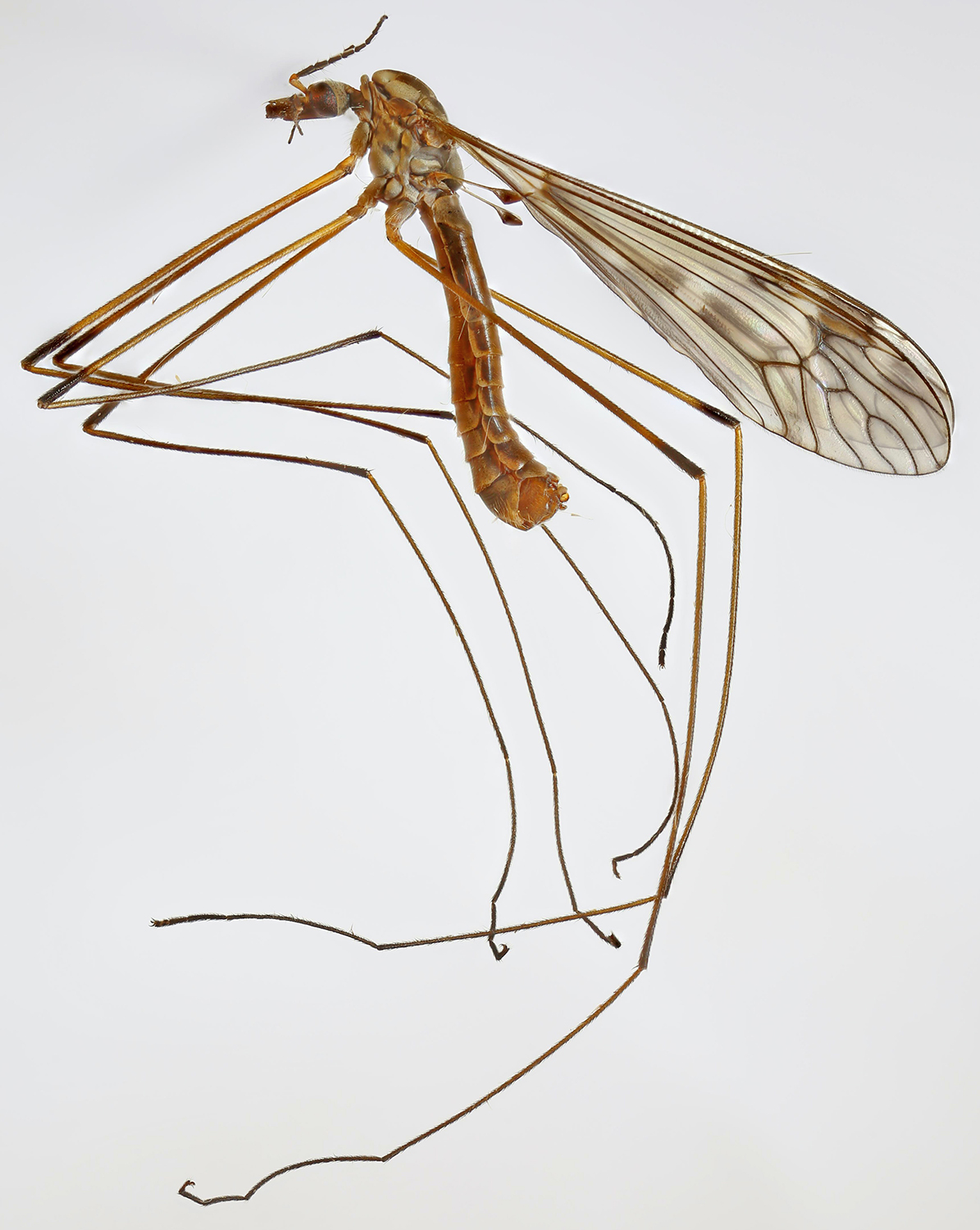
- Tipula confusa North Wales

Scientific classification
- Kingdom: Animalia
- Phylum: Arthropoda
- Clade: Pancrustacea
- Class: Insecta
- Order: Diptera
- Family: Tipulidae
- Genus: Tipula
- Subgenus: Savtshenkia
- Species: T. confusa

Binomial name
- Tipula confusa van der Wulp, 1883

= Tipula confusa =

Species of fly

Tipula confusa is a species of fly in the family Tipulidae. It is found in the Palearctic.
