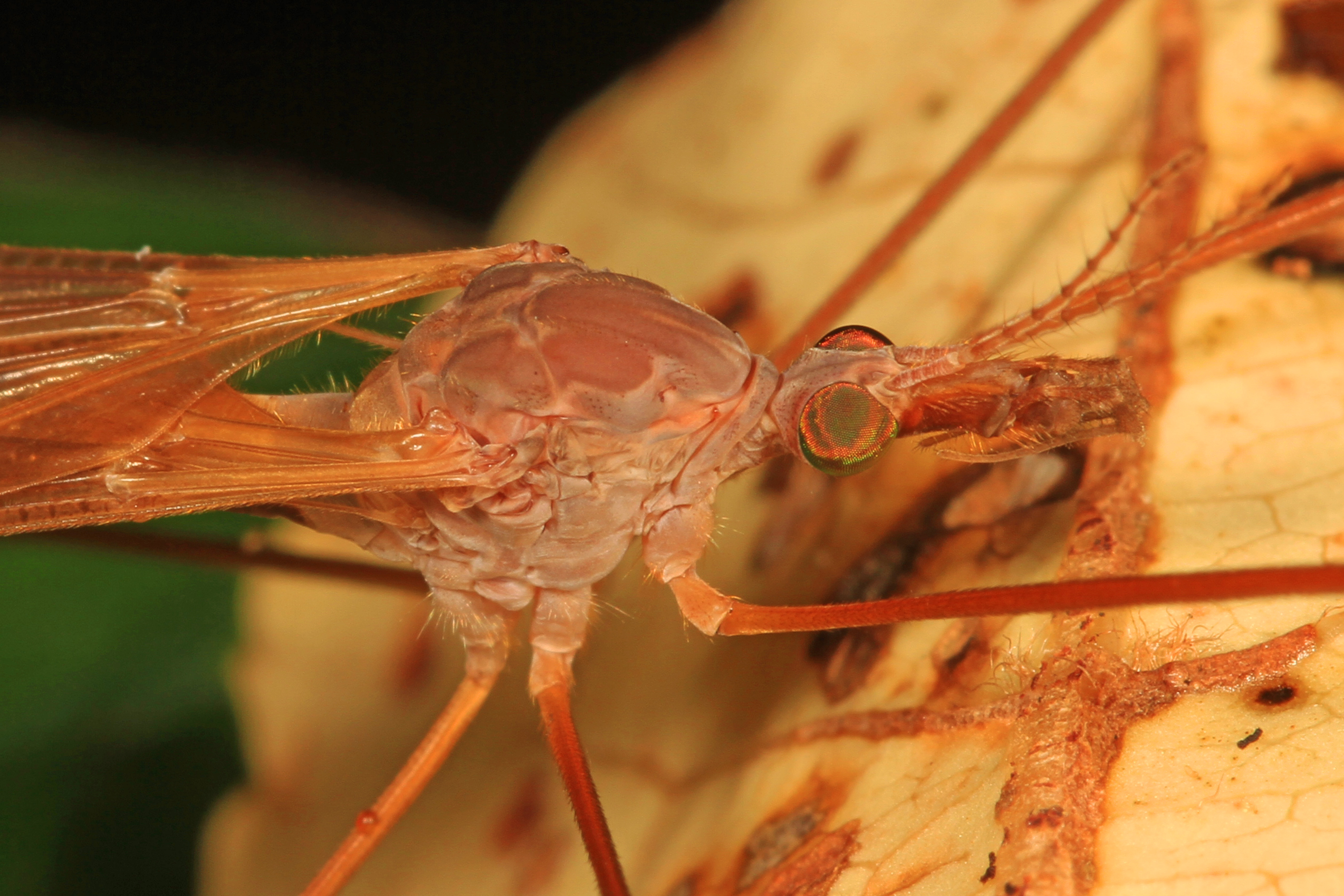

Scientific classification
- Kingdom: Animalia
- Phylum: Arthropoda
- Clade: Pancrustacea
- Class: Insecta
- Order: Diptera
- Family: Tipulidae
- Genus: Tipula
- Subgenus: Platytipula
- Species: T. ultima

Binomial name
- Tipula ultima Alexander, 1915

Synonyms
- Tipula flavescens Fabricius, 1805; Tipula flavicans Fabricius, 1805

= Tipula ultima =

Species of fly

Tipula ultima is a species of crane fly in the family Tipulidae, found in Canada and the United States. It was originally named Tipula flavescens by Fabricius in 1805. That name was preoccupied and Alexander proposed a new name ultima in 1915. Ultima is Latin for last; the species flies late in the year.
