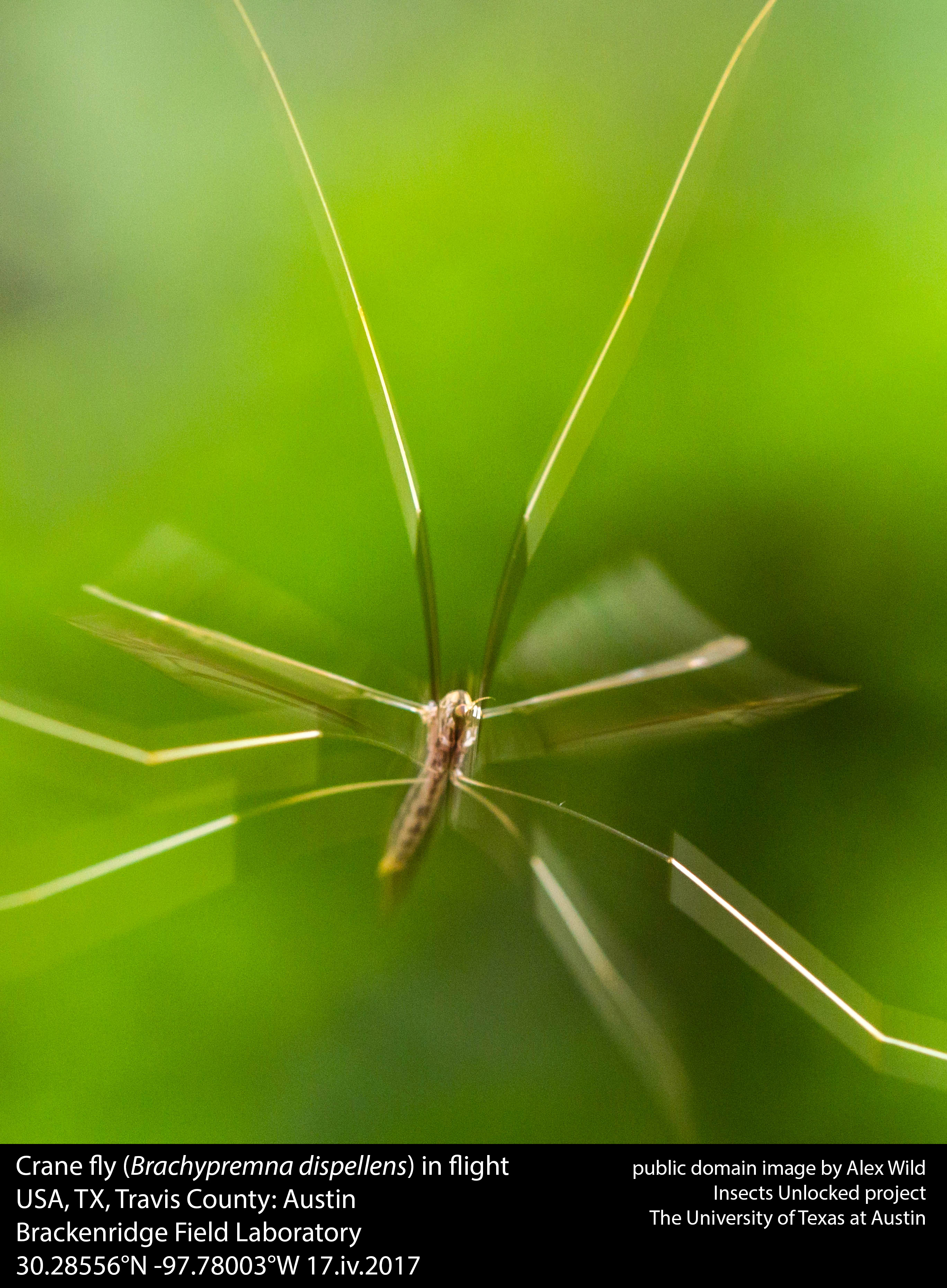

Scientific classification
- Kingdom: Animalia
- Phylum: Arthropoda
- Class: Insecta
- Order: Diptera
- Family: Tipulidae
- Genus: Brachypremna
- Species: B. dispellens

Binomial name
- Brachypremna dispellens Walker, 1861

= Brachypremna dispellens =

Species of fly

Brachypremna dispellens is a species of large crane fly in the family Tipulidae.
