= Acracantha =

Scientific classification
- Kingdom: Animalia
- Phylum: Arthropoda
- Clade: Pancrustacea
- Class: Insecta
- Order: Diptera
- Family: Tipulidae
- Subfamily: Tipulinae
- Genus: Acracantha; Skuse, 1890

Type species
- Acracantha sydneyensis Skuse, 1890

Species
- see text

Genus of flies

Acracantha is a genus of true crane fly.

== Distribution ==
Australia.

== Species ==
- A. inornata Skuse, 1890
- A. monticola Skuse, 1890
- A. sydneyensis Skuse, 1890
