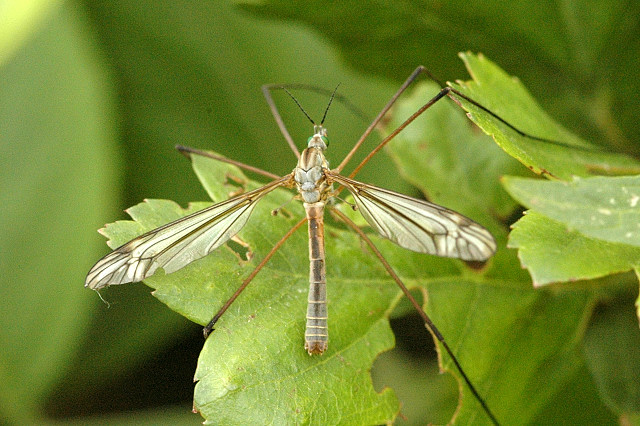
- Tipula luna male

Scientific classification
- Kingdom: Animalia
- Phylum: Arthropoda
- Clade: Pancrustacea
- Class: Insecta
- Order: Diptera
- Family: Tipulidae
- Subfamily: Tipulinae; Latreille, 1802

= Tipulinae =

Subfamily of flies

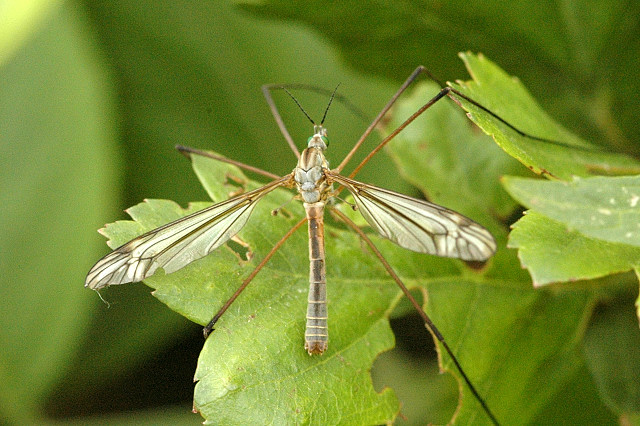
Tipulinae

Tipulinae is a subfamily of crane flies. It contains the typical crane flies from the genus Tipula.

== Genera ==
- Acracantha Skuse, 1890
- Angarotipula Savchenko, 1961
- Austrotipula Alexander, 1920
- Brachypremna Osten Sacken, 1887
- Brithura Edwards, 1916
- Clytocosmus Skuse, 1890
- Elnoretta Alexander, 1929
- Euvaldiviana Alexander, 1981
- Goniotipula Alexander, 1921
- Holorusia Loew, 1863
- Hovapeza Alexander, 1951
- Hovatipula Alexander, 1955
- Idiotipula Alexander, 1921
- Indotipula Edwards, 1931
- Ischnotoma Skuse, 1890
- Keiseromyia Alexander, 1963
- Leptotarsus Guerin-Meneville, 1831
- Macgregoromyia Alexander, 1929
- Megistocera Wiedemann, 1828
- Nephrotoma Meigen, 1803
- Nigrotipula Hudson & Vane-Wright, 1969
- Ozodicera Macquart, 1834
- Platyphasia Skuse, 1890
- Prionocera Loew, 1844
- Prionota van der Wulp, 1885
- Ptilogyna Westwood, 1835
- Scamboneura Osten Sacken, 1882
- Sphaerionotus de Meijere, 1919
- Tipula Linnaeus, 1758
- Tipulodina Enderlein, 1912
- Valdiviana Alexander, 1929
- Zelandotipula Alexander, 1922
