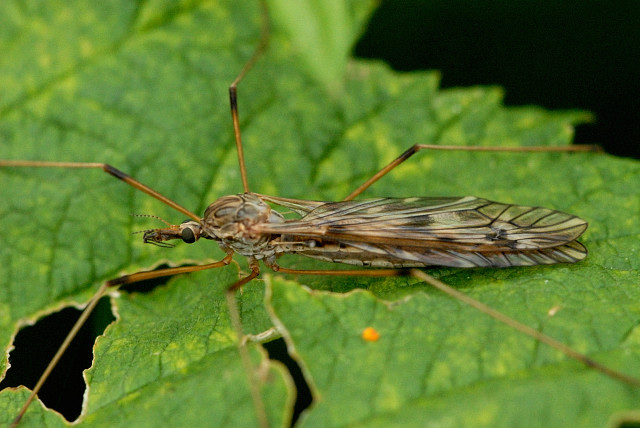
- Tipula scripta female

Scientific classification
- Kingdom: Animalia
- Phylum: Arthropoda
- Clade: Pancrustacea
- Class: Insecta
- Order: Diptera
- Family: Tipulidae
- Genus: Tipula
- Subgenus: Vestiplex
- Species: T. scripta

Binomial name
- Tipula scripta Meigen, 1830

= Tipula scripta =

Species of fly

Tipula scripta is a species of cranefly.

== Distribution ==
Palaearctic.

== Description ==
See

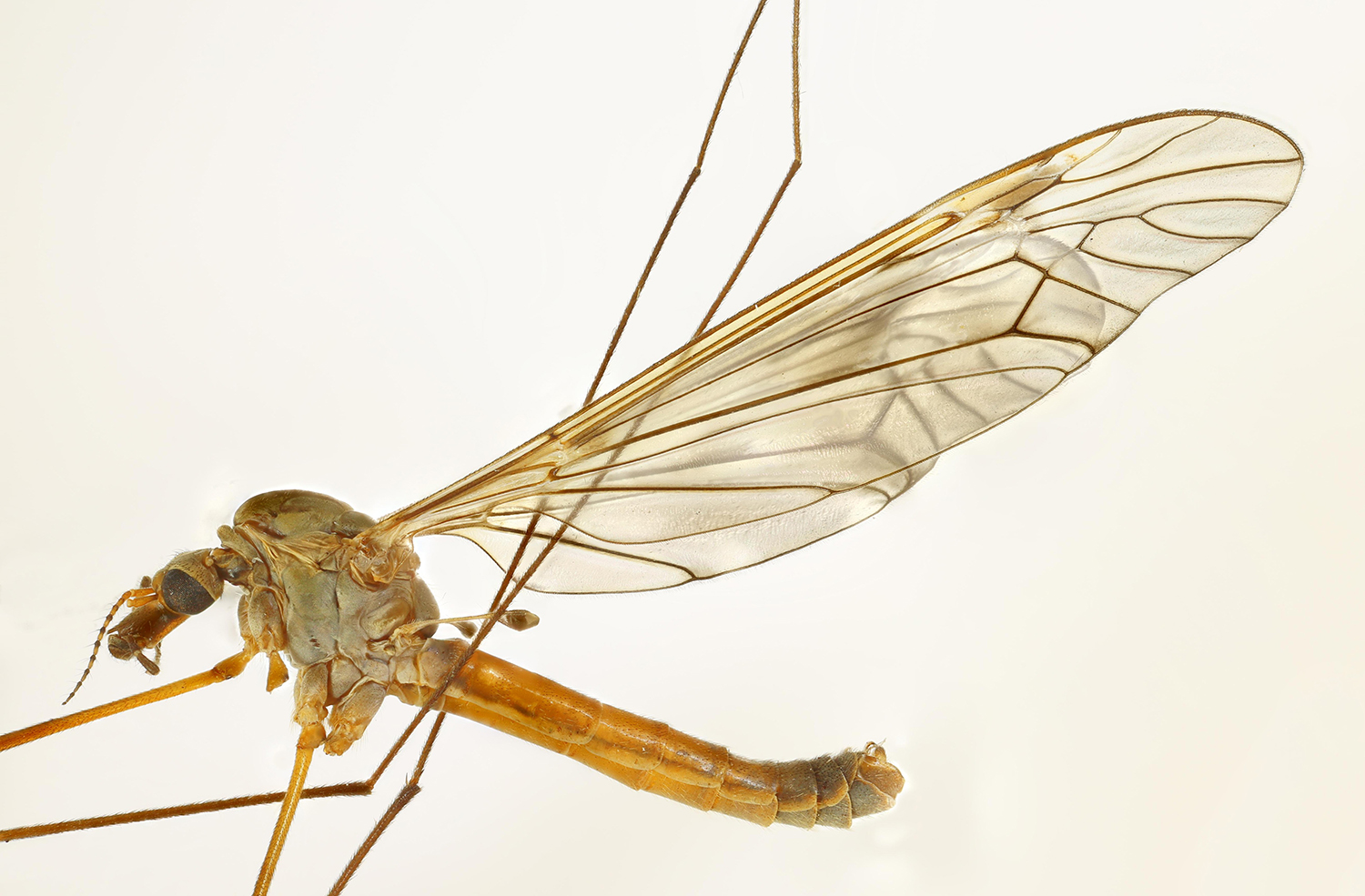
Tipula scripta male
