= Platyphasia =

Scientific classification
- Kingdom: Animalia
- Phylum: Arthropoda
- Clade: Pancrustacea
- Class: Insecta
- Order: Diptera
- Family: Tipulidae
- Subfamily: Tipulinae
- Genus: Platyphasia; Skuse, 1890

Type species
- Platyphasia princeps Skuse, 1890

Genus of flies

Platyphasia is a genus of crane flies from Australia, containing the following species:

- Platyphasia eximia Alexander, 1928
- Platyphasia pictonensis Dobrotworsky, 1971
- Platyphasia princeps Skuse, 1890
- Platyphasia rawlinsoni Dobrotworsky, 1971
- Platyphasia regina Alexander, 1922
- Platyphasia tasmaniensis Dobrotworsky, 1971
- Platyphasia wilsoni Alexander, 1929
