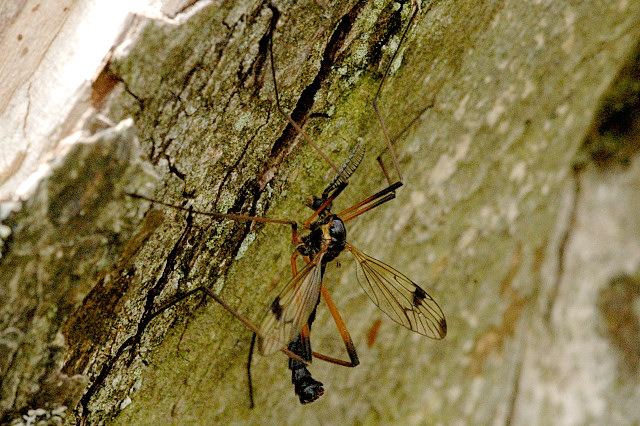
- Dictenidia bimaculata male

Scientific classification
- Kingdom: Animalia
- Phylum: Arthropoda
- Clade: Pancrustacea
- Class: Insecta
- Order: Diptera
- Family: Tipulidae
- Genus: Dictenidia
- Species: D. bimaculata

Binomial name
- Dictenidia bimaculata (Linnaeus, 1761)

Synonyms
- Tipula bimaculata Linnaeus, 1758; Tipula maculata

= Dictenidia bimaculata =

Species of fly

Dictenidia bimaculata is a species of crane fly which is widespread throughout the Palaearctic.

In the genus Ctenidia, the fourth and succeeding segments of the antennae bear a long basal process and a shorter subapical one. Female antennae have simple flagellar segments, and, apart from the first, are short and roundish, broader than long.

C. bimaculata Linnaeus is a shining, black species; the thorax is black, with more or less extensive orange markings. The abdomen is entirely black in the male, black with anterior orange markings to segments, spreading laterally, in the female; wings with two large dark brown spots, one extending down from stigmatic area to discal cell, the other, somewhat smaller, situated at apex; legs orange, femora and tibiae black-tipped, tarsi blackish. The wing length is 10–15 mm.

C. bimaculata is found in damp woods from April to July
