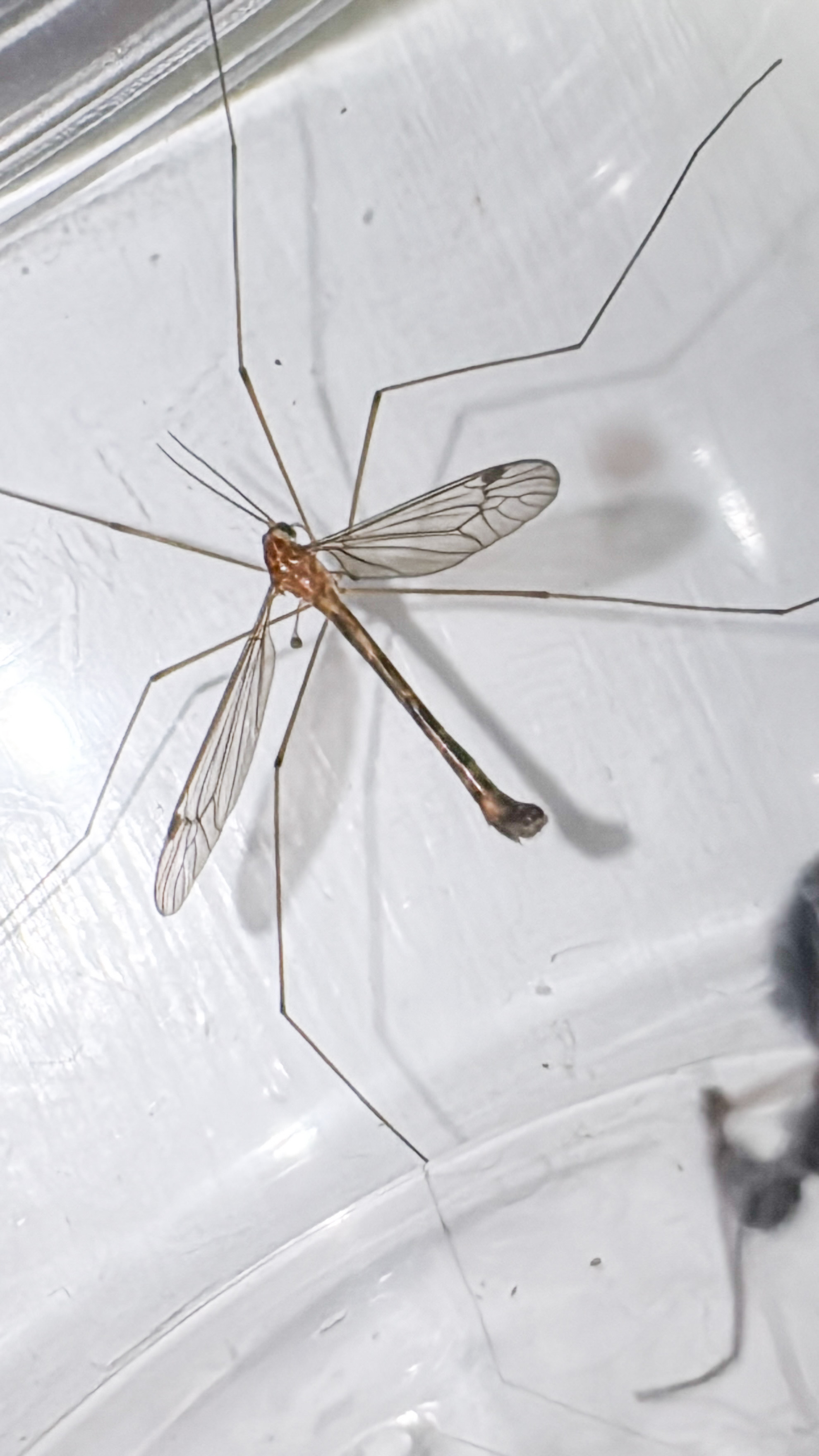
- Male specimen in Felton, CA

Scientific classification
- Kingdom: Animalia
- Phylum: Arthropoda
- Clade: Pancrustacea
- Class: Insecta
- Order: Diptera
- Family: Tipulidae
- Genus: Tipula
- Subgenus: Trichotipula
- Species: T. furialis

Binomial name
- Tipula furialis Alexander, 1946

= Tipula furialis =

Species of fly

Tipula furialis is a species of crane fly in the family Tipulidae, found in the western United States.

== Range ==
Tipula is currently only known to be in California.
