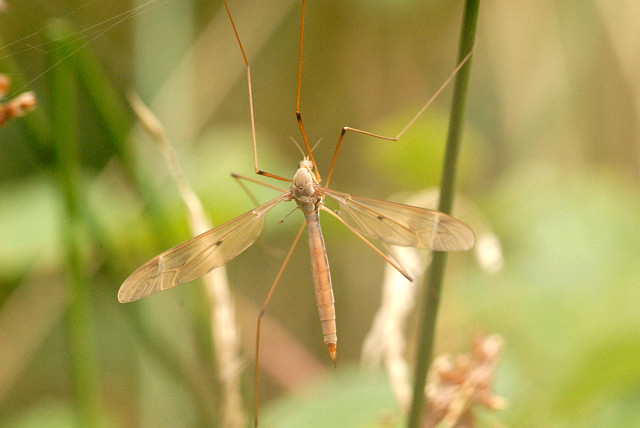
- Tipula fulvipennis female

Scientific classification
- Kingdom: Animalia
- Phylum: Arthropoda
- Clade: Pancrustacea
- Class: Insecta
- Order: Diptera
- Family: Tipulidae
- Genus: Tipula
- Subgenus: Acutipula
- Species: T. fulvipennis

Binomial name
- Tipula fulvipennis De Geer, 1776

Synonyms
- Tipula lutescens Fabricius, 1805

= Tipula fulvipennis =

Species of fly

Tipula fulvipennis is a species of true crane flies in the family Tipulidae.

== Distribution ==
Widespread throughout the Palaearctic. Although T. fulvipennis is described to be a "freely aquatic" organism, in addition to its favorable marsh soil environment, it can be occasionally found in shallow streams.
