= Clytocosmus =

Scientific classification
- Kingdom: Animalia
- Phylum: Arthropoda
- Clade: Pancrustacea
- Class: Insecta
- Order: Diptera
- Family: Tipulidae
- Subfamily: Tipulinae
- Genus: Clytocosmus; Skuse, 1890

Type species
- Clytocosmus helmsi Skuse, 1890

Species
- see text

Genus of flies

Clytocosmus is a genus of true crane fly.

== Distribution ==
Australia.

== Species ==
- C. alexanderi Dobrotworsky, 1968
- C. edwardsi Alexander, 1922
- C. helmsi Skuse, 1890
- C. lichtwardti Riedel, 1920
- C. nichollsi Paramonov, 1953
- C. tillyardi Alexander, 1920
