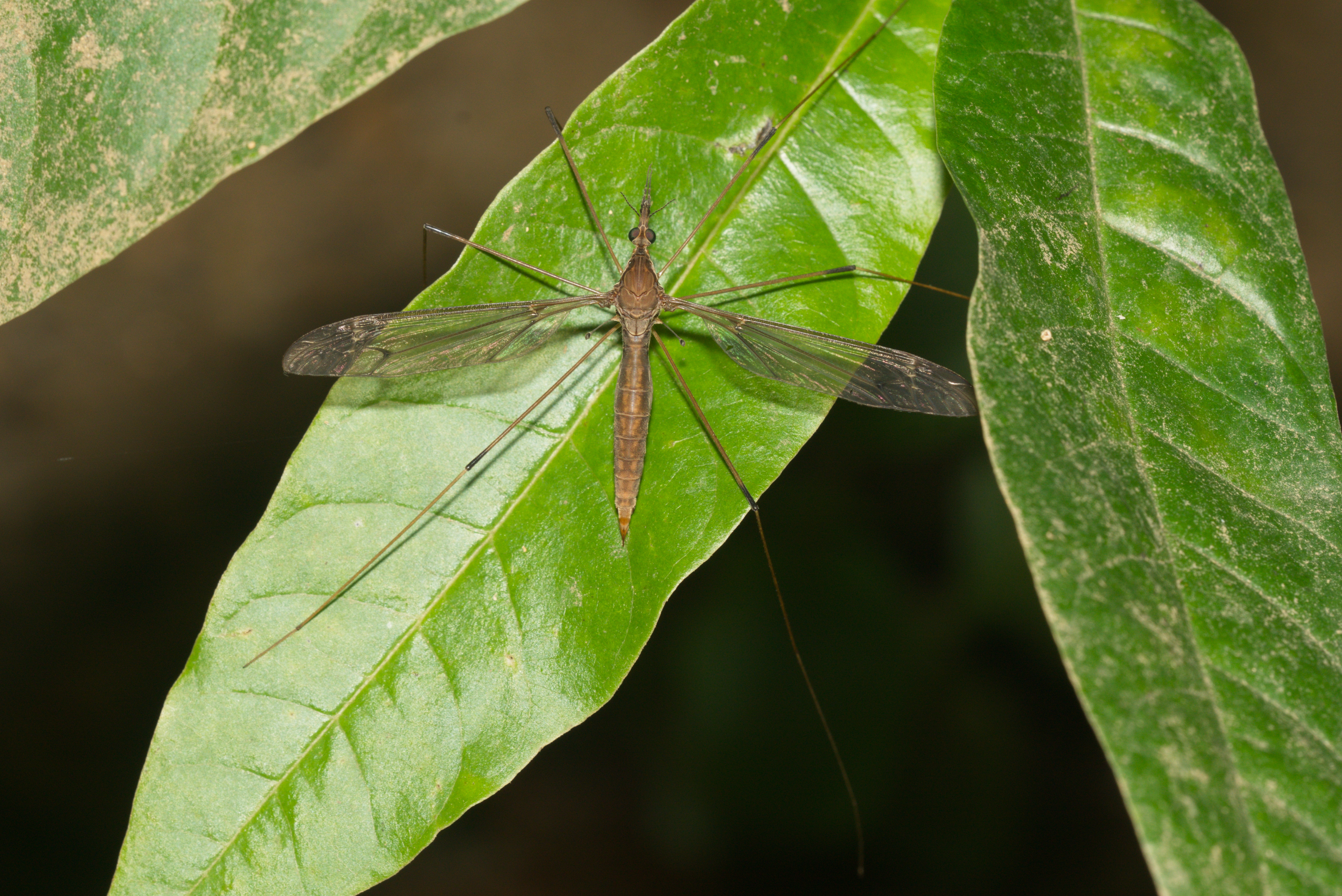
- Holorusia sp. female

Scientific classification
- Kingdom: Animalia
- Phylum: Arthropoda
- Class: Insecta
- Order: Diptera
- Family: Tipulidae
- Subfamily: Tipulinae
- Genus: Holorusia; Loew, 1863

Type species
- Holorusia rubiginosa Loew, 1863 [= hespera Arnaud & Byers, 1990]

Species
- see text

= Holorusia =

Genus of flies

Holorusia is a genus of true crane fly, including the largest known crane fly species, Holorusia mikado.

== Biology ==
The larvae are aquatic.

== Distribution ==
Asia & Australasia.

== Species ==
- H. aberrans (Alexander, 1920)
- H. agni Alexander, 1971
- H. albicostigma (Alexander, 1950)
- H. albovittata (Macquart, 1838)
- H. andrewsi (Edwards, 1932)
- H. astarte (Alexander, 1949)
- H. basiflava Yang & Yang, 1993
- H. bioculata (Alexander, 1967)
- H. bitruncata (Alexander, 1950)
- H. borneensis (Brunetti, 1918)
- H. bourbonica (Alexander, 1957)
- H. brobdignagia (Westwood, 1876)
- H. calliergon (Alexander, 1940)
- H. carmichaeli (Brunetti, 1913)
- H. castanea (Macquart, 1838)
- H. cerbereana (Alexander, 1942)
- H. clavipes (Edwards, 1921)
- H. conspicabilis Skuse, 1890
- H. cressida (Alexander, 1953)
- H. damuda Evenhuis, 2006
- H. degeneri Alexander, 1978
- H. dives (Brunetti, 1912)
- H. dohrniana (Enderlein, 1912)
- H. dorsopleuralis (Alexander, 1957)
- H. dravidica (Edwards, 1932)
- H. elobata (Alexander, 1967)
- H. esakii (Takahashi, 1960)
- H. festivipennis (Edwards, 1933)
- H. fijiensis (Alexander, 1921)
- H. flava (Brunetti, 1911)
- H. flavoides (Brunetti, 1918)
- H. fulvipes (Edwards, 1921)
- H. fulvolateralis (Brunetti, 1911)
- H. glebosa Alexander, 1971
- H. globulicornis (Alexander, 1935)
- H. goliath (Alexander, 1941)
- H. hainanensis Yang & Yang, 1997
- H. hansoni (Alexander, 1963)
- H. henana Yang, 1999
- H. herculeana (Alexander, 1941)
- H. hespera Arnaud & Byers, 1990
- H. ignicaudata (Alexander, 1935)
- H. illex (Alexander, 1947)
- H. impictipleura (Alexander, 1957)
- H. inclyta (Alexander, 1949)
- H. incurvata Yang & Yang, 1993
- H. inventa (Walker, 1848)
- H. japvoensis (Alexander, 1953)
- H. lacunosa Alexander, 1971
- H. laticellula (Alexander, 1949)
- H. lepida (Alexander, 1924)
- H. leptostylus (Alexander, 1963)
- H. liberta (Alexander, 1935)
- H. lieftincki (Edwards, 1932)
- H. lineaticeps (Edwards, 1932)
- H. lombokensis (Alexander, 1942)
- H. luteistigmata (Alexander, 1963)
- H. majestica (Brunetti, 1911)
- H. makara (Alexander, 1967)
- H. malayensis (Edwards, 1932)
- H. mamare Evenhuis, 2006
- H. mara (Alexander, 1953)
- H. mikado (Westwood, 1876)
- H. mitra Alexander, 1969
- H. molybros (Alexander, 1957)
- H. monochroa (Wiedemann, 1828)
- H. nagana (Alexander, 1953)
- H. nampoina (Alexander, 1963)
- H. nigricauda (Edwards, 1925)
- H. nigrofemorata (Alexander, 1967)
- H. nimba (Alexander, 1936)
- H. nirvana (Alexander, 1961)
- H. novaeguineae (de Meijere, 1913)
- H. nudicaudata (Edwards, 1932)
- H. ochripes (Brunetti, 1911)
- H. oosterbroeki Yang & Yang, 1997
- H. ornatithorax (Brunetti, 1911)
- H. palauensis (Alexander, 1940)
- H. pallescens (Edwards, 1926)
- H. pallifrons (Edwards, 1932)
- H. pauliani (Alexander, 1955)
- H. penumbrina (Edwards, 1919)
- H. percontracta (Alexander, 1947)
- H. perobtusa (Alexander, 1961)
- H. persessilis (Alexander, 1941)
- H. picturata Evenhuis, 2006
- H. pluto (Brunetti, 1911)
- H. praepotens (Wiedemann, 1828)
- H. punctifrons (Rondani, 1875)
- H. punctipennis (Edwards, 1926)
- H. quadrifasciculata (Alexander, 1935)
- H. quathlambica (Alexander, 1956)
- H. radama (Alexander, 1963)
- H. rector (Edwards, 1926)
- H. regia (Alexander, 1935)
- H. rex (Alexander, 1917)
- H. rogeziana (Alexander, 1955)
- H. sakarahana (Alexander, 1960)
- H. schlingeri Evenhuis, 2006
- H. similis (Edwards, 1921)
- H. simplicitarsis (Alexander, 1963)
- H. siva (Alexander, 1950)
- H. sordidithorax (Alexander, 1953)
- H. striaticeps (Alexander, 1957)
- H. sufflava (Alexander, 1957)
- H. umbrina (Wiedemann, 1828)
- H. vanewrighti Alexander, 1971
- H. viettei (Alexander, 1957)
- H. vinsoniana (Alexander, 1956)
- H. vishnu Alexander, 1971
- H. walkeriana (Alexander, 1924)
- H. yama Alexander, 1969
