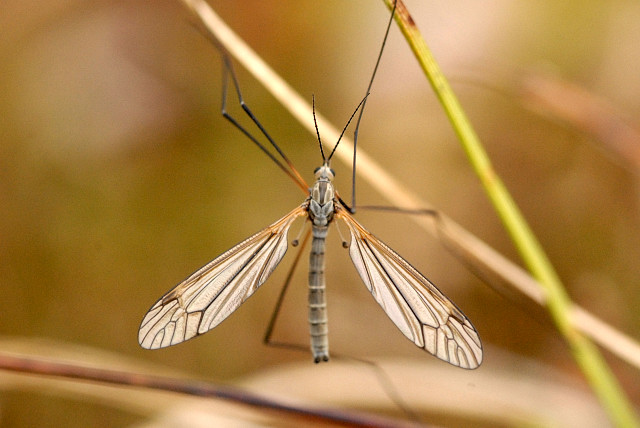
- Tipula pruinosa male

Scientific classification
- Kingdom: Animalia
- Phylum: Arthropoda
- Clade: Pancrustacea
- Class: Insecta
- Order: Diptera
- Family: Tipulidae
- Genus: Tipula
- Subgenus: Yamatotipula
- Species: T. pruinosa

Binomial name
- Tipula pruinosa Wiedemann, 1817

Subspecies
- Tipula pruinosa sinapruinosa Yang & Yang, 1993; Tipula pruinosa stackelbergi Alexander, 1934

= Tipula pruinosa =

Species of fly

Tipula pruinosa is a species of true craneflies.

== Distribution ==
Widespread throughout the Palaearctic. For identification see

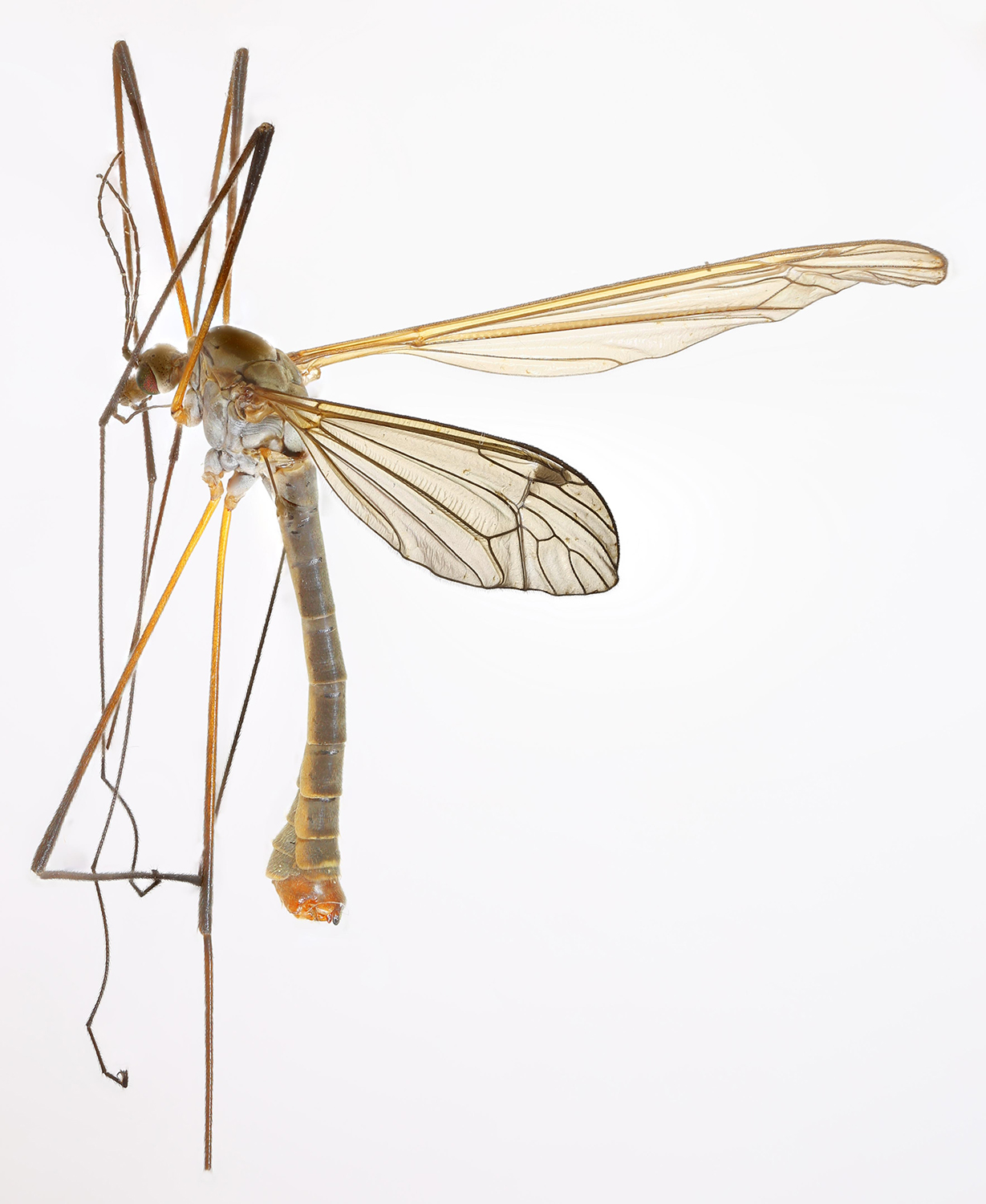
Tipula pruinosa specimen.North Wales.
