= Ptilogyna =

Scientific classification
- Kingdom: Animalia
- Phylum: Arthropoda
- Class: Insecta
- Order: Diptera
- Family: Tipulidae
- Subfamily: Tipulinae
- Genus: Ptilogyna; Westwood, 1835

Type species
- Tipula ramicornis Walker, 1835

Subgenera
- Ctenogyna Macquart, 1838; Plusiomyia Skuse, 1890; Ptilogyna Westwood, 1835

Genus of flies

Ptilogyna is a genus of true crane fly.

== Distribution ==
Australia, Brazil, New Caledonia & Papua New Guinea.

== Species ==
- Subgenus Ctenogyna Macquart, 1838

- P. bicolor (Macquart, 1838)
- P. nasalis (Alexander, 1924)

- Subgenus Plusiomyia Skuse, 1890

- P. clarki (Alexander, 1928)
- P. felix (Alexander, 1922)
- P. flabellifera Loew, 1851
- P. gracilis (Walker, 1848)
- P. herroni (Alexander, 1948)
- P. inornata (Skuse, 1890)
- P. kraussiana (Alexander, 1966)
- P. leucoplagia (Alexander, 1957)
- P. lineata (Skuse, 1890)
- P. mackerrasi (Alexander, 1928)
- P. margaritae (Alexander, 1948)
- P. mathesonae Dobrotworsky, 1971
- P. minor (Alexander, 1922)
- P. necopina (Alexander, 1922)
- P. neocaledonica (Alexander, 1948)
- P. neogama (Alexander, 1944)
- P. olliffi (Skuse, 1890)
- P. pandoxa (Alexander, 1922)
- P. spissigrada (Alexander, 1922)
- P. tasmaniensis (Alexander, 1922)
- P. tripectinata (Alexander, 1922)
- P. wellsi (Alexander, 1950)
- P. westralis Dobrotworsky, 1971

- Subgenus Ptilogyna Westwood, 1835

- P. cheesmanae Alexander, 1947
- P. macquartii Loew, 1851
- P. minima Alexander, 1922
- P. ramicornis (Walker, 1835)
