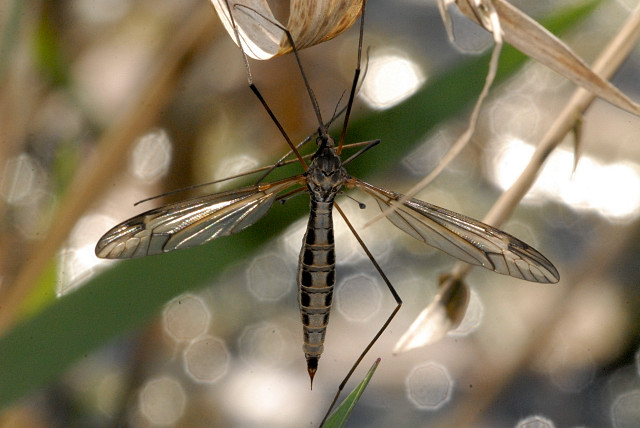
- Tipula lateralis female

Scientific classification
- Kingdom: Animalia
- Phylum: Arthropoda
- Clade: Pancrustacea
- Class: Insecta
- Order: Diptera
- Family: Tipulidae
- Genus: Tipula
- Subgenus: Yamatotipula
- Species: T. lateralis

Binomial name
- Tipula lateralis Meigen, 1830

Synonyms
- Tipula intermedia Eiroa, 1990

= Tipula lateralis =

Species of fly

Tipula lateralis is a species of true craneflies.

== Distribution ==
Widespread throughout the Palaearctic. Flies from March to September.

== Identification ==
See

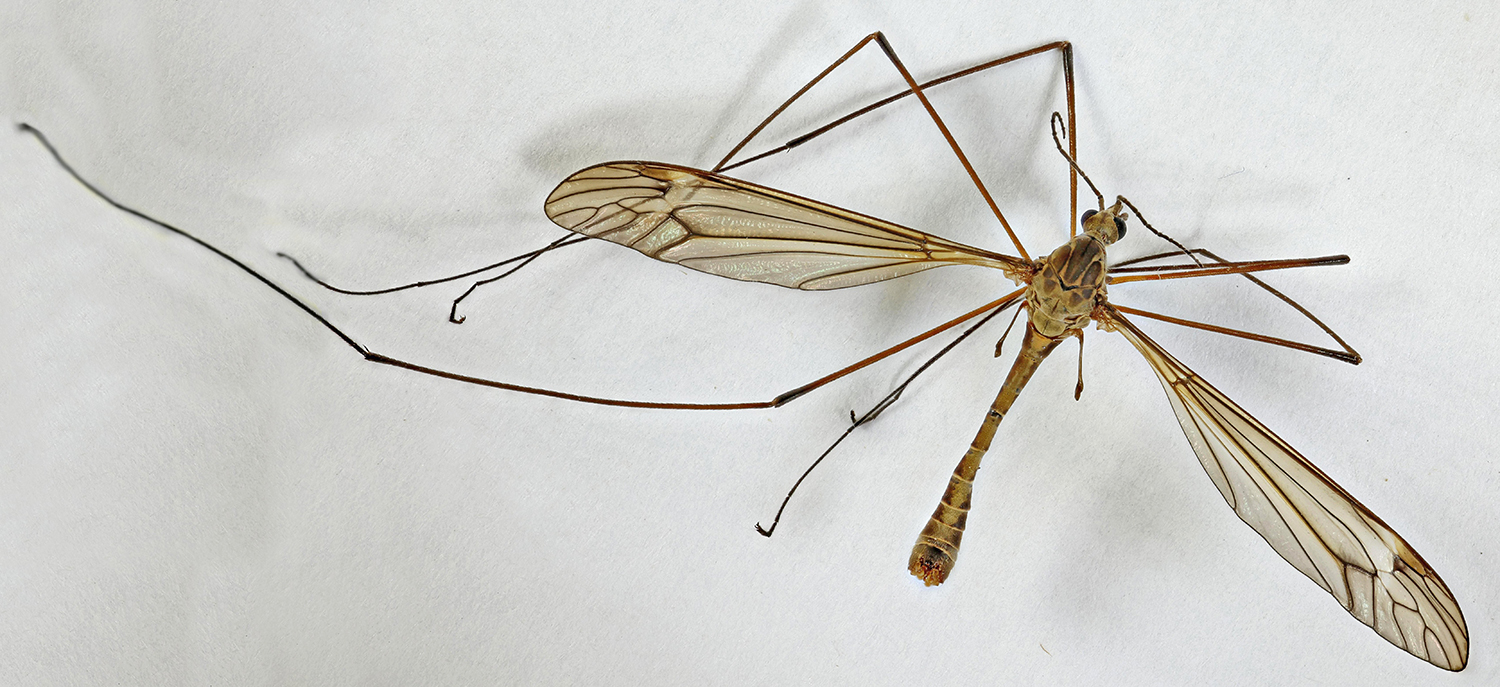
Tipula lateralis specimen North Wales
