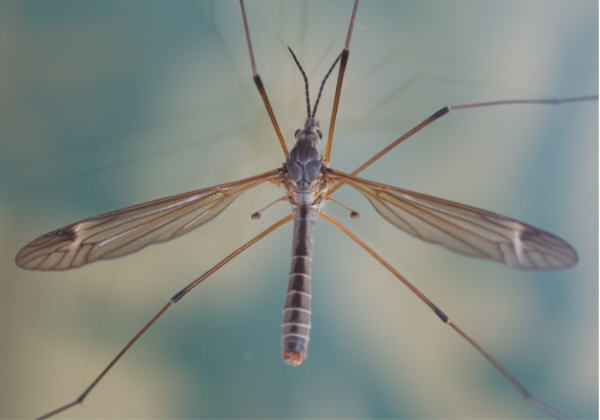
- Prionocera turcica Netherlands

Scientific classification
- Kingdom: Animalia
- Phylum: Arthropoda
- Class: Insecta
- Order: Diptera
- Family: Tipulidae
- Genus: Prionocera
- Species: P. turcica

Binomial name
- Prionocera turcica (Fabricius, 1787)

= Prionocera turcica =

Species of fly

Prionocera turcica is a species of fly in the family Tipulidae. It is found in the Palearctic.
