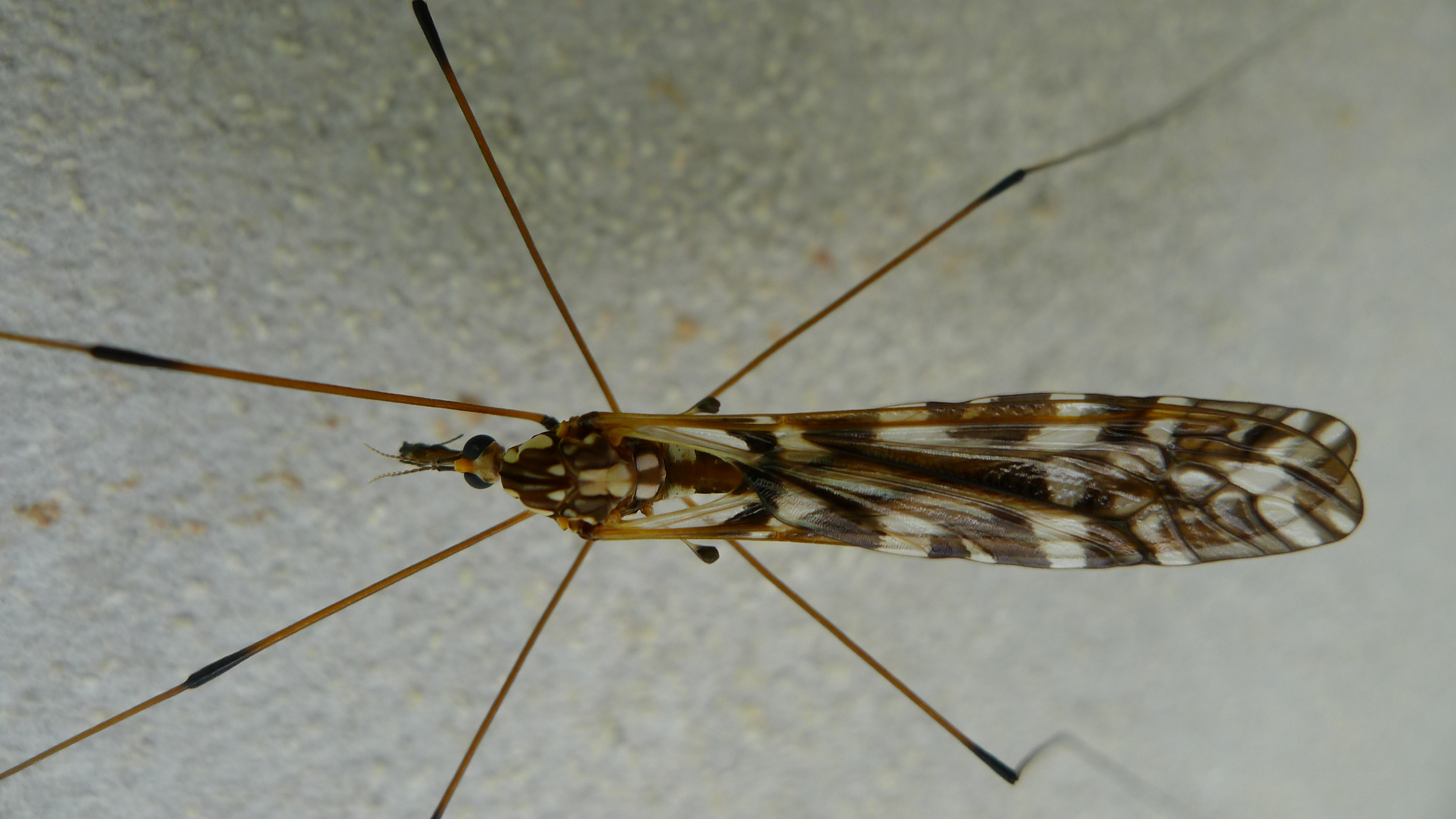

Scientific classification
- Kingdom: Animalia
- Phylum: Arthropoda
- Clade: Pancrustacea
- Class: Insecta
- Order: Diptera
- Family: Tipulidae
- Genus: Ischnotoma
- Species: I. eburnea

Binomial name
- Ischnotoma eburnea Walker 1848

= Ischnotoma eburnea =

Species of fly

Ischnotoma eburnea is a species of cranefly, found in Australia.
