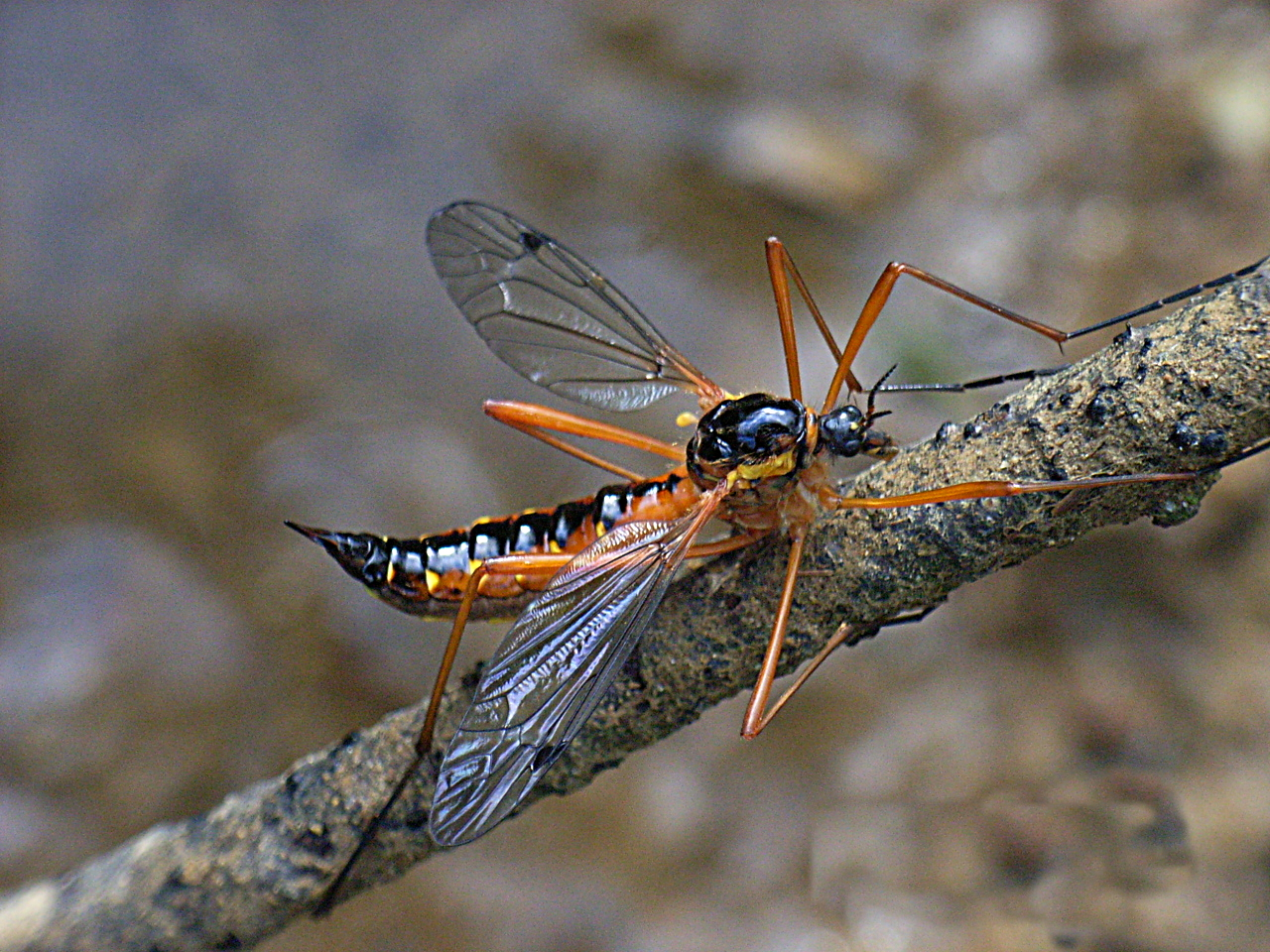
- Ctenophora pectinicornis female

Scientific classification
- Kingdom: Animalia
- Phylum: Arthropoda
- Clade: Pancrustacea
- Class: Insecta
- Order: Diptera
- Family: Tipulidae
- Subfamily: Ctenophorinae; Kertézs, 1902

Genera
- See text

= Ctenophorinae =

Subfamily of flies

The Ctenophorinae are a subfamily of Tipulidae, the true crane flies. Most species are large, colourful crane flies.

== Genera ==
- Ctenophora Meigen, 1803
- Dictenidia Brulle, 1833
- Phoroctenia Coquillett, 1910
- Pselliophora Osten Sacken, 1887
- Tanyptera Latreille, 1804
