= Euvaldiviana =

Scientific classification
- Kingdom: Animalia
- Phylum: Arthropoda
- Class: Insecta
- Order: Diptera
- Family: Tipulidae
- Subfamily: Tipulinae
- Genus: Euvaldiviana; Alexander, 1981

Type species
- Euvaldiviana penaina Alexander, 1981

Species
- see text

Genus of flies

Euvaldiviana is a genus of true crane fly.

== Distribution ==
Chile.

== Species ==
- E. penaina Alexander, 1981
