= Hovapeza =

Scientific classification
- Kingdom: Animalia
- Phylum: Arthropoda
- Class: Insecta
- Order: Diptera
- Family: Tipulidae
- Subfamily: Tipulinae
- Genus: Hovapeza; Alexander, 1951

Type species
- Dolichopeza tisiphone Alexander, 1951

Species
- see text

Genus of flies

Hovapeza is a genus of true crane fly.

== Distribution ==
Madagascar

== Species ==
- H. costofuscata Alexander, 1958
- H. tisiphone (Alexander, 1951)
