= Hovatipula =

Scientific classification
- Kingdom: Animalia
- Phylum: Arthropoda
- Class: Insecta
- Order: Diptera
- Family: Tipulidae
- Subfamily: Tipulinae
- Genus: Hovatipula; Alexander, 1955

Type species
- Longurio megalothorax Alexander, 1955

Species
- see text

Genus of flies

Hovatipula is a genus of true crane fly.

== Distribution ==
Madagascar

== Species ==
- H. cubitalbella Alexander, 1963
- H. kallion Alexander, 1960
- H. megalothorax (Alexander, 1955)
- H. pheletes Alexander, 1960
