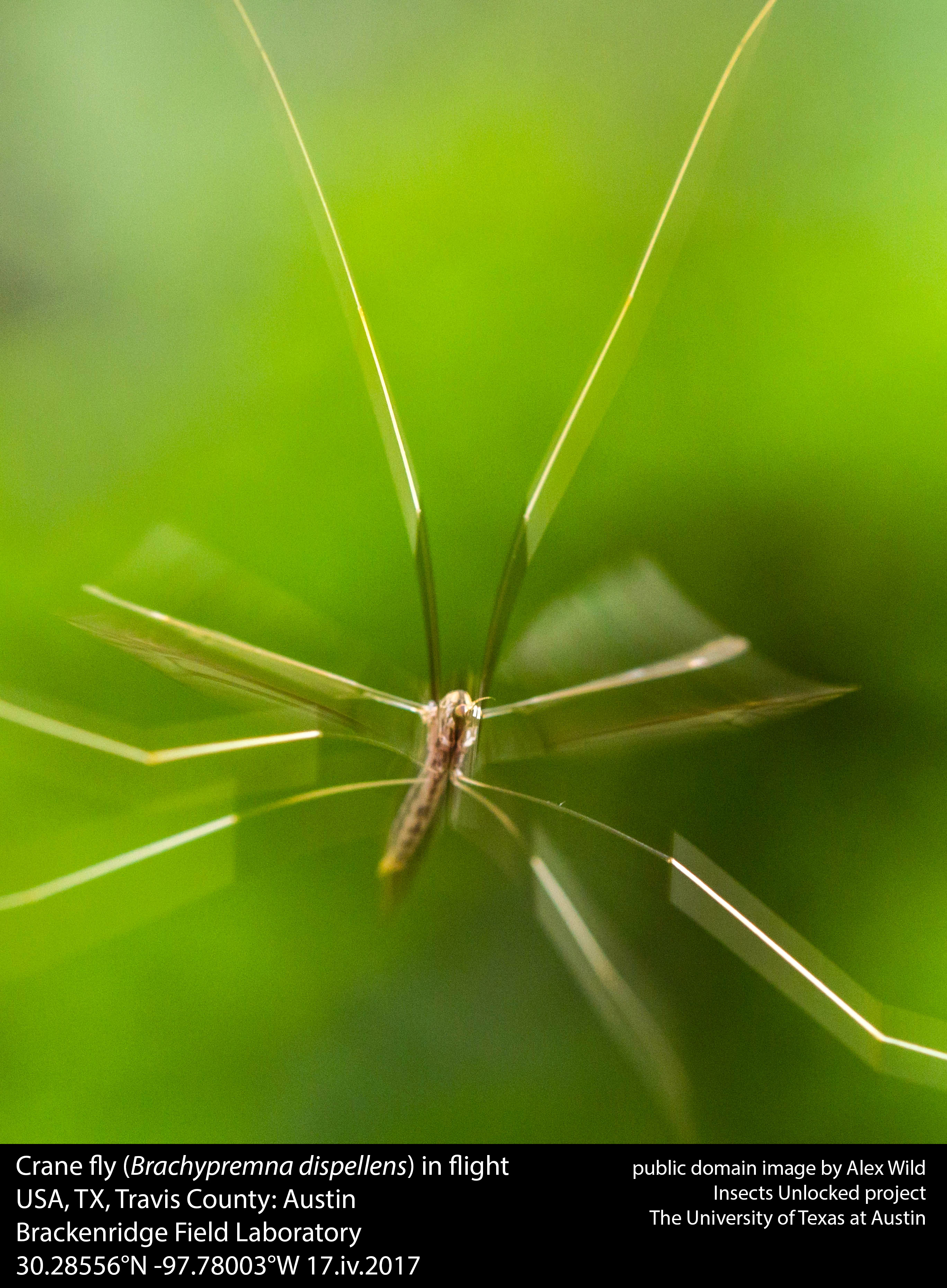
- Brachypremna dispellens

Scientific classification
- Kingdom: Animalia
- Phylum: Arthropoda
- Class: Insecta
- Order: Diptera
- Family: Tipulidae
- Subfamily: Tipulinae
- Genus: Brachypremna; Osten Sacken, 1887

Type species
- Tipula dispellens Walker, 1861

Species
- see text

= Brachypremna =

Genus of flies

Brachypremna is a genus of true crane fly.

== Distribution ==
Most members of this genus are found in Central and South America, with one found in North America and two in Oceania.

== Species ==
As of December 2025, this genus contains the following species:

- B. abitaguae Alexander, 1946 - Ecuador
- B. angusta Alexander, 1945 - Brazil
- B. appendigera Alexander, 1946 - Ecuador, Peru
- B. arajuno Alexander, 1945 - Ecuador
- B. arcuaria Alexander, 1937 - Ecuador, Venezuela
- B. australis Alexander, 1923 - Argentina
- B. basilica Alexander, 1921 - Peru
- B. brevigenua Alexander, 1945 - Brazil
- B. breviterebra Alexander, 1944 - Brazil
- B. breviventris (Wiedemann, 1821) - Bolivia, Brazil, Guyana, Peru, Suriname, Venezuela
- B. candida Alexander, 1912 - Panama, Brazil, Ecuador, Guyana, Peru, Suriname
- B. candidella Alexander, 1969 - Ecuador, Peru
- B. clymene Alexander, 1945 - Brazil
- B. dispellens (Walker, 1861) - USA to Brazil
- B. diversipes Alexander, 1941 - Peru
- B. geijskesi Alexander, 1945 - Suriname
- B. illudens Alexander, 1946 - Peru
- B. integristigma Alexander, 1940 - Brazil
- B. itatiayana Alexander, 1944 - Brazil
- B. karma Alexander, 1945 - Ecuador
- B. laetiventris Alexander, 1945 - Venezuela
- B. nigrofemorata Alexander, 1937 - Brazil
- B. phrixus Alexander, 1953 - Ecuador
- B. pictipes Osten Sacken, 1888 - Ecuador
- B. pictiventris Alexander, 1945 - Brazil
- B. quasimodo Alexander, 1943 - Ecuador
- B. sappho Alexander, 1943 - Brazil
- B. similis Williston, 1900 - Costa Rica, Guatemala, Mexico, Nicaragua, Panama; Venezuela
- B. subevanescens Alexander, 1962 - Bolivia
- B. subsimilis Alexander, 1921 - Argentina, Brazil
- B. subuniformis Alexander, 1945 - Venezuela
- B. thyestes Alexander, 1954 - Peru
- B. tigriventris Alexander, 1922 - Australia (Queensland)
- B. unicolor Osten Sacken, 1888 - Cuba, Dominican Republic, Grenada, Haiti, Jamaica, Puerto Rico
- B. uniformis Alexander, 1920 - Brazil, Peru
- B. variitibia Alexander, 1937 - Brazil
- B. waigeuensis Alexander, 1948 - Indonesia (Papua)
- B. williamsoni Alexander, 1912 - Guyana, Brazil, Panama, Peru, Suriname
