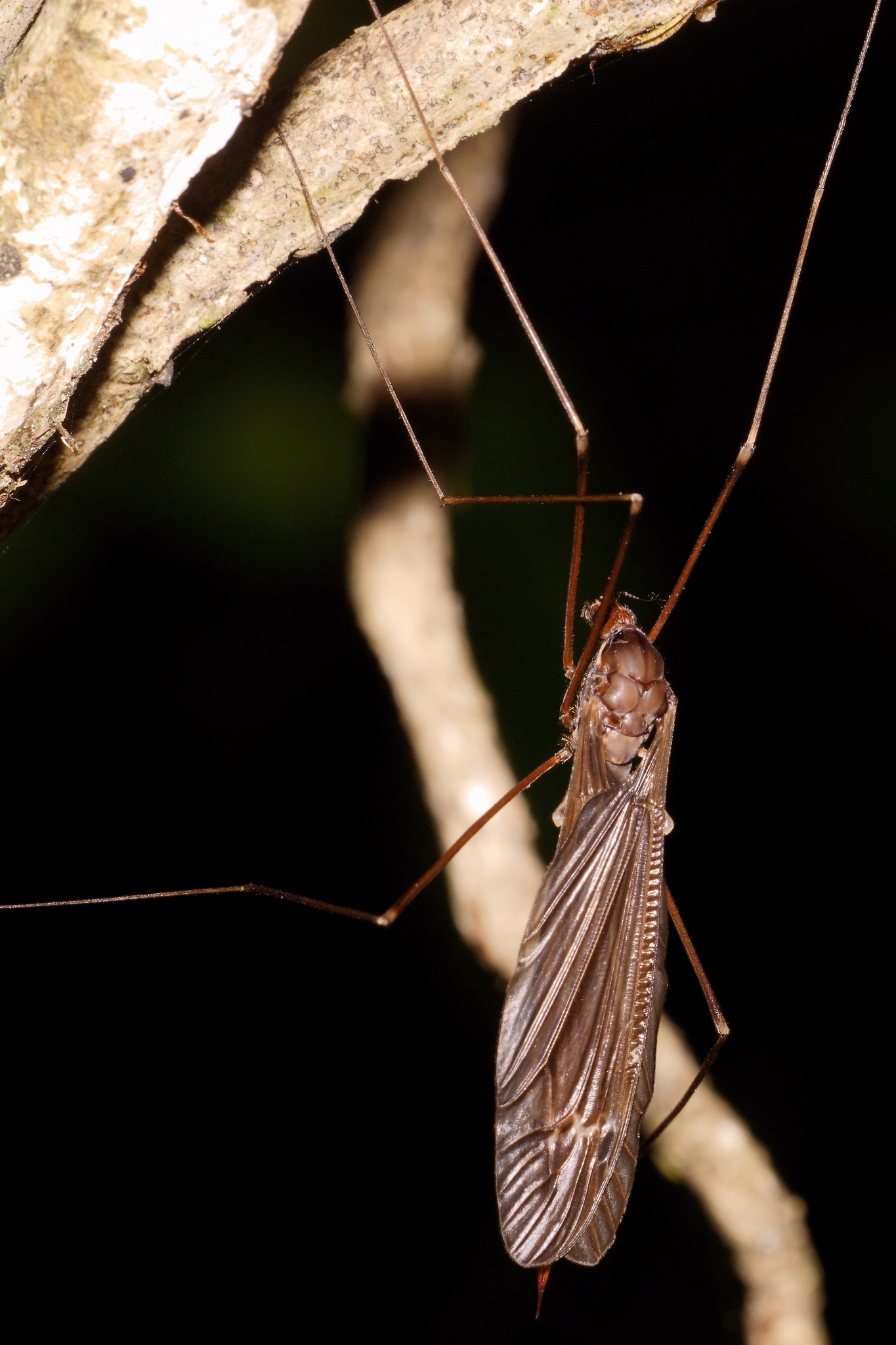

Scientific classification
- Kingdom: Animalia
- Phylum: Arthropoda
- Class: Insecta
- Order: Diptera
- Family: Tipulidae
- Subfamily: Tipulinae
- Genus: Austrotipula; Alexander, 1920

Type species
- Pachyrhina hudsoni Hutton, 1900

Species
- see text

= Austrotipula =

Genus of flies

Austrotipula is a genus of true crane fly.

== Distribution ==
New Zealand.

== Species ==
- A. hudsoni (Hutton, 1900)
