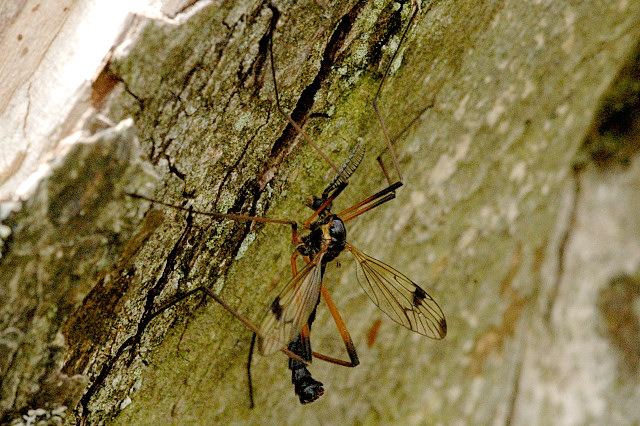
- Dictenidia bimaculata male

Scientific classification
- Domain: Eukaryota
- Kingdom: Animalia
- Phylum: Arthropoda
- Class: Insecta
- Order: Diptera
- Family: Tipulidae
- Subfamily: Ctenophorinae
- Genus: Dictenidia; Brulle, 1833

Type species
- Tipula pectinicornis Linnaeus, 1760

Species
- See text

= Dictenidia =

Genus of flies

Dictenidia is a genus of true crane flies.

== Species ==
- D. bimaculata (Linnaeus, 1760)
- D. formosana Alexander, 1920
- D. glabrata Alexander, 1938
- D. inaequipectinata Alexander, 1934
- D. knutsoni Yang & Yang, 1989
- D. luteicostalis Alexander, 1936
- D. manipurana (Alexander, 1970)
- D. miyatakei Alexander, 1953
- D. partialis Yang & Yang, 1989
- D. pictipennis (Portschinsky, 1887)
- D. rhadinoclada (Alexander, 1970)
- D. sauteri Enderlein, 1921
- D. sichuanensis Yang & Yang, 1989
- D. stalactitica Alexander, 1941
- D. subpartialis Yang & Yang, 1989
