= Elnoretta =

Scientific classification
- Kingdom: Animalia
- Phylum: Arthropoda
- Class: Insecta
- Order: Diptera
- Family: Tipulidae
- Subfamily: Tipulinae
- Genus: Elnoretta; Alexander, 1929

Type species
- Elnoretta acracanthoides Alexander, 1929

Species
- see text

Genus of flies

Elnoretta is a genus of true crane fly.

== Distribution ==
Chile.

== Species ==
- E. acracanthoides Alexander, 1929
