= Prionota =

Scientific classification
- Kingdom: Animalia
- Phylum: Arthropoda
- Class: Insecta
- Order: Diptera
- Family: Tipulidae
- Subfamily: Tipulinae
- Genus: Prionota van der Wulp, 1885

Type species
- Prionota nigriceps van der Wulp, 1885

Subgenera
- Plocimas Enderlein, 1921; Prionota van der Wulp, 1885

Genus of flies

Prionota is a genus of true crane fly.

== Distribution ==
China, Indonesia, India & Sri Lanka.

== Species ==
- Subgenus Plocimas Enderlein, 1921

- P. guangdongensis Yang & Young, 2007
- P. magnifica (Enderlein, 1921)
- P. serraticornis (Brunetti, 1911)

- Subgenus Prionota van der Wulp, 1885

- P. flaviceps (Enderlein, 1912)
- P. nigriceps van der Wulp, 1885
- P. seguyi Alexander, 1923
- P. serrata (van der Wulp, 1885)
- P. xanthomelana (Walker, 1848)
