= Goniotipula =

Scientific classification
- Kingdom: Animalia
- Phylum: Arthropoda
- Class: Insecta
- Order: Diptera
- Family: Tipulidae
- Subfamily: Tipulinae
- Genus: Goniotipula; Alexander, 1921

Type species
- Goniotipula cuneipennis Alexander, 1921

Species
- see text

Genus of flies

Goniotipula is a genus of true crane fly.

== Distribution ==
The Goniotipula is only found in South Africa.

== Species ==
- G. cuneipennis Alexander, 1921
- G. lindneri Mannheims, 1961
