= Tipulodina =

Scientific classification
- Kingdom: Animalia
- Phylum: Arthropoda
- Clade: Pancrustacea
- Class: Insecta
- Order: Diptera
- Family: Tipulidae
- Subfamily: Tipulinae
- Genus: Tipulodina; Enderlein, 1912

Type species
- Tipulodina magnicornis Enderlein, 1912

Species
- See text

Genus of flies

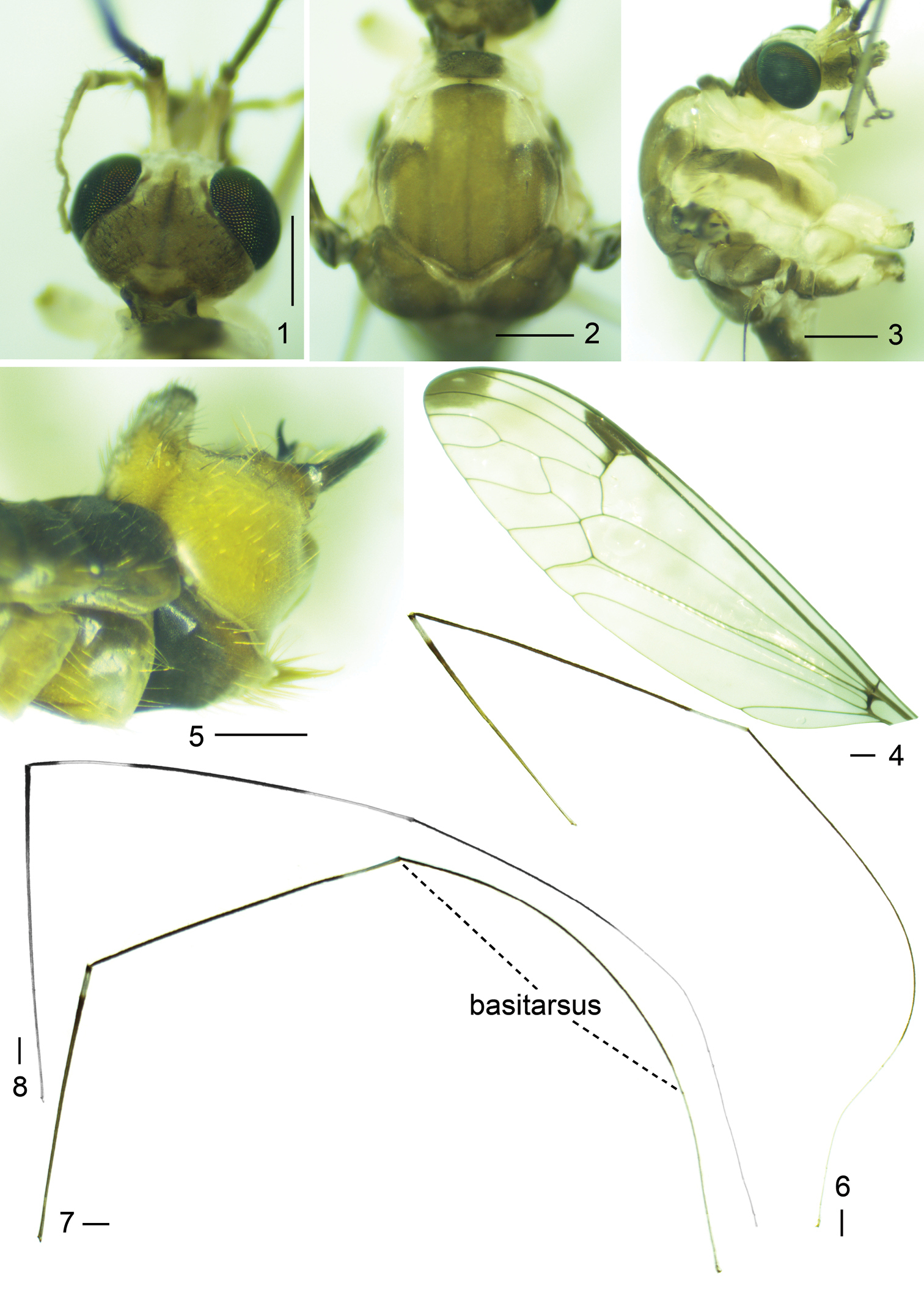

Tipulodina is a genus of true crane flies.

== Species ==
- T. aetherea (de Meijere, 1916)
- T. albiprivata (Edwards, 1926)
- T. amabilis (Alexander, 1938)
- T. barraudi (Edwards, 1932)
- T. bifurcata Xue and Men, 2019
- T. brevigladia (Alexander, 1968)
- T. brunettiella (Alexander, 1923)
- T. cagayanensis Alexander, 1930
- T. cantonensis (Alexander, 1938)
- T. ceylonica (Edwards, 1927)
- T. cinctipes (de Meijere, 1911)
- T. contigua (Brunetti, 1918)
- T. curtissima (Alexander, 1948)
- T. deprivata (Alexander, 1932)
- T. dyak (Alexander, 1951)
- T. felicita (Alexander, 1968)
- T. forficuloides (Alexander, 1957)
- T. fumifinis (Walker, 1860)
- T. fuscitarsis (Edwards, 1925)
- T. gracillima (Brunetti, 1912)
- T. hopeiensis (Alexander, 1936)
- T. jigongshana Yang, 1999
- T. joana (Alexander, 1919)
- T. koreana (Baek and Bae, 2016)
- T. lumpurensis (Edwards, 1932)
- T. luzonica Alexander, 1925
- T. magnicornis Enderlein, 1912
- T. malabarensis (Alexander, 1960)
- T. mcclureana (Alexander, 1968)
- T. mckeani (Cockerell, 1929)
- T. micracantha Alexander, 1924
- T. monozona (Edwards, 1932)
- T. nettingi (Young, 1999)
- T. nipponica (Alexander, 1923)
- T. pampangensis Alexander, 1931
- T. patricia (Brunetti, 1912)
- T. pedata (Wiedemann, 1821)
- T. phasmatodes (Young, 1999)
- T. sandersoni (Edwards, 1932)
- T. scimitar Alexander, 1924
- T. sidapurensis (Edwards, 1932)
- T. simianshanensis Men, 2019
- T. simillima (Brunetti, 1918)
- T. subscimitar (Alexander, 1958)
- T. succinipennis Alexander, 1930
- T. susainathani (Alexander, 1968)
- T. tabuanensis Alexander, 1930
- T. taiwanica Alexander, 1923
- T. thaiensis (Alexander, 1974)
- T. tinctipes (Edwards, 1925)
- T. varitarsis (Alexander, 1932)
- T. venusta (Walker, 1848)
- T. xanthippe (Alexander, 1951)
- T. xyris (Alexander, 1949)
- T. zetterstedtiana (Alexander, 1971)
