= Idiotipula =

Scientific classification
- Kingdom: Animalia
- Phylum: Arthropoda
- Class: Insecta
- Order: Diptera
- Family: Tipulidae
- Subfamily: Tipulinae
- Genus: Idiotipula; Alexander, 1921

Type species
- Idiotipula confluens Alexander, 1921

Species
- see text

Genus of flies

Idiotipula is a genus of true crane fly.

== Distribution ==
South Africa

== Species ==
- I. confluens Alexander, 1921
