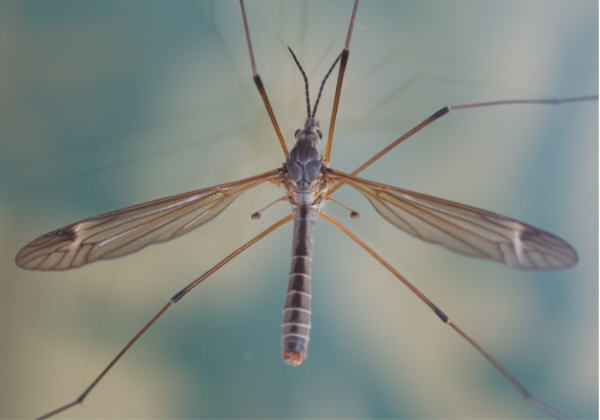
- Prionocera turcica, male.

Scientific classification
- Kingdom: Animalia
- Phylum: Arthropoda
- Class: Insecta
- Order: Diptera
- Family: Tipulidae
- Subfamily: Tipulinae
- Genus: Prionocera; Loew, 1844

Type species
- Prionocera pubescens Loew, 1844

Species
- see text

Synonyms
- Stygeropis Loew, 1863

= Prionocera =

Genus of flies

Prionocera is a genus of true crane fly.

== Species ==
- P. abscondita Lackschewitz, 1933
- P. byersi Brodo, 1987
- P. chosenicola Alexander, 1945
- P. cryptica Brodo, 1987
- P. dimidiata (Loew, 1866)
- P. electa Alexander, 1927
- P. mannheimsi Savchenko, 1983
- P. naskapi Brodo, 1987
- P. ominosa (Alexander, 1920)
- P. oregonica Alexander, 1943
- P. pubescens Loew, 1844
- P. recta Tjeder, 1948
- P. ringdahli Tjeder, 1948
- P. serenicola Alexander, 1945
- P. serricornis (Zetterstedt, 1838)
- P. setosa Tjeder, 1948
- P. sordida (Loew, 1863)
- P. subserricornis (Zetterstedt, 1851)
- P. subturcica Savchenko, 1983
- P. turcica (Fabricius, 1787)
- P. unimicra (Alexander, 1915)
- P. woodorum Brodo, 1987
