= Sphaerionotus =

Scientific classification
- Kingdom: Animalia
- Phylum: Arthropoda
- Class: Insecta
- Order: Diptera
- Family: Tipulidae
- Subfamily: Tipulinae
- Genus: Sphaerionotus de Meijere, 1919

Type species
- Sphaerionotus curtipennis de Meijere, 1919

Species
- See text

Genus of flies

Sphaerionotus is a genus of true crane fly.

== Distribution ==
Indonesia & Malaysia.

== Species ==
- S. curtipennis de Meijere, 1919
- S. fasciatus Edwards, 1928
- S. vittatus Edwards, 1933
