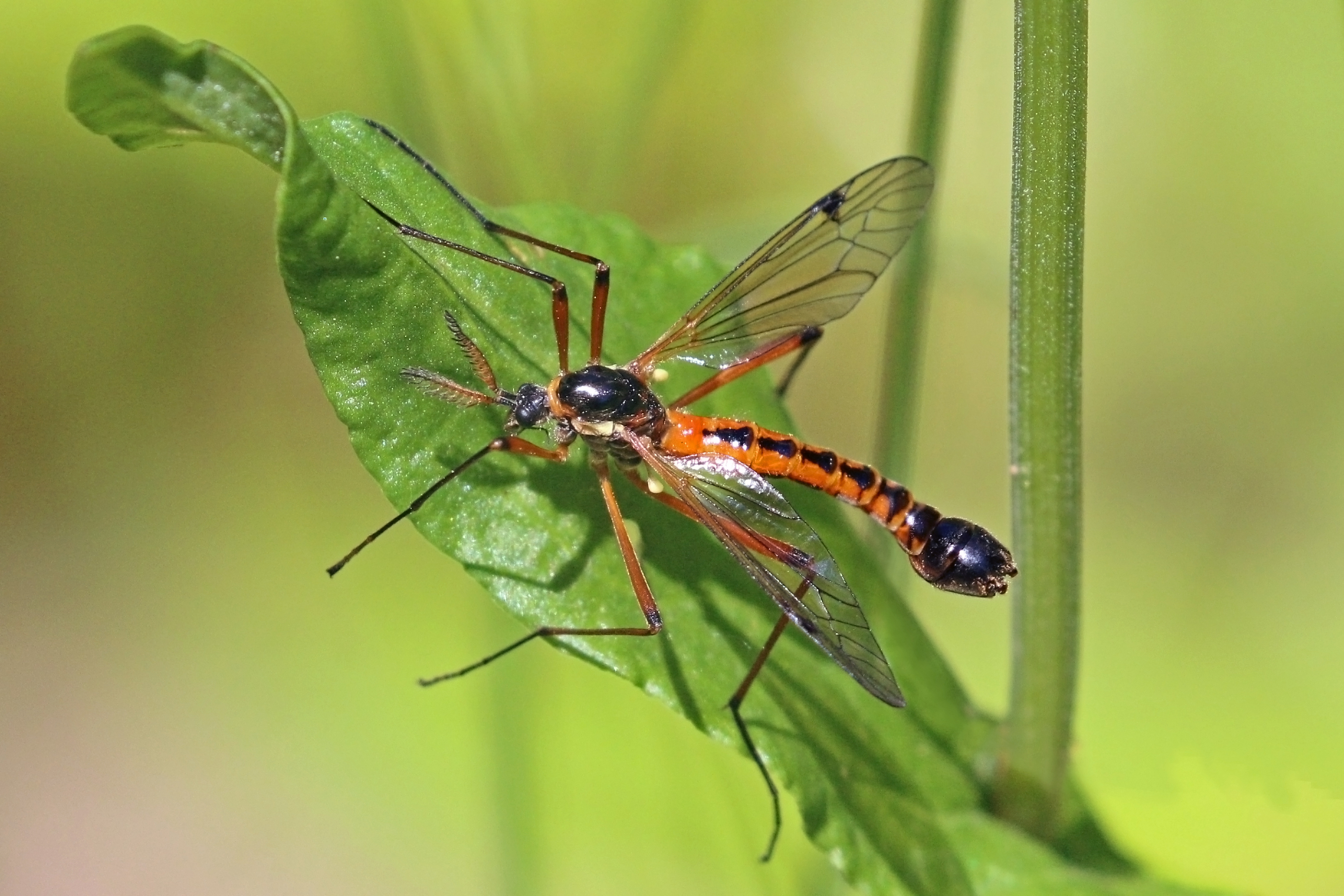
- male Tanyptera atrata

Scientific classification
- Kingdom: Animalia
- Phylum: Arthropoda
- Class: Insecta
- Order: Diptera
- Family: Tipulidae
- Subfamily: Ctenophorinae
- Genus: Tanyptera; Latreille, 1804

Type species
- Tipula atrata Linnaeus, 1758

Subgenera
- Mesodictenidia Matsumura, 1931; Tanyptera Latreille, 1804

Synonyms
- Flabellifera Meigen, 1800; Xiphura Brulle, 1832; Xiphusa authors

= Tanyptera =

Genus of flies

Tanyptera is a genus of true crane flies; its species are lustrous and black and yellow or red in color. They resemble some Ichneumonidae. Segments of the flagella of males have three outgrowths each (two lower paired and the upper one unpaired). The antennae of the females are distinctly 13-segmented. The sides of the mesothorax are glabrous. The ovipositor of the female is unusually long, the valves being only slightly shorter than the cerci. Tanyptera spp. exhibit extreme polymorphism in the body colour and body size of the sexes. The wing colors also vary from smoky-black, brown, or brownish-yellow, to transparent.

Their habitat is deciduous and mixed forests. The larvae live in dead but still hard wood. Tanyptera species are a minor pest in Russia where they are sometimes harmful to forest products. They are found in Europe and Asia.

== Species ==
- Subgenus Mesodictenidia Matsumura, 1931

- T. angustistylus Alexander, 1925
- T. antica Alexander, 1938
- T. cognata Alexander, 1936
- T. digitata Yang & Yang, 1988
- T. gracilis (Portschinsky, 1873)
- T. perangusta Alexander, 1953
- T. stackelbergiana Savchenko, 1973
- T. subcognata Alexander, 1941
- T. tsurugiana Takahashi, 1960

- Subgenus Tanyptera Latreille, 1804

- T. atrata (Linnaeus, 1758)
- T. brevipecten Alexander, 1955
- T. chrysophaea Alexander, 1941
- T. dorsalis (Walker, 1848)
- T. hebeiensis Yang & Yang, 1988
- T. hubeiensis Yang & Yang, 1988
- T. indica (Brunetti, 1918)
- T. mediana Yang & Yang, 1988
- T. nigricornis (Meigen, 1818)
- T. parva (Portschinsky, 1887)
- T. shennongana Yang & Yang, 1988
- T. trimaculata Yang & Yang, 1988
