= Scamboneura =

Scientific classification
- Kingdom: Animalia
- Phylum: Arthropoda
- Class: Insecta
- Order: Diptera
- Family: Tipulidae
- Subfamily: Tipulinae
- Genus: Scamboneura; Osten Sacken, 1882

Type species
- Scamboneura dotata Osten Sacken, 1882

Genus of flies

Scamboneura is a genus of true crane flies; the majority of species are found in the Philippines.

== Species ==
- S. banahaoensis Alexander, 1931
- S. calianensis Alexander, 1931
- S. citridorsum Alexander, 1931
- S. claggi Alexander, 1931
- S. curtistyla Alexander, 1971
- S. davaoensis Alexander, 1931
- S. dotata Osten Sacken, 1882
- S. faceta Alexander, 1927
- S. hirtisternata Alexander, 1930
- S. minahasa Alexander, 1934
- S. mindanaoensis Alexander, 1931
- S. nigrodorsalis Alexander, 1947
- S. nigrotergata Alexander, 1931
- S. opacinotum Alexander, 1931
- S. plumbea Alexander, 1922
- S. primaeva Alexander, 1929
- S. primogenia Alexander, 1931
- S. psarophanes Alexander, 1927
- S. quadrata de Meijere, 1914
- S. subdotata Alexander, 1931
- S. subfaceta Alexander, 1934
- S. subtransversa Alexander, 1931
- S. sumatrensis Alexander, 1937
- S. tagensis Alexander, 1961
- S. vittifrons (Walker, 1860)
- S. vittivertex Alexander 1930
