= Angarotipula =

Scientific classification
- Kingdom: Animalia
- Phylum: Arthropoda
- Class: Insecta
- Order: Diptera
- Family: Tipulidae
- Subfamily: Tipulinae
- Genus: Angarotipula; Savchenko, 1961

Type species
- Tipula tumidicornis Lundstrom, 1907

Species
- see text

Genus of flies

Angarotipula is a genus of true crane fly.

== Distribution ==
China, India, Canada, United States, Russia, Finland, Norway, Sweden, Mongolia.

== Species ==
- A. altivolans (Alexander, 1935)
- A. frommeri (Alexander, 1966)
- A. heilongjiangana Yang & Yang, 1995
- A. illustris (Doane, 1901)
- A. indica (Edwards, 1926)
- A. laetipennis (Alexander, 1935)
- A. parrioides (Alexander, 1919)
- A. qinghaiensis Yang & Yang, 1996
- A. rubzovi (Savchenko, 1961)
- A. snodgrassiana (Alexander, 1966)
- A. tokunagana (Alexander, 1964)
- A. tumidicornis (Lundstrom, 1907)
- A. xuthoptera (Alexander, 1966)
