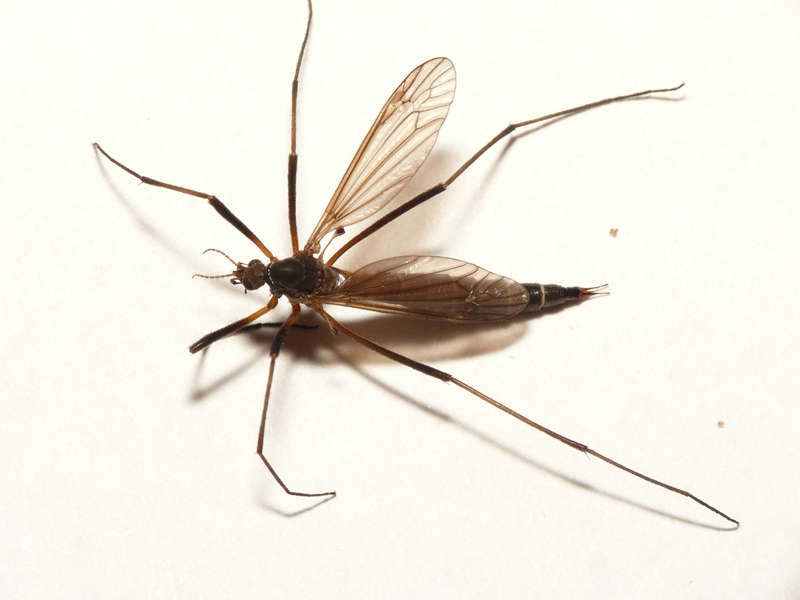
- Nigrotipula nigra

Scientific classification
- Kingdom: Animalia
- Phylum: Arthropoda
- Class: Insecta
- Order: Diptera
- Family: Tipulidae
- Subfamily: Tipulinae
- Genus: Nigrotipula; Hudson & Vane-Wright, 1969

Type species
- Tipula nigra Linnaeus, 1758

Species
- see text

Synonyms
- Anomaloptera Lioy, 1863

= Nigrotipula =

Genus of flies

Nigrotipula is a genus of true crane fly.

== Distribution ==
Palaearctic & India.

== Species ==
- N. achlypoda (Alexander, 1966)
- N. bathroxantha (Alexander, 1961)
- N. nigra (Linnaeus, 1758)
- N. xanthocera (Alexander, 1936)
- N. zhejiangensis Yang & Yang, 1995
