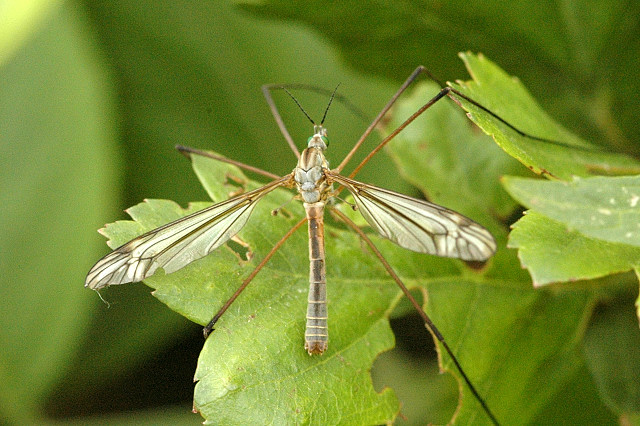
- Tipula luna male

Scientific classification
- Kingdom: Animalia
- Phylum: Arthropoda
- Clade: Pancrustacea
- Class: Insecta
- Order: Diptera
- Family: Tipulidae
- Genus: Tipula
- Subgenus: Acutipula
- Species: T. luna

Binomial name
- Tipula luna Westhoff, 1879

Synonyms
- Tipula lunata Meigen, 1818

= Tipula luna =

Species of fly

Tipula luna is a species of true cranefly. It is commonly known as the moon cranefly.

== Etymology ==
The moon cranefly gets its common name from its scientific name, Tipula luna. When translated to English, 'luna' becomes 'moon'.

== Distribution ==
The moon cranefly is native to Europe, where it is widespread throughout the whole continent.
