= Brithura =

Scientific classification
- Kingdom: Animalia
- Phylum: Arthropoda
- Class: Insecta
- Order: Diptera
- Family: Tipulidae
- Subfamily: Tipulinae
- Genus: Brithura; Edwards, 1916

Type species
- Tipula dispellens Edwards, 1916 [= imperfecta (Brunetti, 1913)]

Species
- see text

Genus of flies

Brithura is a genus of true crane fly.

== Distribution ==
India, Taiwan and China.

== Species ==
- B. argyrospila (Alexander, 1935)
- B. brulleana (Alexander, 1971)
- B. crassa Edwards, 1916
- B. fracticosta (Alexander, 1935)
- B. fractistigma Alexander, 1925
- B. guangxiensis Liu and Yang, 2009
- B. imperfecta (Brunetti, 1913)
- B. jinpingensis Liu and Yang, 2009
- B. keiliniana (Alexander, 1971)
- B. nielseniana (Alexander, 1964)
- B. nymphica Alexander, 1927
- B. sancta Alexander, 1929
