= Keiseromyia =

Scientific classification
- Kingdom: Animalia
- Phylum: Arthropoda
- Class: Insecta
- Order: Diptera
- Family: Tipulidae
- Subfamily: Tipulinae
- Genus: Keiseromyia; Alexander, 1963

Type species
- Keiseromyia polyphragma Alexander, 1963

Species
- see text

Genus of flies

Keiseromyia is a genus of true crane fly.

== Distribution ==
Madagascar

== Species ==
- K. polyphragma Alexander, 1963
