= Macgregoromyia =

Scientific classification
- Kingdom: Animalia
- Phylum: Arthropoda
- Class: Insecta
- Order: Diptera
- Family: Tipulidae
- Subfamily: Tipulinae
- Genus: Macgregoromyia; Alexander, 1929

Type species
- Macgregoromyia benguetensis Alexander, 1929

Species
- see text

Genus of flies

Macgregoromyia is a genus of true crane fly in the family Tipulidae.

== Distribution ==
Macgregoromyia species can be found throughout Japan, Philippines, China, and Malaysia.

== Species ==
- M. babana Alexander, 1969
- M. benguetensis Alexander, 1929
- M. brevicula Alexander, 1933
- M. brevisector Alexander, 1931
- M. celestia Alexander, 1932
- M. flatusa Liu & Yang, 2011
- M. fohkienensis Alexander, 1949
- M. itoi Alexander, 1955
- M. perpendicularis Edwards, 1932
- M. rectangularis Liu & Yang, 2011
- M. shikokuana Alexander, 1954
- M. sikkimensis Alexander, 1962
- M. syusiro Alexander, 1955
- M. szechwanensis Alexander, 1932
- M. ternifoliusa Liu & Yang, 2011
