= Valdiviana =

Scientific classification
- Kingdom: Animalia
- Phylum: Arthropoda
- Class: Insecta
- Order: Diptera
- Family: Tipulidae
- Subfamily: Tipulinae
- Genus: Valdiviana; Alexander, 1929

Type species
- Valdiviana edwardsina Alexander, 1929

Species
- See text

Genus of flies

Valdiviana is a genus of true crane fly.

== Distribution ==
Argentina, Chile.

== Species ==
- V. edwardsina Alexander, 1929
- V. shannonina Alexander, 1929
- V. synempora Alexander, 1929
