= Indotipula =

Scientific classification
- Kingdom: Animalia
- Phylum: Arthropoda
- Class: Insecta
- Order: Diptera
- Family: Tipulidae
- Subfamily: Tipulinae
- Genus: Indotipula; Edwards, 1931

Type species
- Tipula walkeri (Brunetti, 1911)

Species
- see text

Genus of flies

Indotipula is a genus of true crane fly.

== Distribution ==
Asia

== Species ==
- I. acentrota (Edwards, 1932)
- I. angustilobata (Alexander, 1932)
- I. apicidilata (Alexander, 1964)
- I. audcentiana (Alexander, 1966)
- I. belingana (Alexander, 1966)
- I. blandita (Alexander, 1953)
- I. brachycantha (Alexander, 1949)
- I. brevivittata (Edwards, 1932)
- I. chandra (Alexander, 1971)
- I. cinctoterminalis (Brunetti, 1912)
- I. demarcata (Brunetti, 1911)
- I. diacaena (Alexander, 1961)
- I. dilatistyla (Alexander, 1949)
- I. divisa (Brunetti, 1911)
- I. elegantula (Brunetti, 1912)
- I. fuscoangustata (Alexander, 1930)
- I. gedehicola (Alexander, 1915)
- I. gracilis (Brunetti, 1911)
- I. gupta (Alexander, 1961)
- I. gurneyana (Alexander, 1978)
- I. ifugao (Alexander, 1932)
- I. itoana (Alexander, 1955)
- I. kinabaluensis (Edwards, 1933)
- I. korinchiensis (Edwards, 1919)
- I. laffooniana (Alexander, 1971)
- I. latilobata (Alexander, 1932)
- I. leucopyga (van der Wulp, 1885)
- I. malaica (Edwards, 1932)
- I. manobo (Alexander, 1932)
- I. melacantha (Alexander, 1961)
- I. melanodonta (Alexander, 1978)
- I. mendax (Alexander, 1924)
- I. nigrinervis (Edwards, 1927)
- I. nudicaudata (Edwards, 1932)
- I. okinawensis (Alexander, 1932)
- I. palnica (Edwards, 1932)
- I. pandava (Alexander, 1961)
- I. peusiana (Alexander, 1966)
- I. prolata (Alexander, 1961)
- I. pugionis (Alexander, 1961)
- I. quadrispicata (Alexander, 1933)
- I. querella (Alexander, 1948)
- I. riverai (Alexander, 1927)
- I. serritergata (Alexander, 1947)
- I. simlensis (Edwards, 1932)
- I. sinabangensis (de Meijere, 1916)
- I. singhalica (Alexander & Alexander, 1973)
- I. stylacuta (Alexander, 1971)
- I. subdilata (Alexander, 1961)
- I. subvaruna (Alexander, 1971)
- I. sudra (Alexander, 1961)
- I. suensoni (Alexander, 1925)
- I. tetracantha (Alexander, 1928)
- I. tetradolos (Alexander, 1970)
- I. tjibodensis (Alexander, 1915)
- I. tukvarensis (Edwards, 1932)
- I. ubensis (Alexander, 1932)
- I. varuna (Alexander, 1961)
- I. vilis (Walker, 1856)
- I. walkeri (Brunetti, 1911)
- I. wulpiana (Alexander, 1968)
- I. yamata (Alexander, 1914)
