= Ozodicera =

Scientific classification
- Kingdom: Animalia
- Phylum: Arthropoda
- Clade: Pancrustacea
- Class: Insecta
- Order: Diptera
- Family: Tipulidae
- Subfamily: Tipulinae
- Genus: Ozodicera; Macquart, 1834

Type species
- Ozodicera ochracea Macquart, 1834 [= pectinata (Wiedemann, 1828)]

Subgenera
- Dihexaclonus Enderlein, 1912; Ozodicera Macquart, 1834

Synonyms
- Hemicteina Westwood, 1835

Genus of flies

Ozodicera is a genus of true crane fly.

== Species ==
- Subgenus Dihexaclonus Enderlein, 1912

- O. apicalis Macquart, 1838
- O. biaculeata Alexander, 1954
- O. effecta Alexander, 1944
- O. fumipennis Loew, 1851
- O. gracilirama Alexander, 1941
- O. guianensis Alexander, 1934
- O. jesseana Alexander, 1945
- O. lanei Alexander, 1942
- O. longisector Alexander, 1944
- O. macracantha Alexander, 1940
- O. neivai Alexander, 1940
- O. panamensis Alexander, 1922
- O. perfuga Alexander, 1944
- O. pumila Alexander, 1942
- O. spilophaea Alexander, 1942
- O. superarmata Alexander, 1942
- O. telestyla Alexander, 1969
- O. terrifica Alexander, 1942
- O. triguttata Alexander, 1921
- O. tripallens Alexander, 1942
- O. umbrifera Alexander, 1937
- O. xanthostoma Loew, 1851

- Subgenus Ozodicera Macquart, 1834

- O. attenuata Alexander, 1920
- O. bimaculata Enderlein, 1912
- O. bispinifer Alexander, 1921
- O. carrerella Alexander, 1956
- O. caudifera Alexander, 1945
- O. cinereipennis Alexander, 1937
- O. corrientesana Alexander, 1962
- O. cygniformis Alexander, 1953
- O. duidensis AIexander, 1931
- O. eliana Alexander, 1954
- O. epicosma Alexander, 1926
- O. eurystyla Alexander, 1954
- O. extensa Alexander, 1921
- O. gracilis (Westwood, 1835)
- O. griseipennis Loew, 1851
- O. idiostyla Alexander, 1980
- O. longimana (Fabricius, 1805)
- O. multiermis Alexander, 1942
- O. nigromarginata Alexander, 1938
- O. noctivagans Alexander, 1914
- O. pectinata (Wiedemann, 1828)
- O. phallacantha Alexander, 1942
- O. piatrix Alexander, 1944
- O. placata Alexander, 1966
- O. schwarzmaierana Alexander, 1942
- O. septemtrionis Alexander, 1940
- O. simplex (Walker, 1856)
- O. striatipennis Alexander, 1941
- O. strohmi Alexander, 1945
- O. subvittata Alexander, 1938
- O. thaumasta Alexander, 1954
- O. trispinifer Alexander, 1940
- O. witteana Alexander, 1942
- O. zikaniana Alexander, 1937

== Bibliography ==
- "Catalogue of the Craneflies of the World (Diptera, Tipuloidea: Pediciidae, Limoniidae, Cylindrotomidae, Tipulidae)". Naturalis Biodiversity Center.
