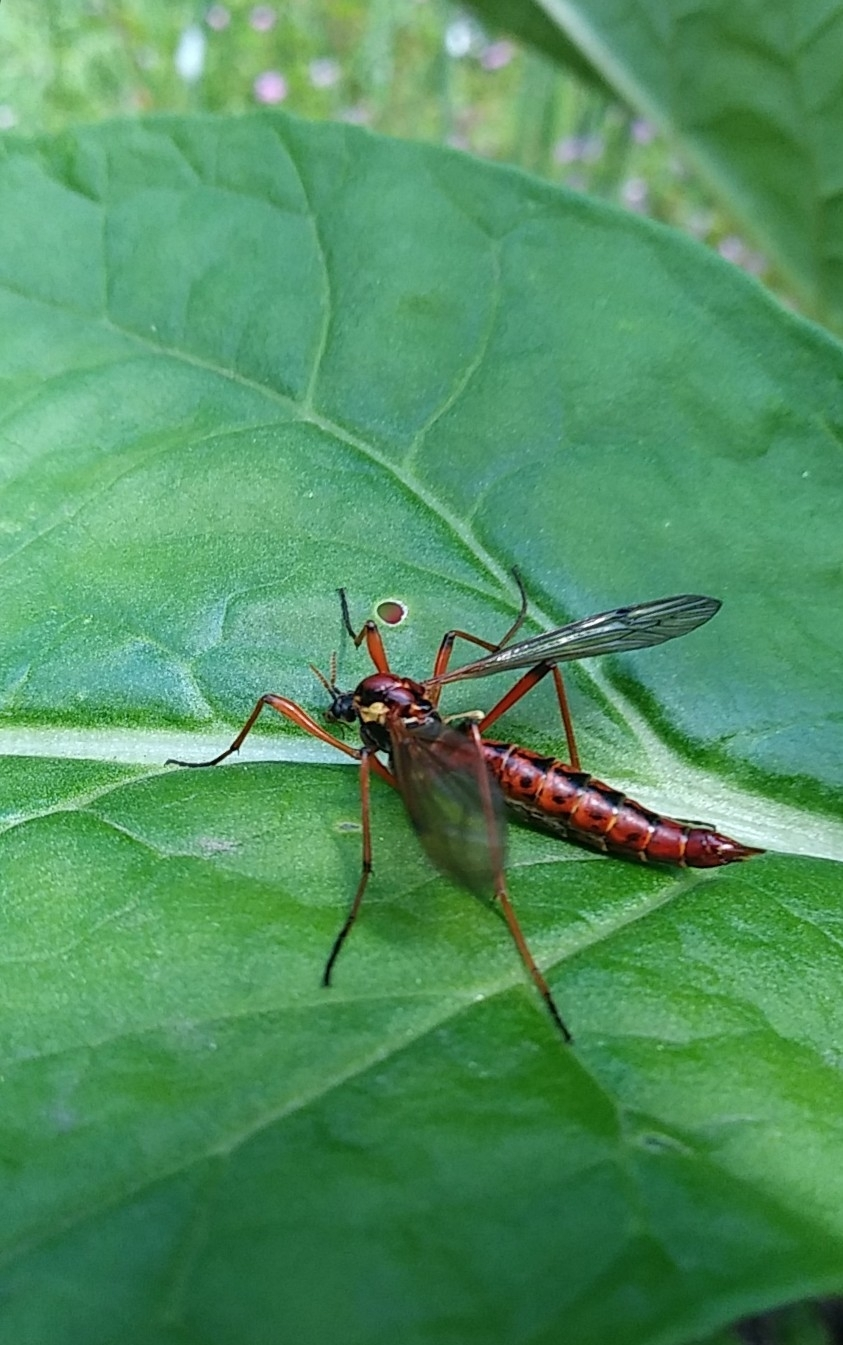
- Phoroctenia vittata

Scientific classification
- Kingdom: Animalia
- Phylum: Arthropoda
- Class: Insecta
- Order: Diptera
- Family: Tipulidae
- Genus: Phoroctenia; Coquillett, 1910

Type species
- Ctenophora angustipennis Loew, 1872

Species
- See text

= Phoroctenia =

Genus of flies

Phoroctenia is a genus of true crane flies found in northern Europe, eastern Russia, and western North America. The only currently described species is P. vittata (Meigen, 1830)
