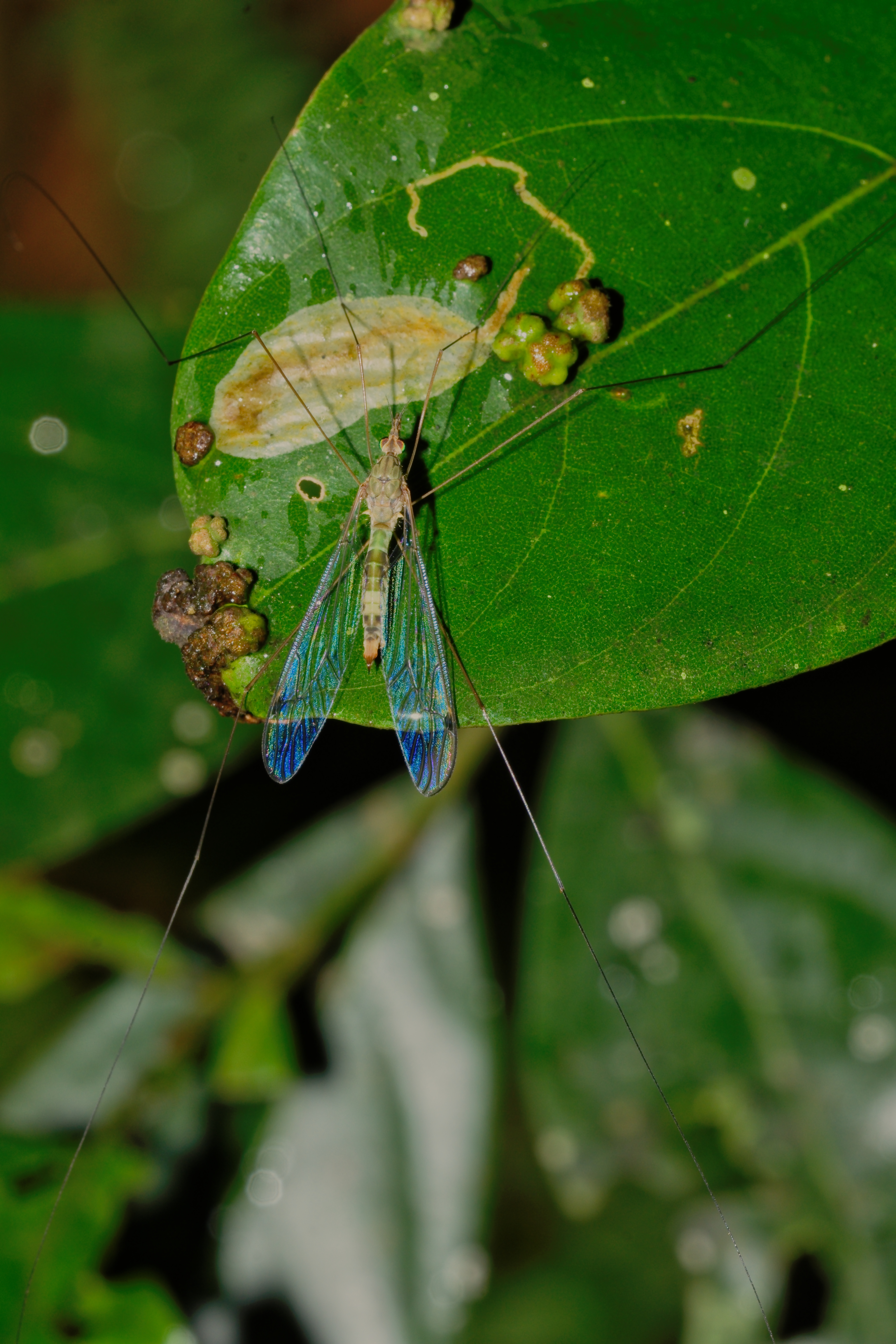
- Maekistocera sp.

Scientific classification
- Kingdom: Animalia
- Phylum: Arthropoda
- Class: Insecta
- Order: Diptera
- Family: Tipulidae
- Subfamily: Tipulinae
- Genus: Maekistocera; Wiedemann, 1820

Type species
- Tipula filipes Fabricius, 1805

Species
- see text

Synonyms
- Megistocera Wiedemann, 1828; Moegistocera Macquart, 1934

= Maekistocera =

Genus of flies

Maekistocera is a genus of true crane fly.

== Distribution ==
Angola, Argentina, Australia, Benin, Bolivia, Brazil, Congo, Cuba, Dominican Republic, Guinea, Guyana, Haiti, India, Indonesia, Jamaica, Madagascar, Malawi, Malaysia, Mozambique, Nigeria, Papua New Guinea, Paraguay, Peru, Philippines, Puerto Rico, Solomon Islands, South Africa, Suriname, Tanzania, Thailand, Trinidad, Uganda, US.

== Species ==
- M. filipes (Fabricius, 1805)
- M. longipennis (Macquart, 1838)
