= Frederick A. Askew Skuse =

British entomologist

Frederick Arthur Askew Skuse (c. 1863 – 10 June 1896) was a British-Australian entomologist.

== Biography ==
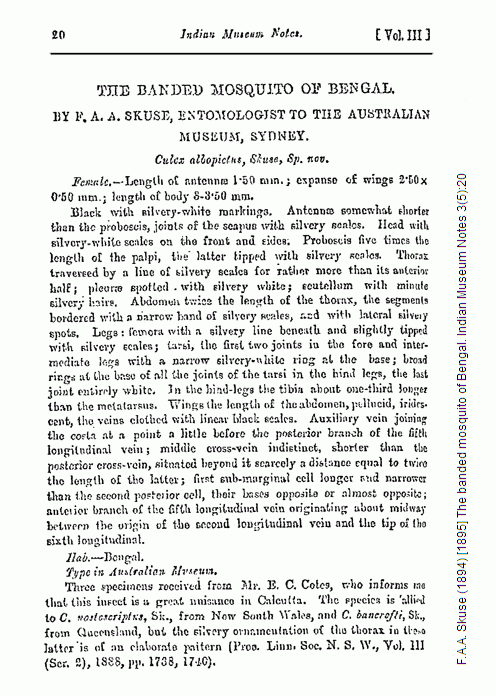
Skuse's description of the Asian tiger mosquito under the name of Culex albopictus

Frederick Arthur Askew Skuse, son of Thomas Edmund and Jane Skuse, was christened on 17 June 1866 at Saint Mary's, Portsea, Portsmouth, England.

He studied at the Natural History Museum in London before leaving for Australia in 1886. He found a position at the Australian Museum in Sydney and worked on the Australian flies collection. In 1890, he was promoted to Scientific Assistant. He held this position until his early death in 1896. He was the first to scientifically describe the Asian tiger mosquito, Aedes albopictus, which he named Culex albopictus.

== Sources ==
- Anthony Musgrave (1932). Bibliography of Australian Entomology, 1775–1930, with biographical notes on authors and collectors, Royal Zoological Society of New South Wales (Sydney): viii + 380.
