= Tipulidae =

Tipulidae Temporal range: Late Jurassic–Recent
- Tipula paludosa

Scientific classification
- Kingdom: Animalia
- Phylum: Arthropoda
- Clade: Pancrustacea
- Class: Insecta
- Order: Diptera
- Infraorder: Tipulomorpha
- Superfamily: Tipuloidea
- Family: Tipulidae; Latreille, 1802

Subfamilies
- Ctenophorinae; Dolichopezinae Podenas & Poinar, 2001; Tipulinae Latreille, 1802

Family of flies

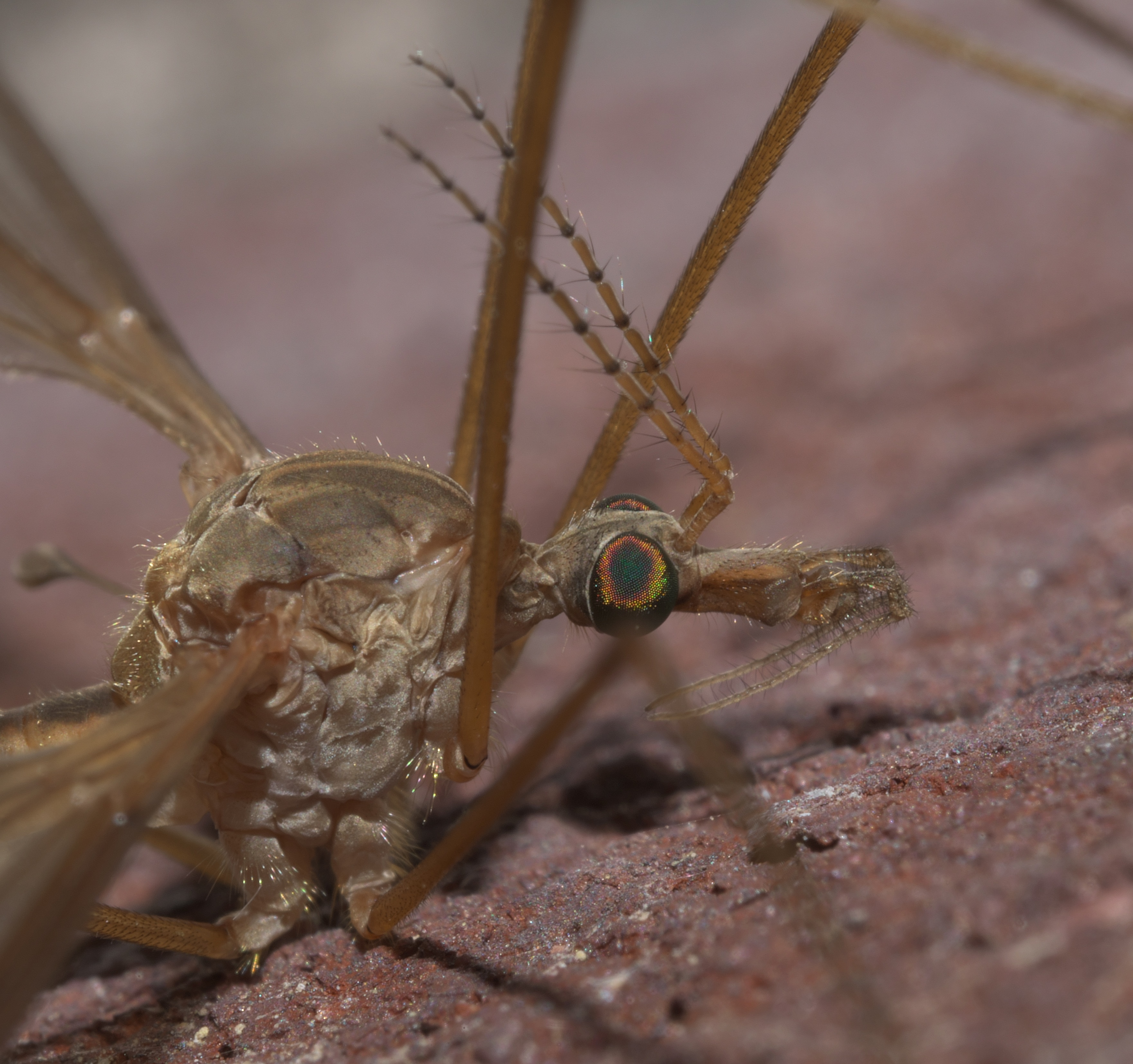
The maxillary palps are the appendages that extend from the front of the head, then down and back, terminating below the eye.

Tipulidae is a family of large crane flies in the order Diptera. There are more than 30 genera and 4,200 described species in Tipulidae, common and widespread throughout the world.

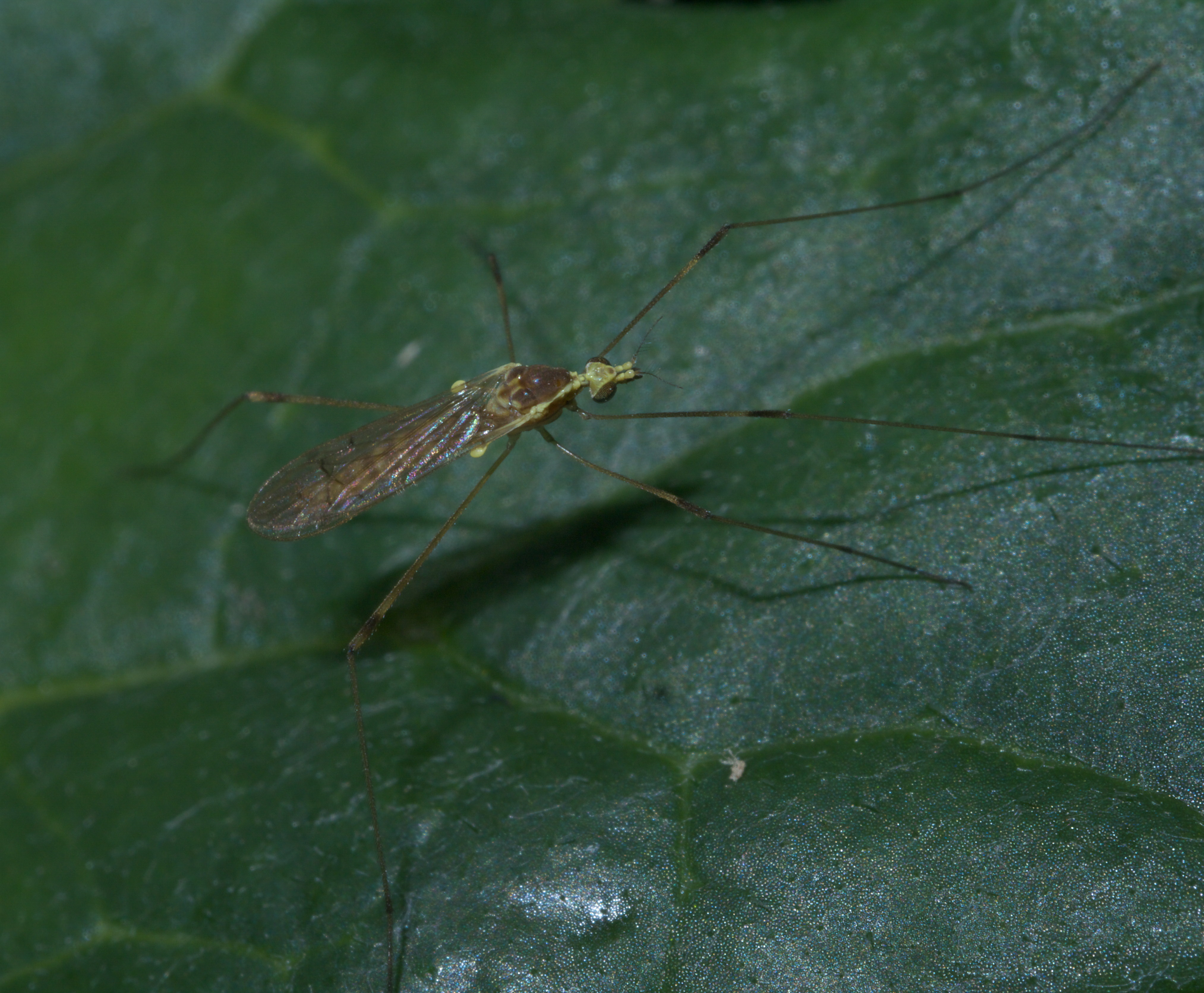
Nephrotoma, tiger crane fly

A crane fly can be identified as a member of Tipulidae by its maxillary palps, which is the pair of appendages that hang down from the front of its head. If the fourth segment (the furthest from the body) of the maxillary palp is longer than the other three combined (alongside the total palp length exceeding that of the head), then it is likely to be a member of Tipulidae. There are also usually 13 segments in the antennae of large crane flies, compared to 14 or 16 in the also-common limoniid crane flies. See for details of morphology.

The oldest fossils that can be assigned confidently to Tipulidae sensu stricto are those of the genus Tipunia, which date to the Late Jurassic.

== Genera ==
These 39 genera belong to the family Tipulidae:

- Acracantha Skuse, 1890
- Angarotipula Savchenko, 1961
- Austrotipula Alexander, 1920
- Brachypremna Osten Sacken, 1886
- Brithura Edwards, 1916
- Clytocosmus Skuse, 1890
- Ctenophora Meigen, 1803
- Dictenidia Brullé 1833
- Dolichopeza Curtis, 1825
- Elnoretta Alexander, 1929
- Euvaldiviana Alexander, 1981
- Goniotipula Alexander, 1921
- Holorusia Loew
- Hovapeza Alexander, 1951
- Hovatipula Alexander, 1955
- Idiotipula Alexander, 1921
- Indotipula Edwards, 1931
- Ischnotoma Skuse, 1890
- Keiseromyia Alexander, 1963
- Leptotarsus Guerin-meneville, 1838
- Macgregoromyia Alexander, 1929
- Maekistocera Wiedemann, 1821
- Nephrotoma Meigen, 1803 (tiger crane flies)
- Nigrotipula Hudson & Vane-Wright, 1969
- Orithea Meigen, 1800
- Ozodicera Macquart, 1834
- Phoroctenia Coquillett, 1910
- Platyphasia Skuse, 1890
- Prionocera Loew, 1844
- Prionota van der Wulp, 1885
- Pselliophora Osten-Sacken, 1887
- Ptilogyna Westwood, 1835
- Scamboneura Osten Sacken, 1882
- Sphaerionotus de Meijere, 1919
- Tanyptera Latreille, 1804
- Tipula Linnaeus, 1758
- Tipulodina Enderlein, 1912
- Valdiviana Alexander, 1929
- Zelandotipula Alexander, 1922

== Ecology ==
Most crane fly larvae are saprophagous, feeding on microbe-rich organic matter, typically decaying plant material in moist environments. However, some species are predacious, fungivorous, or phytophagous. Certain groups have adapted to extreme habitats, including caves, marine intertidal zones, and deserts, although the majority inhabit humid forests and wetlands.
