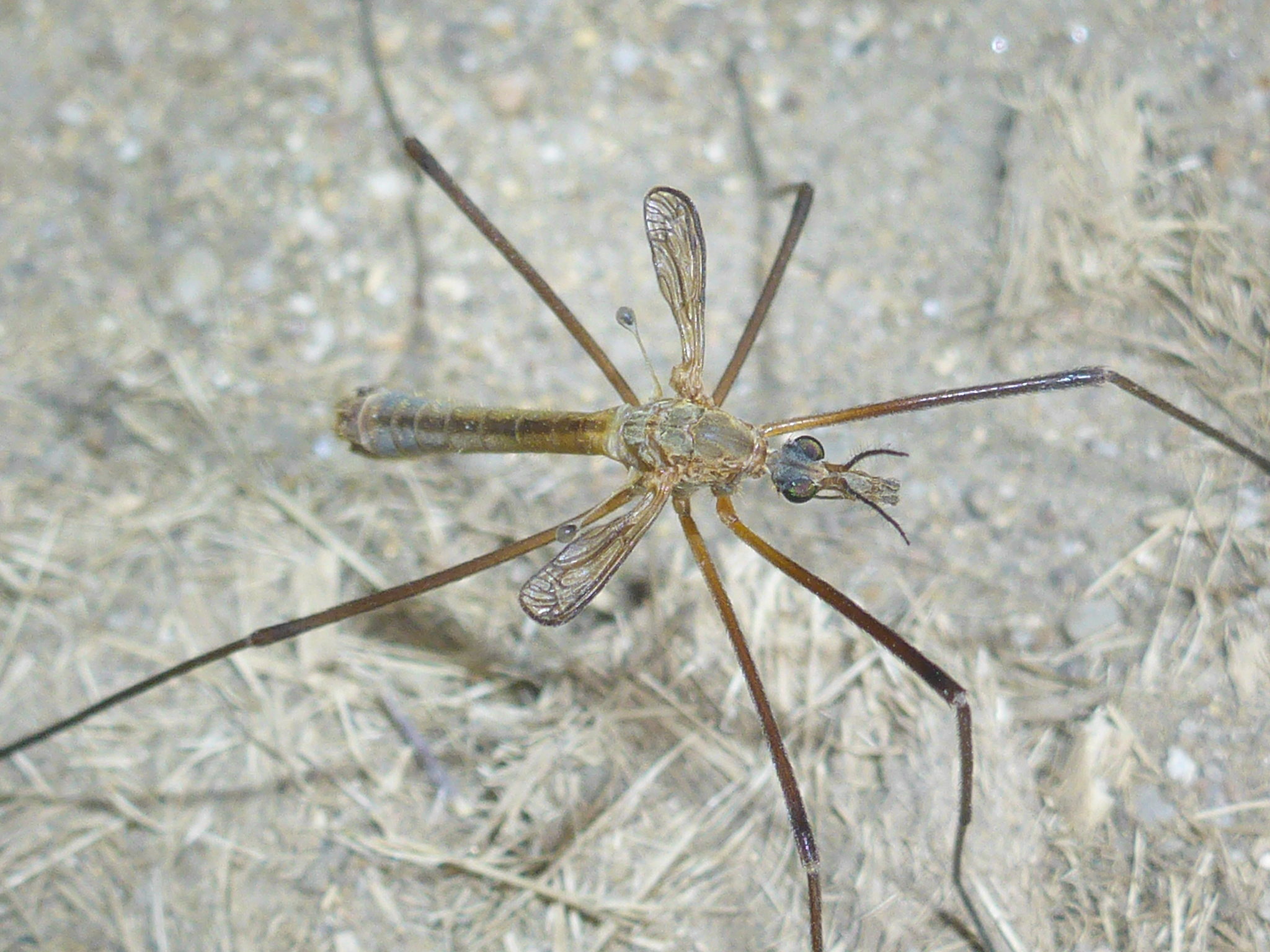
- male specimen of Tipula vestigipennis found in Montara, CA

Scientific classification
- Kingdom: Animalia
- Phylum: Arthropoda
- Clade: Pancrustacea
- Class: Insecta
- Order: Diptera
- Family: Tipulidae
- Genus: Tipula
- Subgenus: Triplicitipula
- Species: T. vestigipennis

Binomial name
- Tipula vestigipennis Doane, 1908

= Tipula vestigipennis =

Species of fly

Tipula vestigipennis is a species of crane fly in the family Tipulidae, found in the western United States.

== Description ==
Males are typically 15mm in body length with a wing length of 5-9mm. Females are typically 22mm in body length with a wing length of 5-6mm.

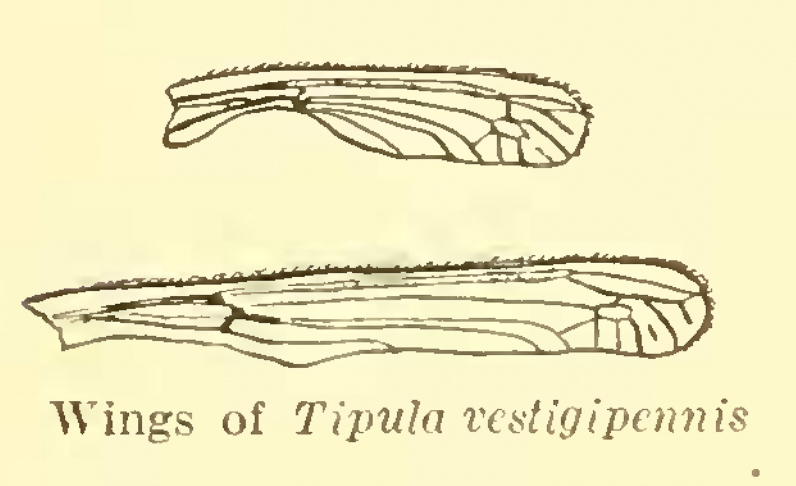
T. Vestigipennis wing diagram

The overall color of the subjects can be described as "brownish yellow". The following is a list of characteristics:

- Yellowish head and rostrum (gray above), sometimes with a brownish stripe
- Palpi is yellowish towards the base and brownish towards the tip
- The first, second, and third segments of the antennae are yellow with the remaining segments brownish and getting darker towards the tip of the antennae
- Each brown antennae segment is furnished with 4-5 stiff hairs
- Collar is yellowish with median and lateral brownish spots
- Dorsum of the thorax is a light yellow
  - Dorsal stripes are yellow
  - Median stripe divided by a broad yellow line
- Pleura and coxae are hairy
- Seutellum is yellow and lighter laterally with a narrow median brown line
- Metanotum is light yellow
- Halteres are yellow with black knobs
- Femora and tibia are yellowish and darker towards the tip
- Tarsi are brownish to blackish
- Abdomen has broad dorsal, lateral, and ventral brown stripes
- Seventh and eighth segments are often almost entirely blackish or brownish
- The posterior margin of the eighth sternite of the male is slightly curved, with a broad shallow median incision which is usually filled with light-colored membrane
  - From this membrane, two tufts of light yellow hairs arise, which cross each other close to the base at about a 45° angle
- Broad sub-triangular chitinized plates are attached to the lateral margins of the eighth sternite which stand at right angles to it
- Posterior margin of the ninth tergite has a broad and shallow circular incision
  - In the middle of this incision, two short triangular processes arise
- The ovipositor is long and stout
  - Straight, acute upper valves
  - Lower valves almost reach the tip of the upper valves
  - Rounded tips

== Range ==
Tipula vestigipennis is found exclusively in San Francisco County and San Mateo County.

== Ecology ==
As with all Triplicitipula, T. vestigipennis is considered a pest. It is destructive to vegetation and crops.

== Taxonomy ==
Tipula vestigipennis was first described by Rennie Wilbur Doane in Psyche (1908).

== Gallery ==
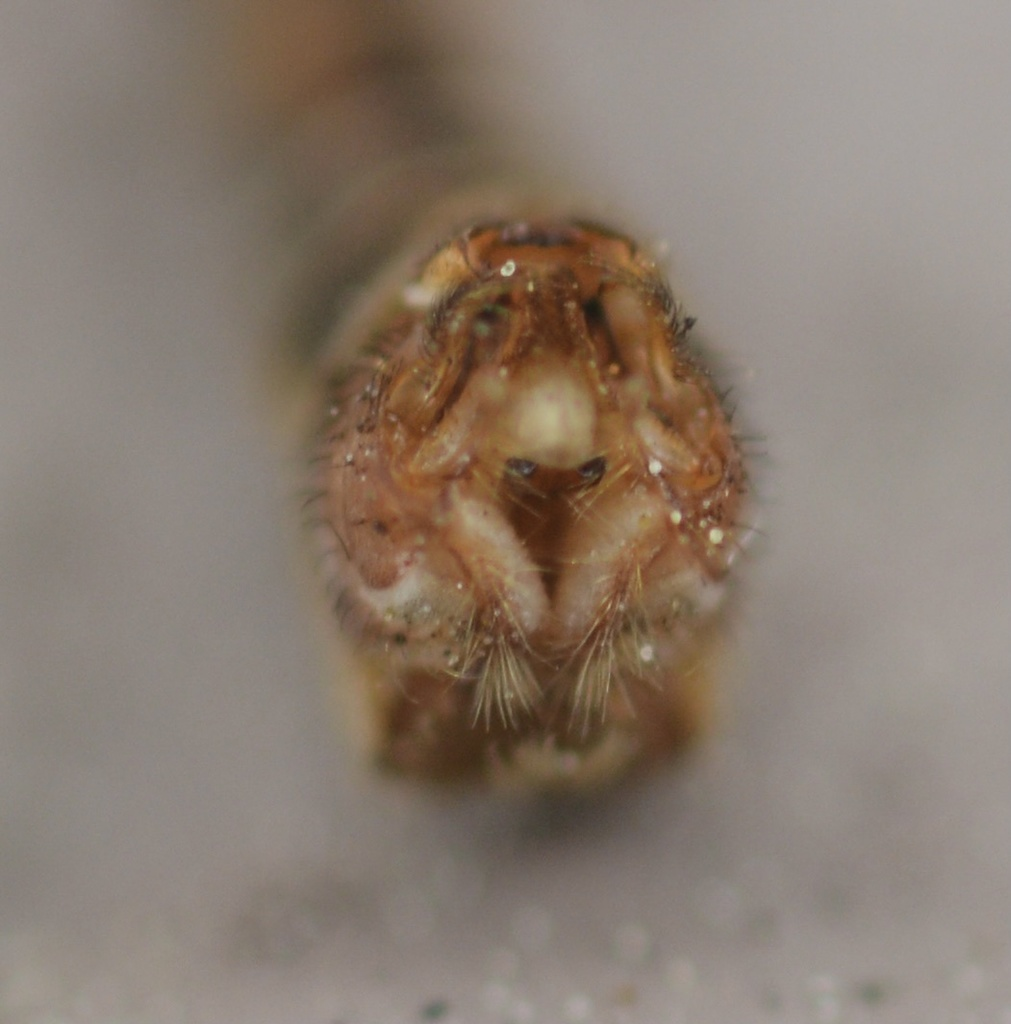
T. vestigipennis hypopygium (male)

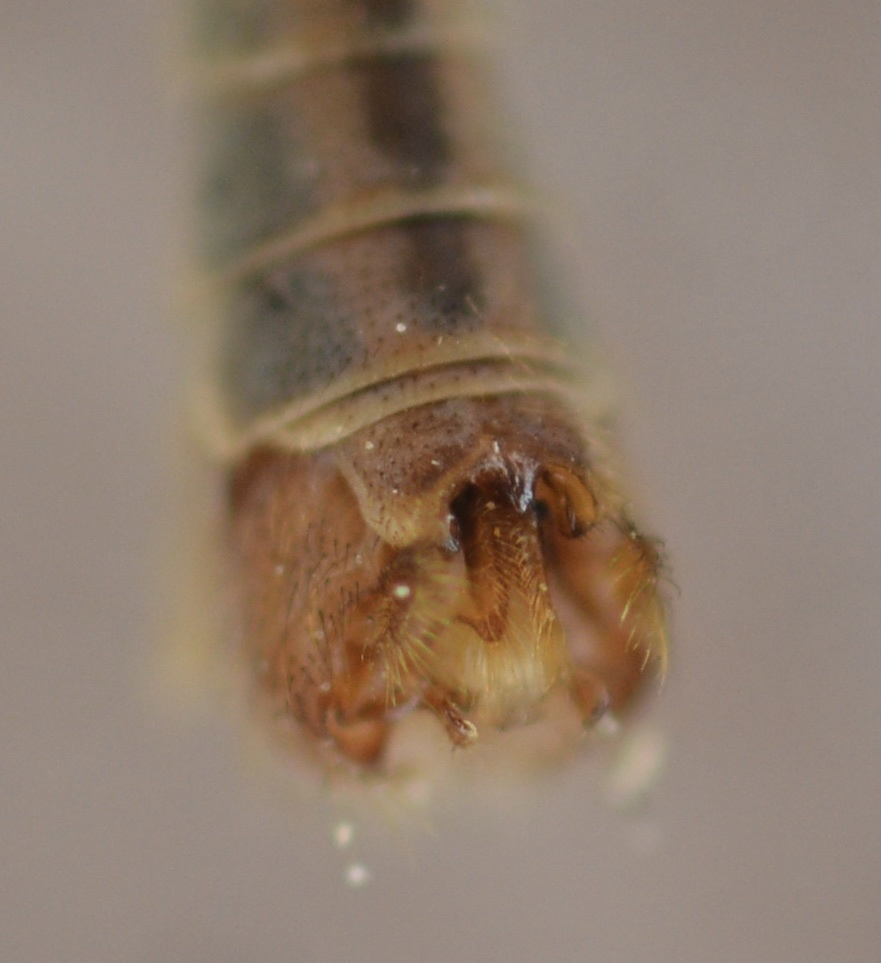
T. vestigipennis hypopygium (male)

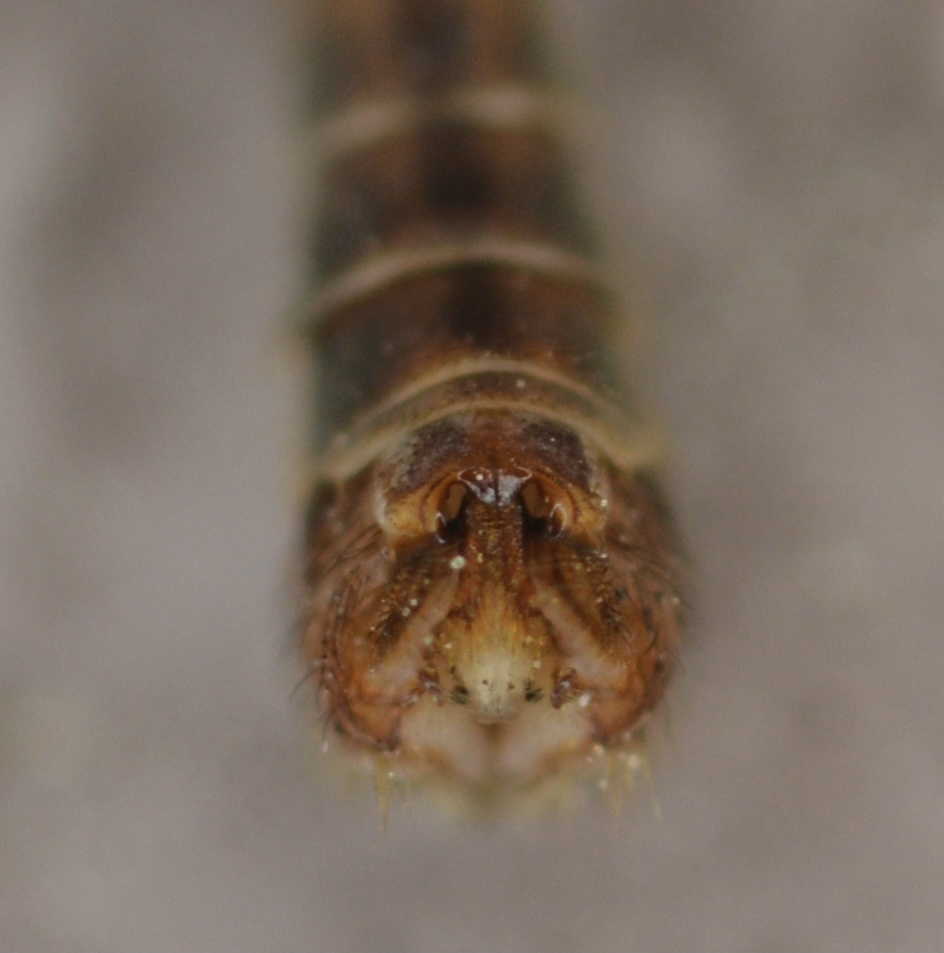
T. vestigipennis hypopygium (male)

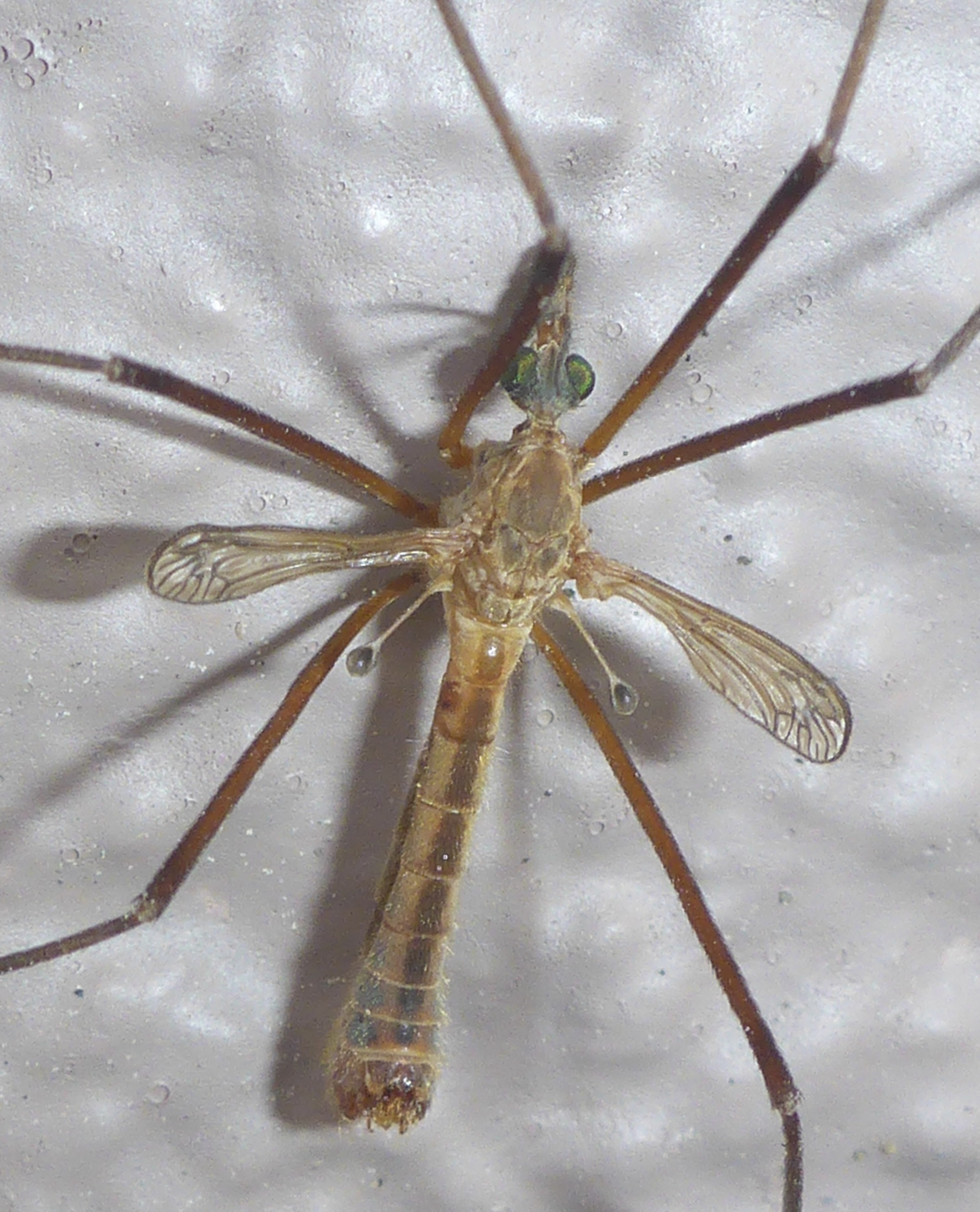
T. vestigipennis male specimen

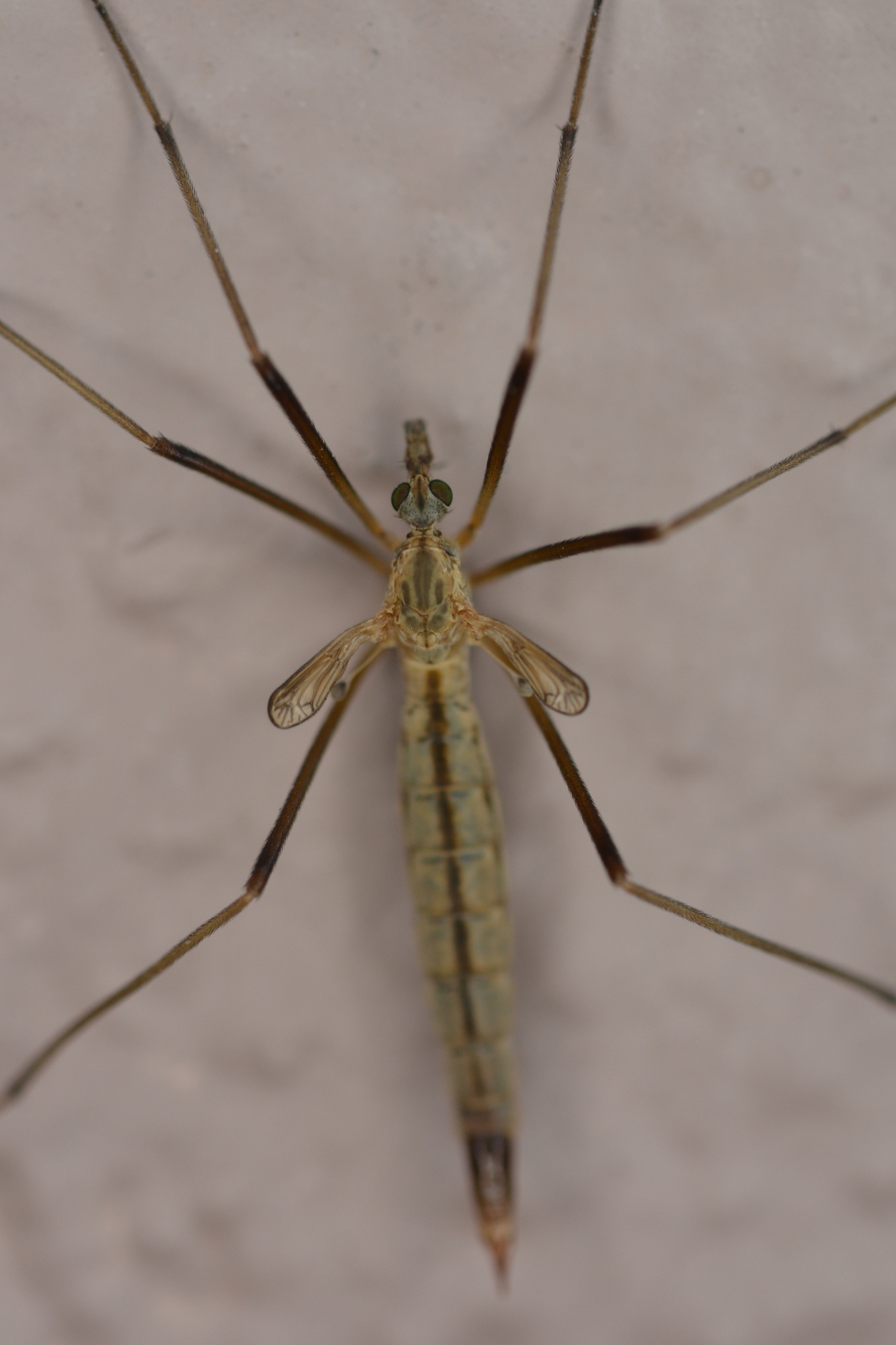
T. vestigipennis female specimen
