= Tipula duplex =

Scientific classification
- Kingdom: Animalia
- Phylum: Arthropoda
- Clade: Pancrustacea
- Class: Insecta
- Order: Diptera
- Family: Tipulidae
- Genus: Tipula
- Subgenus: Lunatipula
- Species: T. duplex

Binomial name
- Tipula duplex Walker, 1848

Synonyms
- Tipula cinctocornis Doane, 1901; Tipula mingwe Alexander, 1915

Species of fly

Tipula duplex is a species of large crane fly in the family Tipulidae.
