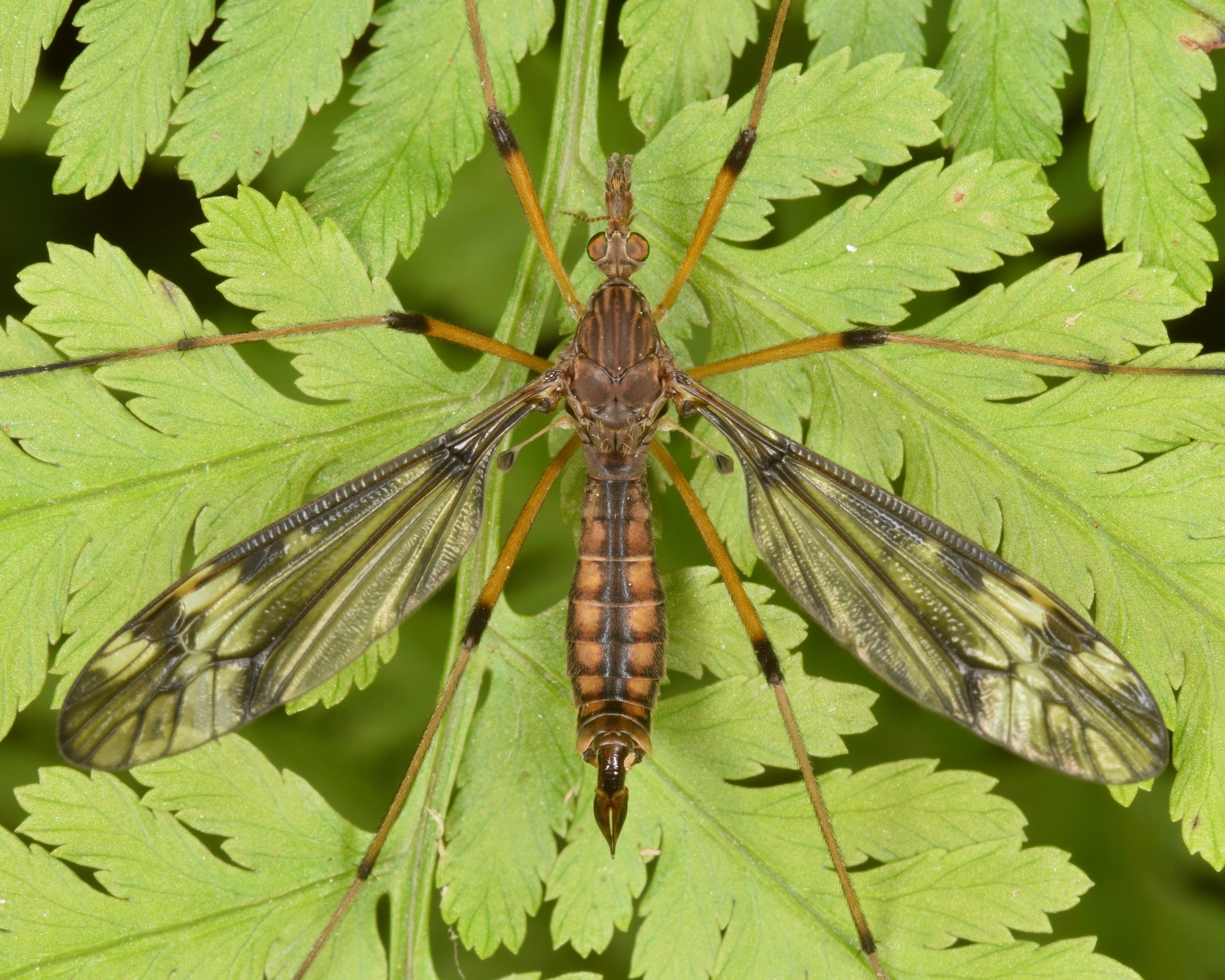

Scientific classification
- Kingdom: Animalia
- Phylum: Arthropoda
- Clade: Pancrustacea
- Class: Insecta
- Order: Diptera
- Family: Tipulidae
- Genus: Tipula
- Subgenus: Lunatipula
- Species: T. fuliginosa

Binomial name
- Tipula fuliginosa (Say, 1823)

Synonyms
- Ctenophora fuliginosa Say, 1823; Tipula speciosa Loew, 1863

= Tipula fuliginosa =

Species of fly

Tipula fuliginosa, the sooty crane fly, is a species of large crane fly in the family Tipulidae. It is found in Europe.
