= Tipula doaneiana =

Scientific classification
- Kingdom: Animalia
- Phylum: Arthropoda
- Clade: Pancrustacea
- Class: Insecta
- Order: Diptera
- Family: Tipulidae
- Genus: Tipula
- Subgenus: Triplicitipula
- Species: T. doaneiana

Binomial name
- Tipula doaneiana Alexander, 1919

Synonyms
- Tipula californica Doane, 1912

Species of fly

Tipula doaneiana is a species of large crane fly in the family Tipulidae, found in the United States.
