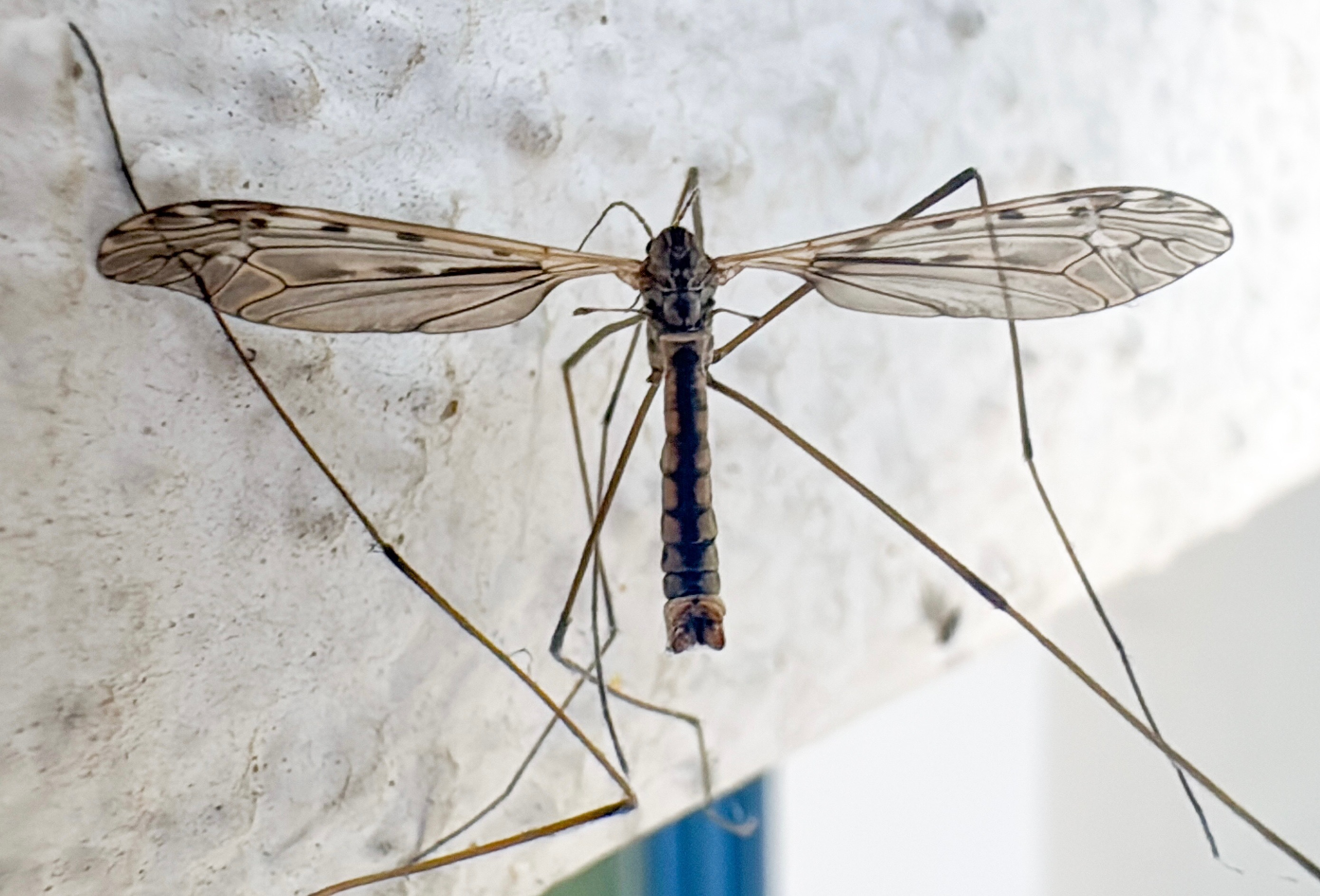
- Dead male specimen of Tipula simplex

Scientific classification
- Kingdom: Animalia
- Phylum: Arthropoda
- Clade: Pancrustacea
- Class: Insecta
- Order: Diptera
- Family: Tipulidae
- Genus: Tipula
- Subgenus: Triplicitipula
- Species: T. simplex

Binomial name
- Tipula simplex Doane, 1909

= Tipula simplex =

Species of crane fly

Tipula simplex, commonly known as the range crane fly, is a species of crane fly in the family Tipulidae, found in the western United States. It is arguably the most well-known/well-researched crane fly in Tipulidae.

== Description ==
The male has a wing length of 11–12 mm (0.43–0.47 in), whilst the female is essentially wingless, with wings greatly reduced and subequal in length to the halteres.

The wing pattern consists of dark brown spots along the costal and apical margins separated by about 2 mm.

== Habitat ==
The potential suitable habitats of T. simplex are unirrigated pastures of the Central Valley (California).

== Range ==
Tipula simplex has a known distribution in California, from Santa Cruz County north to Colusa County and east to Mariposa County. There are unconfirmed reports of T. simplex east of the Cascade Mountains in Oregon.

== Diet ==
Tipula simplex larvae feed on old cow manure, plant roots, and decaying matter. The feeding habits of adults are currently unknown along with all Tipulidae.

== Ecology ==
Larvae can cause adverse effects in the pastures they inhabit in high enough concenctrations. It has been observed, once every 6 years or so in Tulare County, that the numbers of larvae in an area can destroy all forage/fodder, make hills bare, and negatively affect the watershed.
