= Tipula monticola =

Scientific classification
- Kingdom: Animalia
- Phylum: Arthropoda
- Clade: Pancrustacea
- Class: Insecta
- Order: Diptera
- Family: Tipulidae
- Genus: Tipula
- Subgenus: Lunatipula
- Species: T. monticola

Binomial name
- Tipula monticola Alexander, 1915

Species of fly

Tipula monticola is a species in the family Tipulidae (crane flies), in the order Diptera (flies).
