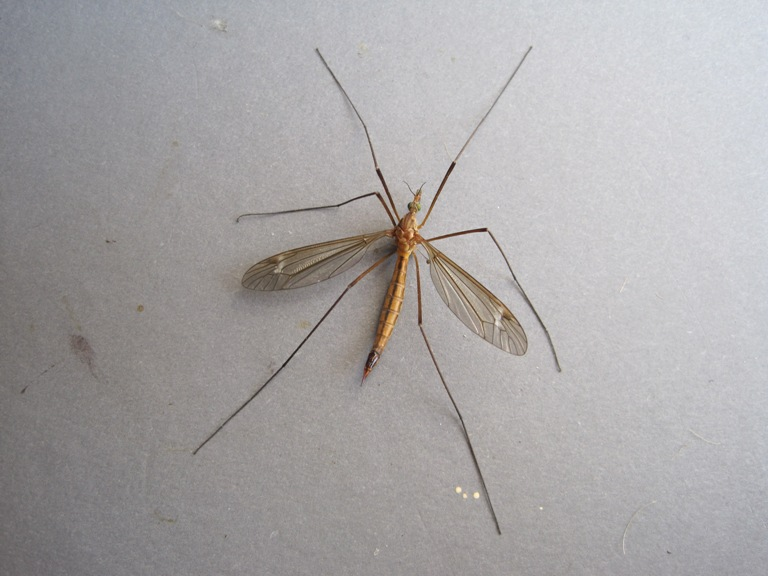
- Tipula cava Netherlands

Scientific classification
- Kingdom: Animalia
- Phylum: Arthropoda
- Clade: Pancrustacea
- Class: Insecta
- Order: Diptera
- Family: Tipulidae
- Genus: Tipula
- Subgenus: Lunatipula
- Species: T. cava

Binomial name
- Tipula cava Riedel, 1913

= Tipula cava =

Species of fly

Tipula cava is a species of fly in the family Tipulidae. It is found in the Palearctic.
