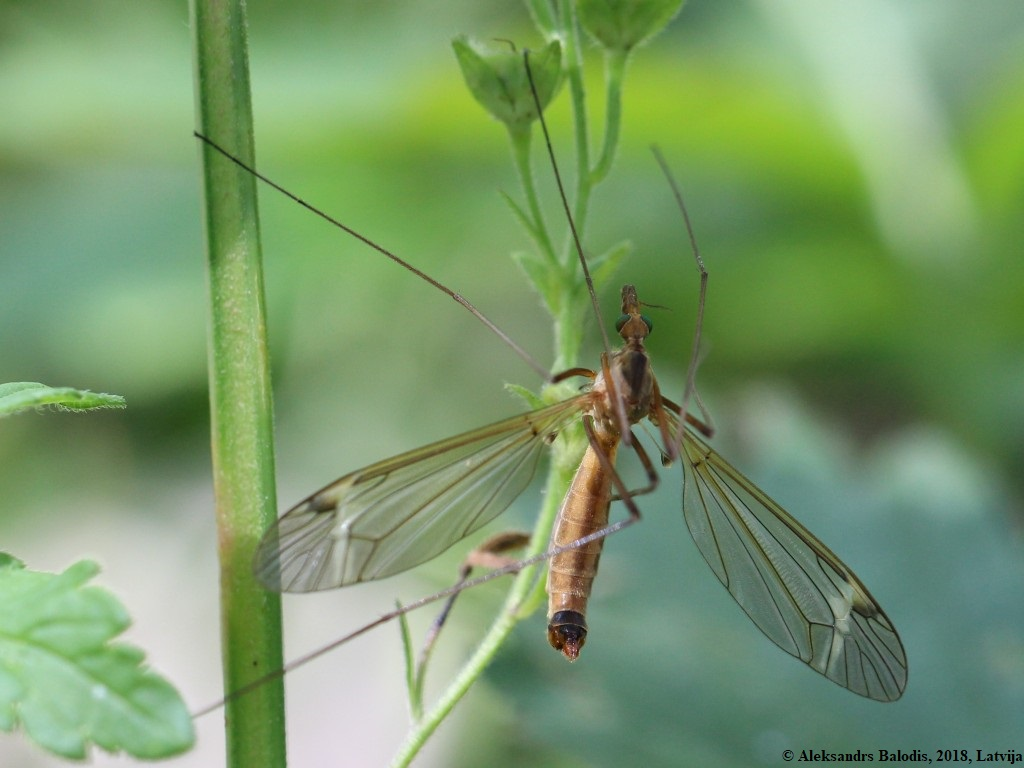
- Tipula fascipennis male

Scientific classification
- Kingdom: Animalia
- Phylum: Arthropoda
- Clade: Pancrustacea
- Class: Insecta
- Order: Diptera
- Family: Tipulidae
- Genus: Tipula
- Subgenus: Lunatipula
- Species: T. fascipennis

Binomial name
- Tipula fascipennis Meigen, 1818

= Tipula fascipennis =

Species of fly

Tipula fascipennis is a species of true craneflies.

== Distribution ==
Widespread throughout the West Palaearctic. Flies from May to August.

== Identification ==
See

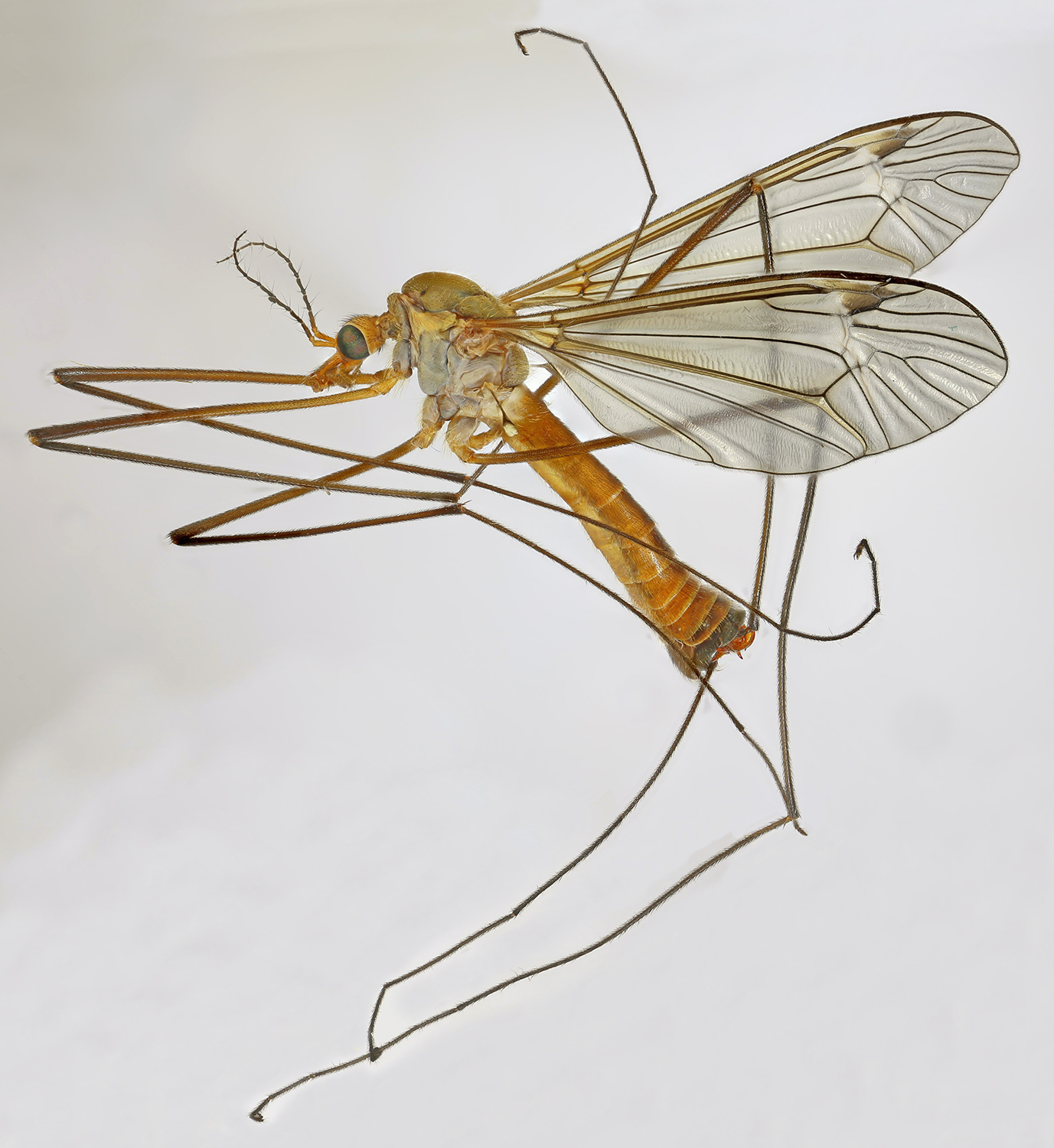

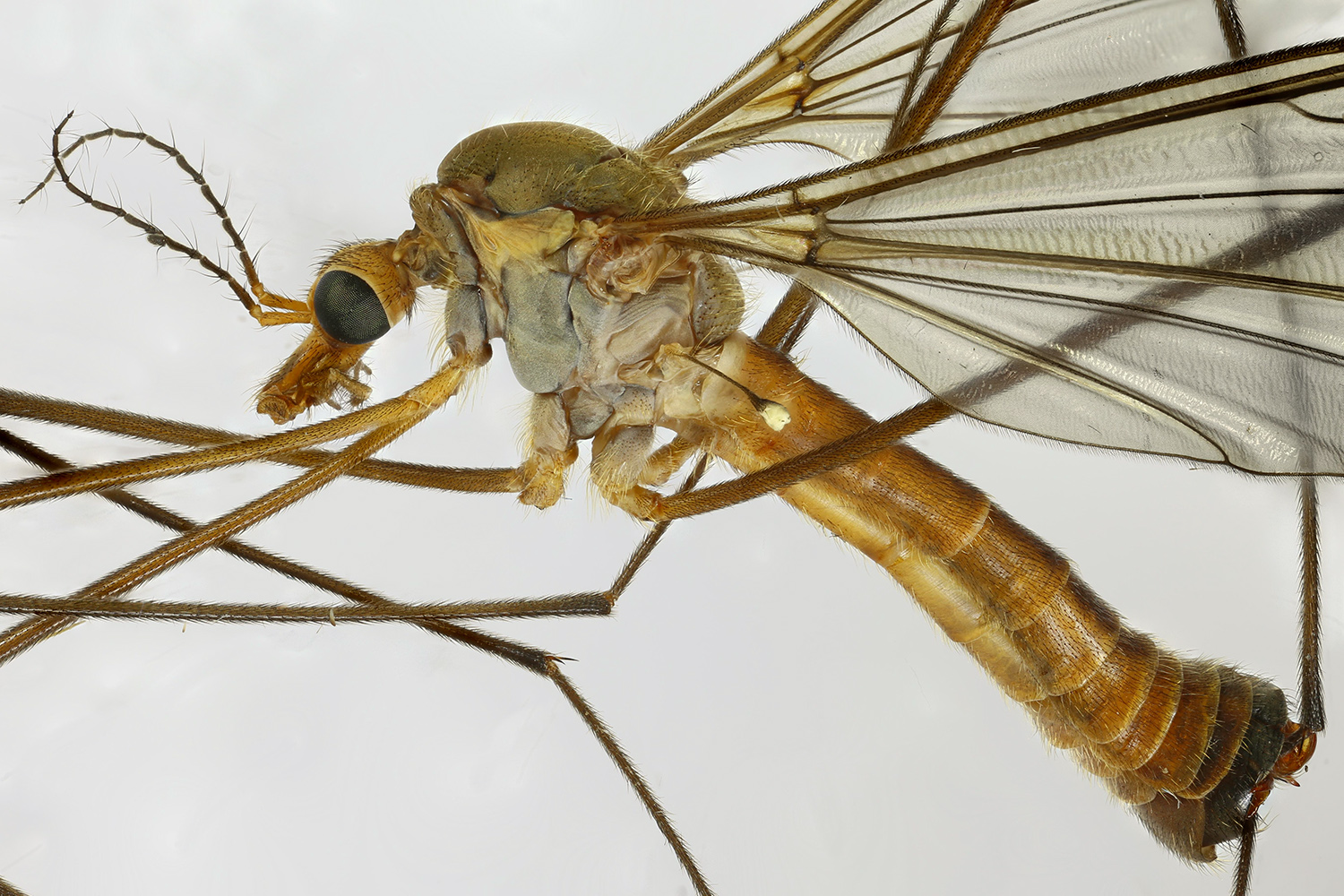
