= Tipula georgiana =

Scientific classification
- Kingdom: Animalia
- Phylum: Arthropoda
- Clade: Pancrustacea
- Class: Insecta
- Order: Diptera
- Family: Tipulidae
- Genus: Tipula
- Subgenus: Lunatipula
- Species: T. georgiana

Binomial name
- Tipula georgiana Alexander, 1915

Synonyms
- Tipula inornata Alexander, 1915

Species of fly

Tipula georgiana is a species of cranefly.

== Distribution ==
Eastern United States.
