= Tipula morrisoni =

Scientific classification
- Kingdom: Animalia
- Phylum: Arthropoda
- Clade: Pancrustacea
- Class: Insecta
- Order: Diptera
- Family: Tipulidae
- Genus: Tipula
- Subgenus: Lunatipula
- Species: T. morrisoni

Binomial name
- Tipula morrisoni Alexander, 1915

Species of fly

Tipula morrisoni is a species of large crane fly in the family Tipulidae.
