= Tipula silvestra =

Scientific classification
- Kingdom: Animalia
- Phylum: Arthropoda
- Clade: Pancrustacea
- Class: Insecta
- Order: Diptera
- Family: Tipulidae
- Genus: Tipula
- Subgenus: Triplicitipula
- Species: T. silvestra

Binomial name
- Tipula silvestra Doane, 1909

Species of fly

Tipula silvestra is a species of large crane fly in the family Tipulidae, found in the western United States.
