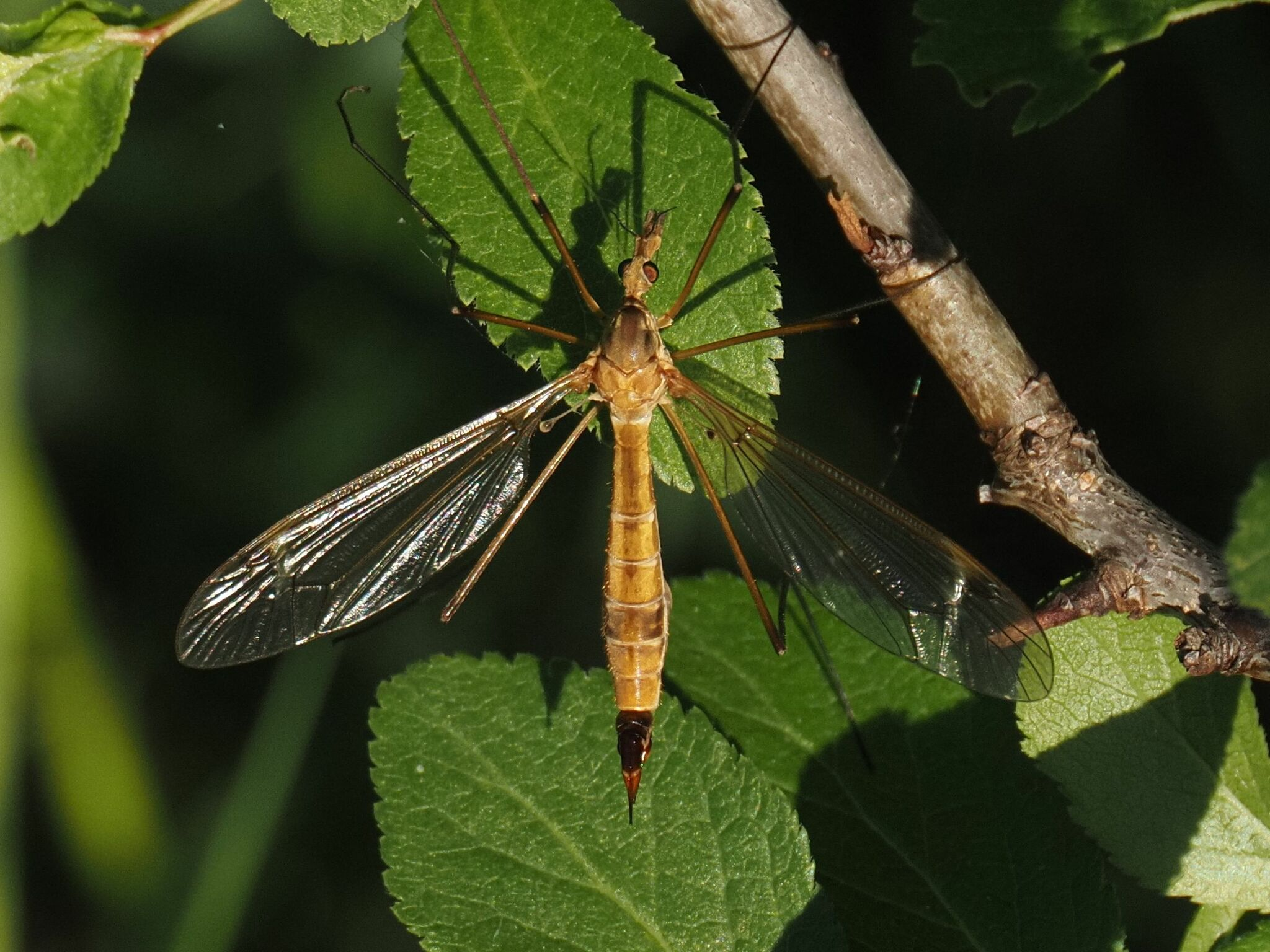

Scientific classification
- Kingdom: Animalia
- Phylum: Arthropoda
- Clade: Pancrustacea
- Class: Insecta
- Order: Diptera
- Family: Tipulidae
- Genus: Tipula
- Subgenus: Lunatipula
- Species: T. lunata

Binomial name
- Tipula lunata Linnaeus, 1758

Synonyms
- Tipula ochracea Meigen, 1804; Tipula polypogon Alexander, 1934

= Tipula lunata =

Species of fly

Tipula lunata is a species of cranefly which is widespread throughout the Palaearctic. It is commonly known as the lunate cranefly.
