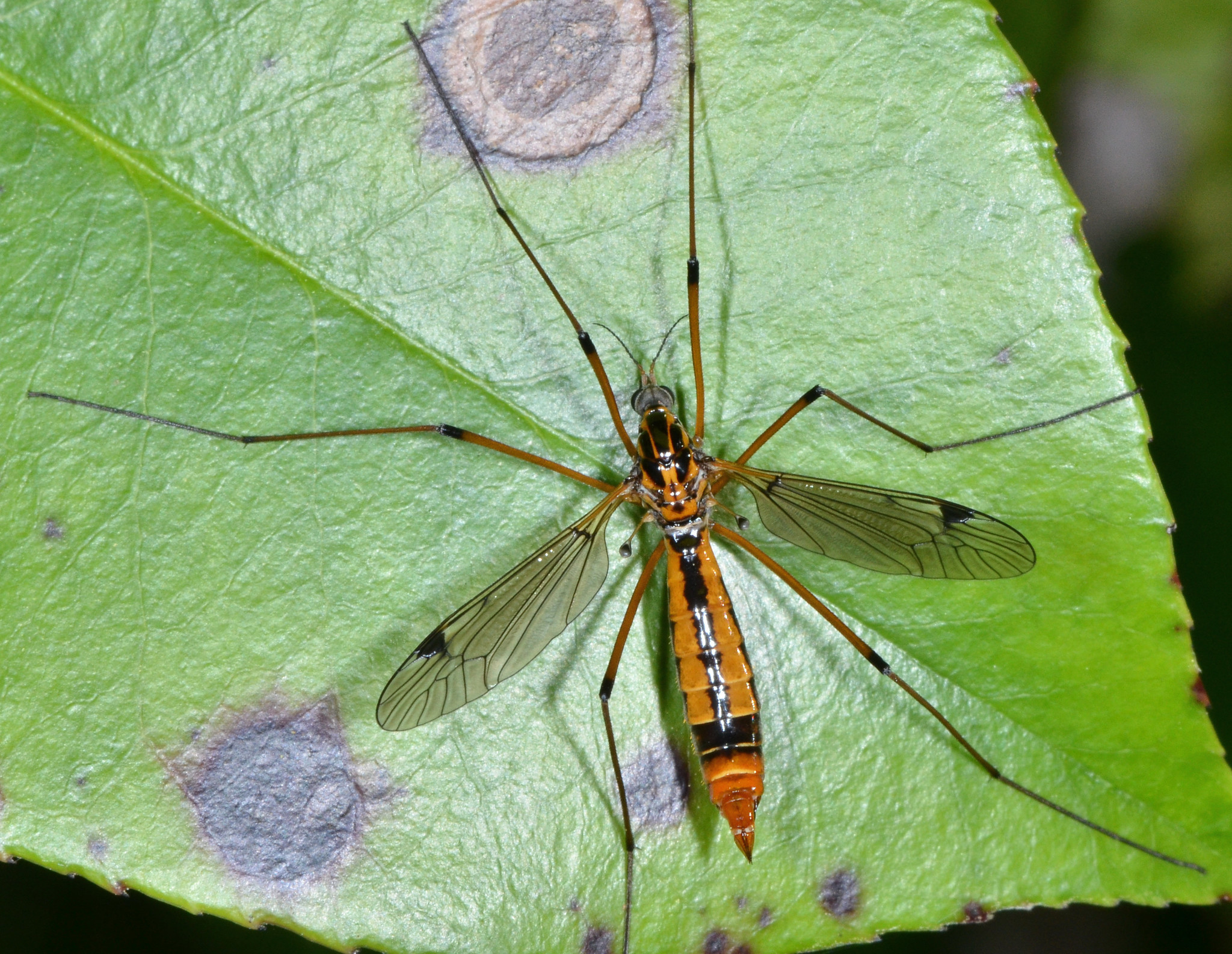
- Tipula californica

Scientific classification
- Kingdom: Animalia
- Phylum: Arthropoda
- Clade: Pancrustacea
- Class: Insecta
- Order: Diptera
- Family: Tipulidae
- Genus: Tipula
- Subgenus: Hesperotipula (Alexander, 1947)

Type species
- Tipula streptocera Doane, 1901

= Tipula (Hesperotipula) =

Subgenus of crane fly

Hesperotipula is a subgenus of the crane fly genus Tipula that is present on the west coast of the North American continent.

== Species ==
See list of Hesperotipula species.

== Description ==
Members of Hesperotipula resemble another Tipula subgenus, Lunatipula, except for their differing genitalia.

== Distribution ==
Hesperotipula species are present in Vancouver and California.
