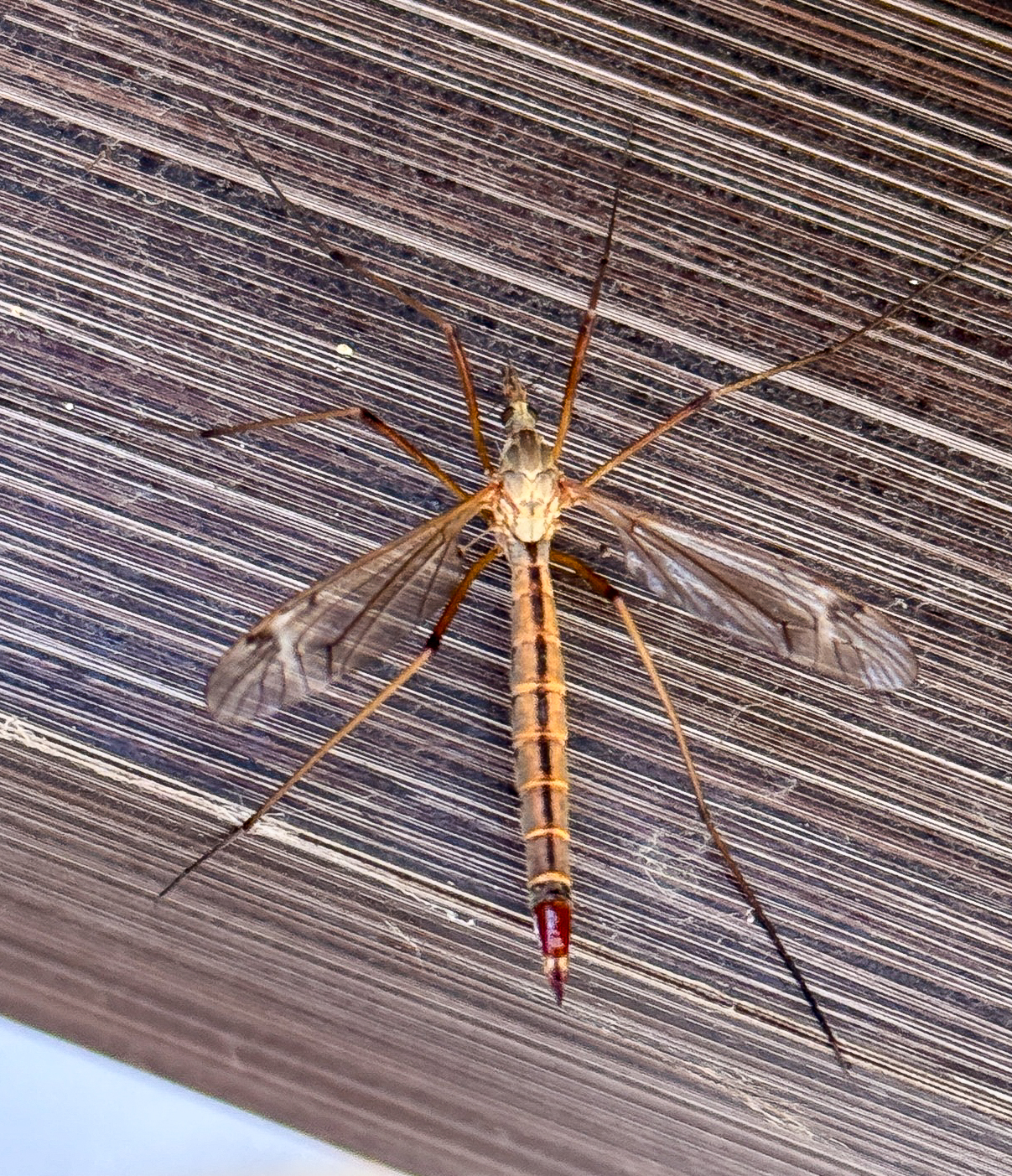
- Female Tipula acuta

Scientific classification
- Kingdom: Animalia
- Phylum: Arthropoda
- Clade: Pancrustacea
- Class: Insecta
- Order: Diptera
- Family: Tipulidae
- Genus: Tipula
- Subgenus: Triplicitipula; Alexander, 1965

Species
- Tipula acuta Doane, 1901; Tipula aequalis Doane, 1901; Tipula barnesiana Alexander, 1963; Tipula bellmyi Alexander, 1965; Tipula colei; Tipula doaneiana Alexander, 1919; Tipula flavoumbrosa; Tipula hoogstraali; Tipula idiotricha Alexander, 1965; Tipula integra Alexander, 1962; Tipula justa Alexander, 1935; Tipula lygropis Alexander, 1920; Tipula minensis Alexander, 1936; Tipula nastjasta Yang & Yang, 1991; Tipula occidentalis Doane, 1912; Tipula perlongipes; Tipula planicornis Doane, 1912; Tipula praecisa Loew, 1872; Tipula pubera Loew, 1864; Tipula quaylii Doane, 1909; Tipula sanctaeritae Alexander, 1946; Tipula silvestra Doane, 1909; Tipula simplex Doane, 1909; Tipula subtilis Doane, 1901; Tipula sylvicola Doane, 1912; Tipula triplex Walker, 1848; Tipula umbrosa Loew, 1863; Tipula variipetiolaris Alexander, 1933; Tipula vestigipennis Doane, 1908; Tipula williamsi Doane, 1909

= Tipula (Triplicitipula) =

Subgenus of crane fly

Triplicitipula is a subgenus of crane fly in the family Tipulidae, found in the lower half of North America. Several of the Californian species have reduced wings, most commonly found in females with some species (e.g. T. quaylii) possessing this trait in both sexes.

== Distribution and habitat ==
Triplicitipula contains numerous species across North America with many in California having a variety of habitats. There are a few species that inhabit the high mountains of western China and Tibet.
