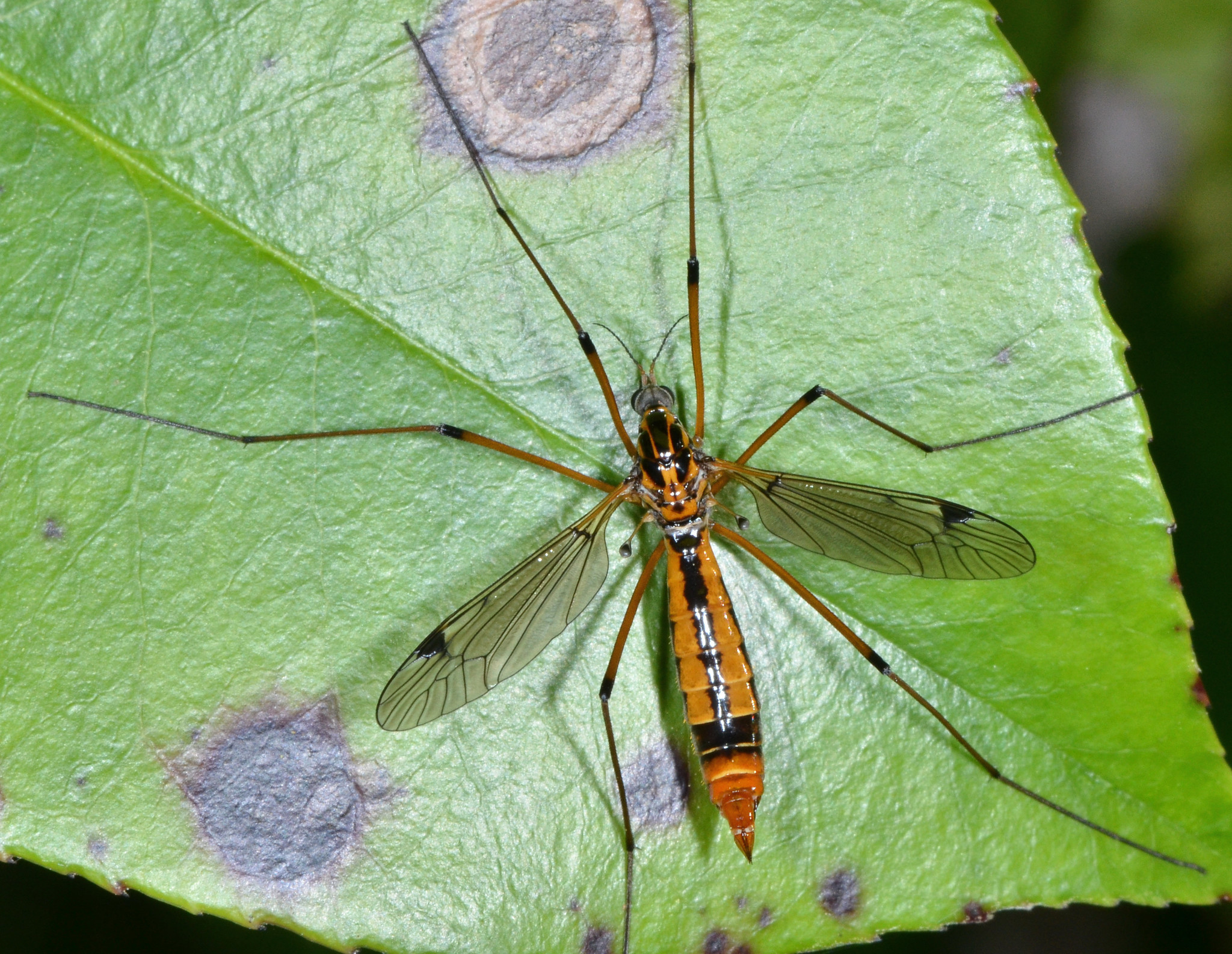

Scientific classification
- Kingdom: Animalia
- Phylum: Arthropoda
- Clade: Pancrustacea
- Class: Insecta
- Order: Diptera
- Family: Tipulidae
- Genus: Tipula
- Subgenus: Hesperotipula
- Species: T. californica

Binomial name
- Tipula californica (Doane, 1908)

= Tipula californica =

Species of insect

Tipula californica is a species of insect from the subgenus Hesperotipula.
