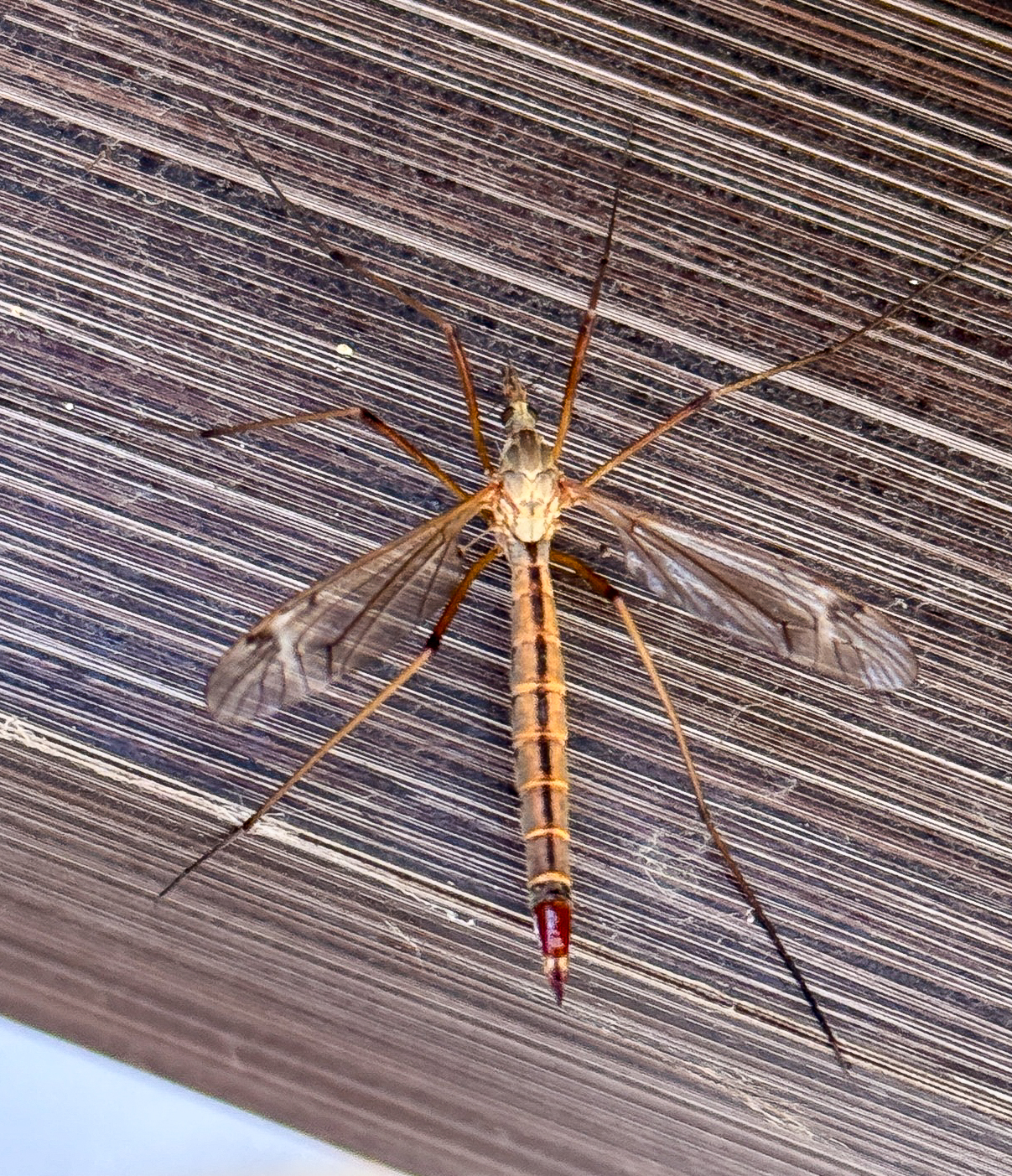
- Female Tipula acuta specimen found in Solano County

Scientific classification
- Kingdom: Animalia
- Phylum: Arthropoda
- Clade: Pancrustacea
- Class: Insecta
- Order: Diptera
- Family: Tipulidae
- Genus: Tipula
- Subgenus: Triplicitipula
- Species: T. acuta

Binomial name
- Tipula acuta Alexander, 1901

= Tipula acuta =

Species of fly

Tipula acuta is a species of crane fly in the family Tipulidae found in the western United States.

== Range ==
Tipula acuta is found in most of California except for the extreme south.
