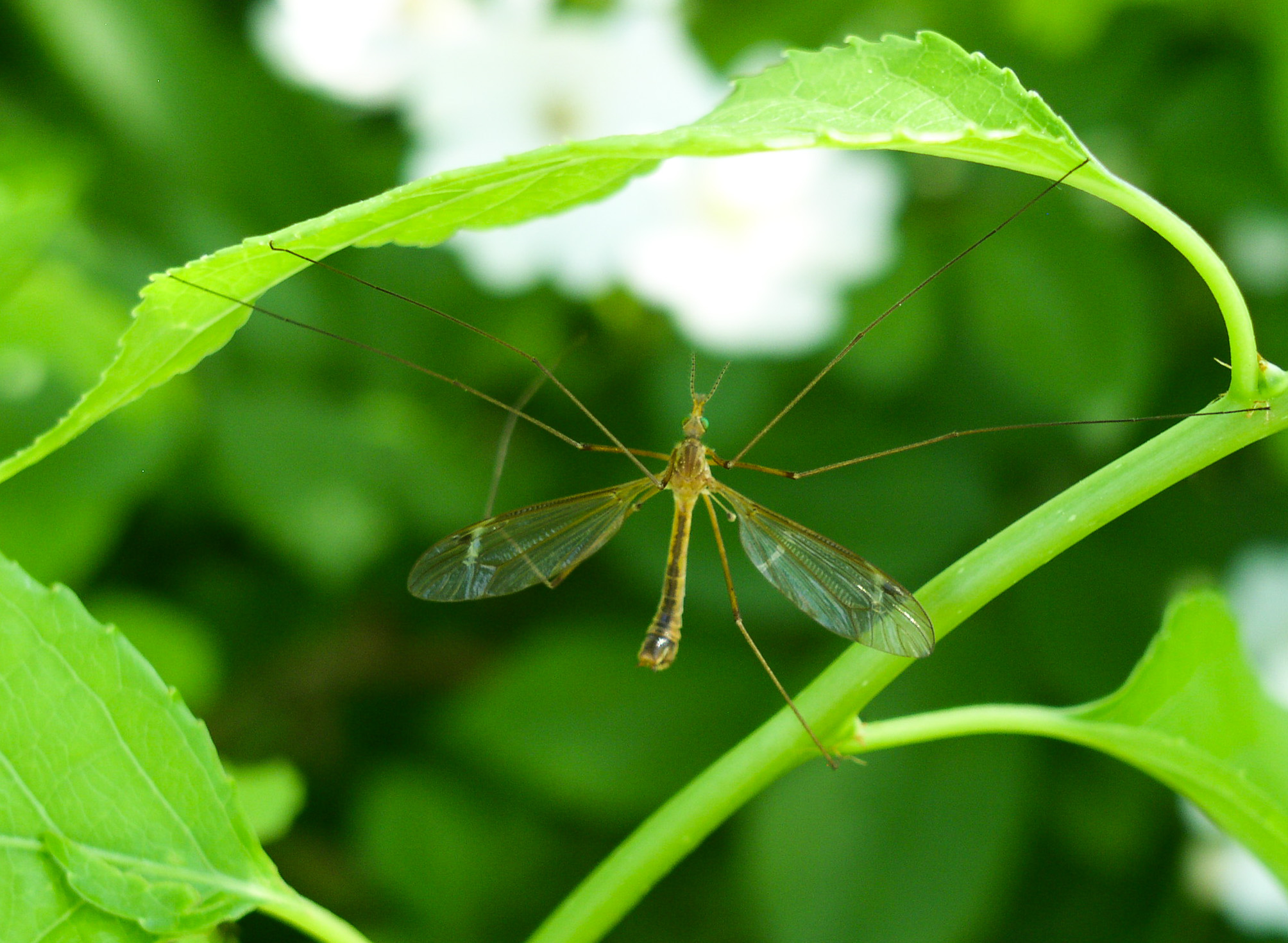
- Male

Scientific classification
- Kingdom: Animalia
- Phylum: Arthropoda
- Clade: Pancrustacea
- Class: Insecta
- Order: Diptera
- Family: Tipulidae
- Genus: Tipula
- Subgenus: Lunatipula
- Species: T. bicornis

Binomial name
- Tipula bicornis Forbes, 1890

= Tipula bicornis =

Species of fly

Tipula bicornis is a species of large crane fly in the family Tipulidae.
