= Tipula praecisa =

Scientific classification
- Kingdom: Animalia
- Phylum: Arthropoda
- Clade: Pancrustacea
- Class: Insecta
- Order: Diptera
- Family: Tipulidae
- Genus: Tipula
- Subgenus: Triplicitipula
- Species: T. praecisa

Binomial name
- Tipula praecisa Loew, 1872

Species of fly

Tipula praecisa is a species of crane fly in the family Tipulidae, found in the western United States.

== Range ==
Tipula praecisa is located within the states of California, Oregon, and Washington.

== Description ==
The following is an excerpt from Diptera: Americae Sepentrionalis Indigena by Hermann Loew where Tipula praecisa is first described. A translated version would be appreciated.
