= Tipula pubera =

Scientific classification
- Kingdom: Animalia
- Phylum: Arthropoda
- Clade: Pancrustacea
- Class: Insecta
- Order: Diptera
- Family: Tipulidae
- Genus: Tipula
- Subgenus: Triplicitipula
- Species: T. pubera

Binomial name
- Tipula pubera Loew, 1864

Species of fly

Tipula pubera is a species of large crane fly in the family Tipulidae, found in British Columbia south to California (including the Channel Islands).

== Description ==
The following is a translated excerpt from Diptera: Americae Sepentrionalis Indigena by Hermann Loew where Tipula pubera was first described (may have inaccuracies in translation). The original text can be referenced below it.

"Tipula pubera. Teslacea is covered with hairs that are slightly darker than the hairs of the hair, and the body is covered with longer hairs. The antennae of the antennae are brownish-black; the wings are spotted, the posterior umbilicus is atbido-marginal, the second longidinal vein is shortened by the anterior branch. — Long. corp. 9 lin., Long. al. 10 lin. From yellow leslacea or ochbracea, dark, with longer hairs, in top, rostrum and palps black, on the rest of the body pale veslita. The whole head is colored, with a brown arlic and an anlennar flagellum on each of the palps, but the first with a lighter arlic of the two. The body of the lboraris is smaller, but a little more salinary. Sculelliim and mclanolnm immaculate. Abdomen with a trace of dark subfusca lines and a faint subfusca line on the utrinqiie. Hypopygium very large, concolorous, with large inner lamellae. On the apical margin with very dense hairs, the feet are subfusca, the femurs with apices of the tibiae and all the tarsals with black-fusca claws. Wings of dark grey, pale, secondary veins with short anterior margin; major dark vein absent in basal cells; stigma dark; base of secondary vein, transverse veins, fifth longitudinal vein, and tips of remaining veins dark-marginate; posterior cells whitish marginate; axillary cells with prominent white margin and white stripe." (P. 219, Loew)

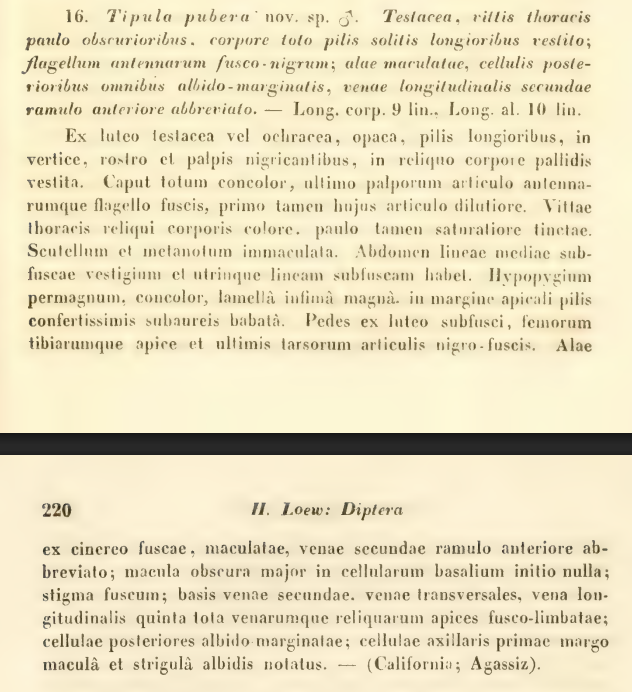
Untranslated version

== Ecology ==
As with all Triplicitipula, T. pubera is considered a pest. It is destructive to vegetation and crops.

== Taxonomy ==
Tipula pubera was first described by Hermann Loew in 1864 in Diptera: Americae Sepentrionalis Indigena: Centuria Quinta.
