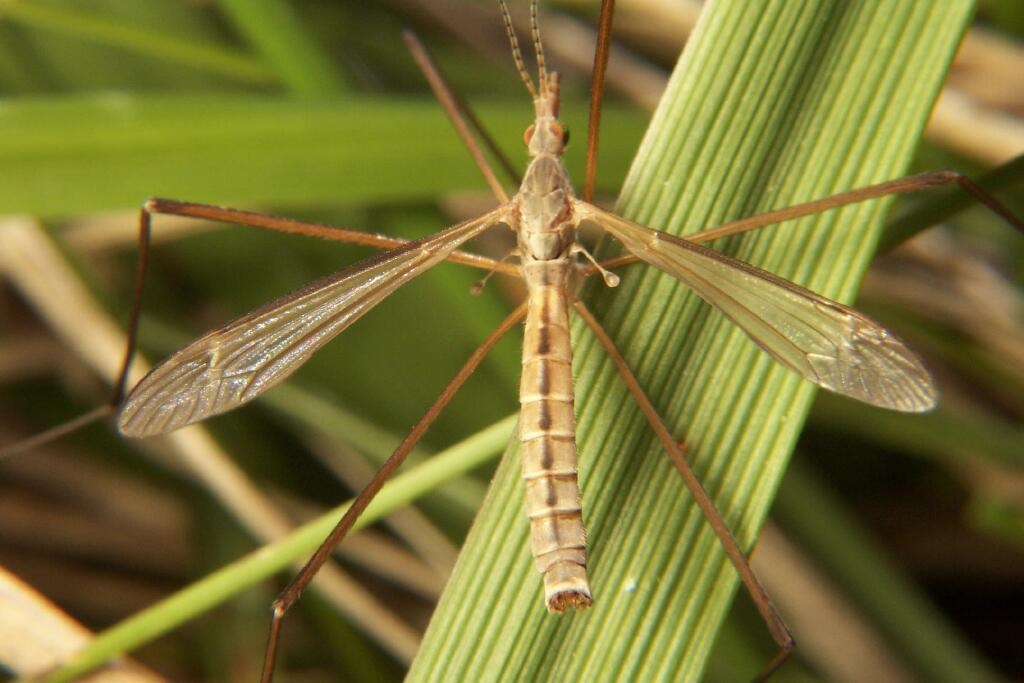

Scientific classification
- Kingdom: Animalia
- Phylum: Arthropoda
- Clade: Pancrustacea
- Class: Insecta
- Order: Diptera
- Family: Tipulidae
- Genus: Tipula
- Subgenus: Platytipula
- Species: T. paterifera

Binomial name
- Tipula paterifera Alexander, 1962

= Tipula paterifera =

Species of fly

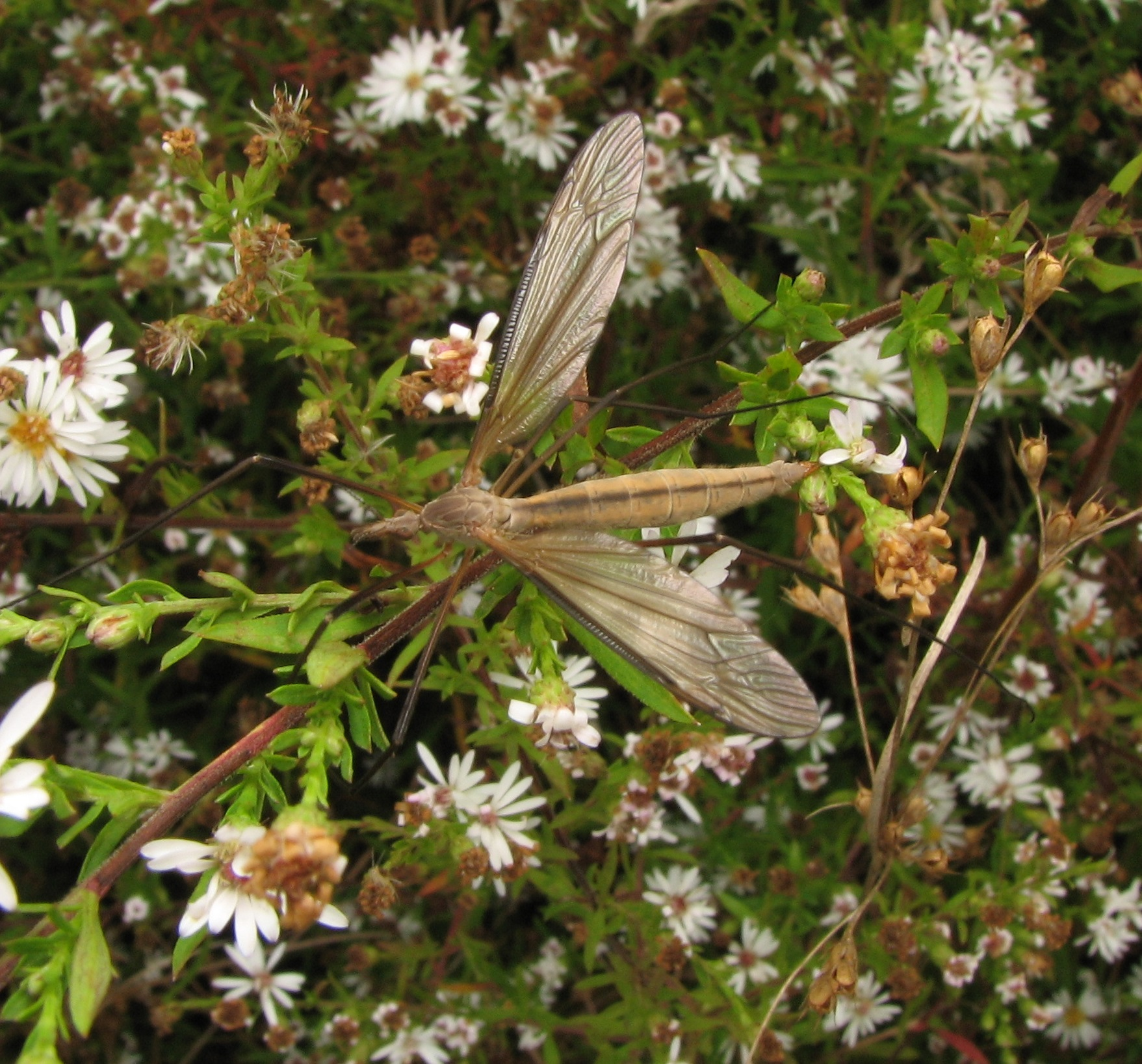
T. paterifera

Tipula paterifera is a species of large crane fly in the family Tipulidae, found in the central and eastern United States.
