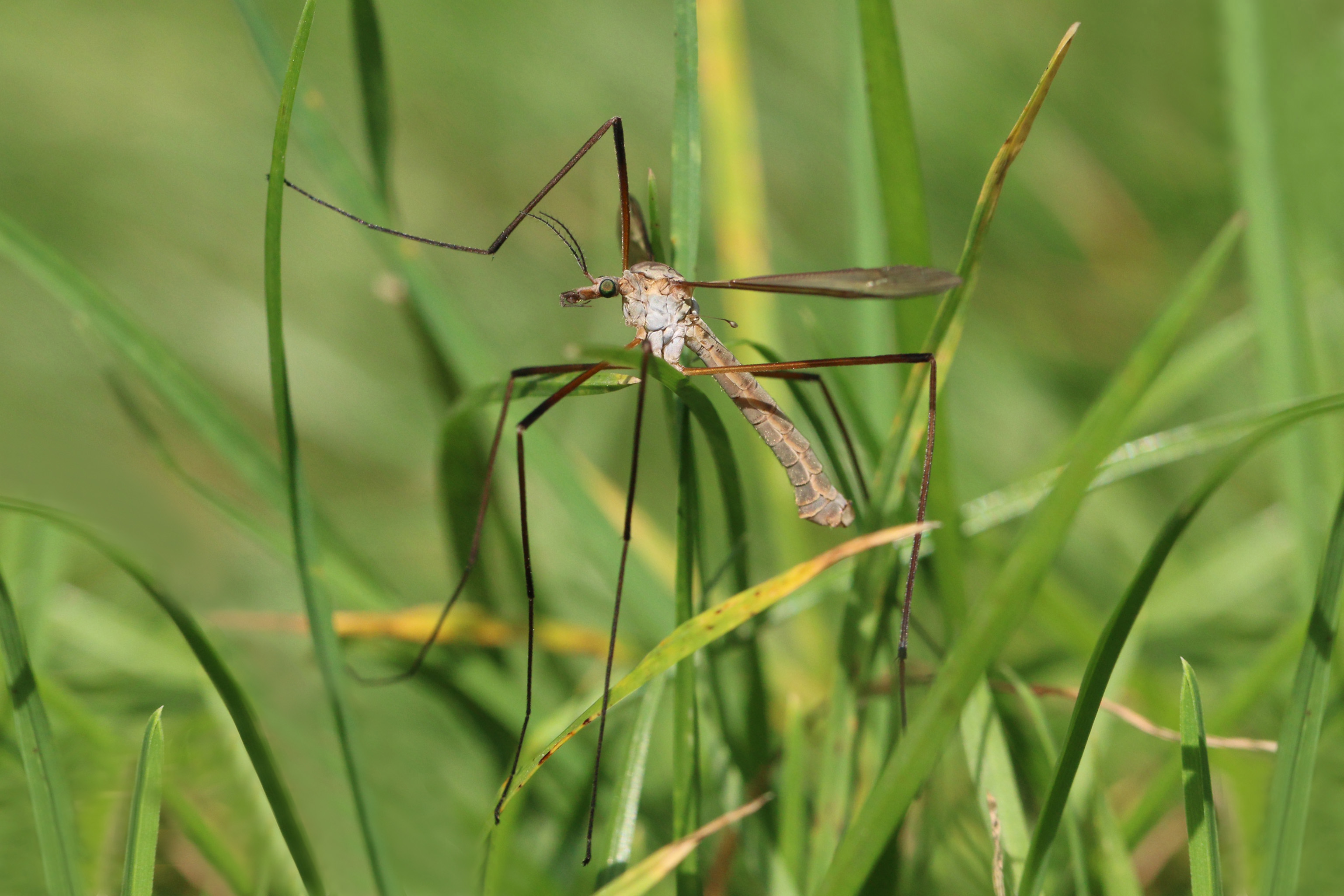

Scientific classification
- Kingdom: Animalia
- Phylum: Arthropoda
- Clade: Pancrustacea
- Class: Insecta
- Order: Diptera
- Family: Tipulidae
- Genus: Tipula
- Subgenus: Tipula
- Species: T. oleracea

Binomial name
- Tipula oleracea Linnaeus, 1758

Synonyms
- Tipula pratensis De Geer, 1776; Tipula submendosa Tjeder, 1941

= Tipula oleracea =

Species of cranefly

The marsh crane fly (Tipula oleracea) is a species of cranefly found throughout the Palaearctic and parts of the Nearctic. Its specific name oleracea means "related to vegetables/herbs" in Latin and is a form of holeraceus (oleraceus).

== Technical description ==
A usually greyish species, but abdomen occasionally ferruginous and often with a blackish median and/or lateral longitudinal stripe. The wing length is 18–28 mm. The minimum space between eyes below is at most subequal to the maximum width of antennal scape; the antennae are 13-segmented. The male tergite 9 has a short median projection (its breadth at base exceeding its length), and roundly bifurcated at apex, the bifurcations blackish; sternite 8 simple, 9 almost fused with tergite 9 (as in T. paludosa and T. czizeki). female wings as long as abdomen; sternal valves usually extending to about two-thirds length of cerci, cerci only slightly clubbed at tips.

== Distribution ==
Tipula oleracea is prevalent mainly in Europe. Their habitat ranges in the South to North Africa, but has a limit in Algeria to the East. In Europe the South-eastern boundary is in Greece. It occurs on some Greek islands such as Crete as a subspecies and is also on Malta. It is found in Northern Europe with the exception of Finland and Latvia.

In North and South America, it was probably introduced as an invasive species located in the West of the North American continent from British Columbia to California, in the East between Michigan and New York. It was introduced in Ecuador in South America.

== Biology ==
Tipula oleracea flies in early summer from April to June, (peak May–June) and there is a second generation in the late summer from August to October. Small swarms, which probably serve as pairing formations are formed in the evening hours when they fly close to the ground over meadows and fields.

Eggs are laid individually into loose, moist soil. Wet meadows offer this possibility, but also gardens and cultural areas are ideal for egg-laying. As a female can lay eggs up to 1200 and often up to 400 larvae may live in a square metre, mass attacks can damage crops. The eggs are oval and slightly less than one millimeter in size. They have a dark colour. The larvae hatch after about 15 days. The larvae are brownish and the first instar is three to four millimeters long.

The larvae feed on decaying vegetable matter, but also on delicate roots and can cause damage in crops like cabbage. At night, they can affect the above ground parts of the plants and eat the leaves. The larval development takes around four months and includes four moults. The larva is several centimeters long and pupates in the soil. The second generation spends the winter in the ground until late spring or early summer.

The adult animals can take only liquid food like nectar due to its soft mouthparts. The entire life cycle of T. oleracea is up to eight months.

== Gallery ==
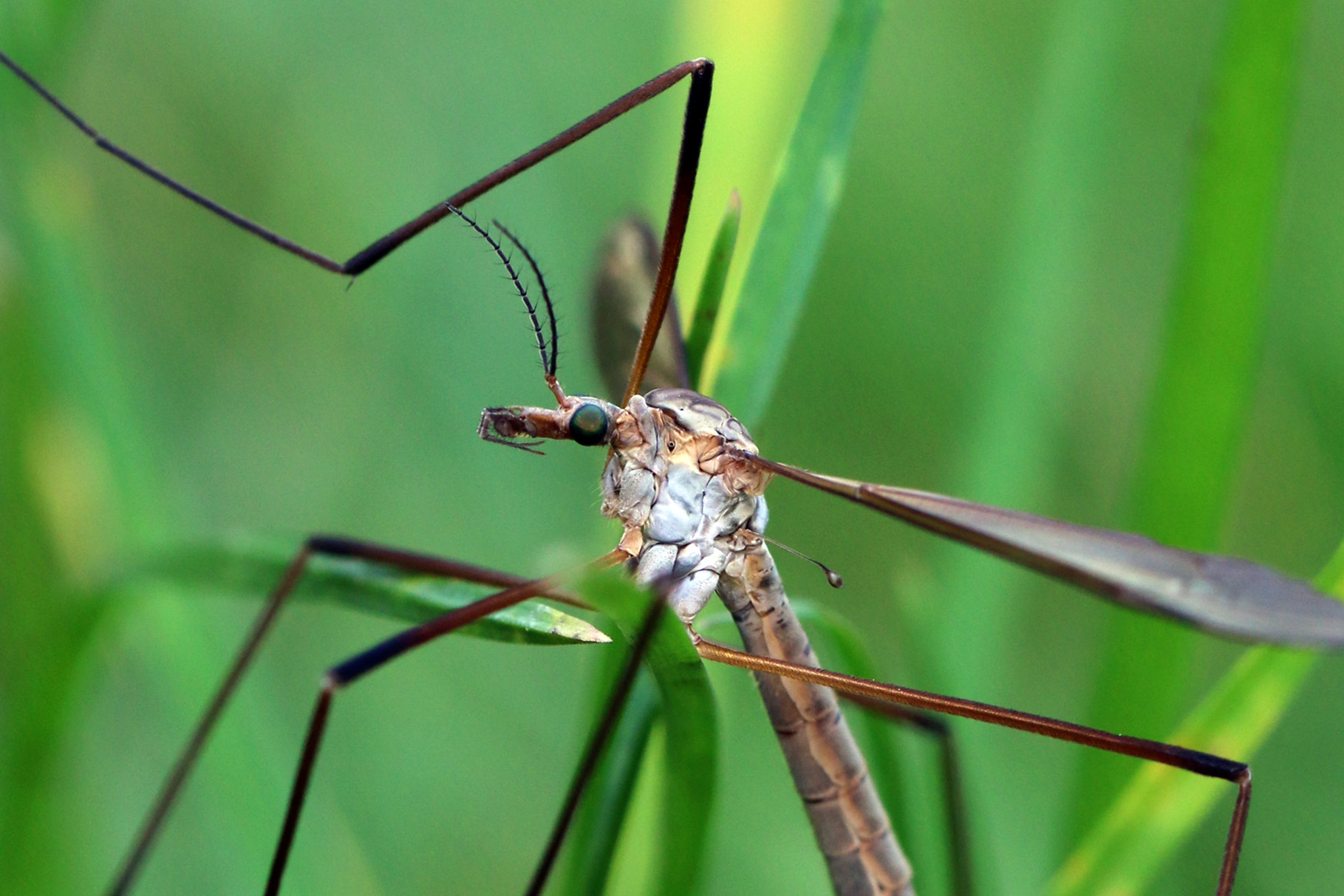
Head

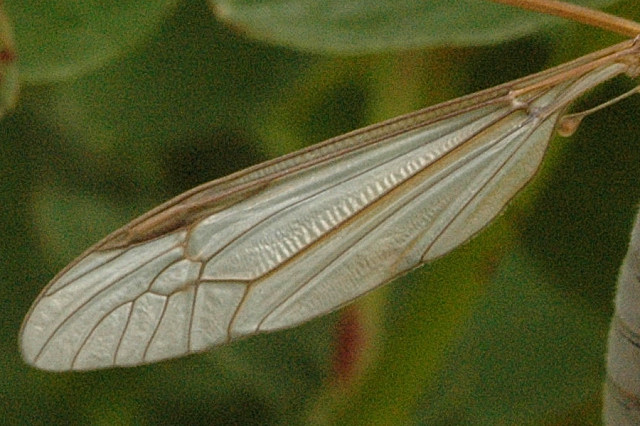
Wing detail

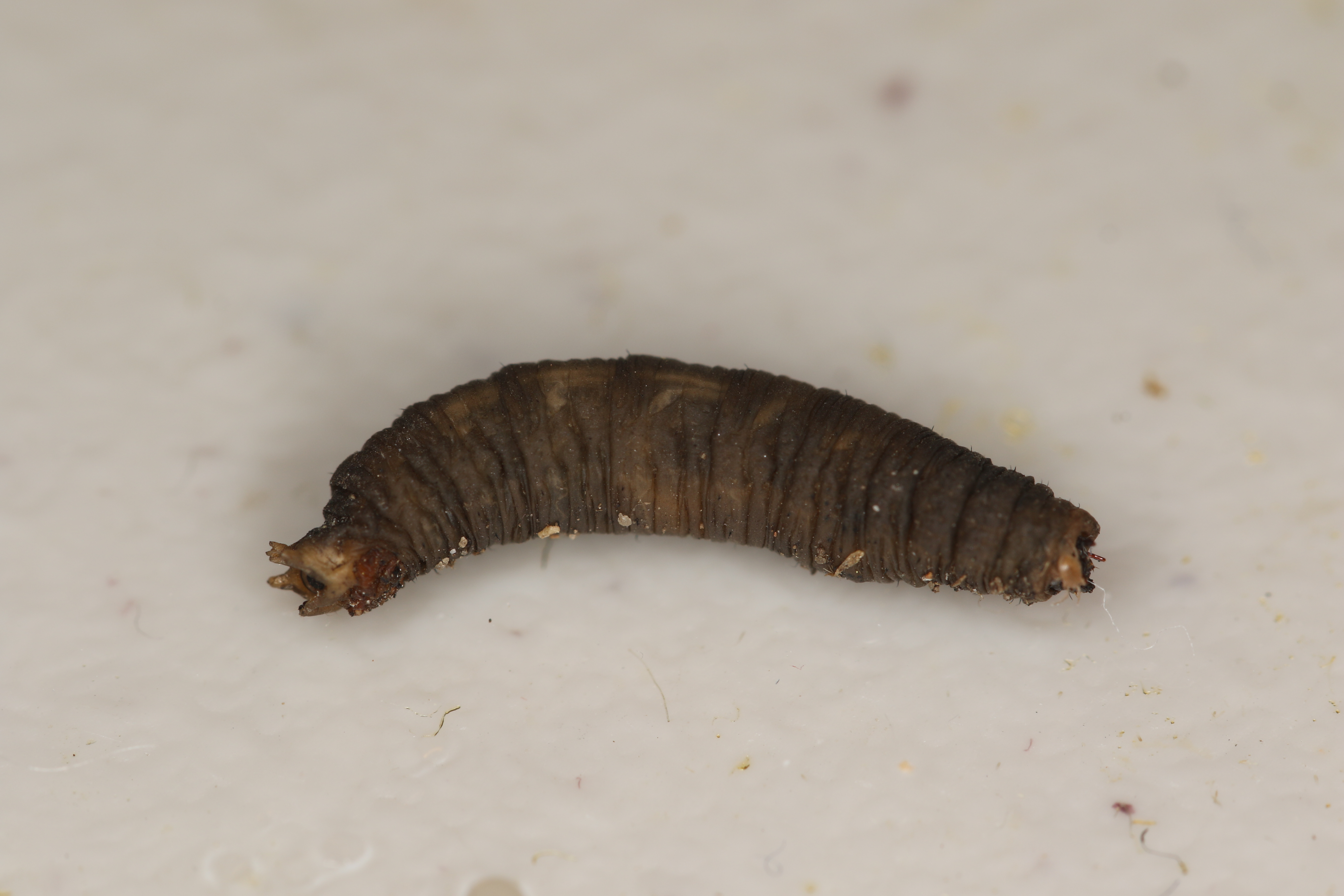
Larva
