= Evgeniy Nikolaevich Savchenko =

Ukrainian entomologist (1909–1994)

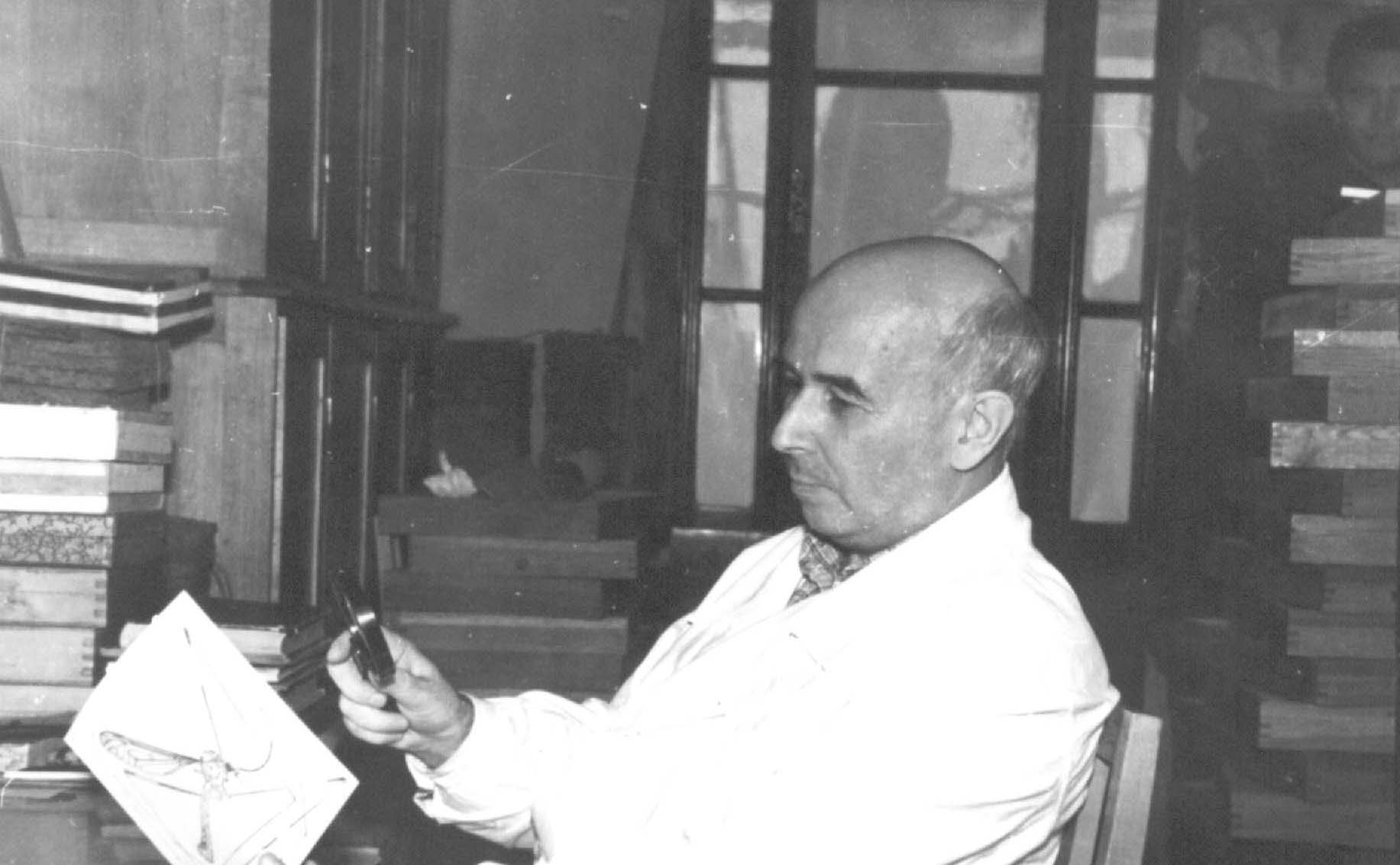
- Savchenko in the laboratory of The Institute of Zoology (Kyiv, 1971)
- Born: Євген Миколайович Савченко; 12 July 1909; Ukraine
- Died: 9 January 1994 (aged 84); Kyiv, Ukraine
- Resting place: Ashes spread in the floodplain of the Irpin River
- Education: Taras Shevchenko National University of Kyiv
- Spouse: Mokrzhitskaya Evgeniya Nikolaevna
- Scientific career
- Fields: Entomology
- Workplaces: National Museum of Natural History at the National Academy of Sciences of Ukraine; I. I. Schmalhausen Institute of Zoology; Institute of Plant Protection of the National Academy of Agrarian Sciences of Ukraine; All-Union Scientific Research Institute of Sugar Beets; Institute of Plant Protection (ended circa 1943)

Evgeniy Nikolaevich Savchenko (12 July 1909 – 9 January 1994) was a Ukrainian entomologist known for his work on Tipulomorpha, Coleoptera, and agricultural pest control. Most of his work was in Palearctic Tipuloidea. He described 435 tipuloid taxa in his lifetime. The limoniid fly Cheilotrichia savchenkoi, described in 2015, was named in his honour.
