= Rennie Wilbur Doane =

American entomologist and zoologist

- Born: March 11, 1871; Des Moines, Iowa
- Died: December 1, 1942 (aged 71)
- Education: Stanford University
- Occupations: entomologist and zoologist
- Employer: Stanford University
- Known for: study of insects
- Notable work: books:Common Pests, Elementary Textbook of Economic Zoology and Entomology, Forest Insects

Rennie Wilbur Doane (March 11, 1871 – December 1, 1942), was an American entomologist and zoologist who taught at Stanford University from 1906 to 1937. He studied the taxonomy of dipterans (flies) and wrote several textbooks on insects and economic entomology.

Doane was born in Des Moines, Iowa, and grew up in Kansas and Southern California. He entered Stanford University in 1891, graduating with a bachelor's degree in zoology and entomology. He taught zoology and entomology at Washington State College from 1896 to 1901, and was superintendent of the Fisheries Experimental Station in Keyport, Washington, from 1901 to 1903, working mainly in oyster cultivation. He joined the faculty of Stanford in 1906 as instructor, becoming associate professor in 1920 and full professor in 1926. He studied the taxonomy of flies, especially crane flies, of which he described over 150 species.

== Books ==
- Insects and Disease. 1910.
- With Vernon Lyman Kellogg: Elementary Textbook of Economic Zoology and Entomology. New York: H. Holt and Company. 1915.
- Common Pests. 1931.
- With Edwin Cooper Van Dyke, Willard Joseph Chamberlin, and Harry Eugene Burke: Forest Insects. New York: McGraw-Hill Book Company. 1936.
