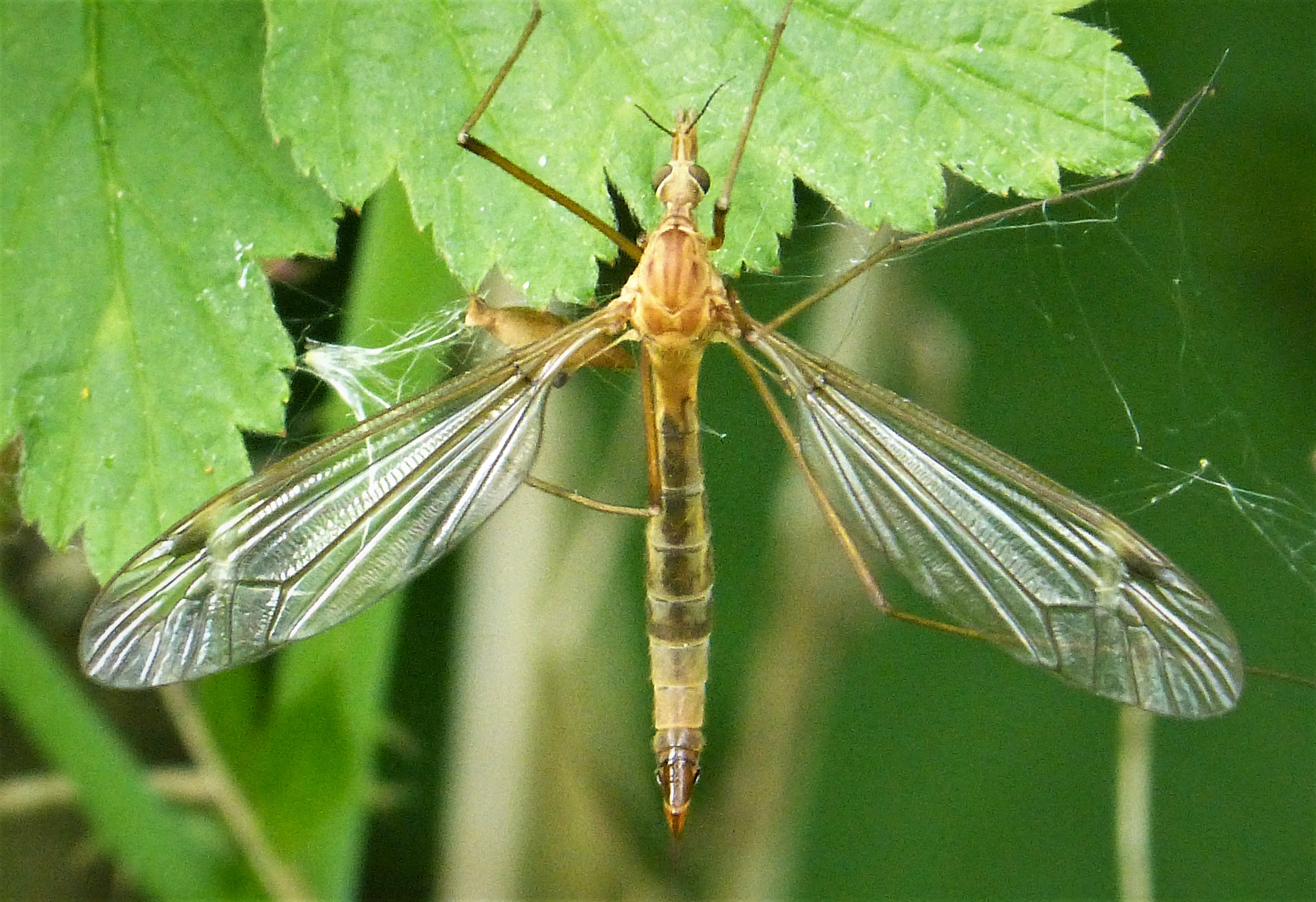
- Tipula lunata female

Scientific classification
- Kingdom: Animalia
- Phylum: Arthropoda
- Clade: Pancrustacea
- Class: Insecta
- Order: Diptera
- Family: Tipulidae
- Genus: Tipula
- Subgenus: Lunatipula (Edwards, 1931)

Type species
- Tipula lunata (Linnaeus, 1758)

= Tipula (Lunatipula) =

Subgenus of crane fly

Lunatipula is a subgenus of crane flies in the genus Tipula. It is found on the continents of North America, Europe, Africa, and Asia.

== Species ==
See list of Lunatipula species.
