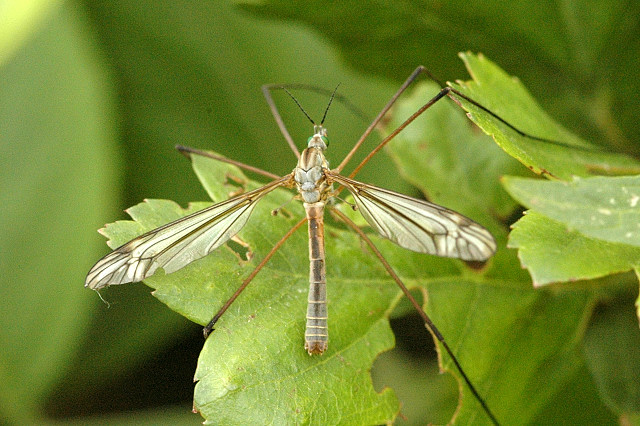
- Tipula luna male
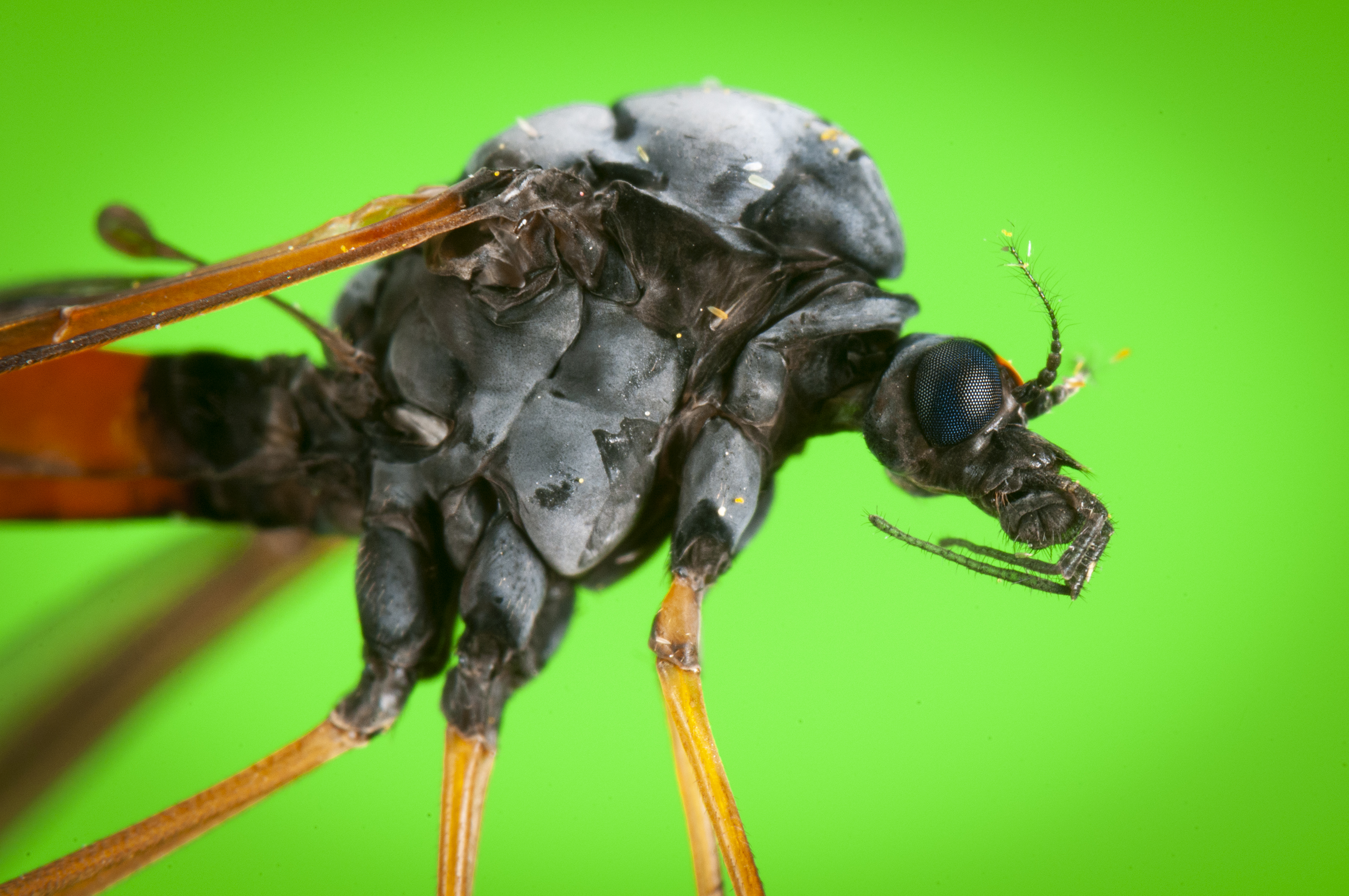
- Tipula sp., Adult, South Korea

Scientific classification
- Kingdom: Animalia
- Phylum: Arthropoda
- Clade: Pancrustacea
- Class: Insecta
- Order: Diptera
- Family: Tipulidae
- Subfamily: Tipulinae
- Genus: Tipula; Linnaeus, 1758

Type species
- Tipula oleracea Linnaeus, 1758

Subgenera
- Acutipula Alexander, 1924; Afrotipula Alexander, 1955; Arctotipula Alexander, 1934; Bellardina Edwards, 1931; Beringotipula Savchenko, 1961; Dendrotipula Savchenko, 1964; Emodotipula Alexander, 1966; Eremotipula Alexander, 1965; Eumicrotipula Alexander, 1923; Formotipula Matsumura, 1916; Hesperotipula Alexander, 1947; Indratipula Alexander, 1970; Kalatipula Alexander, 1971; Labiotipula Alexander, 1965; Lindnerina Mannheims, 1965; Lunatipula Edwards, 1931; Mediotipula Pierre, 1924; Microtipula Alexander, 1912; Nesotipula Alexander, 1921; Nippotipula Matsumura, 1916; Nobilotipula Alexander, 1943; Odonatisca Savchenko, 1956; Papuatipula Alexander, 1935; Pectinotipula Alexander, 1920; Platytipula Matsumura, 1916; Pterelachisus Rondani, 1842; Ramatipula Alexander, 1971; Savtshenkia Alexander, 1965; Schummelia Edwards, 1931; Serratipula Alexander, 1965; Setitipula Alexander, 1965; Sinotipula Alexander, 1935; Sivatipula Alexander, 1964; Spinitipula Alexander, 1963; Tipula Linnaeus, 1758; Tipulodinodes Alexander, 1965; Trichotipula Alexander, 1915; Triplicitipula Alexander, 1965; Vestiplex Bezzi, 1924; Yamatotipula Matsumura, 1916

= Tipula =

Genus of flies

Tipula is a very large insect genus in the fly family Tipulidae (crane flies). The members of this genus are sometimes collectively called common crane flies. Tipula contains over 2,000 species located throughout the world.

Like all crane flies, Tipula species have long bodies and long legs, somewhat resembling large mosquitos. Adults generally have a body length of 15–20 mm. They are usually brown with clear or brownish wings, although many species (especially in the subgenera Savtshenkia and Pterelachisus) instead have mottled wings, and some species of Lunatipula are orange instead of brown. They feed on nectar and are often active throughout the year, although many species only emerge as adults for a few months. Tipula maggots are sometimes known as "leather jackets" due to their tough skin.

Technical description: Discal cell present; M3 arises from M4; all tibiae spurred Antennae with whorls of long hairs. Rs usually long; Sc ends far from base of Rs; cell 4 always petiolate; body colour usually grey, brown or dull yellow, rarely black; praescutal stripes (when present) usually dull, rarely slightly shining.

Species of Tipula can be affected by fungal diseases, such as Zoophthora porteri, found in Tennessee, USA.

== Species ==
See list of Tipula species.

== Gallery ==
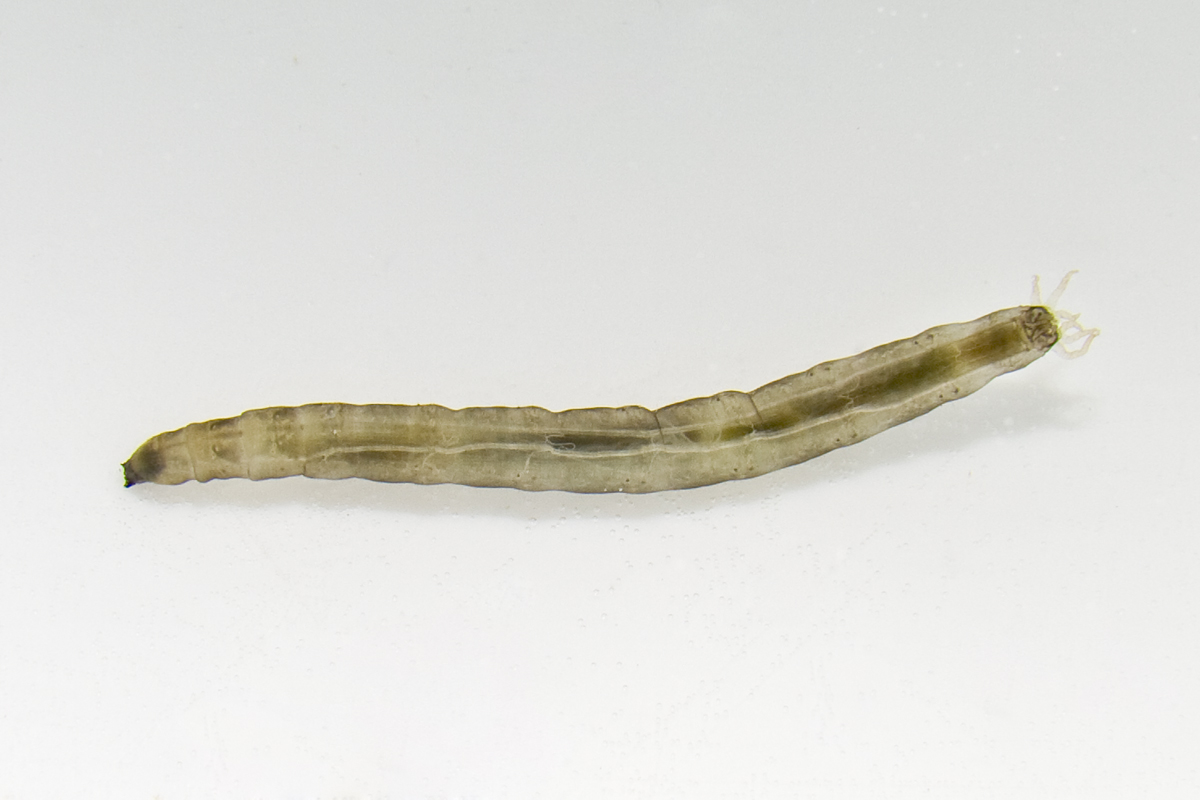
Larva

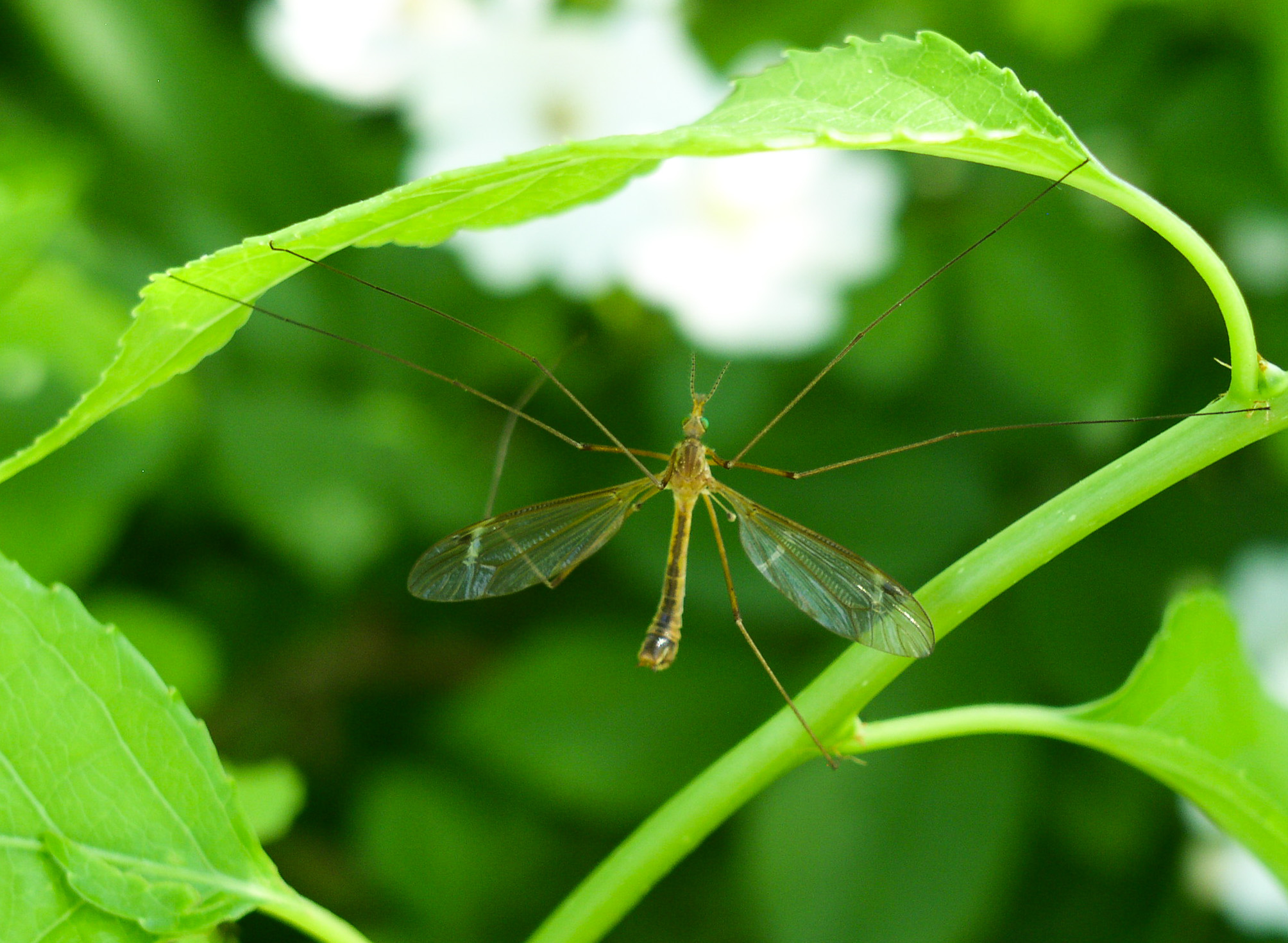
T. bicornis, male

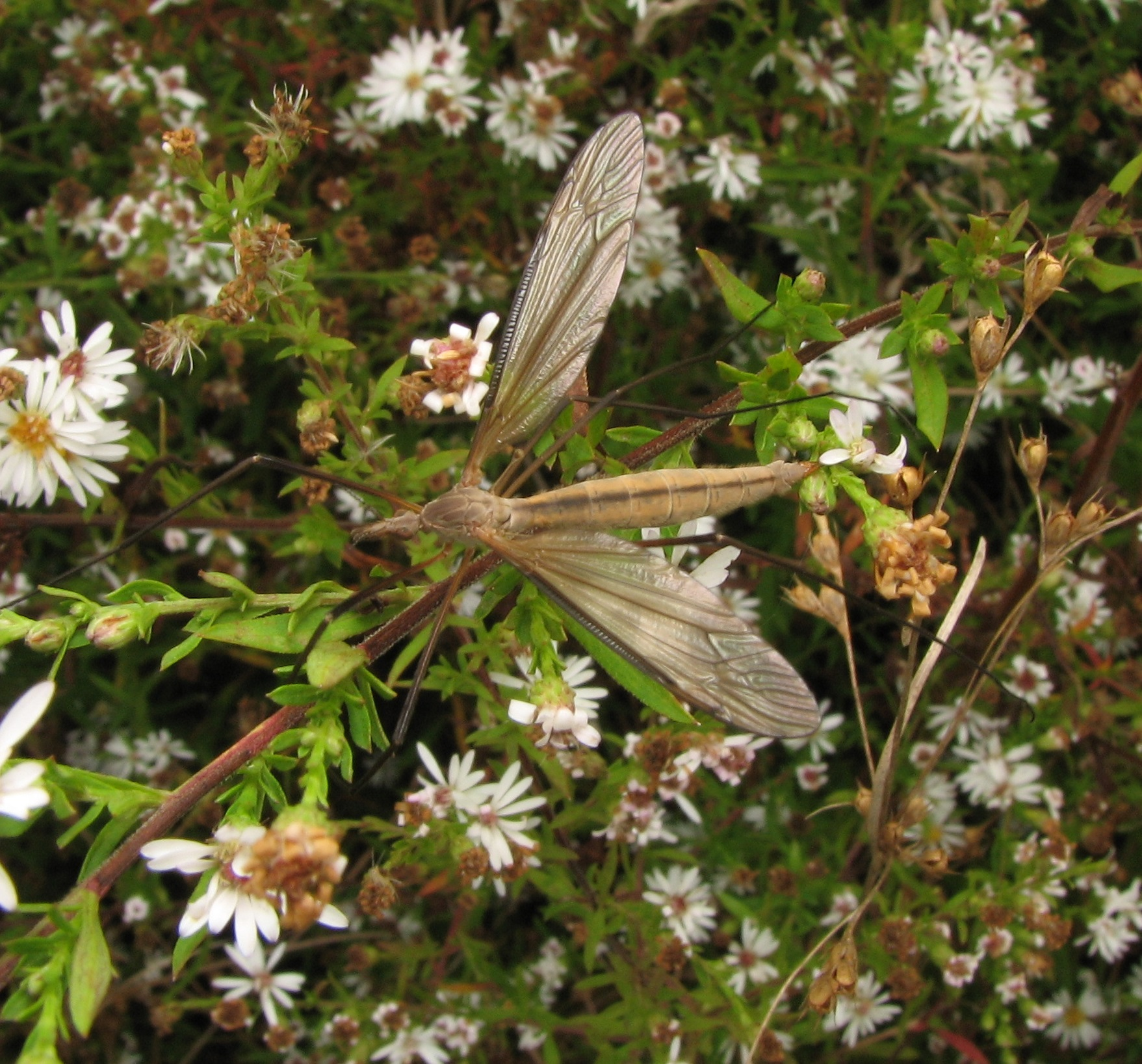
T. paterifera

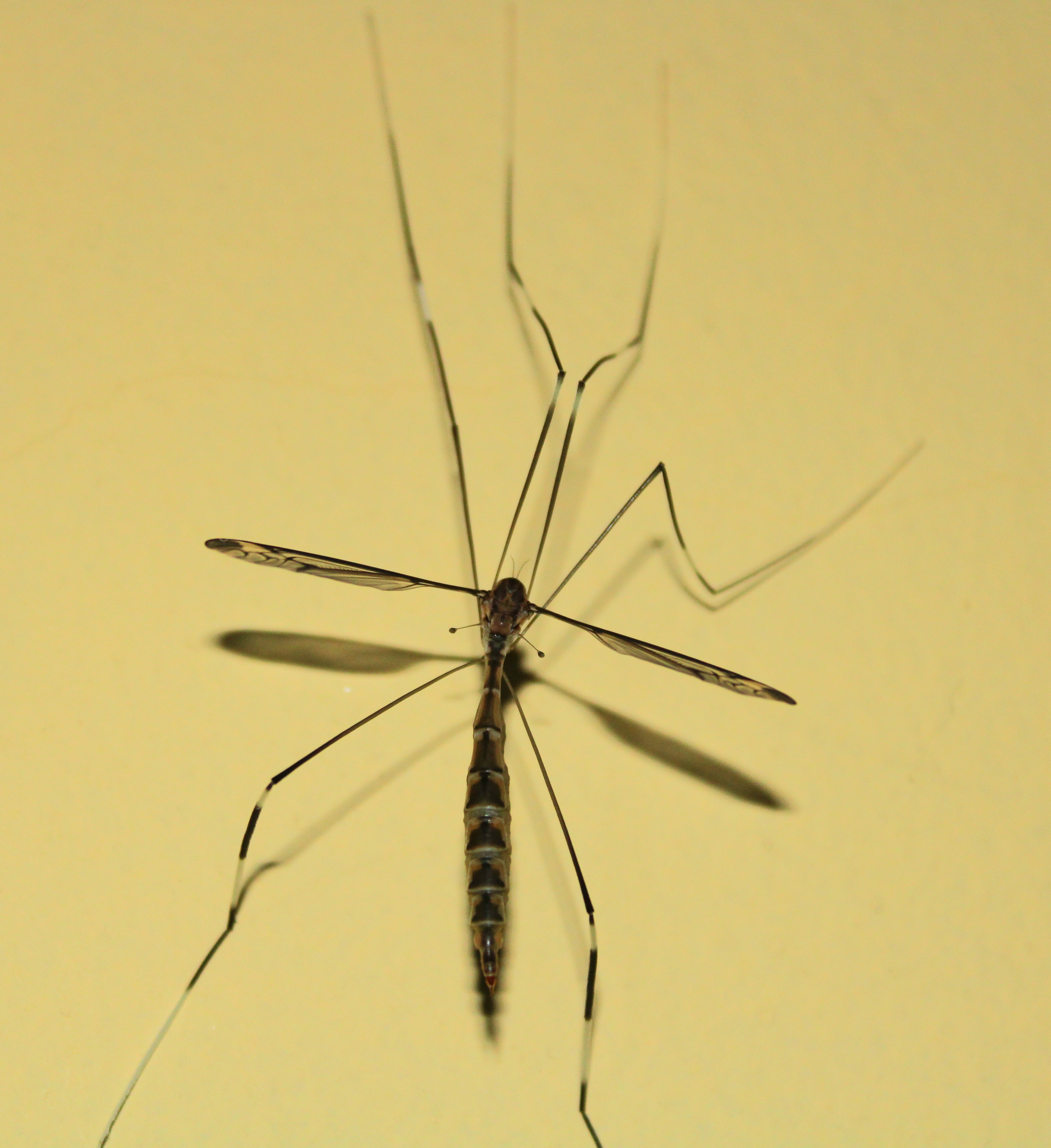
from Sri Lanka

T. rufina, Wales
