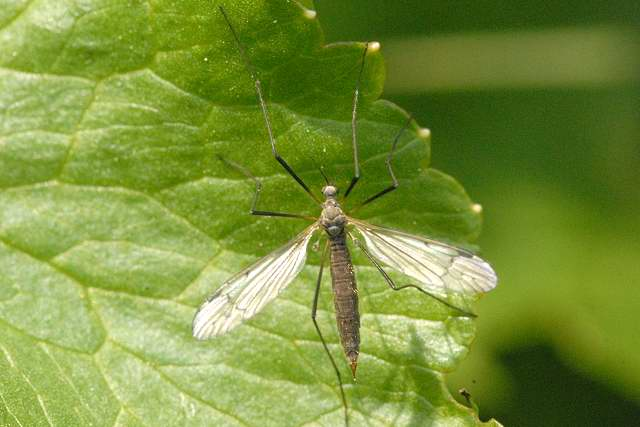
- Phylidorea squalens

Scientific classification
- Kingdom: Animalia
- Phylum: Arthropoda
- Class: Insecta
- Order: Diptera
- Family: Limoniidae
- Subfamily: Limnophilinae
- Genus: Phylidorea; Bigot, 1854

Type species
- Limnobia ferruginea Meigen, 1818

Subgenera
- Macrolabina Savchenko, 1986; Paraphylidorea Savchenko, 1986; Phylidorea Bigot, 1854

= Phylidorea =

Genus of flies

Phylidorea is a genus of crane flies in the family Limoniidae.

== Species ==
- Subgenus Macrolabina Savchenko, 1986

- P. alexanderi (Stary, 1974)
- P. latistyla Savchenko, 1986
- P. nigronotata (Siebke, 1870)
- P. pernigrita (Alexander, 1938)
- P. temelskin Podenas and Gelhaus, 2001

- Subgenus Paraphylidorea Savchenko, 1986

- P. fulvocostalis (Coquillett, 1899)
- P. fulvonervosa (Schummel, 1829)

- Subgenus Phylidorea Bigot, 1854

- P. abdominalis (Staeger, 1840)
- P. bicolor (Meigen, 1804)
- P. celaena (Alexander, 1970)
- P. costalis (Santos Abreu, 1923)
- P. ferruginea (Meigen, 1818)
- P. gracilistyla Savchenko, 1973
- P. heterogyna (Bergroth, 1913)
- P. hokkaidensis (Alexander, 1947)
- P. kuwayamai (Alexander, 1925)
- P. longicornis (Schummel, 1829)
- P. melanommata (Alexander, 1921)
- P. melanura (Lackschewitz, 1964)
- P. modesta (Lackschewitz, 1964)
- P. multidentata (Alexander, 1938)
- P. mundella (Alexander, 1931)
- P. nervosa (Schummel, 1829)
- P. squalens (Zetterstedt, 1838)
- P. subpoetica (Alexander, 1924)
- P. umbrarum (Krogerus, 1937)
- P. yamamotoi (Alexander, 1936)
