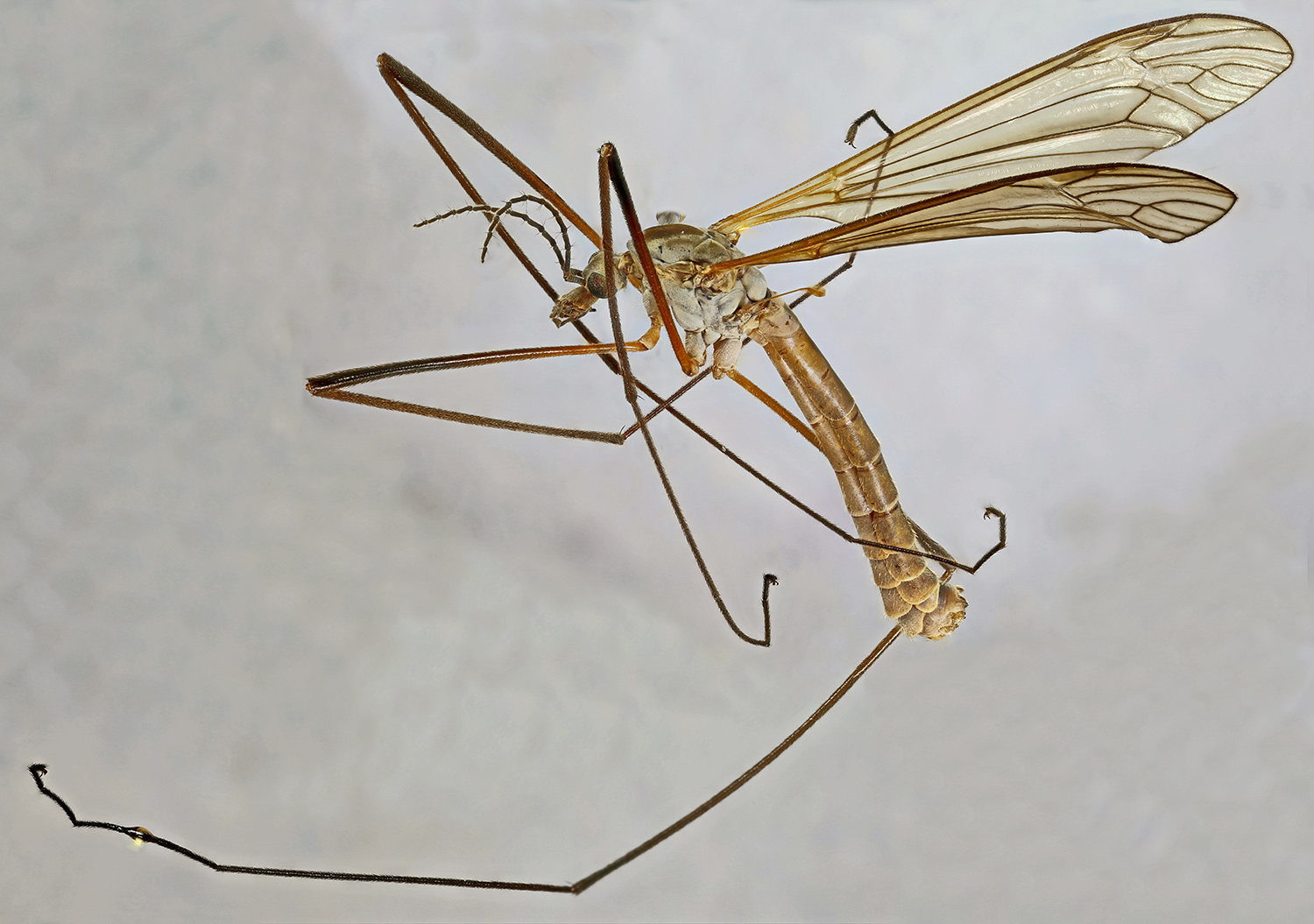
- Tipula melanoceros North Wales

Scientific classification
- Kingdom: Animalia
- Phylum: Arthropoda
- Clade: Pancrustacea
- Class: Insecta
- Order: Diptera
- Family: Tipulidae
- Genus: Tipula
- Subgenus: Platytipula
- Species: T. melanoceros

Binomial name
- Tipula melanoceros Schummel, 1833

= Tipula melanoceros =

Species of fly

Tipula melanoceros is a species of fly in the family Tipulidae. It is found in the Palearctic. It is in marshy woods and on moorland. Tipula melanoceros is a late summer species which flies from August to October.
