= Hammerschmidtia rufa =

Scientific classification
- Kingdom: Animalia
- Phylum: Arthropoda
- Class: Insecta
- Order: Diptera
- Family: Syrphidae
- Genus: Hammerschmidtia
- Species: H. rufa

Binomial name
- Hammerschmidtia rufa Fallén, 1817

Synonyms
- Hammerschmidtia ferruginea

Species of fly

Hammerschmidtia rufa (Fallén, 1817), the black-bristled logsitter, is an uncommon species of syrphid fly observed across North America. Hoverflies can remain nearly motionless in flight. The adults are also known as flower flies for they are commonly found on flowers from which they get both energy-giving nectar and protein-rich pollen. Larvae have been found under bark of aspen, elm, walnut, and willow. Described as Hammerschmidtia ferruginea by Curran.
