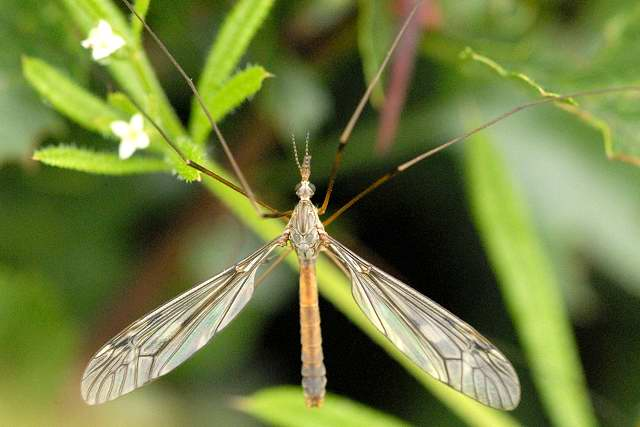
- Tipula variicornis male

Scientific classification
- Kingdom: Animalia
- Phylum: Arthropoda
- Clade: Pancrustacea
- Class: Insecta
- Order: Diptera
- Family: Tipulidae
- Genus: Tipula
- Subgenus: Schummelia
- Species: T. variicornis

Binomial name
- Tipula variicornis Schummel, 1833

Subspecies
- Tipula variicornis variicornis Schummel, 1833; Tipula variicornis incisicauda Savchenko, 1961

Synonyms
- Tipula picticornis Zetterstedt, 1855; Tipula latiligula Alexander, 1930

= Tipula variicornis =

Species of fly

Tipula variicornis is a species of cranefly.

== Distribution ==
Palaearctic.
