= Hammerschmidtia =

Scientific classification
- Kingdom: Animalia
- Phylum: Arthropoda
- Class: Insecta
- Order: Diptera
- Family: Syrphidae
- Subfamily: Eristalinae
- Tribe: Brachyopini
- Subtribe: Brachyopina
- Genus: Hammerschmidtia; Schummel, 1834

Type species
- Hammerschmidtia vittata Schummel, 1834 = ferruginea Fallen

Genus of flies

Hammerschmidtia is a Holarctic genus of hoverflies whose larvae live in sap under the bark of freshly fallen trees.

== Diagnostics ==
For terminology see Speight key to genera and glossary The face of the male is tuberculate, with long hairs on the upper and lower sides of the lower three-quarters of the arista. Most of the hairs are several times longer than the arista. The scutum is armed with very evident spines, while the anepisternum, postalar callus, and scutellum have strong bristles. The abdomen is twice as long as the thorax, and the first posterior cell does not end acutely from the apex of the wing. The apical section of R_{4+5} is longer than the crossvein r-m, and the upper marginal cross-vein M_{1} is curved inwards where it meets R_{4+5}. The legs are armed with spines and the anterior four tibiae terminate in a row of bristles. The femora are considerably swollen, especially the hind pair, which has numerous conspicuous spines below. Genitalia described by Sedman

== Species ==
- Hammerschmidtia ferruginea (Fallén, 1817)
- Hammerschmidtia ingrica (Stackelberg, 1952)
- Hammerschmidtia rufa
- Hammerschmidtia sedmani (Vockeroth, Moran & Skevington, 2019)
- Hammerschmidtia tropia (Chu, 1994)
