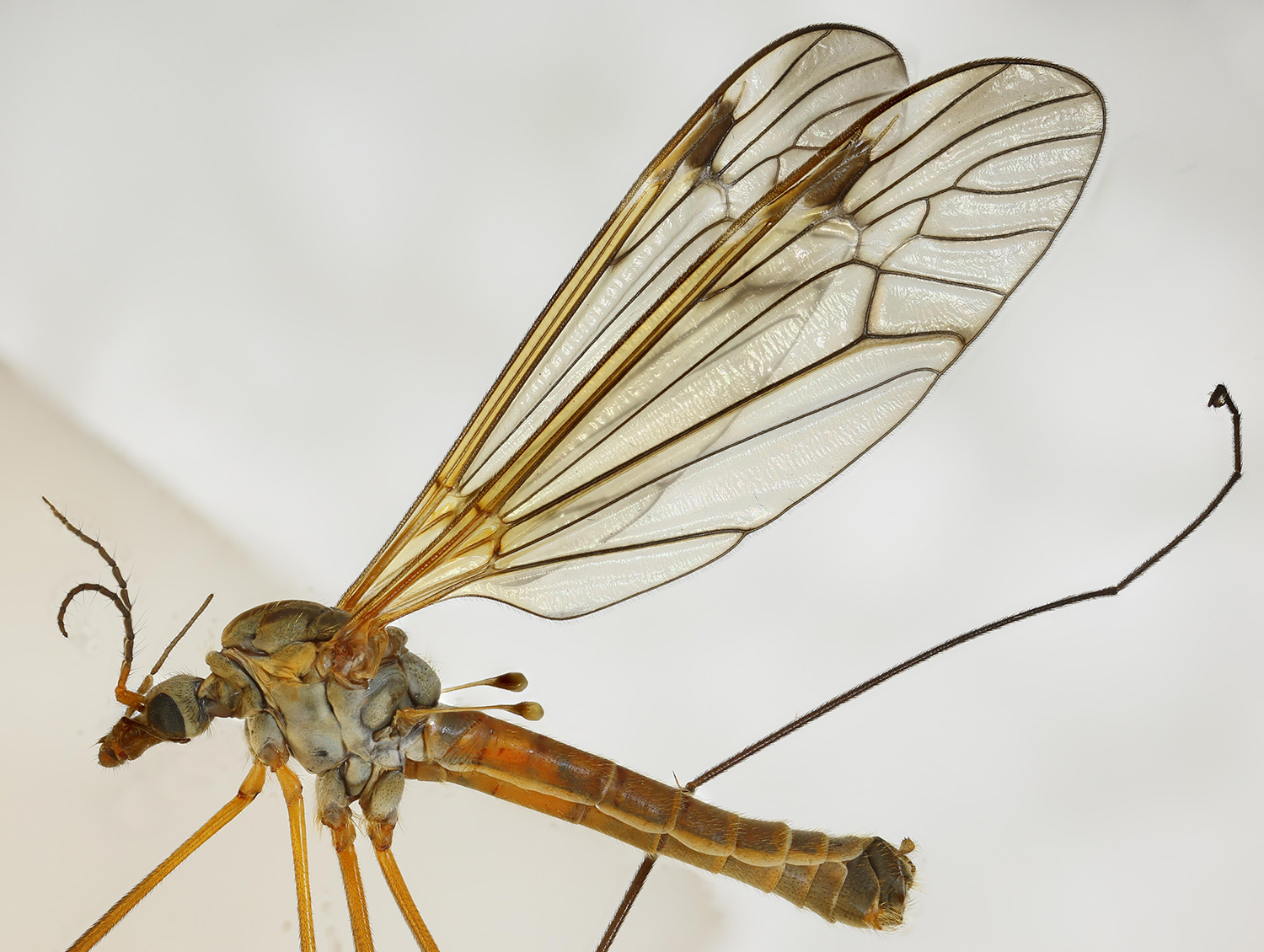
- Tipula submarmorata North Wales

Scientific classification
- Kingdom: Animalia
- Phylum: Arthropoda
- Clade: Pancrustacea
- Class: Insecta
- Order: Diptera
- Family: Tipulidae
- Genus: Tipula
- Subgenus: Pterelachisus
- Species: T. submarmorata

Binomial name
- Tipula submarmorata Schummel, 1833

= Tipula submarmorata =

Species of fly

Tipula submarmorata is a species of fly in the family Tipulidae. It is found in the Palearctic.
