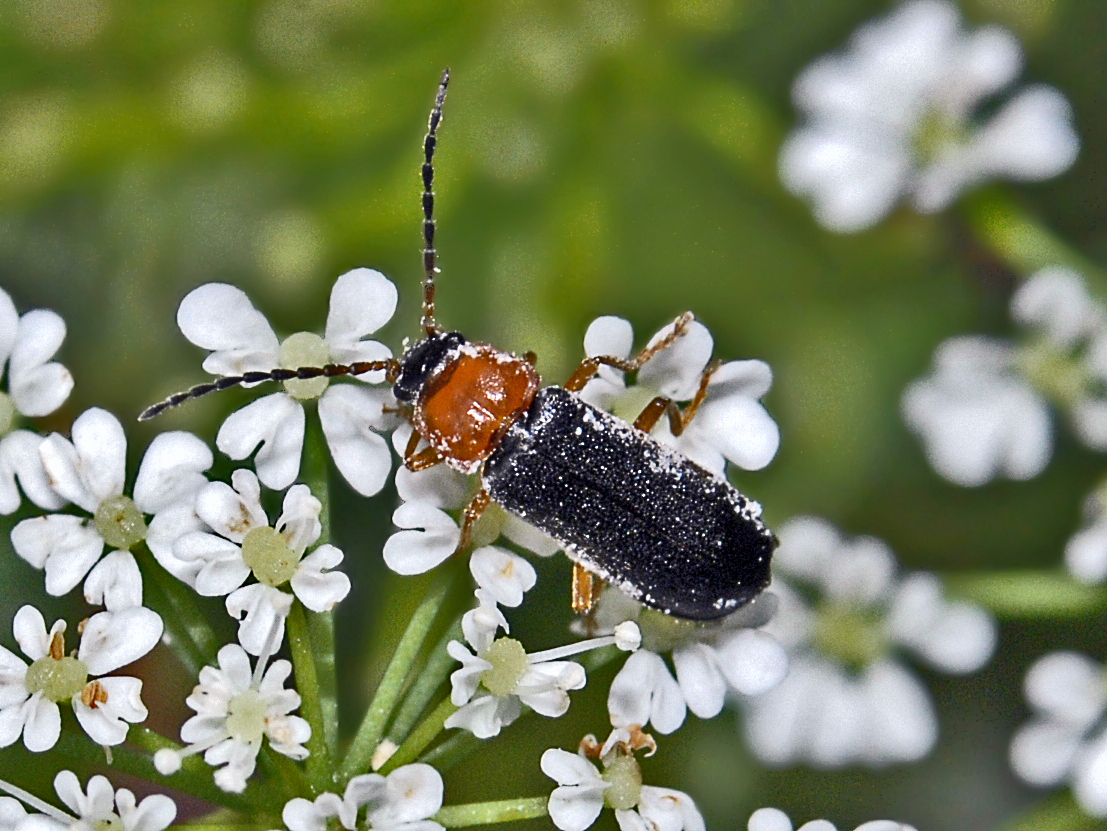

Scientific classification
- Kingdom: Animalia
- Phylum: Arthropoda
- Class: Insecta
- Order: Coleoptera
- Suborder: Polyphaga
- Infraorder: Elateriformia
- Family: Cantharidae
- Genus: Cratosilis
- Species: C. denticollis

Binomial name
- Cratosilis denticollis (Schummel, 1844)

Synonyms
- Pygidia denticollis Schummel, 1844

= Cratosilis denticollis =

Species of beetle

Cratosilis denticollis is a species of soldier beetle belonging to the family Cantharidae.

== Description ==
Cratosilis denticollis can reach a length of 5.5–7 millimetres (0.22–0.28 in). These small insects have a black head and a reddish pronotum, while elytrae are brownish and coarsely punctured deep. Pronotum rear corners are sharply angled (hence the Latin name denticollis, meaning toothed neck.

== Habitat ==
These beetles can be found from June to September in mountain and alpine areas, in forest edges, river meadows and grass heaths.

== Distribution ==
This species is present in Austria, Belgium, Czech Republic, France, Germany, Italy, Poland, Romania, Slovakia and Ukraine.
