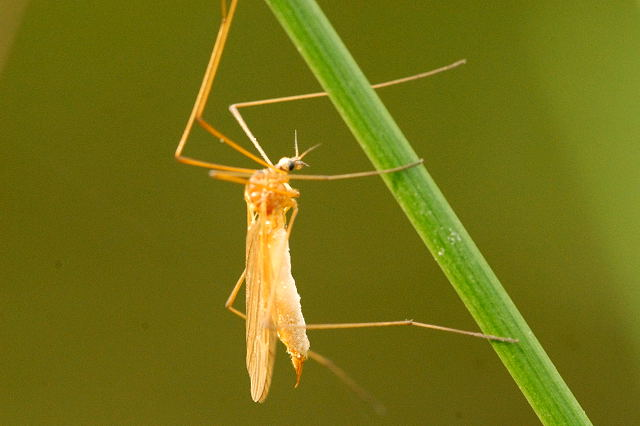
- Dicranomyia modesta

Scientific classification
- Kingdom: Animalia
- Phylum: Arthropoda
- Class: Insecta
- Order: Diptera
- Family: Limoniidae
- Subfamily: Limoniinae
- Genus: Dicranomyia; Stephens, 1829

Type species
- Limnobia modesta Meigen, 1818

Subgenera
- Alexandriaria Garrett, 1922; Caenoglochina Alexander, 1964; Caenolimonia Alexander, 1967; Cygnomyia Theischinger, 1994; Dicranomyia Stephens, 1829; Doaneomyia Alexander, 1921; Erostrata Savchenko, 1976; Euglochina Alexander, 1921; Glochina Meigen, 1830; Hesperolimonia Alexander, 1966; Idioglochina Alexander, 1921; Idiopyga Savchenko, 1987; Melanolimonia Alexander, 1965; Nealexandriaria Alexander, 1967; Neoglochina Alexander, 1967; Neolimnobia Alexander, 1928; Nesciomyia Theischinger, 1994; Numantia Bigot, 1854; Pandamyia Theischinger, 1994; Peripheroptera Schiner, 1868; Pseudoglochina Alexander, 1921; Sivalimnobia Alexander, 1963; Zalusa Enderlein, 1906; Zelandoglochina Alexander, 1924

Synonyms
- Dohrnia Bigot, 1854 (nec Newman, 1851)

= Dicranomyia =

Genus of flies

Dicranomyia is a genus of crane fly in the family Limoniidae. Larvae are mostly aquatic or semi-aquatic, with an exception found in a single Hawaiian Islands species which has a leaf-mining larva.

== Species ==
Subgenus Alexandriaria Garrett, 1922

- D. phalangioides (Alexander, 1943)
- D. suffusca (Garrett, 1922)
- D. whartoni Needham, 1908

Subgenus Caenoglochina Alexander, 1964

- D. acuminata Alexander, 1921
- D. apicata Alexander, 1914
- D. basistylata (Alexander, 1928)
- D. capitonius (Alexander, 1945)
- D. egae Alexander, 1921
- D. fieldi (Alexander, 1967)
- D. hoffmani (Alexander, 1927)
- D. lotax (Alexander, 1971)
- D. myctera (Alexander, 1967)
- D. napoensis Alexander, 1921
- D. paniculata (Byers, 1981)
- D. paucilobata (Alexander, 1940)
- D. pugnax (Alexander, 1946)
- D. rapax Alexander, 1921
- D. rogersiana Alexander, 1926
- D. scaenalis (Alexander, 1951)
- D. sica (Alexander, 1941)
- D. singularis (Alexander, 1944)
- D. somnifica (Alexander, 1943)
- D. subacuminata (Alexander, 1967)
- D. vorax (Alexander, 1941)
- D. wirthiana (Alexander, 1970)

Subgenus Caenolimonia Alexander, 1967

- D. amaryllis (Alexander, 1944)
- D. angustiviria (Alexander, 1979)
- D. brachycantha (Alexander, 1945)
- D. combostena (Alexander, 1967)
- D. contradistincta (Alexander, 1936)
- D. curvispinosa (Alexander, 1979)
- D. distantia (Alexander, 1971)
- D. galbipes (Alexander, 1967)
- D. interstitialis (Alexander, 1940)
- D. meconeura (Alexander, 1962)
- D. melaxantha (Alexander, 1934)
- D. meridensis (Alexander, 1940)
- D. neorepanda (Alexander, 1964)
- D. orthogonia (Alexander, 1945)
- D. osterhouti (Alexander, 1912)
- D. paprzyckii (Alexander, 1941)
- D. translucida (Alexander, 1912)
- D. xanthomela (Alexander, 1962)

Subgenus Cygnomyia Theischinger, 1994

- D. youngoloy (Theischinger, 1994)

Subgenus Dicranomyia Stephens, 1829

- D. aberdareica (Alexander, 1956)
- D. abigor (Alexander, 1967)
- D. abjuncta Alexander, 1927
- D. absens Brunetti, 1912
- D. acanthophallus Alexander, 1924
- D. acerba (Alexander, 1943)
- D. acinomeca (Alexander, 1968)
- D. acuproducta (Alexander, 1962)
- D. adirondacensis Alexander, 1922
- D. aegrotans Edwards, 1923
- D. aequispina Alexander, 1928
- D. affabilis (Alexander, 1952)
- D. affinis (Schummel, 1829)
- D. agape (Alexander, 1948)
- D. alascaensis Alexander, 1919
- D. albipennis (Macquart, 1838)
- D. albistigma Alexander, 1928
- D. albitarsis Alexander, 1915
- D. alboapicalis (Alexander, 1929)
- D. alfaroi Alexander, 1922
- D. alta de Meijere, 1913
- D. altandina (Alexander, 1957)
- D. ambigua (Alexander, 1929)
- D. amblymorpha (Alexander, 1968)
- D. amphionis (Alexander, 1952)
- D. amplificata (Alexander, 1940)
- D. amurensis Alexander, 1925
- D. ananta (Alexander, 1964)
- D. anax (Alexander, 1942)
- D. andicola (Alexander, 1912)
- D. andinalta (Alexander, 1957)
- D. annulifera Alexander, 1922
- D. annulipes Skuse, 1890
- D. anteapicalis (Alexander, 1947)
- D. aperta Wahlgren, 1904
- D. apiceglabra (Alexander, 1968)
- D. appa (Theischinger, 1994)
- D. apposita (Alexander, 1942)
- D. archeyi Alexander, 1924
- D. argentina (Alexander, 1912)
- D. ariadne (Alexander, 1942)
- D. arta (Alexander, 1954)
- D. arthuriana Alexander, 1924
- D. aspropoda (Alexander, 1965)
- D. athabascae Alexander, 1927
- D. atrescens Alexander, 1915
- D. atritarsis (Alexander, 1949)
- D. atropos Savchenko, 1983
- D. atrostyla (Alexander, 1942)
- D. aurantiothorax (Alexander, 1941)
- D. auripennis Skuse, 1890
- D. autumnalis (Staeger, 1840)
- D. axierasta (Alexander, 1952)
- D. baileyana (Alexander, 1963)
- D. baileyi Edwards, 1928
- D. balli (Theischinger, 1994)
- D. basilewskyana (Alexander, 1977) – Basilewsky's cranefly
- D. basiseta Alexander, 1924
- D. basuto (Alexander, 1956)
- D. bethae bethae (Alexander, 1945)
- D. bethae contexta (Alexander, 1945)
- D. bhima (Alexander, 1965)
- D. bhutanica (Alexander, 1942)
- D. bickeli (Theischinger, 1996)
- D. bicomifera (Alexander, 1943)
- D. bidigitata (Alexander, 1958)
- D. bigladia (Alexander, 1942)
- D. bilobula (Alexander, 1958)
- D. boliviana (Alexander, 1930)
- D. boniniana (Alexander, 1972)
- D. boorana (Theischinger, 1994)
- D. borinquenia (Alexander, 1968)
- D. boulariensis (Hynes, 1993)
- D. brachyneura (Alexander, 1932)
- D. brevicubitalis (Alexander, 1947)
- D. brevigladia (Alexander, 1962)
- D. brevirama Alexander, 1922
- D. brevivena Osten Sacken, 1869
- D. brevivenula (Alexander, 1929)
- D. brookesi Edwards, 1923
- D. browni (Alexander, 1932)
- D. brunneistigma (Alexander, 1971)
- D. bugledichae (Theischinger, 1994)
- D. bullockiana (Alexander, 1939)
- D. bunyip (Theischinger, 1994)
- D. buxtoni Edwards, 1927
- D. calianensis (Alexander, 1931)
- D. calliergon (Alexander, 1939)
- D. candidella (Alexander, 1931)
- D. capella (Alexander, 1932)
- D. capicola Alexander, 1921
- D. catamarcana (Alexander, 1929)
- D. cautinensis (Alexander, 1941)
- D. cerbereana (Alexander, 1929)
- D. cervina Doane, 1908
- D. chalybeicolor (Alexander, 1954)
- D. chandra (Alexander, 1964)
- D. chazeaui (Hynes, 1993)
- D. chillcotti (Alexander, 1968)
- D. chimborazicola (Alexander, 1946)
- D. chimera (Alexander, 1972)
- D. chlorotica (Philippi, 1866)
- D. chorea (Meigen, 1818)
- D. cinctitibia (Alexander, 1934)
- D. cinerascens Brunetti, 1912
- D. cinerella Alexander, 1923
- D. cingulifera Alexander, 1928
- D. cinnamonota Alexander, 1921
- D. circassica Lackschewitz, 1941
- D. citrina Doane, 1900
- D. claribasis (Alexander, 1945)
- D. clarissima (Alexander, 1967)
- D. clarkeana (Alexander, 1970)
- D. clarki (Alexander, 1930)
- D. clathrata Savchenko, 1984
- D. clavigera (Alexander, 1931)
- D. clavistyla (Alexander, 1957)
- D. clivicola Speiser, 1909
- D. clotho (Alexander, 1964)
- D. coheri (Alexander, 1964)
- D. collita (Alexander, 1978)
- D. commina (Alexander, 1967)
- D. commixta (Alexander, 1933)
- D. complacita (Alexander, 1942)
- D. conchifera (Strobl, 1900)
- D. confusa Alexander, 1921
- D. consimilis (Zetterstedt, 1838)
- D. contraria (Alexander, 1953)
- D. contristans (Alexander, 1946)
- D. conulifera Edwards, 1923
- D. convergens de Meijere, 1911
- D. convoluta Hancock, 2006
- D. coxitalis (Alexander, 1934)
- D. cramptoniana (Alexander, 1929)
- D. crassispina Alexander, 1923
- D. croceiapicalis (Alexander, 1962)
- D. cruzi (Alexander, 1936)
- D. cuneata Skuse, 1890
- D. cuneipennis Alexander, 1923
- D. cunninghamensis (Alexander, 1933)
- D. dactylophora (Alexander, 1964)
- D. dampfi Alexander, 1925
- D. davaoensis (Alexander, 1931)
- D. defuncta (Osten Sacken, 1860)
- D. delicata Brunetti, 1912
- D. depauperata Alexander, 1918
- D. dibelone (Alexander, 1969)
- D. dichroa Savchenko, 1974
- D. dicksoniae (Alexander, 1930)
- D. didyma (Meigen, 1804)
- D. dilanio (Alexander, 1958)
- D. dingaan (Alexander, 1960)
- D. dissoluta (Alexander, 1929)
- D. distans Osten Sacken, 1860
- D. distendens Lundstrom, 1912
- D. diura (Alexander, 1942)
- D. diversigladia (Alexander, 1942)
- D. diversispina Alexander, 1923
- D. divisa (Alexander, 1929)
- D. dolerosa (Alexander, 1931)
- D. dorrigensis (Alexander, 1930)
- D. dorsalis Skuse, 1890
- D. dorsolobata (Alexander, 1946)
- D. draupadi (Alexander, 1964)
- D. dravidiana (Alexander, 1951)
- D. dreisbachi (Alexander, 1965)
- D. ebriola (Alexander, 1928)
- D. elegantula Alexander, 1913
- D. elnora (Alexander, 1929)
- D. elquiensis (Blanchard, 1852)
- D. empelia (Alexander, 1962)
- D. encharis (Alexander, 1964)
- D. erichtho (Alexander, 1950)
- D. errabunda (Alexander, 1929)
- D. erratica (Alexander, 1934)
- D. etnurra (Theischinger, 1994)
- D. euernes (Alexander, 1964)
- D. eulaliae Geiger & Stary, 1994
- D. euryrhyncha (Alexander, 1967)
- D. evenhuisi (Hynes, 1993)
- D. exaeta Alexander, 1927
- D. exercita (Alexander, 1929)
- D. extranea (Alexander, 1944)
- D. falcicula (Alexander, 1962)
- D. farri (Alexander, 1964)
- D. fasciata Hutton, 1900
- D. fata (Theischinger, 1994)
- D. fijiana Alexander, 1924
- D. filicauda Alexander, 1925
- D. flagellata Edwards, 1928
- D. flagellifer Alexander, 1928
- D. flavaperta (Alexander, 1941)
- D. flavida (Philippi, 1866)
- D. flavidella (Alexander, 1930)
- D. flavigenu Stary & Freidberg, 2007
- D. flavobrunnea Brunetti, 1912
- D. flavocincta (Brunetti, 1918)
- D. flavofascialis Alexander, 1924
- D. flavohumeralis (Alexander, 1931)
- D. floridana Osten Sacken, 1869
- D. fragilis (Theischinger, 1994)
- D. francki (Alexander, 1932)
- D. fraterna Brunetti, 1912
- D. frivola Alexander, 1928
- D. frontalis (Staeger, 1840)
- D. fugax (Alexander, 1964)
- D. fullawayi Alexander, 1915
- D. fulva Doane, 1900
- D. fulviceps Alexander, 1925
- D. fulvinota Alexander, 1923
- D. funesta Alexander, 1922
- D. furthi Stary & Freidberg, 2007
- D. fuscinota Stary, 2009
- D. galapagoensis (Alexander, 1962)
- D. gardineri Edwards, 1912
- D. gemina (Alexander, 1924)
- D. gentilis (Alexander, 1950)
- D. geronimo (Alexander, 1949)
- D. geyserensis (Alexander, 1943)
- D. gibbera Alexander, 1916
- D. gladiator Osten Sacken, 1860
- D. globulicornis Alexander, 1924
- D. gloria (Byers, 1994)
- D. gloriosa (Alexander, 1912)
- D. goana Alexander, 1927
- D. goritiensis (Mik, 1864)
- D. gracilirostris (Alexander, 1938)
- D. gracilis Edwards, 1923
- D. grimshawi Alexander, 1919
- D. grishma (Alexander, 1964)
- D. guamicola (Alexander, 1942)
- D. gubernatoria Alexander, 1924
- D. guillarmodana (Alexander, 1970)
- D. guttata (Philippi, 1866)
- D. guttula Alexander, 1915
- D. haeretica Osten Sacken, 1869
- D. hainaniana (Alexander, 1949)
- D. halobia (Tokunaga, 1936)
- D. halophila (Alexander, 1929)
- D. halterata Osten Sacken, 1869
- D. handlirschi Lackschewitz, 1928
- D. hardyana (Byers, 1985)
- D. harmonia (Alexander, 1956)
- D. harpax (Alexander, 1952)
- D. hawaiiensis Grimshaw, 1901
- D. helmsi Skuse, 1890
- D. hemimelas Alexander, 1922
- D. heteracantha Alexander, 1923
- D. hirsutissima (Alexander, 1962)
- D. homichlophila (Alexander, 1958)
- D. hostica (Alexander, 1938)
- D. hudsoni Edwards, 1923
- D. humerosa (Alexander, 1942)
- D. humidicola Osten Sacken, 1860
- D. hyalinata (Zetterstedt, 1851)
- D. idonea Alexander, 1922
- D. ignara (Alexander, 1967)
- D. illepida (Alexander, 1944)
- D. illumina (Alexander, 1958)
- D. illustris (Alexander, 1944)
- D. imitabilis (Alexander, 1942)
- D. immanis (Alexander, 1950)
- D. immodesta Osten Sacken, 1860
- D. inanis (Alexander, 1934)
- D. incisuralis Skuse, 1890
- D. incisurata Lackschewitz, 1928
- D. incompta (Alexander, 1922)
- D. indefensa (Alexander, 1939)
- D. indefessa (Alexander, 1965)
- D. infensa (Alexander, 1938)
- D. infumata (Philippi, 1866)
- D. ingrata Alexander, 1928
- D. inhabilis (Alexander, 1949)
- D. iniquispina (Hardy, 1953)
- D. innocens Brunetti, 1912
- D. innocua Alexander, 1927
- D. inscita (Alexander, 1935)
- D. insignifica (Alexander, 1912)
- D. insolabilis (Alexander, 1946)
- D. insolita (Alexander, 1979)
- D. insularis Mik, 1881
- D. intermedia Santos Abreu, 1923
- D. interrupta (Nielsen, 1966)
- D. invalida Alexander, 1916
- D. involuta (Alexander, 1968)
- D. isabellina Doane, 1900
- D. itatiayana (Alexander, 1944)
- D. jacobus Alexander, 1919
- D. jorgenseni Alexander, 1919
- D. jujuyensis Alexander, 1924
- D. junctura (Alexander, 1949)
- D. kalki (Alexander, 1966)
- D. kallakkure (Theischinger, 1994)
- D. kamakensis Stary, 1993
- D. kandybinae Savchenko, 1987
- D. karma (Alexander, 1948)
- D. kauaiensis Grimshaw, 1901
- D. kaurava (Alexander, 1964)
- D. kermadecensis (Alexander, 1973)
- D. kernensis (Alexander, 1966)
- D. kirishimana Alexander, 1925
- D. knabi (Alexander, 1912)
- D. kowinka (Theischinger, 1994)
- D. koxinga (Alexander, 1930)
- D. kraaiensis (Alexander, 1964)
- D. kraussi (Alexander, 1951)
- D. kubera (Alexander, 1964)
- D. kulin (Alexander, 1933)
- D. kurnai (Alexander, 1933)
- D. kuscheliana (Alexander, 1952)
- D. labecula (Alexander, 1942)
- D. labellata (Alexander, 1969)
- D. lachesis Savchenko, 1983
- D. lacroixi Alexander, 1926
- D. laffooniana (Alexander, 1948)
- D. lagunta (Theischinger, 1994)
- D. laistes (Alexander, 1967)
- D. lapazensis (Alexander, 1962)
- D. lassa (Alexander, 1937)
- D. latebra (Alexander, 1967)
- D. laticellula (Alexander, 1932)
- D. latiflava (Alexander, 1931)
- D. latispina (Alexander, 1942)
- D. lawrencei (Alexander, 1958)
- D. lebombo (Alexander, 1960)
- D. lemmonae (Alexander, 1953)
- D. leptomera (Alexander, 1972)
- D. lethe (Alexander, 1938)
- D. lewisi (Alexander, 1964)
- D. libertoides (Alexander, 1912)
- D. ligayai (Alexander, 1931)
- D. limonioides Savchenko, 1974
- D. lindsayi Alexander, 1924
- D. lineicollis (Blanchard, 1852)
- D. linsdalei (Alexander, 1943)
- D. livida (Say, 1829)
- D. livornica Lackschewitz, 1928
- D. loarinna (Theischinger, 1994)
- D. longicollis (Macquart, 1846)
- D. longipennis (Schummel, 1829)
- D. longiunguis Stary & Freidberg, 2007
- D. longiventris Alexander, 1913
- D. lorettae Geiger, 1985
- D. loveridgeana (Alexander, 1962)
- D. luaboensis (Alexander, 1960)
- D. lucida de Meijere, 1918
- D. lugubris de Meijere, 1924
- D. lutea (Meigen, 1818)
- D. luteiapicalis (Alexander, 1962)
- D. luteipennis Goetghebuer, 1920
- D. luteipes Alexander, 1923
- D. luteitarsis (Alexander, 1965)
- D. luteonitens Edwards, 1923
- D. lydia (Alexander, 1950)
- D. maderensis (Wollaston, 1858)
- D. magninota Stary, 2009
- D. maligna (Alexander, 1945)
- D. malina (Alexander, 1964)
- D. malitiosa (Alexander, 1942)
- D. marina Skuse, 1890
- D. marshalli Alexander, 1920
- D. masafuerae (Alexander, 1952)
- D. mascarensis Alexander, 1921
- D. mattheyi Geiger, 1985
- D. mecogastra (Alexander, 1964)
- D. megastigmosa Alexander, 1922
- D. melanacaena (Alexander, 1970)
- D. melanantha Savchenko, 1984
- D. melanderi (Alexander, 1945)
- D. melanocera Alexander, 1925
- D. melanopleura (Alexander, 1931)
- D. melanoptera (Alexander, 1934)
- D. melina Alexander, 1924
- D. memnon (Alexander, 1960)
- D. meridicola (Alexander, 1943)
- D. mesosternatoides Alexander, 1924
- D. michaeli (Theowald, 1977)
- D. microentmema (Alexander, 1964)
- D. micronychia Lackschewitz, 1941
- D. microscola (Alexander, 1967)
- D. microsoma (Alexander, 1944)
- D. microsomoides (Alexander, 1954)
- D. midas (Alexander, 1954)
- D. millemurro (Theischinger, 1994)
- D. misera Riedel, 1921
- D. miseranda (Alexander, 1945)
- D. mishimana (Alexander, 1970)
- D. mistura (Alexander, 1942)
- D. mitis (Meigen, 1830)
- D. modesta (Meigen, 1818)
- D. moesta Alexander, 1923
- D. monilicornis Hutton, 1900
- D. moniliformis Doane, 1900
- D. monochromera Edwards, 1923
- D. monorhaphis (Alexander, 1980)
- D. monostromia (Tokunaga, 1930)
- D. montium (Alexander, 1929)
- D. mosselica (Alexander, 1949)
- D. motepa (Theischinger, 1994)
- D. muliercula (Alexander, 1942)
- D. mulsa Alexander, 1916
- D. multispina Alexander, 1922
- D. muta (Alexander, 1937)
- D. mutata (Alexander, 1935)
- D. naga (Alexander, 1964)
- D. nairobii Alexander, 1919
- D. nakula (Alexander, 1964)
- D. namwambae (Alexander, 1956)
- D. neabjuncta (Alexander, 1963)
- D. neananta (Alexander, 1967)
- D. nebulifera Alexander, 1922
- D. nefasta (Alexander, 1944)
- D. nelsoniana Alexander, 1925
- D. neofascipennis (Alexander, 1967)
- D. neoguttula (Alexander, 1958)
- D. neomidas (Alexander, 1963)
- D. neopulchripennis (Alexander, 1940)
- D. neopunctulata (Alexander, 1931)
- D. nephelia (Alexander, 1978)
- D. nephelodes Alexander, 1922
- D. nielseniana (Alexander, 1949)
- D. nigrescens Hutton, 1900
- D. nigritorus (Alexander, 1975)
- D. nigrobarbata (Alexander, 1964)
- D. nigropolita Alexander, 1923
- D. niveifusca (Alexander, 1964)
- D. norfolcensis Alexander, 1922
- D. nothofagi (Alexander, 1929)
- D. novemmaculata (Strobl, 1906)
- D. nullanulla (Theischinger, 1994)
- D. obscura Skuse, 1890
- D. obscuripennis Skuse, 1890
- D. obtusiloba (Alexander, 1956)
- D. obtusistylus (Alexander, 1925)
- D. ochripes (Alexander, 1955)
- D. octacantha (Alexander, 1933)
- D. ohlini Alexander, 1920
- D. omi (Theischinger, 1994)
- D. omissa (Alexander, 1912)
- D. omissinervis de Meijere, 1918
- D. omissivena Alexander, 1922
- D. onerosa Alexander, 1928
- D. opima Alexander, 1921
- D. ornata (Meigen, 1818)
- D. ornatipennis (Blanchard, 1852)
- D. orthia (Alexander, 1931)
- D. orthioides (Alexander, 1932)
- D. otagensis Alexander, 1924
- D. ovalistigma (Alexander, 1951)
- D. ozarkensis (Alexander, 1968)
- D. pallidinota Stary, 2009
- D. palliditerga (Alexander, 1942)
- D. pammelas Alexander, 1925
- D. pampoecila Alexander, 1922
- D. panthera (Theischinger, 1994)
- D. parjanya (Alexander, 1967)
- D. particeps Doane, 1908
- D. parvati (Alexander, 1967)
- D. parvistylata (Alexander, 1960)
- D. patens Lundstrom, 1907
- D. patricia Stary, 1982
- D. patruelis Alexander, 1924
- D. paupercula Alexander, 1921
- D. pectinunguis (Tokunaga, 1940)
- D. pedestris (Alexander, 1952)
- D. pelates (Alexander, 1962)
- D. penana (Alexander, 1957)
- D. pendulifera Alexander, 1923
- D. pennifera (Alexander, 1945)
- D. penrissenensis Edwards, 1926
- D. pentadactyla (Alexander, 1964)
- D. peralta (Alexander, 1946)
- D. perdistalis (Alexander, 1943)
- D. perdocta (Alexander, 1954)
- D. perexcelsior (Alexander, 1962)
- D. perflaveola (Alexander, 1927)
- D. peringueyi Alexander, 1917
- D. perpulchra (Alexander, 1928)
- D. perpuncticosta (Alexander, 1950)
- D. perretracta (Alexander, 1942)
- D. perserena (Alexander, 1946)
- D. pertruncata (Alexander, 1962)
- D. perturbata (Alexander, 1978)
- D. phalaris (Alexander, 1956)
- D. phatta (Philippi, 1866)
- D. picticauda (Alexander, 1979)
- D. pictithorax Alexander, 1923
- D. pietatis (Alexander, 1943)
- D. pinodes (Alexander, 1929)
- D. pitoa (Theischinger, 1994)
- D. pleurilineata Riedel, 1917
- D. pluricomata (Alexander, 1964)
- D. plurispina Alexander, 1925
- D. pluvialis (Alexander, 1929)
- D. poli (Alexander, 1941)
- D. polysticta (Philippi, 1866)
- D. polystonyx (Alexander, 1968)
- D. pontica Lackschewitz, 1941
- D. pontophila (Tokunaga, 1940)
- D. posticanivea (Alexander, 1978)
- D. praecellens (Alexander, 1944)
- D. praepostera Alexander, 1925
- D. praevia (Alexander, 1952)
- D. primaeva (Alexander, 1929)
- D. profunda Alexander, 1925
- D. prolixistyla (Alexander, 1981)
- D. pudica Osten Sacken, 1860
- D. pudicoides (Alexander, 1930)
- D. pulchripennis Brunetti, 1912
- D. puncticosta Brunetti, 1912
- D. punctipennis Skuse, 1890
- D. punctulata de Meijere, 1911
- D. punctulatella (Alexander, 1933)
- D. punctulatina (Alexander, 1960)
- D. punctulatoides (Alexander, 1932)
- D. punoensis (Alexander, 1946)
- D. quadrigladia (Alexander, 1944)
- D. quadrituberculata (Alexander, 1937)
- D. quinquenotata (Brunetti, 1918)
- D. radegasti Stary, 1993
- D. rapida (Alexander, 1946)
- D. ravana (Alexander, 1964)
- D. ravida Alexander, 1925
- D. rectidens (Alexander, 1934)
- D. rectistyla (Alexander, 1967)
- D. recurvistyla (Alexander, 1975)
- D. reductissima (Alexander, 1952)
- D. redundans (Alexander, 1956)
- D. regifica Alexander, 1916
- D. remota Skuse, 1890
- D. repanda Edwards, 1923
- D. repentina (Alexander, 1929)
- D. reticulata (Alexander, 1912)
- D. retrusa (Alexander, 1930)
- D. reversalis Alexander, 1922
- D. rhinoceros (Alexander, 1945)
- D. rixosa (Alexander, 1964)
- D. rodriguensis Edwards, 1923
- D. rostrifera Osten Sacken, 1869
- D. rostrotruncata (Alexander, 1979)
- D. rudra (Alexander, 1960)
- D. sabroskyana (Byers, 1982)
- D. sanctaecruzae Alexander, 1920
- D. sanctaehelenae (Alexander, 1962)
- D. sanctigeorgii Edwards, 1927
- D. satura (Alexander, 1956)
- D. saxatilis Skuse, 1890
- D. saxemarina (Alexander, 1937)
- D. scelio (Alexander, 1965)
- D. schindleri (Alexander, 1962)
- D. schmidiana (Alexander, 1975)
- D. scimitar (Alexander, 1942)
- D. seducta Alexander, 1923
- D. selkirki Alexander, 1920
- D. semantica (Alexander, 1932)
- D. semicuneata Alexander, 1924
- D. seposita (Alexander, 1929)
- D. sera (Walker, 1848)
- D. serratiloba (Alexander, 1950)
- D. shelfordi (Alexander, 1944)
- D. shinanoensis (Alexander, 1933)
- D. shirakii Alexander, 1923
- D. sibyllina (Alexander, 1929)
- D. sielediva (Alexander, 1960)
- D. signata de Meijere, 1919
- D. signatella Stary & Freidberg, 2007
- D. simillima (Alexander, 1912)
- D. simulans (Walker, 1848)
- D. skanda (Alexander, 1964)
- D. smythiana (Alexander, 1942)
- D. snelli (Edwards, 1934)
- D. sparsa Alexander, 1924
- D. sparsituber (Alexander, 1962)
- D. sperata Alexander, 1922
- D. spinosissima Geiger & Stary, 1994
- D. splendidula (Alexander, 1930)
- D. sponsa Alexander, 1922
- D. sternolobatoides (Alexander, 1964)
- D. stigmata Doane, 1900
- D. strobli Pagast, 1941
- D. stuardoi (Alexander, 1952)
- D. stulta Osten Sacken, 1860
- D. stygipennis Alexander, 1919
- D. subalbitarsis (Alexander, 1930)
- D. subandicola (Alexander, 1947)
- D. subandina (Alexander, 1913)
- D. subchlorotica (Alexander, 1969)
- D. subconfusa (Alexander, 1958)
- D. subdichroa Savchenko, 1974
- D. subdidyma (Alexander, 1975)
- D. subdola Alexander, 1913
- D. subfasciata Alexander, 1924
- D. subfascipennis Brunetti, 1912
- D. subflavida (Alexander, 1929)
- D. sublimis (Alexander, 1932)
- D. submarina (Theischinger, 1994)
- D. submidas (Alexander, 1956)
- D. submulsa (Alexander, 1971)
- D. submutata (Alexander, 1942)
- D. suborthia (Alexander, 1932)
- D. subpulchripennis (Alexander, 1931)
- D. subpunctulata (Alexander, 1930)
- D. subravida Alexander, 1928
- D. subredundans (Alexander, 1975)
- D. subremota Alexander, 1922
- D. subreticulata (Alexander, 1943)
- D. subsordida Edwards, 1928
- D. substricta Alexander, 1928
- D. subtristoides (Alexander, 1945)
- D. subviridis Alexander, 1922
- D. sulphuralis Edwards, 1923
- D. suspensa (Alexander, 1933)
- D. swezeyana (Alexander, 1942)
- D. swezeyi Alexander, 1919
- D. synclera Alexander, 1927
- D. tahanensis Edwards, 1928
- D. takeuchii Alexander, 1922
- D. tamsi (Edwards, 1934)
- D. tapleyi Alexander, 1924
- D. tarsalba Alexander, 1922
- D. teinoterga (Alexander, 1967)
- D. tenebrosa Edwards, 1923
- D. tenuiclava (Alexander, 1932)
- D. tenuicula (Alexander, 1929)
- D. tenuifilamentosa (Alexander, 1945)
- D. terebrina Alexander, 1921
- D. terraenovae Alexander, 1920
- D. tessulata (Savchenko, 1974)
- D. thamyris (Alexander, 1950)
- D. thetica (Alexander, 1932)
- D. thixis (Alexander, 1967)
- D. tinctipennis de Meijere, 1916
- D. tipulipes Karsch, 1886
- D. titicacana (Alexander, 1945)
- D. tongensis (Alexander, 1978)
- D. torpida (Alexander, 1948)
- D. torrens Alexander, 1923
- D. torulosa (Alexander, 1968)
- D. transfuga (Alexander, 1935)
- D. tremula (Alexander, 1931)
- D. tricholabis Edwards, 1926
- D. tricuspidata (Alexander, 1936)
- D. tricuspis Alexander, 1923
- D. trifilamentosa (Alexander, 1932)
- D. trilobifera (Alexander, 1967)
- D. trilobula (Alexander, 1958)
- D. trinitatis (Alexander, 1931)
- D. trispinula (Alexander, 1933)
- D. tristigmata Alexander, 1925
- D. tristina (Alexander, 1930)
- D. trituberculata (Alexander, 1929)
- D. troglophila (Alexander, 1929)
- D. tyrranica (Alexander, 1964)
- D. uinta (Alexander, 1948)
- D. umbonis (Alexander, 1964)
- D. umkomazanae (Alexander, 1956)
- D. ungjeeburra (Theischinger, 1994)
- D. unicinctifera (Alexander, 1930)
- D. unispinosa Alexander, 1921
- D. upoluensis Edwards, 1928
- D. ushas (Alexander, 1965)
- D. vaccha (Alexander, 1966)
- D. validistyla (Alexander, 1933)
- D. vamana (Alexander, 1952)
- D. variabilis Grimshaw, 1901
- D. variispina Alexander, 1924
- D. varsha (Alexander, 1967)
- D. veda (Alexander, 1966)
- D. venatrix (Alexander, 1952)
- D. veneris (Alexander, 1952)
- D. ventralis (Schummel, 1829)
- D. venusta Bergroth, 1888
- D. venustior (Alexander, 1950)
- D. veternosa (Alexander, 1935)
- D. viator (Alexander, 1960)
- D. vicarians (Schiner, 1868)
- D. vicina (Macquart, 1839)
- D. villaricae (Alexander, 1929)
- D. virilis Alexander, 1916
- D. vulgata Bergroth, 1888
- D. waitakeriae (Alexander, 1952)
- D. walleyi (Alexander, 1943)
- D. wattamolla (Theischinger, 1994)
- D. weiseriana (Alexander, 1929)
- D. weschei Edwards, 1923
- D. whiteae (Alexander, 1941)
- D. whitei Alexander, 1921
- D. wilfredi (Alexander, 1952)
- D. willamettensis (Alexander, 1949)
- D. williamsae (Theischinger, 1994)
- D. wiseana (Alexander, 1956)
- D. woggoon (Theischinger, 1994)
- D. wundurra (Theischinger, 1994)
- D. yaksha (Alexander, 1964)
- D. yerrawar (Theischinger, 1994)
- D. yoganidra (Alexander, 1967)
- D. ypsilon (Alexander, 1959)
- D. yunqueana (Alexander, 1952)
- D. zernyi Lackschewitz, 1928
- D. zonata Skuse, 1890

Subgenus Doaneomyia Alexander, 1921

- D. altitarsis (Edwards, 1927)
- D. caledoniensis (Alexander, 1948)
- D. deprivata (Alexander, 1948)
- D. fijicola (Alexander, 1953)
- D. pampangensis (Alexander, 1931)
- D. tahitiensis (Alexander, 1921)

Subgenus Erostrata Savchenko, 1976

- D. canis (Alexander, 1931)
- D. cnephosa (Alexander, 1959)
- D. cynotis (Alexander, 1931)
- D. globithorax Osten Sacken, 1869
- D. melas (Alexander, 1934)
- D. tabashii (Alexander, 1934)

Subgenus Euglochina Alexander, 1921

- D. arachnobia (Alexander, 1929)
- D. bulbibasis (Alexander, 1972)
- D. captiosa (Alexander, 1932)
- D. comoroensis (Alexander, 1959)
- D. connectans Alexander, 1920
- D. curtata (Alexander, 1935)
- D. curtivena Alexander, 1922
- D. dignitosa (Alexander, 1931)
- D. dravidica (Alexander, 1951)
- D. fuscibasis Alexander, 1922
- D. invocata (Alexander, 1948)
- D. novaeguineae de Meijere, 1915
- D. okinawensis Alexander, 1925
- D. projecta (Alexander, 1929)
- D. saltens (Doleschall, 1857)
- D. silens (Alexander, 1948)

Subgenus Glochina Meigen, 1830

- D. bangerteri (Mendl, 1974)
- D. basifusca Alexander, 1919
- D. brevispina Savchenko, 1976
- D. cretica Mendl, 1979
- D. hansiana Stary & Geiger, 1985
- D. illingworthi Alexander, 1914
- D. kaszabi (Mannheims & Savchenko, 1973)
- D. kinensis (Alexander, 1936)
- D. liberta Osten Sacken, 1860
- D. mediterranea Lackschewitz, 1942
- D. pauli Geiger, 1983
- D. perobtusa (Alexander, 1945)
- D. persordida Savchenko, 1976
- D. schineriana (Alexander, 1964)
- D. sericata (Meigen, 1830)
- D. sordida brevicula (Alexander, 1934)
- D. sordida sordida Brunetti, 1912
- D. sordidipennis (Alexander, 1940)
- D. staryi Geiger & Mendl, 1994
- D. transsilvanica Lackschewitz, 1928
- D. tristis (Schummel, 1829)
- D. tristoides (Alexander, 1929)

Subgenus Hesperolimonia Alexander, 1966

- D. infuscata Doane, 1900

Subgenus Idioglochina Alexander, 1921

- D. allani (Alexander, 1959)
- D. ambrosiana (Alexander, 1962)
- D. australiensis Alexander, 1922
- D. bioculata (de Meijere, 1916)
- D. chlorella (Alexander, 1978)
- D. corallicola (Alexander, 1956)
- D. debeauforti de Meijere, 1913
- D. flavalis (Alexander, 1934)
- D. fumipennis (Butler, 1875)
- D. kotoshoensis Alexander, 1923
- D. kronei Mik, 1881
- D. latibasis (Alexander, 1967)
- D. lightfooti Alexander, 1917
- D. marmorata Osten Sacken, 1861
- D. medidorsalis (Tokunaga, 1936)
- D. obesula Edwards, 1927
- D. pacifica (Tokunaga, 1935)
- D. parvimacula Edwards, 1927
- D. perkinsiana (Alexander, 1930)
- D. porteri Alexander, 1919
- D. tokara (Nobuchi, 1955)
- D. tokunagai (Alexander, 1932)
- D. tokunagana (Alexander, 1964)
- D. tusitala (Alexander, 1921)
- D. vilae Edwards, 1927

Subgenus Idiopyga Savchenko, 1987

- D. alpina Bangerter, 1948
- D. ctenopyga (Alexander, 1943)
- D. danica Kuntze, 1919
- D. esbeni (Nielsen, 1940)
- D. flabellifera Byers & Rossman, 2008
- D. grahamiana (Alexander, 1933)
- D. halterella Edwards, 1921
- D. intricata Alexander, 1927
- D. klefbecki (Tjeder, 1941)
- D. lackschewitzi Edwards, 1928
- D. lulensis (Tjeder, 1969)
- D. magnicauda Lundstrom, 1912
- D. megacauda Alexander, 1924
- D. melleicauda Alexander, 1917
- D. murina (Zetterstedt, 1851)
- D. nigristigma Nielsen, 1919
- D. piscataquis (Alexander, 1941)
- D. ponojensis Lundstrom, 1912
- D. retrograda (Alexander, 1941)
- D. sternolobata (Alexander, 1936)
- D. stigmatica (Meigen, 1830)
- D. tseni (Alexander, 1938)
- D. violovitshi Savchenko, 1974

Subgenus Melanolimonia Alexander, 1965

- D. aurita (Alexander, 1929)
- D. azorica (Nielsen, 1963)
- D. benguetensis (Alexander, 1931)
- D. caledonica Edwards, 1926
- D. emodi (Alexander, 1960)
- D. evexa (Alexander, 1967)
- D. fulvomorio (Edwards, 1933)
- D. fulvonigrina (Alexander, 1965)
- D. hamata Becker, 1908
- D. kansuensis (Alexander, 1930)
- D. kongosana (Alexander, 1934)
- D. lakshmi (Alexander, 1958)
- D. latemarginata (Alexander, 1972)
- D. monkhtuyae Podenas & Gelhaus, 2001
- D. morio (Fabricius, 1787)
- D. morioides Osten Sacken, 1860
- D. moronis (Alexander, 1932)
- D. neomorio Alexander, 1927
- D. nesomorio Alexander, 1928
- D. nigrithorax Brunetti, 1912
- D. nitidithorax Senior-White, 1922
- D. nycteris Alexander, 1927
- D. occidua Edwards, 1926
- D. pacifera (Alexander, 1937)
- D. paramorio Alexander, 1926
- D. parviloba (Alexander, 1940)
- D. parvincisa (Alexander, 1940)
- D. penita (Alexander, 1936)
- D. pernigrita (Alexander, 1965)
- D. priapula (Alexander, 1966)
- D. pseudomorio Alexander, 1920
- D. rhadinostyla (Alexander, 1967)
- D. rufiventris (Strobl, 1900)
- D. spinifera Alexander, 1927
- D. stylifera Lackschewitz, 1928
- D. subaurita (Alexander, 1938)
- D. submorio Alexander, 1920
- D. tergotruncata (Alexander, 1966)

Subgenus Nealexandriaria Alexander, 1967

- D. anisota (Alexander, 1973)
- D. argyrata (Alexander, 1929)
- D. atayal (Alexander, 1929)
- D. atromaculata Edwards, 1928
- D. brevissima Alexander, 1925
- D. carneotincta Alexander, 1915
- D. cinereicapilla (Alexander, 1934)
- D. conveniens (Walker, 1848)
- D. diengana (Alexander, 1931)
- D. frontina (Edwards, 1933)
- D. fulvicolor (Alexander, 1973)
- D. injucunda (Alexander, 1967)
- D. ludmilla (Theischinger, 1994)
- D. milkurli (Theischinger, 1994)
- D. nathalinae (Alexander, 1932)
- D. nigroephippiata (Alexander, 1952)
- D. ochricapilla (Alexander, 1956)
- D. prominens Brunetti, 1918
- D. scolopia (Alexander, 1971)
- D. semirufa Edwards, 1927
- D. simplissima Alexander, 1915
- D. sollicita (Alexander, 1931)
- D. tecta (Alexander, 1932)
- D. tenella de Meijere, 1911
- D. unibrunnea (Alexander, 1945)

Subgenus Neoglochina Alexander, 1967

- D. aurigena (Alexander, 1944)
- D. capnora Alexander, 1921
- D. curraniana (Alexander, 1944)
- D. esau (Alexander, 1947)
- D. felix (Alexander, 1950)
- D. fumosa (Alexander, 1912)
- D. grossa (Alexander, 1938)
- D. imperturbata (Alexander, 1951)
- D. infucata (Alexander, 1927)
- D. ingens (Alexander, 1945)
- D. insulicola Oosterbroek, 2009.
- D. leucoscelis (Alexander, 1950)
- D. limbinervis (Alexander, 1941)
- D. lutzi (Alexander, 1912)
- D. mesotricha (Alexander, 1944)
- D. moniligera (Alexander, 1967)
- D. multisignata (Alexander, 1936)
- D. pernobilis (Alexander, 1941)
- D. praeclara (Alexander, 1928)
- D. sciasma (Alexander, 1950)
- D. trialbocincta (Alexander, 1941)

Subgenus Neolimnobia Alexander, 1928

- D. anthracopoda (Alexander, 1938)
- D. archangelica (Alexander, 1942)
- D. corallina (Alexander, 1938)
- D. diva (Schiner, 1868)
- D. excelsior (Alexander, 1944)
- D. hypocrita (Alexander, 1935)
- D. immaculipes (Alexander, 1935)
- D. latiorflava (Alexander, 1979)
- D. muscosa Enderlein, 1912
- D. pugilis (Alexander, 1943)
- D. stygicornis (Alexander, 1962)
- D. tricincta Alexander, 1913

Subgenus Nesciomyia Theischinger, 1994

- D. durroon (Theischinger, 1994)

Subgenus Numantia Bigot, 1854

- D. fusca (Meigen, 1804)

Subgenus Pandamyia Theischinger, 1994

- D. nowankareena (Theischinger, 1994)
- D. uckillya (Theischinger, 1994)

Subgenus Peripheroptera Schiner, 1868

- D. aberrans (Schiner, 1868)
- D. angustifasciata (Alexander, 1922)
- D. arcuata (Alexander, 1913)
- D. atrosignata (Alexander, 1934)
- D. auranticolor (Alexander, 1978)
- D. austroandina (Alexander, 1929)
- D. cochabambae (Alexander, 1945)
- D. croceibasis (Alexander, 1942)
- D. cynara (Alexander, 1942)
- D. dis (Alexander, 1944)
- D. eudorae (Alexander, 1913)
- D. euryptera (Alexander, 1953)
- D. fulvistigma (Alexander, 1953)
- D. fumibasalis (Alexander, 1937)
- D. fuscoanalis (Alexander, 1979)
- D. glochinoides (Alexander, 1922)
- D. incommoda (Osten Sacken, 1888)
- D. incommodes (Alexander, 1928)
- D. lankesteri (Alexander, 1946)
- D. lichyella (Alexander, 1947)
- D. lissomelania (Alexander, 1967)
- D. machupichuana (Alexander, 1953)
- D. morgana (Alexander, 1944)
- D. nearcuata (Alexander, 1940)
- D. nitens (Schiner, 1868)
- D. ordinaria (Alexander, 1945)
- D. parvistigmata (Alexander, 1980)
- D. peramoena (Alexander, 1945)
- D. perdelecta (Alexander, 1940)
- D. prindlei (Alexander, 1938)
- D. rediviva (Alexander, 1942)
- D. rhoda (Alexander, 1939)
- D. schineri (Osten Sacken, 1888)
- D. subamoena (Alexander, 1942)
- D. teucholaboides (Alexander, 1913)
- D. thioptera (Alexander, 1941)
- D. trimelania (Alexander, 1942)
- D. trinigrina (Alexander, 1940)
- D. vivasberthieri (Alexander, 1940)

Subgenus Pseudoglochina Alexander, 1921

- D. angustapicalis (Alexander, 1931)
- D. apicialba (Alexander, 1965)
- D. bicinctipes Brunetti, 1912
- D. bilatior (Alexander, 1932)
- D. bilatissima (Alexander, 1932)
- D. biluteola (Alexander, 1950)
- D. bryophila (Alexander, 1934)
- D. dimelania (Alexander, 1935)
- D. eurymelania (Alexander, 1965)
- D. evanescens (Alexander, 1936)
- D. fuscolata (Alexander, 1936)
- D. hoskingi (Alexander, 1935)
- D. kobusi de Meijere, 1904
- D. laticincta (Edwards, 1928)
- D. microneura (Alexander, 1948)
- D. monocycla (Alexander, 1935)
- D. pamela (Alexander, 1960)
- D. periscelis (Alexander, 1958)
- D. pictipes Brunetti, 1918
- D. ponapensis (Alexander, 1940)
- D. procella (Alexander, 1936)
- D. pulchripes (Alexander, 1920)
- D. querula (Alexander, 1937)
- D. riukiuensis (Alexander, 1929)
- D. unicinctipes (Alexander, 1929)

Subgenus Sivalimnobia Alexander, 1963

- D. alticola Edwards, 1916
- D. approximata Brunetti, 1912
- D. aquosa Verrall, 1886
- D. bicolor Brunetti, 1918
- D. clavula (Alexander, 1972)
- D. euphileta (Alexander, 1924)
- D. excelsa Alexander, 1915
- D. fortis Brunetti, 1912
- D. kali (Alexander, 1963)
- D. marginella (Alexander, 1929)
- D. nongkodjadjarensis de Meijere, 1913
- D. pererratica (Alexander, 1973)
- D. pleiades (Alexander, 1931)
- D. rahula (Alexander, 1963)
- D. uma (Alexander, 1967)

Subgenus Zalusa Enderlein, 1906

- D. falklandica (Enderlein, 1906)

Subgenus Zelandoglochina Alexander, 1924

- D. angelica (Alexander, 1929)
- D. aphanta (Alexander, 1929)
- D. atrovittata Alexander, 1922
- D. bigoti (Alexander, 1913)
- D. canterburiana Alexander, 1923
- D. circularis Alexander, 1924
- D. crassipes Edwards, 1923
- D. cubitalis Edwards, 1923
- D. decincta Edwards, 1923
- D. fagetorum (Alexander, 1929)
- D. flabellifera (Alexander, 1929)
- D. flavidipennis Edwards, 1923
- D. harrisi Alexander, 1923
- D. huttoni Edwards, 1923
- D. laterospina Alexander, 1924
- D. melanogramma Edwards, 1923
- D. miniata (Alexander, 1929)
- D. multiarmata (Alexander, 1929)
- D. multinodosa (Alexander, 1929)
- D. myersi Alexander, 1924
- D. nodulifera (Alexander, 1929)
- D. nubleana (Alexander, 1971)
- D. octava Edwards, 1923
- D. ofella (Alexander, 1953)
- D. omissistyla (Alexander, 1929)
- D. paradisea Alexander, 1923
- D. parvispinosa (Alexander, 1929)
- D. pervincta (Alexander, 1936)
- D. pilosipennis (Alexander, 1929)
- D. setulipennis (Alexander, 1929)
- D. sublacteata Edwards, 1923
- D. tehuelche (Alexander, 1929)
- D. tenuipalpis (Alexander, 1929)
- D. torticornis (Alexander, 1929)
- D. unicornis Alexander, 1923
- D. unijuga Alexander, 1923

Uncertain Placement

- D. erythrina Alexander, 1915
- D. nelliana Alexander, 1914
- D. scutellumnigrum Alexander, 1920
- D. tamarae Alexander, 1919
