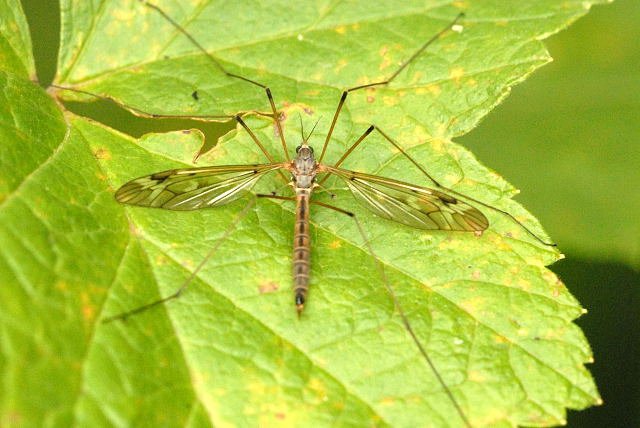
- Tipula unca male

Scientific classification
- Kingdom: Animalia
- Phylum: Arthropoda
- Clade: Pancrustacea
- Class: Insecta
- Order: Diptera
- Family: Tipulidae
- Genus: Tipula
- Subgenus: Beringotipula
- Species: T. unca

Binomial name
- Tipula unca Wiedemann, 1833

Synonyms
- Tipula hortensis Meigen, 1818; Tipula longicornis Schummel, 1833

= Tipula unca =

Species of fly

Tipula unca is a species of cranefly.

== Distribution ==
Palaearctic.

== Description ==
See

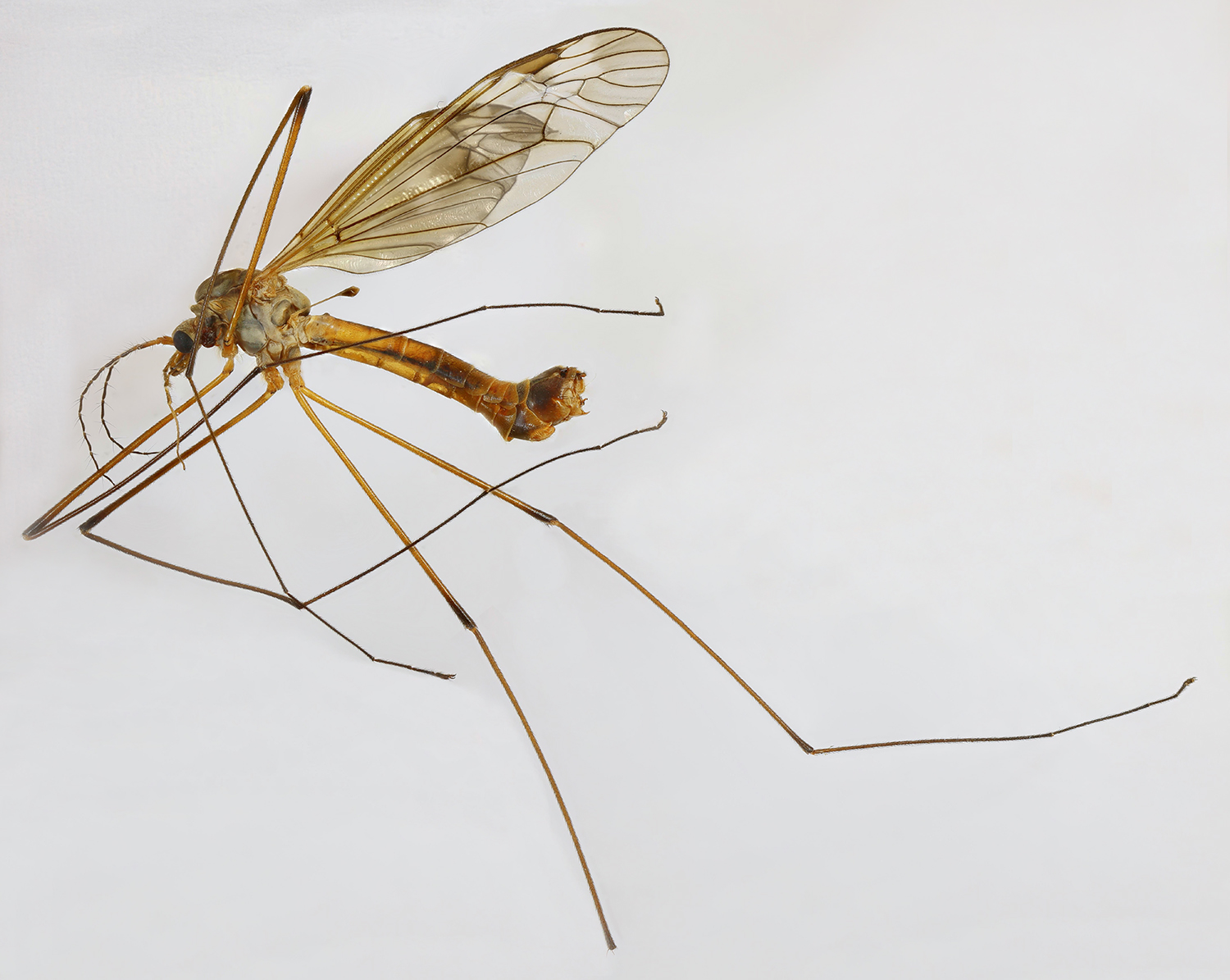
