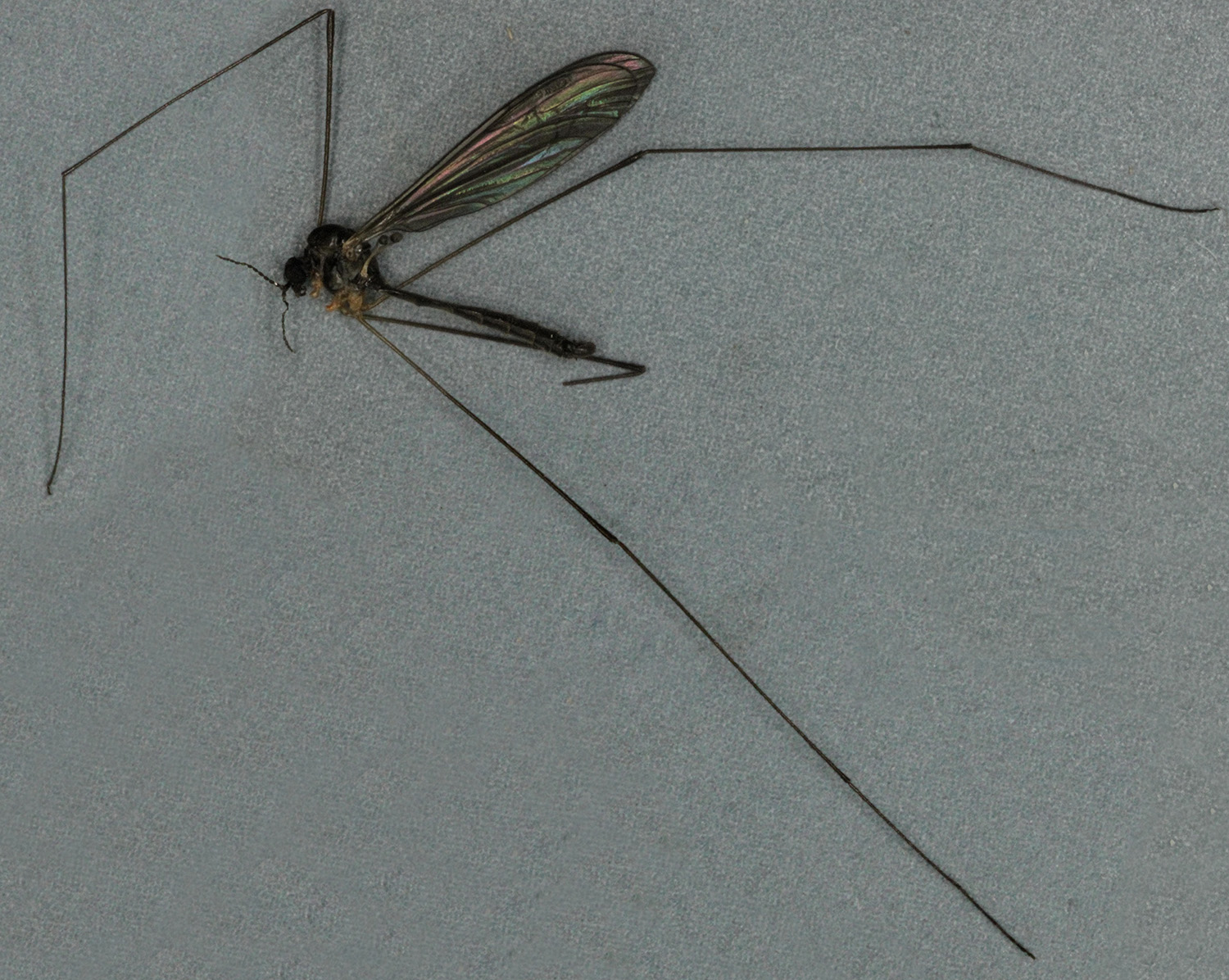
- Dicranomyia fusca North Wales

Scientific classification
- Kingdom: Animalia
- Phylum: Arthropoda
- Clade: Pancrustacea
- Class: Insecta
- Order: Diptera
- Family: Limoniidae
- Genus: Dicranomyia
- Species: D. fusca

Binomial name
- Dicranomyia fusca Meigen, 1804

= Dicranomyia fusca =

Species of fly

Dicranomyia fusca is a species of fly in the family Limoniidae. It is found in the Palearctic.
