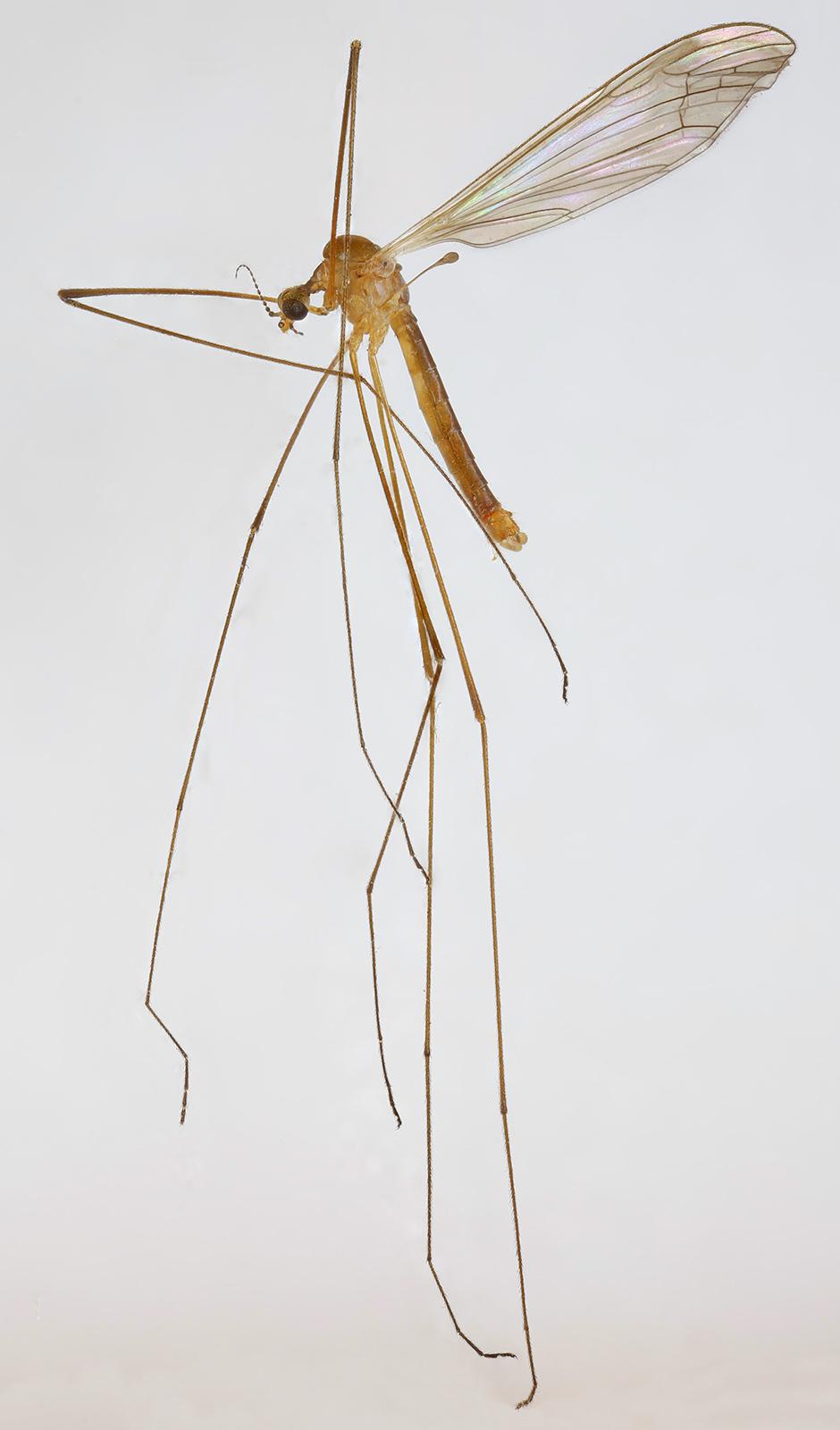
- Dicranomyia modesta North Wales

Scientific classification
- Kingdom: Animalia
- Phylum: Arthropoda
- Clade: Pancrustacea
- Class: Insecta
- Order: Diptera
- Family: Limoniidae
- Genus: Dicranomyia
- Species: D. modesta

Binomial name
- Dicranomyia modesta (Meigen, 1818)

= Dicranomyia modesta =

Species of fly

Dicranomyia modesta is a species of fly in the family Limoniidae. It is found in the Palearctic.
