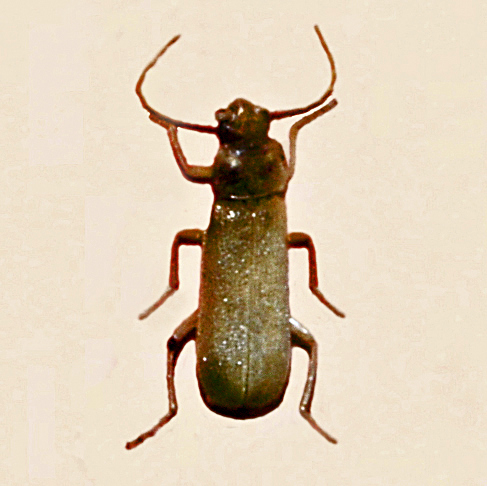
- Cratosilis laeta. Museum specimen

Scientific classification
- Kingdom: Animalia
- Phylum: Arthropoda
- Class: Insecta
- Order: Coleoptera
- Suborder: Polyphaga
- Infraorder: Elateriformia
- Family: Cantharidae
- Genus: Cratosilis
- Species: C. laeta

Binomial name
- Cratosilis laeta (Fabricius 1792)

Synonyms
- Cratosilis semiobscura Pic, 1901; Rhagonycha discolor Baudi, 1873

= Cratosilis laeta =

Species of beetle

Cratosilis laeta is a species of soldier beetle belonging to the family Cantharidae.

== Description ==
Cratosilis laeta can reach a length of 6–7 millimetres (0.24–0.28 in). These small insects have a black head and a reddish pronotum, while elytrae are brownish with black bands.

== Distribution ==
This species can be found in Italy and Switzerland.
