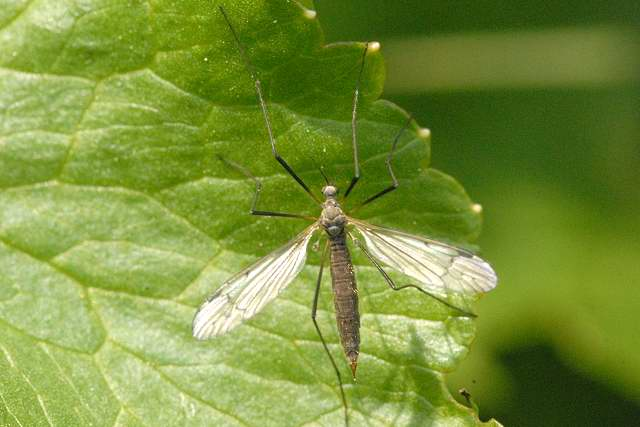

Scientific classification
- Kingdom: Animalia
- Phylum: Arthropoda
- Class: Insecta
- Order: Diptera
- Family: Limoniidae
- Genus: Phylidorea
- Species: P. squalens

Binomial name
- Phylidorea squalens (Zetterstedt, 1838)

= Phylidorea squalens =

Species of fly

Phylidorea squalens is a species of cranefly in the family Limoniidae
