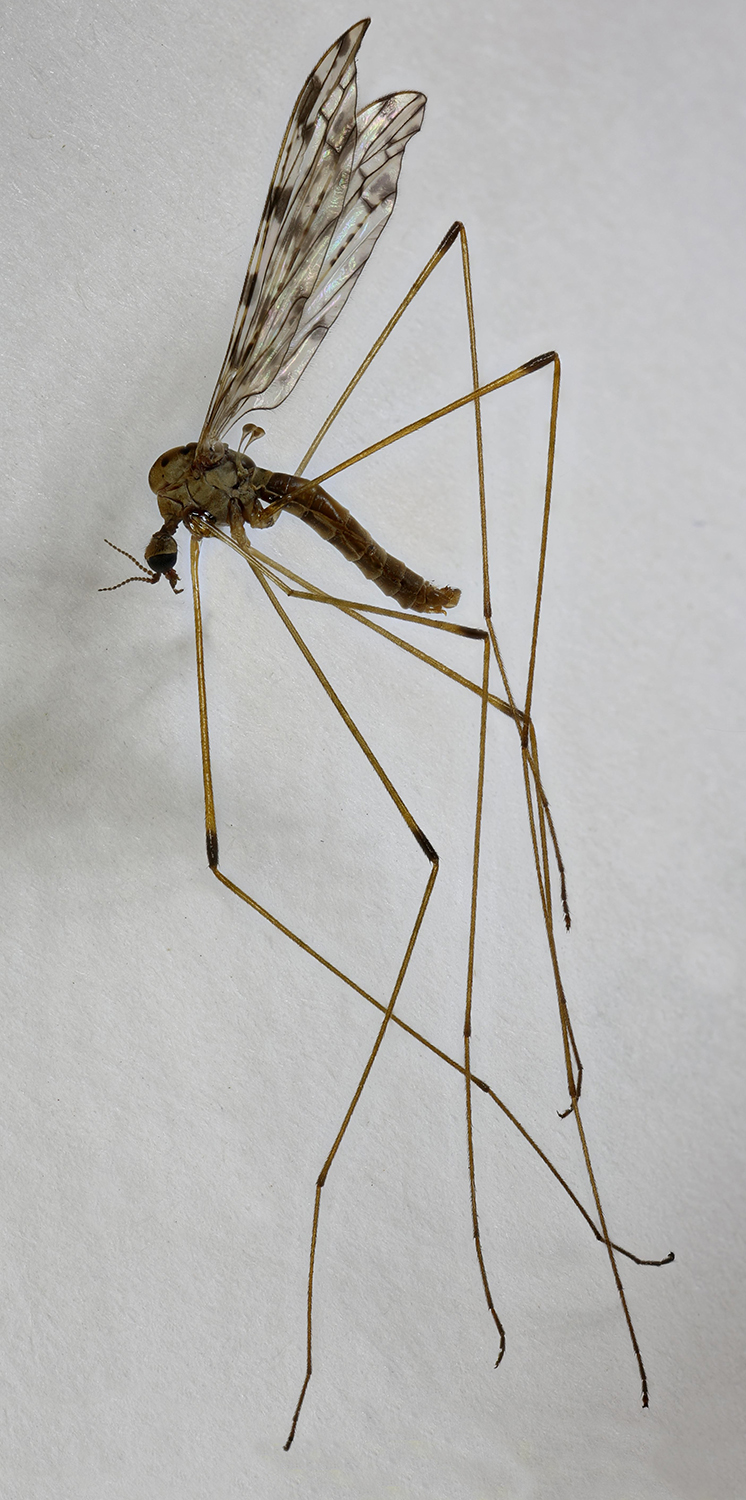
- Dicranomyia goritiensis North Wales

Scientific classification
- Kingdom: Animalia
- Phylum: Arthropoda
- Clade: Pancrustacea
- Class: Insecta
- Order: Diptera
- Family: Limoniidae
- Genus: Dicranomyia
- Species: D. goritiensis

Binomial name
- Dicranomyia goritiensis (Mik, 1864)

= Dicranomyia goritiensis =

Species of fly

Dicranomyia goritiensis is a species of fly in the family Limoniidae. It is found in the Palearctic.
