= Hammerschmidtia sedmani =

Scientific classification
- Kingdom: Animalia
- Phylum: Arthropoda
- Class: Insecta
- Order: Diptera
- Family: Syrphidae
- Genus: Hammerschmidtia
- Species: H. sedmani

Binomial name
- Hammerschmidtia sedmani Vockeroth, Moran & Skevington, 2019

Species of hoverfly

Hammerschmidtia sedmani, the pale-bristled logsitter, is an uncommon species of syrphid fly observed in North America. Larvae are found under bark of recently fallen aspen.
