= Dicranomyia veda =

Dicranomyia (Dicranomyia) veda

Scientific classification
- Domain: Eukaryota
- Kingdom: Animalia
- Phylum: Arthropoda
- Class: Insecta
- Order: Diptera
- Family: Limoniidae
- Genus: Dicranomyia
- Species: D. veda

Binomial name
- Dicranomyia veda Alexander, 1966

Species of fly

Dicranomyia (Dicranomyia) veda is a species of fly from the family Limoniidae. This species is native to the Indomalayan realm.
