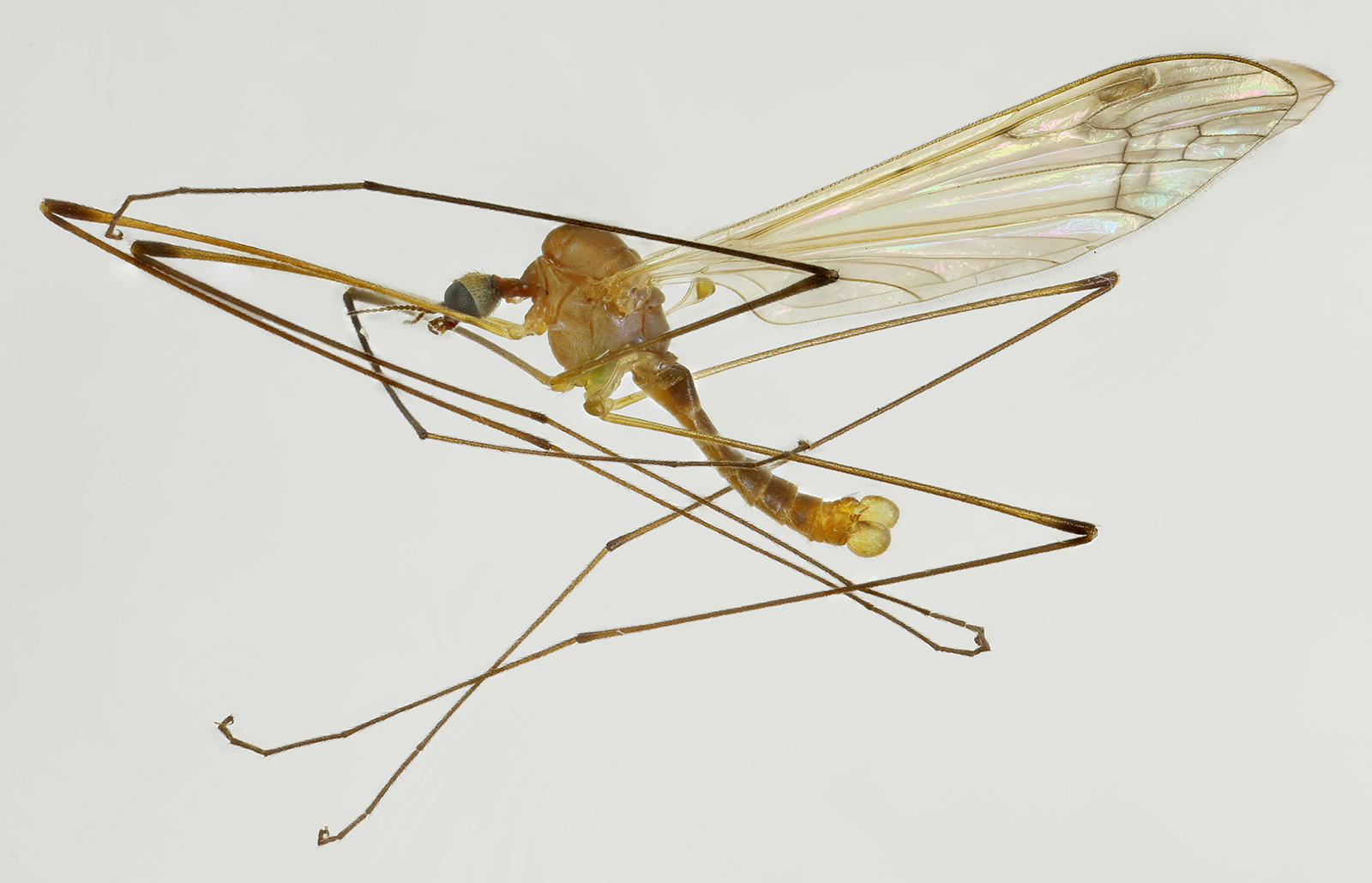
- Dicranomyia chorea North Wales

Scientific classification
- Kingdom: Animalia
- Phylum: Arthropoda
- Clade: Pancrustacea
- Class: Insecta
- Order: Diptera
- Family: Limoniidae
- Genus: Dicranomyia
- Species: D. chorea

Binomial name
- Dicranomyia chorea (Meigen, 1818)

Synonyms
- Limnobia chorea Meigen, 1818 Limonia lutea Meigen, 1804 Dicranomyia flavicollis Becker, 1908 Dicranomyia longipes Santos Abreu, 1923 Dicranomyia vidua Santos Abreu, 1923 Dicranomyia grisescens Lackschewitz, 1928 Dicranomyia lutescens Lackschewitz, 1928

= Dicranomyia chorea =

Species of fly

Dicranomyia chorea is a Palearctic species of cranefly in the family Limoniidae. It is found in a wide range of habitats and micro habitats: in earth rich in humus, in swamps and marshes, in leaf litter and in wet spots in woods.
