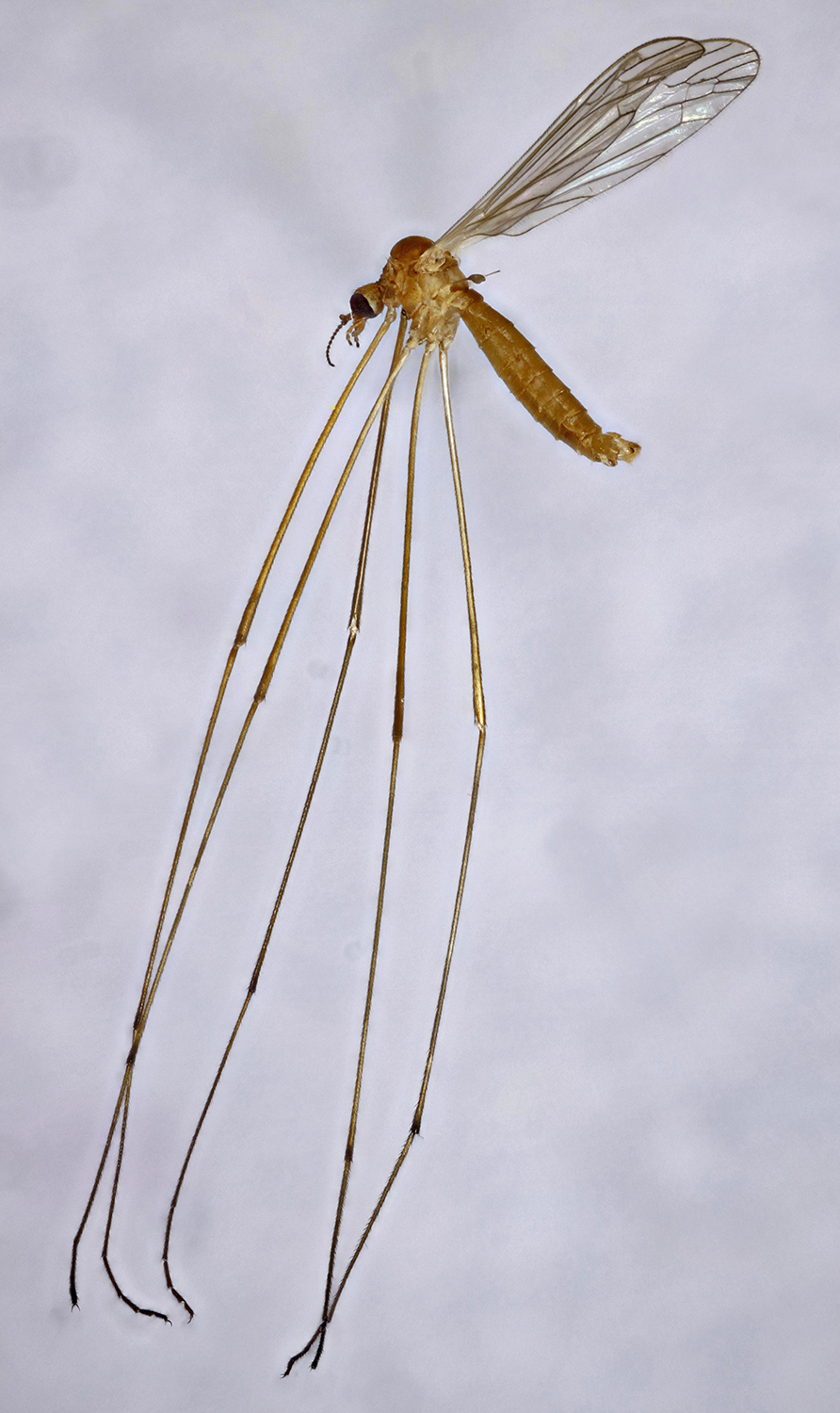
- Dicranomyia sera North Wales

Scientific classification
- Kingdom: Animalia
- Phylum: Arthropoda
- Clade: Pancrustacea
- Class: Insecta
- Order: Diptera
- Family: Limoniidae
- Genus: Dicranomyia
- Species: D. sera

Binomial name
- Dicranomyia sera (Walker, 1848)

= Dicranomyia sera =

Species of fly

Dicranomyia sera is a species of fly in the family Limoniidae. It is found in the Palearctic.
