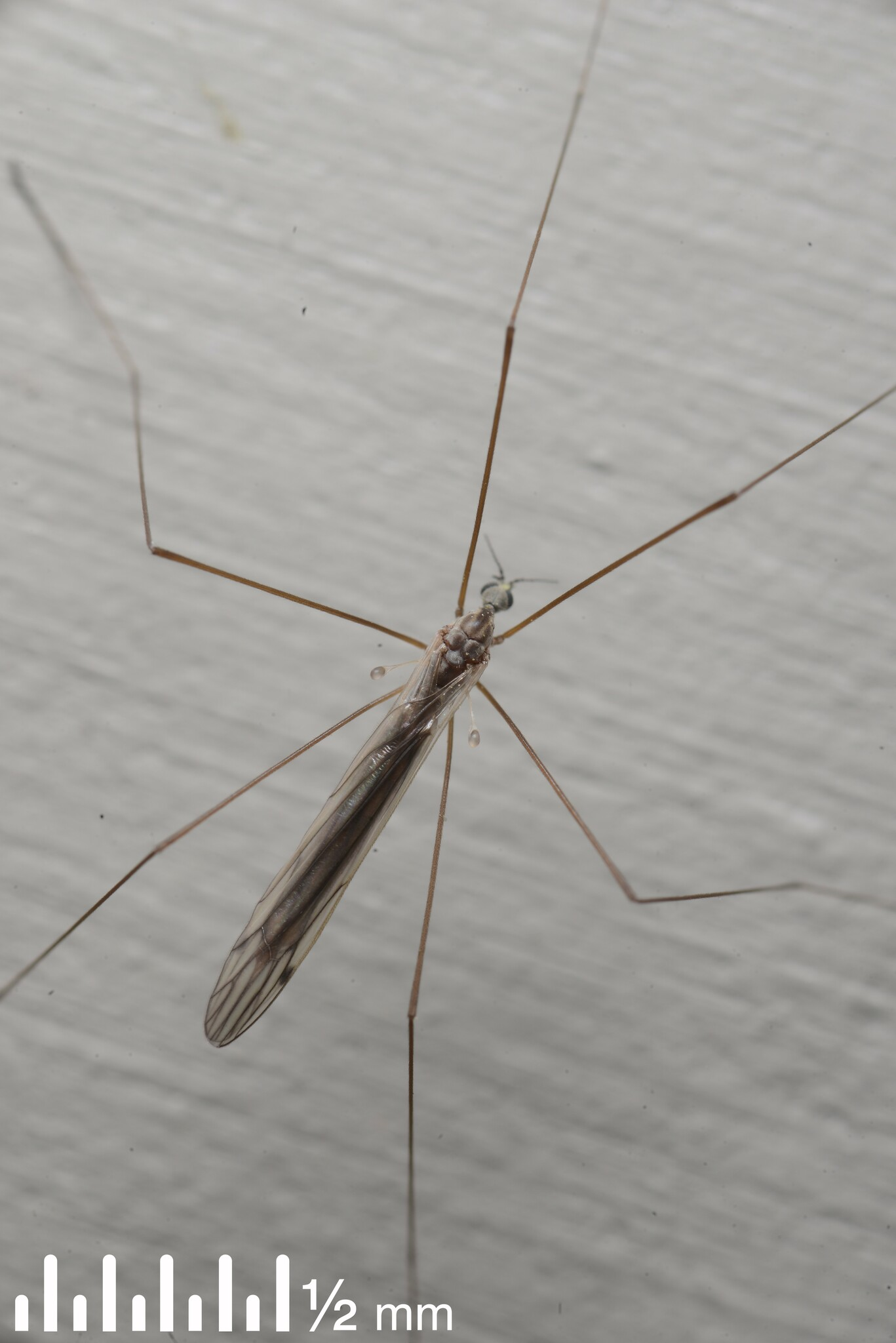

Scientific classification
- Kingdom: Animalia
- Phylum: Arthropoda
- Class: Insecta
- Order: Diptera
- Family: Limoniidae
- Genus: Dicranomyia
- Species: D. aegrotans

Binomial name
- Dicranomyia aegrotans (Edwards, 1923)

= Dicranomyia aegrotans =

Species of fly

Dicranomyia aegrotans is a species of crane fly in the family Limoniidae. It is endemic to New Zealand.

== Taxonomy ==
The species was first mentioned by Francis Walker in 1848, naming the species Limnobia aegrotans but not providing a sufficient description. In 1924, Charles Paul Alexander described the males of the species. The species has also been described as Limonia (Dicranomyia) aegrotans.

== Description ==
Edwards described the species as follows:

♀. Head heavily dusted with light ash-grey; front apparently about one-fifth as broad as head. Proboscis and palpi dark-brown, about half as long as head. First antennal joint grey-dusted, remainder blackish; flagellar joints rounded, the last six or seven shortly oval; verticils slightly longer than joints. Thorax brown, heavily dusted with pale grey; praescutum with three stripes of brown ground-colour. Abdomen dark brown, last segment and ovipositor reddish. Anal valves of ovipositor slender, curved, slightly shorter than last segment; genital valves somewhat narrowed on apical half. Legs rather light brown, tips of femora slightly darker. Wings rather narrow, with slight milky tint; base of wing and veins Sc and R white, the rest dark; Cu slightly clouded; stigma dark brown, small, roundish, bisected by the cross-vein. Sc1 ending slightly beyond the base of Rs, scarcely twice as long as Sc2, which is oblique. Rs gently curved, about twice as long as basal section of R4 + 5 and nearly two-thirds as long as R2 + 3. A distinct fold crossing the r-m cross-vein. Discal cell fully twice as long as broad, open to cell M1 on one wing. Halteres light ochreous.

The species body is 5 millimetres long, with a wing length of 6 millimetres.

== Distribution ==
The species is found widely across New Zealand, and in the Kermadec Islands.
