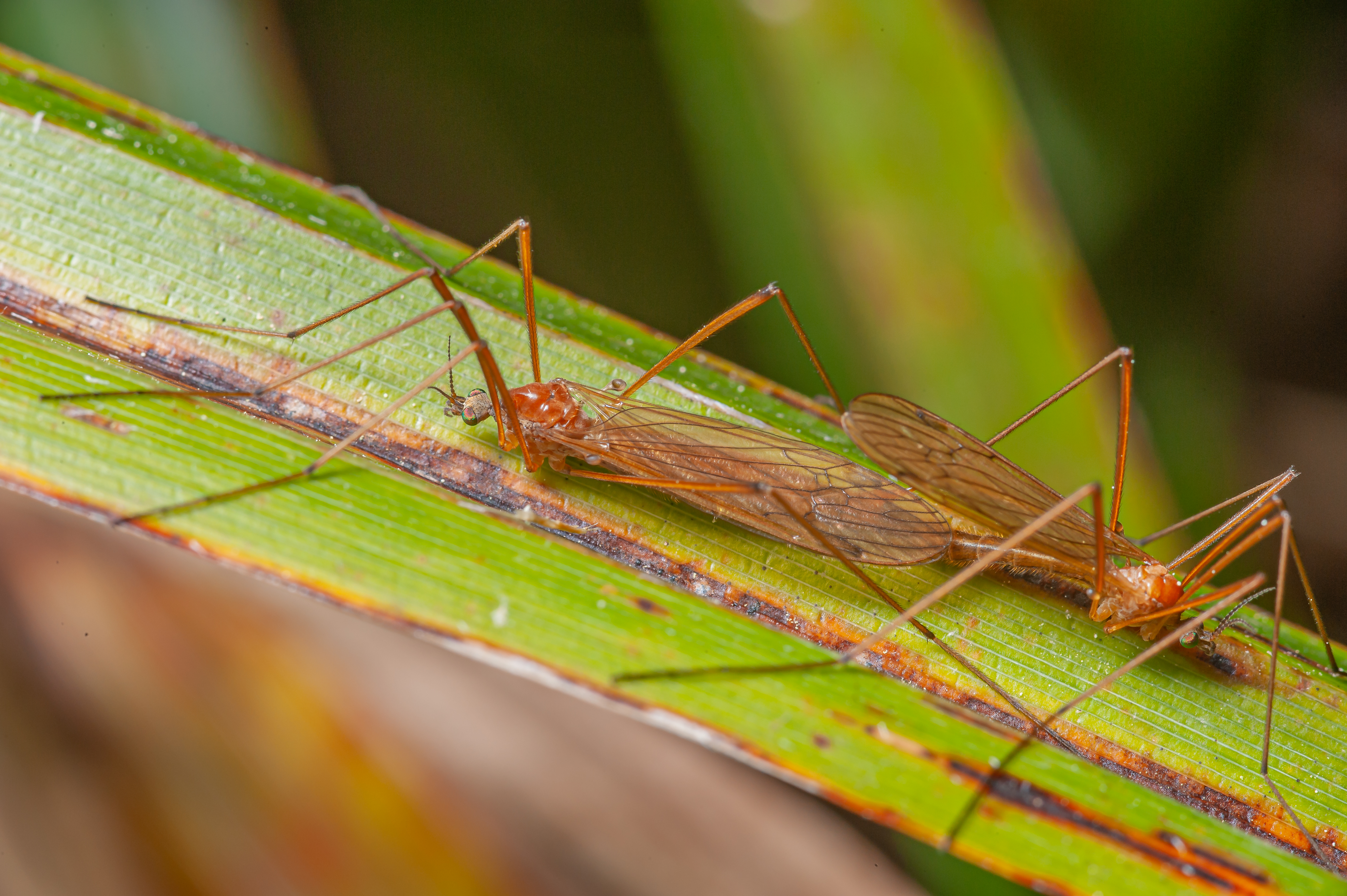

Scientific classification
- Kingdom: Animalia
- Phylum: Arthropoda
- Class: Insecta
- Order: Diptera
- Family: Limoniidae
- Genus: Phylidorea
- Species: P. ferruginea

Binomial name
- Phylidorea ferruginea (Meigen, 1818)

= Phylidorea ferruginea =

Species of fly

Phylidorea ferruginea is a Palearctic species of craneflies in the family Limoniidae.It is found in a wide range of habitats and micro habitats: in earth rich in humus, in swamps and marshes, in leaf litter and in wet spots in woods.
