= Basilewsky's cranefly =

Scientific classification
- Domain: Eukaryota
- Kingdom: Animalia
- Phylum: Arthropoda
- Class: Insecta
- Order: Diptera
- Family: Limoniidae
- Genus: Dicranomyia
- Species: D. basilewskyana

Binomial name
- Dicranomyia basilewskyana Alexander 1977

Species of fly

Basilewsky's cranefly (Dicranomyia basilewskyana) is an insect species. It was thought to be extinct for 50 years until 2016, when one landed on an entomologist driving a car in Saint Helena.
