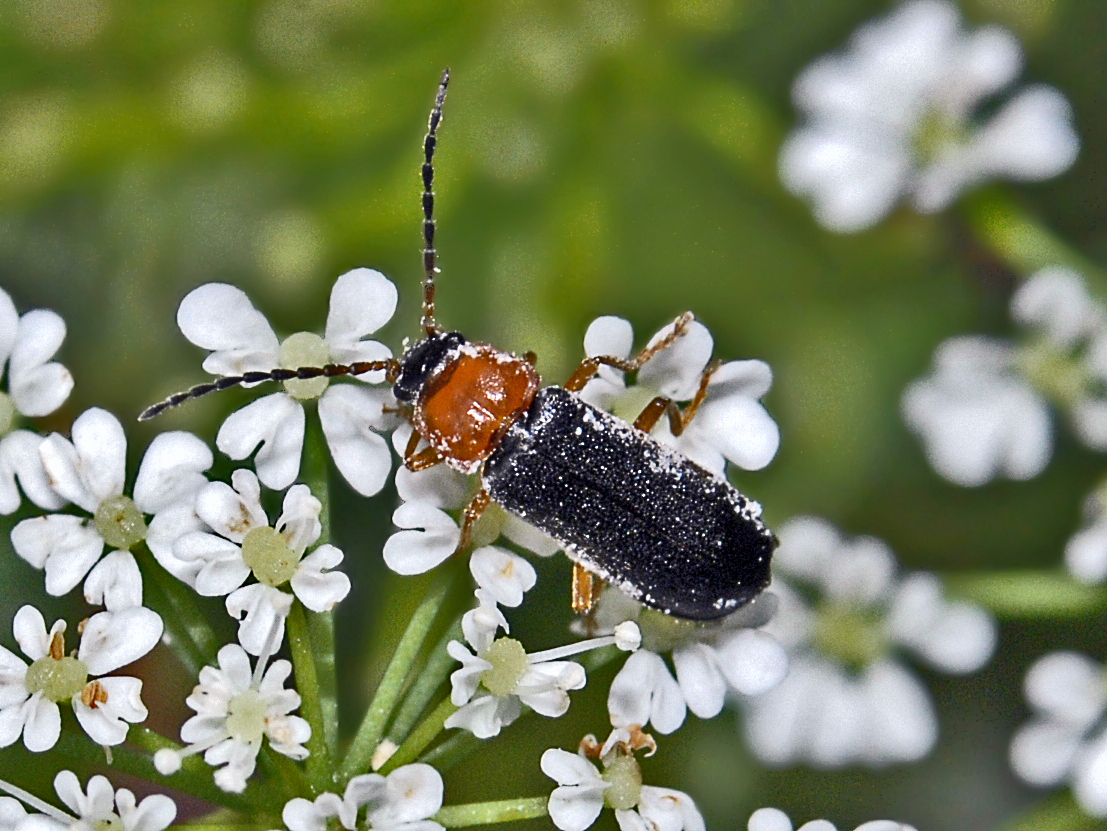
- Cratosilis denticollis

Scientific classification
- Kingdom: Animalia
- Phylum: Arthropoda
- Class: Insecta
- Order: Coleoptera
- Suborder: Polyphaga
- Infraorder: Elateriformia
- Family: Cantharidae
- Tribe: Cantharini
- Genus: Cratosilis; Motschulsky, 1860

= Cratosilis =

Genus of beetles

Cratosilis is a genus of soldier beetle belonging to the family Cantharidae.

Cratosilis include species with a radical metamorphosis and distinctive larval, pupal, and adult stages (Holometabola) during development. Larvae are radically different from the adults in their structure and behaviour.

== List of species ==
- Cratosilis denticollis (Schummel 1844)
- Cratosilis distinguenda (Baudi 1859)
- Cratosilis laeta (Fabricius 1792)
- Cratosilis sicula (Marseul 1864)
- Cratosilis theresae Pic 1901
