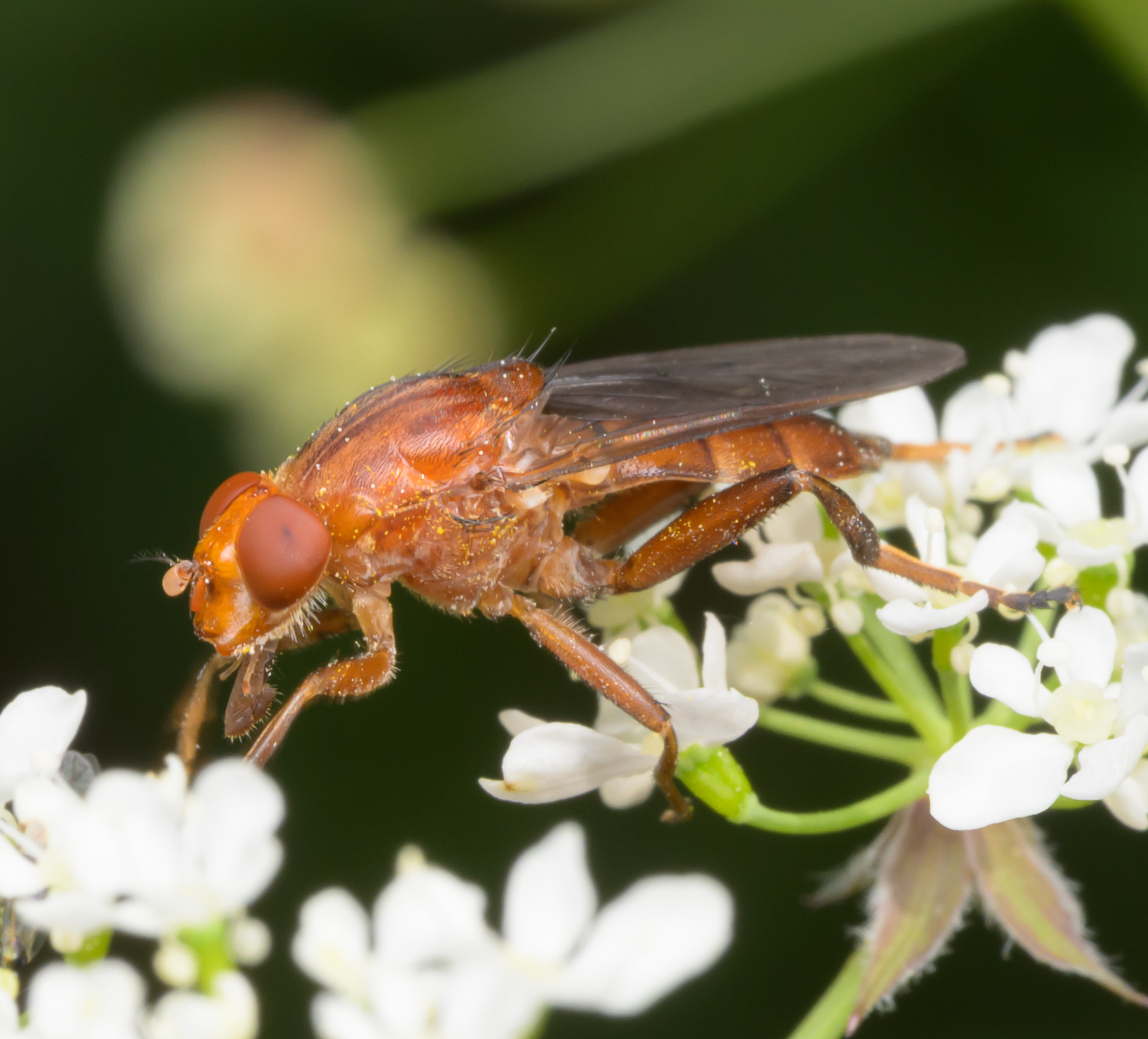

Scientific classification
- Kingdom: Animalia
- Phylum: Arthropoda
- Clade: Pancrustacea
- Class: Insecta
- Order: Diptera
- Family: Syrphidae
- Genus: Hammerschmidtia
- Species: H. ferruginea

Binomial name
- Hammerschmidtia ferruginea (Fallén, 1817)

Synonyms
- Eugeniamyia rufa; Rhingia ferruginea

= Hammerschmidtia ferruginea =

Species of hoverfly

Hammerschmidtia ferruginea , the Aspen hover fly, is a rare, species of syrphid fly. Hoverflies get their names from the ability to remain nearly motionless while in flight. The adults are also known as flower flies for they are commonly found around and on flowers, from which they get both energy-giving nectar and protein-rich pollen. Larvae for this genus are of the rat-tailed type. Hammerschmidtia ferruginea larvae have been described by Rotheray.

== Description ==
Hammerschmidtia ferruginea is a large (10–12 mm) orange-brown hoverfly with a feathered arista. It resembles Brachyopa and Hammerschmidtia was in the past a subgenus of Brachyopa. In general appearance it is more like a dryomyzid or sciomyzid than a syrphid. The larva is illustrated in colour by Rotheray.

== Distribution ==
Scotland east through Northern and Central Europe then to Central Asia, Siberia and on to the Pacific. In North America Alaska south to Arizona.

== Habitat ==
Pinus or Betula, and Quercus forest with overmature Populus tremula. It is a bioindicator.

== Biology ==
Adults may be found sitting on trunks of Betula and old Populus tremula, or on nearby logs and stumps. Flowers visited include white umbellifers, Crataegus, Ranunculus and Salix and choke cherry. They fly from the end of May until the end of July. .
