= Theodor Emil Schummel =

German entomologist (1786–1848)

Theodor Emil Schummel (23 May 1786, Breslau—24 February 1848) was a German botanist and entomologist who specialised in Diptera. Schummel was a private tutor in Breslau. He was a member of Schlesische Gesellschaft für vaterländische Cultur (Silesian Society for Patriotic Culture) a largely scientific society which received royal ratification in 1809 after the draft of its constitution was sent to the government in Königsberg and published many of his shorter scientific papers on insects in the society's journal Übersicht der Arbeiten und Veränderungen der Schlesischen Gesellschaft für Vaterländische Kultur, abbreviated Übers Arb. Ver. Schles. Ges. Vaterl. Kult.

== Works ==
Partial list

- 1829. Beschreibung der in Schlesien einheimischen Arten einiger Dipteren-Gattungen. 1. Limnobia. Meigen. Beitrage zur Entomologie, Breslau 1: 97-201 Monograph on Limoniidae.
- 1832. Versuch einer genauen Beschreibung der in Schlesien einheimischen Arten der Familie der Ruderwanzen Ploteres. 56 p., 4 pls. Monograph on Gerromorpha
- 1833. Versuch einer genauen Beschreibung der in Schlesien einheimischen Arten der Gattung Tipula. Meigen. Bachmukke. Beitrage zur Entomologie, Breslau 3: 9–128.Monograph on Tipulidae

With Johann Christian Carl Günther he issued the exsiccata Herbarium vivum plantas in Silesia indigenas exhibens a Christiano Günther et Aemilio Schummel collectum et omnibus botanicis inprimis Silesiae cultoribus ac amicis dicatum (1811–1830).

== Other sources ==
- Evenhuis, N. L. 1997, Litteratura taxonomica dipterorum (1758–1930). Volume 1 (A-K); Volume 2 (L-Z). Leiden, Backhuys Publishers.
