= List of Forcipomyia species =

This is a list of 1037 species in the genus Forcipomyia.

== Forcipomyia species ==
- Forcipomyia abbaekiefferi Debenham, 1987
- Forcipomyia abdominalis Tokunaga, 1940
- Forcipomyia abercrombyi Macfie, 1938
- Forcipomyia abyssiniae (Kieffer, 1918)
- Forcipomyia acanthophora Remm & Havelka, 1976
- Forcipomyia acidicola (Tokunaga, 1937)
- Forcipomyia acinacis Wirth & Spinelli, 1993
- Forcipomyia acinacium Debenham, 1987
- Forcipomyia adhesipes (Macfie, 1932)
- Forcipomyia adjecta Tokunaga, 1959
- Forcipomyia adversari Debenham, 1987
- Forcipomyia aenigma Meillon & Downes, 1986
- Forcipomyia aequalis (Skuse, 1889)
- Forcipomyia aeria Saunders, 1956
- Forcipomyia aerobates (Macfie, 1936)
- Forcipomyia aeronauctica Macfie, 1935
- Forcipomyia aeschnosuga (Meijere, 1927)
- Forcipomyia agas (Rondani, 1875)
- Forcipomyia aitkeni Meillon & Wirth, 1980
- Forcipomyia aiyurae Debenham, 1983
- Forcipomyia akizukii Tokunaga, 1940
- Forcipomyia alacris (Winnertz, 1852)
- Forcipomyia alamatae Macfie, 1937
- Forcipomyia alatauensis Remm, 1980
- Forcipomyia albiacies Debenham, 1987
- Forcipomyia albiradialis Tokunaga, 1940
- Forcipomyia albontata (Kieffer, 1910)
- Forcipomyia albopunctata (Skuse, 1889)
- Forcipomyia albosignata (Kieffer, 1910)
- Forcipomyia albostylus Remm, 1979
- Forcipomyia alienus Debenham, 1987
- Forcipomyia alleni Clastrier & Wirth, 1995
- Forcipomyia allocera Kieffer & Thienemann, 1916
- Forcipomyia almus Liu, Yan, Liu, Hao, Liu & Yu, 2001
- Forcipomyia alocasiae Tokunaga, 1961
- Forcipomyia altaica Remm, 1972
- Forcipomyia amazonica Wirth, 1971
- Forcipomyia ambientis Liu, Yan, Liu, Hao, Liu & Yu, 2001
- Forcipomyia amieuensis Clastrier & Delecolle, 1993
- Forcipomyia anabaenae Chan & Saunders, 1965
- Forcipomyia anachoreta Debenham, 1987
- Forcipomyia ancoriformis Tokunaga, 1959
- Forcipomyia angelicae Tokunaga, 1940
- Forcipomyia anguliforceps Tokunaga, 1940
- Forcipomyia angyria (Yu & Wirth, 1997)
- Forcipomyia anitae Huerta & Ibanez-Bernal, 1996
- Forcipomyia anna Meillon, 1959
- Forcipomyia annandalei Edwards, 1932
- Forcipomyia annulata (Meigen, 1838)
- Forcipomyia annulatipes Macfie, 1939
- Forcipomyia annulipes Tokunaga, 1940
- Forcipomyia anomala (Macquart, 1826)
- Forcipomyia ansericolli Debenham, 1987
- Forcipomyia anthropophila (Harrant, Huttel & Huttel, 1951)
- Forcipomyia antiguensis Saunders, 1956
- Forcipomyia antioquiae Clastrier & Wirth, 1995
- Forcipomyia antipodum Hudson, 1892
- Forcipomyia antrijovis (Kieffer, 1919)
- Forcipomyia antrosus Liu, Yan, Liu, Hao, Liu & Yu, 2001
- Forcipomyia apicalis Goetghebuer, 1935
- Forcipomyia appendicular Liu, Ge & Liu, 1996
- Forcipomyia aquatica Kieffer, 1922
- Forcipomyia araea (Yu & Wirth, 1997)
- Forcipomyia araneivora Clastrier & Legrand, 1991
- Forcipomyia archboldi Meillon & Wirth, 1980
- Forcipomyia arcigera Kieffer, 1921
- Forcipomyia arcis Debenham, 1987
- Forcipomyia argenteola Macfie, 1939
- Forcipomyia ariel (Macfie, 1932)
- Forcipomyia armandi Harant & Huttel, 1952
- Forcipomyia armativentris Clastrier, 1960
- Forcipomyia arnhemi Debenham, 1987
- Forcipomyia ashantii Ingram & Macfie, 1924
- Forcipomyia asquamata Clastrier & Delecolle, 1993
- Forcipomyia asticta Kieffer, 1913
- Forcipomyia astyla Tokunaga, 1940
- Forcipomyia asymmetrica Remm, 1980
- Forcipomyia atomaria Tokunaga, 1940
- Forcipomyia atopia Yu & Liu, 2000
- Forcipomyia atricella Debenham, 1987
- Forcipomyia attenuata Saunders, 1964
- Forcipomyia attonsa Goetghebuer, 1950
- Forcipomyia aurea Malloch, 1915
- Forcipomyia auripes Ingram & Macfie, 1924
- Forcipomyia auronitens (Kieffer, 1910)
- Forcipomyia australiensis (Kieffer, 1917)
- Forcipomyia australis Clastrier & Delecolle, 1991
- Forcipomyia austrina Macfie, 1932
- Forcipomyia avocadonis Meillon & Wirth, 1979
- Forcipomyia bacoti (Ingram & Macfie, 1923)
- Forcipomyia bahelea Liu, Yan, Liu, Hao, Liu & Yu, 2001
- Forcipomyia bahiensis Wirth & Spinelli, 1992
- Forcipomyia balteatus Liu, Yan, Liu, Hao, Liu & Yu, 2001
- Forcipomyia bambusa Liu & Yu, 1996
- Forcipomyia basendjiorum Dessart, 1962
- Forcipomyia basifemoralis Wirth & Spinelli, 1993
- Forcipomyia basiflava Tokunaga, 1959
- Forcipomyia baueri Wirth, 1956
- Forcipomyia beatulus Liu, Yan, Liu, Hao, Liu & Yu, 2001
- Forcipomyia beckae Wirth, 1976
- Forcipomyia belemensis Clastrier & Wirth, 1995
- Forcipomyia belkini Meillon & Wirth, 1979
- Forcipomyia bellerophon Debenham & Wirth, 1984
- Forcipomyia bernicla (Yu & Wirth, 1997)
- Forcipomyia bessa Liu, Yan, Liu, Hao, Liu & Yu, 2001
- Forcipomyia biannulata Ingram & Macfie, 1924
- Forcipomyia bicolor Lutz, 1914
- Forcipomyia bidenta (Yu & Wirth, 1997)
- Forcipomyia bifida Wirth & Spinelli, 1992
- Forcipomyia bifidipenis (Yu & Wirth, 1997)
- Forcipomyia bifurcifera Tokunaga, 1959
- Forcipomyia binifoliaceus (Yu & Wirth, 1997)
- Forcipomyia binigrimaculata Tokunaga, 1940
- Forcipomyia bipunctata (Linnaeus, 1767)
- Forcipomyia bipunctatapropinqua Chan and Leroux, 1971
- Forcipomyia biskraensis Kieffer, 1923
- Forcipomyia bispica (Yu & Wirth, 1997)
- Forcipomyia bispinula Liu & Yu, 1997
- Forcipomyia bitensis Kieffer, 1924
- Forcipomyia bituberculifera Tokunaga, 1959
- Forcipomyia blantoni Soria and Bystrak, 1975
- Forcipomyia blascoi Delecolle & Rieb, 1993
- Forcipomyia bonasa (Yu & Wirth, 1997)
- Forcipomyia boophila Lien, 1991
- Forcipomyia borbonica Clastrier, 1959
- Forcipomyia borealis Remm, 1966
- Forcipomyia borneoensis (Yu & Wirth, 1997)
- Forcipomyia boudinoti Clastrier & Delecolle, 1991
- Forcipomyia brachypetiolata Vimmer, 1918
- Forcipomyia brachyrhynchus Wirth & Dow, 1972
- Forcipomyia brachytoma Kieffer, 1921
- Forcipomyia brasiliana Clastrier & Wirth, 1995
- Forcipomyia brasiliensis Macfie, 1939
- Forcipomyia braueri (Wasmann, 1893)
- Forcipomyia breelandi Clastrier & Wirth, 1995
- Forcipomyia brevicosta (Clastrier, 1960)
- Forcipomyia brevicubitus Goetghebuer, 1920
- Forcipomyia breviforceps Tokunaga, 1940
- Forcipomyia brevilabellata Clastrier & Wirth, 1995
- Forcipomyia brevipalpis Liu, Yan, Liu, Hao, Liu & Yu, 2001
- Forcipomyia brevipedicellata (Kieffer, 1901)
- Forcipomyia brevipennis (Macquart, 1826)
- Forcipomyia brevis (Johannsen, 1927)
- Forcipomyia brevisicae Debenham, 1983
- Forcipomyia brevitarsata (Ingram & Macfie, 1924)
- Forcipomyia briani Meillon & Wirth, 1979
- Forcipomyia brinchangensis Meillon & Wirth, 1980
- Forcipomyia brincki Meillon, 1959
- Forcipomyia broadheadi Clastrier & Wirth, 1995
- Forcipomyia bromeliae Saunders, 1956
- Forcipomyia bromelicola (Lutz, 1914)
- Forcipomyia brunnea Meillon & Downes, 1986
- Forcipomyia bucera Debenham, 1987
- Forcipomyia bullata Debenham, 1987
- Forcipomyia bureschi Zilahi-Sebess, 1934
- Forcipomyia bystraki Grogan & Wirth, 1975
- Forcipomyia cacaoi Dessart, 1963
- Forcipomyia cacaophila Ronderos & Spinelli, 1999
- Forcipomyia caelomacula Liu Jinhua, Yan Ge & Liu Guoping, 1996
- Forcipomyia caerulea Saunders, 1956
- Forcipomyia caesariata Debenham, 1983
- Forcipomyia caestuum Debenham, 1987
- Forcipomyia calamistrata Debenham & Wirth, 1984
- Forcipomyia calatheae Wirth, 1982
- Forcipomyia calcarata (Coquillett, 1905)
- Forcipomyia calcarhelea Wirth, 1973
- Forcipomyia calchaqui Spinelli & Marino, 1997
- Forcipomyia caledonica Clastrier & Delecolle, 1993
- Forcipomyia caliginosa (Ingram & Macfie, 1924)
- Forcipomyia caliginosella Wirth, 1974
- Forcipomyia calotricha Kieffer, 1911
- Forcipomyia campana Debenham, 1987
- Forcipomyia campanula Meillon & Downes, 1986
- Forcipomyia canadensis Bystrak and Wirth, 1978
- Forcipomyia canicularis Goetghebuer, 1948
- Forcipomyia cantabrica (Strobl, 1900)
- Forcipomyia capax Debenham, 1987
- Forcipomyia caribbea Wirth and Dow, 1971
- Forcipomyia caribbeana Saunders, 1956
- Forcipomyia carolinea Tokunaga, 1959
- Forcipomyia carolinensis (Tokunaga, 1940)
- Forcipomyia castanea (Walker, 1848)
- Forcipomyia castneri Clastrier & Wirth, 1995
- Forcipomyia catarina Clastrier & Wirth, 1995
- Forcipomyia catarinensis Marino & Spinelli, 2002
- Forcipomyia cattleyarum Harant et Galan, 1924
- Forcipomyia cavatus Liu, Yan & Yu, 1999
- Forcipomyia centrosus Liu, Yan, Liu, Hao, Liu & Yu, 2001
- Forcipomyia centurio Debenham, 1987
- Forcipomyia cerberus Debenham, 1987
- Forcipomyia cerifera Saunders, 1956
- Forcipomyia chaetoptera Remm, 1962
- Forcipomyia charon Debenham, 1987
- Forcipomyia chazeaui Clastrier & Delecolle, 1991
- Forcipomyia chiengmai (Yu & Wirth, 1997)
- Forcipomyia chilensis (Philippi, 1865)
- Forcipomyia chirurgus Debenham, 1987
- Forcipomyia chongmingensis Liu, Yan, Liu, Hao, Liu & Yu, 2001
- Forcipomyia christiansoni Wirth and Hubert, 1960
- Forcipomyia chrysolopha (Kieffer, 1911)
- Forcipomyia chrysopipennis Wirth, 1966
- Forcipomyia chrysothrix (Kieffer, 1921)
- Forcipomyia ciliata (Winnertz, 1852)
- Forcipomyia ciliola Liu, Yan, Liu, Hao, Liu & Yu, 2001
- Forcipomyia cilipes (Coquillett, 1900)
- Forcipomyia cinctipes (Coquillett, 1905)
- Forcipomyia circinate Liu, Yan, Liu, Hao, Liu & Yu, 2001
- Forcipomyia cirrhosa Clastrier, Rioux & Descous, 1961
- Forcipomyia citowitschi Debenham, 1983
- Forcipomyia claggi Tokunaga, 1959
- Forcipomyia claris Yu, 2001
- Forcipomyia clastrieri Dessart, 1963
- Forcipomyia claudus Liu, Yan, Liu, Hao, Liu & Yu, 2001
- Forcipomyia clavulus Debenham, 1987
- Forcipomyia cliens Debenham, 1987
- Forcipomyia coarctata (Kieffer, 1901)
- Forcipomyia cochisei Wirth & Spinelli, 1993
- Forcipomyia coheni Clastrier & Wirth, 1995
- Forcipomyia colemani Wirth, 1952
- Forcipomyia collessi (Yu & Wirth, 1997)
- Forcipomyia collinsi Lane, 1977
- Forcipomyia collyricus Liu, Ge & Liu, 1996
- Forcipomyia colombiae Wirth, 1970
- Forcipomyia colombiana Clastrier & Wirth, 1995
- Forcipomyia colonus Debenham, 1987
- Forcipomyia coloratus Liu, Yan, Liu, Hao, Liu & Yu, 2001
- Forcipomyia colum Debenham, 1983
- Forcipomyia comis Johannsen, 1931
- Forcipomyia concolor Malloch, 1915
- Forcipomyia confluens Kieffer, 1913
- Forcipomyia confragosus Liu, Yan, Liu, Hao, Liu & Yu, 2001
- Forcipomyia conigera Kieffer, 1913
- Forcipomyia conocolor Malloch, 1915
- Forcipomyia consortis Meillon & Wirth, 1989
- Forcipomyia contraria Debenham, 1987
- Forcipomyia conturbatus Liu, Yan, Liu, Hao, Liu & Yu, 2001
- Forcipomyia convexipenis Wirth & Spinelli, 1992
- Forcipomyia cooki Macfie, 1932
- Forcipomyia coprophila Kieffer, 1914
- Forcipomyia corinneae Gosseries, 1989
- Forcipomyia cornuta Saunders, 1964
- Forcipomyia corsoni Macfie, 1926
- Forcipomyia corticis Kieffer, 1911
- Forcipomyia crassipalpis Debenham, 1987
- Forcipomyia crassipes (Winnertz, 1852)
- Forcipomyia creesi Meillon, Meiswinkel & Wirth, 1982
- Forcipomyia crepidinis Debenham, 1987
- Forcipomyia crinita Saunders, 1964
- Forcipomyia crinume (Tokunaga, 1932)
- Forcipomyia cristata Clastrier & Wirth, 1995
- Forcipomyia crocea Debenham, 1983
- Forcipomyia cubicularis Kieffer, 1911
- Forcipomyia cubitalis (Kieffer, 1918)
- Forcipomyia cuculli Debenham, 1983
- Forcipomyia curticornis Goetghebuer, 1933
- Forcipomyia curtus Liu, Yan, Liu, Hao, Liu & Yu, 2001
- Forcipomyia cylindrica Wirth & Dow, 1972
- Forcipomyia cylindripalpis Clastrier & Delecolle, 1993
- Forcipomyia cymodocea Nie, Li, Li & Yu, 2003
- Forcipomyia cypri (Kieffer, 1918)
- Forcipomyia dacica Damian-Georgescu, 1972
- Forcipomyia danaisi (Floch & Abonnenc, 1949)
- Forcipomyia danica Kieffer, 1915
- Forcipomyia danxianensis Yu & Liu, 1982
- Forcipomyia darwini Marino & Spinelli, 2003
- Forcipomyia davidi Debenham, 1987
- Forcipomyia daxingensis Liu, Yan, Liu, Hao, Liu & Yu, 2001
- Forcipomyia debenhamae Clastrier & Delecolle, 1991
- Forcipomyia decipiens (Kieffer, 1910)
- Forcipomyia declivis Debenham, 1987
- Forcipomyia defatigatus Liu, Yan, Liu, Hao, Liu & Yu, 2001
- Forcipomyia deformis Liu, Yan, Liu, Hao, Liu & Yu, 2001
- Forcipomyia delenificus Liu Jinhua, Tang Boheng & Hao Boashan, 2002
- Forcipomyia delpontei Cavalieri, 1962
- Forcipomyia demeter Debenham, 1987
- Forcipomyia deminuta Tokunaga & Murachi, 1959
- Forcipomyia desertensis Wirth and Hubert, 1960
- Forcipomyia despecta Kieffer, 1921
- Forcipomyia desurvillei Macfie, 1932
- Forcipomyia desutterae Clastrier & Wirth, 1995
- Forcipomyia deucalionis Debenham & Wirth, 1984
- Forcipomyia diaoluoensis Yu & Liu, 1982
- Forcipomyia dichromata Remm & Zhogolev, 1968
- Forcipomyia dirina Liu, Yan, Liu, Hao, Liu & Yu, 2001
- Forcipomyia dirus (Liu, Yan & Liu, 1996)
- Forcipomyia discoloripes Macfie, 1939
- Forcipomyia dissimilis Clastrier & Delecolle, 1991
- Forcipomyia distapalpis Liu, Yan, Liu, Hao, Liu & Yu, 2001
- Forcipomyia dividus Liu, Yan, Liu, Hao, Liu & Yu, 2001
- Forcipomyia dolichopodida Chan & Linley, 1989
- Forcipomyia dominicana Meillon & Wirth, 1979
- Forcipomyia donskoffi Clastrier & Wirth, 1995
- Forcipomyia dorsalis Wirth & Dow, 1972
- Forcipomyia dowi Bystrak and Wirth, 1978
- Forcipomyia draconis Meillon & Wirth, 1980
- Forcipomyia dubia Macfie, 1939
- Forcipomyia dubiamima Wirth & Spinelli, 1993
- Forcipomyia dunklei Clastrier & Wirth, 1995
- Forcipomyia dycei Debenham & Wirth, 1984
- Forcipomyia eadsi Wirth & Spinelli, 1993
- Forcipomyia edgari Tokunaga & Murachi, 1959
- Forcipomyia edmistoni Wirth & Spinelli, 1993
- Forcipomyia edwardsi (Saunders, 1925)
- Forcipomyia edwardsiana Wirth, 1974
- Forcipomyia elegans Meillon & Wirth, 1987
- Forcipomyia elegantula Malloch, 1915
- Forcipomyia elongata (Kieffer, 1901)
- Forcipomyia emeishana Yu & Liu, 1982
- Forcipomyia ensifera Macfie, 1934
- Forcipomyia episcopus Debenham, 1987
- Forcipomyia eques (Johannsen, 1908)
- Forcipomyia equitans (Edwards, 1933)
- Forcipomyia eriophora (Williston, 1896)
- Forcipomyia esakiana Tokunaga, 1940
- Forcipomyia esakii (Tokunaga, 1940)
- Forcipomyia eshowensis Meillon, 1937
- Forcipomyia eukosma Macfie, 1939
- Forcipomyia euthystyla Wirth & Spinelli, 1992
- Forcipomyia euzierei Harant et Galan, 1943
- Forcipomyia excellens Johannsen, 1931
- Forcipomyia exigua Ingram & Macfie, 1924
- Forcipomyia fairfaxensis Wirth, 1951
- Forcipomyia falcifera Saunders, 1959
- Forcipomyia falcinella (Kieffer, 1911)
- Forcipomyia fangchengensis Liu, Yan, Liu, Hao, Liu & Yu, 2001
- Forcipomyia farri Wirth, 1966
- Forcipomyia fasciata Tokunaga, 1940
- Forcipomyia fascicauda Tokunaga, 1940
- Forcipomyia fehrerorum Grogan & Sigrist, 2007
- Forcipomyia felippebauerae Clastrier & Wirth, 1995
- Forcipomyia feminae (Tokunaga, 1940)
- Forcipomyia fenestrarum Debenham, 1983
- Forcipomyia fengjiensis Yu, Liang, Chen, He & Su, 2007
- Forcipomyia ferrea Debenham, 1987
- Forcipomyia ficula (Yu & Wirth, 1997)
- Forcipomyia fidelis Krivosheina, 1968
- Forcipomyia fidens (Macfie, 1936)
- Forcipomyia fijiensis (Macfie, 1945)
- Forcipomyia filicauda Remm, 1993
- Forcipomyia fimbriata (Coquillett, 1901)
- Forcipomyia fishi Wirth and Soria, 1980
- Forcipomyia flava (Williston, 1896)
- Forcipomyia flaveola Clastrier & Delecolle, 1993
- Forcipomyia flavescens Saunders, 1964
- Forcipomyia flaviceps Kieffer, 1913
- Forcipomyia flavicincta Santos Abreu, 1918
- Forcipomyia flavicoxis Goetghebuer, 1935
- Forcipomyia flavifemoris Macfie, 1940
- Forcipomyia flavipectoralis Tokunaga, 1959
- Forcipomyia flavitibialis Tokunaga & Murachi, 1959
- Forcipomyia flavomaculata Vimmer, 1928
- Forcipomyia flavominima Remm, 1971
- Forcipomyia flavus Liu, Ge & Liu, 1996
- Forcipomyia floridensis Dow and Wirth, 1972
- Forcipomyia foliacceus Liu, Yan, Liu, Hao, Liu & Yu, 2001
- Forcipomyia folipenis Liu & Yu, 1997
- Forcipomyia folipennis Liu & Yu, 1997
- Forcipomyia forcipis Meillon & Wirth, 1980
- Forcipomyia forfices Debenham, 1987
- Forcipomyia forficula (Yu & Wirth, 1997)
- Forcipomyia formicaria Kieffer & Thienemann, 1908
- Forcipomyia formosae (Kieffer, 1921)
- Forcipomyia formosana Kieffer, 1916
- Forcipomyia franklini Clastrier & Wirth, 1995
- Forcipomyia freyi Stora, 1936
- Forcipomyia frigidus Liu, Yan, Liu, Hao, Liu & Yu, 2001
- Forcipomyia frutetorum (Winnertz, 1852)
- Forcipomyia fuliginata Clastrier, 1983
- Forcipomyia fuliginosa (Meigen, 1818)
- Forcipomyia fulvescens Santos Abreu, 1918
- Forcipomyia furcifera Macfie, 1940
- Forcipomyia furculae Debenham, 1987
- Forcipomyia furfura Meillon & Wirth, 1989
- Forcipomyia fusca (Philippi, 1865)
- Forcipomyia fuscicalcarata Bystrak and Wirth, 1978
- Forcipomyia fusciforceps (Kieffer, 1918)
- Forcipomyia fuscimaculata Hardy, 1960
- Forcipomyia fuscimana (Kieffer, 1921)
- Forcipomyia fusicornis (Coquillett, 1905
- Forcipomyia galapagensis (Coquillett, 1901)
- Forcipomyia galbiventris Borkent, 1997
- Forcipomyia galeata Debenham & Wirth, 1984
- Forcipomyia galliarii Marino & Spinelli, 1999
- Forcipomyia gandangara Debenham, 1987
- Forcipomyia geniflava Tokunaga, 1959
- Forcipomyia genualis (Loew, 1866)
- Forcipomyia geometrica (Clastrier, 1959)
- Forcipomyia gibbus Debenham, 1987
- Forcipomyia glauca Macfie, 1934
- Forcipomyia globularis Edwards, 1928
- Forcipomyia gloriose Liu, Yan, Liu, Hao, Liu & Yu, 2001
- Forcipomyia gokwe Meillon & Wirth, 1989
- Forcipomyia goniognatha Wirth and Messersmith, 1971
- Forcipomyia grallator Debenham, 1987
- Forcipomyia gramencola Lien, 1991
- Forcipomyia grandcolasi Clastrier & Wirth, 1995
- Forcipomyia grata Macfie, 1934
- Forcipomyia gravesi Wirth & Spinelli, 1992
- Forcipomyia gressitti Tokunaga & Murachi, 1959
- Forcipomyia gripha Borkent, 1997
- Forcipomyia guamai Wirth & Dow, 1972
- Forcipomyia guamensis Tokunaga & Murachi, 1959
- Forcipomyia guangdongensis Liu, Yan, Liu, Hao, Liu & Yu, 2001
- Forcipomyia guarani Ronderos & Spinelli, 1999
- Forcipomyia guilleaumei Goetghebuer, 1935
- Forcipomyia guttata Meillon & Wirth, 1989
- Forcipomyia guyana Clastrier & Wirth, 1995
- Forcipomyia hainana (Liu, Yan & Liu, 1996)
- Forcipomyia halterata (Winnertz, 1852)
- Forcipomyia hamata Tokunaga, 1959
- Forcipomyia hamaticauda Tokunaga, 1959
- Forcipomyia hamoni Meillon, 1959
- Forcipomyia hardyi Wirth & Howarth, 1982
- Forcipomyia haroldi Meillon & Wirth, 1989
- Forcipomyia harpa Spinelli & Borkent, 2004
- Forcipomyia hastata Meillon & Wirth, 1981
- Forcipomyia heilongjiangensis Liu, Yan, Liu, Hao, Liu & Yu, 2001
- Forcipomyia herbaceus Liu, Yan, Liu, Hao, Liu & Yu, 2001
- Forcipomyia herediae Wirth & Spinelli, 1992
- Forcipomyia hesiones Meillon, 1936
- Forcipomyia heterocera Kieffer, 1913
- Forcipomyia hicksae Debenham, 1983
- Forcipomyia hikosanensis Tokunaga, 1940
- Forcipomyia himalayae Kieffer, 1911
- Forcipomyia hirsuta Ingram & Macfie, 1924
- Forcipomyia hirtipennis (Malloch, 1915)
- Forcipomyia hirtula (Zetterstedt, 1838)
- Forcipomyia hissarica Remm, 1980
- Forcipomyia hobbsi Wirth & Spinelli, 1992
- Forcipomyia homaliae Lien, 1991
- Forcipomyia humilavolita Yu & Liu, 1982
- Forcipomyia hunjiangensis Qu & Ye, 1995
- Forcipomyia hurdi Wirth, 1952
- Forcipomyia hutsoni Wirth & Ratanaworabhan, 1976
- Forcipomyia hutteli Arnold & Jarry, 1956
- Forcipomyia hybrida Remm, 1980
- Forcipomyia hydratus Liu, Ge & Liu, 1996
- Forcipomyia hygrophila Kieffer, 1925
- Forcipomyia hylecoeta Yu & Xu, 2000
- Forcipomyia iaculum Debenham & Wirth, 1984
- Forcipomyia idaeus Yu & Liu, 2000
- Forcipomyia ignobilis Liu, Yan, Liu, Hao, Liu & Yu, 2001
- Forcipomyia ikinae Meillon, Meiswinkel & Wirth, 1982
- Forcipomyia illimis Liu, Yan, Liu, Hao, Liu & Yu, 2001
- Forcipomyia immaculata Vimmer, 1928
- Forcipomyia imparidentes Debenham, 1987
- Forcipomyia improbiserra Debenham, 1987
- Forcipomyia incomposita Debenham, 1983
- Forcipomyia inconspicuosa Ingram & Macfie, 1924
- Forcipomyia incubans (Macfie, 1937)
- Forcipomyia incus Debenham, 1987
- Forcipomyia indecora Kieffer, 1914
- Forcipomyia infans Debenham, 1983
- Forcipomyia inflatipalpis Clastrier & Delecolle, 1993
- Forcipomyia ingenua Macfie, 1934
- Forcipomyia ingrami Carter, 1960
- Forcipomyia inornatipennis (Austen, 1912)
- Forcipomyia insignicornis (Macfie, 1947)
- Forcipomyia insigniforceps Macfie, 1939
- Forcipomyia insignipalpis Macfie, 1949
- Forcipomyia insignis (Skuse, 1889)
- Forcipomyia insulae Clastrier & Delecolle, 1993
- Forcipomyia intermedia Saunders, 1964
- Forcipomyia intrepida Macfie, 1936
- Forcipomyia intrudens Liu, Ge & Liu, 1996
- Forcipomyia iquitosensis Clastrier & Wirth, 1995
- Forcipomyia ishikariensis Yamashita, Kimatura & Nakamura, 1957
- Forcipomyia ishizuchiensis (Udaka, 1959)
- Forcipomyia ixodoides (Fiebrig-Gertz, 1928)
- Forcipomyia jamaicensis Wirth, 1970
- Forcipomyia japonica (Tokunaga, 1937)
- Forcipomyia jipajapae Wirth, 1970
- Forcipomyia jocosa Saunders, 1956
- Forcipomyia jocosus Yu & Maha, 1998
- Forcipomyia johannseni Thomsen, 1935
- Forcipomyia kabashae Meillon, 1959
- Forcipomyia kaltenbachii (Winnertz, 1852)
- Forcipomyia kamilaroi Debenham, 1983
- Forcipomyia kaneohe Wirth & Howarth, 1982
- Forcipomyia karnyi Edwards, 1923
- Forcipomyia kaufmannae Wirth & Derron, 1976
- Forcipomyia kawensis Clastrier & Wirth, 1995
- Forcipomyia keilini (Saunders, 1925)
- Forcipomyia khoisana Meillon & Wirth, 1979
- Forcipomyia kii (Tokunaga, 1940)
- Forcipomyia kilemae Kieffer, 1913
- Forcipomyia kitasirakawae Tokunaga, 1940
- Forcipomyia knockensis Goetghebuer, 1938
- Forcipomyia koniae (Kieffer, 1918)
- Forcipomyia kribiensis (Kieffer, 1921)
- Forcipomyia kuanosceles Macfie, 1939
- Forcipomyia kuscheli Sublette & Wirth, 1980
- Forcipomyia kyotoensis Tokunaga, 1940
- Forcipomyia labidentis Yu & Zhang, 1982
- Forcipomyia laboulbeni (Perris, 1870)
- Forcipomyia lacrimatorii Macfie, 1939
- Forcipomyia lagoenae Debenham, 1987
- Forcipomyia lagonigera Kieffer, 1921
- Forcipomyia laguncula Kieffer, 1925
- Forcipomyia lairdi (Wirth, 1956)
- Forcipomyia lanceolata Macfie, 1934
- Forcipomyia largus Liu, Yan, Liu, Hao, Liu & Yu, 2001
- Forcipomyia lateralis (Bouché, 1834)
- Forcipomyia latifolia (Yu & Wirth, 1997)
- Forcipomyia latipes (Macfie, 1936)
- Forcipomyia latiunguis Clastrier, 1983
- Forcipomyia laxus Liu, Yan, Liu, Hao, Liu & Yu, 2001
- Forcipomyia lecordeurorum Meillon, Meiswinkel & Wirth, 1982
- Forcipomyia leei Wirth and Ratanaworabhan, 1978
- Forcipomyia lefanui Carter, 1916
- Forcipomyia lemuria Meillon, 1961
- Forcipomyia lepida (Winnertz, 1852)
- Forcipomyia lepidopus (Kieffer, 1917)
- Forcipomyia lepta (Yu & Wirth, 1997)
- Forcipomyia leptognatha Wirth and Messersmith, 1971
- Forcipomyia leptolepis Krivosheina et Remm, 1974
- Forcipomyia lesliei Wirth, 1974
- Forcipomyia letabanus Meillon, Meiswinkel & Wirth, 1982
- Forcipomyia leucochaeta (Kieffer, 1921)
- Forcipomyia leucoptera (Meigen, 1804)
- Forcipomyia lignarius Debenham, 1987
- Forcipomyia lignicola (Brunetti, 1912)
- Forcipomyia limnetis Ingram & Macfie, 1931
- Forcipomyia lingnanensis Liu, Yan & Yu, 1999
- Forcipomyia litoralis Santos Abreu, 1918
- Forcipomyia litoraurea (Ingram & Macfie, 1924)
- Forcipomyia lokki Remm, 1993
- Forcipomyia longicalcar Kieffer, 1912
- Forcipomyia longicauda (Yu, 1997)
- Forcipomyia longiconus Liu, Yan, Liu, Hao, Liu & Yu, 2001
- Forcipomyia longicornis (Tokunaga, 1940)
- Forcipomyia longineura Saunders, 1964
- Forcipomyia longipalpula (Yu & Wirth, 1997)
- Forcipomyia longiseta Yu & Liu, 1999
- Forcipomyia longisetosa Krivosheina et Remm, 1973
- Forcipomyia longispina Saunders, 1956
- Forcipomyia longitarsis (Malloch, 1915)
- Forcipomyia longurius Liu & Yu, 1997
- Forcipomyia lotus (Williston, 1896)
- Forcipomyia louriei (Macfie, 1935)
- Forcipomyia lugubris (Zetterstedt, 1855)
- Forcipomyia lui (Liu, Yan & Liu, 1996)
- Forcipomyia lunata Debenham, 1987
- Forcipomyia lushana Yu & Wang, 1982
- Forcipomyia luteigenua Wirth & Spinelli, 1992
- Forcipomyia luteisquamosa Wirth, 1972
- Forcipomyia luteofulvous Liu, Yan, Liu, Hao, Liu & Yu, 2001
- Forcipomyia luzona (Yu & Wirth, 1997)
- Forcipomyia lydiae Clastrier & Delecolle, 1991
- Forcipomyia macheti Clastrier & Legrand, 1990
- Forcipomyia macronyx Goetghebuer, 1933
- Forcipomyia macrorhynchus (Kieffer, 1910)
- Forcipomyia macrothrix Kieffer, 1911
- Forcipomyia macswaini Wirth, 1952
- Forcipomyia maculatus Liu, Ge & Liu, 1996
- Forcipomyia maculipennis Tokunaga, 1940
- Forcipomyia maculipes (Goetghebuer, 1933)
- Forcipomyia maculosa Ingram & Macfie, 1931
- Forcipomyia maculosicrura Tokunaga, 1959
- Forcipomyia madeira Clastrier, 1991
- Forcipomyia maderia Clastrier, 1991
- Forcipomyia magna (Saunders, 1925)
- Forcipomyia magnasacculus Liu, Yan, Liu, Hao, Liu & Yu, 2001
- Forcipomyia magnipunctata Tokunaga, 1940
- Forcipomyia magnispinosa Clastrier & Delecolle, 1993
- Forcipomyia mahamutius Liu, Yan, Liu, Hao, Liu & Yu, 2001
- Forcipomyia mahensis (Kieffer, 1911)
- Forcipomyia makanensis Hou, 2019
- Forcipomyia malayae Saunders, 1956
- Forcipomyia manasi Maheshwari, 2003
- Forcipomyia manchuriensis Tokunaga, 1941
- Forcipomyia manis Debenham, 1987
- Forcipomyia manzhuangensis Liu, Yan, Liu, Hao, Liu & Yu, 2001
- Forcipomyia mapuche Marino & Spinelli, 2003
- Forcipomyia margaritae Szadziewski, 1983
- Forcipomyia marini Spinelli & Dippolito, 1995
- Forcipomyia marksae Tokunaga, 1961
- Forcipomyia marsafae Ghonaim, Ibrahim & Ali, 2001
- Forcipomyia marsalae (Vattier & Adam, 1966)
- Forcipomyia masaakii Debenham, 1989
- Forcipomyia matautuensis Clastrier & Delecolle, 1996
- Forcipomyia matilei Clastrier & Delecolle, 1991
- Forcipomyia matsumurai Kitaoka, 1994
- Forcipomyia maura (Kieffer, 1918)
- Forcipomyia mcateei Wirth, 1956
- Forcipomyia mcmillani Clastrier & Wirth, 1961
- Forcipomyia medipalus Debenham, 1987
- Forcipomyia mediterranea (Kieffer, 1919)
- Forcipomyia melanchora Ingram & Macfie, 1924
- Forcipomyia mengi Liu & Yu, 1996
- Forcipomyia menzeli Clastrier & Wirth, 1995
- Forcipomyia mercuratas Liu, Ge & Liu, 1996
- Forcipomyia mesasiatica Remm, 1980
- Forcipomyia messersmithi Wirth & Dow, 1972
- Forcipomyia mexicana Wirth, 1956
- Forcipomyia microtoma (Kieffer, 1917)
- Forcipomyia mimima (Tokunaga, 1940)
- Forcipomyia minisquamosa Wirth, 1972
- Forcipomyia ministra Debenham, 1983
- Forcipomyia minitheca Marino & Spinelli, 2001
- Forcipomyia minor Liu, Ge & Liu, 1996
- Forcipomyia minuta (Tokunaga, 1940)
- Forcipomyia mira Johannsen, 1931
- Forcipomyia miricornis Kieffer, 1916
- Forcipomyia mixta Yu & Liu, 1982
- Forcipomyia mollipes (Macfie, 1932)
- Forcipomyia monilicornis (Coquillett, 1905)
- Forcipomyia monoceros Debenham, 1987
- Forcipomyia monoplectron Lane, 1977
- Forcipomyia montana Meillon & Downes, 1986
- Forcipomyia monticola Kieffer, 1913
- Forcipomyia monticolonia Tokunaga, 1966
- Forcipomyia moorei Clastrier & Wirth, 1995
- Forcipomyia mopsus Meillon & Hardy, 1954
- Forcipomyia morenoi Marino & Spinelli, 2003
- Forcipomyia moriokensis Kitaoka, 1994
- Forcipomyia mortuifolii Saunders, 1959
- Forcipomyia mucronis Liu, Yan, Liu, Hao, Liu & Yu, 2001
- Forcipomyia multidentata Ronderos & Spinelli, 1999
- Forcipomyia multipicta Ingram & Macfie, 1931
- Forcipomyia murina (Winnertz, 1852)
- Forcipomyia murphyi Clastrier & Wirth, 1961
- Forcipomyia musae Clastrier & Delecolle, 1994
- Forcipomyia muzoni Marino & Spinelli, 2004
- Forcipomyia myrmecophila (Egger, 1863)
- Forcipomyia nana (Macfie, 1939)
- Forcipomyia nanjingensis Yu & Wang, 1982
- Forcipomyia nanshengwei Yu, Liang, Chen, He & Su, 2007
- Forcipomyia narthekophora Macfie, 1939
- Forcipomyia nasuensis Kitaoka, 1994
- Forcipomyia natalia (Meillon, 1936)
- Forcipomyia navaiae Bystrak and Wirth, 1978
- Forcipomyia nemus Debenham, 1983
- Forcipomyia neocaledoniensis Clastrier & Delecolle, 1991
- Forcipomyia neodebenhamae Szadziewski & Borkent, 2003
- Forcipomyia neomonticola Borkent, 1997
- Forcipomyia neotokunagai Szadziewski & Borkent, 2003
- Forcipomyia neotropica Clastrier & Wirth, 1995
- Forcipomyia neowirthi Szadziewski & Borkent, 2003
- Forcipomyia nepala (Yu, 2000)
- Forcipomyia nhulunbuyensis Debenham, 1983
- Forcipomyia nigeriae (Ingram & Macfie, 1924)
- Forcipomyia nigeriensis Ingram & Macfie, 1924
- Forcipomyia nigra (Winnertz, 1852)
- Forcipomyia nigrans Remm, 1962
- Forcipomyia nigrescens Macfie, 1939
- Forcipomyia nigricoxis Goetghebuer, 1935
- Forcipomyia nigrimaxillata Clastrier & Wirth, 1995
- Forcipomyia nigrotibialis Ingram & Macfie, 1924
- Forcipomyia nilicola (Kieffer, 1924)
- Forcipomyia niligena (Kieffer, 1921)
- Forcipomyia nilotica (Kieffer, 1921)
- Forcipomyia nipponica (Tokunaga, 1940)
- Forcipomyia noctivaga Kieffer, 1912
- Forcipomyia nodosa Saunders, 1959
- Forcipomyia noewirthi Szadziewski & Borkent, 2003
- Forcipomyia notata Macfie, 1939
- Forcipomyia notohena Liu & Yu, 1997
- Forcipomyia notothena Liu & Yu, 1997
- Forcipomyia novaeteutoniae Clastrier & Wirth, 1995
- Forcipomyia novaguineae Tokunaga, 1959
- Forcipomyia nudocola (Tokunaga, 1973)
- Forcipomyia nuncupata Macfie, 1949
- Forcipomyia obesa Lima, 1928
- Forcipomyia obscura (Walker, 1848)
- Forcipomyia ochracea Vimmer, 1928
- Forcipomyia ocrearum Debenham, 1987
- Forcipomyia odonatiphila (Macfie, 1932)
- Forcipomyia ogatai Tokunaga, 1961
- Forcipomyia okadai (Tokunaga, 1939)
- Forcipomyia oligarthra Saunders, 1956
- Forcipomyia onusta Remm, 1980
- Forcipomyia onustagalea Yu, 2000
- Forcipomyia onustus Yu & Liu, 1999
- Forcipomyia operimenti Debenham, 1987
- Forcipomyia opilionivora (Lane, 1947)
- Forcipomyia orbis Debenham, 1987
- Forcipomyia oreita Liu & Yu, 1996
- Forcipomyia orientalis Kieffer, 1924
- Forcipomyia ornata Tokunaga, 1940
- Forcipomyia ornaticrus Kieffer, 1912
- Forcipomyia ornatipennis Macfie, 1939
- Forcipomyia ornatipes (Kieffer, 1918)
- Forcipomyia oryx Debenham, 1987
- Forcipomyia ostiola (Yu & Wirth, 1997)
- Forcipomyia oxypenis (Yu & Wirth, 1997)
- Forcipomyia oxyria Yu & Liu, 1985
- Forcipomyia pachyparamera Clastrier & Delecolle, 1991
- Forcipomyia pacifica (Macfie, 1933)
- Forcipomyia padi Remm, 1979
- Forcipomyia paenedentula Debenham, 1983
- Forcipomyia paenulata Debenham, 1987
- Forcipomyia palikuensis Hardy, 1960
- Forcipomyia pallida (Winnertz, 1852)
- Forcipomyia pallidipes Santos Abreu, 1918
- Forcipomyia pallidistylus Krivosheina et Remm, 1974
- Forcipomyia pallipes (Meigen, 1818)
- Forcipomyia palliscuta Tokunaga, 1959
- Forcipomyia palmarum Debenham, 1987
- Forcipomyia palmensis Santos Abreu, 1918
- Forcipomyia paludia (Macfie, 1936)
- Forcipomyia paludis (Macfie, 1936)
- Forcipomyia palustris (Meigen, 1804)
- Forcipomyia pampoikila Ingram & Macfie, 1924
- Forcipomyia papuensis Lane & Cotman, 1986
- Forcipomyia pardus Debenham, 1987
- Forcipomyia parenthesis Debenham, 1983
- Forcipomyia parva (Walker, 1848)
- Forcipomyia parvicellula Ingram & Macfie, 1931
- Forcipomyia parvicrater Debenham, 1987
- Forcipomyia parvitas Liu & Yu, 1996
- Forcipomyia paucidentis Lien, 1991
- Forcipomyia pechumani Bystrak and Wirth, 1978
- Forcipomyia pectinis Liu, Yan, Liu, Hao, Liu & Yu, 2001
- Forcipomyia pectinunguis (Meijere, 1923)
- Forcipomyia pennambula Macfie, 1932
- Forcipomyia pennaticauda Debenham, 1987
- Forcipomyia pensiledentia (Yu & Wirth, 1997)
- Forcipomyia penultimata Wirth, 1972
- Forcipomyia perae Debenham, 1983
- Forcipomyia perangusta (Goetghebuer, 1935)
- Forcipomyia peregrinator Debenham, 1983
- Forcipomyia perflavida Remm, 1971
- Forcipomyia pergandei (Coquillett, 1901)
- Forcipomyia perpusillus Liu, Yan, Liu, Hao, Liu & Yu, 2001
- Forcipomyia persa Liu, Yan, Liu, Hao, Liu & Yu, 2001
- Forcipomyia peruviana Clastrier & Wirth, 1995
- Forcipomyia phlebotomoides Bangerter, 1933
- Forcipomyia pholeter Wirth & Howarth, 1982
- Forcipomyia phototropia Yu & Zhang, 1982
- Forcipomyia phototropisma Liu, Yan, Liu, Hao, Liu & Yu, 2001
- Forcipomyia picheyeri Harant et Galan, 1942
- Forcipomyia pictiscutaris Tokunaga, 1959
- Forcipomyia pictisquamipennis Tokunaga, 1959
- Forcipomyia pictoni Macfie, 1938
- Forcipomyia picturatus Liu, Yan, Liu, Hao, Liu & Yu, 2001
- Forcipomyia pilosa (Coquillett, 1902)
- Forcipomyia pinamarensis Spinelli, 1983
- Forcipomyia pingxiangensis Liu, Yan, Liu, Hao, Liu & Yu, 2001
- Forcipomyia pinheyi Clastrier & Legrand, 1984
- Forcipomyia pinicola Bystrak and Messersmith, 1980
- Forcipomyia pinjiensis Liu, Yan, Liu, Hao, Liu & Yu, 2001
- Forcipomyia pipiens Liu, Ge & Liu, 1996
- Forcipomyia piroskyi Cavalieri, 1962
- Forcipomyia platensis (Brèthes, 1914)
- Forcipomyia plaumanni Clastrier & Wirth, 1995
- Forcipomyia plumosa Debenham, 1983
- Forcipomyia pluvialis Malloch, 1923
- Forcipomyia poluaineae Ingram & Macfie, 1931
- Forcipomyia pontica Remm & Zhogoley, 1968
- Forcipomyia postrema (Santos Abreu, 1918)
- Forcipomyia praealtus Liu, Yan, Liu, Hao, Liu & Yu, 2001
- Forcipomyia praecincta Santos Abreu, 1918
- Forcipomyia pretoriana (Kieffer, 1918)
- Forcipomyia pricei Wirth & Spinelli, 1993
- Forcipomyia proavia Debenham, 1987
- Forcipomyia proximornata Debenham, 1987
- Forcipomyia pseudonigra Delecolle & Schiegg, 1999
- Forcipomyia psilonota (Kieffer, 1911)
- Forcipomyia psychasta Kieffer, 1913
- Forcipomyia puhtuensis Remm, 1979
- Forcipomyia pulcherrima Santos Abreu, 1918
- Forcipomyia pulchrithorax Edwards, 1924
- Forcipomyia pulla Meillon & Wirth, 1981
- Forcipomyia punctatipennis Kieffer, 1924
- Forcipomyia punctipes Edwards, 1928
- Forcipomyia punctumalbum (Kieffer, 1917)
- Forcipomyia puracensis Wirth & Dow, 1972
- Forcipomyia puteus Debenham, 1983
- Forcipomyia qionghainensis Liu, Yan, Liu, Hao, Liu & Yu, 2001
- Forcipomyia quadriflava Tokunaga, 1959
- Forcipomyia quasicornuta Saunders, 1964
- Forcipomyia quasiingrami Macfie, 1939
- Forcipomyia quatei Wirth, 1952
- Forcipomyia quateriungula Tokunaga, 1959
- Forcipomyia quechua Marino & Spinelli, 2002
- Forcipomyia qufuensis Liu, Yan, Liu, Hao, Liu & Yu, 2001
- Forcipomyia quinqueremis Debenham, 1987
- Forcipomyia quokkae Debenham, 1987
- Forcipomyia radicicola Edwards, 1924
- Forcipomyia radiifera (Kieffer, 1918)
- Forcipomyia randensis Meillon, 1931
- Forcipomyia randensoides Dessart, 1961
- Forcipomyia raposoensis Clastrier & Wirth, 1995
- Forcipomyia raposoi Meillon & Wirth, 1980
- Forcipomyia rastraria Debenham, 1983
- Forcipomyia ratis Liu, Yan, Liu, Hao, Liu & Yu, 2001
- Forcipomyia reburra Borkent, 1997
- Forcipomyia recussus Liu, Yan, Liu, Hao, Liu & Yu, 2001
- Forcipomyia regulus (Winnertz, 1852)
- Forcipomyia repandus Liu, Yan, Liu, Hao, Liu & Yu, 2001
- Forcipomyia resinicola (Kieffer, 1901)
- Forcipomyia rettenmeyerorum Clastrier & Wirth, 1995
- Forcipomyia rhamphis (Yu & Wirth, 1997)
- Forcipomyia richardlanei Clastrier, 1983
- Forcipomyia riojana Spinelli & Marino, 1997
- Forcipomyia rioplatensis Marino & Spinelli, 2002
- Forcipomyia ripa (Yu & Liu, 2000)
- Forcipomyia roseae Meillon, Meiswinkel & Wirth, 1982
- Forcipomyia roubaudi Clastrier & Delecolle, 1997
- Forcipomyia rudebecki Meillon, 1959
- Forcipomyia rufescens (Kieffer, 1918)
- Forcipomyia rugosa Chan and Leroux, 1970
- Forcipomyia rupicola Debenham, 1987
- Forcipomyia ruralis Liu, Yan, Liu, Hao, Liu & Yu, 2001
- Forcipomyia russelli Debenham, 1983
- Forcipomyia rustica (Kieffer, 1919)
- Forcipomyia sabroskyi Tokunaga, 1959
- Forcipomyia sagittarius Debenham & Wirth, 1984
- Forcipomyia sahariensis Kieffer, 1923
- Forcipomyia salmi (Meijere, 1909)
- Forcipomyia saltensis (Cavalieri, 1962)
- Forcipomyia saltivaga Skuse, 1889
- Forcipomyia samoensis (Edwards, 1928)
- Forcipomyia sanctaeclarae Wirth, 1952
- Forcipomyia sanguinolenta Kieffer, 1925
- Forcipomyia santosi Remm, 1981
- Forcipomyia sauteri Kieffer, 1912
- Forcipomyia saxicola Lien, 1991
- Forcipomyia sayhuequei Marino & Spinelli, 2004
- Forcipomyia scapularis Goetghebuer, 1933
- Forcipomyia scitula Goetghebuer, 1935
- Forcipomyia scorpio Debenham, 1987
- Forcipomyia scurra Debenham, 1987
- Forcipomyia sector Debenham, 1987
- Forcipomyia semihamata Debenham, 1987
- Forcipomyia seminole Wirth, 1976
- Forcipomyia semirustica Remm & Zhogolev, 1968
- Forcipomyia semota Debenham, 1987
- Forcipomyia sensillata Clastrier, 1983
- Forcipomyia separatim Liu, Ge & Liu, 1996
- Forcipomyia serridentata Debenham, 1983
- Forcipomyia serrulifimbria Tokunaga, 1959
- Forcipomyia setigera Saunders, 1959
- Forcipomyia setosicrus (Kieffer, 1906)
- Forcipomyia sexannulata Clastrier, 1983
- Forcipomyia sexvittata Wirth, 1956
- Forcipomyia shannoni (Ingram & Macfie, 1931)
- Forcipomyia sibirica (Buyanova, 1962)
- Forcipomyia sibmurina Remm, 1980
- Forcipomyia sihlwaldensis Delecolle & Schiegg, 1999
- Forcipomyia similis Liu & Yu, 1997
- Forcipomyia simulans Johannsen, 1931
- Forcipomyia sinuosa Dow and Wirth, 1972
- Forcipomyia sirycta (Yu & Liu, 2000)
- Forcipomyia skiaphila (Clastrier, 1960)
- Forcipomyia skusei Debenham, 1987
- Forcipomyia soibelzoni Marino & Spinelli, 2001
- Forcipomyia solonensis Wirth, 1951
- Forcipomyia solutus Liu, Yan, Liu, Hao, Liu & Yu, 2001
- Forcipomyia somuncurensis Marino & Spinelli, 2001
- Forcipomyia sonora Wirth, 1952
- Forcipomyia soriai Wirth, 1991
- Forcipomyia spangleri Meillon & Wirth, 1980
- Forcipomyia spatulifera Saunders, 1956
- Forcipomyia spatuligera Macfie, 1949
- Forcipomyia sphagnophila Kieffer, 1925
- Forcipomyia spiculata Sinha, Mazumdar & Chaudhuri, 2003
- Forcipomyia spilmani Meillon & Wirth, 1980
- Forcipomyia spinipenis Tokunaga, 1959
- Forcipomyia spinosa Saunders, 1956
- Forcipomyia spinuliforceps Tokunaga, 1959
- Forcipomyia squamianulipes Tokunaga & Murachi, 1959
- Forcipomyia squamigera Kieffer & Thienemann, 1916
- Forcipomyia squamipennis Ingram & Macfie, 1924
- Forcipomyia squamipes (Coquillett, 1902)
- Forcipomyia squamitarsata (Clastrier, 1935)
- Forcipomyia squamithorax Clastrier, 1972
- Forcipomyia squamitibia Lutz, 1914
- Forcipomyia squamitibialis Tokunaga, 1959
- Forcipomyia squamosa Lutz, 1914
- Forcipomyia stabilis Sen & Gupta, 1968
- Forcipomyia stami Wirth & Ratanaworabhan, 1978
- Forcipomyia statirae Meillon, 1936
- Forcipomyia stelechos Debenham, 1987
- Forcipomyia stellaris (Yu & Wirth, 1997)
- Forcipomyia stenammatis (Long, 1902)
- Forcipomyia stewarti Meillon & Downes, 1986
- Forcipomyia stigmatipennis Tokunaga, 1959
- Forcipomyia stimulans (Meijere, 1909)
- Forcipomyia striaticornis (Kieffer, 1918)
- Forcipomyia stylifera (Lutz, 1913)
- Forcipomyia subauronitens Tokunaga, 1940
- Forcipomyia suberis Clastrier, 1956
- Forcipomyia subfrigidus Liu, Yan, Liu, Hao, Liu & Yu, 2001
- Forcipomyia subitilis Johannsen, 1931
- Forcipomyia submurina Remm, 1980
- Forcipomyia subnitida (Skuse, 1889)
- Forcipomyia subruralis Liu, Yan, Liu, Hao, Liu & Yu, 2001
- Forcipomyia subspadicifascia Tokunaga & Murachi, 1959
- Forcipomyia subulipenis Sinha, Mazumdar & Chaudhuri, 2003
- Forcipomyia sudanensis Macfie, 1947
- Forcipomyia supplex Debenham, 1987
- Forcipomyia surculus Liu, Yan, Liu, Hao, Liu & Yu, 2001
- Forcipomyia swezeyana Tokunaga & Murachi, 1959
- Forcipomyia swezeyi Edwards, 1928
- Forcipomyia taipei Lien, 1991
- Forcipomyia taiwana (Shiraki, 1913)
- Forcipomyia takahashii Tokunaga, 1940
- Forcipomyia tambunana (Yu & Wirth, 1997)
- Forcipomyia tangae Kieffer, 1913
- Forcipomyia tapleyi Ingram & Macfie, 1931
- Forcipomyia taragui Marino, Spinelli & Cazorla, 2002
- Forcipomyia tasmani Macfie, 1932
- Forcipomyia tauffiebi Clastrier, 1960
- Forcipomyia taurus Debenham, 1987
- Forcipomyia tavetae Kieffer, 1913
- Forcipomyia tawauensis (Yu & Wirth, 1997)
- Forcipomyia tegula Liu & Yu, 1997
- Forcipomyia tehuelche Marino & Spinelli, 2004
- Forcipomyia tenuichela Dow and Wirth, 1972
- Forcipomyia tenuidentis (Yu & Wirth, 1997)
- Forcipomyia tenuiforceps Macfie, 1939
- Forcipomyia tenuis (Winnertz, 1852)
- Forcipomyia tenuisquampies Wirth, 1952
- Forcipomyia terestris Saunders, 1964
- Forcipomyia testudo Debenham, 1987
- Forcipomyia testuedo Debenham, 1987
- Forcipomyia tetraclada Kieffer, 1912
- Forcipomyia tetrasticta (Kieffer, 1919)
- Forcipomyia tettigonaris Wirth & Castner, 1990
- Forcipomyia texana (Long, 1902)
- Forcipomyia thabinana Meillon, 1959
- Forcipomyia theobromae Kieffer, 1912
- Forcipomyia thienemanni Kieffer, 1912
- Forcipomyia thiensis Clastrier & Delecolle, 1993
- Forcipomyia thomasi Clastrier & Wirth, 1995
- Forcipomyia tibialis Remm, 1961
- Forcipomyia tienshanica Remm, 1980
- Forcipomyia tigripes Ingram & Macfie, 1924
- Forcipomyia tillierorum Clastrier & Delecolle, 1991
- Forcipomyia tinia Krivosheina, 1968
- Forcipomyia tipulivora Macfie, 1936
- Forcipomyia titillans (Winnertz, 1852)
- Forcipomyia tiwaka Clastrier & Delecolle, 1993
- Forcipomyia tokunagai (Oka et Asahina, 1948)
- Forcipomyia tomaculorum Debenham, 1987
- Forcipomyia tonicus Liu, Yan, Liu, Hao, Liu & Yu, 2001
- Forcipomyia tonnoiri (Goetghebuer, 1920)
- Forcipomyia tortor Debenham, 1987
- Forcipomyia tortula Liu, Yan, Liu, Hao, Liu & Yu, 2001
- Forcipomyia tortuosa Debenham, 1987
- Forcipomyia totus Liu, Yan, Liu, Hao, Liu & Yu, 2001
- Forcipomyia townesi Wirth, 1952
- Forcipomyia townsendi Knab, 1915
- Forcipomyia townsvillensis (Taylor, 1918)
- Forcipomyia transversalis Clastrier & Delecolle, 1991
- Forcipomyia triclotae Clastrier & Delecolle, 1991
- Forcipomyia trigonata Johannsen, 1931
- Forcipomyia trilineata Goetghebuer, 1934
- Forcipomyia trinidadensis Saunders, 1964
- Forcipomyia trinotata Kieffer, 1913
- Forcipomyia tristicta Kieffer, 1913
- Forcipomyia tristis (Meigen, 1830)
- Forcipomyia tsacasi Clastrier, 1983
- Forcipomyia tsutsumii Tokunaga, 1960
- Forcipomyia tuberculata Saunders, 1956
- Forcipomyia tugelensis Meillon, 1959
- Forcipomyia tumulus Debenham, 1987
- Forcipomyia turanorustica Remm, 1980
- Forcipomyia turgepeda Yu & Liu, 1982
- Forcipomyia tuthilli Tokunaga, 1959
- Forcipomyia tuzeti Huttel & Huttel, 1952
- Forcipomyia tympanista Debenham, 1987
- Forcipomyia tzaneenensis Meillon & Wirth, 1979
- Forcipomyia uncusidentis (Liu, Yan & Liu, 1996)
- Forcipomyia uncusipenis Yu & Zhang, 1982
- Forcipomyia unica Bystrak and Wirth, 1978
- Forcipomyia unifascicornis Tokunaga, 1959
- Forcipomyia unimaculata Sinha, Mazumdar & Chaudhuri, 2003
- Forcipomyia unitheca Tokunaga, 1959
- Forcipomyia unituberculata Tokunaga, 1959
- Forcipomyia univesicula Macfie, 1939
- Forcipomyia uramaensis Spinelli & Dippolito, 1995
- Forcipomyia urbana Goetghebuer, 1937
- Forcipomyia urnigera Kieffer, 1924
- Forcipomyia ursuli Remm, 1972
- Forcipomyia usingeri Wirth & Spinelli, 1993
- Forcipomyia ussurica Remm, 1971
- Forcipomyia utae Knab, 1915
- Forcipomyia valleensis Clastrier & Wirth, 1995
- Forcipomyia vandiemeni Debenham & Wirth, 1984
- Forcipomyia varicolor Saunders, 1956
- Forcipomyia variicrus Kieffer, 1913
- Forcipomyia varipennis Wirth and Williams, 1957
- Forcipomyia velox (Winnertz, 1852)
- Forcipomyia venetiana (Kieffer, 1919)
- Forcipomyia ventralis Borkent, 1997
- Forcipomyia venusta Ingram & Macfie, 1924
- Forcipomyia vernocheti (Clastrier, 1959)
- Forcipomyia vernoni Clastrier & Wirth, 1995
- Forcipomyia veroensis Wirth and Messersmith, 1971
- Forcipomyia vesicula Meillon & Wirth, 1983
- Forcipomyia vespa Debenham, 1987
- Forcipomyia vexans (Meijere, 1909)
- Forcipomyia vexillarius Debenham, 1987
- Forcipomyia villiersi Clastrier, 1972
- Forcipomyia villosa (Macfie, 1934)
- Forcipomyia virgula Yu & Wen, 1985
- Forcipomyia viridis Clastrier & Delecolle, 1991
- Forcipomyia vittata Tokunaga, 1940
- Forcipomyia wahgi Debenham, 1987
- Forcipomyia waldenia Meillon, 1940
- Forcipomyia waldermari Szadziewski, 1983
- Forcipomyia walschaertsi Gosseries, 1989
- Forcipomyia wansoni Meillon, 1939
- Forcipomyia warreni Meillon & Wirth, 1981
- Forcipomyia watshami Meillon & Wirth, 1989
- Forcipomyia weemsi Wirth & Spinelli, 1993
- Forcipomyia weihaiensis Xue & Yu, 1998
- Forcipomyia werneri Wirth & Spinelli, 1993
- Forcipomyia wheeleri (Long, 1902)
- Forcipomyia williamsi Marino & Spinelli, 1999
- Forcipomyia willisa Debenham, 1987
- Forcipomyia willisi Debenham, 1987
- Forcipomyia willistoni Wirth, 1971
- Forcipomyia winderi Wirth, 1991
- Forcipomyia wirthi Saunders, 1956
- Forcipomyia wirthiana Szadziewski, 1983
- Forcipomyia wulai Lien, 1991
- Forcipomyia wuxiensis Liu, Yan, Liu, Hao, Liu & Yu, 2001
- Forcipomyia wygodzinskyi Cavalieri, 1961
- Forcipomyia xichangensis Liu, Yan, Liu, Hao, Liu & Yu, 2001
- Forcipomyia yamana Marino & Spinelli, 2001
- Forcipomyia yamauchii Tokunaga, 1940
- Forcipomyia yapensis Tokunaga & Murachi, 1959
- Forcipomyia yirrkala Debenham, 1987
- Forcipomyia yoshimurai Tokunaga, 1940
- Forcipomyia yuani Yu, Liang, Chen, He & Su, 2007
- Forcipomyia yui (Liu, Yan & Liu, 1996)
- Forcipomyia yungurara Debenham, 1987
- Forcipomyia zeteki Wirth & Dow, 1972
- Forcipomyia zhangmuensis Liu, Yan, Liu, Hao, Liu & Yu, 2001
- Forcipomyia zhenbaodaoensis Yu & Liu, 1987
- Forcipomyia zhongshanensis Liu, Yan, Liu, Hao, Liu & Yu, 2001
- Forcipomyia zonaphalla Yu & Liu, 1982
- Forcipomyia zonogaster Ingram & Macfie, 1931
