= Hermetia melanderi =

Scientific classification
- Kingdom: Animalia
- Phylum: Arthropoda
- Clade: Pancrustacea
- Class: Insecta
- Order: Diptera
- Family: Stratiomyidae
- Subfamily: Hermetiinae
- Genus: Hermetia
- Species: H. melanderi

Binomial name
- Hermetia melanderi James & Wirth, 1967

Species of fly

Hermetia melanderi is a species of soldier fly in the family Stratiomyidae.

== Distribution ==
United States, Mexico.
