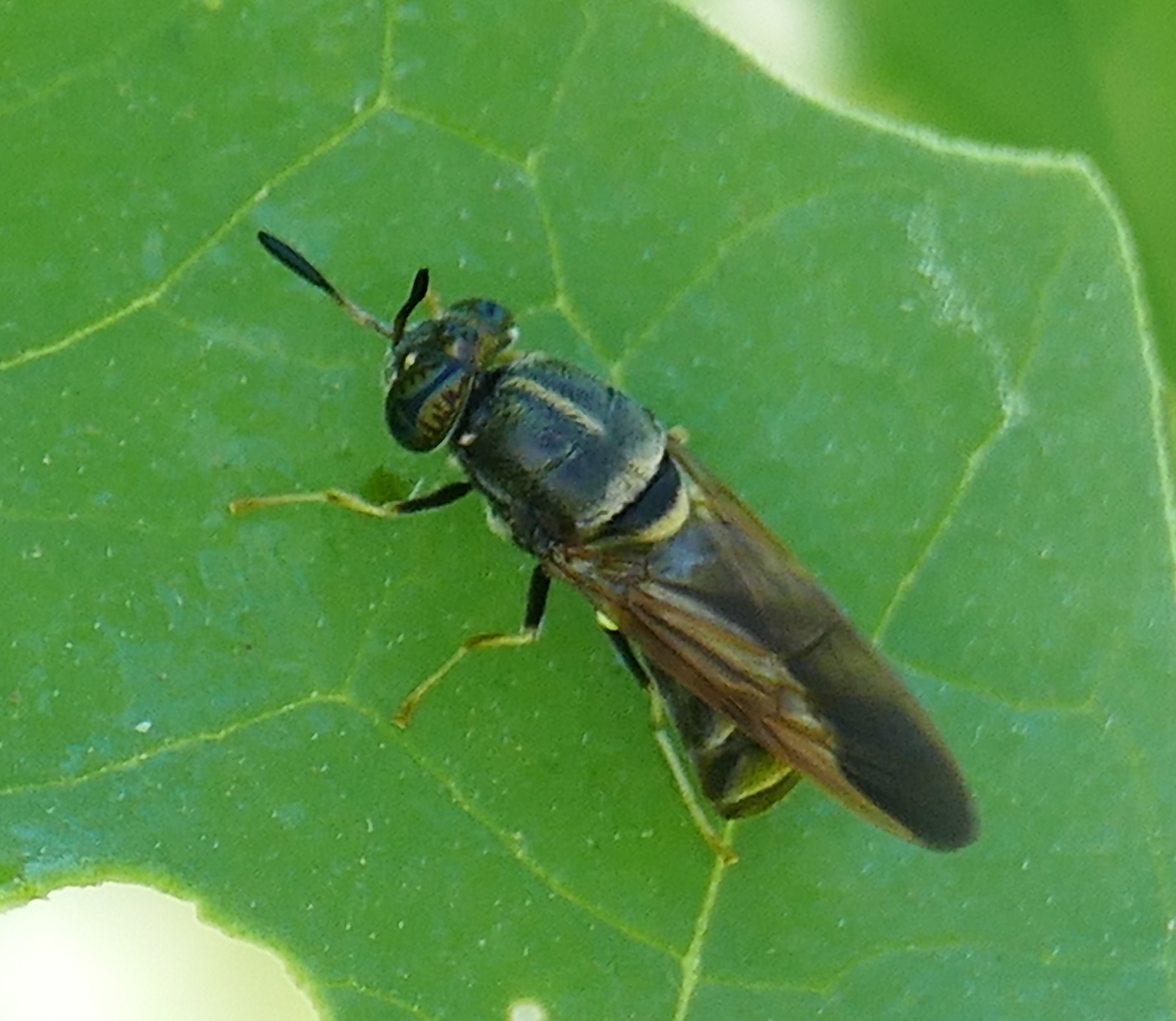
- Hermetia subpellucida, Arizona

Scientific classification
- Kingdom: Animalia
- Phylum: Arthropoda
- Clade: Pancrustacea
- Class: Insecta
- Order: Diptera
- Family: Stratiomyidae
- Subfamily: Hermetiinae
- Genus: Hermetia
- Species: H. subpellucida

Binomial name
- Hermetia subpellucida James & Wirth, 1967

= Hermetia subpellucida =

Species of fly

Hermetia subpellucida is a species of soldier fly in the family Stratiomyidae.

== Distribution ==
United States, Mexico.
