= Hermetia crabro =

Scientific classification
- Kingdom: Animalia
- Phylum: Arthropoda
- Clade: Pancrustacea
- Class: Insecta
- Order: Diptera
- Family: Stratiomyidae
- Subfamily: Hermetiinae
- Genus: Hermetia
- Species: H. crabro

Binomial name
- Hermetia crabro Osten Sacken, 1886

Synonyms
- Acrodesmia fimbriata Lindner, 1931

Species of fly

Hermetia crabro is a species of soldier fly in the family Stratiomyidae.

== Distribution ==
Guatemala, Honduras.
