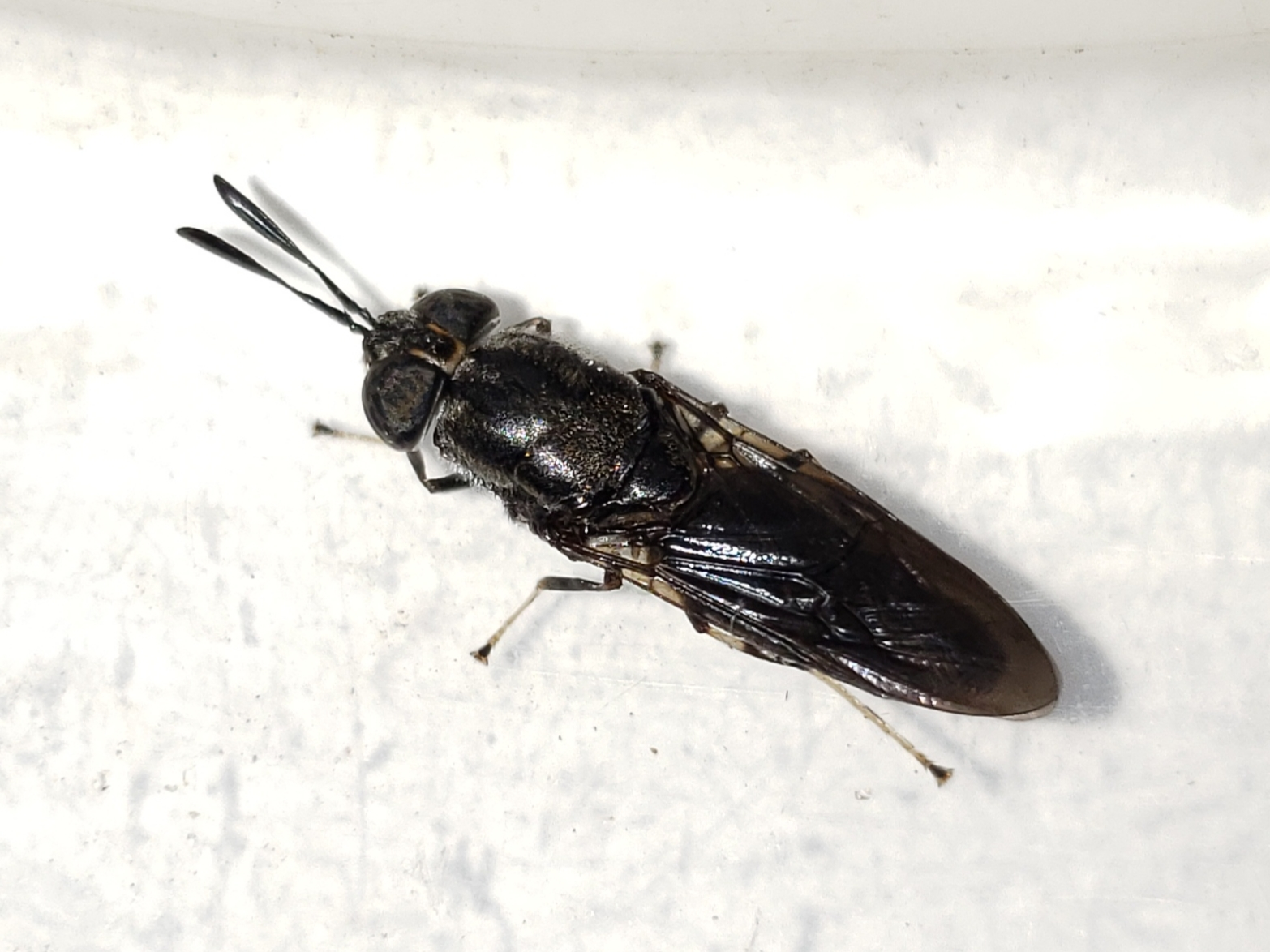

Scientific classification
- Kingdom: Animalia
- Phylum: Arthropoda
- Clade: Pancrustacea
- Class: Insecta
- Order: Diptera
- Family: Stratiomyidae
- Subfamily: Hermetiinae
- Genus: Hermetia
- Species: H. sexmaculata

Binomial name
- Hermetia sexmaculata Macquart, 1834

Synonyms
- Hermetia nucis James, 1935

= Hermetia sexmaculata =

Species of fly

Hermetia sexmaculata is a species of soldier fly in the family Stratiomyidae.

== Distribution ==
United States (including Puerto Rico), Brazil, Cuba, Dominican Republic.
