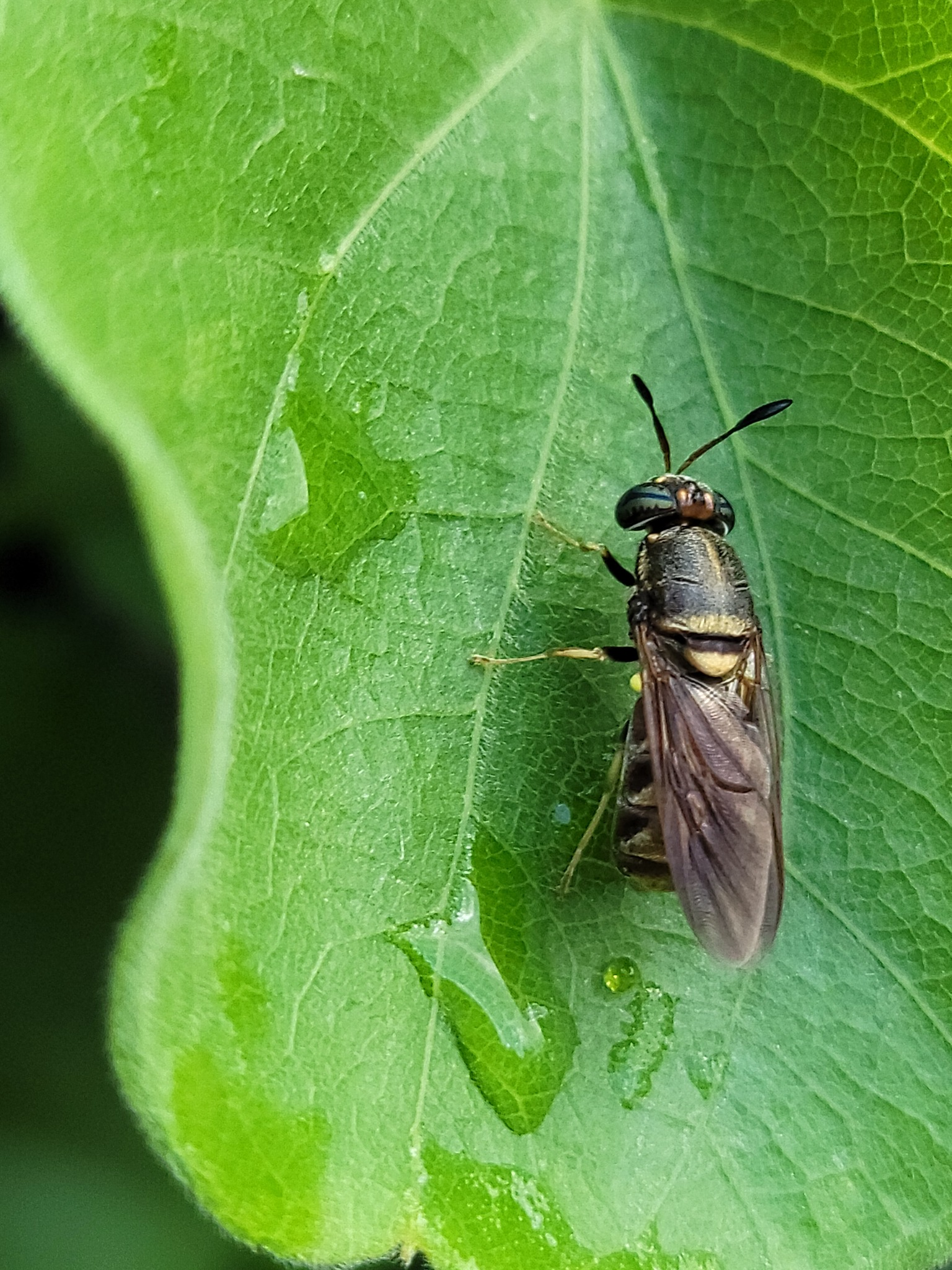

Scientific classification
- Kingdom: Animalia
- Phylum: Arthropoda
- Clade: Pancrustacea
- Class: Insecta
- Order: Diptera
- Family: Stratiomyidae
- Subfamily: Hermetiinae
- Genus: Hermetia
- Species: H. chrysopila

Binomial name
- Hermetia chrysopila Loew, 1872

= Hermetia chrysopila =

Species of fly

Hermetia chrysopila is a species of soldier fly in the family Stratiomyidae.

== Distribution ==
Mexico, United States.
