= Hermetia amboyna =

Scientific classification
- Kingdom: Animalia
- Phylum: Arthropoda
- Clade: Pancrustacea
- Class: Insecta
- Order: Diptera
- Family: Stratiomyidae
- Subfamily: Hermetiinae
- Genus: Hermetia
- Species: H. amboyna

Binomial name
- Hermetia amboyna Woodley, 2001

Synonyms
- Hermetia rufiventris Walker, 1860

Species of fly

Hermetia amboyna is a species of soldier fly in the family Stratiomyidae.

== Distribution ==
Maluku Islands.
