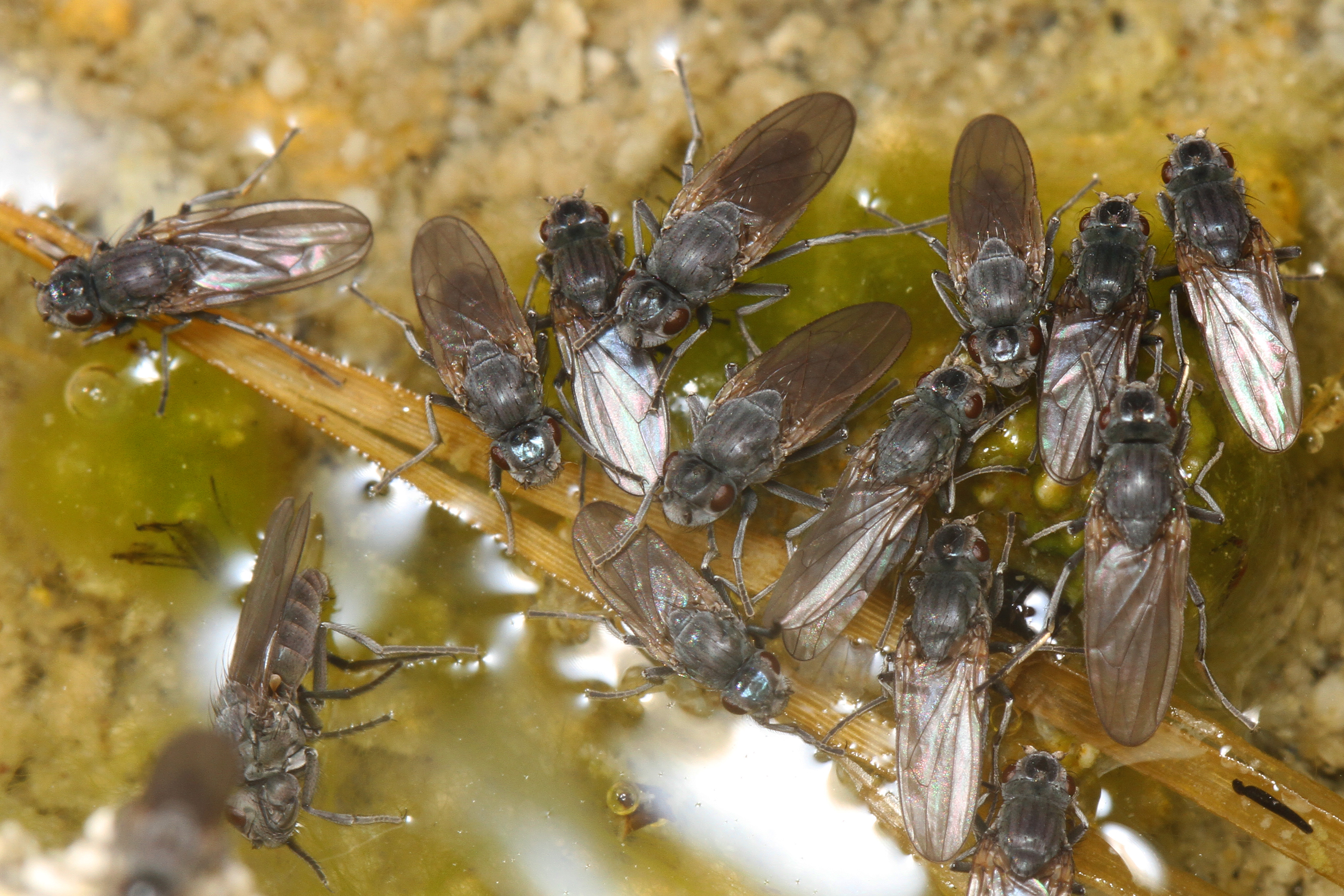
- Ephydra hians at Mono Lake

Scientific classification
- Domain: Eukaryota
- Kingdom: Animalia
- Phylum: Arthropoda
- Class: Insecta
- Order: Diptera
- Family: Ephydridae
- Subfamily: Ephydrinae
- Tribe: Ephydrini
- Genus: Ephydra; Fallén, 1810

Synonyms
- Ephidra Rondani, 1856

= Ephydra =

Genus of flies

Ephydra is a genus of flies belonging to the family Ephydridae.

The genus has cosmopolitan distribution.

== Species ==
- Ephydra acrostichalis Malloch, 1925
- Ephydra acutata Hu & Yang, 2002
- Ephydra afghanica Dahl, 1961
- Ephydra alandica Frey, 1909
- Ephydra attica Becker, 1896
- Ephydra auripes Aldrich, 1912
- Ephydra basilaris Waltl, 1837
- Ephydra bivittata Loew, 1860
- Ephydra breva Hu & Yang, 2002
- Ephydra brevis (Walker, 1858)
- Ephydra bruesi Cresson, 1934
- Ephydra currani Wirth, 1971
- Ephydra dorsala Hu & Yang, 2002
- Ephydra flavipes (Macquart, 1843)
- Ephydra glauca Meigen, 1830
- Ephydra goedeni Wirth, 1971
- Ephydra gracilis Packard, 1871
- Ephydra heijingensis Hu & Yang, 2002
- Ephydra hejingensis Hu & Yang, 2002
- Ephydra hians Say, 1830
- Ephydra japonica Miyagi, 1966
- Ephydra lata (Walker, 1858)
- Ephydra macellaria Egger, 1862
- Ephydra magadiensis Wirth, 1975
- Ephydra mexicana Cresson, 1934
- Ephydra millbrae Jones, 1906
- Ephydra murina Wirth, 1975
- Ephydra nana (Walker, 1858)
- Ephydra niveiceps Cresson, 1916
- Ephydra novae-zealandiae Tonnoir & Malloch, 1926
- Ephydra obscuripes Loew, 1866
- Ephydra ochrostoma Brullé, 1833
- Ephydra opaca Loew, 1856
- Ephydra orichalcea Gimmerthal, 1847
- Ephydra packardi Wirth, 1971
- Ephydra pectinulata Cresson, 1916
- Ephydra pseudomurina Krivosheina, 1983
- Ephydra riparia Fallén, 1813
- Ephydra scholtzi Becker, 1896
- Ephydra shalatinensis El-Moursy, Negm, El-Hawagry & Ebrahim, 2006
- Ephydra similis Tonnoir & Malloch, 1926
- Ephydra stuckenbergi Wirth, 1975
- Ephydra subopaca Loew, 1864
- Ephydra thermophila Cresson, 1934
- Ephydra tibetensis Cresson, 1934
- Ephydra urmiana Gunther, 1899
- Ephydra usingeri Wirth, 1976
- Ephydra yangi Hu & Yang, 2002
