= Hermetia relicta =

Scientific classification
- Kingdom: Animalia
- Phylum: Arthropoda
- Clade: Pancrustacea
- Class: Insecta
- Order: Diptera
- Family: Stratiomyidae
- Subfamily: Hermetiinae
- Genus: Hermetia
- Species: H. relicta

Binomial name
- Hermetia relicta Osten Sacken, 1886

Synonyms
- Hermetia reinhardi James, 1935

Species of fly

Hermetia relicta is a species of soldier fly in the family Stratiomyidae.

== Distribution ==
Panama.
