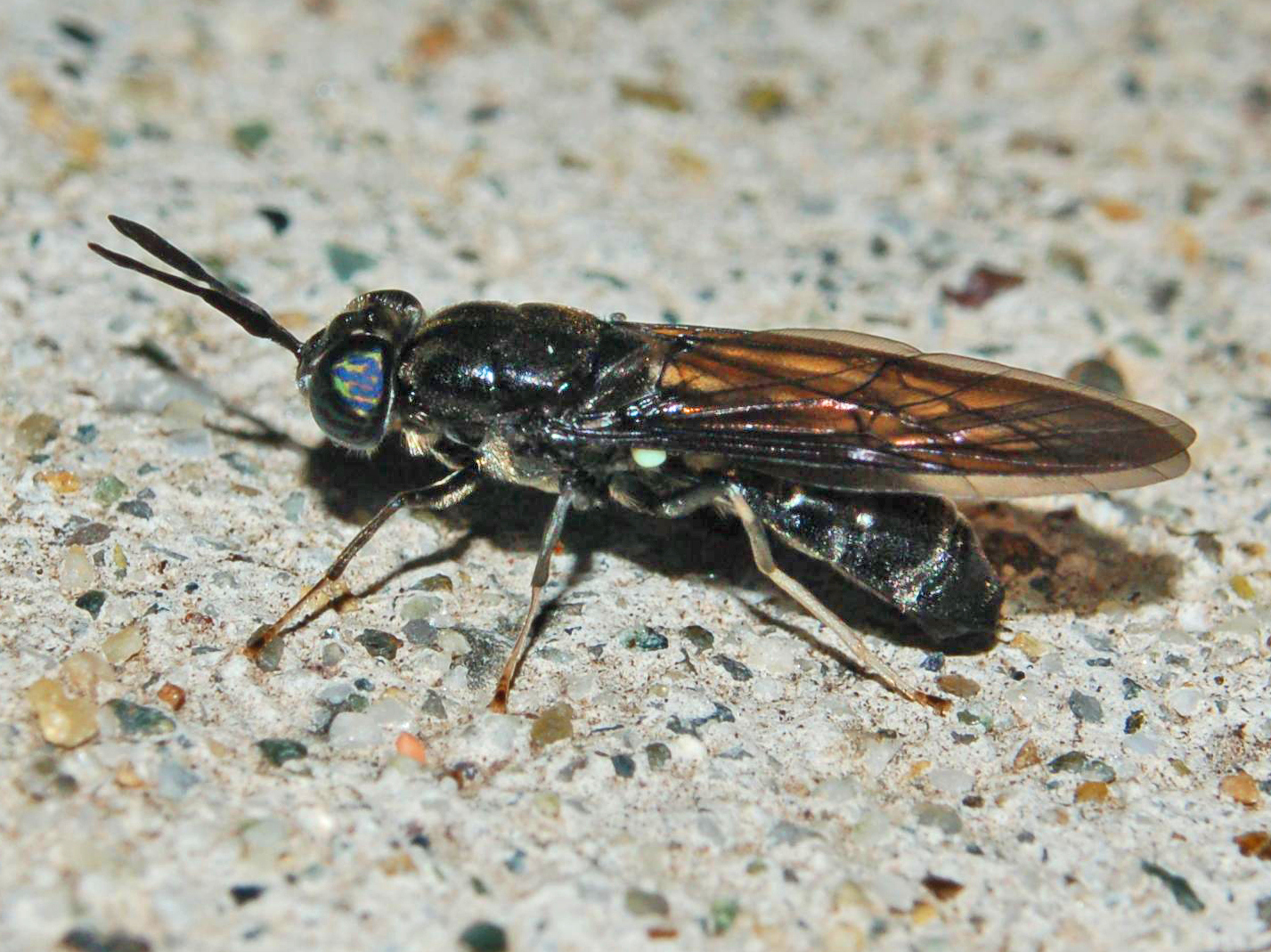
- Hermetia illucens

Scientific classification
- Kingdom: Animalia
- Phylum: Arthropoda
- Clade: Pancrustacea
- Class: Insecta
- Order: Diptera
- Family: Stratiomyidae
- Subfamily: Hermetiinae
- Genus: Hermetia; Latreille, 1804

Type species
- Musca illucens Linnaeus, 1758

Synonyms
- Thorasena Macquart, 1838; Stenothorax Agassiz, 1846; Massicyta Walker, 1857; Massycyta Loew, 1860; Masicyta Marschall, 1873; Acrodesmia Enderlein, 1914; Scammatocera Enderlein, 1914

= Hermetia =

Genus of flies

Hermetia is a genus of flies of the family Stratiomyidae.

== Species ==
- Hermetia albipoda Woodley, 2001
- Hermetia albitarsis Fabricius, 1805
- Hermetia amboyna Woodley, 2001
- Hermetia amsarii Adisoemarto, 1975
- Hermetia anthidium James, 1967
- Hermetia aurata Bellardi, 1859
- Hermetia aurinotata Lindner, 1935
- Hermetia austeni Lindner, 1937
- Hermetia bathae Woodley & Lessard, 2018
- Hermetia beebei Curran, 1934
- Hermetia bicolor (Walker, 1856)
- Hermetia borneensis Brunetti, 1923
- Hermetia brachygastropsis Fachin & Hauser, 2022
- Hermetia branchystyla Yang, Zhang & Li, 2014
- Hermetia brunettii Lindner, 1937
- Hermetia callifera Lindner, 1928
- Hermetia ceria Williston, 1900
- Hermetia ceriogaster Williston, 1888
- Hermetia cerioides (Walker, 1858)
- Hermetia chrysopila Loew, 1872
- Hermetia cingulatus Greene, 1940
- Hermetia comstocki Williston, 1885
- Hermetia concinna Williston, 1900
- Hermetia condor Lindner, 1951
- Hermetia confidens Adisoemarto, 1975
- Hermetia conjuncta James, 1967
- Hermetia cornithorax (Lindner, 1928)
- Hermetia crabro Osten Sacken, 1886
- Hermetia currani Lindner, 1949
- Hermetia eiseni Townsend, 1895
- Hermetia femoralis (Lindner, 1937)
- Hermetia flavimaculata Yang, Zhang & Li, 2014
- Hermetia flavipes Wiedemann, 1830
- Hermetia flavipes var. aeneipennis Giglio-Tos, 1893
- Hermetia flavoscutata Bigot, 1879
- Hermetia formica Osten Sacken, 1886
- Hermetia fulva Walker, 1854
- Hermetia goncalvesi Albuquerque, 1955
- Hermetia hauseri Lessard & Woodley, 2018
- Hermetia hunteri Coquillett, 1909
- Hermetia illucens (Linnaeus, 1758)
- Hermetia impressa James, 1967
- Hermetia inflata (Walker, 1858)
- Hermetia itatiaiensis Lindner, 1973
- Hermetia jamesi Lindner, 1977
- Hermetia laeta Meijere, 1904
- Hermetia laglaizei Bigot, 1887
- Hermetia lativentris Bellardi, 1859
- Hermetia malayana Brunetti, 1923
- Hermetia melanderi James & Wirth, 1967
- Hermetia melanogaster Yang, Zhang & Li, 2014
- Hermetia myieriades Speiser, 1913
- Hermetia nigra Meijere, 1916
- Hermetia nigricornis James & Wirth, 1967
- Hermetia olympiae Lessard & Woodley, 2018
- Hermetia pahangensis Rozkošný & Kozánek, 2006
- Hermetia pallidipes Hill, 1919
- Hermetia palmivora James, 1972
- Hermetia pectoralis Wiedemann, 1824
- Hermetia pennicornis Bezzi, 1908
- Hermetia pterocausta Osten Sacken, 1886
- Hermetia pulchra Wiedemann, 1830
- Hermetia relicta Osten Sacken, 1886
- Hermetia remittens Walker, 1859
- Hermetia rufitarsis Macquart, 1846
- Hermetia ryckmani James & Wirth, 1967
- Hermetia samoensis Ricardo, 1929
- Hermetia sexmaculata Macquart, 1834
- Hermetia sphecodes Curran, 1934
- Hermetia subpellucida James & Wirth, 1967
- Hermetia teevani Curran, 1934
- Hermetia transmaculata Yang, Zhang & Li, 2014
- Hermetia virescens (Enderlein, 1914)
- Hermetia virgata Lindner, 1949
- Hermetia woodleyi Rozkošný, 2006
