= Forcipomyia squamipennis =

Scientific classification
- Kingdom: Animalia
- Phylum: Arthropoda
- Class: Insecta
- Order: Diptera
- Family: Ceratopogonidae
- Genus: Forcipomyia
- Species: F. squamipennis

Binomial name
- Forcipomyia squamipennis Ingram & Macfie, 1924

Species of fly

Forcipomyia squamipennis is a biting midge species in the genus Forcipomyia. It is an important pollinator of cacao trees (Theobroma cacao) in Ghana, and other related midges pollinate the tree in other parts of the tropics.

== Life cycle ==
Forcipomyia squamipennis is an important pollinator of the cacao tree Theobroma cacao in Ghana, not because it pollinates more effectively than other insects but because it is so numerous in cacao plantations. The population is greatest in the rainy season. Adult midges spend the day in shady spots such as between the buttress roots of large trees, in crevices in logs, in hollow stumps or in piles of husk debris. They emerge at variable times of day to swarm near their hiding locations, and disperse in the late afternoons and early mornings. Most midges do not move further than about 6 m (20 ft). The females lay batches of up to about ninety eggs on damp piles of plant debris. The eggs hatch after two or three days and the larvae pass through four instar stages before pupating at about twelve days. The adults survive for about a week and there are thought to be about twelve generations of the midge per year. Both sexes feed on the pollen of the cacao flower, but four times more males visit the flowers than do females.

== Cacao pollination ==
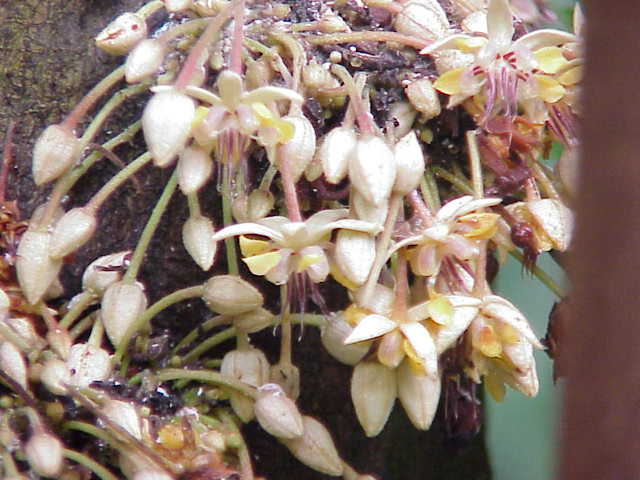
Cacao flowers profusely

Midges in the family Ceratopogonidae are believed to be the most important pollinators of cacao globally, particularly the larger members of the family. The tree flowers profusely but few flowers set, particularly in the dry season; when the tree is under water stress all flowers are dropped within about five days. Successful pollination requires the deposition of at least 35 suitable pollen grains on the receptive parts of the flower, and is dependent on the season.
