= Hermetia comstocki =

Scientific classification
- Kingdom: Animalia
- Phylum: Arthropoda
- Clade: Pancrustacea
- Class: Insecta
- Order: Diptera
- Family: Stratiomyidae
- Subfamily: Hermetiinae
- Genus: Hermetia
- Species: H. comstocki

Binomial name
- Hermetia comstocki Williston, 1885

Synonyms
- Hermetia comstocki ssp. mexicana James, 1967

Species of fly

Hermetia comstocki, the agave fly, is a species of soldier fly in the family Stratiomyidae.

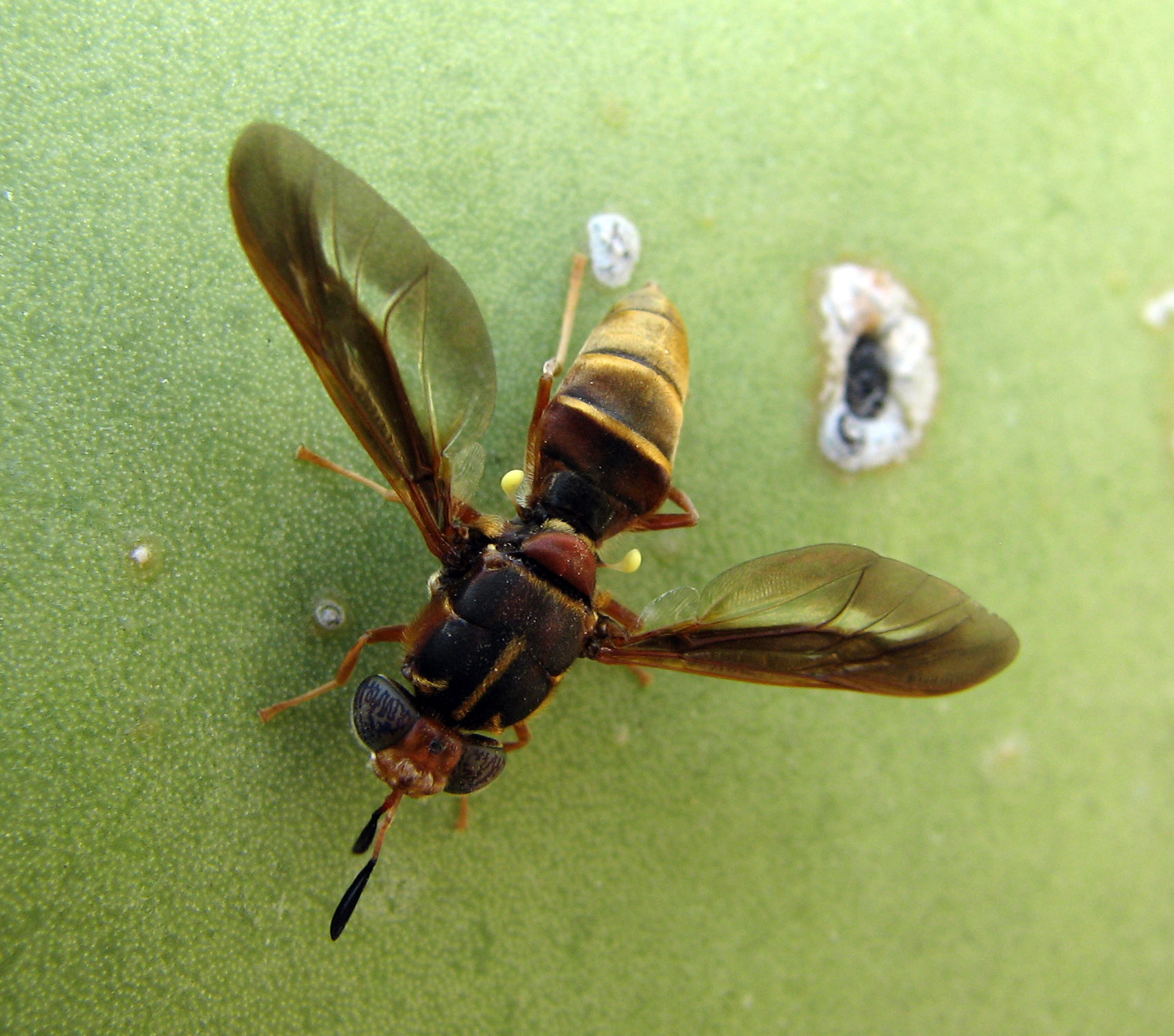
Agave fly, Hermetia comstocki

== Distribution ==
Mexico, United States.
