= Forcipomyia pluvialis =

Scientific classification
- Domain: Eukaryota
- Kingdom: Animalia
- Phylum: Arthropoda
- Class: Insecta
- Order: Diptera
- Family: Ceratopogonidae
- Genus: Forcipomyia
- Species: F. pluvialis

Binomial name
- Forcipomyia pluvialis Malloch, 1923

Species of fly

Forcipomyia pluvialis is a species of biting midges (flies in the family Ceratopogonidae).
