= Chaetosargus =

Scientific classification
- Kingdom: Animalia
- Phylum: Arthropoda
- Class: Insecta
- Order: Diptera
- Family: Stratiomyidae
- Subfamily: Hermetiinae
- Genus: Chaetosargus; Röder, 1894

Type species
- Sargus hirticornis Wiedemann, 1830

Genus of flies

Chaetosargus is a genus of flies in the family Stratiomyidae.

== Species ==
- Chaetosargus hirticornis (Wiedemann, 1830)
- Chaetosargus robustus (Brauer, 1882)
- Chaetosargus secundus (Albuquerque, 1955)
- Chaetosargus seitzi (Lindner, 1928)
