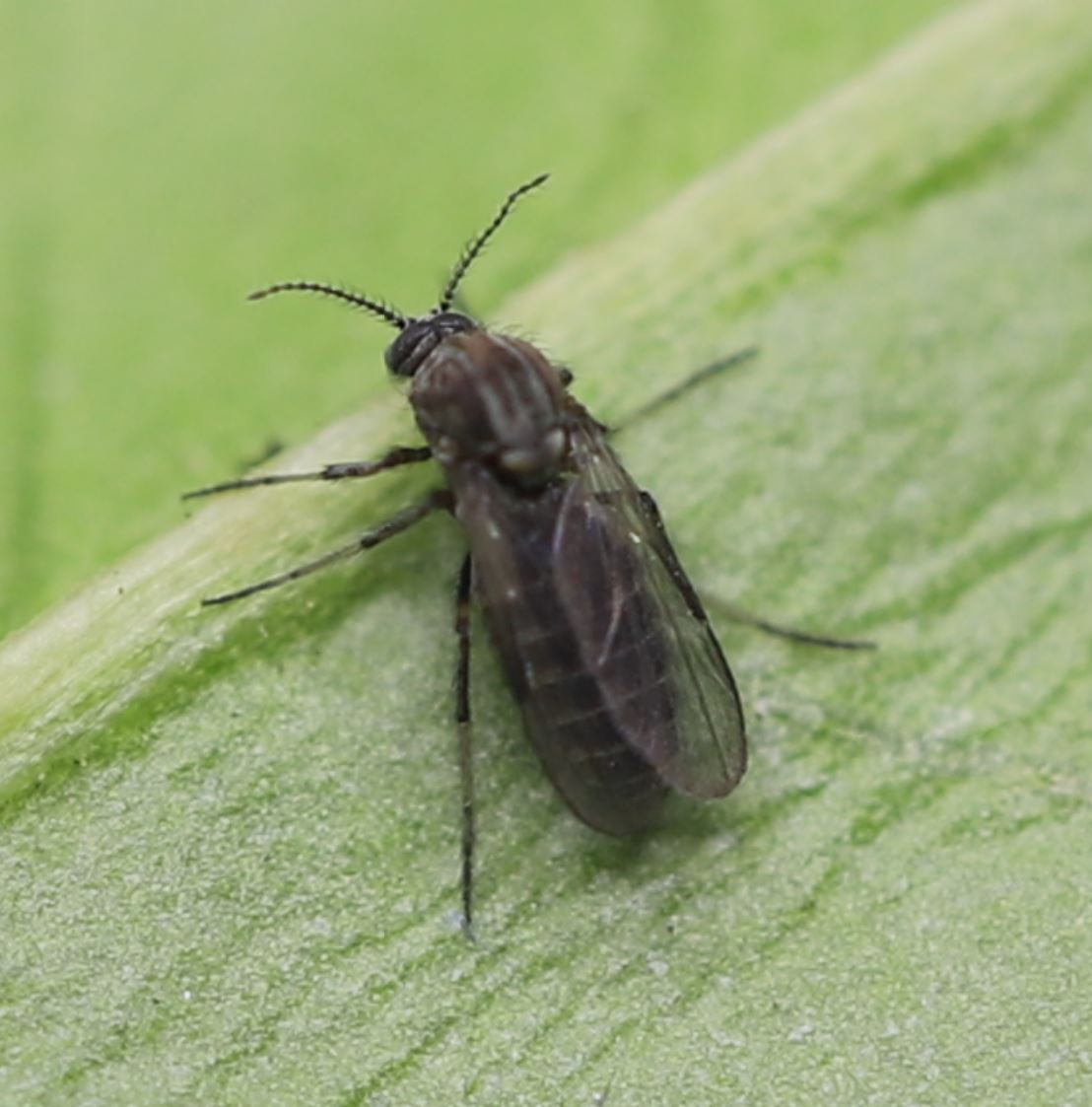
- Dasyhelea incisurata, female

Scientific classification
- Kingdom: Animalia
- Phylum: Arthropoda
- Clade: Pancrustacea
- Class: Insecta
- Order: Diptera
- Family: Ceratopogonidae
- Subfamily: Forcipomyiinae; Lenz, 1934
- Genus: Dasyhelea; Kieffer, 1911

Species
- See list

= Dasyhelea =

Genus of insects

Dasyhelea is a genus of biting midges. Larvae of species in this genus are characterized by an anal segment with retractile posterior prolegs. Larvae are aquatic and adults do not feed on vertebrate blood, nor do they prey on other insects. They take nectar only, an unusual feeding behavior within the Ceratopogonidae.
