= Chaetohermetia =

Scientific classification
- Kingdom: Animalia
- Phylum: Arthropoda
- Class: Insecta
- Order: Diptera
- Family: Stratiomyidae
- Subfamily: Hermetiinae
- Genus: Chaetohermetia; Lindner, 1929

Type species
- Chaetohermetia apicalis Lindner, 1929

Genus of flies

Chaetohermetia is a genus of flies in the family Stratiomyidae.

== Species ==
- Chaetohermetia apicalis Lindner, 1929
- Chaetohermetia insularis James, 1977
