= Forcipomyia fuliginosa =

Scientific classification
- Domain: Eukaryota
- Kingdom: Animalia
- Phylum: Arthropoda
- Class: Insecta
- Order: Diptera
- Family: Ceratopogonidae
- Genus: Forcipomyia
- Species: F. fuliginosa

Binomial name
- Forcipomyia fuliginosa (Meigen, 1818)

Synonyms
- Ceratopogon coquilletti Kieffer, 1917; Ceratopogon fuliginosa Meigen, 1818; Forcipomyia brookmani Wirth, 1952; Forcipomyia erucicida Knab, 1914

Species of fly

Forcipomyia fuliginosa is a species of biting midges (flies in the family Ceratopogonidae).
