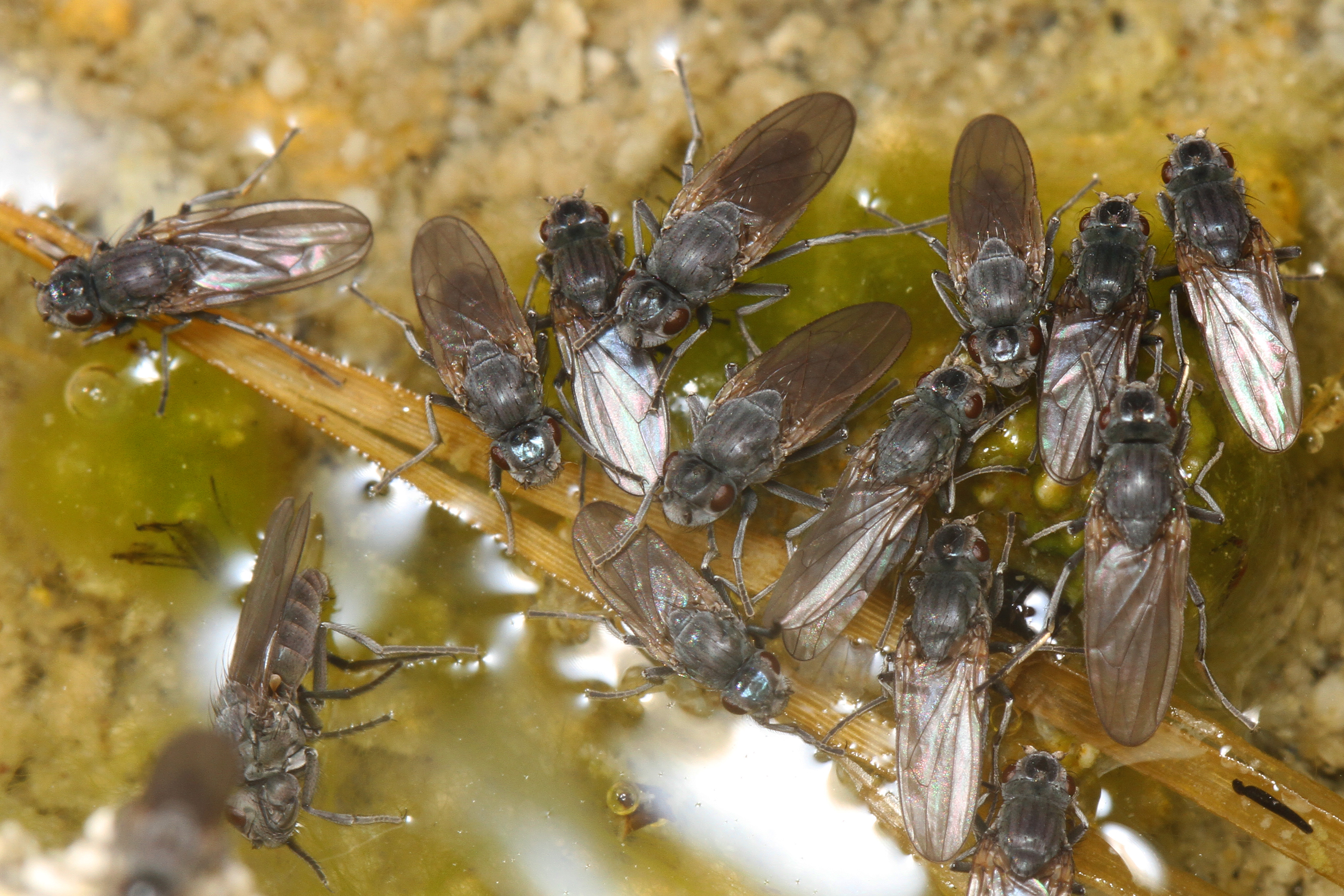
- Ephydra hians at Mono Lake

Scientific classification
- Kingdom: Animalia
- Phylum: Arthropoda
- Class: Insecta
- Order: Diptera
- Family: Ephydridae
- Tribe: Ephydrini
- Genus: Ephydra
- Species: E. hians

Binomial name
- Ephydra hians Say, 1830

Synonyms
- Cirrula hians; Hydropyrus hians

= Ephydra hians =

Species of fly

Ephydra hians, commonly known as the alkali fly, is a species of fly in the family Ephydridae, the brine flies.

== Description ==
The body of the adult is dark brown, and roughly 4–7 millimeters (0.16–0.28 in) in length. The thorax reflects a metallic greenish or bluish color, and the wings are smokey brown.

The larva contains a membranous cephalic area, and the rest of the body is divided into 3 thoracic segments and 8 abdominal segments.

== Distribution and habitat ==
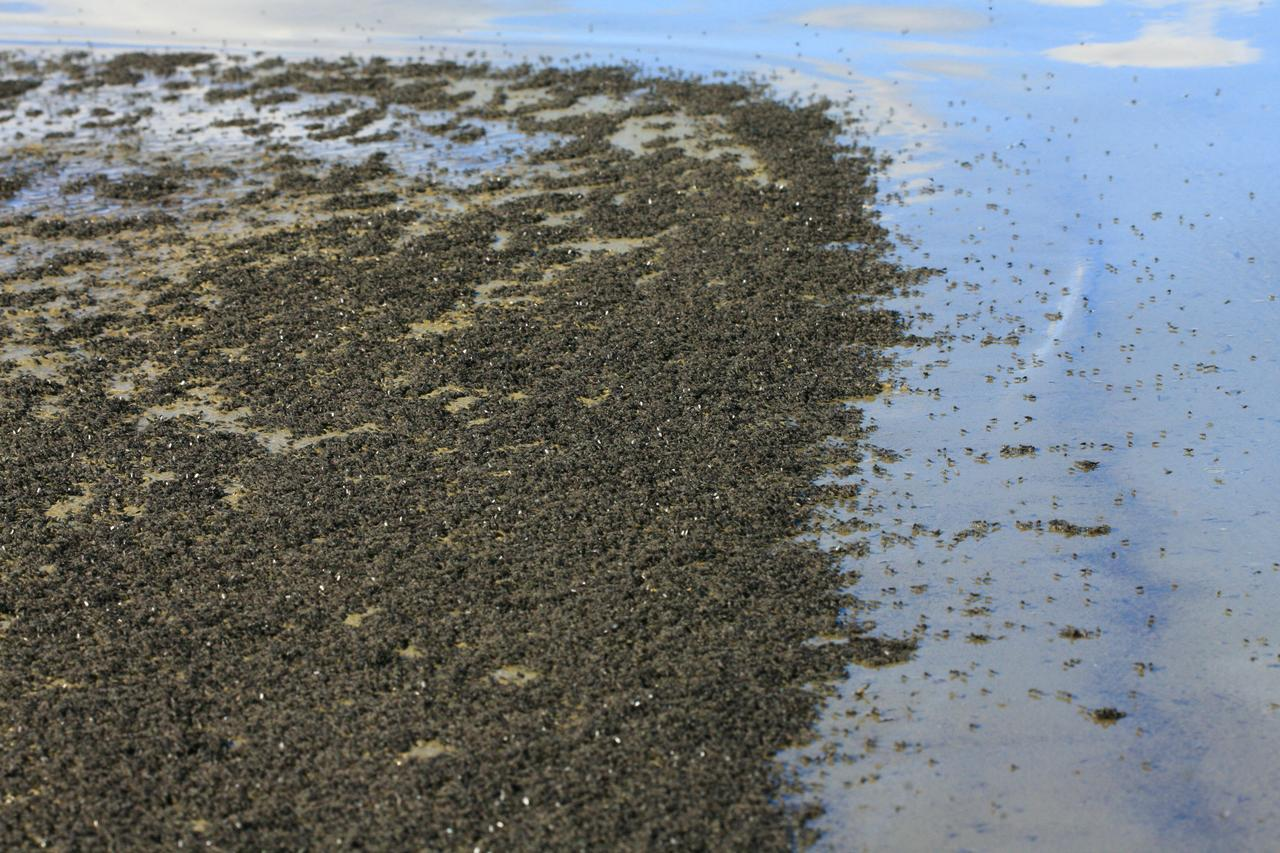
Vast numbers of Ephydra hians at Mono Lake

This species is found mostly in the northwestern United States, as well as in Canada and Mexico. The preferred habitat is in the benthic-littoral zone, in habitats containing large amounts of tufa (a porous limestone deposit). Mono Lake in California has a large population of this species.

== Behavior and ecology ==
Throughout the summertime, the flies, which live for 3 to 5 days, feed and lay eggs under the surface of the water. Upon hatching, the larvae roam underwater, feeding on algae and bacteria. They remain under the water until they develop into adults, acquiring oxygen supplied by photosynthesis of the algae.

Once in the adult stage, the flies are able to walk upon and beneath the water, feeding on algae. They are able to submerge themselves to depths of up to 24 feet (7.3 m) thanks to short, waxy hairs on their body, which trap a bubble of air around their bodies. This bubble is not consumed by the fly as it clambers down submerged rocks, rather its surface area is used to transpire gasses with the lakewater. In this way, the diving flies can remain submerged for up to 15 minutes in their search for algae or secluded areas for egg-laying. The hypersaline water of their habitat is especially wet, requiring the fly to have extra hair and special waxes to maintain this air bubble. When diving, a force equivalent to roughly 18 times the body weight of the fly is required to break through the surface tension of the water.

Ephydra hians are susceptible to changes in temperature. When the temperature gets colder, their life span prolongs and the individual stages of development take longer. Adult flies do not lay eggs in the winter months due to the inability to undergo adequate development, thus creating a pause in reproduction. These flies also don't surpass a depth of roughly 15 meters due to the frigid temperatures. The favorable temperatures in spring and autumn are most suitable for growth.

You can hold them under water as long as you please--they do not mind it--they are only proud of it. When you let them go, they pop up to the surface as dry as a patent office report, and walk off as unconcernedly as if they had been educated especially with a view to affording instructive entertainment to man in that particular way.

— Mark Twain, Roughing It 1872

== As food for humans ==
The Kucadikadi, a band of Northern Paiute people, historically used the pupae of this fly as a source of protein and fat. The name "Kucadikadi" means "eaters of the brine fly pupae". Year-round, but particularly in the summer, approximately 200 Kucadikadi harvested the pupae at Mono Lake. The pupae can be used to make stew after being dried. Considered a delicacy, the Kucadikadi also traded the pupae with others in the region.
