= Forcipomyia pictoni =

Scientific classification
- Domain: Eukaryota
- Kingdom: Animalia
- Phylum: Arthropoda
- Class: Insecta
- Order: Diptera
- Family: Ceratopogonidae
- Genus: Forcipomyia
- Species: F. pictoni

Binomial name
- Forcipomyia pictoni Macfie, 1938

Species of fly

Forcipomyia pictoni is a species of biting midges (flies in the family Ceratopogonidae).
