= Forcipomyia genualis =

Scientific classification
- Domain: Eukaryota
- Kingdom: Animalia
- Phylum: Arthropoda
- Class: Insecta
- Order: Diptera
- Family: Ceratopogonidae
- Genus: Forcipomyia
- Species: F. genualis

Binomial name
- Forcipomyia genualis (Loew, 1866)

Synonyms
- Ceratopogon genualis Loew, 1866; Forcipomyia raleighi Macfie, 1938

Species of fly

Forcipomyia genualis is a species of biting midges (flies in the family Ceratopogonidae).
