= Forcipomyia fairfaxensis =

Scientific classification
- Domain: Eukaryota
- Kingdom: Animalia
- Phylum: Arthropoda
- Class: Insecta
- Order: Diptera
- Family: Ceratopogonidae
- Genus: Forcipomyia
- Species: F. fairfaxensis

Binomial name
- Forcipomyia fairfaxensis Wirth, 1951

Species of fly

Forcipomyia fairfaxensis is a species of biting midges (flies in the family Ceratopogonidae).
