= Forcipomyia brevipennis =

Scientific classification
- Kingdom: Animalia
- Phylum: Arthropoda
- Class: Insecta
- Order: Diptera
- Family: Ceratopogonidae
- Genus: Forcipomyia
- Species: F. brevipennis

Binomial name
- Forcipomyia brevipennis (Macquart, 1826)

Synonyms
- Ceratopogon brevipenne Macquart, 1826; Ceratopogon specularis Coquillett, 1901

Species of fly

Forcipomyia brevipennis is a species of fly in the family Ceratopogonidae ("biting midges"), in the order Diptera ("flies"). It is found in Europe and North America.
