= Forcipomyia glauca =

Scientific classification
- Domain: Eukaryota
- Kingdom: Animalia
- Phylum: Arthropoda
- Class: Insecta
- Order: Diptera
- Family: Ceratopogonidae
- Genus: Forcipomyia
- Species: F. glauca

Binomial name
- Forcipomyia glauca Macfie, 1934

Synonyms
- Forcipomyia splendida Wirth, 1951

Species of fly

Forcipomyia glauca is a species of biting midges (flies in the family Ceratopogonidae).
