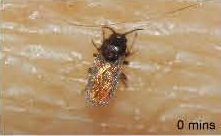
- Forcipomyia taiwana

Scientific classification
- Kingdom: Animalia
- Phylum: Arthropoda
- Clade: Pancrustacea
- Class: Insecta
- Order: Diptera
- Family: Ceratopogonidae
- Genus: Forcipomyia
- Species: F. taiwana

Binomial name
- Forcipomyia taiwana (Tokuichi Shiraki, 1913)

= Forcipomyia taiwana =

Species of biting midge

Forcipomyia taiwana, commonly known as the little black mosquito, is a species of biting midge of the genus Forcipomyia, found in Taiwan and China. It mainly sucks human blood, particularly from extremities such as ankles, lower legs, and elbows. Its bite causes the surrounding skin to become red, swollen, and extremely itchy, and can also precipitate more extreme allergic reactions.

== Description ==
Adult Forcipomyia taiwana are approximately 1.4 mm in length. It has a black head and dark brown antennae, mouthparts, chest, and abdomen. Female F. taiwana have short, sparse hairs on their antennae.

The head of the first instar larvae is dark brown, while the body is light yellow and slightly transparent. The head of the mature larvae is dark brown, and the body is yellowish brown. The body length of a mature larva is about 2.7 mm. Larvae have hairs on the back of their chest and legs. The last two segments of the body each have a pair of horns-shaped protrusions with the tips facing backward. The pupa of F. taiwana is about 2 mm long. The newly formed pupa is light brown and turns dark brown as the adult insect nears emergence.

== Distribution ==
Forcipomyia taiwana was originally discovered in 1913 by Japanese entomologist Tokuichi Shiraki in Taichung County, Taiwan. Between 1990 and 1991, it was identified in 11 Taiwanese counties, except for Miaoli, Kaohsiung, Pingtung, and Taitung. By 2012, subsequent surveys had revealed its presence throughout the island.

Populations are typically found in moderately moist areas with abundant grass and bushes, such as parks, school grounds, and villages near foothills. It is mostly found at altitudes below 250m, though occurrences have been reported at up to 500m. The rarity of the species at higher altitudes means that high mountain ranges, many of which exist in Taiwan, serve as genetic barriers to F. taiwana populations, leading to considerable genetic differentiation between populations on different sides of the mountain ranges.

== Reproduction ==
F. taiwana breed year-round. Females tend to lay eggs in sunlit, humid soil in areas with high concentrations of blue-green or green algae, which serve as food for the midge's larvae. After feeding on blood, a gravid female F. taiwana lays approximately 40 eggs over 2–3 days. After hatching, larvae reach maturity in about 16 days in conditions of 26 °C and 70% relative humidity.

== Interactions with humans ==
=== Effects of bite ===
Bites from F. taiwana generally result in itchy, swollen, and red patches of skin. Because of the intense itchiness, care should be taken not to introduce infection to the area by excessive scratching. In extreme cases, bites can lead to fever and swollen lymph nodes. Symptoms generally last for several days, though in severe cases, may last for more than 10 days.

Though some F. taiwana specimens were found to harbor Japanese encephalitis, there is thus far no recorded occurrence of F. taiwana transmitting disease to humans.

Cold compresses or antipruritic creams may temporarily relieve itching or pain from F. taiwana bites.

=== Prevention and population control ===
In order to prevent F. taiwana bites, those spending time outdoors in affected regions are advised to wear long sleeve shirts or pants, or apply mosquito repellent. Homes and businesses in regions with high populations of F. taiwana may install screens with a mesh size of 55 or larger to prevent the midges from entering indoors.

To prevent the proliferation of F. taiwana populations, residents in affected areas are advised to eliminate algae growth in their living spaces, thereby removing a key food source for F. taiwana larvae.

Though chemical pesticides may be used to control F. taiwana populations, it is not advised in most situations due to the deleterious effects on the surrounding environment and the potential for breeding pesticide-resistant populations.
