= Forcipomyia bystraki =

Scientific classification
- Kingdom: Animalia
- Phylum: Arthropoda
- Class: Insecta
- Order: Diptera
- Family: Ceratopogonidae
- Genus: Forcipomyia
- Species: F. bystraki

Binomial name
- Forcipomyia bystraki Grogan & Wirth, 1975

Species of fly

Forcipomyia bystraki is a species of biting midges (flies in the Ceratopogonidae family) from North America.
