= Apisomyla =

Scientific classification
- Kingdom: Animalia
- Phylum: Arthropoda
- Class: Insecta
- Order: Diptera
- Family: Stratiomyidae
- Subfamily: Hermetiinae
- Genus: Apisomyla; Woodley & Lessard, 2019
- Species: A. bathae

Binomial name
- Apisomyla bathae Woodley & Lessard, 2019

Genus of flies

Apisomyla is a genus of flies in the family Stratiomyidae. The only species in this genus is Apisomyla bathae.
