= Patagiomyia =

Scientific classification
- Kingdom: Animalia
- Phylum: Arthropoda
- Class: Insecta
- Order: Diptera
- Family: Stratiomyidae
- Subfamily: Hermetiinae
- Genus: Patagiomyia; Lindner, 1933

Type species
- Patagiomyia cyphomyioides Lindner, 1933

Genus of flies

Patagiomyia is a genus of flies in the family Stratiomyidae.

== Species ==
- Patagiomyia cyphomyioides Lindner, 1933

== Distribution ==
Colombia, Peru, Ecuador, Bolivia.
