= Forcipomyia bipunctata =

Scientific classification
- Kingdom: Animalia
- Phylum: Arthropoda
- Class: Insecta
- Order: Diptera
- Family: Ceratopogonidae
- Genus: Forcipomyia
- Species: F. bipunctata

Binomial name
- Forcipomyia bipunctata (Linnaeus, 1767)

Synonyms
- Tipula bipunctata Linnaeus, 1767

Species of fly

Forcipomyia bipunctata is a species of biting midges (flies in the family Ceratopogonidae) from Europe and North America.
