= Notohermetia =

Scientific classification
- Kingdom: Animalia
- Phylum: Arthropoda
- Class: Insecta
- Order: Diptera
- Family: Stratiomyidae
- Subfamily: Hermetiinae
- Genus: Notohermetia; James, 1950

Type species
- Notohermetia pilifrons James, 1950

Genus of flies

Notohermetia is a genus of flies in the family Stratiomyidae.

== Species ==
- Notohermetia pilifrons James, 1950

== Distribution ==
Vanuatu.
