= Forcipomyiinae =

Scientific classification
- Kingdom: Animalia
- Phylum: Arthropoda
- Clade: Pancrustacea
- Class: Insecta
- Order: Diptera
- Family: Ceratopogonidae
- Subfamily: Forcipomyiinae; Lenz, 1934

Forcipomyiinae is the second most species-rich subfamily of biting midges and can be found on all continents except Antarctica.

== Systematics ==
The following 2 tribes, 2 genera and 36 subgenera are included as of 2020 (subgenera are shifted to the right):

==== Tribe: Dasyheleini ====
- Dasyhelea Kieffer, 1911

==== Tribe: Forcipomyiini ====
- Atrichopogon Kieffer, 1906
- Forcipomyia Meigen, 1818
  - Atopomyia Yu & Liu, 2000
  - Baliohelea Yu & Liu, 2006
  - Bassoforcipomyia Debenham, 1987
  - Blantonia Wirth & Dow, 1971
  - Caloforcipomyia Saunders, 1957
  - Colessohelea Debenham, 1987
  - Dycea Debenham, 1987
  - Euprojoannisia Brèthes, 1914
  - Forcipohelea Clastrier & Delécolle, 1991
  - Forcipomyia Meigen
  - Gampsohelea Yu & Liu, 2005
  - Herakleohelea Debenham, 1987
  - Ixodehelea Yu & Liu, 2005
  - Japygahelea Yu & Liu, 2005
  - Kattangomyia Debenham, 1987
  - Lasiohelea Kieffer, 1921
  - Lepidohelea Kieffer, 1917
  - Metaforcipomyia Saunders, 1957
  - Microhelea Kieffer, 1917
  - Nicothohelea Liu, Tang & Hao, 2002
  - Oreinohelea Yu & Liu, 2005
  - Panhelea Remm, 1980
  - Pedilohelea de Meillon & Wirth, 1980
  - Phytohelea Remm, 1971
  - Pterobosca Macfie, 1932
  - Rhinohelea de Meillon & Wirth, 1979
  - Rhynchoforcipomyia Wirth & Dow, 1972
  - Saliohelea Wirth & Ratanaworabhan, 1978
  - Schineromyia Debenham, 1987
  - Schizoforcipomyia Chan & LeRoux, 1971
  - Synthyridomyia Saunders, 1957
  - Thyridomyia Saunders, 1925
  - Trichohelea Goetghebuer, 1920
  - Trithicomyia Yu & Song, 2008
  - Typhonomyia Debenham, 1987
  - Warmkea Saunders, 1957
