= John William Scott Macfie =

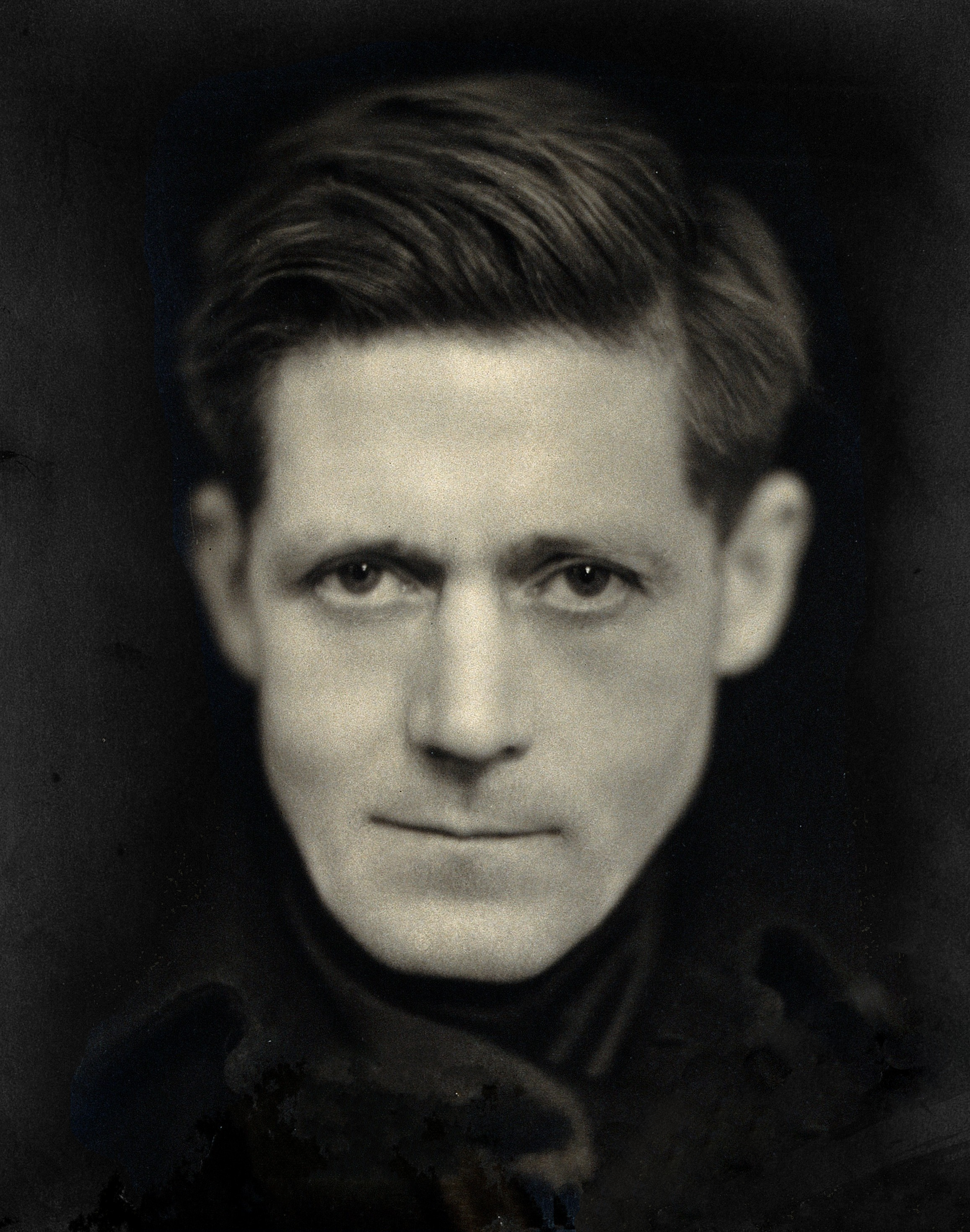
- Born: 16 September 1879; Eastham, Cheshire
- Died: 11 October 1948 (aged 69); Buchanan Hospital, St Leonards-on-Sea, Sussex
- Education: Gonville and Caius College, Cambridge
- Known for: Researches on tropical diseases, especially on malaria and trypanosomiasis Contributions to entomology, particularly descriptive reports of new species, on ceratopogonidae (biting midges), mosquitoes and tse-tse fly
- Awards: Mary Kingsley Medal
- Scientific career
- Fields: zoology / medicine
- Workplaces: University of Edinburgh; Radcliffe Infirmary and County Hospital, Oxford

John William Scott Macfie DSc (Edin.) (16 September 1879 – 11 October 1948) was an English entomologist, parasitologist and protozoologist.

== Life ==
Macfie was born in Eastham, Cheshire, England. He died in Hastings, Sussex, England.

Macfie was educated at Oundle School and Caius College, Cambridge. In 1915 he received a DSc from the University of Edinburgh. He was director of the Medical Research Institute in Accra between 1914 and 1923, having undertaken the same responsibilities in an acting capacity at Lagos in 1913.

He was awarded the Mary Kingsley medal by the Liverpool School of Tropical Medicine in 1919 and lectured at that institution on protozoology between 1923 and 1925.
