= Maurice Emile Marie Goetghebuer =

Belgian entomologist

- Born: Maurice Goetghebuer; 1 March 1876
- Died: 26 February 1962 (aged 85)

Maurice Emile Marie Goetghebuer (1 March 1876–26 February 1962) was a Belgian entomologist. He concentrated on Diptera, especially the Chironomidae.

== See also ==
Photo of Goetghebuer
