= Willis Wagner Wirth =

American entomologist

Willis Wagner Wirth (1916–1994) was an American entomologist. He was born in Dunbar, Nebraska.
