= Forcipomyia =

- A Forcipomyia sp. sucks hemolymph from Nemophora metallica

Scientific classification
- Kingdom: Animalia
- Phylum: Arthropoda
- Clade: Pancrustacea
- Class: Insecta
- Order: Diptera
- Family: Ceratopogonidae
- Subfamily: Forcipomyiinae
- Genus: Forcipomyia; Meigen, 1818

Subgenera
- See text

Genus of flies

Forcipomyia is a genus of biting midges in the subfamily Forcipomyiinae. Species of the subgenus Lasiohelea suck vertebrate blood. Some species are ectoparasites on larger insects. Other species in the genus are important pollinators of the cacao tree (Theobroma cacao). There are at least 1,000 described species in the genus Forcipomyia.

It is often repeated that a species of Forcipomyia has the highest recorded wing-beat frequency at 1046 Hz, citing a paper by Finnish entomologist Olavi Sotavalta published in 1953. The actual wing-beat frequency given for an unmanipulated individual in Sotavalta's 1953 paper is 800–950 Hz, and the figure of 1046 Hz instead appears in Sotavalta's 1947 PhD thesis. Sotavalta was able to induce a wing-beat frequency as high as 2218 Hz by clipping the midge's wings close to the base and heating it to 37° C, shortly after which the midge died.

== Subgenera ==
- Forcipomyia (Baliohelea) Yu & Liu, 2005
- Forcipomyia (Bassoforcipomyia) Debenham, 1987
- Forcipomyia (Blantonia) Wirth & Dow, 1971
- Forcipomyia (Caloforcipomyia) Saunders, 1957
- Forcipomyia (Collessohelea) Debenham, 1987
- Forcipomyia (Dycea) Debenham, 1987
- Forcipomyia (Euprojoannisia) Saunders, 1957
- Forcipomyia (Forcipohelea)
- Forcipomyia (Forcipomyia)
- Forcipomyia (Gampsohelea) Yu & Liu, 2005
- Forcipomyia (Herakleohelea) Debenham, 1987
- Forcipomyia (Ixodehelea) Yu & Liu, 2005
- Forcipomyia (Japygahelea) Yu & Liu, 2005
- Forcipomyia (Kattangomyia) Debenham, 1987
- Forcipomyia (Lasiohelea)
- Forcipomyia (Lepidohelea)
- Forcipomyia (Microhelea)
- Forcipomyia (Nicothohelea)
- Forcipomyia (Oreinohelea) Yu & Liu, 2005
- Forcipomyia (Panhelea)
- Forcipomyia (Pedilohelea)
- Forcipomyia (Phytohelea)
- Forcipomyia (Pterobosca)
- Forcipomyia (Rhinohelea)
- Forcipomyia (Rhynchoforcipomyia)
- Forcipomyia (Schineromyia) Debenham, 1987
- Forcipomyia (Schizoforcipomyia)
- Forcipomyia (Synthyridomyia) Saunders, 1957
- Forcipomyia (Thyridomyia)
- Forcipomyia (Trichohelea)
- Forcipomyia (Trithicomyia)
- Forcipomyia (Typhonomyia) Debenham, 1987
- Forcipomyia (Warmkea) Saunders, 1957

== See also ==
- List of Forcipomyia species
