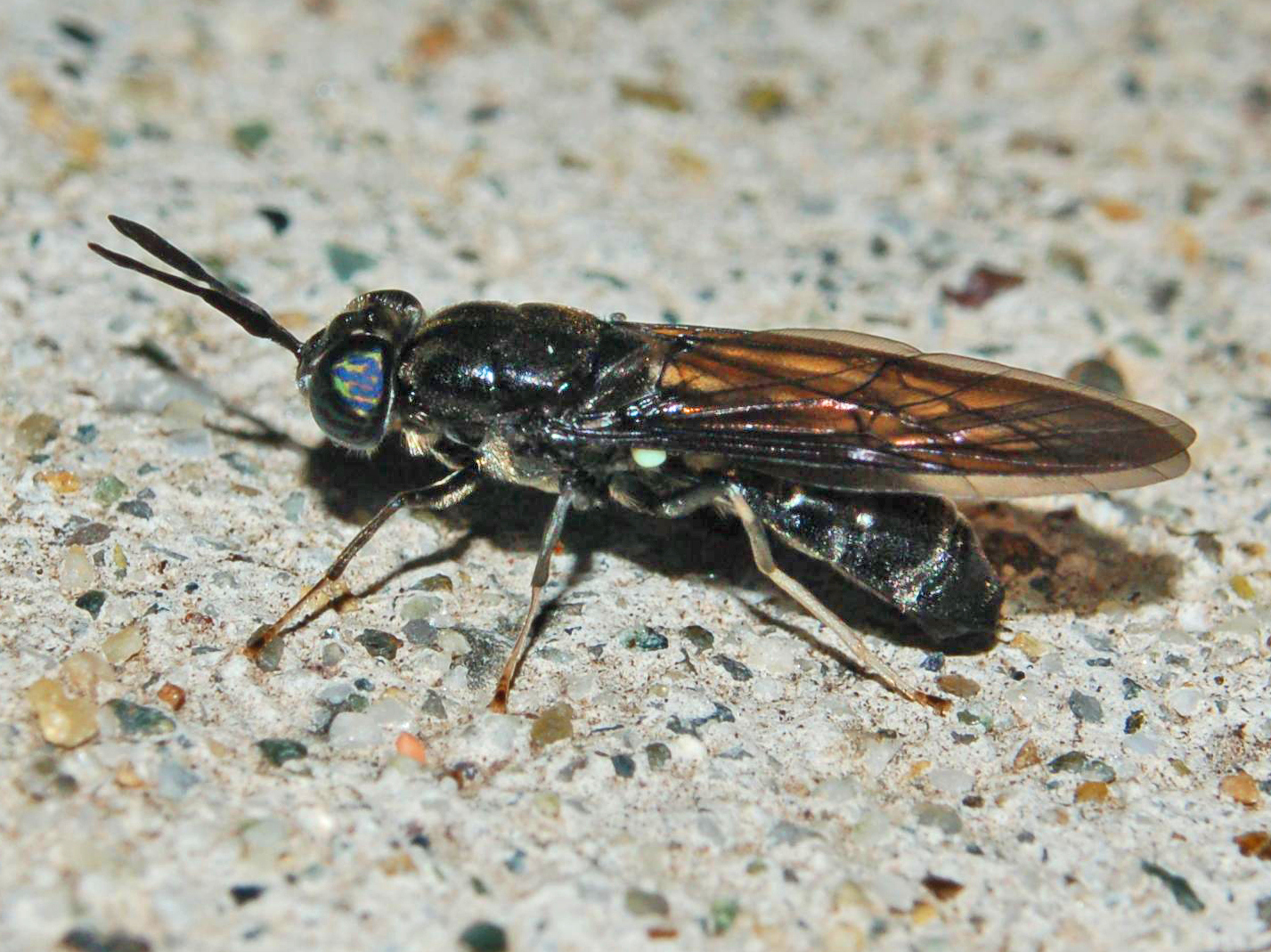
- Hermetia illucens

Scientific classification
- Kingdom: Animalia
- Phylum: Arthropoda
- Clade: Pancrustacea
- Class: Insecta
- Order: Diptera
- Family: Stratiomyidae
- Subfamily: Hermetiinae; Loew, 1862

Genera
- 6, see text.

= Hermetiinae =

Subfamily of flies

Hermetiinae is a subfamily of flies in the family Stratiomyidae.

== Genera ==
There are currently 6 described genera in Hermetiinae:

- Apisomyla Woodley & Lessard, 2019
- Chaetohermetia Lindner, 1929
- Chaetosargus Röder, 1894
- Hermetia Latreille, 1804
- Notohermetia James, 1950
- Patagiomyia Lindner, 1933
