= List of Bezzia species =

This is a list of 306 species in Bezzia, a genus of biting midges in the family Ceratopogonidae.

== Bezzia species ==
- Bezzia acanthodes Macfie, 1940^{c g}
- Bezzia acuta Remm, 1974^{c g}
- Bezzia adamsi Tokunaga & Murachi, 1959^{c g}
- Bezzia aegytia Kieffer, 1924^{c g}
- Bezzia affinis (Staeger, 1839)^{c g}
- Bezzia africana Ingram & Macfie, 1923^{c g}
- Bezzia aitkeni Spinelli, 1991^{c g}
- Bezzia aklavikensis Wirth and Grogan, 1983^{i c g}
- Bezzia albicornis (Meigen, 1818)^{c g}
- Bezzia albidorsata Malloch, 1915^{i c g}
- Bezzia albipes (Winnertz, 1852)^{c g}
- Bezzia albuquerquei Lane, 1961^{c g}
- Bezzia aldanica Remm, 1974^{c g}
- Bezzia algeriana Clastrier, 1962^{c g}
- Bezzia amana Meillon & Wirth, 1981^{c g}
- Bezzia ammossovi Remm, 1974^{c g}
- Bezzia analis Kieffer, 1913^{c g}
- Bezzia andersonorum Wirth and Grogan, 1983^{i c g}
- Bezzia angulata Remm, 1974^{c g}
- Bezzia annulipes (Meigen, 1838)^{i c}
- Bezzia apicata Malloch, 1914^{i c g}
- Bezzia araucana Spinelli & Wirth, 1990^{c g}
- Bezzia armatipes Kieffer, 1910^{c g}
- Bezzia assimilis Johannsen, 1931^{c g}
- Bezzia atacina Clastrier, 1962^{c g}
- Bezzia atrifemorata Clastrier, 1962^{c g}
- Bezzia atripluma Kieffer, 1919^{c g}
- Bezzia atrovittata Remm, 1972^{c g}
- Bezzia australiensis Kieffer, 1917^{c g}
- Bezzia badiifemorata Tokunaga & Murachi, 1959^{c g}
- Bezzia bargaensis Remm, 1974^{c g}
- Bezzia bengalensis Kieffer, 1913^{c g}
- Bezzia biannulata Wirth, 1952^{i c g}
- Bezzia bicolor (Meigen, 1904)^{i c g}
- Bezzia bilineata Wirth, 1952^{i c g}
- Bezzia bivittata (Coquillett, 1905)^{i c g}
- Bezzia blandiata Remm, 1967^{c g}
- Bezzia blantoni Spinelli & Wirth, 1989^{c g}
- Bezzia bohemica Kieffer, 1919^{c g}
- Bezzia boiemica Kieffer, 1922^{c g}
- Bezzia bresi Huttel & Huttel, 1951^{c g}
- Bezzia brevicornis (Kieffer, 1917)^{c g}
- Bezzia brevipluma Kieffer, 1919^{c g}
- Bezzia bromeliae Spinelli, 1991^{c g}
- Bezzia calceata (Walker, 1856)^{c g}
- Bezzia calcuttensis Kieffer, 1913^{c g}
- Bezzia campanai Clastrier, 1962^{c g}
- Bezzia capitata Wirth and Grogan, 1983^{i c g}
- Bezzia carioca (Lane, 1958)^{c}
- Bezzia catarinensis Spinelli & Wirth, 1990^{c g}
- Bezzia cayoensis Spinelli, 1991^{c g}
- Bezzia chelistyla Wirth and Grogan, 1983^{i c g}
- Bezzia chilensis Spinelli & Ronderos, 2001^{c g}
- Bezzia chrysolopha Kieffer, 1912^{c g}
- Bezzia circumdata (Staeger, 1839)^{c g}
- Bezzia clarkei Tokunaga & Murachi, 1959^{c g}
- Bezzia clavipennis Spinelli & Wirth, 1989^{c g}
- Bezzia cockerelli Malloch, 1915^{i c g}
- Bezzia collessi Wirth & Ratanaworabhan, 1981^{c g}
- Bezzia coloradensis Wirth, 1952^{i}
- Bezzia concoloripes Macfie, 1940^{c g}
- Bezzia congolensis (Vattier & Adam, 1966)^{c g}
- Bezzia conjunctivena Tokunaga, 1966^{c g}
- Bezzia conspersa Johannsen, 1931^{c g}
- Bezzia corvina Remm, 1974^{c g}
- Bezzia curtiforceps Goetghebuer, 1929^{c g}
- Bezzia cyrtonotum Remm, 1974^{c g}
- Bezzia decincta Edwards, 1932^{g}
- Bezzia demeilloni (Haeselbarth, 1975)^{c g}
- Bezzia dentata Malloch, 1914^{i c g}
- Bezzia dentifemur Spinelli, 1991^{c g}
- Bezzia dessarti Haeselbarth, 1980^{c g}
- Bezzia dewulfi (Goetghebuer, 1935)^{c}
- Bezzia diagramma Kieffer, 1925^{c g}
- Bezzia digramma Kieffer, 1925^{g}
- Bezzia diversipes (Clastrier, 1958)^{c g}
- Bezzia dividua Tokunaga, 1966^{c g}
- Bezzia dorsasetula Dow and Turner, 1976^{i c g}
- Bezzia downesi Dow and Turner, 1976^{i c g}
- Bezzia echinata Clastrier, 1985^{c g}
- Bezzia edwardsi (Meillon, 1938)^{c g}
- Bezzia elongata Zilahi-Sebess, 1940^{c g}
- Bezzia eucera Kieffer, 1911^{c g}
- Bezzia excavata Tokunaga, 1966^{c g}
- Bezzia excisa Clastrier, 1962^{c g}
- Bezzia exclamationis Kieffer, 1918^{c g}
- Bezzia exigua Goetghebuer, 1935^{c g}
- Bezzia expedita Sinha, Mazumdar, Das Gupta & Chaudhuri, 2003^{c g}
- Bezzia expolita (Coquillett, 1901)^{i c g}
- Bezzia facialis Kieffer, 1910^{c g}
- Bezzia fairchildi Wirth, 1983^{i c g}
- Bezzia fascispinosa Clastrier, 1962^{i c g}
- Bezzia fenestrata Clastrier, 1962^{c g}
- Bezzia filiductus Spinelli, 1991^{c g}
- Bezzia flava Tokunaga, 1939^{c g}
- Bezzia flavescens Kieffer, 1913^{c g}
- Bezzia flavicornis (Staeger, 1839)^{c g}
- Bezzia flavicorporis (Meillon, 1939)^{c g}
- Bezzia flavipennis Tokunaga, 1939^{c g}
- Bezzia flavitarsis Malloch, 1914^{i c g}
- Bezzia flavitibia Dow and Turner, 1976^{i c g}
- Bezzia flavoscutellaris (Haeselbarth, 1975)^{c g}
- Bezzia flinti Spinelli, 1991^{c g}
- Bezzia fluminensis Lane, 1948^{c g}
- Bezzia fontanus Liu, Ge & Liu, 1996^{c g}
- Bezzia fortigenitalis Sinha, Mazumdar, Das Gupta & Chaudhuri, 2003^{c g}
- Bezzia foyi (Ingram & Macfie, 1921)^{c}
- Bezzia fuliginata Clastrier, 1962^{c g}
- Bezzia fusca Spinelli, 1991^{c g}
- Bezzia fuscifemoris Remm, 1971^{c g}
- Bezzia gandavensis Goetghebuer, 1935^{c g}
- Bezzia gibbera (Coquillett, 1905)^{i c g}
- Bezzia gibberella Wirth and Grogan, 1983^{i c g}
- Bezzia glabra (Coquillett, 1902)^{i c g}
- Bezzia glaucivena Sinha, Mazumdar, Das Gupta & Chaudhuri, 2003^{c g}
- Bezzia globulosa Spinelli & Wirth, 1990^{c g}
- Bezzia goianensis Lane, 1961^{c g}
- Bezzia gracilipes (Winnertz, 1852)^{c g}
- Bezzia gressitti Tokunaga, 1966^{c g}
- Bezzia griseata Remm, 1972^{c g}
- Bezzia griseipes (Clastrier, Rioux & Descous, 1961)^{c g}
- Bezzia grogani Spinelli & Wirth, 1990^{c g}
- Bezzia hainana Liu, Ge & Liu, 1996^{c g}
- Bezzia haroldi Meillon & Wirth, 1987^{c g}
- Bezzia hihifoi Clastrier & Delecolle, 1996^{c g}
- Bezzia hissarica Remm, 1974^{c g}
- Bezzia hoggarensis Clastrier, 1962^{c g}
- Bezzia hondurensis Spinelli & Wirth, 1990^{c g}
- Bezzia imbifida Dow and Turner, 1976^{i c g}
- Bezzia indecora Kieffer, 1912^{c g}
- Bezzia inflatifemora Tokunaga, 1966^{c g}
- Bezzia insolita Meillon & Wirth, 1983^{c g}
- Bezzia insularis Kieffer, 1921^{c g}
- Bezzia jamaicensis Spinelli, 1991^{c g}
- Bezzia japonica Tokunaga, 1939^{i c g}
- Bezzia javana (Kieffer, 1924)^{c g}
- Bezzia jubata Spinelli & Wirth, 1990^{c g}
- Bezzia kazlauskasi Remm, 1966^{c g}
- Bezzia kempi Kieffer, 1913^{c g}
- Bezzia kiefferiana Goetghebuer, 1934^{c g}
- Bezzia kitaokai Tokunaga, 1963^{c g}
- Bezzia kuhbetiensis Remm, 1967^{c g}
- Bezzia kuhetiensis Remm, 1967^{g}
- Bezzia kurensis Remm, 1967^{c g}
- Bezzia laciniastyla Dow and Turner, 1976^{i c g}
- Bezzia latipalpis Clastrier, 1962^{c g}
- Bezzia leei Spinelli & Wirth, 1990^{c g}
- Bezzia lenkoi Lane, 1958^{c g}
- Bezzia leucogaster (Zetterstedt, 1850)^{c g}
- Bezzia lewvanichae Wirth & Ratanaworabhan, 1981^{c g}
- Bezzia lineola Kieffer, 1910^{c g}
- Bezzia longiforceps Tokunaga, 1959^{c g}
- Bezzia longisaeta (Spataru, 1973)^{g}
- Bezzia lophophora Clastrier, 1988^{c g}
- Bezzia lucida (Meillon, 1939)^{c g}
- Bezzia lutea Wirth & Ratanaworabhan, 1981^{c g}
- Bezzia luteiventris Wirth and Grogan, 1983^{i c g}
- Bezzia maai Tokunaga, 1966^{c g}
- Bezzia maculifemorata Tokunaga & Murachi, 1959^{c g}
- Bezzia magnisetula Dow and Turner, 1976^{i c g}
- Bezzia mallochi Wirth, 1951^{i c g}
- Bezzia mathisi Spinelli, 1991^{c g}
- Bezzia mazaruni Macfie, 1940^{c g}
- Bezzia media (Coquillett, 1904)^{i c g}
- Bezzia medusa Nie, Li, Li & & Yu, 2005^{c g}
- Bezzia megatheca Spinelli & Wirth, 1990^{c g}
- Bezzia melanesiae Clastrier, 1985^{c g}
- Bezzia melanoflava (Clastrier, 1958)^{c g}
- Bezzia melanoflavida (Clastrier & Wirth, 1961)^{c g}
- Bezzia mellori Boorman & Harten, 2002^{c g}
- Bezzia mesotibialis Spinelli & Wirth, 1990^{c g}
- Bezzia mexicana Spinelli, 1991^{c g}
- Bezzia meyensis (Vattier & Adam, 1966)^{c g}
- Bezzia micronyx Kieffer, 1921^{c g}
- Bezzia minuta Remm, 1974^{c g}
- Bezzia minutistyla Tokunaga, 1939^{c g}
- Bezzia mohave Wirth and Grogan, 1983^{i c g}
- Bezzia mollis Johannsen, 1931^{c g}
- Bezzia monacantha Kieffer, 1925^{c g}
- Bezzia mongolica Remm, 1972^{c g}
- Bezzia monotheca Sinha, Mazumdar, Das Gupta & Chaudhuri, 2003^{c g}
- Bezzia morvani Clastrier, 1962^{c g}
- Bezzia multiannulata (Strobl, 1906)^{c g}
- Bezzia multispinosa Clastrier, 1962^{c g}
- Bezzia murina Kieffer, 1921^{c g}
- Bezzia murphyi (Clastrier & Wirth, 1961)^{c g}
- Bezzia narynica Remm, 1973^{c g}
- Bezzia naseri Boorman & Harten, 2002^{c g}
- Bezzia nicator (Meillon, 1959)^{c g}
- Bezzia nigerrima (Haeselbarth, 1965)^{c g}
- Bezzia nigrialula Tokunaga, 1959^{c g}
- Bezzia nigriclava Kieffer, 1921^{c g}
- Bezzia nigripes Wirth and Grogan, 1983^{i c g}
- Bezzia nigrita Clastrier, 1962^{c g}
- Bezzia nigritibialis Spinelli, 1991^{c g}
- Bezzia nigritula (Zetterstedt, 1838)^{c g}
- Bezzia nigrofasciata Tokunaga, 1959^{c g}
- Bezzia nigroflava Remm, 1974^{c g}
- Bezzia niokoloensis (Clastrier, 1958)^{c g}
- Bezzia niphatoda Yu, 2000^{c g}
- Bezzia nobilis (Winnertz, 1852)^{i c g b}
- Bezzia nodosipes (Kieffer, 1924)^{c g}
- Bezzia numidiana Clastrier, 1962^{c g}
- Bezzia nyasae (Macfie, 1932)^{c}
- Bezzia obelisca Dow and Turner, 1976^{i c g}
- Bezzia omanensis Boorman & Harten, 2002^{c g}
- Bezzia opaca ^{i g}
- Bezzia ornata (Meigen, 1830)^{c g}
- Bezzia ornatissima (Kieffer, 1911)^{c g}
- Bezzia pachypyga Remm, 1974^{c g}
- Bezzia pallidipes Clastrier & Wirth, 1961^{c g}
- Bezzia palustris Clastrier, 1962^{c g}
- Bezzia papillistyla Sinha, Mazumdar, Das Gupta & Chaudhuri, 2003^{c g}
- Bezzia papuae Tokunaga, 1966^{c g}
- Bezzia pediaureola Tokunaga & Murachi, 1959^{c g}
- Bezzia perplexa Dow and Turner, 1976^{i c g}
- Bezzia pictipes Goetghebuer, 1948^{c g}
- Bezzia pilipennis Lundstrom, 1916^{c g}
- Bezzia pilosella Remm, 1974^{c g}
- Bezzia platyura (Macfie, 1947)^{c g}
- Bezzia propriostyla Sinha, Mazumdar, Das Gupta & Chaudhuri, 2003^{c g}
- Bezzia prospicula Remm, 1974^{c g}
- Bezzia pruinosa (Coquillett, 1905)^{i c g}
- Bezzia pseudobscura Wirth, 1951^{i c g}
- Bezzia pseudogibbera Spinelli & Wirth, 1990^{c g}
- Bezzia pseudovenstula Spinelli, 1991^{c g}
- Bezzia pulchripes Kieffer, 1917^{c g}
- Bezzia pulverea (Coquillett, 1901)^{i c g}
- Bezzia punctipennis (Williston, 1896)^{i c g}
- Bezzia pygmaea Goetghebuer, 1920^{c g}
- Bezzia raposoensis Spinelli, 1991^{c g}
- Bezzia rhodesiensis Haeselbarth, 1975^{c g}
- Bezzia rhynchostylata Remm, 1974^{c g}
- Bezzia riparia Clastrier, 1985^{c g}
- Bezzia roldani Spinelli & Wirth, 1981^{c g}
- Bezzia rossii Clastrier, 1962^{c g}
- Bezzia rubiginosa (Winnertz, 1852)^{c g}
- Bezzia rufescens Remm, 1971^{c g}
- Bezzia rufifacies Goetghebuer, 1932^{c g}
- Bezzia rufifascies Goetghebuer, 1932^{g}
- Bezzia rufipes (Kieffer, 1911)^{c g}
- Bezzia sahariensis Clastrier, 1962^{c g}
- Bezzia saileri Wirth, 1983^{i c g}
- Bezzia sajana Remm, 1972^{c g}
- Bezzia sandersoni Wirth and Grogan, 1983^{i c g}
- Bezzia schmitzorum Dippolito & Spinelli, 1995^{c g}
- Bezzia segermanae Haeselbarth, 1975^{c g}
- Bezzia separata Kieffer, 1916^{c g}
- Bezzia serena Johannsen, 1931^{c g}
- Bezzia sergenti Kieffer, 1922^{c g}
- Bezzia setigera Spinelli & Wirth, 1990^{c g}
- Bezzia setosa Remm, 1974^{c g}
- Bezzia setosinotum Wirth and Grogan, 1983^{i c g}
- Bezzia setulosa ^{i}
- Bezzia sevanica Remm, 1974^{c g}
- Bezzia sexspinosa Edwards, 1928^{c g}
- Bezzia seychelleana (Kieffer, 1911)^{c}
- Bezzia signata (Meigen, 1804)^{c g}
- Bezzia sinica Hao & Yu, 2003^{c g}
- Bezzia sivashica Remm & Zhogolev, 1968^{c g}
- Bezzia snowi Spinelli, 1991^{c g}
- Bezzia solstitialis (Winnertz, 1852)^{i}
- Bezzia sordida Wirth, 1952^{i c g}
- Bezzia spathula Wirth and Grogan, 1983^{i c g}
- Bezzia spicata Dow and Turner, 1976^{i c g}
- Bezzia spinosella Clastrier, 1983^{c g}
- Bezzia spinositibialis Tokunaga & Murachi, 1959^{c g}
- Bezzia strigula Clastrier, 1962^{c g}
- Bezzia suavis Johannsen, 1931^{c g}
- Bezzia subfusca Macfie, 1939^{c g}
- Bezzia sulfureicruris Tokunaga & Murachi, 1959^{c g}
- Bezzia tadsignata Remm, 1974^{c g}
- Bezzia taeniata (Haliday, 1856)^{c g}
- Bezzia tasmaniensis Lee, 1948^{c g}
- Bezzia tenuiforceps Clastrier, 1962^{c g}
- Bezzia ternidenta Yu, 2000^{c g}
- Bezzia texensis Wirth and Grogan, 1983^{i c g}
- Bezzia tirawati Wirth & Ratanaworabhan, 1981^{c g}
- Bezzia transfuga (Staeger, 1839)^{c g}
- Bezzia transitiva Remm, 1974^{c g}
- Bezzia trispinosa Kieffer, 1911^{c g}
- Bezzia troglophila (Vattier & Adam, 1966)^{c g}
- Bezzia tshernovskii Remm, 1993^{c g}
- Bezzia turbipes Sinha, Mazumdar, Das Gupta & Chaudhuri, 2003^{c g}
- Bezzia turkmenica Glukhova, 1979^{c g}
- Bezzia turrita Meillon & Wirth, 1983^{c g}
- Bezzia twinni Wirth, 1983^{i c g}
- Bezzia umlalazia Meillon, 1940^{c g}
- Bezzia uncistyla Dow and Turner, 1976^{i c g}
- Bezzia unispina Dow and Turner, 1976^{i c g}
- Bezzia ussurica Glukhova, 1979^{c g}
- Bezzia varia Haeselbarth, 1975^{c g}
- Bezzia varicolor (Coquillett, 1902)^{i c g b}
- Bezzia ventanensis Spinelli^{g}
- Bezzia venustula Spinelli, 1991^{c g}
- Bezzia vilbastei Remm, 1971^{c g}
- Bezzia vitilevuensis Wirth & Giles, 1990^{c g}
- Bezzia vittata Tokunaga, 1966^{c g}
- Bezzia winnertziana Kieffer, 1919^{c g}
- Bezzia wirthi Haeselbarth, 1965^{c g}
- Bezzia woodruffi Spinelli, 1991^{c g}
- Bezzia xanthocephala Goetghebuer, 1911^{c g}
- Bezzia xanthogaster Kieffer, 1919^{c}
- Bezzia yasumatsui Wirth & Ratanaworabhan, 1981^{c g}
- Bezzia zajantshkauskasi Remm, 1966^{c g}
- Bezzia zonatipes Tokunaga, 1966^{c g}

Data sources: i = ITIS, c = Catalogue of Life, g = GBIF, b = Bugguide.net
