= Phaenobezzia opaca =

Scientific classification
- Kingdom: Animalia
- Phylum: Arthropoda
- Class: Insecta
- Order: Diptera
- Family: Ceratopogonidae
- Tribe: Palpomyiini
- Genus: Phaenobezzia
- Species: P. opaca

Binomial name
- Phaenobezzia opaca (Loew, 1861)

Synonyms
- Ceratopogon opaca Loew, 1861; Probezzia incerta Malloch, 1915

Species of fly

Phaenobezzia opaca is a species of biting midge in the family Ceratopogonidae.
