= Bezzia varicolor =

Scientific classification
- Domain: Eukaryota
- Kingdom: Animalia
- Phylum: Arthropoda
- Class: Insecta
- Order: Diptera
- Family: Ceratopogonidae
- Tribe: Palpomyiini
- Genus: Bezzia
- Species: B. varicolor

Binomial name
- Bezzia varicolor (Coquillett, 1902)

Synonyms
- Ceratopogon varicolor Coquillett, 1902

Species of fly

Bezzia varicolor is a species of biting midges in the family Ceratopogonidae.
