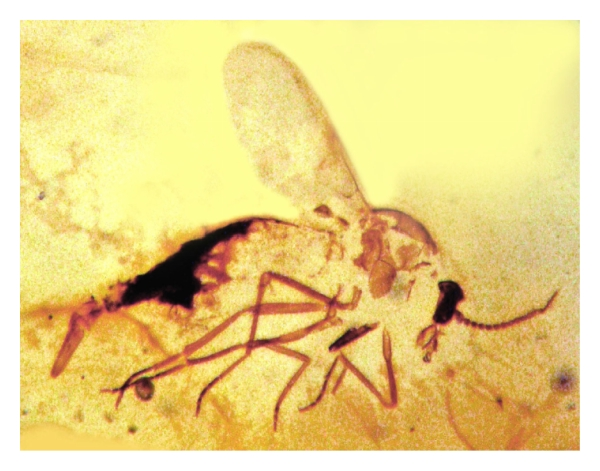
- Holotype in Burmese amber

Scientific classification
- Kingdom: Animalia
- Phylum: Arthropoda
- Clade: Pancrustacea
- Class: Insecta
- Order: Diptera
- Family: Ceratopogonidae
- Genus: Leptoconops
- Species: †L. nosopheris

Binomial name
- †Leptoconops nosopheris Poinar, 2008

= Leptoconops nosopheris =

Extinct species of fly

Leptoconops nosopheris is an extinct species of biting midges belonging to the family Ceratopogonidae. This species was described from fossilized remains preserved in Burmese amber from the Early Cretaceous. The amber containing the fossil was mined in the Hukawng Valley, in Kachin State, Myanmar

The female type specimen was entrapped in amber shortly after ingesting a meal of blood. This blood was infected with a mass of parasitic trypanosomes, Paleotrypanosoma burmanicus, which were also preserved. L. nosopheris is the first species of Leptonocops to be associated with trypanosomes.

The species name nosopheris is from the Greek words nosos, meaning disease, and phero, meaning to carry or bear.
