= Leptoconops amplificatus =

Scientific classification
- Kingdom: Animalia
- Phylum: Arthropoda
- Class: Insecta
- Order: Diptera
- Family: Ceratopogonidae
- Genus: Leptoconops
- Subgenus: †Palaeoconops
- Species: L. amplificatus

Binomial name
- Leptoconops amplificatus Borkent, 2001

Extinct species of fly

Leptoconops amplificatus is an extinct species of biting midge belonging to the family Ceratopogonidae. This species was described from fossilized remains preserved in Lower Cretaceous amber from Lebanon.

The species name amplificatus (enlarged, extended) was given in reference to the presence of 13 flagellomeres in the female antennae. L. amplificatus is the only species of Ceratopogonidae to possess this many antennal flagellomeres as well as an elongate, slender cercus. Another species of Leptoconops discovered in the same piece of amber, Leptoconops antiquus, also possesses 13 flagellomeres, but is differentiated by a basally broadened cercus.
