= Anautogeny =

Parasitic insect reproductive strategy

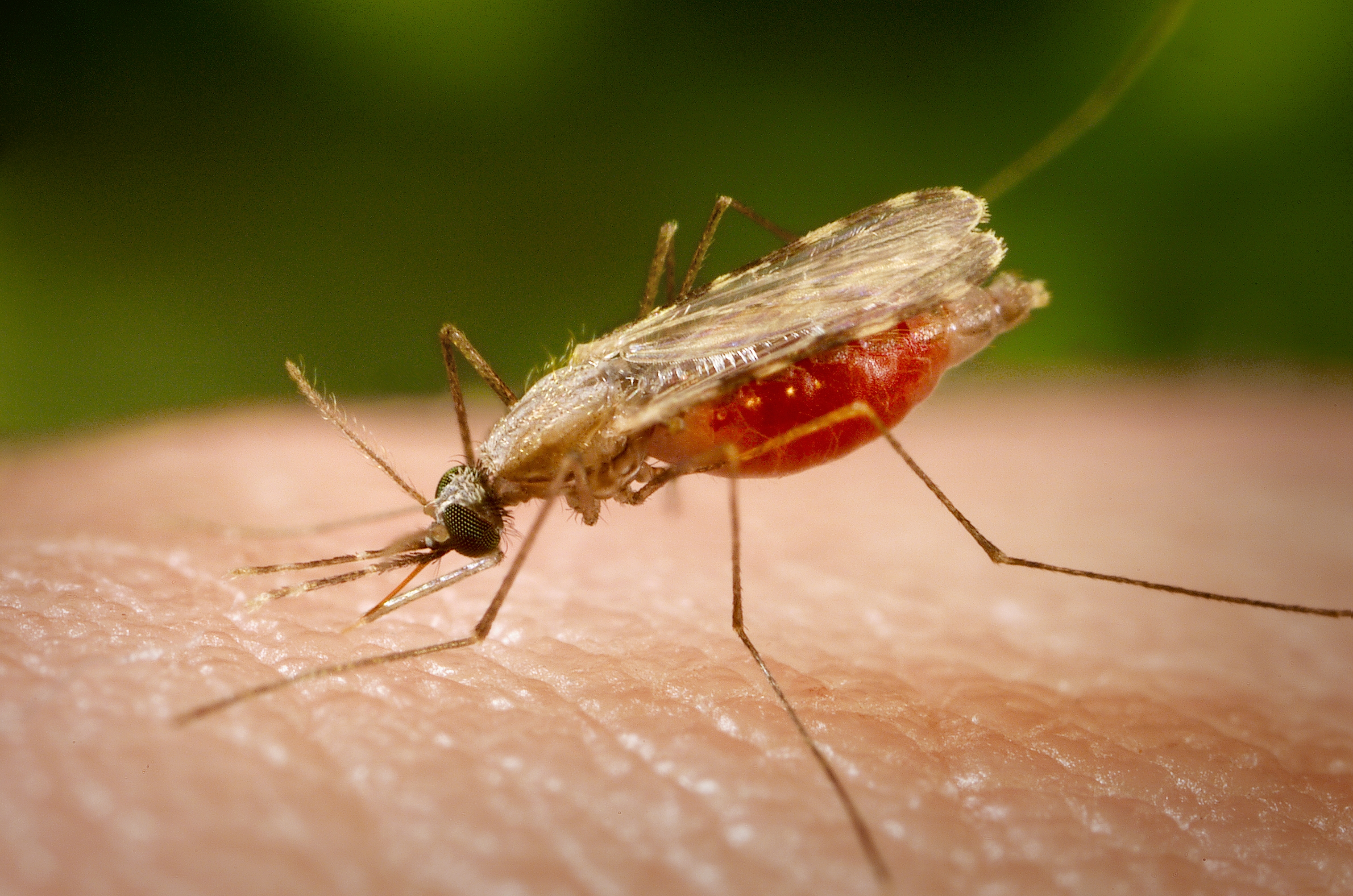
A female Anopheles minimus mosquito obtaining a blood meal from a human host to support its anautogenous reproduction

In entomology, anautogeny is a reproductive strategy in which an adult female insect must eat a particular sort of meal (generally vertebrate blood) before laying eggs in order for her eggs to mature. This behavior is most common among dipteran flies, such as mosquitoes. Anautogenous animals often serve as vectors for infectious disease in their hosts because of their contact with hosts' blood. The opposite trait (needing no special food as an adult to successfully reproduce) is known as autogeny.

== Factors governing anautogeny ==
Anautogenous insects generally reach adulthood without sufficient reserves of nutrients (particularly protein) to produce viable eggs, necessitating additional feeding as adults. A high-protein meal, usually of blood, allows the production of yolk to nourish the eggs and makes reproduction possible. This blood is typically obtained through ectoparasitism on large vertebrates.

However, even individuals who do have the reserves needed to produce viable eggs may still be unable to reproduce without a blood meal, because egg maturation in many anautogenous species depends upon hormones that are released when blood is consumed. Further, females with certain genotypes are anautogenous by default but can be triggered to reproduce autogenously by mating with a male, possibly because of hormones released or acquired during mating or possibly because of some nutritional supplement the mating provides.

Individuals of the same species can be found to exhibit autogeny or anautogeny depending on their genotypes as well as on environmental circumstances and the type and amount of nourishment they obtained in their larval stage. Mathematical models have indicated that anautogeny can be an advantageous strategy for insect reproduction under favorable conditions (particularly when hosts are easy to find, when the insects have a good chance of surviving the blood-feeding, and when anautogeny contributes to increased fecundity).

== Anatomy and physiology ==
Anautogeny and consequent blood-feeding is seen mainly among the dipteran flies, including mosquitoes, black flies, sand flies, horse flies, and biting midges. Most anautogenous dipterans possess sharp, blade-like mandibles for extracting blood, though these mouthparts are often underdeveloped in the male. Since these species get additional nourishment from other fluid foods such as nectar or fruit juices, they exhibit a "dual sense of hunger" by which they regulate their intake of sugary foods and proteinaceous foods separately.

In insects (as in other non-mammalian animals), egg maturation begins with vitellogenesis, the deposition of yolk proteins triggered by the release of juvenile hormones. In anautogenous mosquitoes, yolk production genes are strongly activated after a blood meal through a process involving the target of rapamycin signal pathway. In particular, certain amino acids found in the blood proteins seem to be necessary for the activation of the vitellogenin gene.

== Autogeny ==
The need to feed on blood before laying eggs is less remarkable in animals whose ordinary diets consist largely or entirely of blood, such as ticks; in these taxa it is autogeny, or the ability to lay eggs without a blood meal, that is more remarked upon. Many insects are able to produce eggs without ingesting proteinaceous food as adults, relying upon stores of nutrients they acquired as larvae. Most, however, can lay relatively few eggs without feeding on protein, and almost all require a high-protein meal to lay additional eggs after a first clutch.

== See also ==
- Hematophagy
- Mosquito-borne disease
- Parasitism
