= Leptoconops myanmaricus =

Leptoconops myanmaricus Temporal range: Cenomanian 99 Ma

Scientific classification
- Kingdom: Animalia
- Phylum: Arthropoda
- Class: Insecta
- Order: Diptera
- Family: Ceratopogonidae
- Genus: Leptoconops
- Species: †L. myanmaricus

Binomial name
- †Leptoconops myanmaricus Szadziewski, 2004

Extinct species of fly

Leptoconops myanmaricus is an extinct species of biting midges belonging to the family Ceratopogonidae. This species was described from fossilized remains preserved in Burmese amber from the Cenomanian. The amber containing the fossil was mined in the Hukawng Valley, Myanmar.

The species name refers to Myanmar, the name of the country where the amber was found.
