= Leptoconops zherikhini =

Scientific classification
- Kingdom: Animalia
- Phylum: Arthropoda
- Class: Insecta
- Order: Diptera
- Family: Ceratopogonidae
- Genus: Leptoconops
- Species: †L. zherikhini

Binomial name
- †Leptoconops zherikhini Szadziewski & Arillo, 2003

Extinct species of fly

Leptoconops zherikhini is an extinct species of biting midges belonging to the family Ceratopogonidae. This species was described from fossilized remains preserved in Lower Cretaceous amber from Álava, Spain. These fossils represents the earliest known occurrence of extant genus Leptoconops.

This species was named in honor of Russian entomologist Vladimir Zherikhin.
