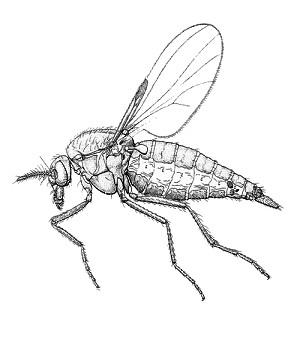

Scientific classification
- Kingdom: Animalia
- Phylum: Arthropoda
- Clade: Pancrustacea
- Class: Insecta
- Order: Diptera
- Family: Ceratopogonidae
- Genus: Leptoconops
- Species: L. torrens

Binomial name
- Leptoconops torrens (Townsend), 1893

= Leptoconops torrens =

Species of fly

Leptoconops torrens (commonly known as the biting midge fly) is a species of small biting flies in the no-see-um family Ceratopogonidae. They were first mentioned in writing by Charles Henry Tyler Townsend in 1893. The name Leptoconops carteri is a junior synonym of L. torrens. They are prevalent in the southwestern and southeastern areas of the United States. In early stages of life, L. torrens flies dwell in soil, then emerge to feed and breed as fully developed adults.

L. torrens females rely on blood meals from vertebrates for nutrition, while males feed on various plant products such as nectar. L. torrens infestations in California have caused people to take measures to control their populations. The flies are relatively small at around 1/16 inch (1.6 mm) long and are difficult to spot, making preventing L. torrens bites difficult. Construction projects and farming efforts have been temporarily suspended because of L. torrens biting activity.

== Description ==
=== Larvae ===
L. torrens larvae have 21 body segments and are 0.211 in (5.4 mm) long on average. The larva has a transparent body, and mouthparts are visible through the head. These mandibles are heavily chitinized, which differs from those of other species. The antenna retracts into the head with additional chitinized parts, and no eye organs are visible. Male and female larvae are indistinguishable by size.

=== Adults ===
Adults are close in appearance to the Bodega black gnat. Adult flies are about 1/16 inch (1.6 mm) long and are black in color. Female flies have 14 antennae segments. The females have relatively stout abdomens, and have no hairs around their eye area. Males also lack hair on the face.

== Distribution ==
U.S. states with recorded L. torrens populations

The species can be found from California to Utah, New Mexico, Texas, Mexico, and southeast Florida as well as the Caribbean. They have also been observed in Colorado and Nevada. Their emergences have typically been observed and recorded in California.

== Habitat ==
L. torrens dwells in places with alkaline clay soil; larvae dwell in the damp soil. Soil with clay composition of more than 40% is the most suitable. Requiring this clay soil limits where L. torrens can populate. When the clay soil dries, cracks are formed to allow for adults to emerge. L. torrens tends to be in areas with cracks less than 1 inch (25 mm) in width. They are also common in partially aquatic regions around the world, such as tropical and sub-tropical regions.

== Lifecycle ==
The life cycle of L. torrens is typically around two years.

=== Egg ===
A female will enter cracks in the soil and lay eggs for a few days. These eggs may be spread around due to rain that seeps into the cracks. Eggs split longitudinally for the larvae to emerge. Eggs and larvae end up at around 15 to 30 inches (380 to 760 mm) deep within the soil. When rains fall, larvae can more easily burrow through the mud.

=== Larval instars ===
Larvae occasionally enter diapause for more than 3 years under certain conditions, such as when the soil is not sufficiently moist for their development. The size of the fly can indicate how many years it spent as a larva. In the summer, larvae enter complete aestivation. When dormant, they are able to tolerate being submerged in accumulated rain water. Larvae typically become active once rain falls in the second winter of their larval stage.

=== Pupa ===
In early May, mature larvae burrow through cracks in the soil and pupate; this process is relatively short and estimated to be about five days. If the soil is too wet and cracks do not open, the larva will enter diapause. The pupation of L. torrens has not been widely observed.

=== Adult ===
Adults emerge from mid-May to June when soil is dry and cracks re-form. This period of emergence lasts around 4 to 6 weeks, depending on the season and year. The ratio of females to males emerging is generally 1.64. In the morning, flies crawl out to sun themselves and fly once the temperature is high enough. Emergence is especially abundant following heavy rain. Once fed on blood, females can mature and lay eggs. However, females may die from ruptured oviducts from egg pressure. Ovaries may contain 60 to 70 eggs.

== Food resources ==
=== Female diet ===
Female L. torrens feed only once, taking blood meals from vertebrates by burrowing into the feathers or fur of warm-blooded animals. There is evidence that females may also prey males if there are no warm-blooded hosts available. Before biting, flies explore the host before feeding for around 1.5 minutes. They are difficult to frighten away before biting, but are more easily shooed afterwards. Once the fly has fed, it defecates, sometimes with a drop of ingested blood. Feeding can take any time from 2 to 4 minutes. Because only the females feed on blood, L. torrens is considered a facultative hematophage.

=== Male diet ===
Males feed on nectar from plants or honeydew from other insects. If near sources of algae growth, they may also feed on algae or microbes on the algae to develop fat. L. torrens adults live for less than 12 hours without food and up to 5 days otherwise.

== Mating ==
Male L. torrens have been observed in dancing swarms, where mating occurs. The males typically emerge in the season earlier than the females do and are ready to mate as soon as the females emerge from their pupal state. The females are attracted to the swarming males and fly into the dancing swarms of the males and mate with the two insects oriented end to end.

== Interaction with humans ==
Females may bite humans, injecting saliva under the skin where blood then pools. Females tend to bite around the head and arms. Although small, these flies can leave swellings 1–2 inches (25–51 mm) in diameter. The bitten area initially becomes inflamed and red before shrinking. Allergic reactions and secondary infection are also concerns involving bites. Unlike some close relatives, L. torrens are not known to transmit any diseases.

=== Population control ===
L. torrens is a pest, especially in California, and has been the source of several infestations. The tendency for larvae to enter diapause causes large swarms to emerge in certain years. Construction projects and farming efforts sometimes had to be temporarily suspended in the past because of L. torrens bites. Various forms of DDT were used to control populations in the past. Since adult flies rest on grass before taking flight, using pesticides just before emergence can help control populations. Malathion, diazinon, and fenthion are insecticides that has been effective in decreasing adult emergence. No tested insecticides have been able to control L. torrens from their larval stage in the soil. Planting sugar beets, alfalfa, and tomatoes may deter L. torrens from breeding. There are also specialized traps to control the flies' emergence, using methods such as carbon dioxide attractants for large-scale population control.
