= Phaenobezzia =

Scientific classification
- Kingdom: Animalia
- Phylum: Arthropoda
- Class: Insecta
- Order: Diptera
- Family: Ceratopogonidae
- Subfamily: Ceratopogoninae
- Tribe: Palpomyiini
- Genus: Phaenobezzia; Haeselbarth, 1965

Genus of flies

Phaenobezzia is a genus of biting midges in the family Ceratopogonidae. There are more than 20 described species in Phaenobezzia.

== Species ==
These 23 species belong to the genus Phaenobezzia:

- Phaenobezzia astyla Spinelli & Wirth, 1986
- Phaenobezzia beni Meillon & Wirth, 1983
- Phaenobezzia chonganensis Yu & Shen, 1998
- Phaenobezzia cinnae (Meillon, 1936)
- Phaenobezzia griseipennis (Clastrier, 1958)
- Phaenobezzia mashonensis (Ingram & Macfie, 1923)
- Phaenobezzia maya Spinelli & Wirth, 1986
- Phaenobezzia mellipes Wirth & Ratanaworabhan, 1981
- Phaenobezzia nitens Liu, Ge & Liu, 1996
- Phaenobezzia nzuari (Vattier & Adam, 1966)
- Phaenobezzia opaca (Loew, 1861)
- Phaenobezzia pajoti (Vattier & Adam, 1966)
- Phaenobezzia pistiae (Ingram & Macfie, 1921)
- Phaenobezzia probata (Meillon, 1937)
- Phaenobezzia rara Saha & Gupta, 2001
- Phaenobezzia sabroskyi Wirth & Grogan, 1982
- Phaenobezzia spekei (Macfie, 1939)
- Phaenobezzia stuckenbergi (Haeselbarth, 1965)
- Phaenobezzia suavis Saha & Gupta, 2001
- Phaenobezzia tropica (Clastrier & Wirth, 1961)
- Phaenobezzia vacunae (Meillon, 1936)
- Phaenobezzia vulgaris Saha & Gupta, 2001
- † Phaenobezzia wirthi Szadziewski & Grogan, 1997
