= L. albiventris =

L. albiventris may refer to:

- Leptodactylodon albiventris, a frog species endemic to Cameroon
- Leptoconops albiventris, the white nono, nono blanc des plages or nono purutia, a midge species found in Polynesia
