= Leptoconops longicauda =

Scientific classification
- Domain: Eukaryota
- Kingdom: Animalia
- Phylum: Arthropoda
- Class: Insecta
- Order: Diptera
- Family: Ceratopogonidae
- Genus: Leptoconops
- Species: L. longicauda

Binomial name
- Leptoconops longicauda Yu, 1997

Species of fly

Leptoconops longicauda is a species of biting midges belonging to the family Ceratopogonidae. This species occurs in the Wudang Mountains, Hubei province, China.
