= Leptoconops gravesi =

Scientific classification
- Kingdom: Animalia
- Phylum: Arthropoda
- Class: Insecta
- Order: Diptera
- Family: Ceratopogonidae
- Genus: Leptoconops
- Species: †L. gravesi

Binomial name
- †Leptoconops gravesi Choufani et al., 2014

Extinct species of fly

Leptoconops gravesi is an extinct species of biting midge belonging to the family Ceratopogonidae. This species was described from fossilized remains preserved in Late Cretaceous amber from Vendée, France. The piece of amber containing the holotype specimen also preserved a scelionine wasp and an earwig nymph.

This species was named in honor of Didier Graves, the collector of the holotype specimen.
