= Leptoconops burmiticus =

Scientific classification
- Kingdom: Animalia
- Phylum: Arthropoda
- Class: Insecta
- Order: Diptera
- Family: Ceratopogonidae
- Genus: Leptoconops
- Species: †L. burmiticus

Binomial name
- †Leptoconops burmiticus Szadziewski, 2004

Extinct species of fly

Leptoconops burmiticus is an extinct species of biting midges belonging to the family Ceratopogonidae. This species was described from fossilized remains preserved in Burmese amber from the Lower Cretaceous. The amber containing the fossil was mined in the Hukawng Valley, Myanmar.

The species name refers to the former name of the country where the amber was found (Burma).
