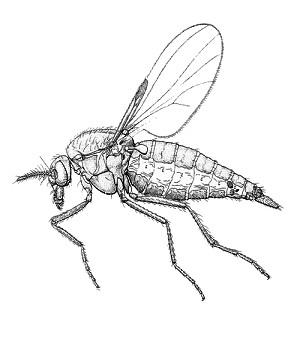
- Leptoconops sp.

Scientific classification
- Kingdom: Animalia
- Phylum: Arthropoda
- Clade: Pancrustacea
- Class: Insecta
- Order: Diptera
- Family: Ceratopogonidae
- Subfamily: Leptoconopinae
- Genus: Leptoconops; Skuse, 1889

Synonyms
- Tersesthes Townsend, 1893; Mycterotypus Noè, 1905; Schizoconops Kieffer,1918; Protersesthes Kieffer, 1921

= Leptoconops =

Leptoconops Temporal range: Hauterivian–Holocene

Genus of flies

Leptoconops (black gnat) is a midge genus in the family Ceratopogonidae. It has a mostly tropical or subtropical distribution worldwide, but some species occur as far north as Moscow region in Russia and the Yukon Territory in Canada.

This genus is relictual, having had a pantropical distribution during the Cretaceous. The presence of Leptoconops, along with Austroconops, in ancient Lebanese amber makes these the earliest existing lineages of biting midges. Extinct species have also been described from amber from Siberia, New Jersey, Canada, Hungary, Sakhalin, France, and Spain.

Adult Leptoconops females are diurnal feeders, and suck vertebrate blood. Adults of both sexes in some species rest by burying themselves in sand. Larvae feed on algae, fungi, and bacteria. They burrow in moist, usually saline, sand or mud of desert areas and coastal and inland beaches.

== Species ==
Leptoconops contains the following species:

- Leptoconops acer Clastrier, 1973
- Leptoconops albiventris de Meijere, 1915
- Leptoconops algeriensis Clastrier, 1975
- Leptoconops altuneshanensis Yu and Shao, 1988
- Leptoconops americanus Carter, 1921
- Leptoconops amplifemoralis Chanthawanich and Delfinado, 1967
- †Leptoconops amplificatus Borkent, 2001
- Leptoconops andersoni Clastrier and Wirth, 1978
- †Leptoconops antiquus Borkent, 2001
- Leptoconops arnaudi Clastrier and Wirth, 1978
- Leptoconops ascius Yu and Hui, 1988
- Leptoconops asilomar Clastrier and Wirth, 1978
- Leptoconops atchleyi Clastrier and Wirth, 1978
- Leptoconops auster Clastrier, 1981
- Leptoconops aviarum Gutsevich, 1973
- Leptoconops bahreinensis Clastrier and Boorman, 1987
- Leptoconops bossoi Clastrier, 1981
- Leptoconops belkini Wirth and Atchley, 1973
- Leptoconops bequaerti (Kieffer), 1925
- Leptoconops bezzii (Noè), 1905
- Leptoconops bidentatus Gutsevich, 1960
- Leptoconops binangulus Yu, 1989
- Leptoconops binisiculus Yu and Liu, 1988
- Leptoconops borealis Gutsevich, 1945
- Leptoconops boreus Kalugina, 1991
- Leptoconops brasiliensis (Lutz), 1913
- Leptoconops brevistylus Mazumdar, Saha & Chaudhuri, 2010
- Leptoconops bullsbrookensis Smee, 1966
- Leptoconops bundyensis Smee, 1966
- †Leptoconops burmiticus Szadziewski, 2004
- Leptoconops californiensis Wirth and Atchley, 1973
- Leptoconops camelorum (Kieffer), 1921
- Leptoconops capensis de Meillon and Hardy, 1953
- Leptoconops carteri Hoffman, 1926
- Leptoconops casali Cavalieri and Chiossone, 1966
- Leptoconops catawbae (Boesel), 1948
- Leptoconops chenfui Yu and Xiang, 1988
- Leptoconops chilensis Forattini, 1958
- Leptoconops chinensis Sun, 1968
- Leptoconops communis González & Tanase, 2026
- Leptoconops conulus Yu and Liu, 1990
- Leptoconops copiosus Borkent, 1996
- Leptoconops curvachelus Borkent, 1996
- †Leptoconops daugeroni Choufani, Azar and Nel, 2011
- Leptoconops demeilloni Clastrier and Nevill, 1984
- Leptoconops dissimilis Clastrier, 1975
- Leptoconops dixi de Meillon, 1936
- Leptoconops doyeni Spinelli and Ronderos, 1993
- †Leptoconops ellenbergeri Szadziewski, 2015
- Leptoconops endialis Smee, 1966
- Leptoconops exspectator Clastrier, 1975
- Leptoconops flaviventris Kieffer, 1918
- Leptoconops floridensis Wirth, 1951
- Leptoconops foleyi Clastrier, 1975
- Leptoconops fortipalpus Mazumdar, Saha & Chaudhuri, 2010
- Leptoconops foulki Clastrier and Wirth, 1978
- Leptoconops freeborni Wirth, 1952
- Leptoconops fretus Yu and Zhan, 1990
- Leptoconops fuscipennis Clastrier, Rioux, and Descous, 1961
- Leptoconops gallicus Clastrier, 1973
- Leptoconops golanensis Clastrier, 1981
- Leptoconops grandis Carter, 1921
- †Leptoconops gravesi Choufani et al., 2014
- Leptoconops halophilus Smee, 1966
- Leptoconops hamariensis Herzi and Sabatini, 1983
- Leptoconops harrisoni de Meillon and Hardy, 1953
- Leptoconops helobius Ma and Yu, 1990
- Leptoconops hutsoni Clastrier, 1974
- Leptoconops hyalinipennis Kieffer, 1918
- Leptoconops indicus (Kieffer), 1918
- Leptoconops interruptus (Enderlein), 1908
- Leptoconops irritans (Noè), 1905
- Leptoconops kerteszi Kieffer, 1908
- Leptoconops kinmenensis Lien, Lin, Weng and Chin, 1996
- Leptoconops knowltoni Clastrier and Wirth, 1978
- Leptoconops lacteipennis Kieffer, 1918
- Leptoconops laosensis Clastrier, 1974
- Leptoconops latibulorum Gutsevich, 1973
- Leptoconops laurae (Weiss), 1912
- Leptoconops linleyi Wirth and Atchley, 1973
- Leptoconops lisbonnei Harant and Galan, 1944
- Leptoconops longicauda Yu, 1997
- Leptoconops longicornis Carter, 1921
- Leptoconops lucidus Gutsevich, 1964
- Leptoconops mackerrassae Smee, 1966
- Leptoconops macfiei Clastrier, 1975
- Leptoconops melanderi Wirth and Atchley, 1973
- Leptoconops mellori Clastrier and Boorman, 1987
- Leptoconops mesopotamiensis (Patton), 1920
- Leptoconops minutus Gutsevich, 1973
- Leptoconops mohavensis Wirth and Atchley, 1973
- Leptoconops montanus Konurbajev, 1965
- Leptoconops montigenus Clastrier, 1981
- Leptoconops mooloolabaensis (Smee), 1966
- Leptoconops myersi (Tonnoir), 1924
- †Leptoconops myanmaricus Szadziewski, 2004
- Leptoconops nachitschevanicus Dzhafarov, 1961
- Leptoconops nevilli Clastrier, 1981
- Leptoconops nicolayi de Meillon, 1937
- Leptoconops nigripes Dzhafarov, 1961
- Leptoconops nigrithorax González & Tanase, 2026
- Leptoconops nipponensis Tokunaga, 1937
- Leptoconops nivalis Smee, 1966
- Leptoconops noei Clastrier and Coluzzi, 1973
- †Leptoconops nosopheris Poinar, 2008
- Leptoconops obscurus Smee, 1966
- Leptoconops panamensis Ronderos and Spinelli, 1993
- Leptoconops parvichelus Chanthawanich and Delfindao, 1967
- Leptoconops patagoniensis Ronderos, 1990
- Leptoconops pavlovskyi Dzhafarov, 1961
- Leptoconops peneti (Langeron), 1913
- Leptoconops petrocchiae Shannon and Del Ponte, 1927
- Leptoconops primaevus Borkent, 1995
- Leptoconops pseudoirritans González & Tanase, 2026
- Leptoconops pseudosetosifrons (Smee), 1966
- Leptoconops pugnax Clastrier, 1973
- Leptoconops reesi Clastrier and Wirth, 1978
- Leptoconops rhodesiensis Carter, 1921
- Leptoconops ricardoi Ronderos and Spinelli, 1992
- Leptoconops riverinaensis Smee, 1966
- †Leptoconops rossi Szadziewski, 2004
- Leptoconops rufiventris (Kieffer), 1923
- Leptoconops setosifrons (Smee), 1966
- Leptoconops shangweni Xu and Yu, 1989
- Leptoconops siamensis Carter, 1921
- Leptoconops sibericus Szadziewski, 1996
- Leptoconops smeei Wirth and Atchley, 1973
- Leptoconops spinosifrons (Carter), 1921
- Leptoconops stygius Skuse, 1889
- Leptoconops sublettei Clastrier and Wirth, 1978
- Leptoconops succineus Szadziewski, 1988
- Leptoconops tarimensis Yu, 1982
- Leptoconops tenebrostigmatus Mazumdar, Saha & Chaudhuri, 2010
- Leptoconops tibetensis Lee, 1978
- Leptoconops torrens (Townsend), 1893
- Leptoconops transversalis (Kieffer), 1921
- Leptoconops triangularis González & Tanase, 2026
- Leptoconops turkmenicus Molotova, 1967
- Leptoconops umbellifer Clastrier, 1981
- Leptoconops vargasi Clastrier and Wirth, 1978
- Leptoconops venezuelensis Ortiz, 1952
- Leptoconops vexans (Kieffer), 1921
- Leptoconops wehaiensis Yu and Xue, 1988
- Leptoconops werneri Wirth and Atchley, 1973
- Leptoconops whitseli Clastrier and Wirth, 1978
- Leptoconops woodhilli Lee, 1948
- Leptoconops xuthosceles Chanthawanich and Delfinado, 1967
- Leptoconops yalongensis Yu and Wang, 1988
- Leptoconops yunhsienensis Yu, 1963
- †Leptoconops zherikhini Szadziewski & Arillo, 2003
