= Leptoconops myersi =

Scientific classification
- Kingdom: Animalia
- Phylum: Arthropoda
- Class: Insecta
- Order: Diptera
- Family: Ceratopogonidae
- Genus: Leptoconops
- Species: L. myersi

Binomial name
- Leptoconops myersi (Tonnoir), 1924

Synonyms
- Acanthoconops myersi; Styloconops myersi

Species of fly

Leptoconops myersi, known by the common name of coastal biting midge, is a species of fly in the genus Leptoconops (the black gnats) and the family Ceratopogonidae (the biting midges) that is found in New Zealand.

It is a small fly, with a body 1.5 millimetres long and wings 1.15 mm long. The head, thorax and legs are dark brown to black and the abdomen and wings are whitish. The female bites humans and consumes blood. It is the only one of the 28 species of Ceratopogonidae that were described from New Zealand as of 1971 that is known to feed on blood.

The type specimen is a female that was collected from Tapotupotu Bay, near Cape Reinga, by J. G. Myers, a young entomologist from Wellington, in 1923. (Note: Dumbleton (1971) mistakenly said it was collected in 1924.) Myers had been attacked by small flies when just above high-tide mark. They settled on him in large numbers, some trying to get under his clothing, and bit fiercely. He collected specimens, all of which were female, and sent them to André Léon Tonnoir, an entomologist at the Cawthron Institute in Nelson who specialised in Diptera, and who then published a description of the species, naming it Acanthoconops myersi.

The species was subsequently noted at Tom Bowling Bay (near North Cape), Moturoa / Rabbit Island (near Nelson), Tairua Bay, Whangamatā and Matakana Island. Lionel Jack Dumbleton collected one male and many female specimens at Tom Bowling Bay in 1967.

Up to the 2000s, people reported a rash after being bitten by small insects on Coromandel Peninsula beaches. Entomologists assumed it would be L. myersi, but this was unproven. In 2006 specimens of the biting insect were collected at Colville Beach and Waikawau Beach on the peninsula and examination confirmed them to be L. myersi.

In 2019, 11-year-old entomologist Olly Hills identified L. myersi as the species known as the 'Mount mauler', which had been inflicting painful skin irritations to people above the high-tide line on beaches in the Mount Maunganui area for up to 50 years.
