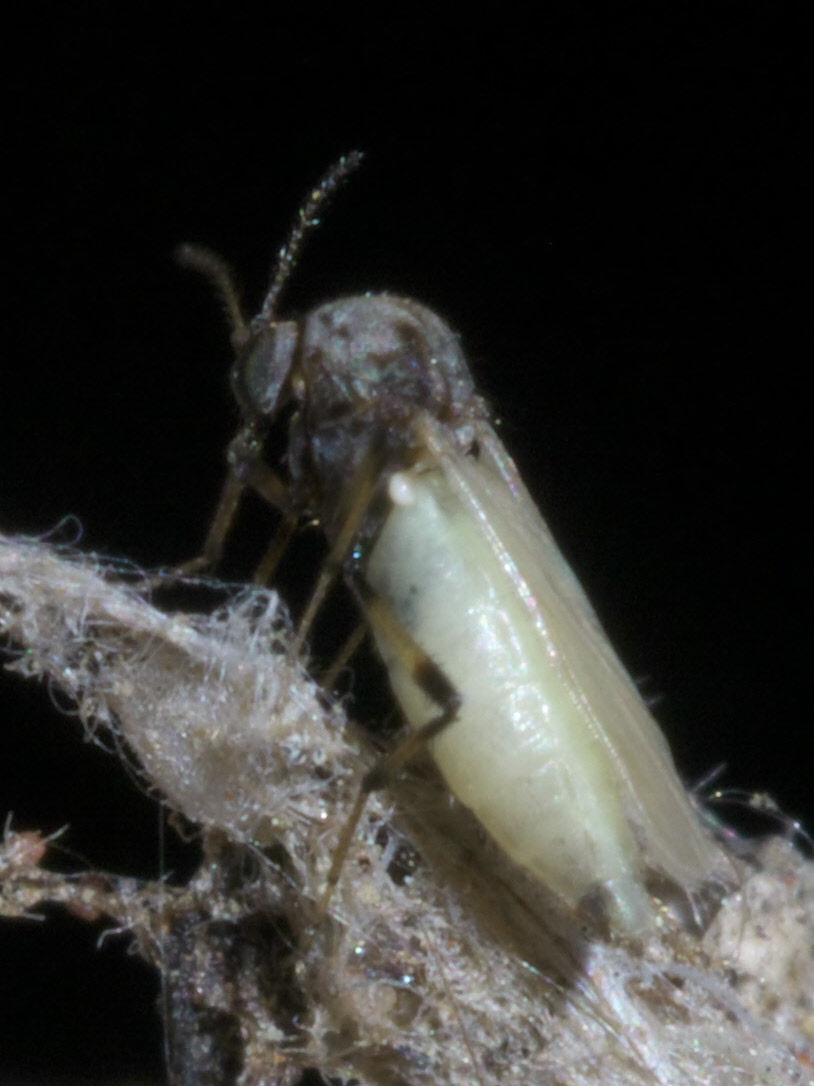

Scientific classification
- Kingdom: Animalia
- Phylum: Arthropoda
- Class: Insecta
- Order: Diptera
- Family: Ceratopogonidae
- Tribe: Palpomyiini
- Genus: Bezzia
- Species: B. nobilis

Binomial name
- Bezzia nobilis (Winnertz, 1852)

Synonyms
- Bezzia atlantica Wirth and Williams, 1957; Ceratopogon barberi Coquillett, 1901; Ceratopogon nobilis Winnertz, 1852; Ceratopogon setulosa Loew, 1861

= Bezzia nobilis =

Species of fly

Bezzia nobilis is a species of biting midges in the family Ceratopogonidae. It is widely considered one of the most common Bezzia species; it is found in Eurasian regions, all over the United States, Central America, and even into South American countries like Brazil. B. nobilis seem to prefer aquatic environments; they are commonly observed in stagnant water pools in Eurasia regions and marshes in the southern United States. Adults of this species are easily distinguished by their black and yellow striped legs. Pupae are recognized by their brown bodies, abdominal spines, and respiratory horns. B. nobilis larvae are distinguished by brown heads and white bodies. Little information is known on their life cycle or mating habits. B. nobilis is a predatory species. While some research suggests they mainly feed on larvae of other insect species, experiments suggest they prefer immobile, easy prey such as dead adult flies, bacteria, and protozoa.

== Description ==
=== Adults ===
B. nobilis is a medium-sized Bezzia species with wings ranging from 1.5 mm to 2.6 mm. Their white wings contain thin yellow veins that may give the wings a yellowish tint. Their legs have distinct stripes, with thick alternating bands of yellow and black. These black bands are located specifically on the bases and apices of the femurs and tibia of adult flies. Black setae cover the legs, particularly occurring on the black bands at the apices of the tibia and femurs. These setae are more numerous in males than females. Adult B. nobilis flies generally have thoraxes with colors varying by segment and sex.

==== Females ====
Female adult B. nobilis flies have curved claws. While upper portions of their body, like the head and antennae, are a darker brown or gray color, most females' abdomens are lightly colored with a range from white to yellow and covered in fine black setae. They have one pair of long yellow gland rods running along their body. Adult females have two asymmetrical spermathecae chambers that collect and store sperm, reachable through a short passage.

==== Males ====
Male adult B. nobilis flies have been described in less detail than females. Their abdomens are brown, but existing descriptions focus lies on their reproductive organ attached to the abdomen: the adeagus. Adeagi of B. nobilis males are arched, small and stout, tapering into a blunt dististyle, a blade-shaped accessory on the adeagus. Males, like females, have antennae on their heads, but they also sport yellow, fan-like plumage.

=== Pupae ===
B. nobilis pupae are 3.5 mm - 4.0 mm long. They have respiratory horns 0.22 mm to 0.27 mm long. The body of B. nobilis pupa is brown in color and covered in short abdominal spines.

=== Larvae ===
B. nobilis larvae are approximately 7.0 mm in length. Their brown colored heads are long, thin, and tapered, with a curved mandible and topped by two eyes. B. nobilis larvae have white bodies, and unlike adults have very few setae. The only setae are located on the last body segment where there are eight long ones neatly arranged in pairs.

== Distribution and habitat ==
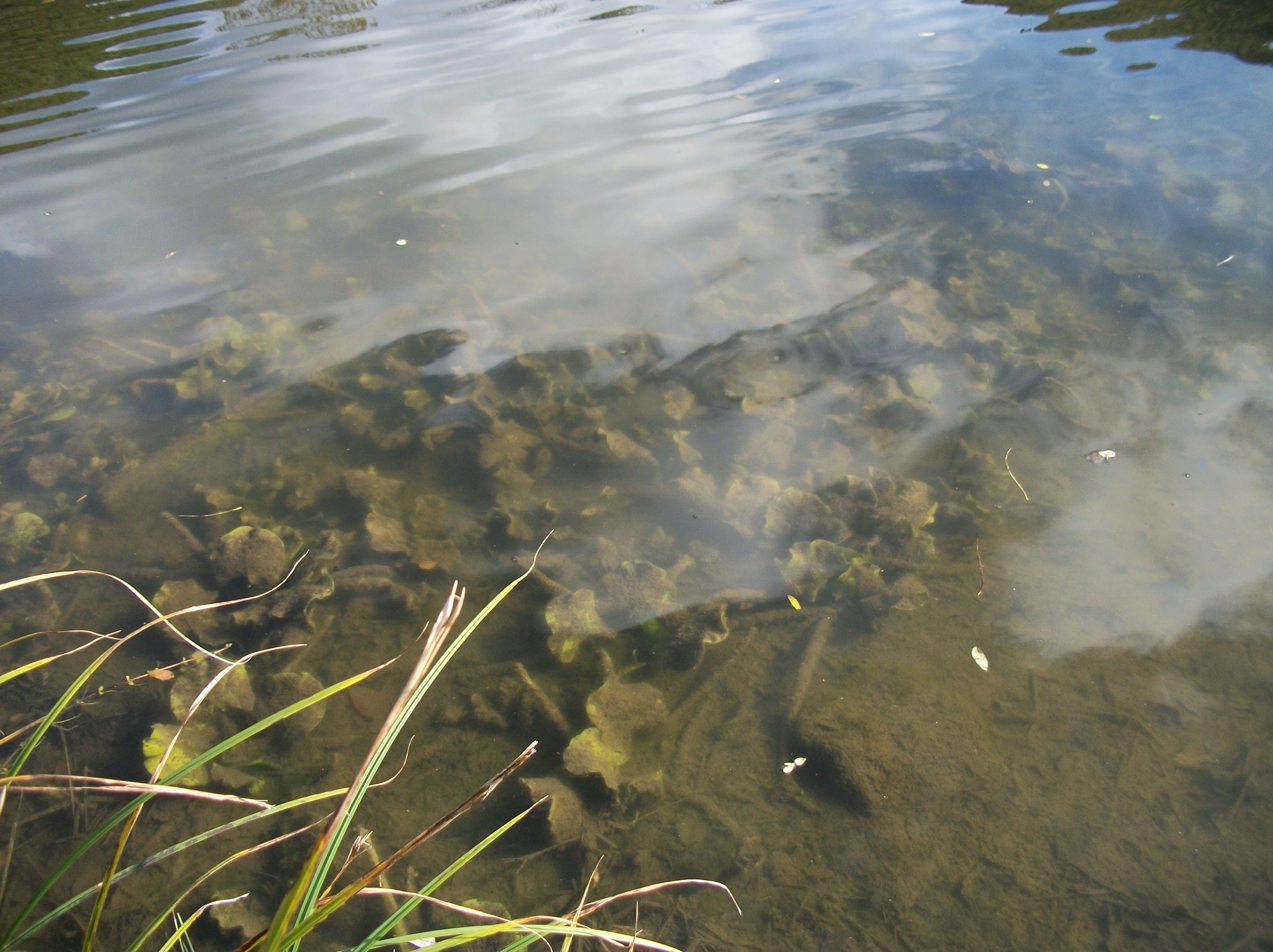
Typical habitat

B. nobilis is widely considered one of the most common of all Bezzia species. B. nobilis can be found across extensive regions of the world, occupying regions of Eurasia, covering North and Central America, and even being found as southern as Brazil and Uruguay. This is one of the largest distributions of all Bezzia species, covering a much greater area in comparison to most other species within the genus.

B. nobilis flies are often found living in sandy and muddy areas. They are especially associated with algae that grow near the edges of shallow pools of water.

In European regions, B. nobilis larvae have been found in sand or sand-silt that surround lakes, or stagnant pools of water in woody areas. Adult flies have been observed to mate in brackish water. In the southern United States, B. nobilis have been found in the marshes located within the Everglades National Park.

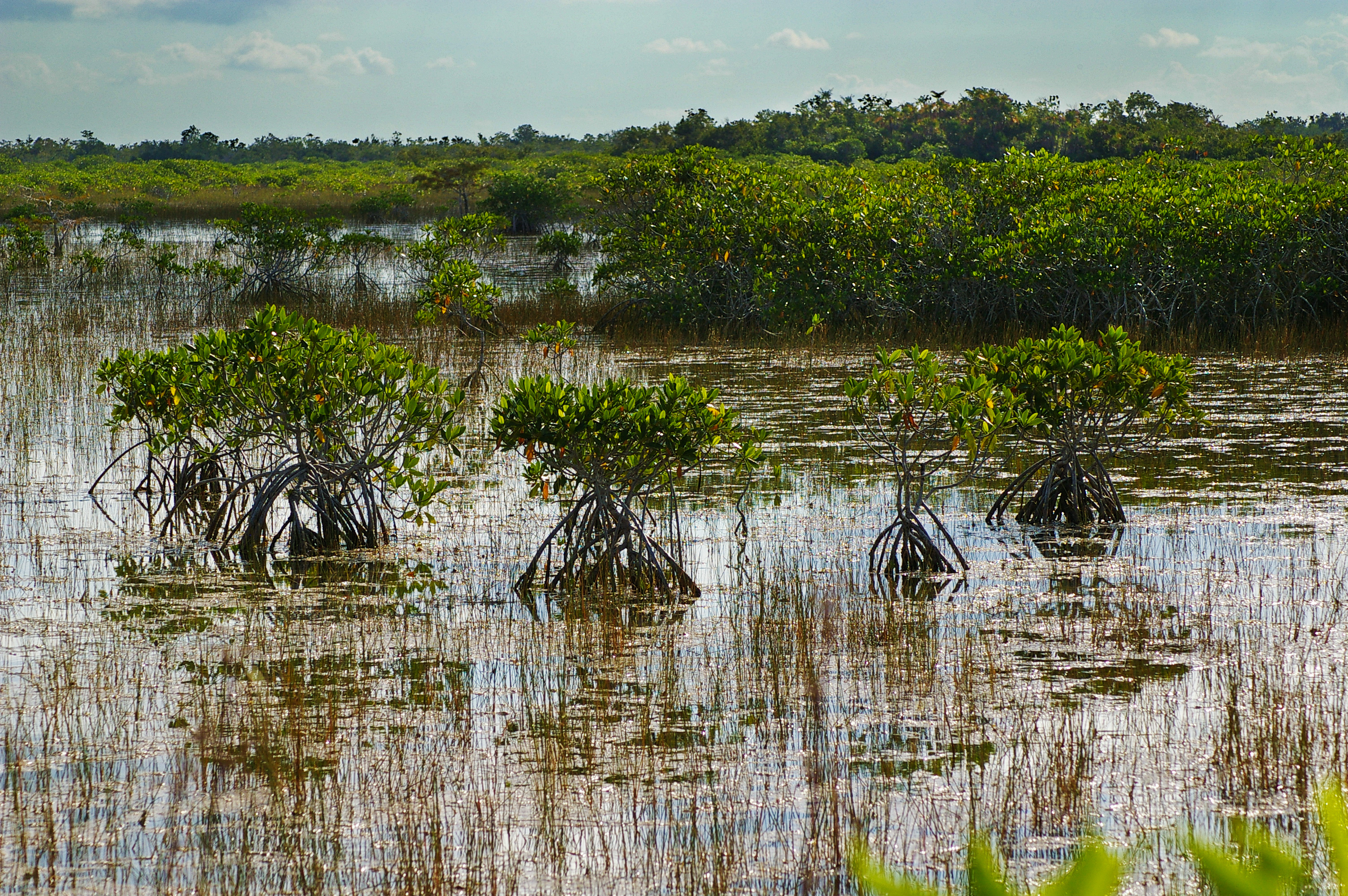
Everglades National Park

== Life history ==
Though the specifics describing the life cycle of B. nobilis are mostly unknown and research is lacking compared to many other Diptera species, description of the various life stages, suggest B. nobilis follows a life cycle similar to other Dipterans. Physical descriptions of B. nobilis exist for larva, pupa, and adults indicating B. nobilis at least moves through these three stages in life as many other flies do.

== Food resources ==
=== Predation on other flies ===
The feeding habits of Bezzia species are widely unknown, but the little research available suggests B. nobilis, and other closely related species are predatory, relying on other adults or larvae of other species as food sources. The brine fly Ephydra thermophylla was observed as a major prey item for B. nobilis flies living in hot springs.

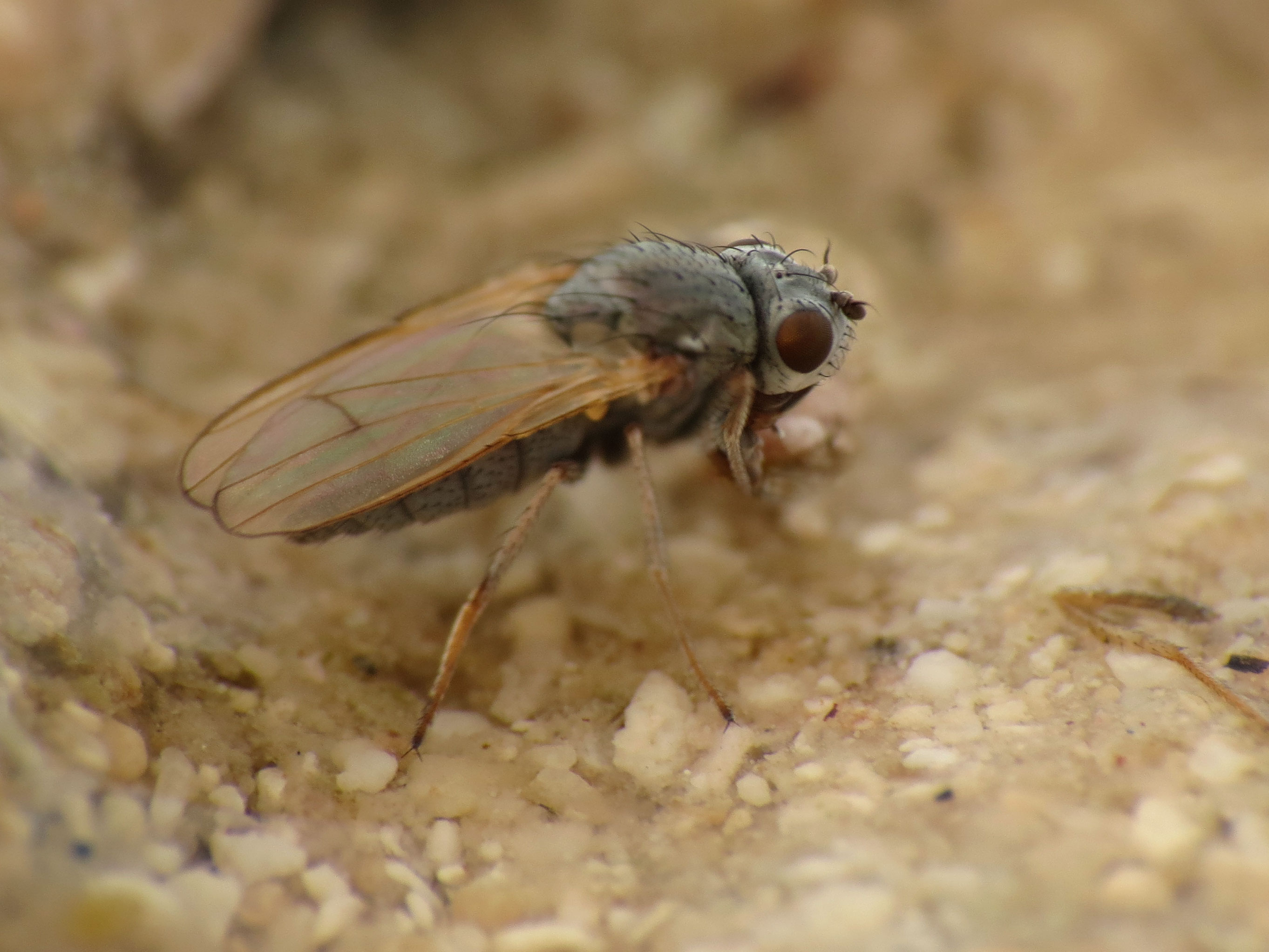
Brine Fly

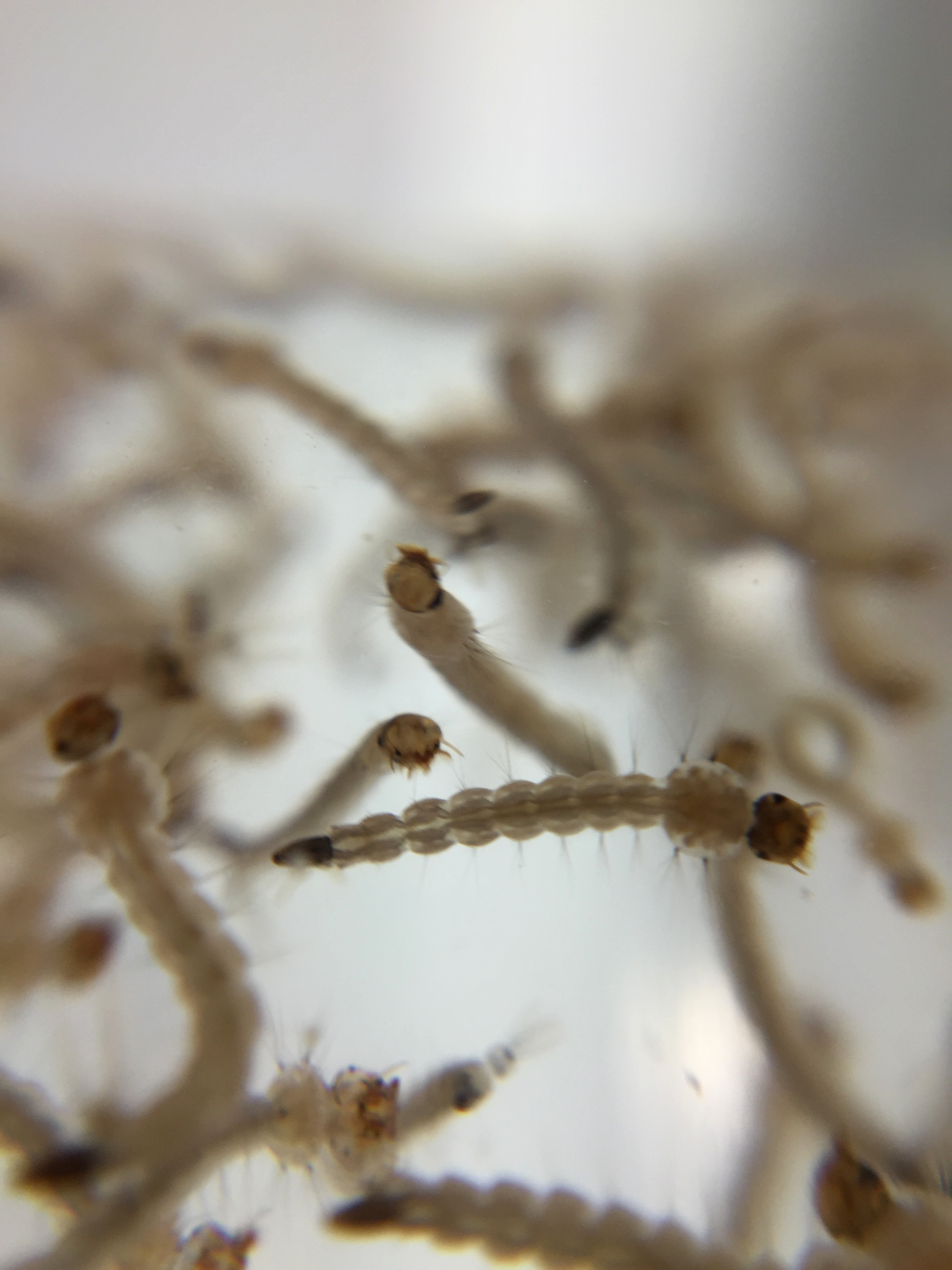
Aedes aegypti Mosquito Larvae

Much of the research available suggests larvae of multiple Bezzia species including B. nobilis seem to especially rely on mosquito larvae as prey. An experiment revealed that B. nobilis larvae easily gave up when mosquito larvae fought back. They did not observe any successful consumption of the mosquito larvae during this experiment, instead their lack of aggression led B. nobilis larvae to fail in preying on mosquito larvae, unlike another closely related species, Bezzia sp. nr. expolita. B. nobilis larvae did not successfully pupate when only given mosquito or other larvae to prey upon, but they did successfully survive on bacteria, protozoa, or dead adult flies. These observations suggest that B. nobilis are predatory in nature but prefer easy and immobile prey.

=== Feeding behavior ===
B. nobilis larvae failed to reach pupation on mosquito larvae alone. B. nobilis larvae were observed feeding on dead adult insects. To do this, they burrowed into the bodies of the adults and formed a bolus that they then swallowed. When forming this bolus, the larvae exhibited consistent behavior of a series of rhythmic motions. They gently moved their heads side-to-side, and once this motion stopped, switched to using their mandibles to form the bolus before bringing it into their mouths.

== Mating behavior ==
Though there is little research available on the mating habits of B. nobilis, they have been observed to mate in brackish water.

=== Females ===
The anatomy of female B. nobilis flies includes two asymmetric spermathecae chambers. Spermathecae are structures common to Dipteran species in which females are capable of storing sperm. Flies with spermathecae often allocate this sperm to eggs at some time after copulation has occurred.

=== Males ===
The physical description of male B. nobilis is less detailed than that of female adults and focuses on reproductive structures. Male B. nobilis adults have short, stout adeagi, that seem to complement the short chamber from which females' spermathecae are accessible. Their adeagi are external, and located on their abdomens, and only males of B. nobilis have yellow plumage on their heads.
