= Leptoconops brevistylus =

Scientific classification
- Kingdom: Animalia
- Phylum: Arthropoda
- Class: Insecta
- Order: Diptera
- Family: Ceratopogonidae
- Genus: Leptoconops
- Subgenus: Holoconops
- Species: L. brevistylus

Binomial name
- Leptoconops brevistylus Mazumdar, Saha, & Chaudhuri, 2010

Species of fly

Leptoconops brevistylus is a species of biting midge belonging to the family Ceratopogonidae. It occurs in the Damodar River valley, Jharkhand state, India.
