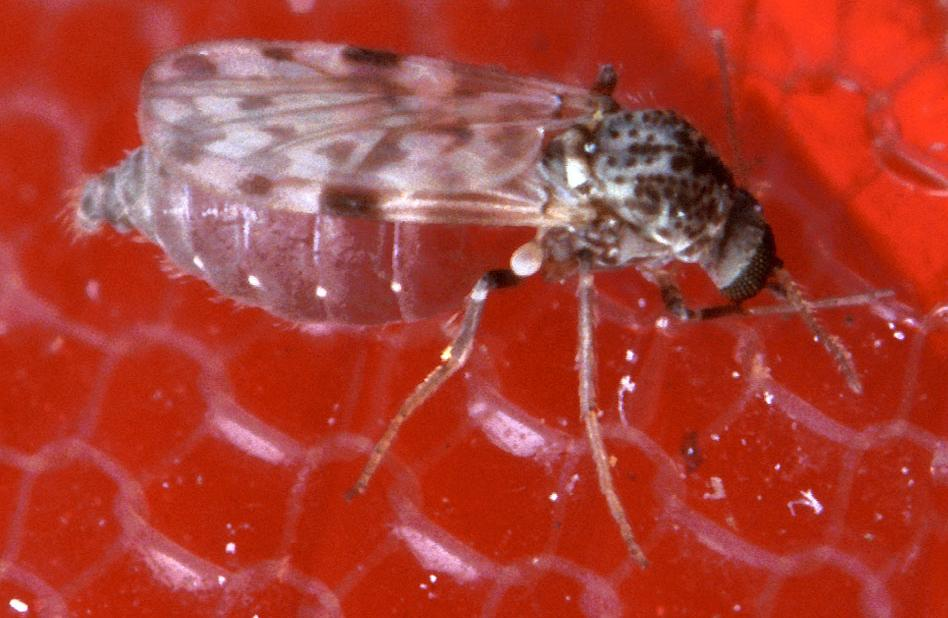
- Culicoides sonorensis after blood meal

Scientific classification
- Kingdom: Animalia
- Phylum: Arthropoda
- Class: Insecta
- Order: Diptera
- Family: Ceratopogonidae
- Subfamily: Ceratopogoninae
- Tribe: Culicoidini

Genera
- Several, see text

= Culicoidini =

Tribe of flies

The Culicoidini is a tribe of biting midges.

Genera include:

- Austroconops
- Culicoides
- Neoculicoides
- Paradasyhelea

It is not quite clear which taxa should be considered full genera, and which ones mere subgenera and included in Culicoides.
