= Leptoconops rossi =

Scientific classification
- Kingdom: Animalia
- Phylum: Arthropoda
- Class: Insecta
- Order: Diptera
- Family: Ceratopogonidae
- Genus: Leptoconops
- Species: †L. rossi

Binomial name
- †Leptoconops rossi Szadziewski, 2004

Extinct species of fly

Leptoconops rossi is an extinct species of biting midges belonging to the family Ceratopogonidae. This species was described from fossilized remains preserved in Burmese amber from the Lower Cretaceous. The amber containing the fossil was mined in the Hukawng Valley, Myanmar.

The species name honors Andrew Ross of The Natural History Museum, London.
