= Leptoconops albiventris =

Scientific classification
- Kingdom: Animalia
- Phylum: Arthropoda
- Clade: Pancrustacea
- Class: Insecta
- Order: Diptera
- Family: Ceratopogonidae
- Genus: Leptoconops
- Species: L. albiventris

Binomial name
- Leptoconops albiventris de Meijere, 1915

Species of fly

Leptoconops albiventris, the white nono, nono blanc des plages or nono purutia, is a midge species in the genus Leptoconops found in French Polynesia. It was accidentally introduced in the Marquesas archipelago in 1914.
