= Leptoconops kerteszi =

Scientific classification
- Domain: Eukaryota
- Kingdom: Animalia
- Phylum: Arthropoda
- Class: Insecta
- Order: Diptera
- Family: Ceratopogonidae
- Genus: Leptoconops
- Species: L. kerteszi

Binomial name
- Leptoconops kerteszi Kieffer, 1908

Synonyms
- Holoconops kerteszi Kieffer, 1908

Species of insect

Leptoconops kerteszi, common name Bodega black gnat, is a species of biting midges belonging to the family Ceratopogonidae. They feed on multiple species and can be found in places such as the United States, Egypt, and Tunisia.

== Description ==
The species appears black when viewed by the naked eye, but it appears brown when under a microscope. The head and thorax are dark brown while the abdomen is a lighter brown. Its wings are transparent, but they appear to be white when light reflects off their surface while they are folded on their back. Females are 2.5 to 3 mm (0.10 to 0.12 in) long and the males are 3.5 to 4 mm (0.14 to 0.16 in) long with a lighter brown than the females. It can be found in places such as the United States, Egypt, and Tunisia. The common name comes from Bodega Bay in California which is where the species was first studied; however, it was first found and scientifically named as Holoconops kerteszi in Cairo, Egypt, in 1908.

== Habitat and bites ==
This species breeds in the sand of lakes and marshes. Its breeding grounds are located at high tide in damp areas with no vegetation. Its larvae can be found in the first centimeter of its breeding ground in shallow sandy water. The adults feed on humans, domestic animals, and birds. Their bites cause swelling that progresses to exudation.

== Study ==
In a 1967 study, a large amount of the gnats were caught with a portable gasoline-powered device that had its suction tube replaced with a metal funnel. The insect suction sampler was used to capture specimens that were flying around a person's head by having them drawn through a mesh net into the funnel. It was used to analyze adult gnat populations. An insect suction sampler is a device that entomologists use to suck up insects for studies.
