= Palpomyia =

Scientific classification
- Domain: Eukaryota
- Kingdom: Animalia
- Phylum: Arthropoda
- Class: Insecta
- Order: Diptera
- Family: Ceratopogonidae
- Genus: Palpomyia; Meigen, 1818

Genus of flies

Palpomyia is a genus of flies belonging to the family Ceratopogonidae.

The genus has cosmopolitan distribution.

Species:

- Palpomyia abdominalis Kieffer, 1921
- Palpomyia aculeata Ingram & Macfie, 1931
