= Leptoconopinae =

Scientific classification
- Kingdom: Animalia
- Phylum: Arthropoda
- Clade: Pancrustacea
- Class: Insecta
- Order: Diptera
- Family: Ceratopogonidae
- Subfamily: Leptoconopinae; Noé, 1907

Leptoconopinae is the third most species-rich subfamily of biting midges and the included species may be found in the whole world except Antarctica.

== Systematics ==
The following genera and subgenera are included in the subfamily as of 2020 (subgenera are shifted to the right):

- †Archiaustroconops Szadziewski, 1996
- Austroconops Wirth and Lee, 1958
- †Fossileptoconops Szadziewski, 1996
- †Jordanoconops Szadziewski, 2000
- Leptoconops Skuse, 1889
  - Brachyconops Wirth and Atchley, 1973
  - Holoconops Kieffer, 1918
  - Leptoconops Skuse, 1890
  - Megaconops Wirth and Atchley, 1973
  - †Palaeoconops Borkent, 200
  - Proleptoconops Clastrier, 1974
  - Styloconops Kieffer, 1921
- †Minyohelea Borkent, 1995
