= Leptoconops antiquus =

Scientific classification
- Kingdom: Animalia
- Phylum: Arthropoda
- Class: Insecta
- Order: Diptera
- Family: Ceratopogonidae
- Genus: Leptoconops
- Subgenus: †Palaeoconops
- Species: L. antiquus

Binomial name
- Leptoconops antiquus Borkent, 2001

Extinct species of fly

Leptoconops antiquus is an extinct species of biting midges belonging to the family Ceratopogonidae. This species was described from fossilized remains preserved in Lower Cretaceous amber from Lebanon.

The species name antiquus (ancient) was given in reference to the great age of the fossil.
