= Austroconops =

Austroconops Temporal range: Early Cretaceous–Recent

Scientific classification
- Domain: Eukaryota
- Kingdom: Animalia
- Phylum: Arthropoda
- Class: Insecta
- Order: Diptera
- Family: Ceratopogonidae
- Subfamily: Leptoconopinae
- Genus: Austroconops; Wirth & Lee, 1959

Type species
- Austroconops mcmillani Wirth & Lee, 1959

Genus of flies

Austroconops is a genus of flies belonging to the family Ceratopogonidae (no-see-ums or biting midges).

Though the genus is currently restricted to Australia, fossil members are known from the Cretaceous of Eurasia. According to cladistic analysis, A. mcmillani and A. annettae are sister species, with the fossil species being more basal lineages.

Species:

- Austroconops annettae Borkent, 2004
- †Austroconops asiaticus Szadziewski, 2004
- †Austroconops borkenti Szadziewski & Schlüter, 1992
- †Austroconops fossilis Szadziewski, 1996
- †Austroconops gladius Borkent, 2000
- †Austroconops gondwanicus Szadziewski, 1996
- Austroconops mcmillani Wirth & Lee, 1959
- †Austroconops megaspinus Borkent, 2000
- †Austroconops perrichoti Dominiak, Szadziewski & Nel, 2018
- †Austroconops sibiricus Szadziewski, 1996
