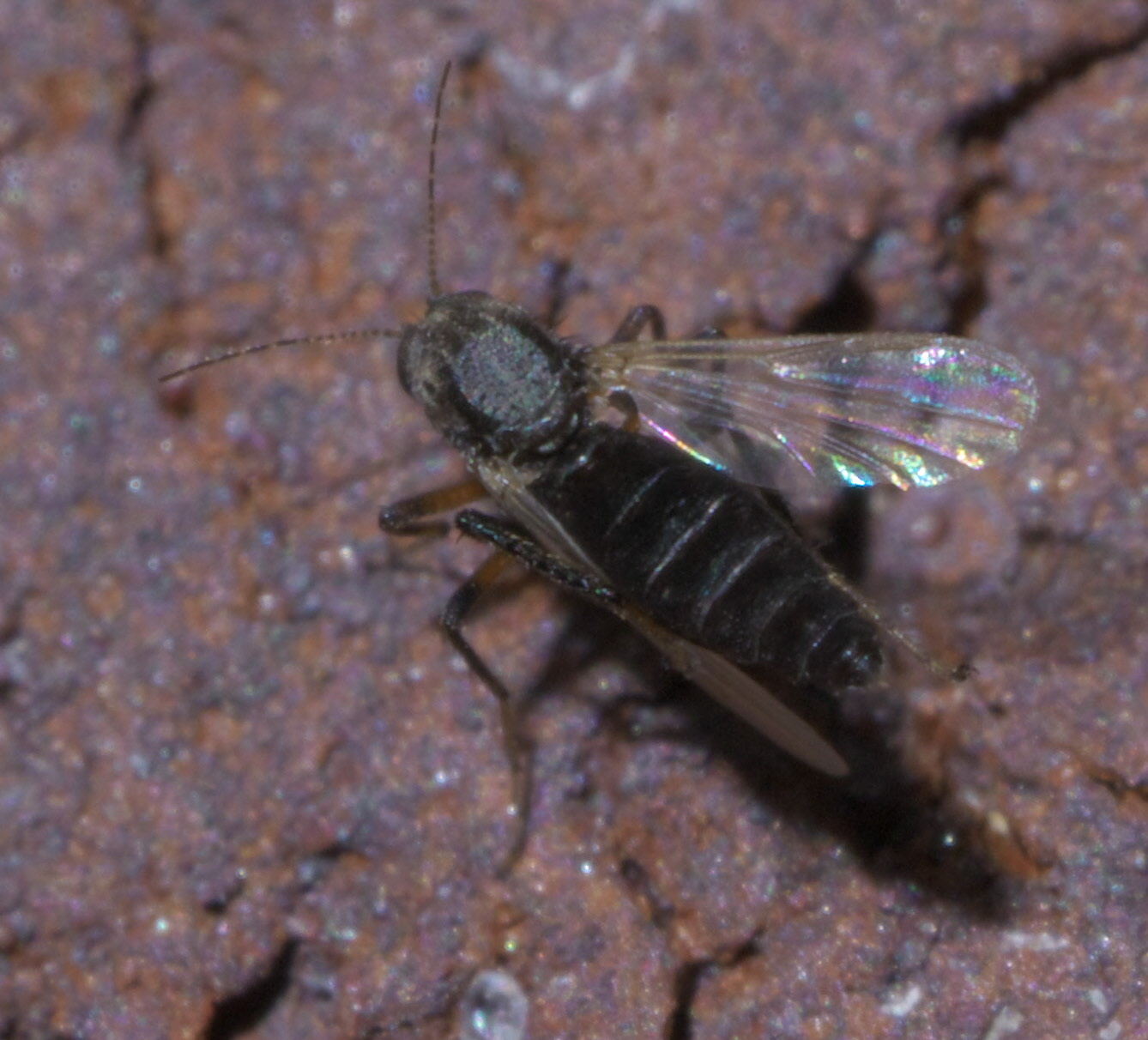
- Bezzia

Scientific classification
- Kingdom: Animalia
- Phylum: Arthropoda
- Class: Insecta
- Order: Diptera
- Family: Ceratopogonidae
- Subfamily: Ceratopogoninae
- Tribe: Palpomyiini

= Palpomyiini =

Tribe of flies

Palpomyiini is a tribe of biting midges in the family Ceratopogonidae. There are about 5 genera and more than 610 described species in Palpomyiini.

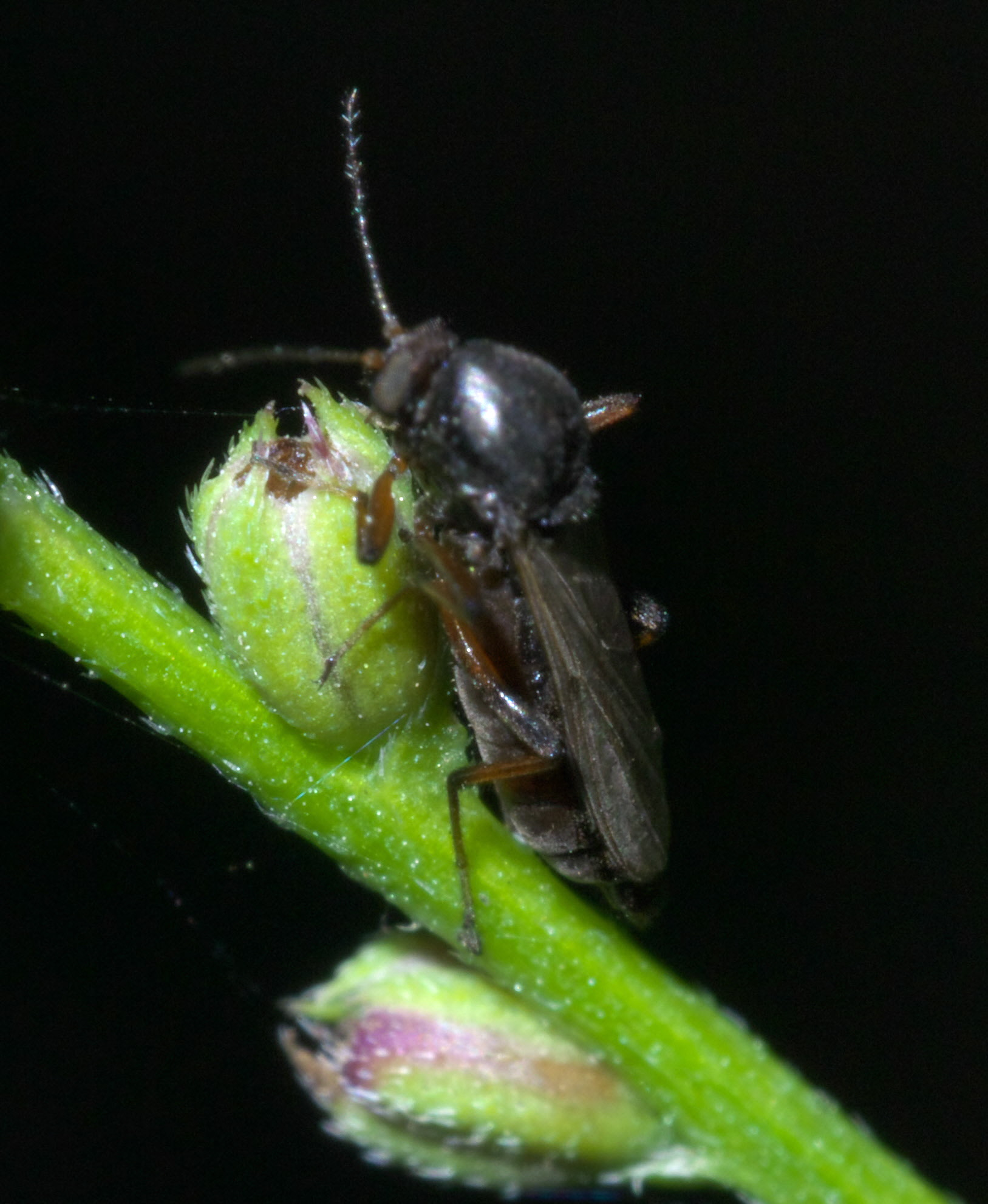
Palpomyia

== Genera ==
These five genera belong to the tribe Palpomyiini:

- Amerohelea Grogan & Wirth, 1981
- Bezzia Kieffer, 1899
- Pachyhelea Wirth, 1959
- Palpomyia Meigen
- Phaenobezzia Haeselbarth, 1965
