= Hematophagy =

Ecological niche involving feeding on blood

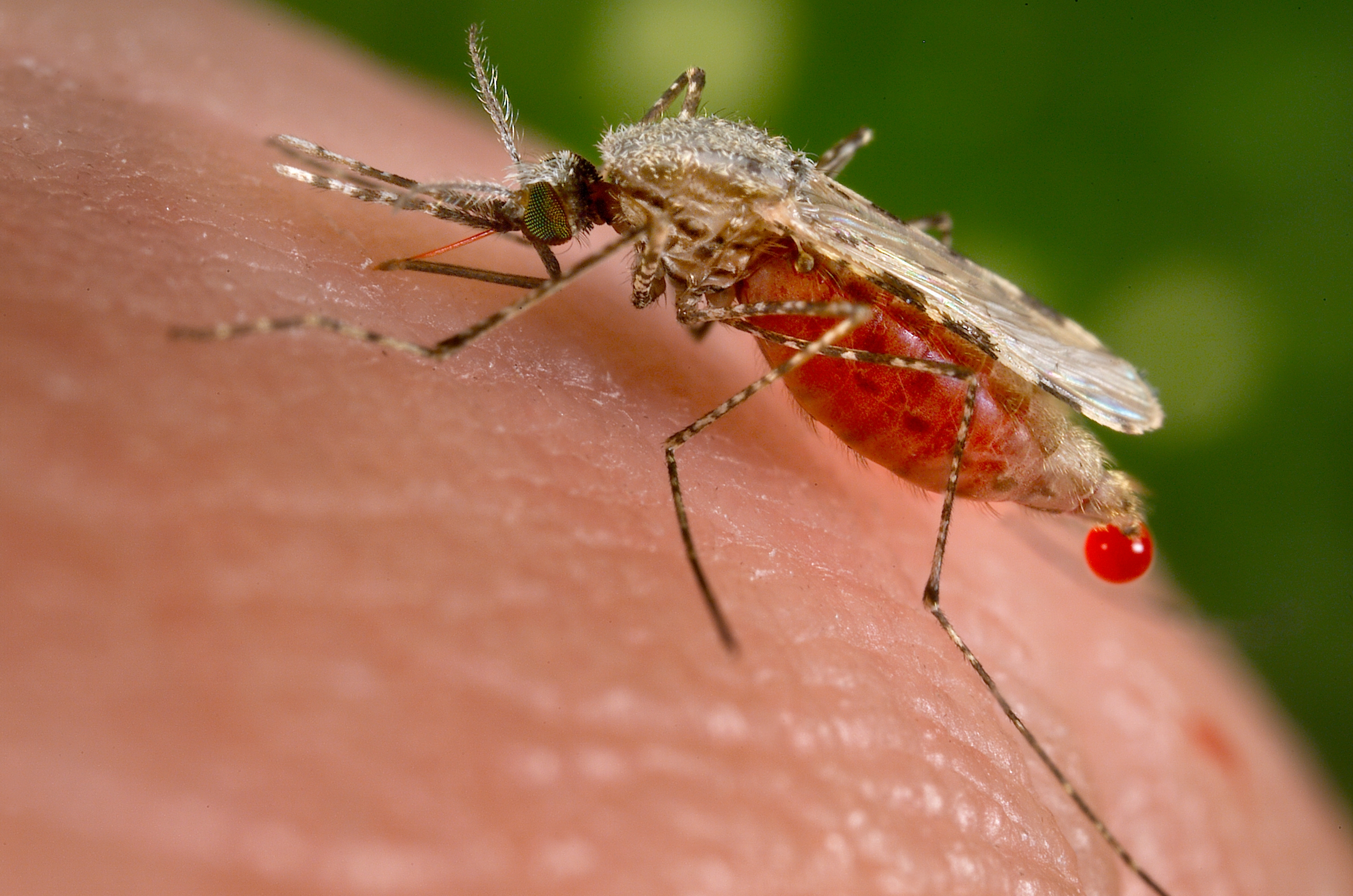
An Anopheles stephensi mosquito obtaining a blood meal from a human host through its pointed proboscis. Note the droplet of blood being expelled from the engorged abdomen. This mosquito is a malarial vector with a distribution that ranges from Egypt to China.

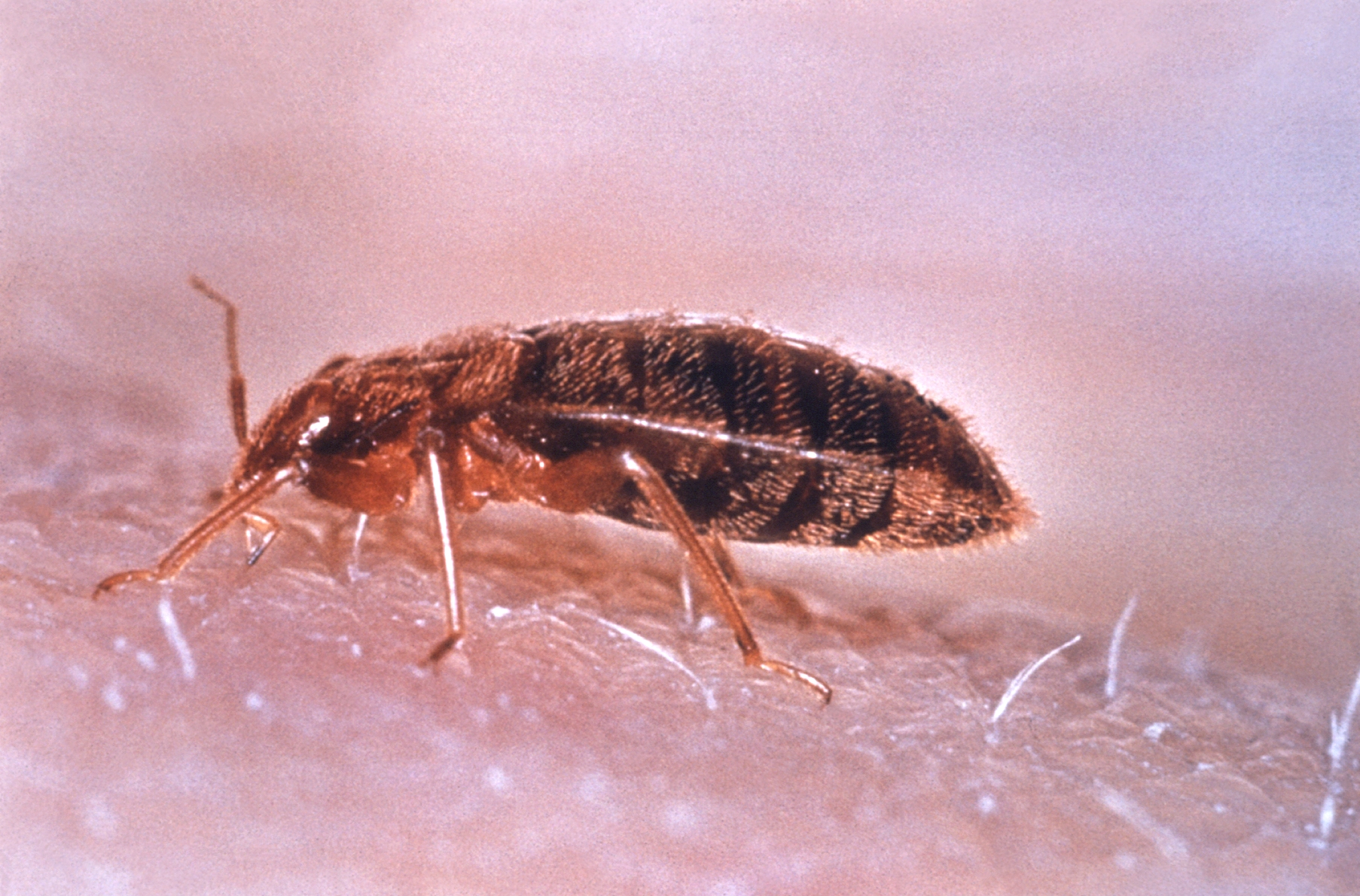
A bedbug

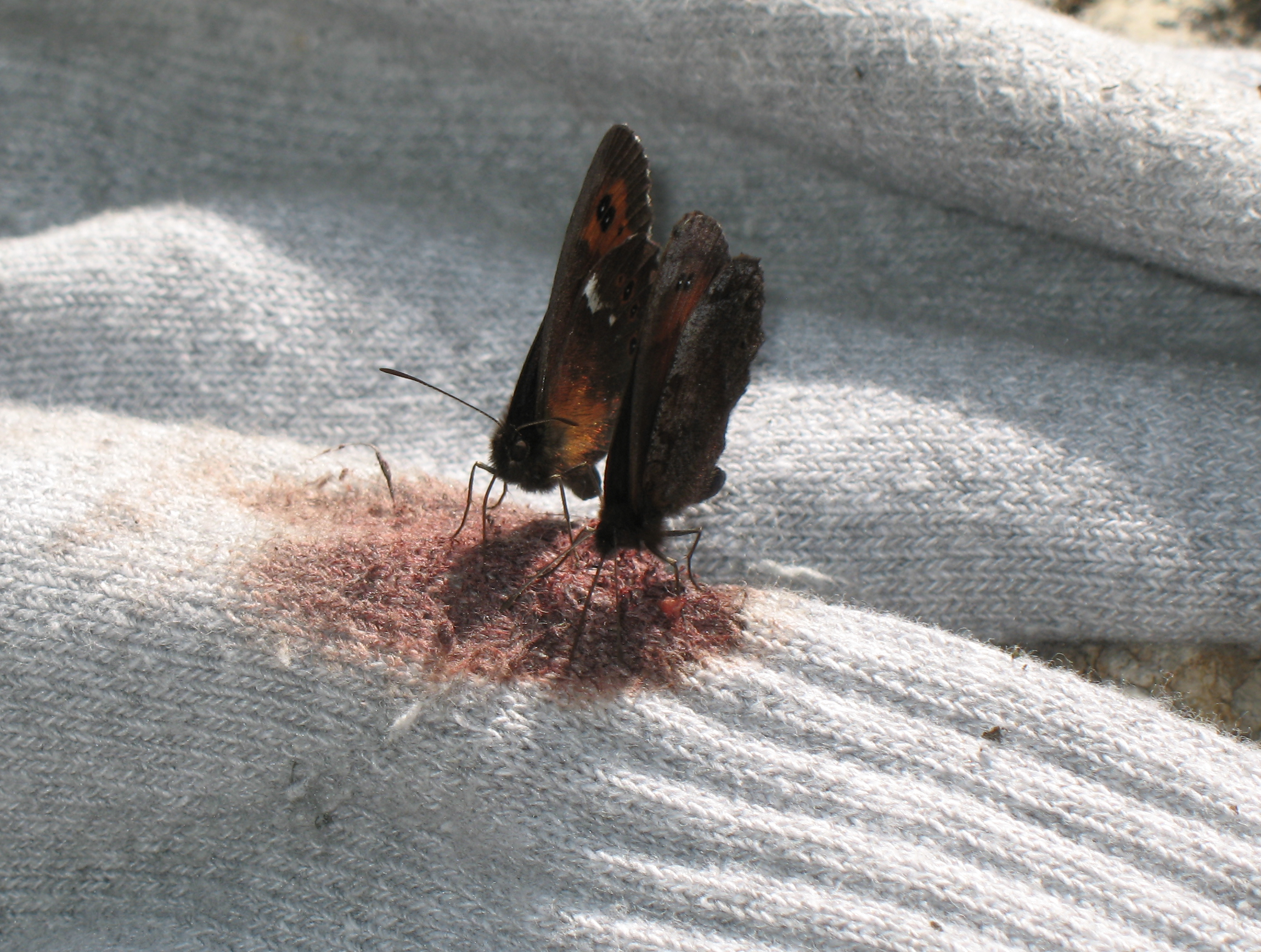
Two butterflies of the genus Erebia sucking fresh blood from a sock

Hematophagy (sometimes spelled haematophagy or hematophagia) is the practice by certain animals of feeding on blood (from the Greek words αἷμα haima "blood" and φαγεῖν phagein "to eat"). Since blood is a fluid tissue rich in nutritious proteins and lipids that can be taken without great effort, hematophagy is a preferred form of feeding for many small animals, such as worms and arthropods. Some intestinal nematodes, such as Ancylostomatids, feed on blood extracted from the capillaries of the gut, and about 75 percent of all species of leeches (e.g., Hirudo medicinalis) are hematophagous. The spider Evarcha culicivora feeds indirectly on vertebrate blood by specializing on blood-filled female mosquitoes as its preferred prey. Some fish, such as lampreys and candirus; mammals, such as bats (like the vampire bat), lions, tigers, and bears; and birds, including the vampire finch, Hood mockingbird, Tristan thrush, and oxpeckers, also practice hematophagy.

== Mechanism and evolution ==
Hematophagous animals have mouth parts and chemical agents for penetrating vascular structures in the skin of hosts, mostly of mammals, birds, and fish. This type of feeding is known as phlebotomy (from the Greek words, phleps "vein" and tomos "cutting").

Once phlebotomy is performed (in most insects by a specialized fine hollow "needle", the proboscis, which perforates skin and capillaries; in bats by sharp incisor teeth that act as a razor to cut the skin), blood is acquired either by sucking action directly from the veins or capillaries, from a pool of escaped blood, or by lapping (again, in bats). To overcome natural hemostasis (blood coagulation), vasoconstriction, inflammation, and pain sensation in the host, hematophagous animals have evolved chemical solutions, in their saliva for instance, that they pre-inject—and anesthesia and capillary dilation have evolved in some hematophagous species. Scientists have developed anticoagulant medicines from studying substances in the saliva of several hematophagous species, such as leeches (hirudin).

Hematophagy is classified as either obligatory or facultative. Obligatory hematophagous animals cannot survive on any other food. Examples include Rhodnius prolixus, a South American assassin bug, and Cimex lectularius, the human bed bug. Facultative hematophages, meanwhile, acquire at least some portion of their nutrition from non-blood sources in at least one of the sexually mature forms. Examples of this include many mosquito species, such as Aedes aegypti, whose both males and females feed on pollen and fruit juice for survival, but the females require a blood meal to produce their eggs. Fly species such as Leptoconops torrens can also be facultative hematophages. In anautogenous species, the female can survive without blood but must consume blood in order to produce eggs (obligatory hematophages are by definition also anautogenous).

As a feeding practice, hematophagy has evolved independently in a number of arthropod, annelid, nematode and mammalian taxa. For example, Diptera (insects with two wings, such as flies) have eleven families with hematophagous habits (more than half of the 19 hematophagous arthropod taxa). About 14,000 species of arthropods are hematophagous, even including some genera that were not previously thought to be, such as moths of the genus Calyptra. Hematophagy in insects, including mosquitoes, is thought to have arisen from phytophagous or entomophagous origins. Several complementary biological adaptations for locating the hosts (usually in the dark, as most hematophagous species are nocturnal and silent to avoid detection) have also evolved, such as special physical or chemical detectors for sweat components, CO_{2}, heat, light, movement, etc.

In addition to these biological adaptations that have evolved to help blood-feeding arthropods locate hosts, there is evidence that RNA from host species may also be taken up and have regulatory consequences in blood feeding insects. A study on the yellow fever mosquito Aedes aegypti has shown that human blood microRNA has-miR-21 are taken up during blood feeding and transported into the fat body tissues. Once in the fat body they target and regulate mosquito genes such as vitellogenin, which is a yolk protein used for egg production.

== Medical importance ==
The phlebotomic action opens a channel for contamination of the host species with bacteria, viruses and blood-borne parasites contained in the hematophagous organism. Thus, many animal and human infectious diseases are transmitted by hematophagous species, such as the bubonic plague, Chagas disease, dengue fever, eastern equine encephalitis, filariasis, leishmaniasis, Lyme disease, malaria, rabies, scrub typhus, sleeping sickness, St. Louis encephalitis, tularemia, typhus, Rocky Mountain spotted fever, West Nile fever, Zika fever, and many others.

Insects and arachnids of medical importance for being hematophagous, at least in some species, include the sandfly, blackfly, tsetse fly, bedbug, assassin bug, mosquito, tick, louse, mite, midge, and flea.

Many blood-feeding insects and arachnids, including mosquitoes, tsetse flies, kissing bugs, bed bugs, and ticks, rely on 4-hydroxyphenylpyruvate dioxygenase (HPPD) to degrade excess tyrosine after a bloodmeal. Inhibiting HPPD with compounds such as nitisinone causes lethal tyrosine accumulation, killing vectors after feeding and, in mosquitoes, even after brief contact with treated surfaces. This distinct metabolic vulnerability offers a potential route for broad-spectrum vector control beyond conventional neurotoxic insecticides.

Hematophagous organisms have been used by physicians for beneficial purposes (hirudotherapy). Some doctors now use leeches to prevent the clotting of blood on some wounds following surgery or trauma. The anticoagulants in the laboratory-raised leeches' saliva keeps fresh blood flowing to the site of an injury, actually preventing infection and increasing chances of full recovery. In a recent study a genetically engineered drug called desmoteplase based on the saliva of Desmodus rotundus (a vampire bat) was shown to improve recovery in stroke patients.

== Human hematophagy ==
Many human societies also drink blood or use it to manufacture foodstuffs and delicacies. Cow blood mixed with milk, for example, is a mainstay food of the African Maasai. Many places around the world eat blood sausage. Some societies, such as the Moche, had ritual hematophagy, as well as the Scythians, a nomadic people of Eastern Europe, who drank the blood of the first enemy they killed in battle. Psychiatric cases of patients performing hematophagy also exist. Sucking or licking one's own blood from a wound to clean it is also a common human behavior, and in small enough quantities is not considered taboo. Finally, human vampirism has been a persistent object of literary and cultural attention.

== See also ==
- Chupacabra
- Consumer–resource interactions
- Natural reservoir
- Tick-borne disease
- Zoonosis
- Vampire
