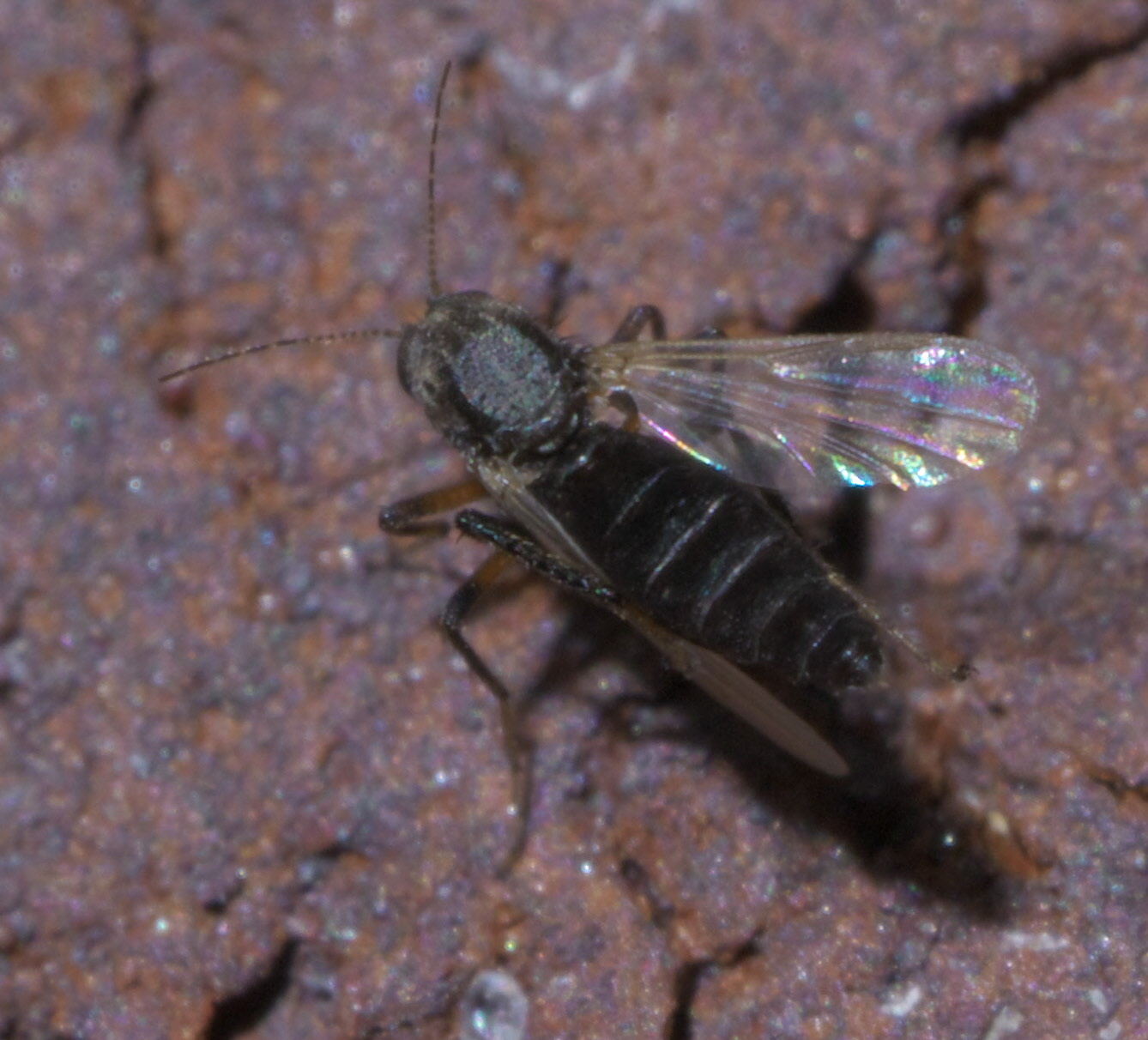

Scientific classification
- Domain: Eukaryota
- Kingdom: Animalia
- Phylum: Arthropoda
- Class: Insecta
- Order: Diptera
- Family: Ceratopogonidae
- Subfamily: Ceratopogoninae
- Tribe: Palpomyiini
- Genus: Bezzia; Kieffer, 1899

Diversity
- at least 310 species

= Bezzia =

Genus of flies

Bezzia is a genus of biting midges in the family Ceratopogonidae. There are more than 310 described species in Bezzia.

== See also ==
- List of Bezzia species
