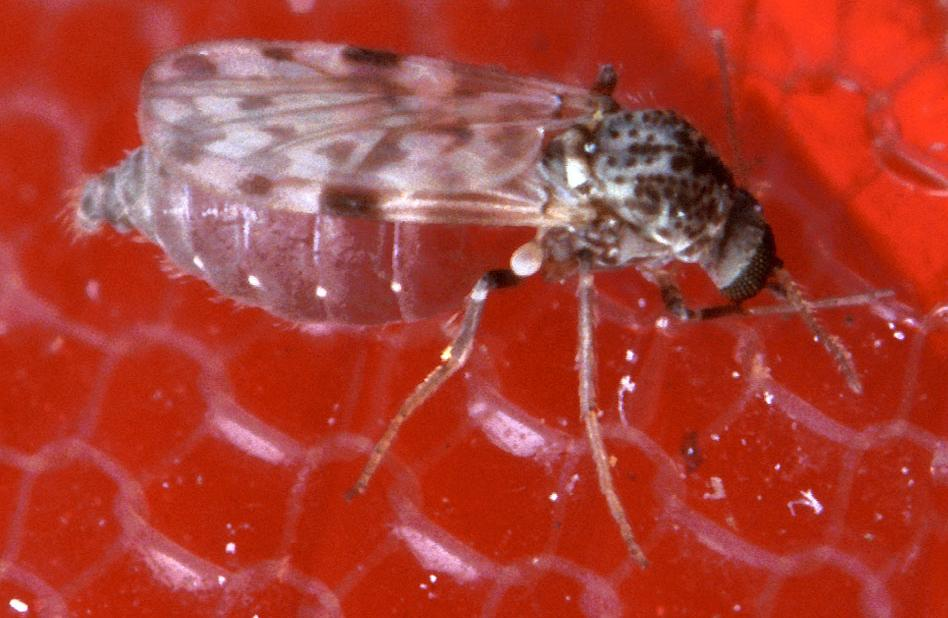
- A female biting midge, Culicoides sonorensis

Scientific classification
- Kingdom: Animalia
- Phylum: Arthropoda
- Clade: Pancrustacea
- Class: Insecta
- Order: Diptera
- Suborder: Nematocera
- Infraorder: Culicomorpha
- Superfamily: Chironomoidea
- Family: Ceratopogonidae; Newman, 1834

Subfamilies and tribes
- †Lebanoculicoidinae; Leptoconopinae; †Atriculicoidinae; Forcipomyiinae; Dasyheleini; Forcipomyiini; Ceratopogoninae; Culicoidini; Ceratopogonini; Heteromyiini; Hebetulini; Johannsenomyiini; Sphaeromiini; Palpomyiini; Stenoxenini

= Ceratopogonidae =

Ceratopogonidae Temporal range: Berriasian–Recent

Family of flies commonly known as no see ums, or biting midges

Ceratopogonidae is a family of midges, colloquially known as no-see-ums, sand flies, or biting midges, generally 1–3 millimetres (1/16–1/8 in) in length. The family includes more than 5,000 species, distributed worldwide, apart from the Antarctic and the Arctic. Ceratopogonidae midges are also one of the best-studied cocoa pollinators.

== Biology ==
Ceratopogonidae are holometabolous, meaning their development includes four life stages: egg, larva, pupa, and imago or adult. Most common species in warmer climates will take about two to six weeks to complete a life cycle. Both adult males and females feed on nectar. Most females also feed on the blood of vertebrates, including humans, to get protein for egg-laying. Their bites are painful, and can cause intensely itchy lesions due to the body producing histamines in response to the proteins from the midges' saliva. Their mouthparts are well-developed for cutting the skin of their hosts. Some species prey on other insects.

Larvae need moisture to develop, but also air and food. They are not strictly aquatic or terrestrial.

Some species within the biting midges are thought to be predatory on other small insects. In particular, mosquito larvae have been investigated as common prey for biting midges in the genus Bezzia. For example, experiments have been conducted on the species Bezzia nobilis that suggest their reliance on mosquito larvae as one source of prey. They can also be hematophagous parasites of invertebrates, depending on whether the bloodsucking attack is fatal.

Like other bloodsucking flies, Culicoides species can be vectors of disease-causing pathogens. Among diseases transmitted are the parasitic nematodes Mansonella, bluetongue disease, African horse sickness, epizootic hemorrhagic disease, arboviruses, and nonviral animal pathogens.

Historically, numbers were managed with the insecticide DDT as with Leptoconops torrens populations in California. They can be trapped by luring them with carbon dioxide. Most midges are small enough to pass through ordinary insect window screening. They can be repelled with DEET, oil of Eucalyptus, or Icaridin. Their larvae have also been shown to be susceptible to treatment with commercially available preparations of Bacillus thuringiensis israelensis.

== Subfamilies ==
Leptoconopinae is a subfamily of biting midges. The larvae are recognized by their unique sclerites of the head, and by their mouthparts.

Forcipomyiinae is another subfamily of biting midges. In this subfamily, both anterior and posterior prolegs are present on the larvae. Larvae are both terrestrial and aquatic, and feed primarily on algae and fungi. Some species are important pollinators of tropical crops such as the cocoa bean.

Larvae of species in the Dasyheleinae subfamily are characterized by an anal segment with retractile posterior prolegs. Larvae are aquatic and adults do not feed on vertebrate blood, nor do they prey on other insects. They take nectar only, an unusual feeding behavior within the Ceratopogonidae.

The Ceratopogoninae subfamily has elongated larvae without prolegs or hooks. Most larvae of this subfamily are predatory. Adults generally take vertebrate blood or attack other insects. Most females in the subfamily Ceratopogoninae feed on insects similar to them in size.

The oldest known member of the family is Archiaustroconops besti from the Purbeck Group of Dorset, England, dating to the Berriasian, around 142 million years ago.

=== Systematics ===
Basal lineages

- †Lebanoculicoides Szadziewski 1996 Lebanese amber, Barremian, Spanish amber, Albian
- Subfamily Leptoconopinae Noe 1907
  - †Archiaustroconops Szadziewski 1996 Durlston Formation, United Kingdom, Berriasian, Lebanese amber, Barremian, Jordanian amber, Spanish amber, Albian, Burmese amber, Myanmar, Cenomanian
  - Austroconops Wirth and Lee 1958 Barremian–Present
  - †Fossileptoconops Szadziewski 1996 Lebanese amber, Barremian
  - †Jordanoconops Szadziewski 2000 Jordanian amber, Albian
  - Leptoconops Skuse 1889 Barremian–Present
  - †Minyohelea Borkent 1995 Austrian amber, Hauterivian Lebanese amber, Barremian, Spanish amber, Albian, Canadian amber, Campanian
- †Archiculicoides Szadziewski 1996 Lebanese amber, Barremian
- †Gerontodacus Borkent 2019 Lebanese amber, Barremian, Spanish amber, Albian
- †Protoculicoides Boesel 1937 Burmese amber, Myanmar, Cenomanian, Canadian amber, Campanian
- †Atriculicoides Remm 1976 Spanish amber, Albian Durtal amber, France, Cenomanian, Burmese amber, Myanmar, Cenomanian, Taimyr amber, Russia, Cenomanian, Santonian
- Dasyhelea Kieffer 1913
- Subfamily Forcipomyiinae
  - Atrichopogon Kieffer 1906
  - Forcipomyia Meigen, 1818
- †Adelohelea Borkent 1995 Hungarian amber, Santonian, Canadian amber, Campanian
- †Heleageron Borkent 1995 New Jersey amber, Turonian Canadian amber, Campanian
- †Alautunmyia Borkent 1996 New Jersey amber, Turonian

== Gallery ==
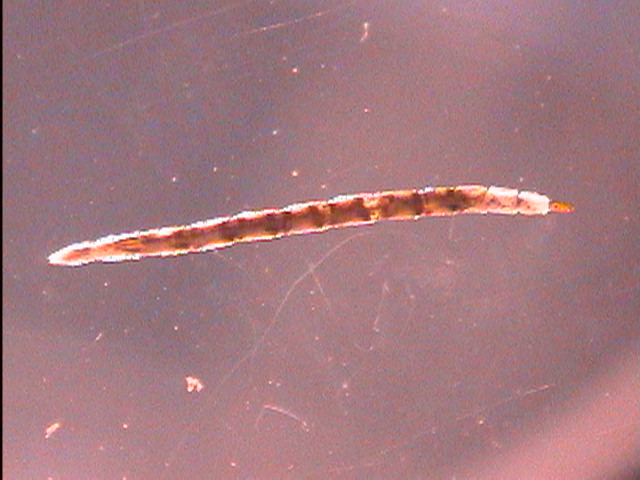
Larval stage of a ceratopogonid species

Atrichopogon sp. on Oedemera virescens

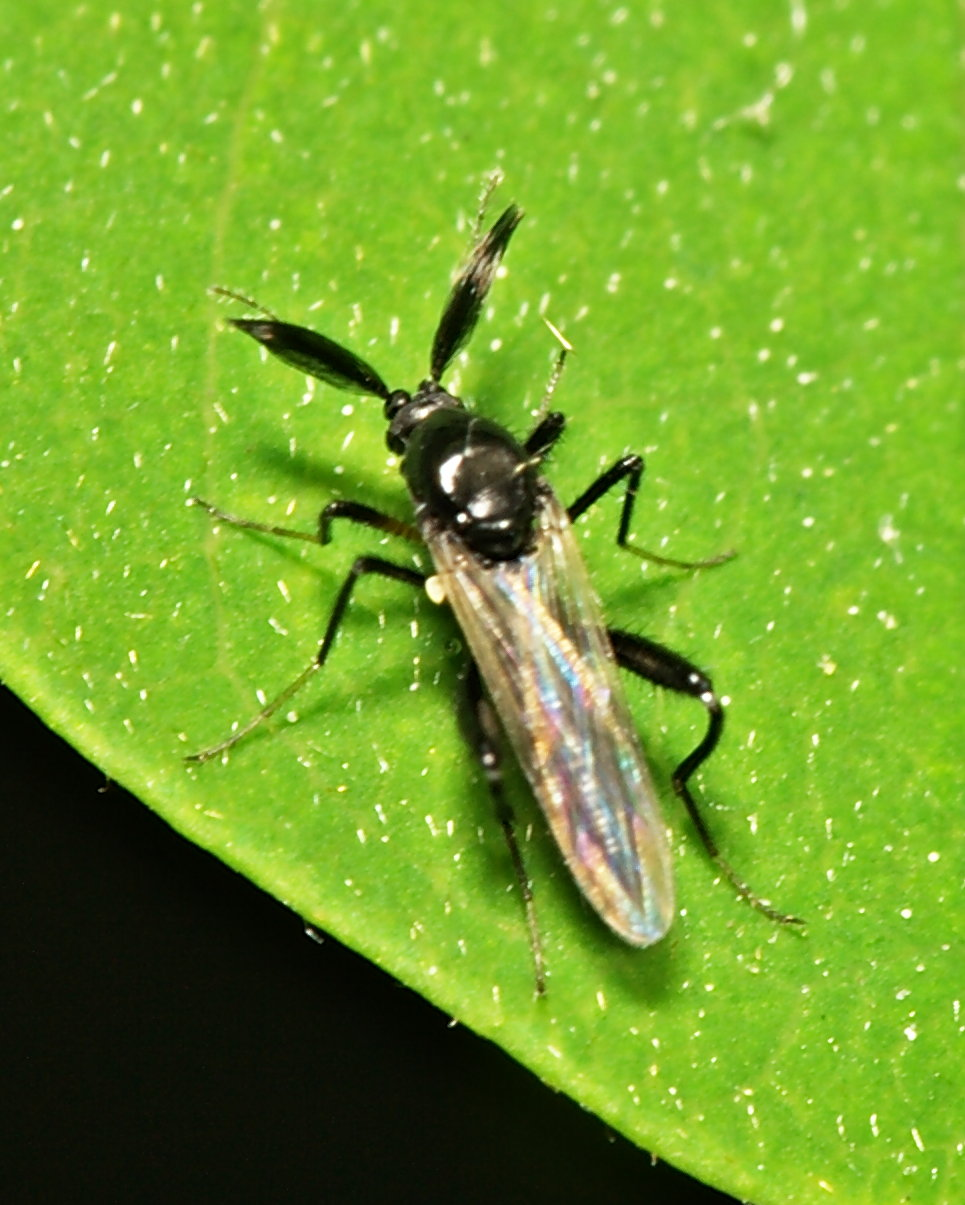
Ceratopogonid male

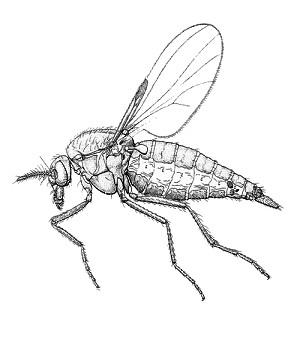
Leptoconops

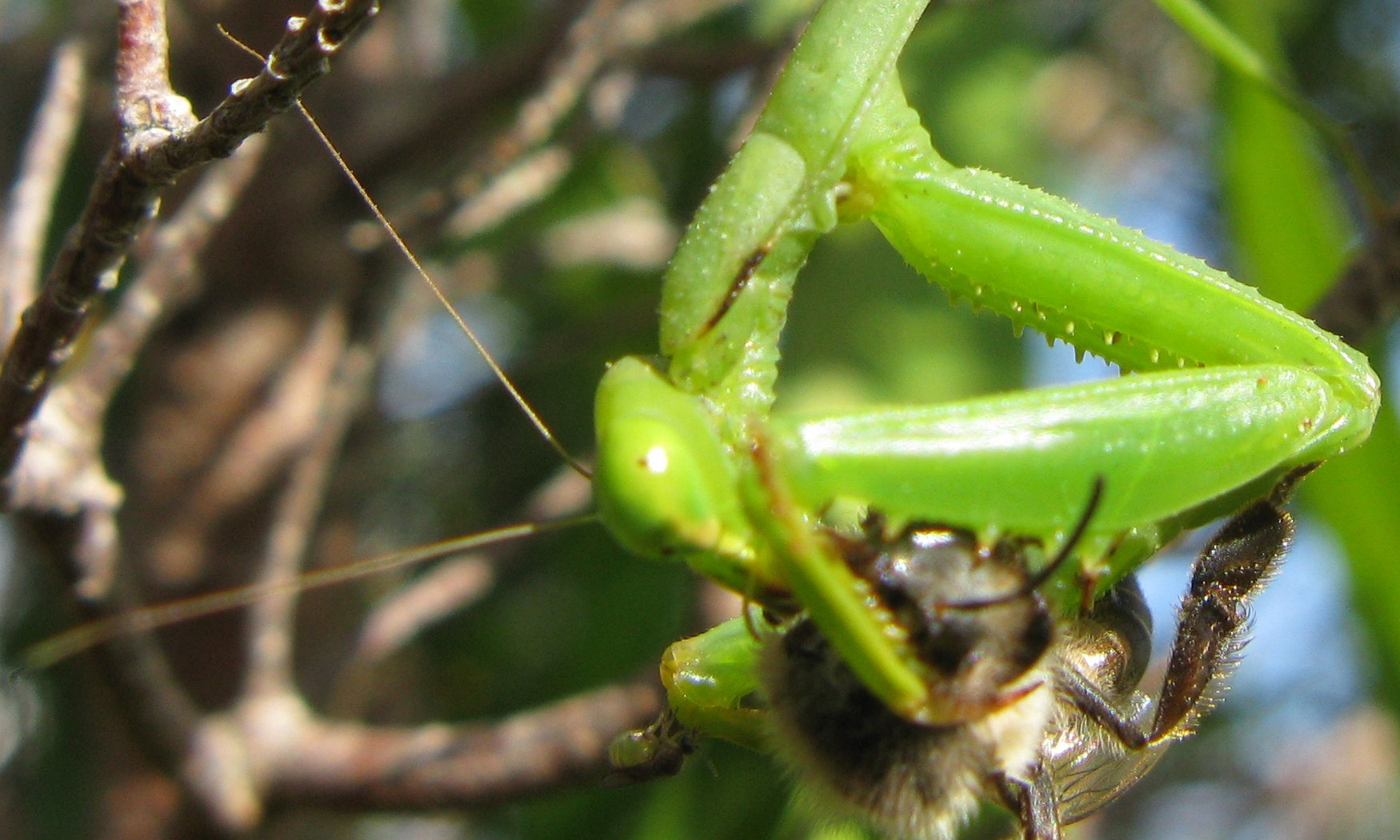
Ceratopogonid feeds on a mantis (The midge is on the front right femorotibial joint of the mantis, which itself is eating a bee)

A Forcipomyia sp. sucks hemolymph from Nemophora metallica

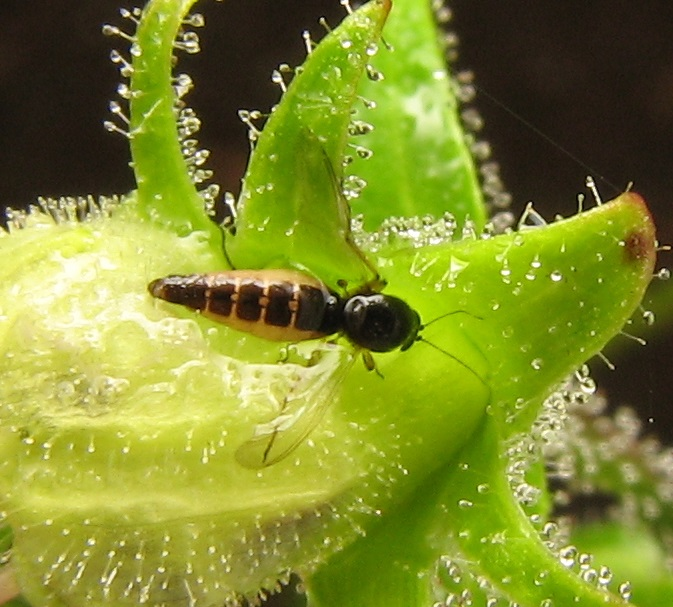
Palpomyiini caught by sticky hairs of penstemon
