= List of Stilobezzia species =

This is a list of 324 species in Stilobezzia, a genus of predaceous midges in the family Ceratopogonidae.

== Stilobezzia species ==
- "Stilobezzia acanthohelea" Da Silva, Ferreira-Keppler & Cazorla, 2023^{c g}
- Stilobezzia acrotrichis Tokunaga, 1959^{c g}
- Stilobezzia addita Clastrier, 1986^{c g}
- Stilobezzia afra Clastrier, 1991^{c g}
- Stilobezzia africana (Ingram & Macfie, 1921)^{c}
- Stilobezzia afrotropica Clastrier, 1991^{c g}
- Stilobezzia alba Tokunaga, 1940^{c g}
- Stilobezzia albiabdominalis Tokunaga & Murachi, 1959^{c g}
- Stilobezzia albicoxa Lane & Forattini, 1956^{c g}
- Stilobezzia albocincta Kieffer, 1917^{c g}
- Stilobezzia amaniensis Meillon, 1980^{c g}
- Stilobezzia amazonica Clastrier, 1991^{c g}
- Stilobezzia americana Kieffer, 1917^{c g}
- Stilobezzia amnigena (Macfie, 1935)^{c g}
- Stilobezzia amplistyla Clastrier, 1989^{c g}
- Stilobezzia angustipennis Clastrier, 1991^{c g}
- Stilobezzia antennalis (Coquillett, 1901)^{i c g b}
- Stilobezzia antipodalis Ingram & Macfie, 1931^{c g}
- Stilobezzia areolaris (Kieffer, 1911)^{c g}
- Stilobezzia armatibiae Tokunaga, 1963^{c g}
- Stilobezzia artistyla Gupta & Wirth, 1968^{c g}
- Stilobezzia atrichopogon Lane & Forattini, 1956^{c g}
- Stilobezzia atronitens Goetghebuer, 1933^{c g}
- Stilobezzia aureola Clastrier, 1963^{c g}
- Stilobezzia badia Macfie, 1932^{c g}
- Stilobezzia baojia Liu & Shi, 2002^{c g}
- Stilobezzia basizonata Tokunaga, 1963^{c g}
- Stilobezzia bata Meillon & Hardy, 1954^{c g}
- Stilobezzia beckae Wirth, 1953^{i c g b}
- Stilobezzia biangulata Tokunaga, 1963^{c g}
- Stilobezzia bicinctipes Ingram & Macfie, 1931^{c g}
- Stilobezzia bicolor Lane, 1947^{i c g}
- Stilobezzia bifurcata Tokunaga, 1959^{c g}
- Stilobezzia bimacula (Kieffer, 1910)^{c g}
- Stilobezzia bimaculata Lane & Forattini, 1956^{c g}
- Stilobezzia bispinosa Kieffer, 1917^{c g}
- Stilobezzia bizonata Tokunaga, 1963^{c g}
- Stilobezzia blantoni Lane & Forattini, 1956^{c g}
- Stilobezzia brandti Tokunaga, 1963^{c g}
- Stilobezzia brevicornis Clastrier, 1991^{c g}
- Stilobezzia brevicostalis Gupta & Wirth, 1968^{c g}
- Stilobezzia brevistyla Clastrier, 1989^{c g}
- Stilobezzia browni Wirth & Giles, 1990^{c g}
- Stilobezzia bulla Thomsen, 1935^{i c g}
- Stilobezzia calcaris Tokunaga & Murachi, 1959^{c g}
- Stilobezzia carayoni Clastrier, 1986^{c g}
- Stilobezzia caribe Lane & Forattini, 1958^{c g}
- Stilobezzia castanea Macfie, 1934^{c g}
- Stilobezzia centripictura Tokunaga, 1963^{c g}
- Stilobezzia cereola Clastrier, 1963^{c g}
- Stilobezzia chaconi Macfie, 1938^{c g}
- Stilobezzia challieri Vattier & Adam, 1966^{c g}
- Stilobezzia chasteli Clastrier, 1967^{c g}
- Stilobezzia chlorosa Clastrier, 1986^{c g}
- Stilobezzia clarifemorata Gupta & Wirth, 1968^{c g}
- Stilobezzia claripennis Clastrier & Wirth, 1958^{c g}
- Stilobezzia claripes Gupta & Wirth, 1968^{c g}
- Stilobezzia clavicula Tokunaga, 1963^{c g}
- Stilobezzia collessi Wirth & Grogan, 1988^{c g}
- Stilobezzia congestiterga Gupta & Wirth, 1968^{c g}
- Stilobezzia contans Gupta & Wirth, 1968^{c g}
- Stilobezzia coquilletti Kieffer, 1917^{i c g b}
- Stilobezzia coracina Kieffer, 1917^{c g}
- Stilobezzia corneti Clastrier, 1991^{c g}
- Stilobezzia crassiforceps Tokunaga, 1963^{c g}
- Stilobezzia crassipes Kieffer, 1918^{c g}
- Stilobezzia crassistyla Gupta & Wirth, 1968^{c g}
- Stilobezzia crassivenosa Gupta & Wirth, 1968^{c g}
- Stilobezzia crossi Meillon & Wirth, 1981^{c g}
- Stilobezzia curvistyla Cazorla & Spinelli, 2006^{c g}
- Stilobezzia debilipes Gupta & Wirth, 1968^{c g}
- Stilobezzia decora Kieffer, 1916^{c g}
- Stilobezzia differens Meillon, 1960^{c g}
- Stilobezzia diminuta Lane & Forattini, 1958^{c g}
- Stilobezzia distinctifasciata Gupta & Wirth, 1968^{c g}
- Stilobezzia diversa (Coquillett, 1901)^{i c g}
- Stilobezzia djalonensis Clastrier, 1991^{c g}
- Stilobezzia donskoffi Clastrier, 1988^{c g}
- Stilobezzia dorsofasciata (Lutz, 1914)^{c g}
- Stilobezzia dorsosignata Sinha, Dasgupta & Chaudhuri, 2003^{c g}
- Stilobezzia douryi Clastrier, 1963^{c g}
- Stilobezzia dryadum Macfie, 1940^{c g}
- Stilobezzia dubitans Lane, Forattini & Rabello, 1955^{c g}
- Stilobezzia dureti Lane & Forattini, 1958^{c g}
- Stilobezzia dycei Wirth & Grogan, 1988^{c g}
- Stilobezzia edwardsi Ingram & Macfie, 1931^{c g}
- Stilobezzia elegantula (Johannsen, 1907)^{i c g}
- Stilobezzia eliptaminensis Tokunaga, 1963^{c g}
- Stilobezzia ensistyla Chaudhuri, Guha & Gupta, 1981^{c g}
- Stilobezzia erectiseta Liu, Ge & Liu, 1996^{c g}
- Stilobezzia esmeralda Lane & Forattini, 1958^{c g}
- Stilobezzia eximitarsis Gupta & Wirth, 1968^{c g}
- Stilobezzia fasciscutata Gupta & Wirth, 1968^{c g}
- Stilobezzia femoralis Lane & Forattini, 1956^{c g}
- Stilobezzia festiva Kieffer, 1911^{c g}
- Stilobezzia fiebrigi Kieffer, 1917^{c g}
- Stilobezzia fitzroyensis Lee, 1948^{c g}
- Stilobezzia flavida Meillon & Wirth, 1987^{c g}
- Stilobezzia flavipectoralis Remm, 1993^{c g}
- Stilobezzia flavirostris Winnertz, 1852^{c g}
- Stilobezzia flavizonata Tokunaga, 1963^{c g}
- Stilobezzia fortipes Gupta & Wirth, 1968^{c g}
- Stilobezzia fortistyla Gupta & Wirth, 1968^{c g}
- Stilobezzia foyi (Ingram & Macfie, 1921)^{c g}
- Stilobezzia fulva Meillon & Downes, 1986^{c g}
- Stilobezzia fulvacea Remm, 1980^{c g}
- Stilobezzia fulviscuta Tokunaga & Murachi, 1959^{c g}
- Stilobezzia furcellata Remm, 1980^{c g}
- Stilobezzia furcipes Meillon, 1960^{c g}
- Stilobezzia furva Ingram & Macfie, 1931^{c g}
- Stilobezzia fuscidorsum Kieffer, 1921^{c g}
- Stilobezzia fuscigenua Tokunaga & Murachi, 1959^{c g}
- Stilobezzia fuscipes Gupta & Wirth, 1968^{c g}
- Stilobezzia fusciscutellata Tokunaga & Murachi, 1959^{c g}
- Stilobezzia fusciterga Gupta & Wirth, 1968^{c g}
- Stilobezzia fuscula Wirth, 1952^{i c g}
- Stilobezzia fusistylata Tokunaga & Murachi, 1959^{c g}
- Stilobezzia gallica Clastrier, 1991^{c g}
- Stilobezzia gambiae Clastrier & Wirth, 1961^{c g}
- Stilobezzia genitalis Lee, 1948^{c g}
- Stilobezzia gigantiforceps Clastrier, 1989^{c g}
- Stilobezzia glauca Macfie, 1939^{i c g}
- Stilobezzia gracilis (Haliday, 1833)^{c g}
- Stilobezzia grandis Lane & Forattini, 1958^{c g}
- Stilobezzia gressitti Tokunaga & Murachi, 1959^{c g}
- Stilobezzia guarani ^{g}
- Stilobezzia guianae (Macfie, 1940)^{c}
- Stilobezzia harurii Boorman & Harten, 2002^{c g}
- Stilobezzia hirsuta Ingram & Macfie, 1931^{c g}
- Stilobezzia hirta Borkent, 1997^{c g}
- Stilobezzia hirtaterga Yu, 1989^{c g}
- Stilobezzia hollandia Tokunaga, 1959^{c g}
- Stilobezzia huberti Gupta & Wirth, 1968^{c g}
- Stilobezzia immodentis Liu, Ge & Liu, 1996^{c g}
- Stilobezzia imparungulae Gupta & Wirth, 1968^{c g}
- Stilobezzia inermipes Kieffer, 1912^{c g}
- Stilobezzia inkisiensis Clastrier, 1986^{c g}
- Stilobezzia insigniforceps Clastrier, 1989^{c g}
- Stilobezzia insolita Gupta & Wirth, 1968^{c g}
- Stilobezzia intermedia Meillon, 1939^{c g}
- Stilobezzia isthmostheca Gupta & Wirth, 1968^{c g}
- Stilobezzia kiefferi Lane, 1947^{i c g}
- Stilobezzia kindiae Clastrier, 1991^{c g}
- Stilobezzia kisantuensis Clastrier, 1986^{c g}
- Stilobezzia kunashiri Remm, 1993^{c g}
- Stilobezzia kurthi Borkent, 2000^{c g}
- Stilobezzia lanceloti Macfie, 1937^{c g}
- Stilobezzia lasioterga Gupta & Wirth, 1968^{c g}
- Stilobezzia lateralis (Meigen, 1838)^{c}
- Stilobezzia latiforceps Tokunaga, 1959^{c g}
- Stilobezzia latistyla Clastrier, 1989^{c g}
- Stilobezzia latiunguis Clastrier, 1985^{c g}
- Stilobezzia leucopeza Clastrier, 1958^{c g}
- Stilobezzia limai Wirth & Derron, 1976^{c g}
- Stilobezzia limnophila Ingram & Macfie, 1922^{c g}
- Stilobezzia longicornis Goetghebuer, 1934^{c g}
- Stilobezzia longiforceps Clastrier, 1960^{c g}
- Stilobezzia longihamata Tokunaga, 1963^{c g}
- Stilobezzia longiradix ^{g}
- Stilobezzia longistyla Tokunaga, 1941^{c g}
- Stilobezzia lutacea Edwards, 1926^{c g}
- Stilobezzia lutea (Malloch, 1918)^{i c g}
- Stilobezzia luteola Meillon, 1940^{c g}
- Stilobezzia maai Tokunaga, 1963^{c g}
- Stilobezzia macclurei Gupta & Wirth, 1968^{c g}
- Stilobezzia macfiei Lane, 1947^{c g}
- Stilobezzia maculata Lane, 1947^{c g}
- Stilobezzia maculipes Macfie, 1933^{c g}
- Stilobezzia maculitibia Lane & Forattini, 1956^{c g}
- Stilobezzia magnitheca Gupta & Wirth, 1968^{c g}
- Stilobezzia mahensis Clastrier, 1983^{c g}
- Stilobezzia maia Lane & Forattini, 1958^{c g}
- Stilobezzia manaosensis Lane & Forattini, 1958^{c g}
- Stilobezzia merceri Cazorla, 2005^{c g}
- Stilobezzia minima Kieffer, 1918^{c g}
- Stilobezzia minuta Gupta & Wirth, 1968^{c g}
- Stilobezzia miripes Gupta & Wirth, 1968^{c g}
- Stilobezzia modesta Lane, 1947^{c g}
- Stilobezzia monopicta ^{g}
- Stilobezzia monticola Tokunaga, 1940^{c g}
- Stilobezzia mutabilis Clastrier, 1986^{c g}
- Stilobezzia nasticae Meillon, 1959^{c g}
- Stilobezzia natalensis Meillon, 1939^{c g}
- Stilobezzia navaiae Wirth and Grogan, 1981^{i c g}
- Stilobezzia nebulosa Tokunaga, 1963^{c g}
- Stilobezzia nigerrima Ingram & Macfie, 1931^{c g}
- Stilobezzia nigriapicalis Tokunaga, 1963^{c g}
- Stilobezzia nigroflava Lane & Forattini, 1958^{c g}
- Stilobezzia nitela Yu, 2005^{c g}
- Stilobezzia niveus Liu, Ge & Liu, 1996^{c g}
- Stilobezzia notata (de Meijere, 1907)^{c g}
- Stilobezzia nudisthmostheca Gupta & Wirth, 1968^{c g}
- Stilobezzia nyei Clastrier, 1983^{c g}
- Stilobezzia obesa Gupta & Wirth, 1968^{c g}
- Stilobezzia obesigenitalis Gupta & Wirth, 1968^{c g}
- Stilobezzia obscura Lane & Forattini, 1958^{c g}
- Stilobezzia ochracea (Winnertz, 1852)^{c}
- Stilobezzia ohakunei Ingram & Macfie, 1931^{c g}
- Stilobezzia orientis Meillon & Wirth, 1981^{c g}
- Stilobezzia ornata Lane & Forattini, 1958^{c g}
- Stilobezzia ornaticrus Ingram & Macfie, 1931^{c g}
- Stilobezzia ornatithorax Clastrier, 1991^{c g}
- Stilobezzia oxiana Remm, 1980^{c g}
- Stilobezzia pallescens Lane & Forattini, 1958^{c g}
- Stilobezzia pallidicornis Tokunaga & Murachi, 1959^{c g}
- Stilobezzia pallidipes Clastrier, 1983^{c g}
- Stilobezzia pallidiventris (Malloch, 1915)^{i c g}
- Stilobezzia palpalis Tokunaga, 1963^{c g}
- Stilobezzia panamensis Lane & Forattini, 1958^{c g}
- Stilobezzia papillata Remm, 1980^{c g}
- Stilobezzia papuae Tokunaga, 1963^{c g}
- Stilobezzia paranaense ^{g}
- Stilobezzia parvaeungulae Gupta & Wirth, 1968^{c g}
- Stilobezzia parvitheca Gupta & Wirth, 1968^{c g}
- Stilobezzia parvula Goetghebuer, 1933^{c g}
- Stilobezzia pastoriana Clastrier, 1986^{c g}
- Stilobezzia patagonica Ingram & Macfie, 1931^{c g}
- Stilobezzia paucimaculata Clastrier, 1984^{c g}
- Stilobezzia paucipictipes Gupta & Wirth, 1968^{c g}
- Stilobezzia pauliani Meillon, 1961^{c g}
- Stilobezzia paulistensis Lane, 1947^{c g}
- Stilobezzia perspicua Johannsen, 1931^{c g}
- Stilobezzia pessoni (Neveu, 1977)^{c g}
- Stilobezzia photophila Clastrier, 1984^{c g}
- Stilobezzia pictipes Kieffer, 1917^{c g}
- Stilobezzia poikiloptera (Ingram & Macfie, 1922)^{c g}
- Stilobezzia postcervix Tokunaga, 1959^{c g}
- Stilobezzia propristyla Gupta & Wirth, 1968^{c g}
- Stilobezzia proxima Cazorla & Felippe-Bauer, 2017^{g}
- Stilobezzia pruinosa Wirth, 1952^{i c}
- Stilobezzia pseudofestiva Gupta & Wirth, 1968^{c g}
- Stilobezzia pseudonotata Gupta & Wirth, 1968^{c g}
- Stilobezzia punctifemorata Gupta & Wirth, 1968^{c g}
- Stilobezzia punctulata Lane, 1947^{c g}
- Stilobezzia quadrisetosa (Goetghebuer, 1933)^{c g}
- Stilobezzia quasielegantula Cazorla & Felippe-Bauer, 2017^{g}
- Stilobezzia quatei Gupta & Wirth, 1968^{c g}
- Stilobezzia rabelloi Lane, 1947^{i c g}
- Stilobezzia rava Ingram & Macfie, 1931^{c g}
- Stilobezzia reflexa Tokunaga, 1963^{c g}
- Stilobezzia robusta Gupta & Wirth, 1968^{c g}
- Stilobezzia rotunditheca Gupta & Wirth, 1968^{c g}
- Stilobezzia rufa Kieffer, 1921^{c g}
- Stilobezzia rutshuruensis Clastrier, 1986^{c g}
- Stilobezzia sahariensis Kieffer, 1923^{c g}
- Stilobezzia samoana Edwards, 1928^{c g}
- Stilobezzia sanctibernardini Kieffer, 1917^{c g}
- Stilobezzia scutata Lane & Forattini, 1961^{c g}
- Stilobezzia seguyi Clastrier, 1990^{c g}
- Stilobezzia semiartistyla Sinha, Dasgupta & Chaudhuri, 2003^{c g}
- Stilobezzia setigera Tokunaga, 1959^{c g}
- Stilobezzia setigeripes Tokunaga, 1963^{c g}
- Stilobezzia setigeriscutellata Tokunaga & Murachi, 1959^{c g}
- Stilobezzia seychelleana Clastrier, 1983^{c g}
- Stilobezzia silvicola Macfie, 1940^{c g}
- Stilobezzia similans Lane & Forattini, 1956^{c g}
- Stilobezzia similisegmenta Tokunaga, 1959^{c g}
- Stilobezzia simplex Lane & Forattini, 1958^{c g}
- Stilobezzia simulator Meillon, 1960^{c g}
- Stilobezzia singularis Clastrier, 1985^{c g}
- Stilobezzia soror Johannsen, 1931^{c g}
- Stilobezzia spadicicoxalis Tokunaga & Murachi, 1959^{c g}
- Stilobezzia spadicitibialis Tokunaga & Murachi, 1959^{c g}
- Stilobezzia speculae Macfie, 1934^{c g}
- Stilobezzia spinellii Huerta & Grogan, 2017^{g}
- Stilobezzia spinifemorata Tokunaga, 1963^{c g}
- Stilobezzia spinipes Gupta & Wirth, 1968^{c g}
- Stilobezzia spinitarsis Gupta & Wirth, 1968^{c g}
- Stilobezzia spiniterga Gupta & Wirth, 1968^{c g}
- Stilobezzia spirogyrae Carter, Ingram & Macfie, 1921^{c g}
- "Stilobezzia stilobezzia" Da Silva, Ferreira-Keppler & Cazorla, 2023^{c g}
- Stilobezzia stonei Wirth, 1953^{i c g}
- Stilobezzia subalba Gupta & Wirth, 1968^{c g}
- Stilobezzia subfestiva Gupta & Wirth, 1968^{c g}
- Stilobezzia subflava Gupta & Wirth, 1968^{c g}
- Stilobezzia subnebulosa Gupta & Wirth, 1968^{c g}
- Stilobezzia subsessilis Kieffer, 1917^{c g}
- Stilobezzia subsoror Tokunaga, 1941^{c g}
- Stilobezzia subviridis Macfie, 1934^{c g}
- Stilobezzia succinea Ingram & Macfie, 1931^{c g}
- Stilobezzia supernotata Gupta & Wirth, 1968^{c g}
- Stilobezzia sybleae Wirth, 1953^{i c g b}
- Stilobezzia szadziewskii Chaudhuri, 1991^{c g}
- Stilobezzia tarsispinosa ^{g}
- Stilobezzia tasmaniensis Lee, 1948^{c g}
- Stilobezzia tauffliebi Meillon, 1959^{c g}
- Stilobezzia tenebrosa Macfie, 1933^{c g}
- Stilobezzia tenuicolorata Gupta & Wirth, 1968^{c g}
- Stilobezzia tenuiforceps Tokunaga & Murachi, 1959^{c g}
- Stilobezzia tetragona Goetghebuer, 1934^{c g}
- Stilobezzia thibaulti (Neveu, 1977)^{c g}
- Stilobezzia thomasi Grogan, Spinelli, Ronderos & Cazorla, 2013^{g}
- Stilobezzia thomsenae Wirth, 1953^{i c g}
- Stilobezzia thyridofera Tokunaga, 1959^{c g}
- Stilobezzia tibialis Lane & Forattini, 1956^{c g}
- Stilobezzia tomensis Wirth & Derron, 1976^{c g}
- Stilobezzia tonnoiri Macfie, 1932^{c g}
- Stilobezzia transversa Lane & Forattini, 1958^{c g}
- Stilobezzia traubi Gupta & Wirth, 1968^{c g}
- Stilobezzia travassosi Lane, 1947^{c g}
- Stilobezzia trilineata Meillon & Wirth, 1983^{c g}
- Stilobezzia trimaculata Meillon & Wirth, 1987^{c g}
- Stilobezzia tropica Clastrier, 1958^{c g}
- Stilobezzia truncata Tokunaga, 1959^{c g}
- Stilobezzia ugandae Ingram & Macfie, 1923^{c g}
- Stilobezzia unicellula Clastrier, 1985^{c g}
- Stilobezzia unifasciata Tokunaga, 1963^{c g}
- Stilobezzia unifascidorsalis Tokunaga, 1959^{c g}
- Stilobezzia vandeli Vattier & Adam, 1966^{c g}
- Stilobezzia varia Ingram & Macfie, 1931^{c g}
- Stilobezzia venefica Gupta & Wirth, 1968^{c g}
- Stilobezzia venezuelensis Ortiz, 1950^{c g}
- Stilobezzia versicolor (Ingram & Macfie, 1921)^{c}
- Stilobezzia virescens Kieffer, 1919^{c g}
- Stilobezzia viridis (Coquillett, 1901)^{i c g b}
- Stilobezzia viridiventris (Kieffer, 1910)^{c g}
- Stilobezzia vittata Clastrier, 1960^{c g}
- Stilobezzia vittula Tokunaga, 1963^{c g}
- Stilobezzia vulgaris Yu, 1989^{c g}
- Stilobezzia williamsi Cazorla, 2005^{c g}
- Stilobezzia wirthi Lane & Forattini, 1956^{c g}
- Stilobezzia wygodzinskyi Lane, 1947^{c g}
- Stilobezzia xanthogaster Gupta & Wirth, 1968^{c g}
- Stilobezzia xerophila ^{g}
- Stilobezzia zonata Tokunaga, 1963^{c g}

Data sources: i = ITIS, c = Catalogue of Life, g = GBIF, b = Bugguide.net
