= List of Alluaudomyia species =

This is a list of 182 species in Alluaudomyia, a genus of predaceous midges in the family Ceratopogonidae.

== Alluaudomyia species ==
- Alluaudomyia abdominalis Wirth & Delfinado, 1964^{c g}
- Alluaudomyia abonnenci Clastrier, 1958^{c g}
- Alluaudomyia adunca Wirth & Delfinado, 1964^{c g}
- Alluaudomyia albigena Wirth & Delfinado, 1964^{c g}
- Alluaudomyia albopicta (Ingram & Macfie, 1922)^{c}
- Alluaudomyia alpina Debenham, 1971^{c g}
- Alluaudomyia altalocei Delecolle & Rieb, 1989^{c g}
- Alluaudomyia amazonica Spinelli & Wirth, 1984^{c g}
- Alluaudomyia angulata Wirth & Delfinado, 1964^{c g}
- Alluaudomyia annulata Wirth & Delfinado, 1964^{c g}
- Alluaudomyia annulipes Wirth & Delfinado, 1964^{c g}
- Alluaudomyia anserina Meillon & Wirth, 1983^{c g}
- Alluaudomyia appendiculata Debenham, 1971^{c g}
- Alluaudomyia astera Tokunaga, 1963^{c g}
- Alluaudomyia aterrivena Tokunaga, 1940^{c g}
- Alluaudomyia australiensis Debenham, 1971^{c g}
- Alluaudomyia bella (Coquillett, 1902)^{i c g}
- Alluaudomyia bertrandi Harant & Cellier, 1949^{c g}
- Alluaudomyia bicornis Debenham, 1971^{c g}
- Alluaudomyia biestroi Spinelli, 1988^{c g}
- Alluaudomyia bifasciata Tokunaga, 1963^{c g}
- Alluaudomyia bifurcata Wirth & Delfinado, 1964^{c g}
- Alluaudomyia bimaculata Clastrier & Wirth, 1961^{c g}
- Alluaudomyia bipunctata Tokunaga & Murachi, 1959^{c g}
- Alluaudomyia bispinula Zhang, Xue, Deng & Yu, 2004^{c g}
- Alluaudomyia bohemiae Boorman, 1997^{c g}
- Alluaudomyia boucheti Clastrier, 1985^{c g}
- Alluaudomyia brandti Tokunaga, 1963^{c g}
- Alluaudomyia brevicosta Clastrier, 1960^{c g}
- Alluaudomyia brevis Wirth & Delfinado, 1964^{c g}
- Alluaudomyia candidata Yu, 1999^{c g}
- Alluaudomyia caribbeana Spinelli and Wirth, 1984^{i c g}
- Alluaudomyia catarinenis Spinelli & Wirth, 1984^{c g}
- Alluaudomyia claudia Meillon, 1942^{c g}
- Alluaudomyia cobra Meillon & Wirth, 1987^{c g}
- Alluaudomyia columinis Liu, Ge & Liu, 1996^{c g}
- Alluaudomyia congolensis Meillon, 1939^{c g}
- Alluaudomyia conjucta (Kieffer, 1918)^{c g}
- Alluaudomyia debilipenis Sinha, Mazumdar & Chaudhuri, 2005^{c g}
- Alluaudomyia dekeyseri Clastrier, 1958^{c g}
- Alluaudomyia delfinadoae Giles & Wirth, 1984^{c g}
- Alluaudomyia demeilloni Clastrier & Wirth, 1961^{c g}
- Alluaudomyia depuncta Remm, 1980^{c g}
- Alluaudomyia distispinulosa Spinelli & Wirth, 1984^{c g}
- Alluaudomyia epsteini Giles & Wirth, 1987^{c g}
- Alluaudomyia estevezae Spinelli & Wirth, 1984^{c g}
- Alluaudomyia exigua Clastrier, 1985^{c g}
- Alluaudomyia falcata Meillon & Wirth, 1983^{c g}
- Alluaudomyia fimbriatinervis Clastrier, 1958^{c g}
- Alluaudomyia finitima Sinha, Mazumdar & Chaudhuri, 2005^{c g}
- Alluaudomyia fittkaui Spinelli & Wirth, 1984^{c g}
- Alluaudomyia flexistyla Chaudhuri & Ghosh, 1981^{c g}
- Alluaudomyia footei Wirth, 1952^{i c g}
- Alluaudomyia formosana Okada, 1942^{c g}
- Alluaudomyia fragilicornis Clastrier, 1958^{c g}
- Alluaudomyia fragmentum Debenham, 1971^{c g}
- Alluaudomyia fumosipennis Debenham, 1971^{c g}
- Alluaudomyia fuscipennis Wirth & Delfinado, 1964^{c g}
- Alluaudomyia fuscipes Wirth & Delfinado, 1964^{c g}
- Alluaudomyia fuscitarsis Chaudhuri, Guha & Gupta, 1981^{c g}
- Alluaudomyia gloriosa Kieffer, 1925^{c g}
- Alluaudomyia griffithi Wirth & Delfinado, 1964^{c g}
- Alluaudomyia guarani Spinelli, 1988^{c g}
- Alluaudomyia halterata Remm, 1993^{c g}
- Alluaudomyia hirsutipennis Clastrier, 1960^{c g}
- Alluaudomyia huberti Wirth & Delfinado, 1964^{c g}
- Alluaudomyia hygropetrica Vaillant, 1954^{c g}
- Alluaudomyia immaculata Tokunaga, 1963^{c g}
- Alluaudomyia imparungius Kieffer, 1913^{c g}
- Alluaudomyia imperfecta (Goetghebuer, 1935)^{c g}
- Alluaudomyia inaequalis Wirth & Delfinado, 1964^{c g}
- Alluaudomyia inexspectata Clastrier, 1983^{c g}
- Alluaudomyia infuscata Wirth & Delfinado, 1964^{c g}
- Alluaudomyia insulana Tokunaga & Murachi, 1959^{c g}
- Alluaudomyia insulicola Tokunaga & Murachi, 1959^{c g}
- Alluaudomyia jimmensis Tokunaga, 1963^{c g}
- Alluaudomyia lactella Remm, 1980^{c g}
- Alluaudomyia latipennis (Skuse, 1889)^{c g}
- Alluaudomyia leei Spinelli & Wirth, 1984^{c g}
- Alluaudomyia limosa Clastrier, 1961^{g}
- Alluaudomyia linosa Clastrier, 1961^{c g}
- Alluaudomyia ljatifeidae Remm, 1967^{c g}
- Alluaudomyia louisi Meillon & Wirth, 1981^{c g}
- Alluaudomyia lunata Meillon & Wirth, 1983^{c g}
- Alluaudomyia macclurei Wirth & Delfinado, 1964^{c g}
- Alluaudomyia maculata (Clastrier, 1960)^{c g}
- Alluaudomyia maculipennis (Carter, Ingram & Macfie, 1921)^{c g}
- Alluaudomyia maculithorax (Carter, Ingram & Macfie, 1921)^{c g}
- Alluaudomyia maculosa Meillon, 1936^{c g}
- Alluaudomyia maculosipennis Tokunaga, 1940^{c g}
- Alluaudomyia maculosissima Wirth & Delfinado, 1964^{c g}
- Alluaudomyia magna Wirth & Delfinado, 1964^{c g}
- Alluaudomyia magoebai Meillon, Meiswinkel & Wirth, 1982^{c g}
- Alluaudomyia marginalis Wirth & Delfinado, 1964^{c g}
- Alluaudomyia marmorata (Carter, Ingram & Macfie, 1921)^{c g}
- Alluaudomyia marmorea Clastrier, 1960^{c g}
- Alluaudomyia mcmillani Clastrier & Wirth, 1961^{c g}
- Alluaudomyia megaparamera Williams, 1957^{i c g}
- Alluaudomyia melanesiae Clastrier, 1985^{c g}
- Alluaudomyia melanosticta (Ingram & Macfie, 1922)^{c g}
- Alluaudomyia meridiana Clastrier, 1978^{c g}
- Alluaudomyia monopunctata Tokunaga & Murachi, 1959^{c g}
- Alluaudomyia monosticta (Ingram & Macfie, 1923)^{c g}
- Alluaudomyia mouensis Giles & Wirth, 1987^{c g}
- Alluaudomyia mynistensis Remm, 1979^{c g}
- Alluaudomyia natalensis Meillon, 1939^{c g}
- Alluaudomyia needhami Thomsen, 1935^{i c g b}
- Alluaudomyia neocaledoniensis Clastrier, 1985^{c g}
- Alluaudomyia nilogenes (Kieffer, 1924)^{c g}
- Alluaudomyia nubeculosa Spinelli & Wirth, 1984^{c g}
- Alluaudomyia ocellata Remm, 1980^{c g}
- Alluaudomyia pacifica Clastrier, 1985^{c g}
- Alluaudomyia papuae Tokunaga, 1963^{c g}
- Alluaudomyia parafurcata Wirth & Delfinado, 1964^{c g}
- Alluaudomyia paraspina Wirth, 1952^{i c g b}
- Alluaudomyia parva Wirth, 1952^{i c g}
- Alluaudomyia pentaspila Remm et Glukhova, 1971^{c g}
- Alluaudomyia personata Debenham, 1971^{c g}
- Alluaudomyia petersi Tokunaga, 1963^{c g}
- Alluaudomyia platipyga Tokunaga, 1963^{c g}
- Alluaudomyia plaumanni Spinelli & Wirth, 1984^{c g}
- Alluaudomyia poeyi (Garrett, 1925)^{i}
- Alluaudomyia poguei Giles & Wirth, 1987^{c g}
- Alluaudomyia polyommata Macfie, 1947^{c g}
- Alluaudomyia prima Clastrier, 1976^{g}
- Alluaudomyia pseudomaculipennis (Carter, Ingram & Macfie, 1921)^{c g}
- Alluaudomyia pseudomaculithorax Clastrier, 1958^{c g}
- Alluaudomyia pseudomarginalis Wirth & Delfinado, 1964^{c g}
- Alluaudomyia punctivenosa Wirth & Grogan, 1988^{c g}
- Alluaudomyia punctulata Wirth & Delfinado, 1964^{c g}
- Alluaudomyia puntiradialis Spinelli & Wirth, 1984^{c g}
- Alluaudomyia quadripunctata (Goetghebuer, 1934)^{c g}
- Alluaudomyia quasivuda Stam, 1964^{c g}
- Alluaudomyia quinquenebulosa Wirth & Delfinado, 1964^{c g}
- Alluaudomyia quinquepunctata Tokunaga, 1940^{c g}
- Alluaudomyia remmi Szadziewski, 1983^{c g}
- Alluaudomyia reyei Debenham, 1971^{c g}
- Alluaudomyia riparia Clastrier, 1978^{c g}
- Alluaudomyia rostrata Zhang, Xue, Deng & Yu, 2004^{c g}
- Alluaudomyia rudolfi Meillon & Downes, 1986^{c g}
- Alluaudomyia sagaensis Tokunaga, 1940^{c g}
- Alluaudomyia schnacki Spinelli, 1983^{c g}
- Alluaudomyia senta Meillon, 1936^{c g}
- Alluaudomyia sexpunctata Spinelli & Wirth, 1984^{c g}
- Alluaudomyia shogakii Tokunaga, 1960^{c g}
- Alluaudomyia siebenschwabi Havelka, 1983^{c g}
- Alluaudomyia similiforceps Clastrier, 1960^{c g}
- Alluaudomyia simulata Sinha, Mazumdar & Chaudhuri, 2005^{c g}
- Alluaudomyia smeei Tokunaga, 1963^{c g}
- Alluaudomyia sophiae Stam, 1964^{c g}
- Alluaudomyia sordidipennis Clastrier & Wirth, 1961^{c g}
- Alluaudomyia soutini Meillon & Wirth, 1983^{c g}
- Alluaudomyia spinellii Wirth & Grogan, 1988^{c g}
- Alluaudomyia spinosipes Tokunaga, 1962^{c g}
- Alluaudomyia splendentis Liu, Ge & Liu, 1996^{c g}
- Alluaudomyia splendida (Winnertz, 1852)^{c g}
- Alluaudomyia sternalis Wirth & Delfinado, 1964^{c g}
- Alluaudomyia stictipennis Wirth, 1952^{i c g}
- Alluaudomyia streptomera Remm, 1980^{c g}
- Alluaudomyia striata Remm, 1993^{c g}
- Alluaudomyia subannulata Wirth & Delfinado, 1964^{c g}
- Alluaudomyia tauffiebi Clastrier, 1960^{c g}
- Alluaudomyia tenuiannulata Spinelli & Wirth, 1984^{c g}
- Alluaudomyia tenuistylata Tokunaga, 1959^{c g}
- Alluaudomyia thurmanorum Wirth & Delfinado, 1964^{c g}
- Alluaudomyia tiberghieni Neveu, 1978^{c g}
- Alluaudomyia tillierorum Clastrier, 1985^{c g}
- Alluaudomyia tokunagai Wirth & Delfinado, 1964^{c g}
- Alluaudomyia transvaalensis Meillon, 1974^{c g}
- Alluaudomyia tripartita Okada, 1942^{c g}
- Alluaudomyia tripunctata Spinelli & Wirth, 1984^{c g}
- Alluaudomyia undecimpunctata Tokunaga, 1940^{c g}
- Alluaudomyia unguistyla Debenham, 1971^{c g}
- Alluaudomyia varia Debenham, 1971^{c g}
- Alluaudomyia variegata Glick and Mullen, 1982^{i c g}
- Alluaudomyia verecunda Debenham, 1971^{c g}
- Alluaudomyia vicina Clastrier, 1960^{c g}
- Alluaudomyia vudu Meillon & Hardy, 1954^{c g}
- Alluaudomyia wansoni Meillon, 1939^{c g}
- Alluaudomyia wirthi Williams, 1957^{i c g}
- Alluaudomyia xanthocoma (Kieffer, 1913)^{c g}
- Alluaudomyia youngi Spinelli & Wirth, 1984^{c g}

Data sources: i = ITIS, c = Catalogue of Life, g = GBIF, b = Bugguide.net
