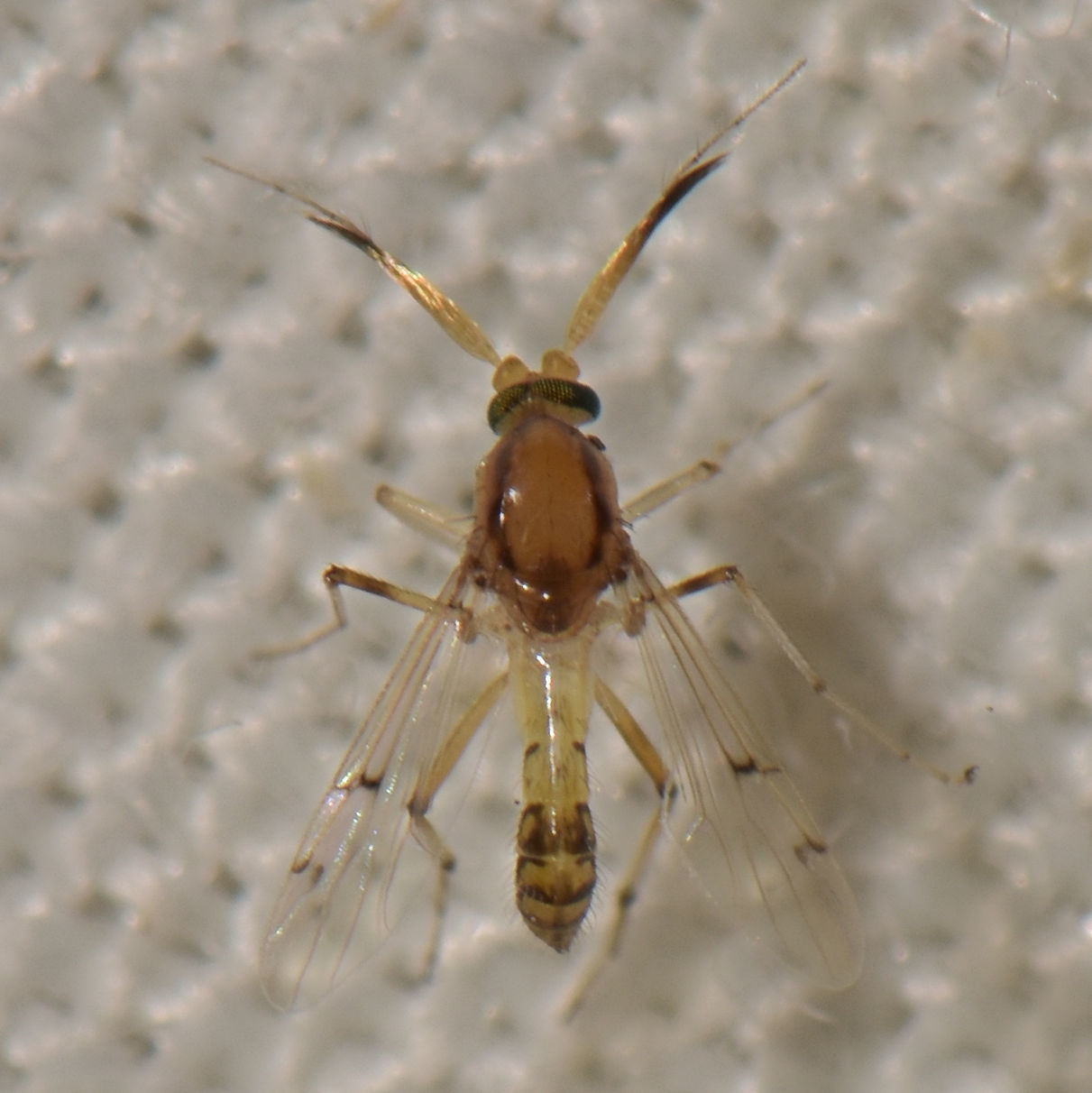
- Stilobezzia coquilletti, male, Canada

Scientific classification
- Domain: Eukaryota
- Kingdom: Animalia
- Phylum: Arthropoda
- Class: Insecta
- Order: Diptera
- Family: Ceratopogonidae
- Tribe: Ceratopogonini
- Genus: Stilobezzia
- Species: S. coquilletti

Binomial name
- Stilobezzia coquilletti Kieffer, 1917

Synonyms
- Ceratopogon pictus Coquillett, 1905

= Stilobezzia coquilletti =

Species of fly

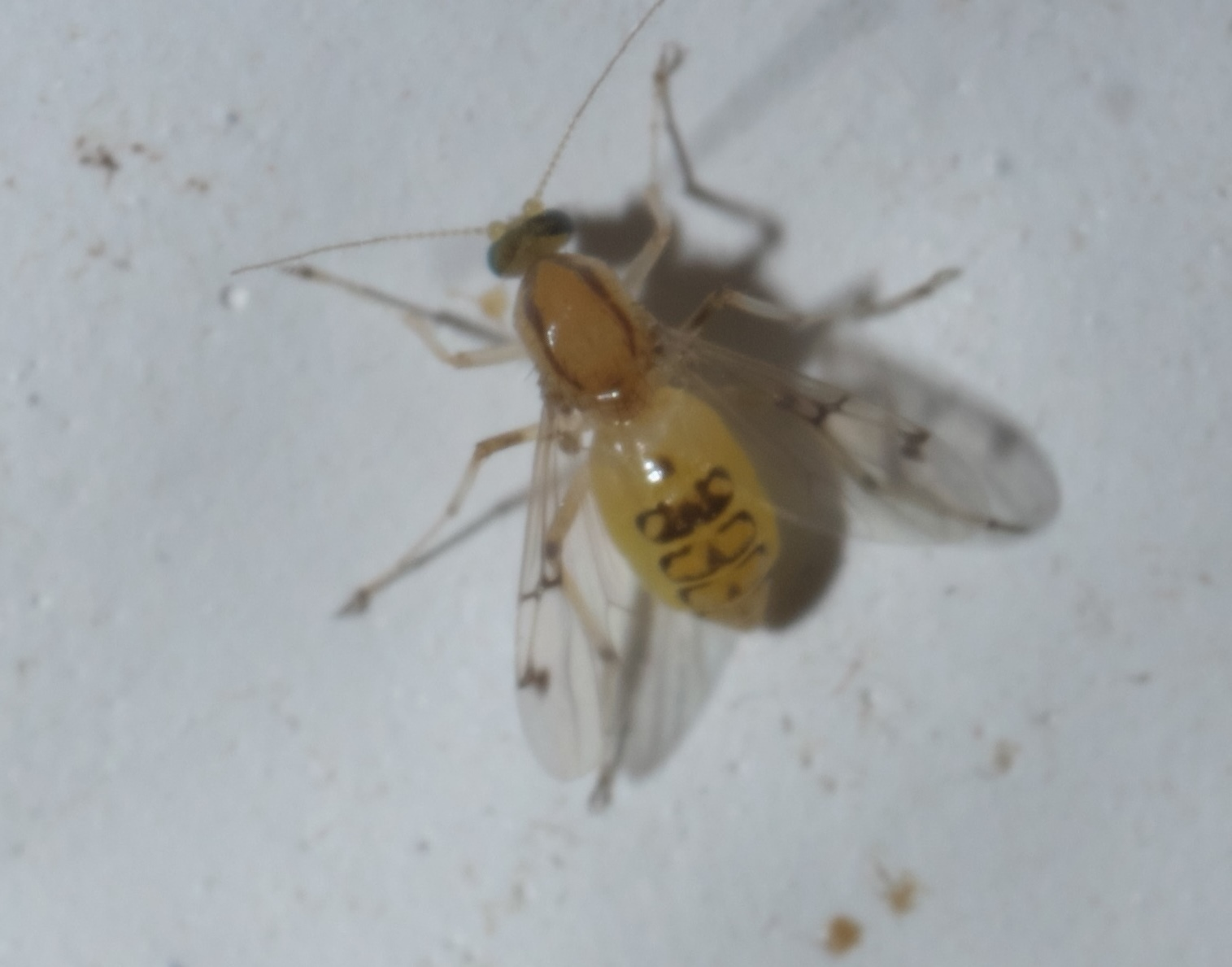
Stilobezzia coquilletti, female, Oklahoma

Stilobezzia coquilletti is a species of predaceous midges in the family Ceratopogonidae.
