= Allohelea johannseni =

Scientific classification
- Domain: Eukaryota
- Kingdom: Animalia
- Phylum: Arthropoda
- Class: Insecta
- Order: Diptera
- Family: Ceratopogonidae
- Tribe: Ceratopogonini
- Genus: Allohelea
- Species: A. johannseni

Binomial name
- Allohelea johannseni Wirth, 1953

Species of fly

Allohelea johannseni is a species of predaceous midge in the family Ceratopogonidae.
