= Stilobezzia viridis =

Scientific classification
- Domain: Eukaryota
- Kingdom: Animalia
- Phylum: Arthropoda
- Class: Insecta
- Order: Diptera
- Family: Ceratopogonidae
- Tribe: Ceratopogonini
- Genus: Stilobezzia
- Species: S. viridis

Binomial name
- Stilobezzia viridis (Coquillett, 1901)

Synonyms
- Ceratopogon viridis Coquillett, 1901

Species of fly

Stilobezzia viridis is a species of predaceous midges in the family Ceratopogonidae.
