= Stilobezzia festiva =

- Male
- Female

Scientific classification
- Kingdom: Animalia
- Phylum: Arthropoda
- Clade: Pancrustacea
- Class: Insecta
- Order: Diptera
- Family: Ceratopogonidae
- Subfamily: Ceratopogoninae
- Tribe: Ceratopogonini
- Genus: Stilobezzia
- Species: S. festiva

Binomial name
- Stilobezzia festiva Kieffer, 1911

Synonyms
- Stilobezzia notata; Stilobezzia spirogyrae

Species of biting midge

Stilobezzia festiva is a species of biting midge in the family Ceratopogonidae. It is found in India, Pakistan, Sri Lanka, Nepal, Thailand, Vietnam, Japan, Taiwan, Indonesia and Malaysia. It was described by Jean-Jacques Kieffer in 1911. This species is monotypic.

== Description of the adult ==
This species is the type species of the genus Stilobezzia. It is small, about 2 mm in length.

The female has narrowly-separated eyes and a yellowish head. The thorax is yellowish and has a brownish band. The legs are also yellowish, with some areas of darker coloration. The wing has 2 prominent dark brown spots. The haltere is pale at the base, and the knob is dark brown.

The male is similar to the female, but is separated by the pattern and shape of the abdomen.

== Description of the larva ==
The head of the fourth-instar larva is yellow, and the antennae are small and cylindrical. There is also no thoracic pigmentation.

The second and third instar larvae are similar to the fourth instar larvae but differ in the sizes and ratios of their body parts.

The eggs are laid in a linear bunch with a jelly-like substance and are yellow in color. They are about 0.38 mm in length and 0.1 mm in width.

== Habitat and habits ==
The eggs and larvae of Stilobezzia festiva prevail in shallow forest pools with abundance of algae. The larvae keep themselves entangled within algal mesh while the pupa keep themselves attached to loose algal filaments.

The adults of both sexes are regularly attracted to light traps.
