= Stilobezzia beckae =

Scientific classification
- Domain: Eukaryota
- Kingdom: Animalia
- Phylum: Arthropoda
- Class: Insecta
- Order: Diptera
- Family: Ceratopogonidae
- Tribe: Ceratopogonini
- Genus: Stilobezzia
- Species: S. beckae

Binomial name
- Stilobezzia beckae Wirth, 1953

Species of fly

Stilobezzia beckae is a species of predaceous midges in the family Ceratopogonidae.
