= Downeshelea stonei =

Scientific classification
- Domain: Eukaryota
- Kingdom: Animalia
- Phylum: Arthropoda
- Class: Insecta
- Order: Diptera
- Family: Ceratopogonidae
- Tribe: Ceratopogonini
- Genus: Downeshelea
- Species: D. stonei

Binomial name
- Downeshelea stonei Wirth, 1953

Species of fly

Downeshelea stonei is a species of predaceous midges in the family Ceratopogonidae.
