= Alluaudomyia paraspina =

Scientific classification
- Domain: Eukaryota
- Kingdom: Animalia
- Phylum: Arthropoda
- Class: Insecta
- Order: Diptera
- Family: Ceratopogonidae
- Tribe: Ceratopogonini
- Genus: Alluaudomyia
- Species: A. paraspina

Binomial name
- Alluaudomyia paraspina Wirth, 1952

Species of insect

Alluaudomyia paraspina is a species of predaceous midge in the family Ceratopogonidae.
