= Downeshelea =

Scientific classification
- Domain: Eukaryota
- Kingdom: Animalia
- Phylum: Arthropoda
- Class: Insecta
- Order: Diptera
- Family: Ceratopogonidae
- Subfamily: Ceratopogoninae
- Tribe: Ceratopogonini
- Genus: Downeshelea; Wirth & Grogan, 1988

Genus of flies

Downeshelea is a genus of predaceous midges in the family Ceratopogonidae. There are more than 20 described species in Downeshelea.

== Species ==
These 27 species belong to the genus Downeshelea:

- Downeshelea bicornis Felippe-Bauer & Quintelas, 1993
- Downeshelea bimaculata Clastrier & Delecolle, 1990
- Downeshelea blantoni Lane & Wirth
- Downeshelea cebacoi Lane & Wirth
- Downeshelea charrua Felippe-Bauer & Spinelli, 1994
- Downeshelea chiapasi Lane & Wirth
- Downeshelea chirusi Lane & Wirth
- Downeshelea colombiae Lane & Wirth
- Downeshelea deanei Felippe-Bauer & Quintelas, 1995
- Downeshelea fluminensis Felippe-Bauer & Quintelas, 1993
- Downeshelea fuscipennis Lane & Wirth
- Downeshelea grogani
- Downeshelea lanei Felippe-Bauer & Borkent
- Downeshelea leei (Debenham, 1972)
- Downeshelea macclurei Ratanaworabhan & Wirth
- Downeshelea mcdanieli (Tokunaga, 1959)
- Downeshelea multilineata (Lutz, 1914)
- Downeshelea nigra (Tokunaga, 1963)
- Downeshelea panamensis Lane & Wirth
- Downeshelea quasidentica Felippe-Bauer & Quintelas, 1993
- Downeshelea scanloni Ratanaworabhan & Wirth
- Downeshelea sepikensis (Debenham, 1972)
- Downeshelea stenochora Wirth & Giles, 1990
- Downeshelea stonei Wirth, 1953
- Downeshelea unimaculata (Debenham, 1972)
- Downeshelea whartoni Ratanaworabhan & Wirth
- Downeshelea xanthogonua (Tokunaga, 1963)
