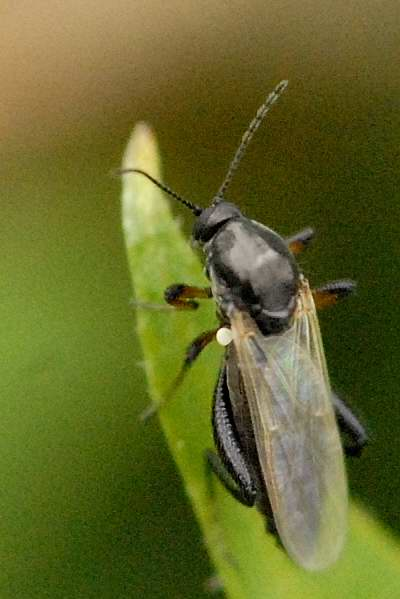
- Serromyia femorata

Scientific classification
- Kingdom: Animalia
- Phylum: Arthropoda
- Class: Insecta
- Order: Diptera
- Family: Ceratopogonidae
- Tribe: Ceratopogonini
- Genus: Serromyia; Meigen, 1818

Species
- see text

Synonyms
- Atmobia Bigot, 1857; Prionomyia Stephens, 1829

= Serromyia =

Genus of flies

Serromyia is a genus of biting midges in the subfamily Ceratopogoninae.

== Species ==
- S. atra (Meigen, 1818)
- S. barber Wirth, 1952
- S. crassifemorata Malloch, 1914
- S. dipetala Remm, 1965
- S. femorata (Meigen, 1804)
- S. ledicola Kieffer, 1925
- S. mangrovi Dalacolle & Braverman, 1987
- S. morio (Fabricius, 1775)
- S. rufitarsis (Meigen, 1818)
- S. subinermis Kieffer, 1919
