= Stilobezzia antennalis =

Scientific classification
- Domain: Eukaryota
- Kingdom: Animalia
- Phylum: Arthropoda
- Class: Insecta
- Order: Diptera
- Family: Ceratopogonidae
- Genus: Stilobezzia
- Species: S. antennalis

Binomial name
- Stilobezzia antennalis (Coquillett, 1901)

Synonyms
- Ceratopogon antennalis Coquillett, 1901

Species of fly

Stilobezzia antennalis is a species of predaceous midge in the family Ceratopogonidae.
