= Alluaudomyia needhami =

Scientific classification
- Domain: Eukaryota
- Kingdom: Animalia
- Phylum: Arthropoda
- Class: Insecta
- Order: Diptera
- Family: Ceratopogonidae
- Genus: Alluaudomyia
- Species: A. needhami

Binomial name
- Alluaudomyia needhami Thomsen, 1935

Species of midge

Alluaudomyia needhami is a species of predaceous midge in the family Ceratopogonidae.
