= Allohelea =

Scientific classification
- Domain: Eukaryota
- Kingdom: Animalia
- Phylum: Arthropoda
- Class: Insecta
- Order: Diptera
- Family: Ceratopogonidae
- Subfamily: Ceratopogoninae
- Tribe: Ceratopogonini
- Genus: Allohelea; Kieffer, 1917

Genus of flies

Allohelea is a genus of predaceous midges in the family Ceratopogonidae. There are more than 30 described species in Allohelea.

== Species ==
These 39 species belong to the genus Allohelea:

- Allohelea afra Clastrier & Delecolle, 1990
- Allohelea ampligonata Ratanaworabhan & Wirth
- Allohelea annulata Yu & Yan, 2004
- Allohelea arboricola Clastrier & Delecolle, 1990
- Allohelea arcuata Ratanaworabhan & Wirth
- Allohelea basiflava (Tokunaga, 1963)
- Allohelea basilobata Ratanaworabhan & Wirth
- Allohelea bottimeri Wirth, 1991
- Allohelea brinchangensis Ratanaworabhan & Wirth
- Allohelea camptostyla Ratanaworabhan & Wirth
- Allohelea capitata Ratanaworabhan & Wirth
- Allohelea chelagonata Ratanaworabhan & Wirth
- Allohelea digitata Ratanaworabhan & Wirth
- Allohelea distortifemur Wirth, 1991
- Allohelea fruticosa Yan & Yu, 1996
- Allohelea guineensis Clastrier & Delecolle, 1990
- Allohelea harpagonifera (Debenham, 1972)
- Allohelea inflativena Tokunaga
- Allohelea insularis (Tokunaga, 1941)
- Allohelea jianfengensis Liu & Yu, 1996
- Allohelea johannseni Wirth, 1953
- Allohelea kindiae Clastrier & Delecolle, 1990
- Allohelea limosa Clastrier & Delecolle, 1990
- Allohelea minxia Yu & Yan, 2004
- Allohelea multilineata (Lutz, 1914)
- Allohelea nebulosa Coquillett
- Allohelea neotropica Wirth, 1991
- Allohelea nigripes Ratanaworabhan & Wirth
- Allohelea parafurcata Ratanaworabhan & Wirth
- Allohelea paucimaculata Clastrier & Delecolle, 1990
- Allohelea pedicellata Wirth, 1991
- Allohelea qingdaoensis Ren & Yu, 1999
- Allohelea solidipedalis (Tokunaga, 1963)
- Allohelea superlobata Ratanaworabhan & Wirth
- Allohelea tessellata (J.W.Zetterstedt, 1850)
- Allohelea tricuspis (Debenham, 1972)
- Allohelea vespertillo Szadziewski, Gwizdalska-Kentzer & Gilka, 2011
- Allohelea weemsi Wirth, 1991
- Allohelea yorkensis (Debenham, 1972)
