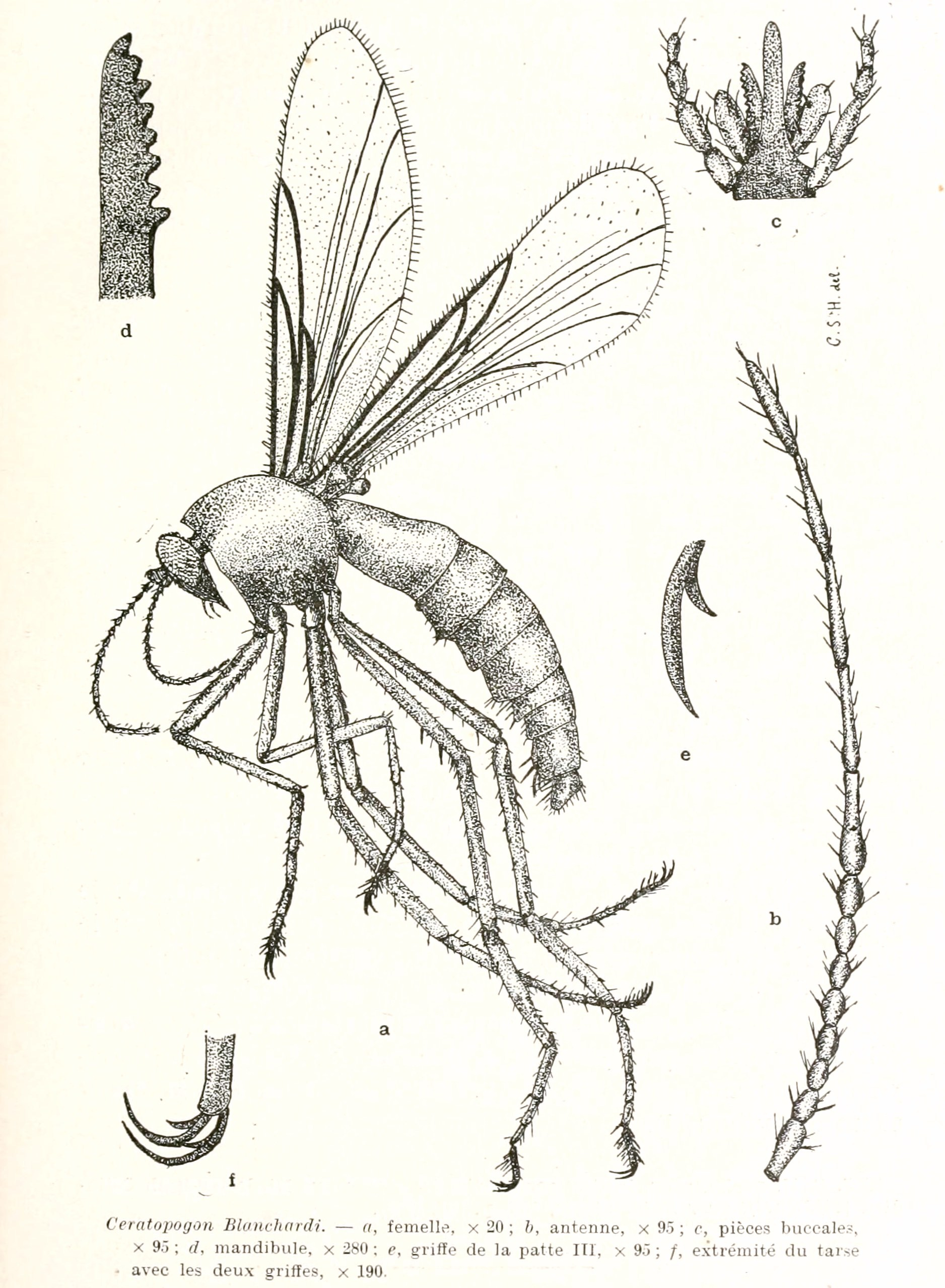
- Ceratopogon blanchardi

Scientific classification
- Domain: Eukaryota
- Kingdom: Animalia
- Phylum: Arthropoda
- Class: Insecta
- Order: Diptera
- Family: Ceratopogonidae
- Genus: Ceratopogon; Meigen, 1803

Synonyms
- Anakempia Kieffer, 1924; Cerapogon Rafinesque, 1815; Diplohelea Kieffer, 1925; Helea Meigen, 1800; Isohelea Kieffer, 1921; Psilohelea Kieffer, 1915

= Ceratopogon =

Genus of flies

Ceratopogon is a genus of flies belonging to the family Ceratopogonidae.

The genus was first described by Meigen in 1803.

The genus has almost cosmopolitan distribution.

Species:

- Ceratopogon communis
- Ceratopogon crassinervis
- Ceratopogon grandiforceps
- Ceratopogon lacteipennis
- Ceratopogon niveipennis
- Ceratopogon paucisetosus
