= Schizohelea =

Scientific classification
- Domain: Eukaryota
- Kingdom: Animalia
- Phylum: Arthropoda
- Class: Insecta
- Order: Diptera
- Family: Ceratopogonidae
- Genus: Schizohelea; Kieffer, 1917

Genus of flies

Schizohelea is a genus of flies belonging to the family Ceratopogonidae.

The species of this genus are found in Europe and Northern America.

Species:

- Schizohelea leucopeza (Meigen, 1804)
