= Monohelea =

Scientific classification
- Domain: Eukaryota
- Kingdom: Animalia
- Phylum: Arthropoda
- Class: Insecta
- Order: Diptera
- Family: Ceratopogonidae
- Genus: Monohelea; Kieffer, 1917

Genus of flies

Monohelea is a genus of flies belonging to the family Ceratopogonidae.

The genus has cosmopolitan distribution.

Species:

- Ceratopogon clunipes (Loew, 1850)
- Monohelea accipiter Debenham, 1972
