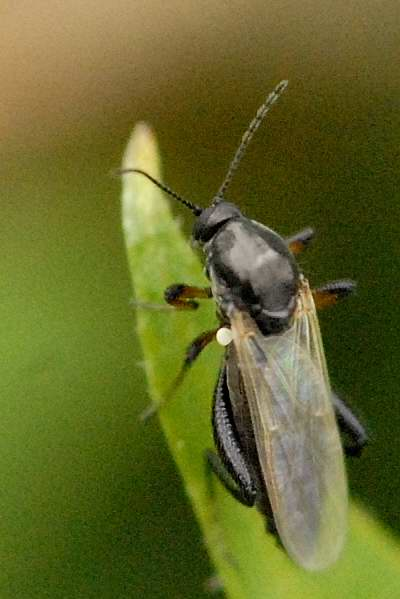
- Serromyia femorata

Scientific classification
- Domain: Eukaryota
- Kingdom: Animalia
- Phylum: Arthropoda
- Class: Insecta
- Order: Diptera
- Family: Ceratopogonidae
- Genus: Serromyia
- Species: S. femorata

Binomial name
- Serromyia femorata (Meigen, 1804)

Synonyms
- Ceratopogon femorata Meigen, 1804

= Serromyia femorata =

Species of fly

Serromyia femorata is a species of biting midges (insects in the subfamily Ceratopogoninae). The species is noted for its peculiar mating practice: during mating, the ventral surfaces and mouthparts of the partners touch. After copulation, the female sucks out the body fluid of her mate through the mouth, thereby killing him, which may be a form of offspring provisioning through sexual cannibalism.
