= Alluaudomyia =

Scientific classification
- Domain: Eukaryota
- Kingdom: Animalia
- Phylum: Arthropoda
- Class: Insecta
- Order: Diptera
- Family: Ceratopogonidae
- Subfamily: Ceratopogoninae
- Tribe: Ceratopogonini
- Genus: Alluaudomyia; Kieffer, 1913

Diversity
- at least 180 species

Genus of flies

Alluaudomyia is a genus of predaceous midges in the family Ceratopogonidae. There are more than 180 described species in Alluaudomyia.

== See also ==
- List of Alluaudomyia species
