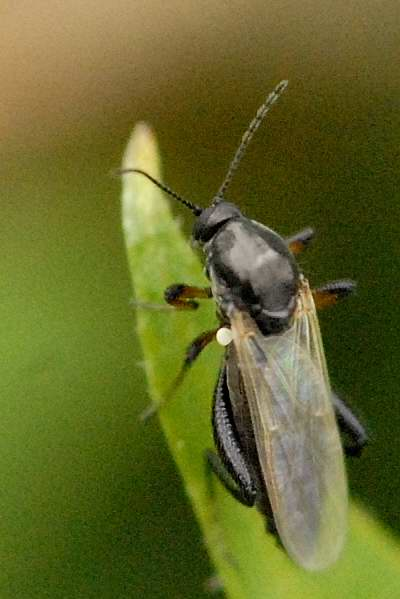
- Serromyia femorata

Scientific classification
- Domain: Eukaryota
- Kingdom: Animalia
- Phylum: Arthropoda
- Class: Insecta
- Order: Diptera
- Family: Ceratopogonidae
- Subfamily: Ceratopogoninae
- Tribe: Ceratopogonini

Genera
- Allohelea Kieffer, 1917; Alluaudomyia Kieffer, 1913; Brachypogon Kieffer, 1899; Ceratoculicoides; Ceratopogon (Meigen, 1803; Downeshelea; Echinohelea; Kolenohelea De Meillon & Wirth, 1981; Monohelea Kieffer, 1917; Neurohelea Kieffer, 1925; Parabezzia; Rhynchohelea; Schizohelea Kieffer, 1917; Serromyia Meigen, 1818; Stilobezzia Kieffer, 1911

= Ceratopogonini =

Tribe of flies

Ceratopogonini is a tribe of biting midges, family Ceratopogonidae.
