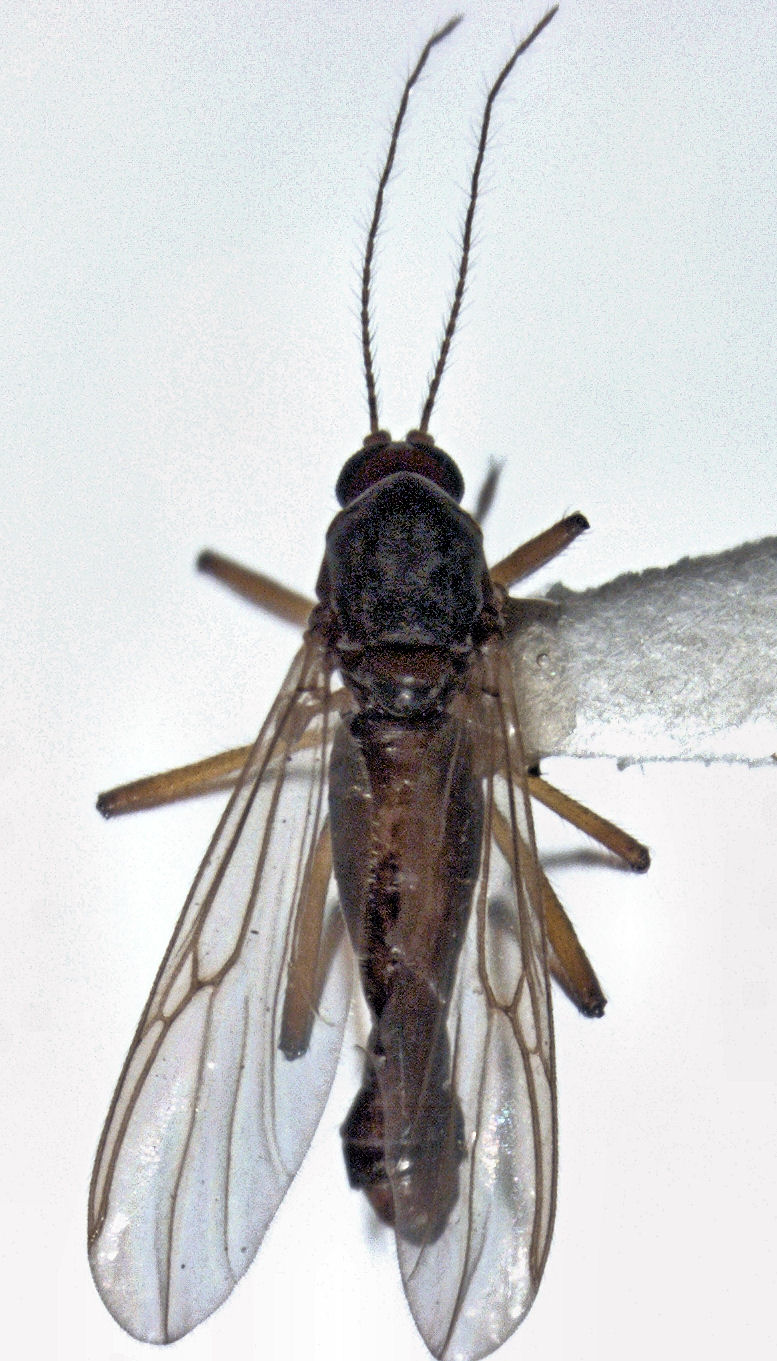

Scientific classification
- Kingdom: Animalia
- Phylum: Arthropoda
- Class: Insecta
- Order: Diptera
- Family: Ceratopogonidae
- Subfamily: Ceratopogoninae
- Tribe: Ceratopogonini
- Genus: Stilobezzia; Kieffer, 1911

Diversity
- at least 330 species

= Stilobezzia =

Genus of flies

Stilobezzia is a genus of predaceous midges in the family Ceratopogonidae. There are more than 330 described species in the genus Stilobezzia.

== See also ==
- List of Stilobezzia species
