= Probezzia infuscata =

Scientific classification
- Domain: Eukaryota
- Kingdom: Animalia
- Phylum: Arthropoda
- Class: Insecta
- Order: Diptera
- Family: Ceratopogonidae
- Tribe: Sphaeromiini
- Genus: Probezzia
- Species: P. infuscata

Binomial name
- Probezzia infuscata Malloch, 1915

Species of fly

Probezzia infuscata is a species of biting midges in the family Ceratopogonidae.
