= Probezzia xanthogaster =

Scientific classification
- Domain: Eukaryota
- Kingdom: Animalia
- Phylum: Arthropoda
- Class: Insecta
- Order: Diptera
- Family: Ceratopogonidae
- Tribe: Sphaeromiini
- Genus: Probezzia
- Species: P. xanthogaster

Binomial name
- Probezzia xanthogaster (Kieffer, 1917)

Synonyms
- Bezzia xanthogaster Kieffer, 1917; Ceratopogon elegans Coquillett, 1901; Dicrobezzia xanthogaster (Kieffer, 1917)

Species of fly

Probezzia xanthogaster is a species of biting midges in the family Ceratopogonidae.
