= Nilobezzia mallochi =

Scientific classification
- Kingdom: Animalia
- Phylum: Arthropoda
- Class: Insecta
- Order: Diptera
- Family: Ceratopogonidae
- Tribe: Sphaeromiini
- Genus: Nilobezzia
- Species: N. mallochi

Binomial name
- Nilobezzia mallochi Wirth, 1962

Species of fly

Nilobezzia mallochi is a species of biting midge in the family Ceratopogonidae.
