= Mallochohelea atripes =

Scientific classification
- Kingdom: Animalia
- Phylum: Arthropoda
- Class: Insecta
- Order: Diptera
- Family: Ceratopogonidae
- Tribe: Sphaeromiini
- Genus: Mallochohelea
- Species: M. atripes

Binomial name
- Mallochohelea atripes Wirth, 1962

Species of fly

Mallochohelea atripes is a species of biting midges in the family Ceratopogonidae.
