= Mallochohelea albibasis =

Scientific classification
- Kingdom: Animalia
- Phylum: Arthropoda
- Class: Insecta
- Order: Diptera
- Family: Ceratopogonidae
- Tribe: Sphaeromiini
- Genus: Mallochohelea
- Species: M. albibasis

Binomial name
- Mallochohelea albibasis (Malloch, 1915)

Synonyms
- Johannsenomyia albibasis Malloch, 1915

Species of fly

Mallochohelea albibasis is a species of biting midges in the family Ceratopogonidae.
