= Sphaeromias bifidus =

Scientific classification
- Domain: Eukaryota
- Kingdom: Animalia
- Phylum: Arthropoda
- Class: Insecta
- Order: Diptera
- Family: Ceratopogonidae
- Tribe: Sphaeromiini
- Genus: Sphaeromias
- Species: S. bifidus

Binomial name
- Sphaeromias bifidus Wirth & Grogan, 1979

Species of fly

Sphaeromias bifidus is a species of biting midges, and are insects in the family Ceratopogonidae.
