= Nilobezzia =

Scientific classification
- Kingdom: Animalia
- Phylum: Arthropoda
- Class: Insecta
- Order: Diptera
- Family: Ceratopogonidae
- Subfamily: Ceratopogoninae
- Tribe: Sphaeromiini
- Genus: Nilobezzia; Kieffer, 1921

Genus of flies

Nilobezzia is a genus of biting midges in the family Ceratopogonidae. There are more than 70 described species in Nilobezzia.

== Species ==
These 78 species belong to the genus Nilobezzia:

- Nilobezzia acanthopus (de Meijere, 1907)
- Nilobezzia alipennis Kieffer, 1911
- Nilobezzia allotropica Kieffer, 1913
- Nilobezzia aranea Debenham, 1974
- Nilobezzia arcuatipes Kieffer, 1913
- Nilobezzia armata Kieffer, 1921
- Nilobezzia ateles (Macfie, 1940)
- Nilobezzia atoporna Yu & Zhang, 1997
- Nilobezzia badia Johannsen, 1931
- Nilobezzia bakeri (Kieffer, 1921)
- Nilobezzia basispinigera Debenham, 1974
- Nilobezzia belligera (Meillon, 1940)
- Nilobezzia borneana (Macfie, 1934)
- Nilobezzia brevicornis (Wirth, 1952)
- Nilobezzia brevipalpis (Kieffer, 1924)
- Nilobezzia claripennia (Kieffer, 1912)
- Nilobezzia claripennis (Kieffer, 1916)
- Nilobezzia conjuncta Kieffer, 1916
- Nilobezzia connexa Kieffer, 1916
- Nilobezzia conspicua (Johannsen, 1931)
- Nilobezzia curticornis (Kieffer, 1917)
- Nilobezzia diffidens (Johannsen, 1931)
- Nilobezzia discolor (de Meijere, 1907)
- Nilobezzia disjuncta (Kieffer, 1913)
- Nilobezzia disticta (Kieffer, 1911)
- Nilobezzia duodenalis Liu, Ge & Liu, 1996
- Nilobezzia fijiensis Wirth & Giles, 1990
- Nilobezzia flavida Remm, 1980
- Nilobezzia flaviventris (Kieffer, 1910)
- Nilobezzia formosa (Loew, 1869)
- Nilobezzia formosana (Kieffer, 1912)
- Nilobezzia fusca Kieffer, 1921
- Nilobezzia fuscitarsis Debenham, 1974
- Nilobezzia hamifera (Kieffer, 1913)
- Nilobezzia henanei Clastrier, 1962
- Nilobezzia hunyani Meillon, 1943
- Nilobezzia inermipes (Kieffer, 1916)
- Nilobezzia insons Johannsen, 1931
- Nilobezzia japana (Tokunaga, 1939)
- Nilobezzia javanensis Macfie, 1934
- Nilobezzia kerteszi (Kieffer, 1916)
- Nilobezzia lacteipennis (Kieffer, 1910)
- Nilobezzia leucothrix Remm, 1980
- Nilobezzia maai Tokunaga, 1966
- Nilobezzia mallochi Wirth, 1962
- Nilobezzia manicata Clastrier, 1958
- Nilobezzia minor (Wirth, 1952)
- Nilobezzia myrmedon (Kieffer, 1921)
- Nilobezzia neotropica (Macfie, 1940)
- Nilobezzia nigra Sen & Gupta, 1958
- Nilobezzia nigricans (Kieffer, 1910)
- Nilobezzia nigritibialis (Ingram & Macfie, 1921)
- Nilobezzia nigriventris (Kieffer, 1924)
- Nilobezzia nilotica (Kieffer, 1924)
- Nilobezzia nipponensis (Tokunaga, 1939)
- Nilobezzia ochriventris Edwards, 1929
- Nilobezzia paraensis (Lane, 1958)
- Nilobezzia photophila (Kieffer, 1913)
- Nilobezzia pictipes (Kieffer, 1910)
- Nilobezzia posticata (Zetterstedt, 1850)
- Nilobezzia punctipes Macfie, 1934
- Nilobezzia raphaelis Salm, 1918
- Nilobezzia robusta (Meillon, 1937)
- Nilobezzia schwarzii (Coquillett, 1901)
- Nilobezzia scotti (Kieffer, 1911)
- Nilobezzia semirufa (Kieffer, 1921)
- Nilobezzia setipes Coquillett
- Nilobezzia setoensis (Tokunaga, 1939)
- Nilobezzia simplicior Debenham, 1974
- Nilobezzia spinifera (Kieffer, 1916)
- Nilobezzia stictonota Kieffer, 1911
- Nilobezzia subtilicrinus Debenham, 1974
- Nilobezzia tetrasticta (Kieffer, 1911)
- Nilobezzia vaga (Kieffer, 1911)
- Nilobezzia virago Debenham, 1974
- Nilobezzia whartoni Lee, 1948
- Nilobezzia yasumatsui Wirth & Ratanaworabhan, 1981
- Nilobezzia zibanensis Clastrier, 1962
