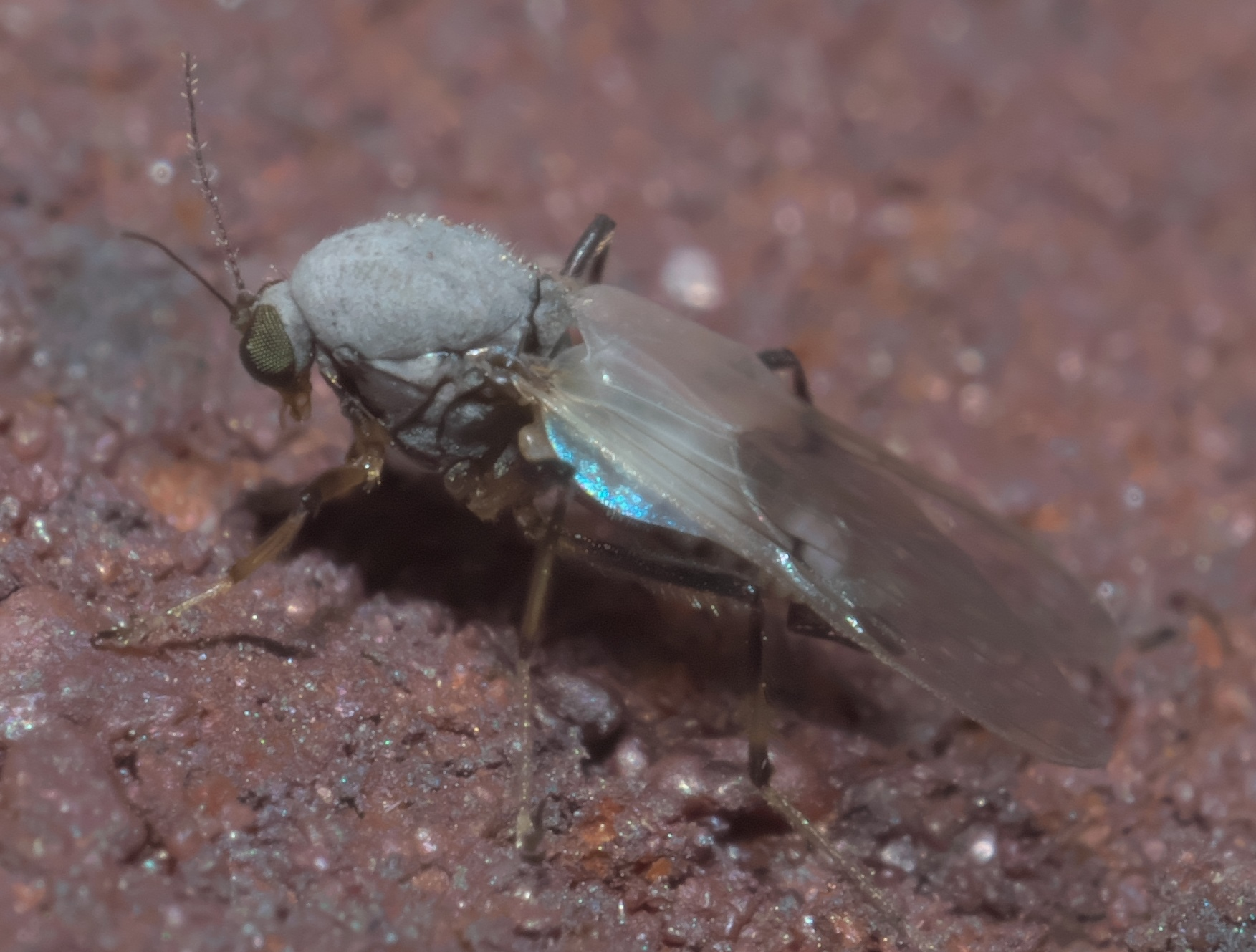

Scientific classification
- Domain: Eukaryota
- Kingdom: Animalia
- Phylum: Arthropoda
- Class: Insecta
- Order: Diptera
- Family: Ceratopogonidae
- Subfamily: Ceratopogoninae
- Tribe: Sphaeromiini
- Genus: Jenkinshelea; Macfie, 1934

= Jenkinshelea =

Genus of flies

Jenkinshelea is a genus of biting midges in the family Ceratopogonidae. There are about 18 described species in Jenkinshelea.

== Species ==
These 18 species belong to the genus Jenkinshelea:

- Jenkinshelea accraensis (Ingram & Macfie, 1923)
- Jenkinshelea albaria (Coquillett, 1895)
- Jenkinshelea blantoni Grogan & Wirth, 1977
- Jenkinshelea corea Meillon, 1942
- Jenkinshelea distincta Meillon & Wirth, 1983
- Jenkinshelea djalonensis Clastrier, 1983
- Jenkinshelea magnipennis (Johannsen, 1908)
- Jenkinshelea niphanae Grogan & Wirth, 1981
- Jenkinshelea papuae Tokunaga, 1966
- Jenkinshelea polyxenae Meillon, 1936
- Jenkinshelea rhodesiensis Meillon, 1937
- Jenkinshelea setosiforceps Grogan & Wirth, 1981
- Jenkinshelea setosipennis Kieffer
- Jenkinshelea stenoptera Remm, 1979
- Jenkinshelea stonei Grogan & Wirth, 1977
- Jenkinshelea sudwalai Meillon & Wirth, 1983
- Jenkinshelea tokunagai Grogan & Wirth, 1981
- Jenkinshelea trisensillata Clastrier, 1983
