= Sphaeromias =

Scientific classification
- Kingdom: Animalia
- Phylum: Arthropoda
- Clade: Pancrustacea
- Class: Insecta
- Order: Diptera
- Family: Ceratopogonidae
- Tribe: Sphaeromiini
- Genus: Sphaeromias; Curtis, 1928

Synonyms
- Xylocrypta Kieffer, 1899

Genus of flies

Sphaeromias is a genus of biting midges in the family Ceratopogonidae. There are at least four described species in Sphaeromias.

== Species ==
- Sphaeromias albomarginatus Curtis
- Sphaeromias bifidus Wirth & Grogan, 1979
- Sphaeromias gilvus Grogan, 2022
- Sphaeromias longipennis (Loew, 1861)

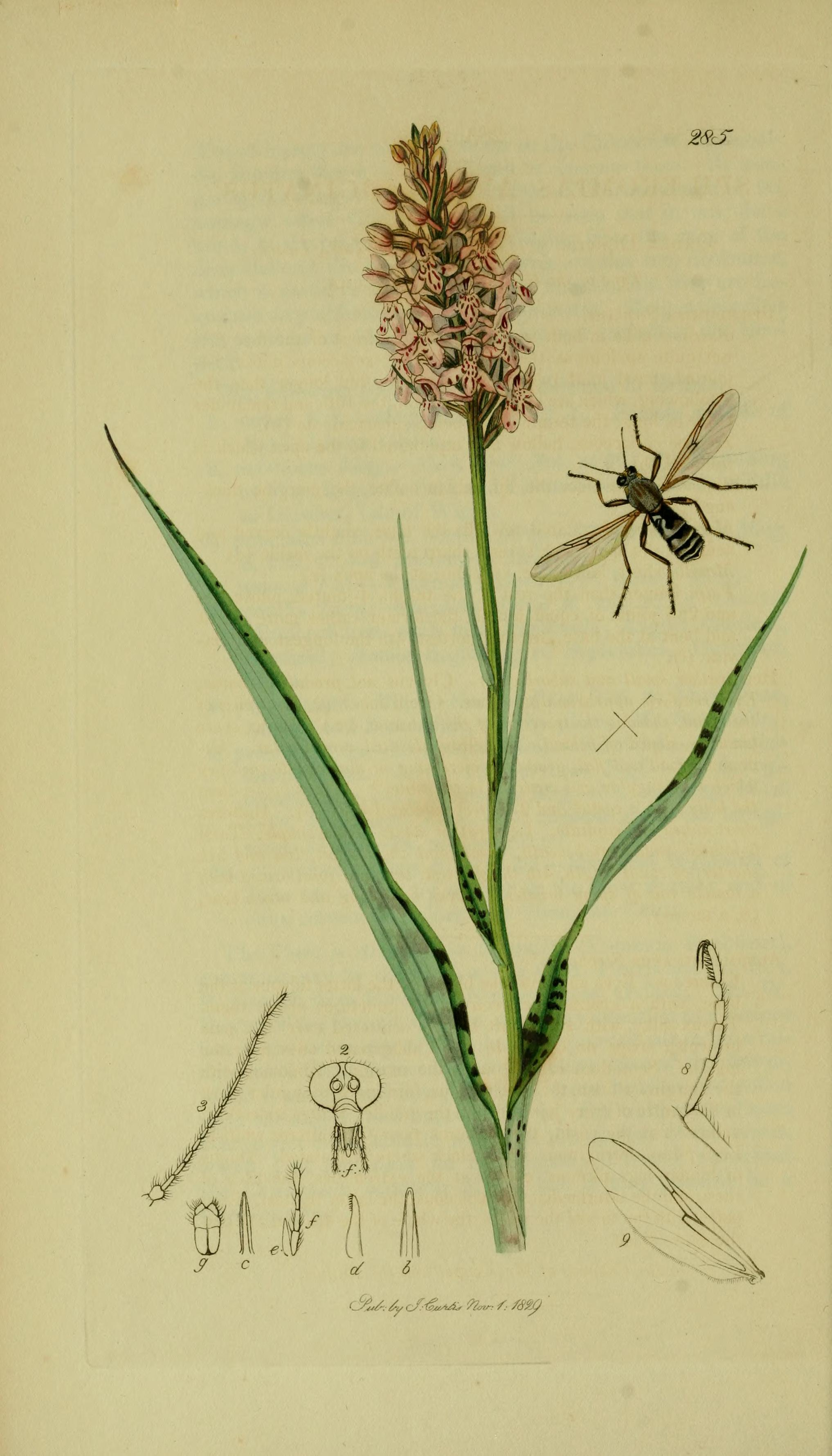
The Sphaeromias with a Dactylorhiza maculata (Spotted Orchis)
