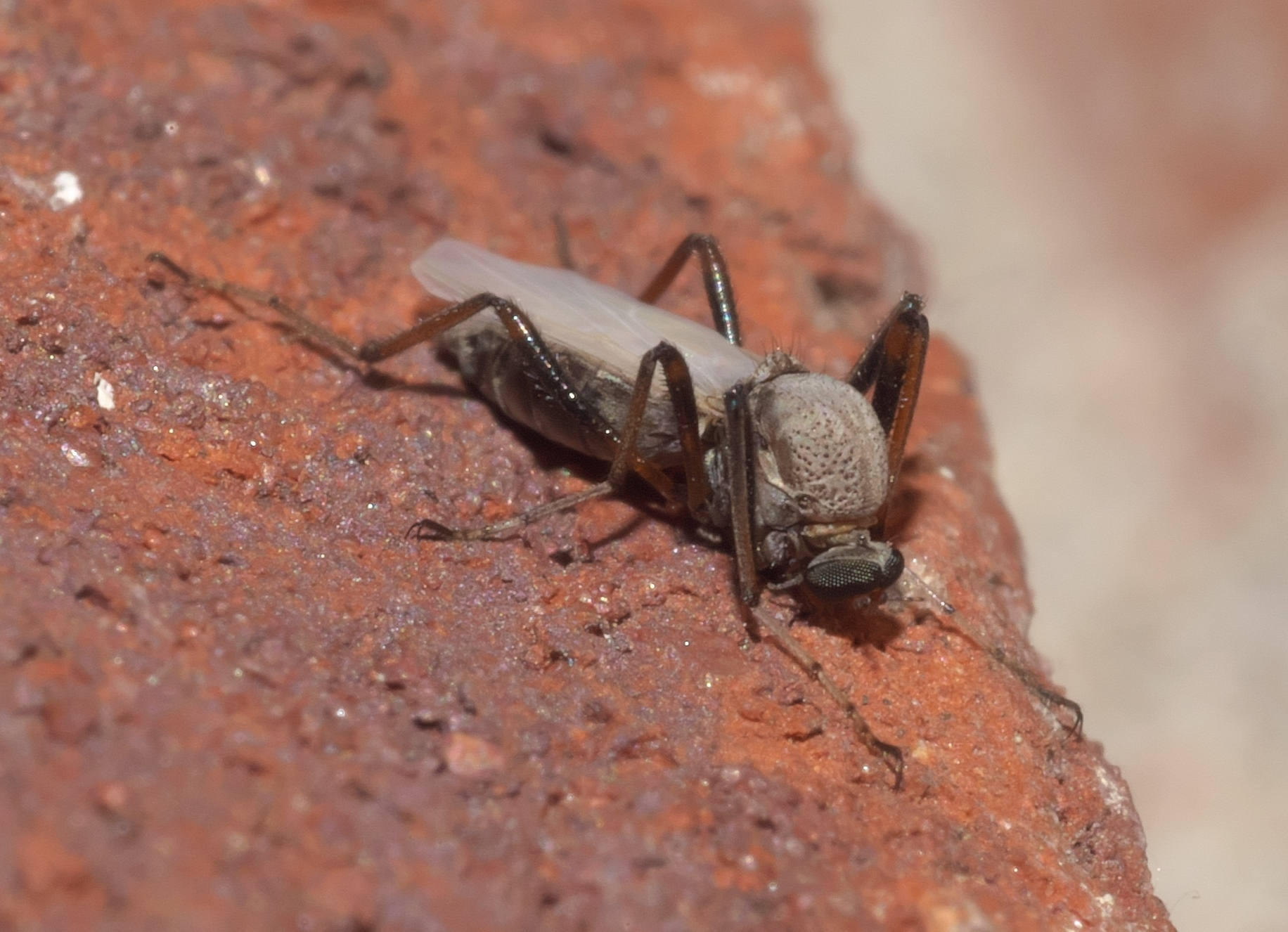

Scientific classification
- Domain: Eukaryota
- Kingdom: Animalia
- Phylum: Arthropoda
- Class: Insecta
- Order: Diptera
- Family: Ceratopogonidae
- Genus: Sphaeromias
- Species: S. longipennis

Binomial name
- Sphaeromias longipennis (Loew, 1861)

Synonyms
- Ceratopogon longipennis Loew, 1861; Homohelea longipennis (Lowe, 1861)

= Sphaeromias longipennis =

Species of fly

Sphaeromias longipennis is a species of biting midges, insects in the family Ceratopogonidae.
