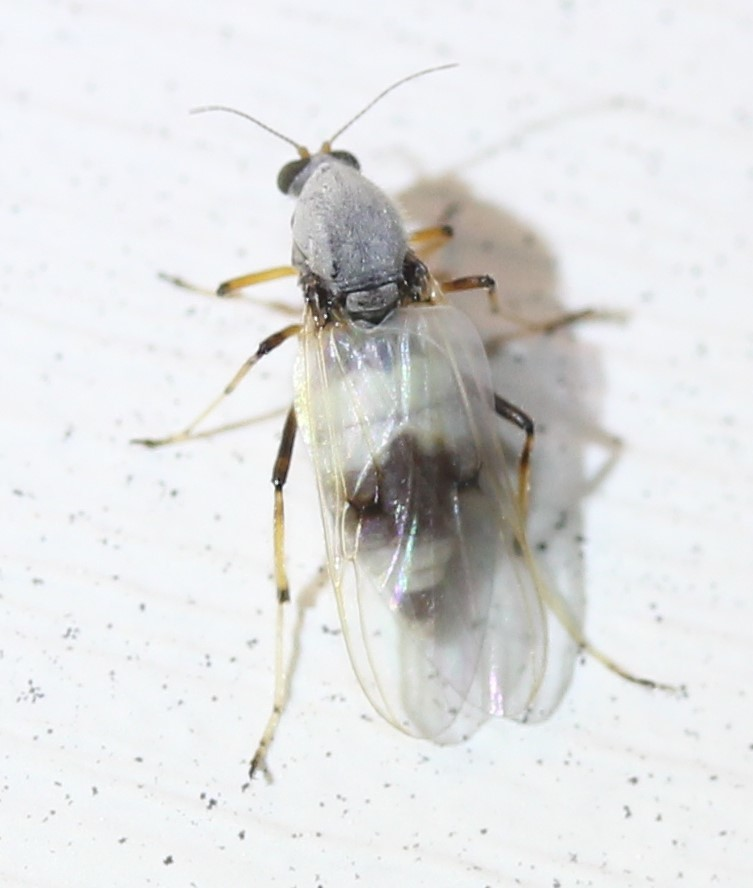
- Jenkinshelea albaria, Illinois

Scientific classification
- Domain: Eukaryota
- Kingdom: Animalia
- Phylum: Arthropoda
- Class: Insecta
- Order: Diptera
- Family: Ceratopogonidae
- Genus: Jenkinshelea
- Species: J. albaria

Binomial name
- Jenkinshelea albaria (Coquillett, 1895)

Synonyms
- Ceratopogon albaria Coquillett, 1895; Johannsenomyia aequalis Malloch, 1915

= Jenkinshelea albaria =

Species of fly

Jenkinshelea albaria is a species of biting midges in the family Ceratopogonidae.
