= Probezzia =

Scientific classification
- Domain: Eukaryota
- Kingdom: Animalia
- Phylum: Arthropoda
- Class: Insecta
- Order: Diptera
- Family: Ceratopogonidae
- Tribe: Sphaeromiini
- Genus: Probezzia; Kieffer, 1906

Synonyms
- Dicrobezzia Kieffer, 1919

Genus of flies

Probezzia is a genus of biting midges in the family Ceratopogonidae. There are at least 20 described species in Probezzia.

== Species ==
These 28 species belong to the genus Probezzia:

- Probezzia albitibia Wirth, 1971^{i c g b}
- Probezzia albiventris (Loew, 1861)^{i c g}
- Probezzia atriventris Wirth, 1951^{i c g}
- Probezzia bottimeri Wirth, 1971^{i c g}
- Probezzia concinna (Meigen, 1818)^{i c g}
- Probezzia fairchildi Wirth, 1994^{c g}
- Probezzia fiscipennis Wirth, 1971^{c g}
- Probezzia flavonigra (Coquillett, 1905)^{i c g}
- Probezzia fuscipennis Wirth, 1971^{i c g}
- Probezzia glicki Wirth, 1994^{c g}
- Probezzia infuscata Malloch, 1915^{i c g b}
- Probezzia jamnbacki Wirth, 1971^{i c g}
- Probezzia ludoviciana Wirth, 1951^{i c g}
- Probezzia manshurica Remm, 1993^{c g}
- Probezzia meadi Wirth, 1994^{c g}
- Probezzia nigra Wirth, 1971^{i c g}
- Probezzia pallida Malloch, 1914^{i c g b}
- Probezzia rosewalli Wirth, 1951^{i c g}
- Probezzia sabroskyi Wirth, 1951^{i c g}
- Probezzia seminigra (Panzer, 1798)^{i c g}
- Probezzia smithii (Coquillett, 1901)^{i c g}
- Probezzia soikai (Harant & Huttel, 1952)^{c g}
- Probezzia sugiyamai (Tokunaga, 1940)^{c g}
- Probezzia unica (Johannsen, 1934)^{i c g}
- Probezzia weemsi Wirth, 1994^{c g}
- Probezzia williamsi Wirth, 1971^{i c g}
- Probezzia wirthi Spinelli & Grogan, 1997^{c g}
- Probezzia xanthogaster (Kieffer, 1917)^{i c g b}

Data sources: i = ITIS, c = Catalogue of Life, g = GBIF, b = Bugguide.net
