= Mallochohelea =

Scientific classification
- Kingdom: Animalia
- Phylum: Arthropoda
- Class: Insecta
- Order: Diptera
- Family: Ceratopogonidae
- Tribe: Sphaeromiini
- Genus: Mallochohelea; Wirth, 1962

Genus of insects

Mallochohelea is a genus of biting midges in the family Ceratopogonidae. There are at least 40 described species in Mallochohelea.

== Species ==
These 48 species belong to the genus Mallochohelea:

- Mallochohelea aenipes (Macfie, 1940)^{c g}
- Mallochohelea albibasis (Malloch, 1915)^{i c g b}
- Mallochohelea albiclava (Kieffer, 1921)^{c g}
- Mallochohelea albihalter Wirth, 1962^{i c g}
- Mallochohelea alpina (Clastrier, 1962)^{c g}
- Mallochohelea aspera Debenham, 1974^{c g}
- Mallochohelea atripes Wirth, 1962^{i c g b}
- Mallochohelea aukurabis Meillon & Wirth, 1983^{c g}
- Mallochohelea australiensis (Lee, 1948)^{c}
- Mallochohelea boettcheri (Edwards, 1929)^{c g}
- Mallochohelea caudellii (Coquillett, 1905)^{i c g}
- Mallochohelea errinae (Meillon, 1940)^{c g}
- Mallochohelea flavidula (Malloch, 1914)^{i c g}
- Mallochohelea fluminea Meillon & Wirth, 1981^{c g}
- Mallochohelea hamata Meillon & Wirth, 1987^{c g}
- Mallochohelea hansfordi Meillon & Wirth, 1983^{c g}
- Mallochohelea hardyi (Tokunaga, 1966)^{c}
- Mallochohelea inermis (Kieffer, 1909)^{c g}
- Mallochohelea kirki (Macfie, 1939)^{c g}
- Mallochohelea limitrofe Spinelli & Felippe-Bauer, 1990^{c g}
- Mallochohelea luaboensis (Meillon, 1959)^{c g}
- Mallochohelea munda (Loew, 1864)^{c g}
- Mallochohelea nemoralis (Macfie, 1940)^{c g}
- Mallochohelea nigripes (Macfie, 1939)^{c g}
- Mallochohelea nitida (Macquart, 1826)^{c g}
- Mallochohelea prominens (Johannsen, 1931)^{c g}
- Mallochohelea pullata (Wirth, 1952)^{i c g}
- Mallochohelea remota (Kieffer, 1919)^{c g}
- Mallochohelea sabroskyi (Tokunaga, 1959)^{c g}
- Mallochohelea satelles Debenham, 1974^{c g}
- Mallochohelea scandinaviae (Clastrier, 1962)^{c g}
- Mallochohelea senex Debenham, 1974^{c g}
- Mallochohelea setigera (Loew, 1864)^{c g}
- Mallochohelea shibayai (Tokunaga, 1940)^{c g}
- Mallochohelea sidis (Meillon, 1959)^{c g}
- Mallochohelea silvicola (Goetghebuer, 1920)^{c g}
- Mallochohelea siricis (Meillon, 1961)^{c g}
- Mallochohelea smithi (Lewis, 1956)^{i c g}
- Mallochohelea spinipes Wirth, 1962^{i c g}
- Mallochohelea stygia Debenham, 1974^{c g}
- Mallochohelea sybleae (Wirth, 1952)^{i c g}
- Mallochohelea texensis Wirth, 1962^{i c g}
- Mallochohelea tianshanica Remm, 1980^{c g}
- Mallochohelea tumidicornis Debenham, 1974^{c g}
- Mallochohelea turneri (Ingram & Macfie, 1923)^{c}
- Mallochohelea unca Meillon & Wirth, 1987^{c g}
- Mallochohelea variegata Wirth, 1962^{i c g}
- Mallochohelea vernalis Remm, 1965^{c g}

Data sources: i = ITIS, c = Catalogue of Life, g = GBIF, b = Bugguide.net
