= Probezzia albitibia =

Scientific classification
- Domain: Eukaryota
- Kingdom: Animalia
- Phylum: Arthropoda
- Class: Insecta
- Order: Diptera
- Family: Ceratopogonidae
- Genus: Probezzia
- Species: P. albitibia

Binomial name
- Probezzia albitibia Wirth, 1971

Species of fly

Probezzia albitibia is a species of biting midges in the family Ceratopogonidae. It is found in North America.
