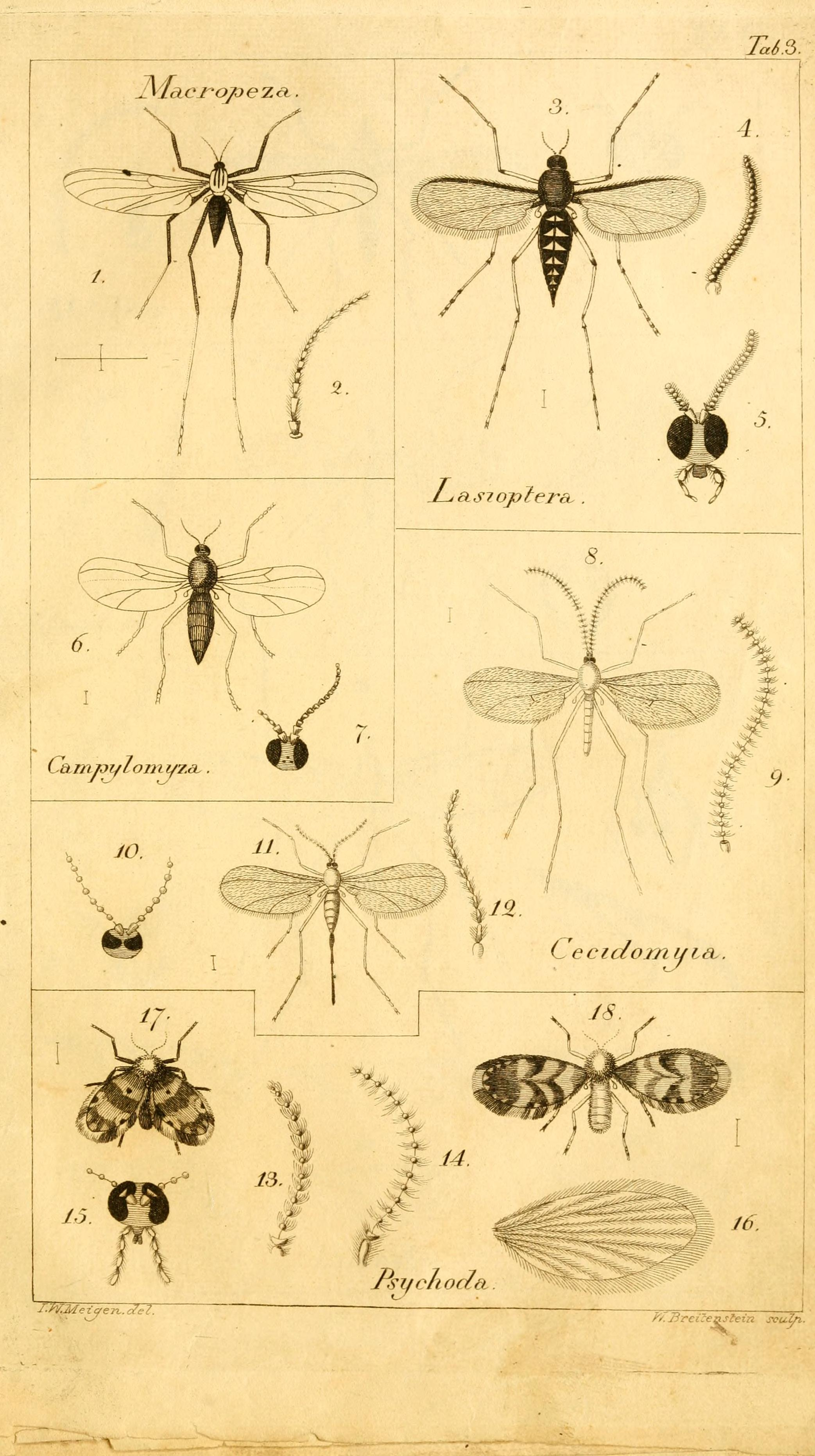
- Macropeza in Meigen Systematische Beschreibung der bekannten europäischen zweiflügeligen Insekten

Scientific classification
- Domain: Eukaryota
- Kingdom: Animalia
- Phylum: Arthropoda
- Class: Insecta
- Order: Diptera
- Family: Ceratopogonidae
- Genus: Macropeza; Meigen, 1818

= Macropeza =

Genus of flies

Macropeza is a genus of flies belonging to the family Ceratopogonidae.

The species of this genus are found in Europe and Northern America.

Species:

- Macropeza abonnenci (Clastrier, 1958)
- Macropeza aethiopica (Ingram & Macfie, 1923)
