= Sphaeromiini =

Scientific classification
- Domain: Eukaryota
- Kingdom: Animalia
- Phylum: Arthropoda
- Class: Insecta
- Order: Diptera
- Family: Ceratopogonidae
- Subfamily: Ceratopogoninae
- Tribe: Sphaeromiini

Tribe of flies

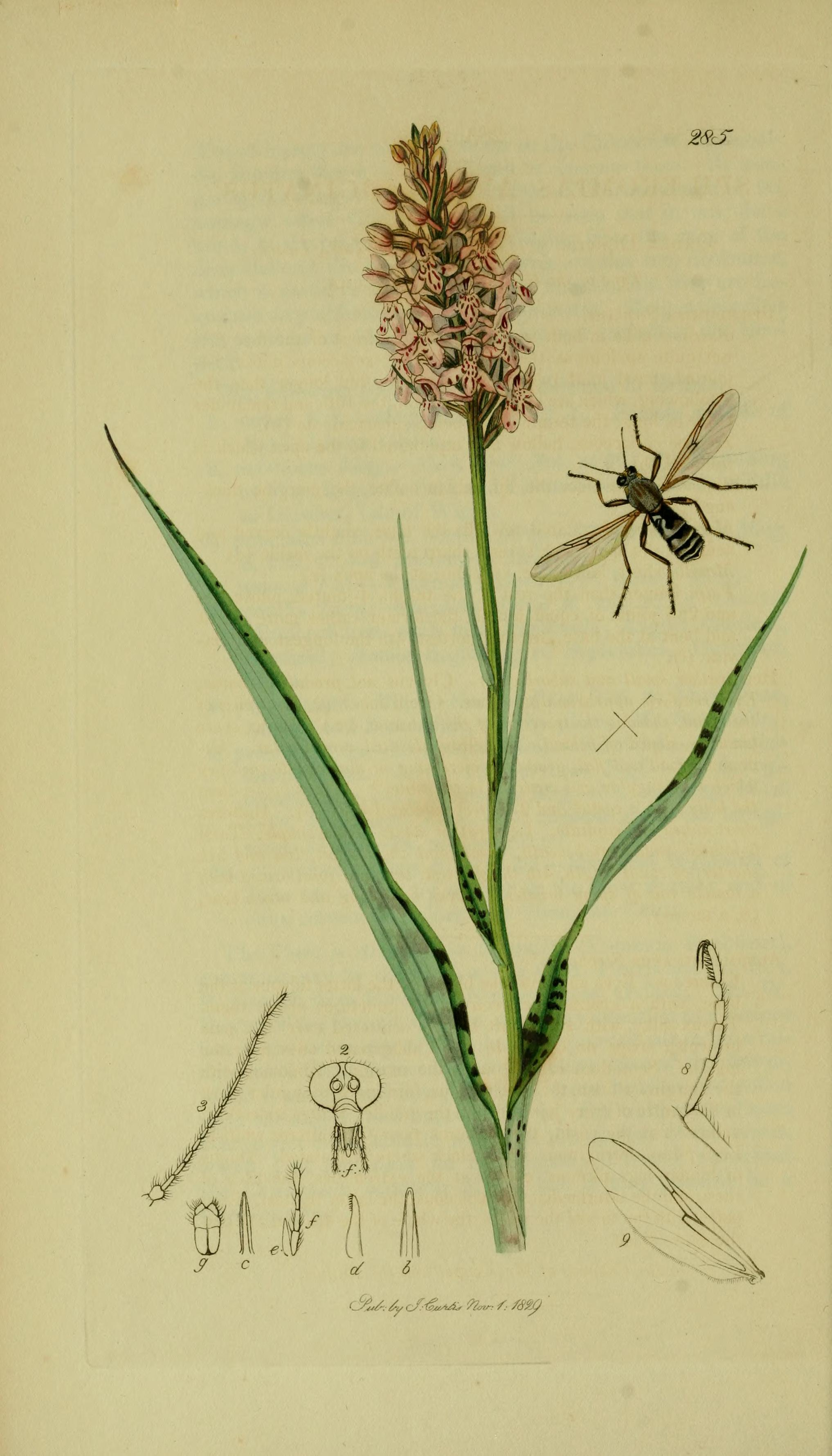
Sphaeromias albomarginatus = Sphaeromias fasciatus (White-bordered Sphaeromias).The plant is Dactylorhiza maculata (Spotted Orchis)

Sphaeromiini is a tribe of biting midges, insects in the family Ceratopogonidae. There are about 7 genera and at least 40 described species in Sphaeromiini.

== Genera ==
- Jenkinshelea Macfie, 1934
- Johannsenomyia Malloch, 1915
- Macropeza
- Mallochohelea Wirth, 1962
- Nilobezzia Kieffer, 1921
- Probezzia Kieffer, 1906
- Sphaeromias Curtis, 1928
