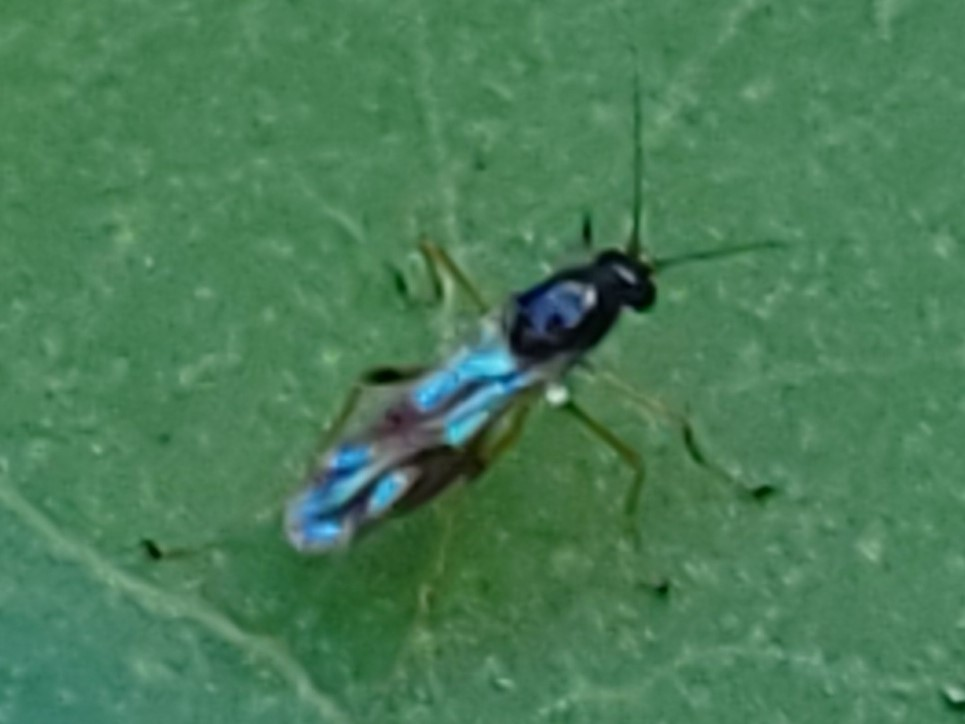

Scientific classification
- Kingdom: Animalia
- Phylum: Arthropoda
- Class: Insecta
- Order: Diptera
- Family: Ceratopogonidae
- Tribe: Heteromyiini
- Genus: Clinohelea
- Species: C. bimaculata

Binomial name
- Clinohelea bimaculata (Loew, 1861)

Synonyms
- Ceratopogon bimaculata Loew, 1861; Johannseniella bimaculata (Loew, 1861)

= Clinohelea bimaculata =

Species of fly

Clinohelea bimaculata is a species of biting midges in the family Ceratopogonidae from North America.
