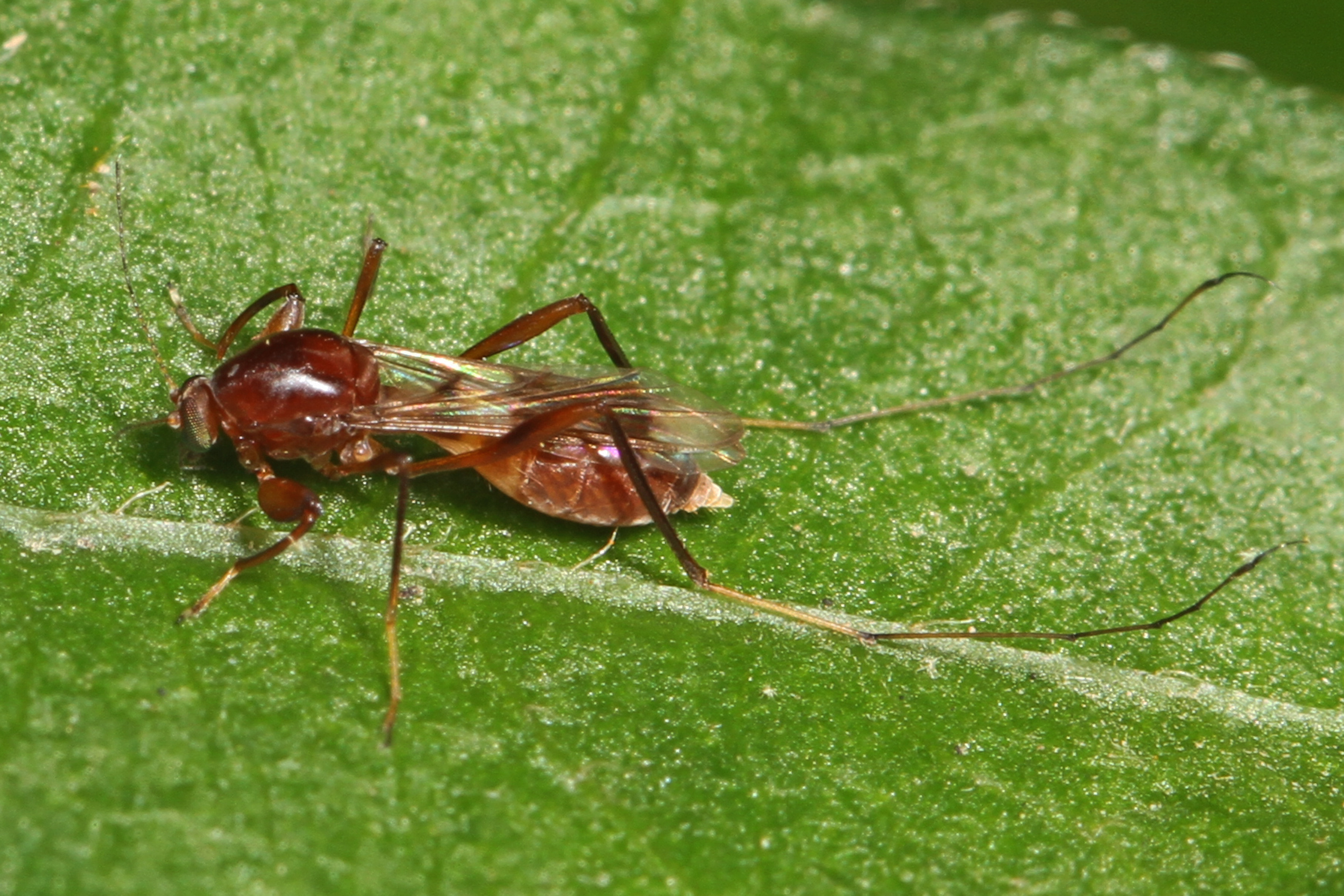

Scientific classification
- Kingdom: Animalia
- Phylum: Arthropoda
- Class: Insecta
- Order: Diptera
- Family: Ceratopogonidae
- Tribe: Heteromyiini
- Genus: Heteromyia
- Species: H. prattii

Binomial name
- Heteromyia prattii (Coquillett, 1902)

= Heteromyia prattii =

Species of fly

Heteromyia prattii is a species of biting midges in the family Ceratopogonidae from eastern North America.
