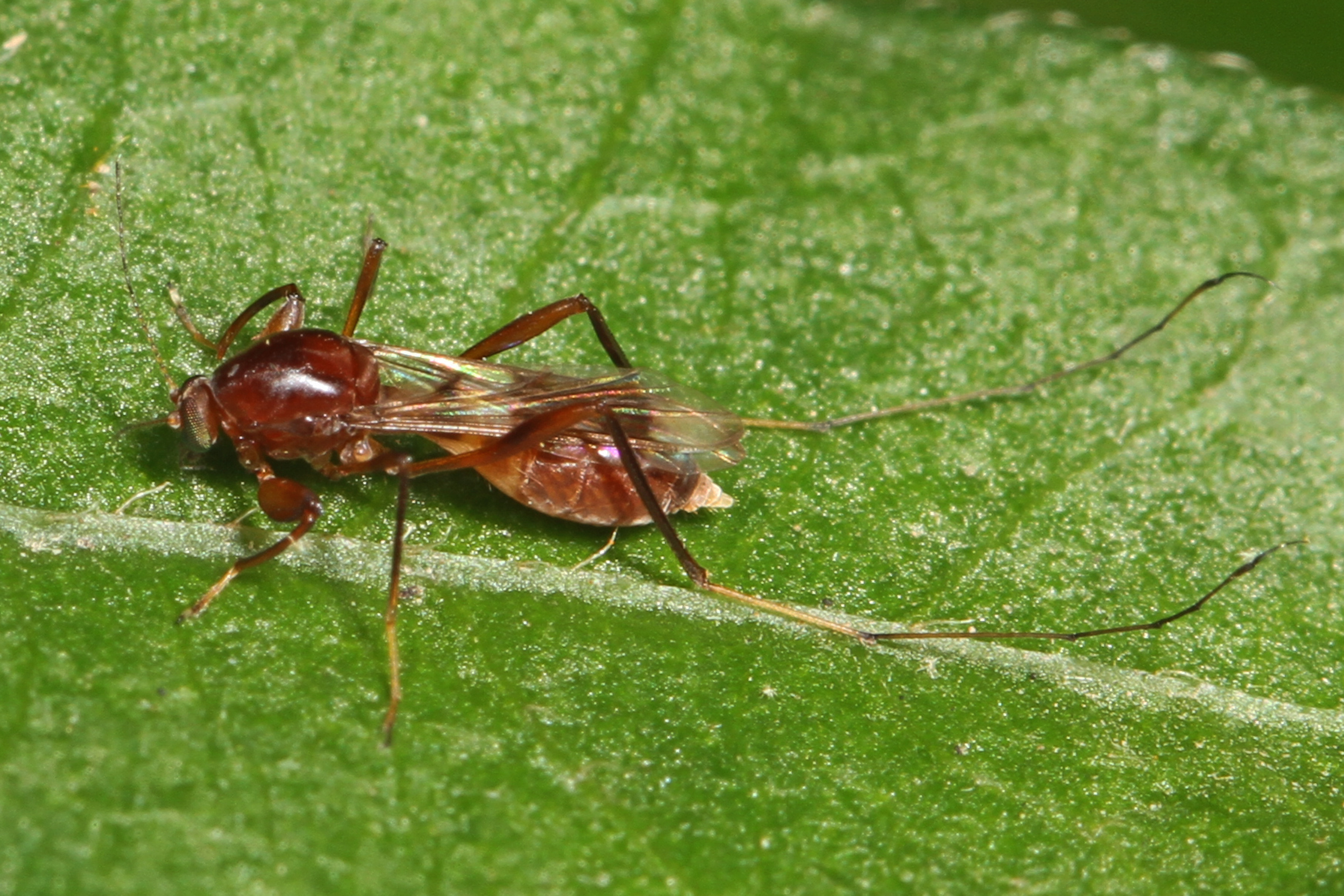
- Heteromyia prattii

Scientific classification
- Domain: Eukaryota
- Kingdom: Animalia
- Phylum: Arthropoda
- Class: Insecta
- Order: Diptera
- Family: Ceratopogonidae
- Subfamily: Ceratopogoninae
- Tribe: Heteromyiini
- Genus: Heteromyia; Say, 1825

Synonyms
- Pachyleptus Walker, 1864

= Heteromyia =

Genus of flies

Heteromyia is a genus of biting midges in the family Ceratopogonidae. There are about 17 described species in Heteromyia.

== Species ==
These 17 species belong to the genus Heteromyia:

- Heteromyia antequerae (Lynch Arribalzaga, 1893)
- Heteromyia bejaranoi Duret & Lane, 1955
- Heteromyia castaenea Lane, 1946
- Heteromyia chaquensis Duret & Lane, 1955
- Heteromyia clavata Williston, 1900
- Heteromyia correntina Duret & Lane, 1955
- Heteromyia dominicana Szadziewski & Grogan, 1997
- Heteromyia fasciata Say, 1825
- Heteromyia kiefferi Lane, 1946
- Heteromyia lamprogaster Edwards, 1933
- Heteromyia nigra Kieffer, 1917
- Heteromyia oedidactyla (Ingram & Macfie, 1931)
- Heteromyia orellana (Roback, 1957)
- Heteromyia prattii (Coquillett, 1902)
- Heteromyia rufa Kieffer, 1917
- Heteromyia turgidipes (Ingram & Macfie, 1931)
- Heteromyia wokei Wirth & Grogan
