= Clinohelea =

Scientific classification
- Domain: Eukaryota
- Kingdom: Animalia
- Phylum: Arthropoda
- Class: Insecta
- Order: Diptera
- Family: Ceratopogonidae
- Subfamily: Ceratopogoninae
- Tribe: Heteromyiini
- Genus: Clinohelea; Kieffer, 1917

Genus of flies

Clinohelea is a genus of biting midges in the family Ceratopogonidae. There are at least 40 described species in Clinohelea.

== Species ==
These 43 species belong to the genus Clinohelea:

- Clinohelea albopennis Lane, 1944^{c g}
- Clinohelea argentina Lane & Duret, 1954^{c g}
- Clinohelea barrettoi Lane & Duret, 1954^{c g}
- Clinohelea bimaculata (Loew, 1861)^{i c g b}
- Clinohelea bisignata (Kieffer, 1910)^{c}
- Clinohelea curriei (Coquillett, 1905)^{i c g} (=C. currei^{b})
- Clinohelea damascenoi Lane & Duret, 1954^{c g}
- Clinohelea dimidiata (Adams, 1903)^{i c g}
- Clinohelea dryas Debenham, 1974^{c g}
- Clinohelea fallax Kieffer, 1917^{c g}
- Clinohelea flagellata (Edwards, 1916)^{c g}
- Clinohelea fuscoalata Remm, 1993^{c g}
- Clinohelea hollandiae Tokunaga, 1966^{c g}
- Clinohelea horacioi Lane, 1944^{c g}
- Clinohelea hygropetrica Clastrier, 1983^{c g}
- Clinohelea insperata Meillon & Wirth, 1981^{c g}
- Clinohelea lacustris Macfie, 1939^{c g}
- Clinohelea longipalpis Kieffer, 1918^{c g}
- Clinohelea longitheca Grogan and Wirth, 1975^{i c g}
- Clinohelea muzoni Spinelli & Duret, 1993^{c g}
- Clinohelea neivai Lane, 1944^{c g}
- Clinohelea nigeriae Ingram & Macfie, 1923^{c g}
- Clinohelea nigripes Macfie, 1939^{c g}
- Clinohelea nubifera (Coquillett, 1905)^{i c g}
- Clinohelea pachydactyla Kieffer, 1918^{c g}
- Clinohelea papuensis Tokunaga, 1966^{c g}
- Clinohelea podagrica Goetghebuer, 1948^{c g}
- Clinohelea pseudonubifera Grogan and Wirth, 1975^{i c g}
- Clinohelea reperticia Yu & Zhang, 1996^{c g}
- Clinohelea rubriceps Kieffer, 1917^{c g}
- Clinohelea saltanensis Lane & Duret, 1954^{c g}
- Clinohelea tasmaniensis Lee, 1948^{c g}
- Clinohelea tenuipes Tokunaga, 1966^{c g}
- Clinohelea tenuissima (Kieffer, 1917)^{c g}
- Clinohelea townesi Lane, 1944^{c g}
- Clinohelea townsendi Lane, 1944^{c g}
- Clinohelea trimaculata Clastrier, 1983^{c g}
- Clinohelea unimaculata (Macquart, 1826)^{c g}
- Clinohelea usheri Meillon, 1959^{c g}
- Clinohelea usingeri Wirth, 1952^{i c g}
- Clinohelea variegatus (Winnertz)^{i}
- Clinohelea wygodzinskyi Lane, 1948^{c g}

Data sources: i = ITIS, c = Catalogue of Life, g = GBIF, b = Bugguide.net
