= Heteromyia fasciata =

Scientific classification
- Kingdom: Animalia
- Phylum: Arthropoda
- Class: Insecta
- Order: Diptera
- Family: Ceratopogonidae
- Genus: Heteromyia
- Species: H. fasciata

Binomial name
- Heteromyia fasciata Say, 1825

Synonyms
- Certatopogon festiva Lowe, 1861

Species of fly

Heteromyia fasciata is a species of biting midges in the family Ceratopogonidae from North America.
