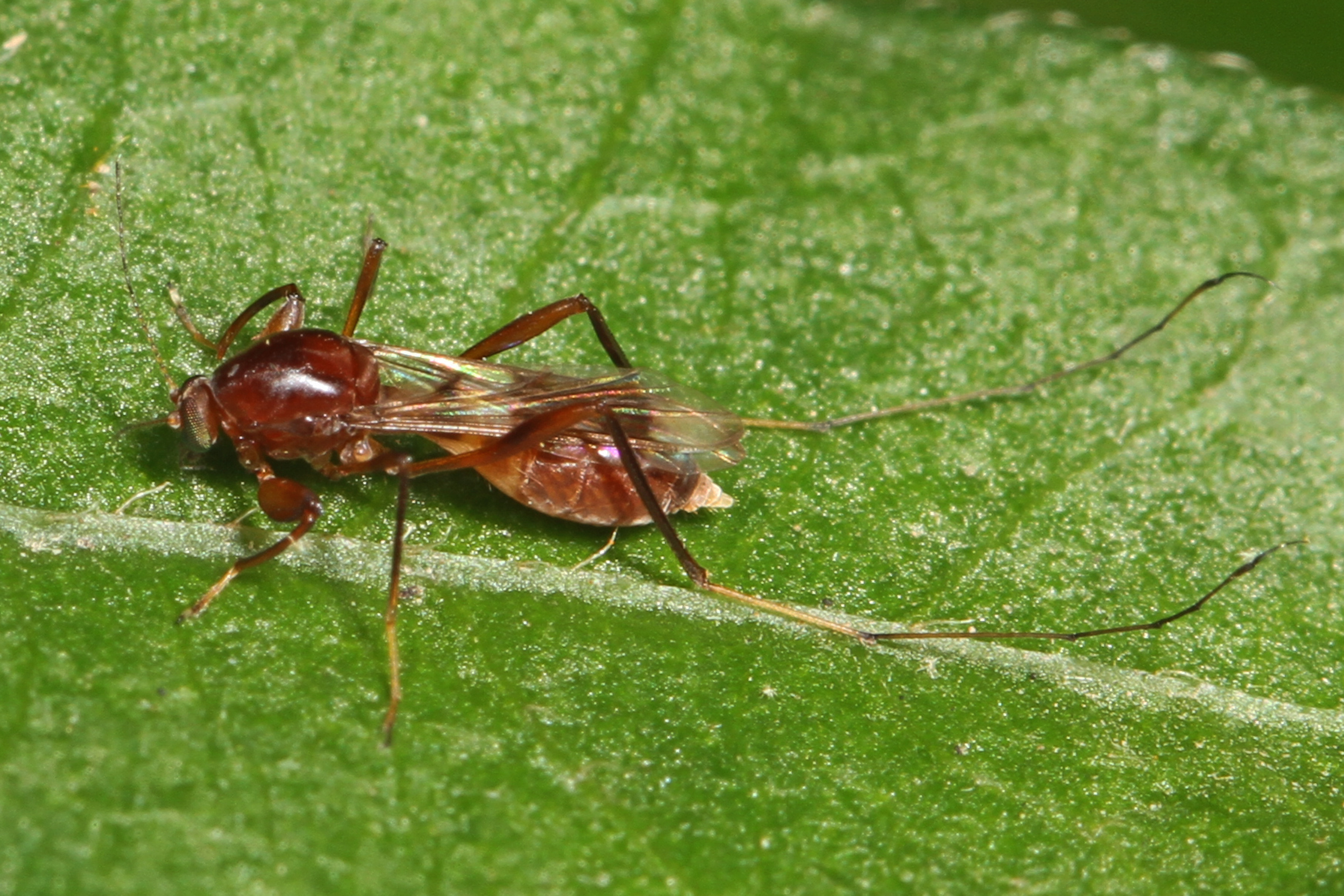
- Heteromyia prattii

Scientific classification
- Domain: Eukaryota
- Kingdom: Animalia
- Phylum: Arthropoda
- Class: Insecta
- Order: Diptera
- Family: Ceratopogonidae
- Subfamily: Ceratopogoninae
- Tribe: Heteromyiini

= Heteromyiini =

Tribe of flies

Heteromyiini is a tribe of biting midges in the family Ceratopogonidae. There are about 5 genera and 16 described species in Heteromyiini.

== Genera ==
These five genera belong to the tribe Heteromyiini:

- Clinohelea Kieffer, 1917^{i c g b}
- Heteromyia Say, 1825^{i c g b}
- Neurobezzia^{i c g}
- Neurohelea Kieffer, 1925^{i c g}
- Pellucidomyia^{i c g}

Data sources: i = ITIS, c = Catalogue of Life, g = GBIF, b = Bugguide.net
