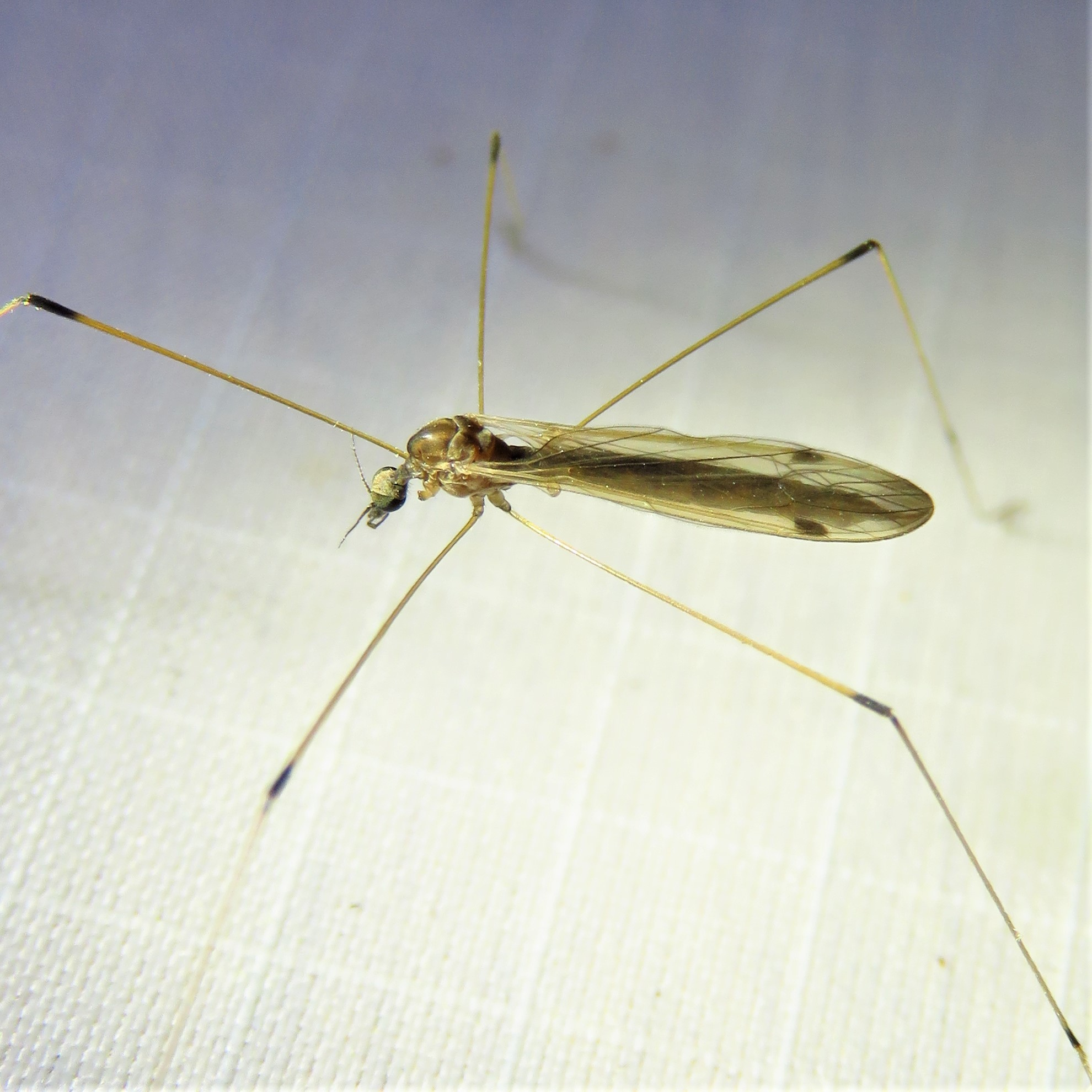
- Helius flavipes, Texas

Scientific classification
- Kingdom: Animalia
- Phylum: Arthropoda
- Class: Insecta
- Order: Diptera
- Family: Limoniidae
- Subfamily: Limoniinae; Speiser 1909

= Limoniinae =

Limoniinae Temporal range: Barremian–Present

Subfamily of flies

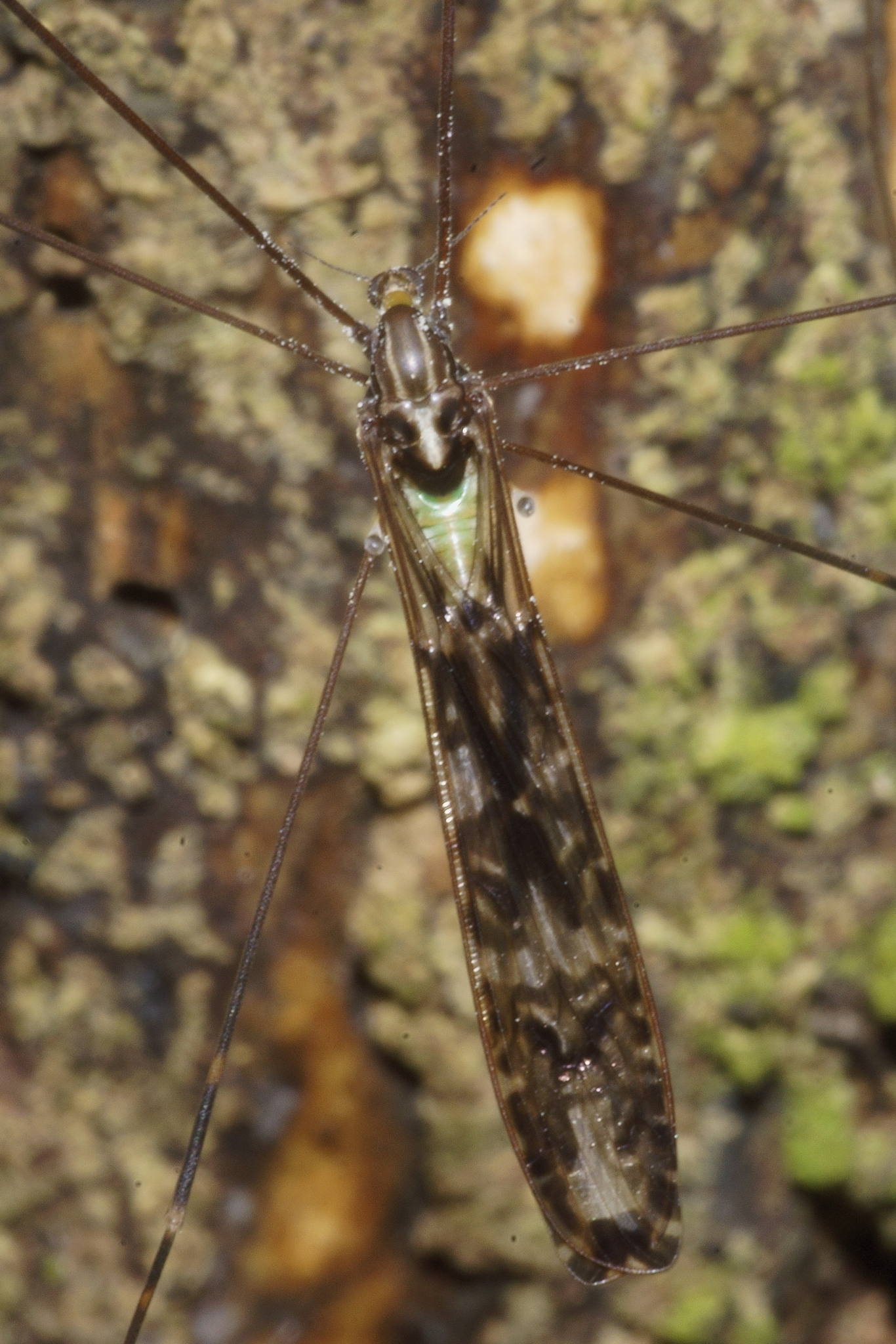
Discobola tessellata, New Zealand

Limoniinae is a subfamily of limoniid crane flies in the family Limoniidae. There are more than 30 genera and 3,700 described species in Limoniinae, found worldwide.

Like other Limoniid crane flies, most species in the Limoniinae subfamily rest with their wings folded along their body, instead of extended as with many large crane flies.

== Genera ==
These 38 genera belong to the subfamily Limoniinae:

- Achyrolimonia Alexander, 1965
- Amphilimnobia Alexander, 1920
- Antocha Osten Sacken, 1860
- Araucoxenia Alexander, 1969
- Atypophthalmus Brunetti, 1911
- Collessophila Theischinger, 1994
- Dapanoptera Westwood, 1881
- Degeneromyia Alexander, 1956
- Dicranomyia Stephens, 1829
- Dicranoptycha Osten Sacken, 1860
- Discobola Osten Sacken, 1865
- Elephantomyia Osten Sacken, 1860
- Elliptera Schiner, 1863
- Geranomyia Haliday, 1833
- Helius Lepeletier & Serville, 1828
- Lechria Skuse, 1890
- Libnotes Westwood, 1876
- Limnorimarga Alexander, 1945
- Limonia Meigen, 1803
- Lipsothrix Loew, 1873
- Metalimnobia Matsumura, 1911
- Neolimonia Alexander, 1964
- Orimarga Osten Sacken, 1869
- Orosmya Rondani, 1856
- Pelosia Rondani, 1856
- Platylimnobia Alexander, 1917
- Protohelius Alexander, 1928
- Rhipidia Meigen, 1818
- Spyloptera Rondani, 1856
- Taiwanina Alexander, 1928
- Thaumastoptera Mik, 1866
- Thrypticomyia Skuse, 1890
- Tipulina Motschulsky, 1859
- Tonnoiromyia Alexander, 1926
- Toxorhina Loew, 1850
- Trentepohlia Bigot, 1854
- Trichoneura Loew, 1850 (Silveus' grass)
- Xenolimnobia Alexander, 1926

== Ecology ==
Most larvae within the subfamily Limoniinae are saprophagous, developing in and feeding on decaying vegetation and associated microorganisms. However, certain lineages, including Limnophila and its relatives, are predatory or occasionally frugivorous. Larvae of Limoniinae occupy a range of ecological niches but are most commonly found in thin, flowing films of water enriched with algae.
