= R. maculata =

R. maculata may refer to:

- Racotis maculata, a geometer moth
- Rana maculata, a Central American frog
- Rasbora maculata, a ray-finned fish
- Restrepia maculata, an orchid endemic to western South America
- Rhipidia maculata, a crane fly
- Rhodocollybia maculata, a basidiomycete fungus
- Rhoicinaria maculata, a three-clawed spider
- Rhynchostele maculata, a New World plant
- Rimularia maculata, a lichenized fungus
- Rodriguezia maculata, an orchid endemic to Brazil
- Ropalidia maculata, a paper wasp
- Rutpela maculata, a flower longhorn
