= Discobola striata =

Scientific classification
- Kingdom: Animalia
- Phylum: Arthropoda
- Clade: Pancrustacea
- Class: Insecta
- Order: Diptera
- Superfamily: Tipuloidea
- Family: Limoniidae
- Subfamily: Limoniinae
- Genus: Discobola
- Species: D. striata

Binomial name
- Discobola striata Edwards, 1923

Synonyms
- Discobola picta (Hutton); Limonia (Discobola) pictoralis Alexander, 1929; Limonia (Discobola) striata (Edwards); Trochobola picta Hutton, 1900

Species of crane fly

Discobola striata is a species of crane fly in the family Limoniidae. Endemic to New Zealand, D. striata has to sub-species: D. striata striata, known to occur in the North Island, and D. striata chathamica, which is endemic to the Chatham Islands.

== Description ==
D. striata has a body length of between 9–12 mm (0.35–0.47 in) and a wing length of between 9–12 mm (0.35–0.47 in). The species is primarily brown in colour, with a maculate and spotted wing pattern, ranging in colour from sepia to purplish-brown.

The species can be distinguished from other New Zealand members of Discobola due to having an asymmetrical discal cell, with the anterior border being significantly longer than its posterior. D. striata chathamica can be identified due to having undifferentiated stigmal macula.

== Taxonomy ==
The species was first described by Frederick Wallace Edwards in 1923. D. striata is most closely related to D. venustula.

== Distribution and habitat ==
D. striata is endemic to New Zealand. D. striata striata is found in the North Island, while D. striata chathamica is found on the Chatham Islands.

== Gallery ==
Head

Body and wings
