= Dicranoptycha elsa =

Scientific classification
- Kingdom: Animalia
- Phylum: Arthropoda
- Class: Insecta
- Order: Diptera
- Family: Limoniidae
- Genus: Dicranoptycha
- Species: D. elsa

Binomial name
- Dicranoptycha elsa Alexander, 1929

Species of fly

Dicranoptycha elsa is a species of limoniid crane fly in the family Limoniidae.
