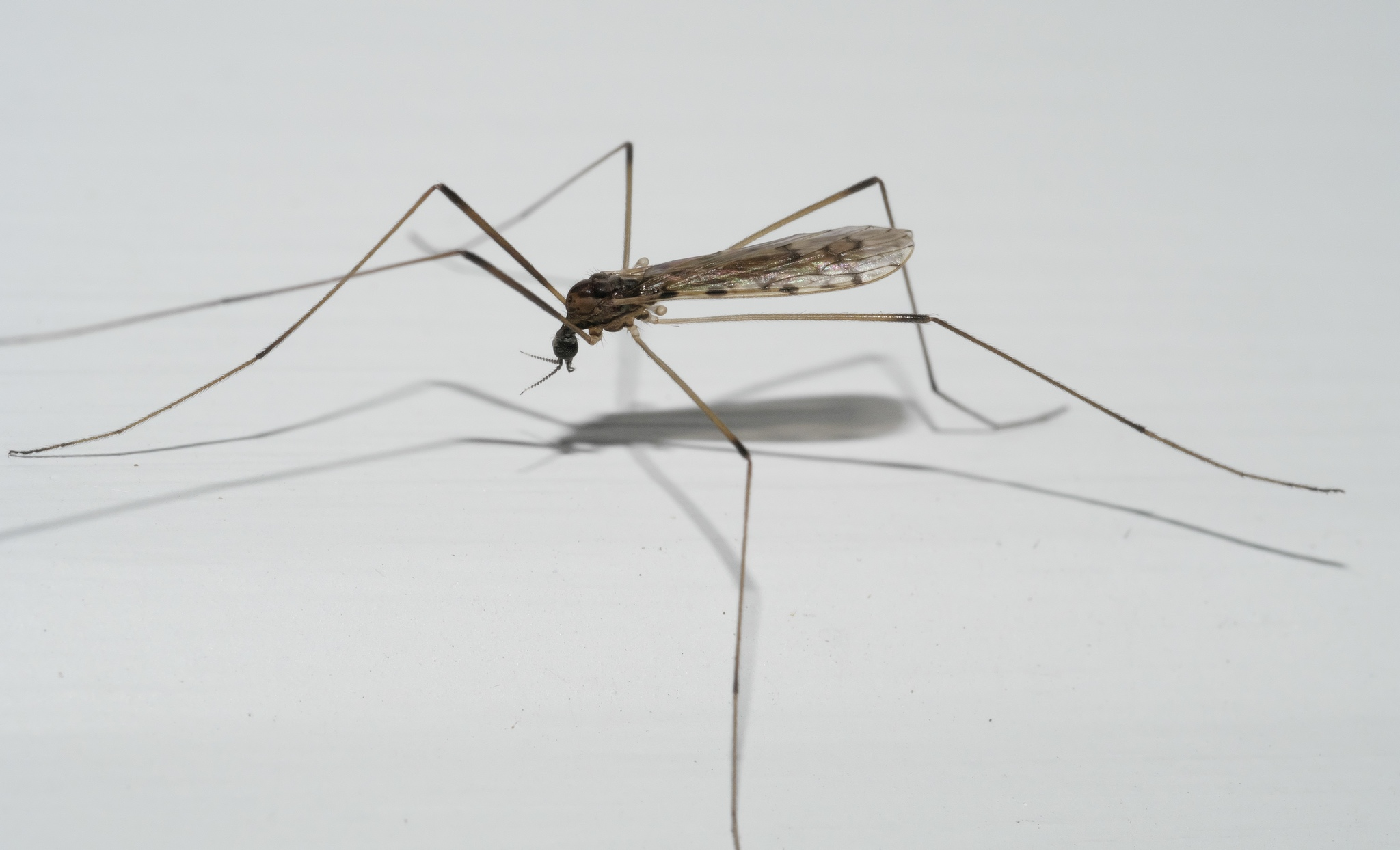
- Rhipidia domestica, Oklahoma

Scientific classification
- Kingdom: Animalia
- Phylum: Arthropoda
- Class: Insecta
- Order: Diptera
- Family: Limoniidae
- Subfamily: Limoniinae
- Genus: Rhipidia
- Species: R. domestica

Binomial name
- Rhipidia domestica Osten Sacken, 1860

= Rhipidia domestica =

Species of flies

Rhipidia domestica is a species of crane fly in the family Limoniidae. It is found in North, Central, and South America.

== Subspecies ==
These two subspecies belong to the species Rhipidia domestica:

- Rhipidia domestica amazonensis
- Rhipidia domestica domestica
