= Trentepohlia =

Trentepohlia may refer to:

- Trentepohlia (alga), a genus of algae in the family Trentepohliaceae
- Trentepohlia (fly), a genus of crane fly in the family Limoniidae
- Trentepohlia (plant), synonym for a genus of sedges, Cyperus
- Trentepohlia (plant), synonym for Heliophila, a genus of flowering plants native to southern Africa
