= Achyrolimonia =

- Achyrolimonia decemmaculata, ovipostion

Scientific classification
- Domain: Eukaryota
- Kingdom: Animalia
- Phylum: Arthropoda
- Class: Insecta
- Order: Diptera
- Family: Limoniidae
- Subfamily: Limoniinae
- Genus: Achyrolimonia; Alexander, 1965

Type species
- Limnobia trigonia Edwards, 1919

Species
- see text

Genus of flies

Achyrolimonia is a genus of crane fly in the family Limoniidae.

== Species ==
- A. alcestis (Alexander, 1978)
- A. atrichoptera (Alexander, 1930)
- A. basispina (Alexander, 1924)
- A. bequaerti (Alexander, 1930)
- A. bisalba (Alexander, 1961)
- A. brunneilata (Alexander, 1959)
- A. claggi (Alexander, 1931)
- A. coeiana (Nielsen, 1959)
- A. corinna (Alexander, 1951)
- A. cuthbertsoni (Alexander, 1934)
- A. decemmaculata (Loew, 1873)
- A. galactopoda (Alexander, 1961)
- A. holotricha (Alexander, 1926)
- A. immerens (Alexander, 1963)
- A. leucocnemis (Alexander, 1956)
- A. millotiana (Alexander, 1959)
- A. monacantha (Alexander, 1924)
- A. neonebulosa (Alexander, 1924)
- A. perarcuata (Alexander, 1976)
- A. persuffusa (Alexander, 1956)
- A. pothos (Alexander, 1957)
- A. potnia (Alexander, 1957)
- A. protrusa (Alexander, 1936)
- A. recedens (Alexander, 1920)
- A. recurvans (Alexander, 1919)
- A. saucroptera (Alexander, 1957)
- A. staneri (Alexander, 1956)
- A. synchaeta (Alexander, 1931)
- A. trichoptera (Alexander, 1920)
- A. trigonella (Alexander, 1932)
- A. trigonia (Edwards, 1919)
- A. trigonoides (Alexander, 1927)
- A. venustipennis (Alexander, 1921)
