= Dapanoptera =

Scientific classification
- Kingdom: Animalia
- Phylum: Arthropoda
- Class: Insecta
- Order: Diptera
- Family: Limoniidae
- Subfamily: Limoniinae
- Genus: Dapanoptera; Westwood, 1881

Type species
- Limnobia plenipennis Walker, 1865

Species
- See text

Genus of flies

Dapanoptera is a genus of crane fly in the family Limoniidae.

== Species ==
- D. auroatra (Walker, 1864)
- D. candidata (Alexander, 1942)
- D. carolina (Edwards, 1932)
- D. cermaki (Theischinger, 1996)
- D. fascipennis de Meijere, 1913
- D. gressittiana (Alexander, 1962)
- D. hipmilta (Theischinger, 1994)
- D. latifascia (Walker, 1865)
- D. meijereana (Alexander, 1942)
- D. percelestis (Alexander, 1959)
- D. perdecora (Walker, 1861)
- D. plenipennis (Walker, 1865)
- D. richmondiana Skuse, 1896
- D. torricelliana (Alexander, 1947)
- D. toxopaeana (Alexander, 1959)
- D. versteegi de Meijere, 1915
- D. virago (Alexander, 1959)
