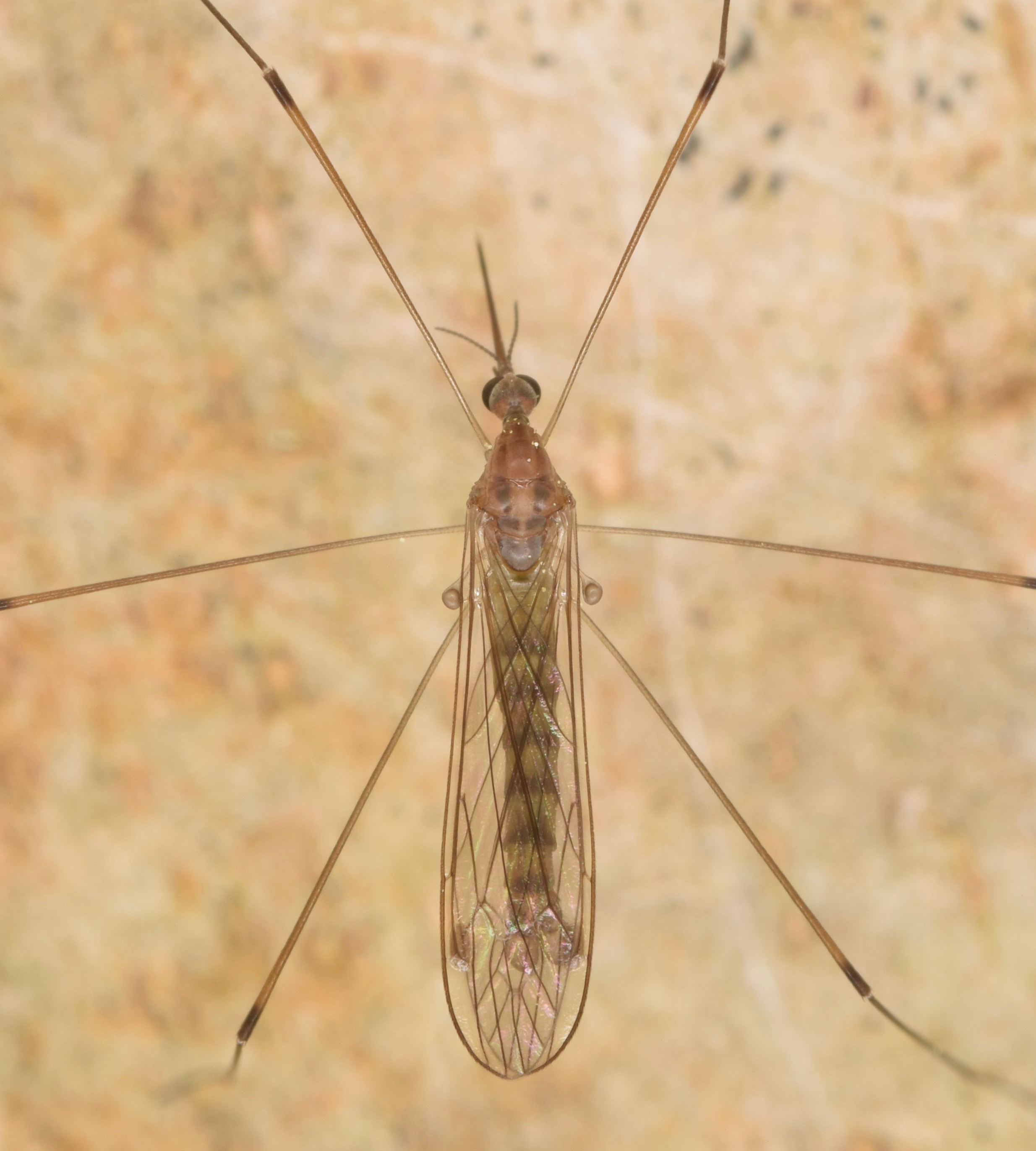
- Geranomyia communis

Scientific classification
- Kingdom: Animalia
- Phylum: Arthropoda
- Clade: Pancrustacea
- Class: Insecta
- Order: Diptera
- Family: Limoniidae
- Subfamily: Limoniinae
- Genus: Geranomyia; Haliday, 1833

Type species
- Geranomyia unicolor Haliday, 1833

Species
- See text

Synonyms
- Limnobiorhynchus Westwood, 1836; Aporosa Macquart, 1839; Pletussa Philippi, 1866; Triphana Skuse, 1890; Tetraphana Skuse, 1890; Monophana Edwards, 1912; Proaporosa Alexander, 1922; Pseudaporosa Alexander, 1924; Parageranomyia Santos Abreu, 1923

= Geranomyia =

Genus of flies

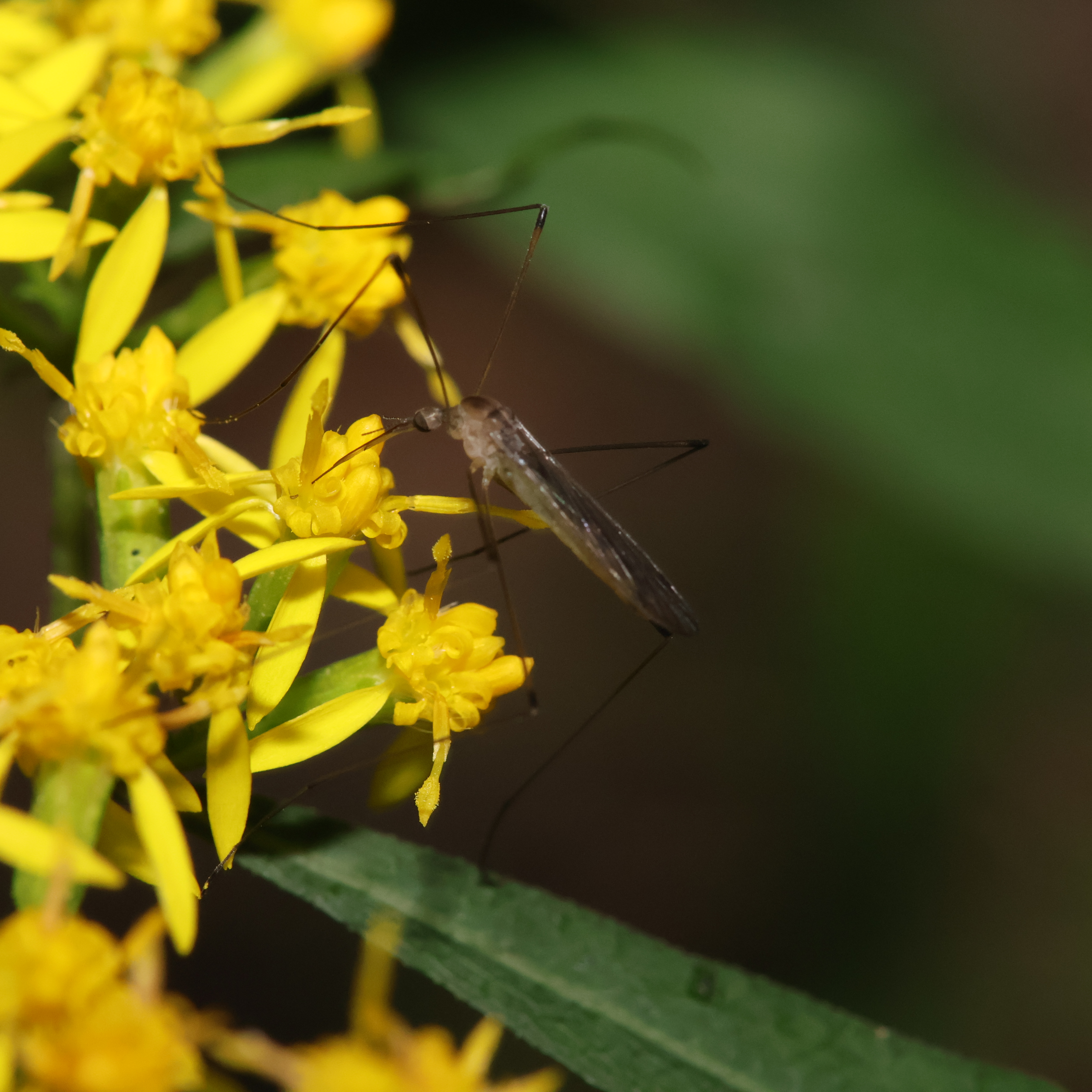
Geranomyia feeding on a goldenrod plant in the family, Solidago. Photo: M. Worth 2023

Geranomyia (Diptera: Limoniidae), nectar feeding crane flies, are a genus of crane fly in the family Limoniidae. The majority of Geranomyia species have been recorded from the southern hemisphere, however there are currently 356 described species from around the world. The neotropical region of the world provides some of the greatest species diversity with many species still unknown and undescribed. Larvae of Geranomyia can be found in aquatic or semi aquatic habitats, often on hygropetric habitats in streams and rivers. Adults are often found in a bobbing movement when feeding on nectar from composite flowers, yet the purpose of nectar feeding remains unknown.

Geranomyia crane flies occur in the family Limoniidae, which is in the superfamily Tipuloidea, along with the other three families of crane flies: Tipulidae, Pediciidae, and Cylindrotomidae. Crane fly taxonomy has changed in more recent years, as historically, there was a single family of crane flies (Tipulidae), with three subfamilies: Tipulinae, Cylindrotominae, and Limoniinae. Phylogenetic analyses led to the four family approach, which most researchers follow today.

Geranomyia crane flies are most well recognized for their elongate mouthparts used in nectar feeding. Mouthpart lengths are often greater than half the length of the body, typically dark in color. Geranomyia are typically small to medium in size (4-10 mm) with bodies brown or green in life. Wings tend to have a stigma present along the costal vein and heads tend to be gray or charcoal colored.

Life cycle and behavior: Adult Geranomyia usually emerge in early spring and typically have a rather long period of active feeding, from April until October. When feeding or at rest, they engage in a bouncing or bobbing movement, which is specific to only Geranomyia, and the function of the behavior is unknown. Larvae tend to be similar to many other limoniids, as they are semi-aquatic and form silken, gelatinous tubes with algal filaments which they feed upon. In pupation, they form a cocoon-like sheath in the mouth of the larval tube. One species, Geranomyia recondita (Alexander 1921), develops a globular mass made of a clear jelly-like substance on leaves. The larvae are protected within the jelly mass and feed on epiphyllous [W1] liverworts. This larval habitat forming behavior is specific to Geranomyia.

Habitat: Geranomyia larvae are found in aquatic and semi-aquatic habitats. Most commonly, they can be found in hygropetric habitats, where a thin film of water is flowing constantly over a rock surface and there is also algae present on the rock. This type of habitat is most common in streams and waterfalls, but Geranomyia can be found in rivers as well. Adults are typically found close to their larval habitats, near riffles in streams but also on limestone cliffs and overhanging springs. More specifically, adults are found feeding near their larval habitats, resting and feeding on Asteraceae flowers such as Aster, Eupatorium, Helianthus, Solidago, and Verbesina.

Historic and current distribution: Geranomyia crane flies are globally distributed in the Holarctic, Palaearctic, Nearctic, Neotropical, Oriental, Afrotropical, and Australasian regions. The greatest diversity occurs in the neotropical regions. The Neotropics are also thought to have the greatest amount of undescribed species. One species, Geranomyia guatemalensis is historically found in Costa Rica, Guatemala, Mexico and Venezuela, however, in recent years it has been found in Pennsylvania and New York, demonstrating a range expansion. The distribution of most species of Geranomyia is poorly known in terms of expansions, yet with increasing temperatures it is thought that many species might be expanding their ranges.

== Species ==
- G. ablusa (Alexander, 1967)
- G. advena (Alexander, 1954)
- G. aequabilis aequabilis Alexander, 1923
- G. aequabilis deplexa (Alexander, 1941)
- G. aeruginosa (Alexander, 1972)
- G. alberticola (Alexander, 1956)
- G. albilabris (Edwards, 1931)
- G. alpestris (Alexander, 1930)
- G. amblytylos (Alexander, 1964)
- G. amoenalis (Alexander, 1945)
- G. anduzeana (Alexander, 1943)
- G. aneura (Alexander, 1971)
- G. anisacantha (Alexander, 1964)
- G. annandalei Edwards, 1913
- G. annulosa (Alexander, 1929)
- G. anthina (Alexander, 1945)
- G. antillarum (Alexander, 1930)
- G. apicifasciata (Alexander, 1930)
- G. arecuna (Alexander, 1931)
- G. argentacea (Alexander, 1980)
- G. argentifera de Meijere, 1911
- G. argentinensis Alexander, 1920
- G. assueta (Alexander, 1943)
- G. atlantica (Wollaston, 1858)
- G. atrostriata Edwards, 1921
- G. atychia (Alexander, 1964)
- G. austroandina (Alexander, 1929)
- G. austropicta (Alexander, 1929)
- G. avara (Alexander, 1944)
- G. avocetta Alexander, 1913
- G. bahiensis (Alexander, 1930)
- G. baliana (Alexander, 1934)
- G. bancrofti Alexander, 1922
- G. banksiana (Alexander, 1939)
- G. beatrix (Alexander, 1945)
- G. bezzii Alexander & Leonard, 1912
- G. biargentata (Alexander, 1930)
- G. bicincta Alexander, 1921
- G. bifidaria (Alexander, 1931)
- G. bifurcula (Alexander, 1933)
- G. bivittata Becker, 1908
- G. bogongicola (Alexander, 1930)
- G. boki (Alexander, 1975)
- G. brasiliensis (Westwood, 1836)
- G. brevibasis (Alexander, 1972)
- G. brevispinula (Alexander, 1930)
- G. brunnescens de Meijere, 1916
- G. bustilloi (Alexander, 1938)
- G. callinota (Alexander, 1941)
- G. caloptera Mik, 1867
- G. canadensis (Westwood, 1836)
- G. canariensis Bergroth, 1889
- G. caribica (Alexander, 1970)
- G. carunculata (Alexander, 1941)
- G. cerberus Alexander, 1927
- G. cernua (Alexander, 1942)
- G. certhia Alexander, 1916
- G. cinereinota Alexander, 1913
- G. circipunctata Brunetti, 1912
- G. cocoensis (Alexander, 1978)
- G. commogastra (Alexander, 1967)
- G. communis Osten Sacken, 1860
- G. conjurata (Alexander, 1937)
- G. conjuratoides (Alexander, 1945)
- G. conquisita (Alexander, 1941)
- G. contorta (Alexander, 1941)
- G. contrita (Alexander, 1937)
- G. cornigera Alexander, 1913
- G. costaricensis Alexander, 1916
- G. costomaculata Dietz, 1921
- G. costosetosa (Alexander, 1956)
- G. cubana (Alexander, 1930)
- G. damicoi (Alexander, 1942)
- G. deccanica (Alexander, 1968)
- G. deleta (Alexander, 1937)
- G. deliciosa (Alexander, 1934)
- G. destricta (Alexander, 1940)
- G. devota (Alexander, 1929)
- G. diabolica (Alexander, 1944)
- G. diargyria (Alexander, 1941)
- G. dicranostyla (Alexander, 1964)
- G. dischidia (Alexander, 1958)
- G. discors (Alexander, 1980)
- G. disparilis (Alexander, 1946)
- G. distincta Doane, 1900
- G. diversa Osten Sacken, 1860
- G. dominicana (Alexander, 1939)
- G. durga (Alexander, 1967)
- G. dybasi (Alexander, 1972)
- G. edwardsella (Alexander, 1967)
- G. edwardsiana (Alexander & Alexander, 1973)
- G. enderleini Alexander, 1913
- G. entmema (Alexander, 1978)
- G. erasmi (Alexander, 1933)
- G. eremnopoda (Alexander, 1975)
- G. errana (Alexander, 1930)
- G. eurygramma Alexander, 1928
- G. euryphallus (Alexander, 1960)
- G. feuerborni (Alexander, 1931)
- G. fimbriacosta (Alexander, 1961)
- G. fimbriarum (Alexander, 1949)
- G. flavicosta Brunetti, 1912
- G. flavitarsis Edwards, 1928
- G. flaviventris Brunetti, 1918
- G. fletcheri Edwards, 1911
- G. fluxa (Alexander, 1941)
- G. forsteriana (Alexander, 1962)
- G. fortibasis (Alexander, 1942)
- G. fremida (Alexander, 1937)
- G. fumimarginata (Alexander, 1936)
- G. furor (Alexander, 1944)
- G. fuscana (Macquart, 1838)
- G. ganesa (Alexander, 1960)
- G. gaudens Alexander, 1922
- G. genitaloides Senior-White, 1924
- G. gifuensis Alexander, 1921
- G. glauca Alexander, 1916
- G. gracilipalpis (Alexander, 1956)
- G. gracilispinosa (Alexander, 1937)
- G. grampianicola (Alexander, 1930)
- G. gravelyana (Alexander, 1942)
- G. griseipeltata (Alexander, 1956)
- G. grus (Alexander, 1933)
- G. guatemalensis Alexander, 1916
- G. guianensis (Alexander, 1930)
- G. hakoneana (Alexander, 1955)
- G. hardyi Alexander, 1928
- G. hedosyne (Alexander, 1961)
- G. heteroxipha (Alexander, 1942)
- G. hirsutinota (Alexander, 1943)
- G. hirudinis (Alexander, 1967)
- G. ibis Alexander, 1916
- G. idiopygialis (Alexander, 1980)
- G. immerita (Alexander, 1930)
- G. immobilis (Alexander, 1932)
- G. inaequispinosa (Alexander, 1940)
- G. inaequituberculata (Alexander, 1930)
- G. infamosa (Alexander, 1937)
- G. innoxia (Alexander, 1968)
- G. inornata Lackschewitz, 1928
- G. inquisita (Alexander, 1942)
- G. insignis (Loew, 1851)
- G. intermedia (Walker, 1848)
- G. irrorata Séguy, 1938
- G. javanica Alexander, 1915
- G. kiangsiana (Alexander, 1937)
- G. knabiana Alexander, 1916
- G. lachrymalis Alexander, 1916
- G. lacteitarsis Alexander, 1922
- G. lampronota (Edwards, 1932)
- G. latitudinis (Alexander, 1954)
- G. laudanda (Alexander, 1938)
- G. lemniscata (Alexander, 1930)
- G. lichyi (Alexander, 1943)
- G. linearis Alexander, 1915
- G. lineata Enderlein, 1912
- G. longicrinita (Alexander, 1973)
- G. longifimbriata (Alexander, 1931)
- G. luteimana (Alexander, 1938)
- G. luteinota (Alexander, 1956)
- G. lutulenta Skuse, 1890
- G. lycaon (Alexander, 1953)
- G. macrauchenia (Alexander, 1957)
- G. macrops Alexander, 1919
- G. macta (Alexander, 1945)
- G. malabarensis (Alexander, 1952)
- G. manca Alexander, 1924
- G. marthae (Alexander, 1930)
- G. mashonica Alexander, 1920
- G. melanocephala Edwards, 1926
- G. melanomera (Alexander, 1980)
- G. melanoxyna (Alexander, 1975)
- G. memnonia (Alexander, 1961)
- G. meracula (Alexander, 1936)
- G. mexicana (Bellardi, 1861)
- G. microphaea (Alexander, 1939)
- G. militaris (Alexander, 1953)
- G. monorhaphidia (Alexander, 1971)
- G. montana de Meijere, 1911
- G. multicolor (Alexander, 1966)
- G. multipuncta Alexander, 1922
- G. myersiana (Alexander, 1930)
- G. neanthina (Alexander, 1955)
- G. neavocetta (Alexander, 1938)
- G. neogaudens (Alexander, 1942)
- G. neonumenius (Alexander, 1930)
- G. neoparilis (Alexander, 1962)
- G. neopentheres (Alexander, 1930)
- G. neopicta (Alexander, 1978)
- G. neptis (Alexander, 1970)
- G. nigripleura Alexander, 1919
- G. nigronitida Alexander, 1921
- G. nigronotata Brunetti, 1918
- G. nigropaxilla (Alexander, 1974)
- G. nigropeltata (Alexander, 1956)
- G. nitida de Meijere, 1911
- G. notatipennis Brunetti, 1913
- G. nugatoria (Alexander, 1943)
- G. numenius Alexander, 1913
- G. obesistyla (Alexander, 1940)
- G. obscura Strobl, 1900
- G. obsolescens (Alexander, 1956)
- G. offirmata (Alexander, 1936)
- G. oneris (Alexander, 1957)
- G. opinator (Alexander, 1950)
- G. opulens (Alexander, 1946)
- G. ornatrix Alexander, 1926
- G. orthorhabda (Alexander, 1940)
- G. palauensis (Alexander, 1972)
- G. pallidapex (Alexander, 1946)
- G. paramanca (Alexander, 1931)
- G. parapentheres (Alexander, 1948)
- G. parilis (Alexander, 1946)
- G. pastazina (Alexander, 1944)
- G. pentheres Alexander, 1928
- G. penthoptera Alexander, 1924
- G. perfecta Alexander, 1928
- G. pergracilis (Alexander, 1980)
- G. phoenaspis (Alexander, 1930)
- G. phoenosoma (Alexander, 1931)
- G. pictorum (Alexander, 1929)
- G. picturella (Alexander, 1978)
- G. platensis Alexander, 1923
- G. pleuropalloris (Alexander, 1931)
- G. plumbeicolor (Alexander, 1938)
- G. plumbeipleura Alexander, 1916
- G. podomelania (Alexander, 1981)
- G. poliophara Alexander, 1927
- G. procax (Alexander, 1960)
- G. productella (Alexander, 1975)
- G. propera (Alexander, 1949)
- G. provocator (Alexander, 1941)
- G. quinquelineata (Alexander, 1980)
- G. rabula (Alexander, 1940)
- G. radialis (Alexander, 1930)
- G. recisa Alexander, 1927
- G. recondita Alexander, 1921
- G. refuga (Alexander, 1944)
- G. relata (Alexander, 1944)
- G. risibilis Alexander, 1928
- G. rostrata (Say, 1823)
- G. rubiginosa (Alexander, 1931)
- G. rubrithorax Alexander, 1921
- G. rudebecki (Alexander, 1964)
- G. rufescens (Loew, 1851)
- G. sagittifer Alexander, 1921
- G. sakaguchii Alexander, 1924
- G. sakalava (Alexander, 1961)
- G. samoana Edwards, 1928
- G. satipoana (Alexander, 1945)
- G. scolopax Alexander, 1913
- G. semifasciata Brunetti, 1911
- G. semistriata Brunetti, 1911
- G. separata Alexander, 1921
- G. septemnotata Edwards, 1916
- G. serotina Alexander, 1923
- G. sexocellata Alexander, 1921
- G. skuseana (Alexander, 1929)
- G. snyderi (Alexander, 1972)
- G. sorbillans (Wiedemann, 1828)
- G. spangleri (Alexander, 1970)
- G. sparsiguttata (Alexander, 1937)
- G. spectata (Alexander, 1937)
- G. stenoleuca (Alexander, 1957)
- G. stenophallus (Alexander, 1944)
- G. stoica (Alexander, 1941)
- G. stylobtusa (Alexander, 1967)
- G. subgaudens (Alexander, 1941)
- G. subimmaculata Alexander, 1921
- G. subinsignis Alexander, 1916
- G. subparilis (Alexander, 1962)
- G. subpentheres (Alexander, 1943)
- G. subradialis (Alexander, 1937)
- G. subrecisa (Alexander, 1933)
- G. subserotina Alexander, 1921
- G. subvirescens (Alexander, 1930)
- G. suensoniana (Alexander, 1929)
- G. sumptuosa (Alexander, 1942)
- G. syamantaka (Alexander, 1963)
- G. sylvania (Alexander, 1939)
- G. synaporosa Speiser, 1913
- G. taleola (Alexander, 1974)
- G. tanytrichiata (Alexander, 1961)
- G. tatei (Alexander, 1931)
- G. tenebricosa Alexander, 1928
- G. tenuispinosa (Alexander, 1929)
- G. terpsis (Alexander, 1980)
- G. tibialis (Loew, 1851)
- G. timens (Alexander, 1950)
- G. tonnoiri Alexander, 1928
- G. torta (Alexander, 1938)
- G. townsendi Alexander, 1916
- G. toxeres (Alexander, 1974)
- G. transitoria (Alexander, 1941)
- G. trichomera (Alexander, 1939)
- G. tridens Brunetti, 1912
- G. tristella (Alexander, 1929)
- G. tugela (Alexander, 1964)
- G. tulumayoensis (Alexander, 1944)
- G. tumidibasis (Alexander, 1938)
- G. turbida Alexander, 1928
- G. uberis (Alexander, 1939)
- G. umbricolor (Alexander, 1937)
- G. unicolor Haliday, 1833
- G. unifilosa (Alexander, 1934)
- G. unispinifera (Alexander, 1938)
- G. valida (Loew, 1851)
- G. valverdensis (Alexander, 1946)
- G. vanduzeei Alexander, 1916
- G. vanikorensis (Alexander, 1934)
- G. variegata (Walker, 1837)
- G. versuta (Alexander, 1930)
- G. victoriae Alexander, 1928
- G. villaricensis (Alexander, 1930)
- G. vinaceobrunnea Brunetti, 1911
- G. vindicta (Alexander, 1943)
- G. virescens (Loew, 1851)
- G. viridella (Alexander, 1930)
- G. viriditincta (Alexander, 1980)
- G. vitiella (Alexander, 1956)
- G. walkeri (Alexander, 1930)
- G. wigginsi (Alexander, 1978)
- G. xanthoplaca Alexander, 1921
- G. yunquensis (Alexander, 1957)
- G. zionana (Alexander, 1948)
