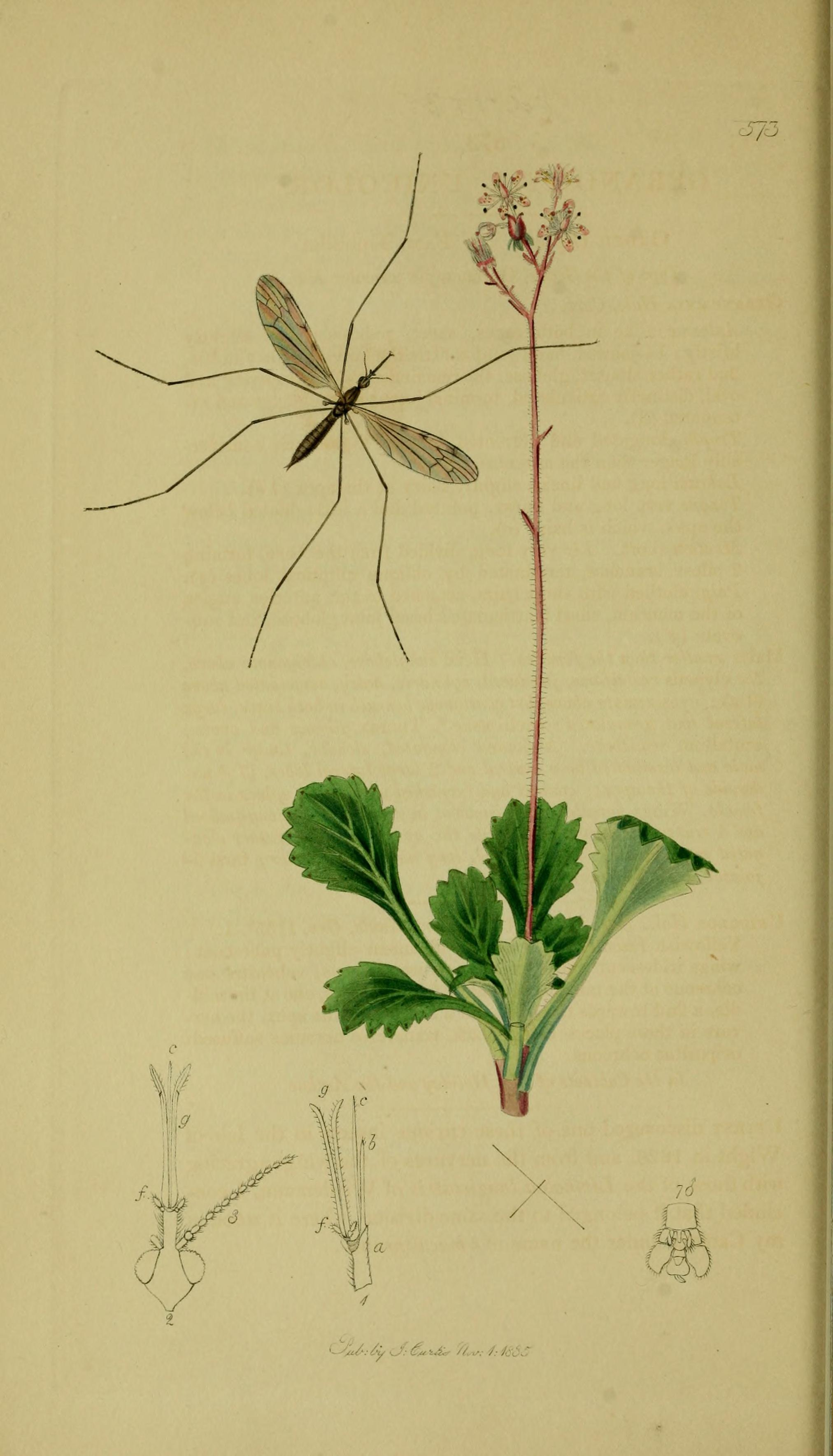
- Geranomyia unicolor in British Entomology

Scientific classification
- Kingdom: Animalia
- Phylum: Arthropoda
- Class: Insecta
- Order: Diptera
- Family: Limoniidae
- Genus: Geranomyia
- Species: G. unicolor

Binomial name
- Geranomyia unicolor (Haliday, 1833)

= Geranomyia unicolor =

Species of fly

Geranomyia unicolor is a species of crane fly in the family Limoniidae. A coastal species, its larvae feed on green algae and lichens in the high tidal zone and splash zone.
