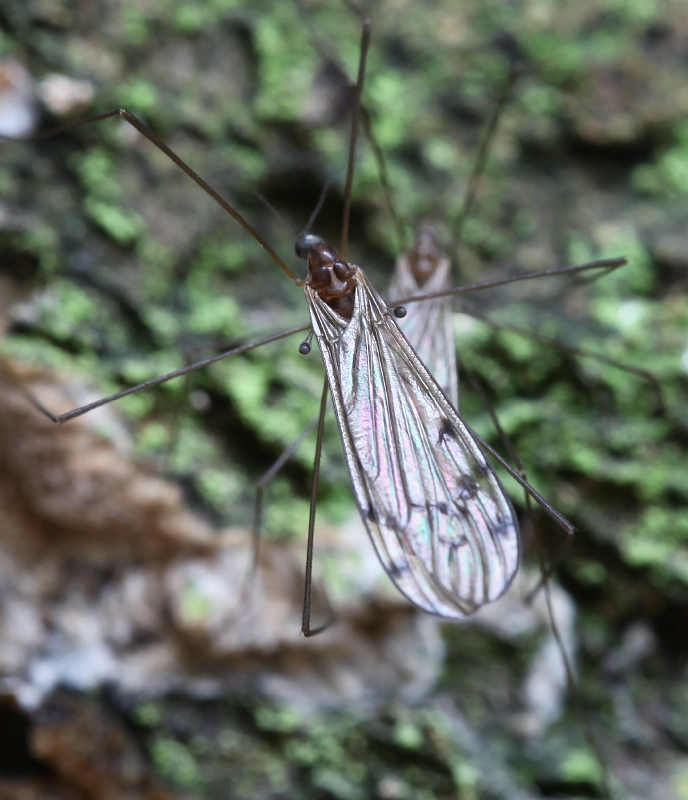
- Achyrolimonia decemmaculata Netherlands

Scientific classification
- Kingdom: Animalia
- Phylum: Arthropoda
- Class: Insecta
- Order: Diptera
- Family: Limoniidae
- Genus: Achyrolimonia
- Species: A. decemmaculata

Binomial name
- Achyrolimonia decemmaculata Loew, 1873

= Achyrolimonia decemmaculata =

Species of fly

Achyrolimonia decemmaculata is a Palearctic species of cranefly in the family Limoniidae.It is found in a wide range of habitats and micro habitats: in earth rich in humus, in swamps and marshes, in leaf litter and in wet spots in woods.
