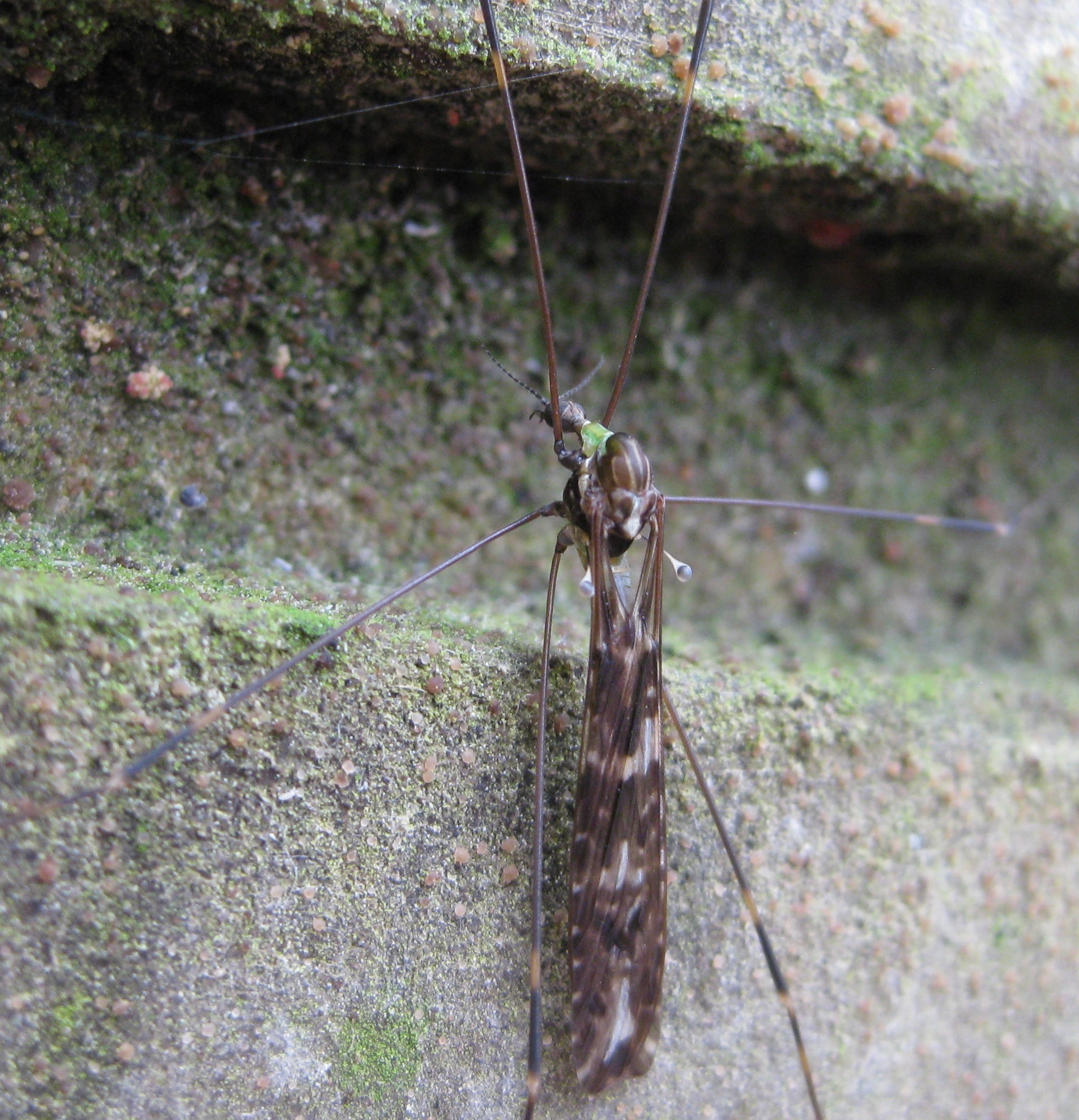
- Discobola dohrni

Scientific classification
- Kingdom: Animalia
- Phylum: Arthropoda
- Class: Insecta
- Order: Diptera
- Family: Limoniidae
- Subfamily: Limoniinae
- Genus: Discobola; Osten Sacken, 1865

Type species
- Limnobia argus Say, 1824 [= annulata (Linnaeus, 1758)]

Species
- See text

= Discobola =

Genus of flies

Discobola is a genus of crane fly in the family Limoniidae.

== Description ==
Discobola specimens are recognized by their extensively maculate (blotched) or ocellate (spotted) wing markings, by the presence of an A1 cross vein on the wings, and by spined or pectinate (comb like) claws. Specimens from New Zealand are distinctive from those of other locations in having slightly different male genitalia.

== Distribution ==
New Zealand, Australia & Chile.

== Species ==
- D. acurostris (Alexander, 1943)
- D. annulata (Linnaeus, 1758)
- D. armorica (Alexander, 1942)
- D. australis (Skuse, 1890)
- D. boninensis (Alexander, 1972)
- D. caesarea (Osten Sacken, 1854)
- D. calamites (Alexander, 1959)
- D. caledoniae (Alexander, 1948)
- D. dicycla Edwards, 1923
- D. dohrni (Osten Sacken, 1894)
- D. epiphragmoides (Edwards, 1933)
- D. euthenia (Alexander, 1958)
- D. freyana (Nielsen, 1961)
- D. fumihalterata (Alexander, 1955)
- D. gibberina (Alexander, 1948)
- D. gowdeyi (Alexander, 1933)
- D. haetara Johns and Jenner, 2006
- D. margarita Alexander, 1924
- D. moiwana Alexander, 1924
- D. neoelegans (Alexander, 1954)
- D. nigroclavata (Alexander, 1943)
- D. parargus (Edwards, 1933)
- D. parvispinula (Alexander, 1947)
- D. striata Edwards, 1923
- D. taivanella (Alexander, 1930)
- D. tessellata (Osten Sacken, 1894)
- D. venustula (Alexander, 1929)
