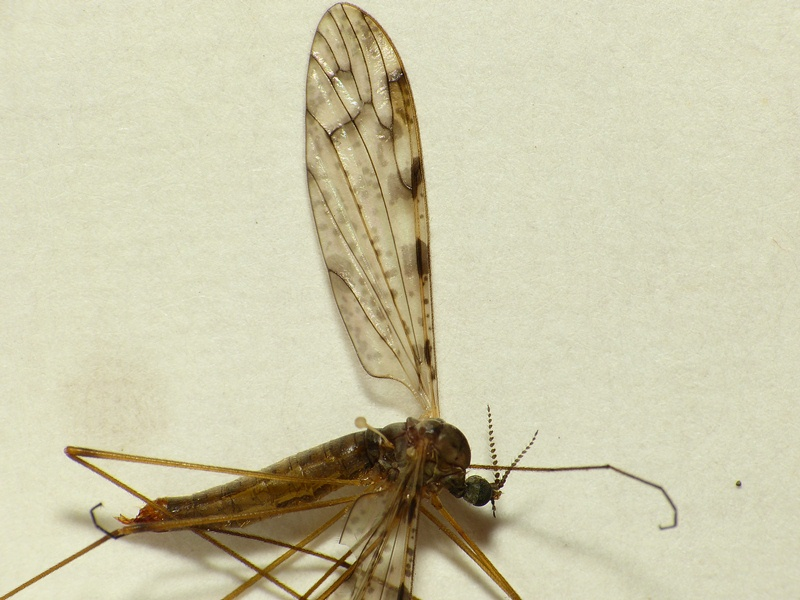
- Rhipidia maculata

Scientific classification
- Domain: Eukaryota
- Kingdom: Animalia
- Phylum: Arthropoda
- Class: Insecta
- Order: Diptera
- Family: Limoniidae
- Subfamily: Limoniinae
- Genus: Rhipidia; Meigen, 1818

Type species
- Rhipidia maculata Meigen, 1818

Subgenera
- Eurhipidia Alexander, 1965; Rhipidia Meigen, 1818

Synonyms
- Ceratostephanus Brunetti, 1911; Arhipidia Alexander, 1912; Monorhipidia Alexander, 1912; Conorhipidia Alexander, 914.

= Rhipidia =

Genus of flies

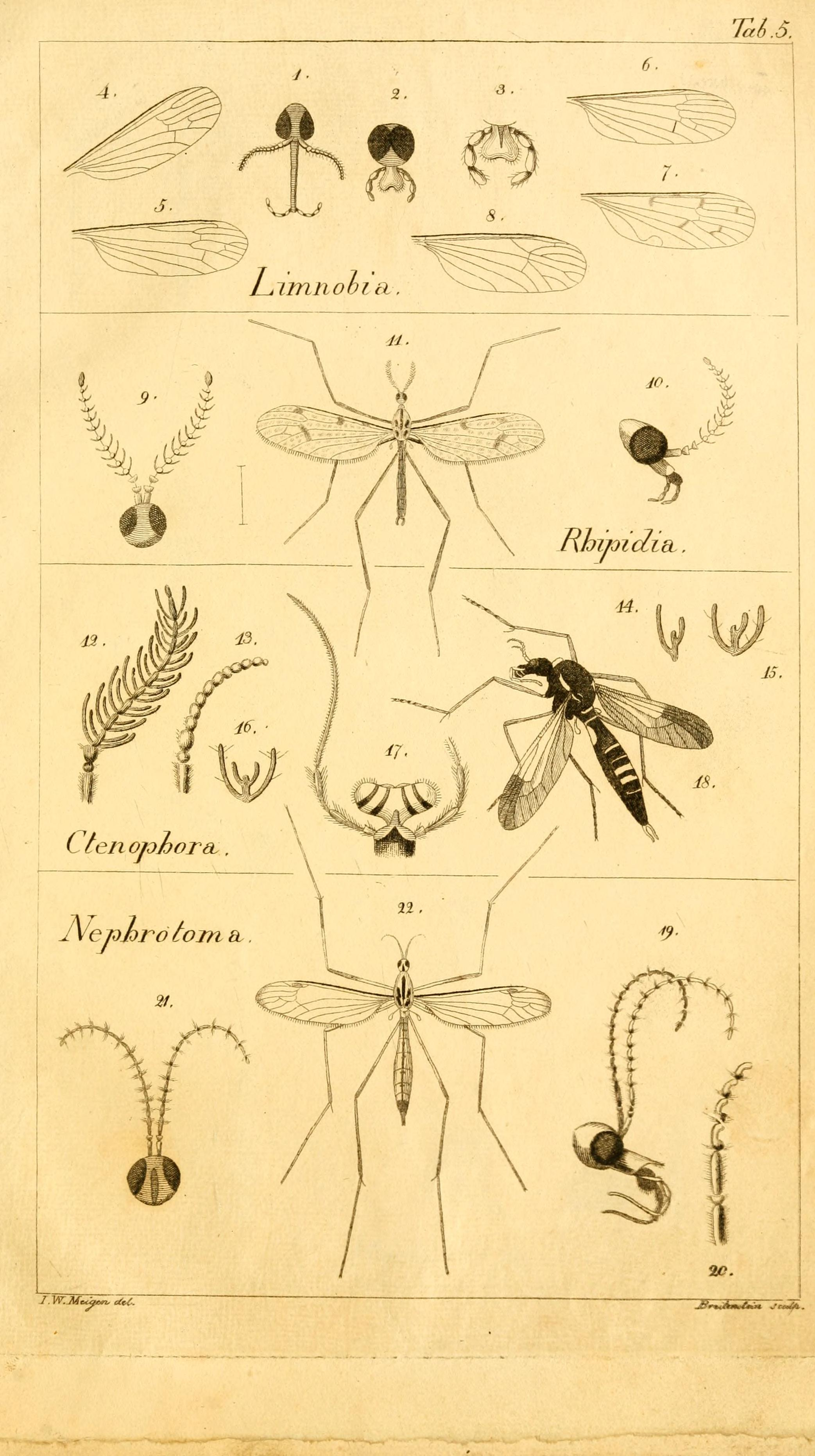
Rhipidia in Meigen Systematische Beschreibung der bekannten europäischen zweiflügeligen Insekten Tome 1 1818

Rhipidia is a genus of crane fly in the family Limoniidae.

== Species ==
- Subgenus Eurhipidia (Alexander, 1965)

- R. aoroneura (Alexander, 1956)
- R. argema (Alexander, 1967)
- R. brevifilosa (Alexander, 1965)
- R. citricolor (Alexander, 1976)
- R. coheriana (Alexander, 1959)
- R. endecamera (Alexander, 1960)
- R. expansimacula (Alexander, 1934)
- R. extraria (Alexander, 1955)
- R. formosana (Alexander, 1923)
- R. garrula (Alexander, 1933)
- R. garruloides (Alexander, 1933)
- R. hariola (Alexander, 1965)
- R. hexadiclona (Alexander, 1967)
- R. impicta (Edwards, 1933)
- R. incompleta (Riedel, 1914)
- R. luteipleuralis (Alexander, 1931)
- R. mediofilosa (Alexander, 1965)
- R. morionella (Edwards, 1928)
- R. perscitula (Alexander, 1966)
- R. pictipennis (Edwards, 1926)
- R. simplicis (Alexander, 1966)
- R. submorionella (Alexander, 1956)

- Subgenus Rhipidia (Meigen, 1818)

- R. afra (Bergroth, 1888)
- R. agglomerata (Alexander, 1926)
- R. alampetis (Alexander, 1971)
- R. annulicornis (Enderlein, 1912)
- R. antennata (Brunetti, 1911)
- R. antrotrichia (Alexander, 1967)
- R. aoneurodes (Alexander, 1979)
- R. aphrodite (Alexander, 1942)
- R. aspilota (Alexander, 1967)
- R. atomaria (Loew, 1866)
- R. atopolobos (Alexander, 1979)
- R. banosensis (Alexander, 1946)
- R. bellingeri (Alexander, 1964)
- R. bipectinata (Williston, 1896)
- R. brevipetalia (Alexander, 1950)
- R. breviramosa (Alexander, 1936)
- R. bruchiana (Alexander, 1929)
- R. bryanti (Johnson, 1909)
- R. calverti (Alexander, 1912)
- R. cassandra (Alexander, 1945)
- R. cermatoleuca (Alexander, 1967)
- R. chiloeana (Alexander, 1967)
- R. choprai (Alexander, 1927)
- R. commelina (Alexander, 1946)
- R. complexa (Alexander, 1950)
- R. conica conica (Alexander, 1914)
- R. conica turrifera (Alexander, 1931)
- R. costaloides (Alexander, 1920)
- R. cramptoni (Alexander, 1912)
- R. crassirostris (Alexander, 1965)
- R. ctenophora (Loew, 1871)
- R. curtiramosa (Alexander, 1979)
- R. cymula (Alexander, 1979)
- R. cytherea (Alexander, 1942)
- R. degradans (Savchenko, 1983)
- R. demarcata (Brunetti, 1912)
- R. diacaena (Alexander, 1978)
- R. dione (Alexander, 1964)
- R. diploclada (Alexander, 1941)
- R. discreta (Edwards, 1926)
- R. distela (Alexander, 1967)
- R. domestica (Osten Sacken, 1860)
- R. dotalis (Alexander, 1942)
- R. effusa (Alexander, 1956)
- R. eliana (Alexander, 1950)
- R. eremnocera (Alexander, 1970)
- R. eremnoptera (Alexander, 1967)
- R. euterpe (Alexander, 1961)
- R. femorasetosa (Alexander, 1956)
- R. fidelis (Osten Sacken, 1860)
- R. flabelliformis (Alexander, 1934)
- R. flavopostica (Alexander, 1978)
- R. gaspicola (Alexander, 1941)
- R. gethosyne (Alexander, 1961)
- R. gracililoba (Alexander, 1978)
- R. gracilirama (Alexander, 1940)
- R. griseipennis (Edwards, 1926)
- R. griveaudi (Alexander, 1961)
- R. guerrerensis (Alexander, 1946)
- R. hedys (Alexander, 1980)
- R. hirtilobata (Alexander, 1939)
- R. hoguei (Byers, 1981)
- R. holwayi (Alexander, 1978)
- R. huachucensis (Alexander, 1955)
- R. hypomelania (Alexander, 1936)
- R. illuminata (Alexander, 1967)
- R. impictipennis (Alexander, 1952)
- R. improperata (Alexander, 1936)
- R. inaequipectinata (Alexander, 1929)
- R. ingenua (Alexander, 1945)
- R. invaripennis (Alexander, 1941)
- R. isospilota (Alexander, 1936)
- R. javanensis (de Meijere, 1911)
- R. josephi (Alexander, 1971)
- R. jubilata (Alexander, 1938)
- R. juninensis (Alexander, 1942)
- R. kama (Alexander, 1956)
- R. katernes (Alexander, 1980)
- R. laetitarsis (Alexander, 1938)
- R. lais (Alexander, 1950)
- R. latilutea (Alexander, 1942)
- R. leda (Alexander, 1945)
- R. lichnophora (Alexander, 1962)
- R. longispina (Alexander, 1922)
- R. longurio (Alexander, 1938)
- R. lucea (Savchenko, 1974)
- R. luquilloensis (Alexander, 1950)
- R. luxuriosa (Alexander, 1929)
- R. maculata (Meigen, 1818)
- R. martinezi (Alexander, 1978)
- R. megalopyga (Alexander, 1967)
- R. melanaria (Alexander, 1942)
- R. microsticta (Alexander, 1921)
- R. miosema (Speiser, 1909)
- R. monnula (Alexander, 1962)
- R. monoctenia (Alexander, 1935)
- R. monophora (Alexander, 1952)
- R. monoxantha (Alexander, 1944)
- R. mordax (Alexander, 1950)
- R. multifida (Alexander, 1926)
- R. multiguttata (Alexander, 1912)
- R. multipunctigera (Alexander, 1946)
- R. multiramosa (Alexander, 1950)
- R. mutila (Alexander, 1928)
- R. myriosticta (Alexander, 1941)
- R. mystica (Alexander, 1931)
- R. neglecta (Alexander, 1936)
- R. neomelanaria (Alexander, 1980)
- R. neomystica (Alexander, 1980)
- R. neorhasma (Alexander, 1978)
- R. nigrorostrata (Alexander, 1938)
- R. nobilissima (Alexander, 1941)
- R. nubilosa (Alexander, 1967)
- R. ocellana (Alexander, 1942)
- R. pallatangae (Alexander, 1929)
- R. pallidipes (Alexander, 1921)
- R. pallidistigma (Alexander, 1928)
- R. paraguayana (Alexander, 1929)
- R. parahedys (Alexander, 1980)
- R. paulus (Alexander, 1947)
- R. perarmata (Alexander, 1921)
- R. peratripes (Alexander, 1967)
- R. persimplex (Alexander, 1950)
- R. phaon (Alexander, 1950)
- R. platyphallus (Alexander, 1969)
- R. plurinervis (Riedel, 1921)
- R. polyclada (Alexander, 1943)
- R. polythrix (Alexander, 1978)
- R. praesuffusa (Alexander, 1969)
- R. pratti (Alexander, 1950)
- R. preapicalis (Alexander, 1956)
- R. proctigerica (Alexander, 1950)
- R. profana (Alexander, 1941)
- R. proliferata (Alexander, 1940)
- R. proseni (Alexander, 1955)
- R. pulcherrima (Edwards, 1928)
- R. pulchra (de Meijere, 1904)
- R. pumilistyla (Alexander, 1978)
- R. punctiplena (Mik, 1887)
- R. punctoria (Alexander, 1929)
- R. reductispina (Savchenko, 1983)
- R. rhasma (Alexander, 1971)
- R. schadei (Alexander, 1929)
- R. schwarzi (Alexander, 1912)
- R. sejugata (Alexander, 1939)
- R. septentrionis (Alexander, 1913)
- R. servilis (Alexander, 1932)
- R. seydeli (Alexander, 1956)
- R. shannoni (Alexander, 1914)
- R. sigilla (Alexander, 1956)
- R. sigilloides (Alexander, 1955)
- R. simplicicornis (Alexander, 1938)
- R. spadicithorax (Edwards, 1912)
- R. sprucei (Alexander, 1943)
- R. steyskali (Alexander, 1970)
- R. stonei (Alexander, 1938)
- R. subcostalis (Alexander, 1922)
- R. subpectinata (Williston, 1896)
- R. subproctigerica (Alexander, 1978)
- R. subterminalis (Alexander, 1921)
- R. subtesselata (Brunetti, 1912)
- R. subvafra (Alexander, 1962)
- R. succentiva (Alexander, 1941)
- R. superarmata (Alexander, 1942)
- R. surinamica (Alexander, 1946)
- R. sybarita (Alexander, 1946)
- R. sycophanta (Alexander, 1946)
- R. synspilota (Alexander, 1935)
- R. tabescens (Enderlein, 1912)
- R. tenuirama (Alexander, 1966)
- R. tetracantha (Alexander, 1927)
- R. tetraleuca (Alexander, 1937)
- R. thysbe (Alexander, 1942)
- R. tiresias (Alexander, 1950)
- R. triarmata (Alexander, 1930)
- R. tridigitata (Alexander, 1943)
- R. trigracilis (Alexander, 1958)
- R. tripectinata (Alexander, 1931)
- R. turritella (Alexander, 1943)
- R. ugra (Alexander, 1965)
- R. unipectinata (Williston, 1896)
- R. uniseriata (Schiner, 1864)
- R. uxor (Alexander, 1942)
- R. vafra (Alexander, 1941)
- R. variicosta (Alexander, 1934)
- R. willistoniana (Alexander, 1929)
- R. xanthoscelis (Edwards, 1933)
