= Neolimonia =

- Neolimonia dumetorum in copula

Scientific classification
- Kingdom: Animalia
- Phylum: Arthropoda
- Class: Insecta
- Order: Diptera
- Family: Limoniidae
- Subfamily: Limoniinae
- Genus: Neolimonia; Alexander, 1964

Type species
- Furcomyia eiseni Alexander, 1912

Species
- see text

Genus of flies

Neolimonia is a genus of crane fly in the family Limoniidae.

== Distribution ==
Caribbean, North, Central & South America. Only one species (Neolimonia dumetorum) can be found in Europe.

== Species ==
- N. amazonica (Alexander, 1920)
- N. argenteceps (Alexander, 1912)
- N. austera (Alexander, 1950)
- N. bimucronata (Alexander, 1938)
- N. borinquensis (Alexander, 1950)
- N. caribaea (Alexander, 1933)
- N. cordillerensis (Alexander, 1913)
- N. cuzcoensis (Alexander, 1967)
- N. deceptrix (Alexander, 1945)
- N. dicax (Alexander, 1941)
- N. domballah (Alexander, 1939)
- N. dumetorum (Meigen, 1804)
- N. eiseni (Alexander, 1912)
- N. euryleon (Alexander, 1950)
- N. gurneyi (Alexander, 1970)
- N. hesione (Alexander, 1950)
- N. horrenda (Alexander, 1944)
- N. huacapistanae (Alexander, 1941)
- N. hyperphallus (Alexander, 1938)
- N. immodica (Alexander, 1938)
- N. indomita (Alexander, 1938)
- N. jamaicensis (Alexander, 1926)
- N. lachesis (Alexander, 1942)
- N. lawlori (Alexander, 1934)
- N. ludibunda (Alexander, 1927)
- N. lustralis (Alexander, 1938)
- N. macintyrei (Alexander, 1938)
- N. onoma (Alexander, 1950)
- N. optabilis (Alexander, 1921)
- N. pastazicola (Alexander, 1938)
- N. porrecta (Alexander, 1950)
- N. precipua (Alexander, 1979)
- N. quadricostata (Alexander, 1980)
- N. rara (Osten Sacken, 1869)
- N. remissa (Alexander, 1928)
- N. roraimae (Alexander, 1931)
- N. sanctaemartae (Alexander, 1930)
- N. scabristyla (Alexander, 1968)
- N. subdomita (Alexander, 1945)
- N. sublustralis (Alexander, 1979)
- N. subporrecta (Alexander, 1980)
- N. tragica (Alexander, 1946)
- N. velasteguii (Alexander, 1938)
