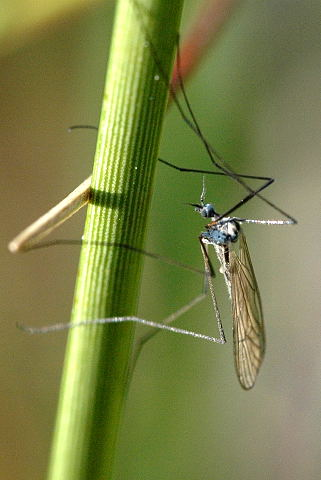
- Dicranoptycha fuscescens

Scientific classification
- Kingdom: Animalia
- Phylum: Arthropoda
- Class: Insecta
- Order: Diptera
- Family: Limoniidae
- Subfamily: Limoniinae
- Tribe: Limoniini
- Genus: Dicranoptycha; Osten Sacken, 1860

Type species
- Dicranoptycha germana Osten Sacken, 1860

Species
- see text

Synonyms
- Marginomyia Meigen, 1818; Ulugbekia Savchenko, 1970.

= Dicranoptycha =

Genus of flies

Dicranoptycha is a genus of crane fly in the family Limoniidae.

== Species ==
- D. acanthophallus Alexander, 1940
- D. acuterebra Alexander, 1960
- D. atricolor Alexander, 1920
- D. atripes Alexander, 1963
- D. aurogeniculata Alexander, 1951
- D. australis Alexander, 1926
- D. azrael Alexander, 1953
- D. basitarsata Alexander, 1960
- D. breviterebra Alexander, 1960
- D. byersi Young, 1987
- D. caesia Alexander, 1928
- D. cinerascens (Meigen, 1818)
- D. confluens Alexander, 1923
- D. costaricensis Alexander, 1939
- D. diacaena Alexander, 1963
- D. diacantha Alexander, 1938
- D. edashigeana Alexander, 1955
- D. elsa Alexander, 1929
- D. formosensis Alexander, 1928
- D. freidbergi Stary, 1994
- D. fuscescens (Schummel, 1829)
- D. geniculata Alexander, 1928
- D. germana Osten Sacken, 1860
- D. griveaudi Alexander, 1965
- D. harpyia Alexander, 1946
- D. hasegawai Alexander, 1955
- D. ibo Alexander, 1976
- D. issikina Alexander, 1930
- D. keiserae Alexander, 1963
- D. kenyana Séguy, 1938
- D. kwangtungensis Alexander, 1942
- D. laevis Alexander, 1948
- D. lataurata Alexander, 1963
- D. leucopoda Alexander, 1953
- D. linsdalei Alexander, 1966
- D. livescens Loew, 1871
- D. longipennis Alexander, 1963
- D. luteipes Alexander, 1923
- D. machidana Alexander, 1932
- D. malabarica Alexander, 1941
- D. matengoensis Alexander, 1970
- D. megaphallus Alexander, 1926
- D. melampygia Alexander, 1950
- D. minima Alexander, 1919
- D. mirabilis Savchenko, 1970
- D. natalia Alexander, 1920
- D. nigripes Osten Sacken, 1860
- D. nigrogenualis Alexander, 1949
- D. nigrotibialis Alexander, 1934
- D. nox Alexander, 1960
- D. occidentalis Alexander, 1927
- D. pachystyla Alexander, 1963
- D. pallida Alexander, 1926
- D. paralivescens Stary, 1972
- D. patens Alexander, 1960
- D. phallosomica Alexander, 1937
- D. pholiota Alexander, 1963
- D. polysticta Alexander, 1953
- D. prolongata Alexander, 1938
- D. pseudocinerea Stary, 1972
- D. quadrivittata Alexander, 1919
- D. recurvispina Savchenko, 1974
- D. robinsoni Alexander, 1958
- D. rubronigra Alexander, 1955
- D. savtshenkoi Mendl, 1976
- D. septemtrionis Alexander, 1926
- D. sobrina Osten Sacken, 1860
- D. spinifera Young, 1987
- D. spinigera Alexander, 1958
- D. spinosissima Alexander, 1950
- D. squamigera Alexander, 1963
- D. stenophallus Alexander, 1950
- D. strictoneura Alexander, 1953
- D. stuckenbergi Alexander, 1970
- D. stygipes Alexander, 1938
- D. suensoniana Alexander, 1941
- D. tennessa Alexander, 1941
- D. tigrina Alexander, 1919
- D. trochanterata Speiser, 1908
- D. venosa Alexander, 1924
- D. verticillata Alexander, 1958
- D. vulpes Alexander, 1935
- D. winnemana Alexander, 1916
- D. yamata Alexander, 1919
