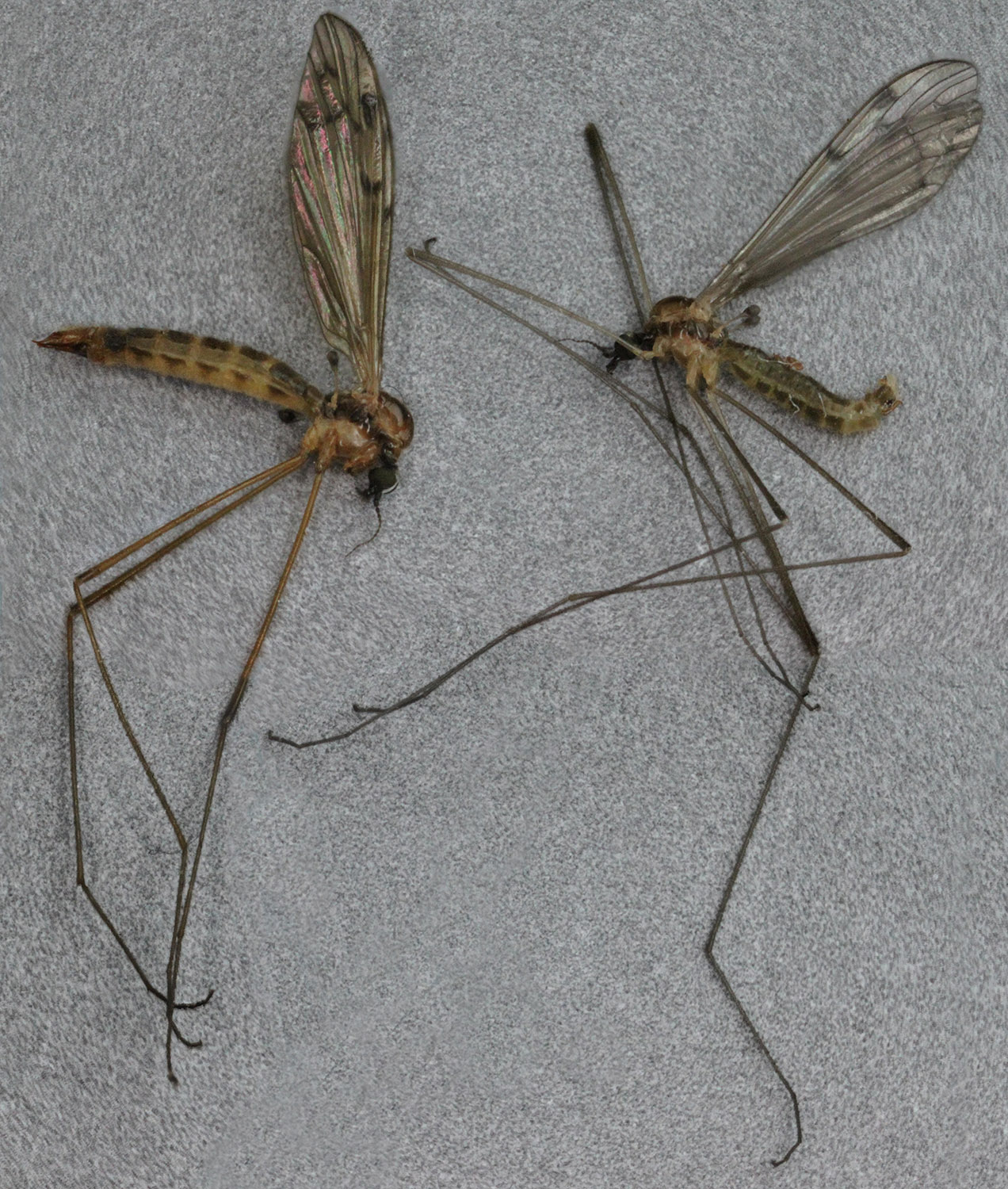
- Neolimonia dumetorum North Wales

Scientific classification
- Kingdom: Animalia
- Phylum: Arthropoda
- Class: Insecta
- Order: Diptera
- Family: Limoniidae
- Genus: Neolimonia
- Species: N. dumetorum

Binomial name
- Neolimonia dumetorum (Meigen, 1804)

= Neolimonia dumetorum =

Species of fly

Neolimonia dumetorum is a species of fly in the family Limoniidae. It is found in the Palearctic.

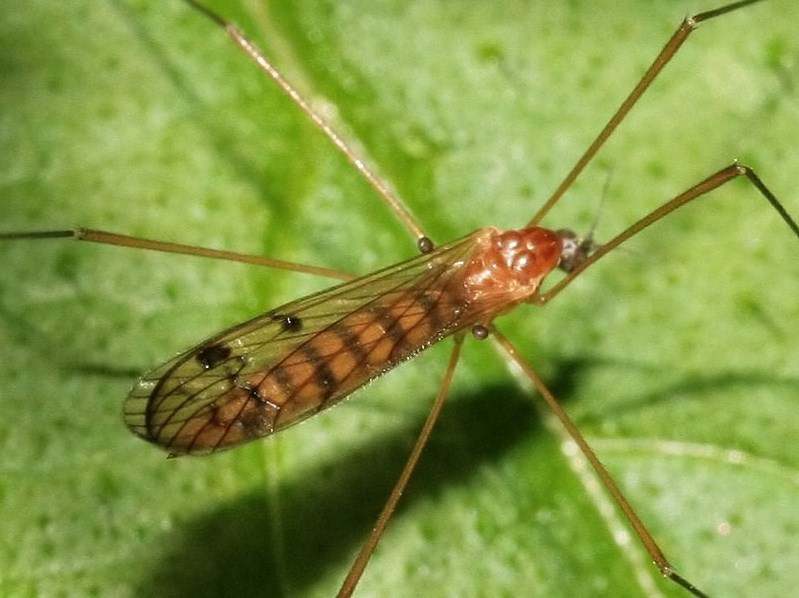
Neolimonia dumetorum Netherlands

Video.Copula

Video.With pseudoscorpion
