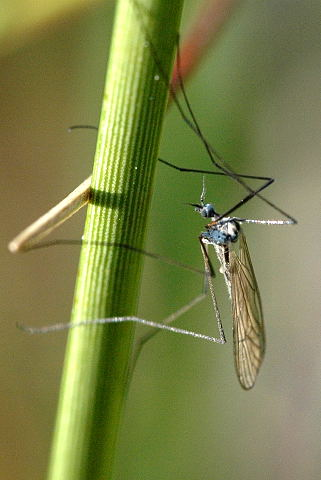

Scientific classification
- Domain: Eukaryota
- Kingdom: Animalia
- Phylum: Arthropoda
- Class: Insecta
- Order: Diptera
- Family: Limoniidae
- Genus: Dicranoptycha
- Species: D. fuscescens

Binomial name
- Dicranoptycha fuscescens (Schummel, 1829)

Synonyms
- Limnobia fuscescens Schummel, 1829

= Dicranoptycha fuscescens =

Species of fly

Dicranoptycha fuscescens is a species of fly in the family Limoniidae.
