= Dicranoptycha nigripes =

Scientific classification
- Domain: Eukaryota
- Kingdom: Animalia
- Phylum: Arthropoda
- Class: Insecta
- Order: Diptera
- Family: Limoniidae
- Genus: Dicranoptycha
- Species: D. nigripes

Binomial name
- Dicranoptycha nigripes Osten Sacken, 1860

Species of fly

Dicranoptycha nigripes is a species of limoniid crane fly in the family Limoniidae.
