= Platylimnobia =

Scientific classification
- Kingdom: Animalia
- Phylum: Arthropoda
- Class: Insecta
- Order: Diptera
- Family: Limoniidae
- Subfamily: Limnophilinae
- Genus: Platylimnobia; Alexander, 1917

Type species
- Platylimnobia barnardi Alexander, 1917

Species
- see text

Genus of flies

Platylimnobia is a genus of crane fly in the family Limoniidae.

== Distribution ==
South Africa.

== Species ==
- P. barnardi Alexander, 1917
- P. brinckiana Alexander, 1964
- P. montana Wood, 1952
- P. pseudopumila Wood, 1952
- P. pumila Alexander, 1921
