= Thaumastoptera =

Scientific classification
- Kingdom: Animalia
- Phylum: Arthropoda
- Class: Insecta
- Order: Diptera
- Family: Limoniidae
- Subfamily: Limnophilinae
- Genus: Thaumastoptera; Mik, 1866

Type species
- Thaumastoptera calceata Mik, 1866

Subgenera
- Taiwanita Alexander, 1929; Thaumastoptera Mik, 1866

Genus of flies

Thaumastoptera is a genus of crane fly in the family Limoniidae.

== Species ==
- Subgenus Taiwanita Alexander, 1929

- T. issikiana Alexander, 1929

- Subgenus Thaumastoptera Mik, 1866

- T. calceata Mik, 1866
- T. hynesi Alexander, 1964
- T. insignis Lackschewitz, 1940
- T. intermixta Savchenko, 1974
- T. maculivena Alexander, 1931
- T. natalensis Alexander, 1956
- T. nilgiriensis Alexander, 1951
- T. stuckenbergi Alexander, 1961
