= Xenolimnobia =

Scientific classification
- Kingdom: Animalia
- Phylum: Arthropoda
- Class: Insecta
- Order: Diptera
- Family: Limoniidae
- Subfamily: Limnophilinae
- Genus: Xenolimnobia; Alexander, 1926

Type species
- Xenolimnobia camerounensis Alexander, 1926

Species
- see text

Genus of flies

Xenolimnobia is a genus of crane flies in the family Limoniidae.

== Distribution ==
Cameroon, Nigeria.

== Species ==
- X. camerounensis Alexander, 1926
