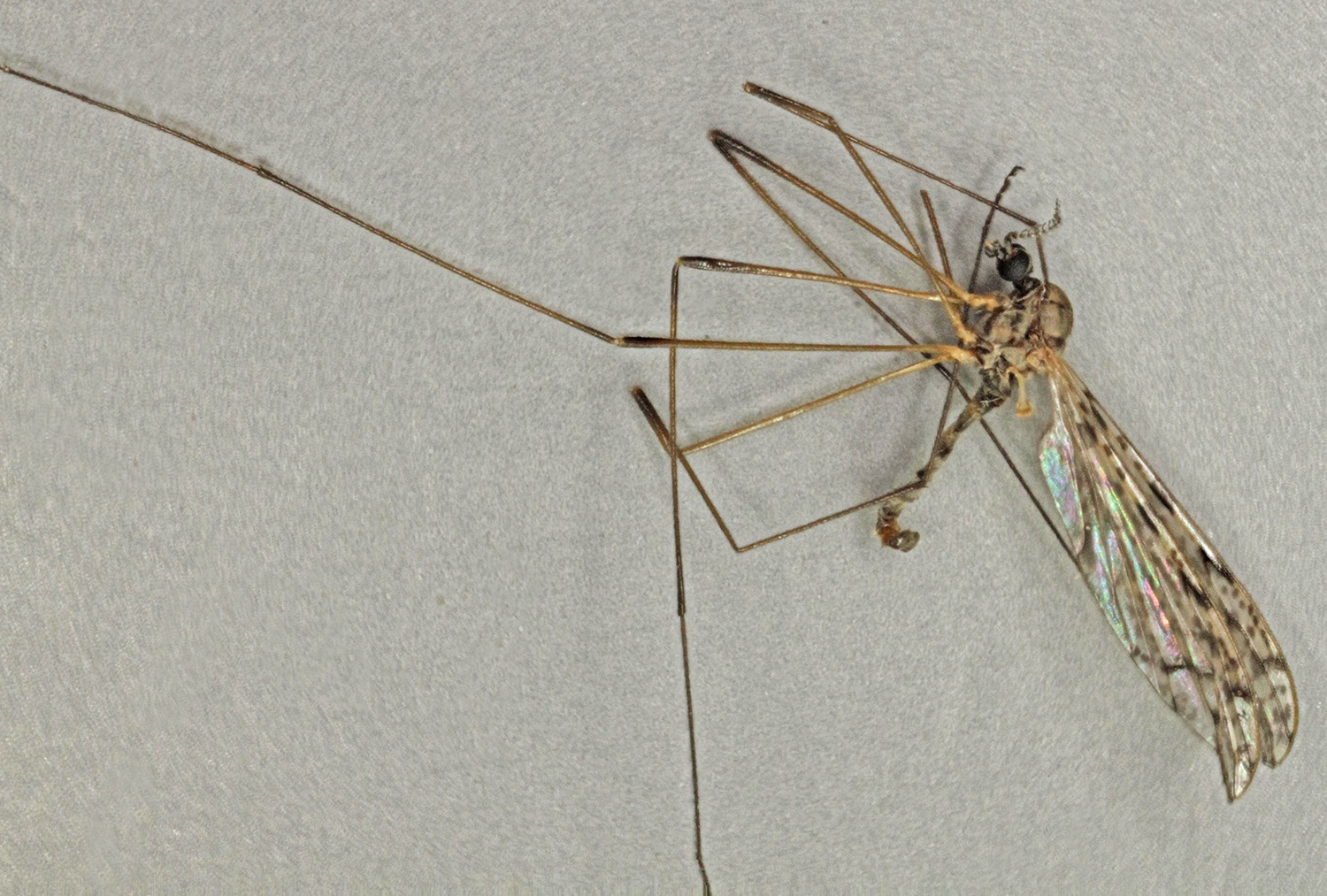
- Rhipidia maculata North Wales

Scientific classification
- Kingdom: Animalia
- Phylum: Arthropoda
- Class: Insecta
- Order: Diptera
- Family: Limoniidae
- Genus: Rhipidia
- Species: R. maculata

Binomial name
- Rhipidia maculata Meigen, 1818

= Rhipidia maculata =

Species of fly

Rhipidia maculata is a Palearctic species of craneflies in the family Limoniidae.It is found in a wide range of habitats and micro habitats: in earth rich in humus, in swamps and marshes, in leaf litter and in wet spots in woods.
