= Tonnoiromyia =

Scientific classification
- Kingdom: Animalia
- Phylum: Arthropoda
- Class: Insecta
- Order: Diptera
- Family: Limoniidae
- Subfamily: Limnophilinae
- Genus: Tonnoiromyia; Alexander, 1926

Type species
- Tonnoiromyia tasmaniensis Alexander, 1926

Species
- see text

Genus of flies

Tonnoiromyia is a genus of crane fly in the family Limoniidae.

== Distribution ==
Argentina, Chile & Australia.

== Species ==
- T. montina Alexander, 1933
- T. patagonica Alexander, 1929
- T. spinulosa Alexander, 1971
- T. tasmaniensis Alexander, 1926
- T. undoolya Theischinger, 1994
