= Taiwanina =

Scientific classification
- Kingdom: Animalia
- Phylum: Arthropoda
- Class: Insecta
- Order: Diptera
- Family: Limoniidae
- Subfamily: Limnophilinae
- Genus: Taiwanina; Alexander, 1928

Type species
- Taiwanina pandoxa Alexander, 1928

Species
- see text

Genus of flies

Taiwanina is a genus of crane fly in the family Limoniidae.

== Distribution ==
Philippines & Taiwan

== Species ==
- T. mindanica Alexander, 1932
- T. pandoxa Alexander, 1928
