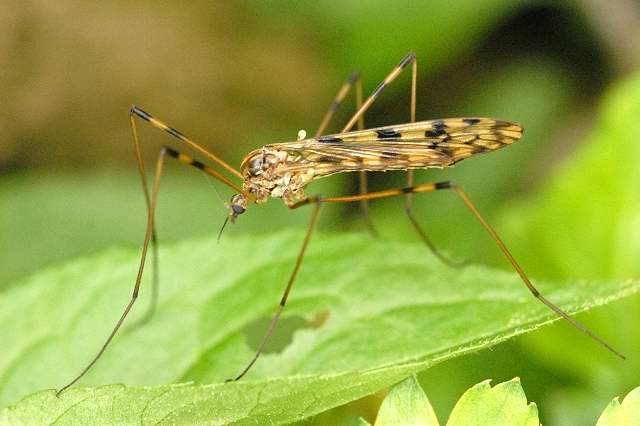
- Metalimnobia quadrimaculata

Scientific classification
- Kingdom: Animalia
- Phylum: Arthropoda
- Class: Insecta
- Order: Diptera
- Family: Limoniidae
- Subfamily: Limnophilinae
- Genus: Metalimnobia; Matsumura, 1911

Type species
- Metalimnobia vittata [= bifasciata (Schrank, 1781)] Matsumura, 1911

Subgenus
- Lasiolimonia; Metalimnobia; Tricholimonia

= Metalimnobia =

Genus of flies

Metalimnobia is a genus of crane fly in the family Limoniidae.

== Species ==
- Subgenus Lasiolimonia Alexander, 1976

- M. marlieri (Alexander, 1976)
- M. oligotricha (Alexander, 1955)
- M. tigripes (Alexander, 1948)

- Subgenus Metalimnobia Matsumura, 1911

- M. annulifemur (de Meijere, 1913)
- M. biannulata (Brunetti, 1912)
- M. bifasciata (Schrank, 1781)
- M. brahma (Alexander, 1965)
- M. californica (Osten Sacken, 1861)
- M. charlesi Salmela & Stary, 2009
- M. cinctipes (Say, 1823)
- M. dietziana (Alexander, 1927)
- M. dualis Savchenko, 1986
- M. eusebeia (Alexander, 1966)
- M. fallax (Johnson, 1909)
- M. hedone (Alexander, 1959)
- M. hudsonica (Osten Sacken, 1861)
- M. immatura (Osten Sacken, 1860)
- M. improvisa (Alexander, 1933)
- M. jactator (Alexander, 1959)
- M. lanceolata Savchenko, 1983
- M. megastigma (Alexander, 1922)
- M. mendax (Alexander, 1924)
- M. novaeangliae (Alexander, 1929)
- M. quadrimaculata (Linnaeus, 1760)
- M. quadrinotata (Meigen, 1818)
- M. solitaria (Osten Sacken, 1860)
- M. tenua Savchenko, 1976
- M. triocellata (Osten Sacken, 1860)
- M. triphaea (Alexander, 1954)
- M. xanthopteroides (Riedel, 1917)
- M. yunnanica (Edwards, 1928)
- M. zetterstedti (Tjeder, 1968)

- Subgenus Tricholimonia Alexander, 1965

- M. compta (Alexander, 1920)
- M. congoensis (Alexander, 1920)
- M. edwardsi (Alexander, 1920)
- M. grahami (Alexander, 1920)
- M. humfreyi (Alexander, 1920)
- M. imitatrix (Alexander, 1923)
- M. renaudi (Alexander, 1955)
- M. schoutedeni (Alexander, 1923)
- M. sparsisetosa (Alexander, 1972)
- M. zernyana (Alexander, 1956)
