= Lechria =

Scientific classification
- Kingdom: Animalia
- Phylum: Arthropoda
- Class: Insecta
- Order: Diptera
- Family: Limoniidae
- Subfamily: Limnophilinae
- Genus: Lechria; Skuse, 1890

Type species
- Lechria singularis Skuse, 1890

Species
- see text

Genus of flies

Lechria is a genus of crane fly in the family Limoniidae.

== Distribution ==
Papua New Guinea, Irian Jaya, Nepal, India, Java, Malaysia, Sumatra, Philippines & Australia

== Species ==
- L. albidipes Alexander, 1947
- L. angustaxillaris Alexander, 1948
- L. argentosigna Alexander, 1958
- L. argyrospila Alexander, 1957
- L. bengalensis Brunetti, 1911
- L. coorgensis Alexander, 1960
- L. delicatior Alexander, 1948
- L. fuscomarginata Alexander, 1956
- L. interstitialis Alexander, 1953
- L. leucopeza de Meijere, 1914
- L. longicellula Alexander, 1950
- L. lucida de Meijere, 1911
- L. luzonica Alexander, 1929
- L. nehruana Alexander, 1956
- L. philippinensis Alexander, 1925
- L. rufithorax Alexander, 1920
- L. singularis Skuse, 1890
- L. sublaevis Alexander, 1920
