= Trentepohlia (fly) =

Scientific classification
- Kingdom: Animalia
- Phylum: Arthropoda
- Class: Insecta
- Order: Diptera
- Family: Limoniidae
- Subfamily: Limoniinae
- Genus: Trentepohlia; Bigot, 1854

Type species
- Limnobia limnobioides Bigot, 1854 [= trentepohlii (Wiedemann, 1828)]

Subgenera
- Anchimongoma Brunetti, 1918; Mongoma Westwood, 1881; Neomongoma Alexander, 1919; Paramongoma Brunetti, 1911; Plesiomongoma Brunetti, 1918; Promongoma Alexander, 1938; Trentepohlia Bigot, 1854

Synonyms
- Mongomioides Brunetti, 1911

Genus of flies

Trentepohlia is a genus of crane fly in the family Limoniidae.

== Species ==
- Subgenus Anchimongoma Brunetti, 1918

- T. angusticincta Alexander, 1947
- T. apoicola Alexander, 1931
- T. beata Alexander, 1932
- T. niveipes Edwards, 1927
- T. simplex (Brunetti, 1918)

- Subgenus Mongoma Westwood, 1881

- T. acanthophora Alexander, 1973
- T. aequialba Alexander, 1931
- T. aequinigra Alexander, 1931
- T. albangusta Edwards, 1928
- T. albilata Alexander, 1920
- T. albilatissima Alexander, 1920
- T. albipennis (de Meijere, 1913)
- T. alboposticata Alexander, 1960
- T. alboterminalis Alexander, 1932
- T. amissa Alexander, 1964
- T. amphileuca Alexander, 1936
- T. amphinipha Alexander, 1967
- T. argopoda Alexander, 1960
- T. atayal Alexander, 1929
- T. atrobasalis Alexander, 1959
- T. auranticolor Alexander, 1934
- T. auricosta Alexander, 1934
- T. australasiae Skuse, 1890
- T. bicinctatra Alexander, 1953
- T. bombayensis Edwards, 1927
- T. brassi Alexander, 1960
- T. brevicellula Alexander, 1924
- T. brevifusa Alexander, 1930
- T. brevipes Alexander, 1931
- T. brunnea Edwards, 1928
- T. butleri Alexander, 1950
- T. cachani Alexander, 1953
- T. callisto Alexander, 1955
- T. cameronensis Edwards, 1928
- T. carbonipes Alexander, 1934
- T. cariniceps (Enderlein, 1912)
- T. choprai Alexander, 1927
- T. costofimbriata Alexander, 1935
- T. distalis Alexander, 1931
- T. distigma Edwards, 1928
- T. dummeri Alexander, 1921
- T. duyagi Alexander, 1930
- T. dybasiana Alexander, 1972
- T. elegantissima Alexander, 1961
- T. enervata Alexander, 1936
- T. ephippiata Alexander, 1936
- T. errans Alexander, 1944
- T. esakii Alexander, 1923
- T. eurystigma Alexander, 1973
- T. filicornis Edwards, 1928
- T. fimbriata Edwards, 1933
- T. fimbricosta Alexander, 1973
- T. flava (Brunetti, 1918)
- T. flavicollis (Edwards, 1925)
- T. flavidella Alexander, 1978
- T. flavoides Alexander, 1973
- T. fortis Edwards, 1926
- T. fragillima (Westwood, 1881)
- T. fulvinota Alexander, 1932
- T. fuscistigma Edwards, 1928
- T. fuscogenualis Alexander, 1969
- T. galactopa Edwards, 1927
- T. guamensis (Alexander, 1915)
- T. hainanica Alexander, 1936
- T. hendersoni Edwards, 1928
- T. hepatica Alexander, 1960
- T. horiana Alexander, 1960
- T. ibelensis Alexander, 1964
- T. kempi (Brunetti, 1918)
- T. kinabaluensis Edwards, 1933
- T. labuana Edwards, 1931
- T. laetithorax Alexander, 1934
- T. latatra Alexander, 1953
- T. liponeura Alexander, 1962
- T. longisetosa Alexander, 1936
- T. lutescens Edwards, 1931
- T. luzonensis Edwards, 1926
- T. macrotrichia Alexander, 1964
- T. madagascariensis Alexander, 1920
- T. majestica Alexander, 1960
- T. majuscula Alexander, 1931
- T. metatarsatra Alexander, 1920
- T. monacantha Alexander, 1978
- T. montina Alexander, 1930
- T. nigrescens Alexander, 1936
- T. nigriceps (de Meijere, 1919)
- T. niveipes Alexander, 1921
- T. obscura (de Meijere, 1913)
- T. pacifica Alexander, 1921
- T. pallidipes Edwards, 1928
- T. pallidiventris (Brunetti, 1912)
- T. parallela Alexander, 1951
- T. parvella Alexander, 1973
- T. parvicellula Alexander, 1973
- T. parvicellula Edwards, 1928
- T. parvistigma Alexander, 1973
- T. patens Alexander, 1967
- T. pendleburyi Edwards, 1928
- T. pennipes (Osten Sacken, 1888)
- T. pererecta Alexander, 1973
- T. persimilis Alexander, 1932
- T. platyleuca Alexander, 1936
- T. poliocephala Alexander, 1929
- T. praesulis Alexander, 1947
- T. principalis Alexander, 1957
- T. pumila Alexander, 1973
- T. quadrimaculata Edwards, 1931
- T. regifica Alexander, 1953
- T. reisi Alexander, 1920
- T. retracta Edwards, 1927
- T. ricardi Alexander, 1930
- T. riverai Alexander, 1930
- T. saipanensis Alexander, 1972
- T. samoensis Alexander, 1921
- T. sarawakensis Edwards, 1926
- T. saxatilis Alexander, 1929
- T. scalator Alexander, 1953
- T. separata Alexander, 1934
- T. setifera Edwards, 1931
- T. siporensis Edwards, 1932
- T. solomonensis Alexander, 1936
- T. spectralis Edwards, 1928
- T. spiculata Edwards, 1933
- T. spinaspersa Alexander, 1964
- T. spinulifera Edwards, 1928
- T. splendida (Brunetti, 1918)
- T. subappressa Alexander, 1964
- T. subpennata Alexander, 1935
- T. subpennipes Alexander, 1957
- T. subquadrata Edwards, 1926
- T. subtenera Alexander, 1936
- T. tarsalba Alexander, 1929
- T. tarsalis Alexander, 1924
- T. tenera (Osten Sacken, 1882)
- T. teneroides Alexander, 1932
- T. tenuicercus Alexander, 1964
- T. tomensis Alexander, 1957
- T. valida Edwards, 1928
- T. varipes Alexander, 1960
- T. vitrina Alexander, 1973
- T. walshiana Alexander, 1936

- Subgenus Neomongoma Alexander, 1919

- T. disjuncta (Alexander, 1913)
- T. fuscoterminalis Alexander, 1949
- T. mesonotalis Alexander, 1949
- T. pictipes Alexander, 1979
- T. sordidipennis Alexander, 1943
- T. suberecta Alexander, 1939
- T. zernyi Alexander, 1942

- Subgenus Paramongoma Brunetti, 1911

- T. aequivena Alexander, 1980
- T. albitarsis (Doleschall, 1857)
- T. amatrix Alexander, 1942
- T. banahaoensis Alexander, 1930
- T. bromeliadicola (Alexander, 1912)
- T. bromeliae Alexander, 1969
- T. calliope Alexander, 1944
- T. chionopoda Alexander, 1931
- T. chiriquiana Alexander, 1934
- T. concumbens Alexander, 1942
- T. conscripta Alexander, 1949
- T. cubitalis Alexander, 1931
- T. disparilis Alexander, 1944
- T. ditzleri Alexander, 1947
- T. dominicana Alexander, 1947
- T. extensa (Alexander, 1913)
- T. faustina Alexander, 1945
- T. femorata Alexander, 1921
- T. flavella Alexander, 1921
- T. fuscipes Alexander, 1921
- T. fuscistigmosa Alexander, 1960
- T. fuscolimbata Alexander, 1950
- T. geniculata (Alexander, 1914)
- T. laudabilis Alexander, 1942
- T. leucoxena (Alexander, 1914)
- T. longifusa (Alexander, 1913)
- T. lucrifera Alexander, 1936
- T. luteola Alexander, 1956
- T. manca (Williston, 1896)
- T. mera Alexander, 1926
- T. metatarsata (Alexander, 1915)
- T. montivaga Alexander, 1949
- T. neogama Alexander, 1943
- T. nigeriensis Alexander, 1920
- T. niveitarsis (Alexander, 1913)
- T. pallida (Williston, 1896)
- T. pallidistigma Alexander, 1971
- T. pallilutea Alexander, 1975
- T. pallipes (Alexander, 1914)
- T. perpendicularis Alexander, 1956
- T. petulans Alexander, 1937
- T. pusilla Edwards, 1927
- T. ramisiana (Riedel, 1914)
- T. roraimicola Alexander, 1935
- T. sororcula Alexander, 1919
- T. suberrans Alexander, 1979
- T. subleucoxena Alexander, 1940
- T. suffuscipes Alexander, 1947
- T. tatei Alexander, 1960
- T. tethys Alexander, 1949
- T. tucumana Alexander, 1936

- Subgenus Plesiomongoma Brunetti, 1918

- T. callinota Alexander, 1938
- T. candidipes Edwards, 1928
- T. nigropennata Edwards, 1928
- T. novaebrittaniae Alexander, 1935
- T. subcandidipes Alexander, 1937
- T. venosa (Brunetti, 1918)

- Subgenus Promongoma Alexander, 1938

- T. mirabilis Alexander, 1938

- Subgenus Trentepohlia Bigot, 1854

- T. abronia Alexander, 1973
- T. africana Alexander, 1930
- T. albogeniculata (Brunetti, 1912)
- T. alluaudi Alexander, 1920
- T. amantis Alexander, 1956
- T. angustilinea Alexander, 1973
- T. arachne Alexander, 1956
- T. atrogenualis Alexander, 1970
- T. aurantia Alexander, 1920
- T. bakeri Alexander, 1927
- T. bellipennis Alexander, 1955
- T. bifasciata Edwards, 1928
- T. bifascigera Alexander, 1940
- T. bougainvillensis Alexander, 1973
- T. brevisector Alexander, 1923
- T. camillerii Alexander, 1960
- T. cara Alexander, 1956
- T. centrofusca Alexander, 1960
- T. centrofuscoides Alexander, 1972
- T. christophersi Edwards, 1927
- T. clitellaria Alexander, 1934
- T. curtipennis (Speiser, 1908)
- T. delectabilis Alexander, 1941
- T. disconnectans Alexander, 1970
- T. doddi Alexander, 1922
- T. estella Alexander, 1972
- T. exornata Bergroth, 1888
- T. fenestrata Alexander, 1956
- T. festivipennis Edwards, 1928
- T. fijiensis (Alexander, 1914)
- T. fuscoapicalis Alexander, 1920
- T. fuscobasalis Alexander, 1934
- T. fuscomedia Alexander, 1973
- T. gracilis Enderlein, 1912
- T. hexaphalerata Alexander, 1965
- T. holoxantha Alexander, 1929
- T. humeralis Alexander, 1921
- T. hyalina Alexander, 1921
- T. infernalis Alexander, 1967
- T. inflata Alexander, 1920
- T. isis Alexander, 1956
- T. jacobi Alexander, 1934
- T. joana Alexander, 1974
- T. laetipennis Alexander, 1931
- T. larotypa Alexander, 1956
- T. lepida Alexander, 1973
- T. leucophaea Alexander, 1959
- T. limata Alexander, 1973
- T. luteicosta Alexander, 1973
- T. luteicostata Alexander, 1978
- T. marmorata (Brunetti, 1912)
- T. mcgregori Alexander, 1927
- T. mediofusca Alexander, 1960
- T. melanoleuca Alexander, 1958
- T. msingiensis Lindner, 1958
- T. nigricolor Alexander, 1921
- T. nigripes Alexander, 1953
- T. nigrita Alexander, 1963
- T. nigroapicalis (Brunetti, 1912)
- T. nox Alexander, 1921
- T. obsoleta Edwards, 1927
- T. ornatipennis Brunetti, 1918
- T. pallidipleura Alexander, 1926
- T. pamela Alexander, 1959
- T. percelestis Alexander, 1958
- T. perelongata Alexander, 1975
- T. perigethes Alexander, 1960
- T. perpicturata Alexander, 1950
- T. pictipennis Bezzi, 1916
- T. pomeroyi Alexander, 1921
- T. proba Alexander, 1935
- T. pulchripennis Alexander, 1923
- T. reversalis Alexander, 1926
- T. richteri Alexander, 1978
- T. saucia (Alexander, 1915)
- T. septemtrionalis Alexander, 1921
- T. speiseri Edwards, 1913
- T. strepens Alexander, 1936
- T. suavis Alexander, 1955
- T. sutilis Alexander, 1953
- T. taylori Alexander, 1931
- T. trentepohlii (Wiedemann, 1828)
- T. tripunctata Edwards, 1934
- T. ugandae Alexander, 1920
- T. umbricellula Alexander, 1975
- T. venustipennis Edwards, 1926
- T. zambesiae (Alexander, 1912)
