= Orimarga =

Scientific classification
- Kingdom: Animalia
- Phylum: Arthropoda
- Class: Insecta
- Order: Diptera
- Family: Limoniidae
- Subfamily: Limnophilinae
- Genus: Orimarga; Osten Sacken, 1869

Type species
- Limnobia alpina Zetterstedt, 1851

Subgenera
- Diotrepha Osten Sacken, 1878; Orimarga Osten Sacken, 1869; Protorimarga Alexander, 1930

Synonyms
- Ninguis Wallengren, 1882

Genus of flies

Orimarga is a genus of crane fly in the family Limoniidae.

== Species ==
- Subgenus Diotrepha Osten Sacken, 1878

- O. acroleuca Alexander, 1964
- O. arawak Alexander, 1964
- O. atribasis (Alexander, 1914)
- O. bifidaria Alexander, 1970
- O. concinna (Williston, 1896)
- O. elongata Alexander, 1943
- O. flavescens Byers, 1981
- O. flavicosta (Alexander, 1928)
- O. fumicosta (Alexander, 1921)
- O. luteipleura Alexander, 1969
- O. mirabilis (Osten Sacken, 1878)
- O. myersiana (Alexander, 1930)
- O. omissinervis (Alexander, 1913)
- O. profusa Alexander, 1946
- O. quinquefusca Alexander, 1971
- O. setosivena Alexander, 1971
- O. subconcinna Alexander, 1940
- O. subprotrusa Alexander, 1968
- O. syndactyla Alexander, 1942
- O. travassosi Alexander, 1943

- Subgenus Orimarga Osten Sacken, 1869

- O. aequivena Alexander, 1934
- O. amaurospila Alexander, 1972
- O. amblystyla Alexander, 1965
- O. andina Alexander, 1916
- O. annandalei Alexander, 1927
- O. argenteopleura Alexander, 1913
- O. arizonensis Coquillett, 1902
- O. asignata Senior-White, 1924
- O. asura Alexander, 1966
- O. attenuata (Walker, 1848)
- O. australis Skuse, 1890
- O. bahiana Alexander, 1930
- O. basalis Alexander, 1936
- O. basilobata Alexander, 1934
- O. biclavata Alexander, 1974
- O. bifimbriata Alexander, 1974
- O. borneensis Brunetti, 1911
- O. brevicula Alexander, 1956
- O. brevistylata Alexander, 1966
- O. carnosa Alexander, 1956
- O. celestia Alexander, 1972
- O. chionomera Alexander, 1945
- O. chionopus Alexander, 1943
- O. coracina Alexander, 1976
- O. cruciformis Alexander, 1930
- O. cubensis Alexander, 1933
- O. dampfi Alexander, 1926
- O. dichroptera Alexander, 1950
- O. distalis Alexander, 1936
- O. distivenula Alexander, 1936
- O. euryptera Alexander, 1972
- O. exasperata Alexander, 1937
- O. excessiva Alexander, 1926
- O. farriana Alexander, 1964
- O. fasciventris Edwards, 1933
- O. flaviventris Edwards, 1927
- O. fokiensis Alexander, 1941
- O. formosicola Alexander, 1924
- O. frommeri Alexander, 1970
- O. fryeri Edwards, 1912
- O. fulvithorax Alexander, 1955
- O. funerula Alexander, 1929
- O. fuscicosta Alexander, 1966
- O. fuscivenosa Alexander, 1929
- O. griseipennis Alexander, 1935
- O. guttipennis Alexander, 1940
- O. gymnoneura Alexander, 1935
- O. horai Alexander, 1927
- O. hypopygialis Alexander, 1935
- O. inornata Skuse, 1890
- O. javana de Meijere, 1913
- O. joana Alexander, 1926
- O. juvenilis (Zetterstedt, 1851)
- O. karnyi Edwards, 1923
- O. lactipennis Alexander, 1966
- O. lanei Alexander, 1942
- O. latissima Alexander, 1934
- O. longiventris Savchenko, 1974
- O. majuscula Alexander, 1940
- O. mashonensis Alexander, 1959
- O. melampodia Alexander, 1940
- O. melanopoda Alexander, 1976
- O. monilis Alexander, 1926
- O. multipunctata Alexander, 1938
- O. neogaudens Alexander, 1945
- O. nigroapicalis Alexander, 1941
- O. nimbicolor Alexander, 1970
- O. niveibasis Alexander, 1956
- O. niveitarsis Alexander, 1915
- O. nudivena Alexander, 1934
- O. omeina Alexander, 1930
- O. pachyrhyncha Alexander, 1968
- O. palauiana Alexander, 1940
- O. pallidibasis Alexander, 1921
- O. pandu Alexander, 1966
- O. papuicola Alexander, 1936
- O. parvipuncta Alexander, 1938
- O. peregrina Brunetti, 1912
- O. perextensa Alexander, 1972
- O. perpallens Alexander, 1964
- O. perpictula Alexander, 1930
- O. pictula Edwards, 1927
- O. platystyla Alexander, 1966
- O. plumbeithorax Alexander, 1955
- O. pruinosa Alexander, 1928
- O. punctipennis Alexander, 1914
- O. quadrilobata Alexander, 1932
- O. relicta Alexander, 1930
- O. resupina Alexander, 1966
- O. risbeci Alexander, 1934
- O. rubricolor Alexander, 1931
- O. rubrithorax Alexander, 1975
- O. sanctaeritae Alexander, 1946
- O. sanguinicolour Alexander, 1956
- O. sarophora Alexander, 1961
- O. sarophorodes Alexander, 1979
- O. saturnina Alexander, 1943
- O. scabriseta Alexander, 1938
- O. scotti Edwards, 1912
- O. seticosta Alexander, 1930
- O. setilobata Alexander, 1969
- O. sherpa Alexander, 1958
- O. similis Edwards, 1923
- O. soluta Alexander, 1948
- O. speciosa Alexander, 1953
- O. spiloptera Alexander, 1948
- O. stenotes Alexander, 1969
- O. streptocerca Alexander, 1936
- O. subbasalis Alexander, 1936
- O. subcostata Alexander, 1955
- O. subspeciosa Alexander, 1962
- O. subtartarus Alexander, 1946
- O. suspensa Alexander, 1973
- O. taiwanensis Alexander, 1924
- O. taprobanica Alexander, 1966
- O. tartarus Alexander, 1946
- O. tenuistyla Alexander, 1966
- O. tinguana Alexander, 1943
- O. toala Alexander, 1935
- O. transversalis Alexander, 1971
- O. trispinigera Alexander, 1945
- O. varuna Alexander, 1966
- O. virgo (Zetterstedt, 1851)
- O. wetmorei Alexander, 1920
- O. yakushimana Alexander, 1930
- O. zionensis Alexander, 1948

- Subgenus Protorimarga Alexander, 1930

- O. bequaertiana (Alexander, 1930)
