= Thrypticomyia =

Scientific classification
- Kingdom: Animalia
- Phylum: Arthropoda
- Class: Insecta
- Order: Diptera
- Family: Limoniidae
- Subfamily: Limnophilinae
- Genus: Thrypticomyia; Skuse, 1890

Type species
- Thaumastoptera aureipennis Skuse, 1890

Species
- See text

Genus of flies

Thrypticomyia is a genus of crane fly in the family Limoniidae.

== Species ==
- T. aclistia (Alexander, 1967)
- T. apicalis (Wiedemann, 1828)
- T. arachnophila (Alexander, 1927)
- T. arcus (Alexander, 1964)
- T. aureipennis Skuse, 1890
- T. basitarsatra (Alexander, 1948)
- T. bigeminata (Alexander, 1961)
- T. brevicuspis (Alexander, 1929)
- T. carissa (Alexander, 1948)
- T. carolinensis (Alexander, 1940)
- T. decussata (Alexander, 1972)
- T. dichaeta (Alexander, 1948)
- T. dichromogaster Edwards, 1927
- T. doddi (Alexander, 1921)
- T. estigmata (Alexander, 1967)
- T. fumidapicalis (Alexander, 1921)
- T. gizoensis (Alexander, 1978)
- T. marksae (Alexander, 1956)
- T. microstigma (Alexander, 1921)
- T. monocera (Alexander, 1927)
- T. multiseta (Alexander, 1961)
- T. nigeriensis (Alexander, 1921)
- T. niveitibia (Alexander, 1957)
- T. octosetosa (Alexander, 1931)
- T. ponapicola (Alexander, 1972)
- T. seychellensis Edwards, 1912
- T. sparsiseta (Alexander, 1947)
- T. spathulata (Alexander, 1936)
- T. spathulifera (Alexander, 1936)
- T. subsaltens (Alexander, 1924)
- T. tetrachaeta (Alexander, 1972)
- T. tinianensis (Alexander, 1972)
- T. trifusca (Alexander, 1948)
- T. unisetosa (Alexander, 1929)
- T. zimmermaniana (Alexander, 1947)
