= Araucoxenia =

Scientific classification
- Kingdom: Animalia
- Phylum: Arthropoda
- Class: Insecta
- Order: Diptera
- Family: Limoniidae
- Subfamily: Limnophilinae
- Genus: Araucoxenia; Alexander, 1969

Type species
- Araucoxenia paradoxa Alexander, 1969

Genus of flies

Araucoxenia is a genus of crane fly in the family Limoniidae. There is only one known species.

== Distribution ==
Chile

== Species ==
- Araucoxenia paradoxa Alexander, 1969
