= Limnorimarga =

Scientific classification
- Kingdom: Animalia
- Phylum: Arthropoda
- Class: Insecta
- Order: Diptera
- Family: Limoniidae
- Subfamily: Limnophilinae
- Genus: Limnorimarga; Alexander, 1945

Type species
- Orimarga limonioides Alexander, 1945

Species
- see text

Genus of flies

Limnorimarga is a genus of crane flies in the family Limoniidae.

== Distribution ==
Russian Far East, North Korea & Japan.

== Species ==
- L. limonioides (Alexander, 1921)
