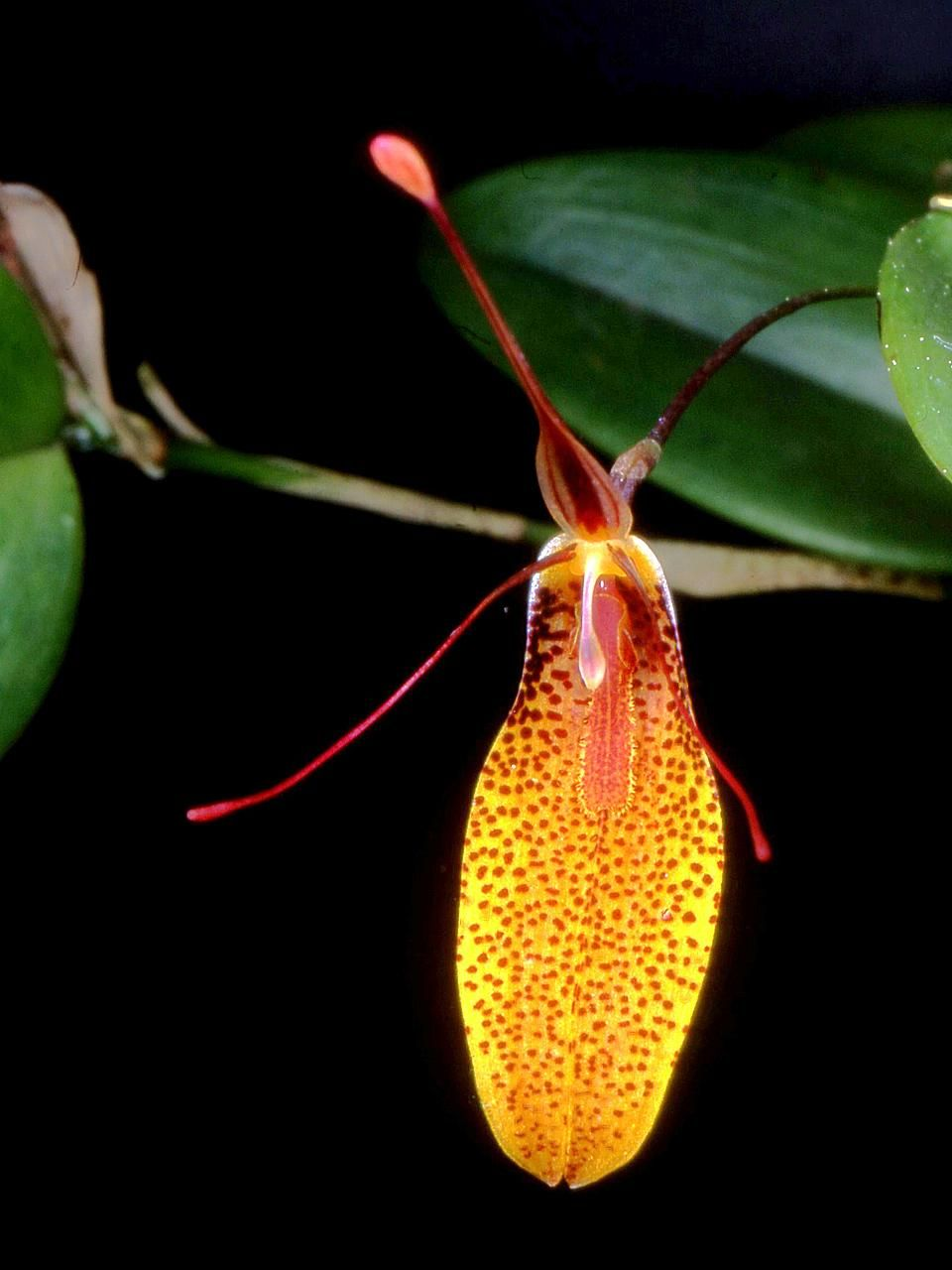
- Flower of Restrepia contorta

Scientific classification
- Kingdom: Plantae
- Clade: Tracheophytes
- Clade: Angiosperms
- Clade: Monocots
- Order: Asparagales
- Family: Orchidaceae
- Subfamily: Epidendroideae
- Genus: Restrepia
- Species: R. contorta

Binomial name
- Restrepia contorta (Ruiz & Pav.) Luer

Synonyms
- Humboldtia contorta Ruiz & Pav. (basionym); Stelis contorta (Ruiz & Pav.) Pers.; Restrepia maculata Lindl.; Restrepia punctulata Lindl.; Restrepia antennifera Lindl.; Restrepia pardina Lem.; Restrepia ecuadorensis Rolfe; Restrepia caucana Schltr.; Pleurothallis fimbrilabia C.Schweinf.; Restrepia apiculata Luer; Restrepia maculata ssp. ecuadoriensis (Rolfe) H.Mohr

= Restrepia contorta =

Species of orchid

Restrepia contorta, the twisted restrepia, is a species of orchid in the family Orchidaceae. It is endemic to western South America.
