= Collessophila =

Scientific classification
- Kingdom: Animalia
- Phylum: Arthropoda
- Clade: Pancrustacea
- Class: Insecta
- Order: Diptera
- Family: Limoniidae
- Subfamily: Limnophilinae
- Genus: Collessophila; Theischinger, 1994

Type species
- C. chookachooka Theischinger, 1994

Species
- See text

Genus of flies

Collessophila is a genus of crane fly in the family Limoniidae. There is only one known species. The epithet commemorates Australian entomologist Donald Henry Colless

== Distribution ==
Queensland, Australia.

== Species ==
- C. chookachooka Theischinger, 1994
