= Protohelius =

Scientific classification
- Kingdom: Animalia
- Phylum: Arthropoda
- Class: Insecta
- Order: Diptera
- Family: Limoniidae
- Subfamily: Limnophilinae
- Genus: Protohelius; Alexander, 1928

Type species
- Protohelius issikii Alexander, 1928

Species
- see text

Genus of flies

Protohelius is a genus of crane fly in the family Limoniidae.

== Distribution ==
Venezuela, Ecuador, India, China & Taiwan

== Species ==
- P. cisatlanticus Alexander, 1938
- P. issikii Alexander, 1928
- P. khasicus Alexander, 1964
- P. nigricolor Alexander, 1940
- P. nilgiricus Alexander, 1960
- P. tinkhami Alexander, 1938
- P. venezolanus Alexander, 1950
