= Atypophthalmus =

Scientific classification
- Kingdom: Animalia
- Phylum: Arthropoda
- Class: Insecta
- Order: Diptera
- Family: Limoniidae
- Subfamily: Limnophilinae
- Genus: Atypophthalmus; Brunetti, 1911

Type species
- Atypophthalmus holopticus Brunetti, 1911 [= umbratus (de Meijere, 1911)]

Subgenera
- Atypophthalmus Brunetti, 1911; Microlimonia Savchenko, 1976

Genus of flies

Atypophthalmus is a genus of crane fly in the family Limoniidae.

== Species ==
- Subgenus Atypophthalmus Brunetti, 1911
  - A. andringitrae (Alexander, 1965)
  - A. barthelemyi (Alexander, 1923)
  - A. bilobatus (Alexander, 1955)
  - A. bobyensis (Alexander, 1965)
  - A. bourbonensis (Alexander, 1957)
  - A. comoricola (Alexander, 1979)
  - A. crinitus (Alexander, 1924)
  - A. densifimbriatus (Alexander, 1955)
  - A. emaceratus (Alexander, 1921)
  - A. flavopyga (Alexander, 1921)
  - A. fuscopleura (Alexander, 1920)
  - A. gausapa (Alexander, 1972)
  - A. gurneyanus (Alexander, 1972)
  - A. hovamendicus (Alexander, 1955)
  - A. infixus (Walker, 1865)
  - A. inusitatellus (Alexander, 1964)
  - A. inustus (Meigen, 1818)
  - A. kurma (Alexander, 1966)
  - A. languidus (Alexander, 1934)
  - A. mahensis (Edwards, 1912)
  - A. marleyi (Alexander, 1917)
  - A. mauritianus (Alexander, 1956)
  - A. mendicus (Alexander, 1921)
  - A. mjobergi (Edwards, 1926)
  - A. multisetosus Savchenko, 1983
  - A. parvapiculatus (Alexander, 1973)
  - A. patritus (Alexander, 1956)
  - A. patulus (Alexander, 1932)
  - A. pendleburyi (Edwards, 1928)
  - A. perreductus (Alexander, 1941)
  - A. polypogon (Alexander, 1970)
  - A. prodigiosus (Alexander, 1979)
  - A. quinquevittatus (Santos Abreu, 1923)
  - A. sedatus (Alexander, 1922)
  - A. segnis (Alexander, 1955)
  - A. seychellanus (Alexander, 1956)
  - A. stylacanthus (Alexander, 1971)
  - A. submendicus (Alexander, 1921)
  - A. tamborinus (Alexander, 1930)
  - A. taoensis (Hynes, 1993)
  - A. thaumastopyga (Alexander, 1961)
  - A. thomasseti (Edwards, 1912)
  - A. umbratus (de Meijere, 1911)
  - A. vinsoni (Alexander, 1954)
- Subgenus Microlimonia Savchenko, 1976
  - A. bicorniger (Alexander, 1932)
  - A. egressus (Alexander, 1938)
  - A. inelegans (Alexander, 1924)
  - A. machidai (Alexander, 1921)
  - A. omogoensis (Alexander, 1954)
