= Amphilimnobia =

Scientific classification
- Kingdom: Animalia
- Phylum: Arthropoda
- Class: Insecta
- Order: Diptera
- Family: Limoniidae
- Subfamily: Limnophilinae
- Genus: Amphilimnobia; Alexander, 1920

Type species
- Amphilimnobia leucopeza Alexander, 1920

Species
- see text

Genus of flies

Amphilimnobia is a genus of crane fly in the family Limoniidae.

== Species ==
- A. leucopeza Alexander, 1920
