= List of Limonia species =

This is a list of 436 species in Limonia, a genus of limoniid crane flies in the family Limoniidae.

== Limonia species ==
- Limonia acaenophora Alexander, 1978^{c g}
- Limonia acerba Alexander, 1943^{i}
- Limonia achates Alexander, 1972^{c g}
- Limonia acinacis Alexander, 1965^{c g}
- Limonia acinomeca Alexander, 1968^{i}
- Limonia acutissima Alexander, 1968^{c g}
- Limonia adirondacensis (Alexander, 1922)^{i}
- Limonia advena Alexander^{i g}
- Limonia affinis (Zetterstedt, 1838)^{w}
- Limonia alascaensis (Alexander, 1919)^{i}
- Limonia albifrons (Meigen, 1818)^{c g}
- Limonia albipes (Senior-White, 1924)^{c g}
- Limonia alboangusta Alexander, 1972^{c g}
- Limonia alienata Alexander, 1948^{c g}
- Limonia alopecura Alexander, 1935^{c g}
- Limonia alpicola (Lackschewitz, 1928)^{w}
- Limonia amabilis amabilis Alexander, 1924^{w}
- Limonia amabilis antistes Alexander, 1938^{w}
- Limonia amabilis Alexander, 1924^{c g}
- Limonia amblymera Alexander, 1967^{c g}
- Limonia amicula (Alexander, 1921)^{c g}
- Limonia analis (Meigen, 1818)^{w}
- Limonia angulosa Alexander, 1966^{c g}
- Limonia annulata Linnaeus, 1758^{i c g b}
- Limonia annulus (Meigen)^{i}
- Limonia anteapicalis Alexander, 1946^{i}
- Limonia anteterminalis Alexander, 1965^{c g}
- Limonia anthracina (Alexander, 1922)^{c}
- Limonia apicalis ^{g}
- Limonia apicata (Alexander)^{i g}
- Limonia apiceglabra Alexander, 1968^{i}
- Limonia aquilina Stary, 1984^{c g}
- Limonia aquita (Dietz, 1915)^{i}
- Limonia argenteceps (Alexander, 1912)^{i}
- Limonia argopoda Alexander, 1960^{c g}
- Limonia arthritica Alexander, 1936^{c g}
- Limonia atayal Alexander, 1929^{g}
- Limonia athabascae (Alexander, 1927)^{i}
- Limonia atnitta Theischinger, 1994^{c g}
- Limonia atridorsum (Alexander, 1920)^{c g}
- Limonia atrisoma Alexander, 1940^{c g}
- Limonia atroaurata Alexander, 1931^{c g}
- Limonia atwatye Theischinger, 2000^{c g}
- Limonia aureolenta Alexander, 1948^{c g}
- Limonia ayodhya Alexander, 1966^{c g}
- Limonia badia (Walker, 1848)^{i c g}
- Limonia bagobo Alexander, 1931^{c g}
- Limonia bidens Savchenko, 1979^{c g}
- Limonia bifaria Alexander, 1965^{c g}
- Limonia bilan Alexander, 1931^{c g}
- Limonia bilobulifera Alexander, 1931^{c g}
- Limonia bipendula Alexander, 1978^{c g}
- Limonia bistigma (Coquillett, 1905)^{i c g}
- Limonia borealis (Doane, 1900)^{i c g}
- Limonia bougainvilleana Alexander, 1971^{c g}
- Limonia brachylabis Alexander, 1965^{c g}
- Limonia brevivena (Osten Sacken, 1969)^{i}
- Limonia brevivenula Alexander, 1929^{i}
- Limonia brunettiella Alexander, 1929^{c g}
- Limonia brunnea (Doane, 1900)^{i g}
- Limonia bryaniana Alexander, 1929^{c g}
- Limonia bryanti (Johnson, 1909)^{i}
- Limonia cairnensis (Alexander, 1921)^{c}
- Limonia calcarifera Alexander, 1936^{c g}
- Limonia californica (Osten Sacken, 1861)^{i}
- Limonia canadensis (Westwood, 1835)^{i}
- Limonia catalinae Alexander, 1944^{i}
- Limonia caucasica Lackschewitz, 1940^{c g}
- Limonia cervina (Doane, 1908)^{i}
- Limonia chaseni Edwards, 1933^{c g}
- Limonia chillcotti Alexander, 1968^{i}
- Limonia chorea (Meigen, 1818)^{i}
- Limonia cinctipes Say^{i b}
- Limonia cinctiventris (Brunetti, 1912)^{c g}
- Limonia citrina (Doane, 1900)^{i}
- Limonia citrofocalis (Edwards, 1926)^{c g}
- Limonia clitelligera Alexander, 1929^{g}
- Limonia commelina Alexander, 1946^{i}
- Limonia communis (Osten Sacken, 1859)^{i b}
- Limonia confinis (Brunetti, 1918)^{w}
- Limonia congesta Alexander, 1967^{c g}
- Limonia costalis (Wiedemann, 1824)^{c g}
- Limonia cramptoniana Alexander, 1929^{i g}
- Limonia ctenopyga Alexander, 1943^{i}
- Limonia dactylolabis (Alexander, 1921)^{c g}
- Limonia dampfi (Alexander, 1925)^{i g}
- Limonia deceptor Alexander, 1956^{c g}
- Limonia decurvans Alexander, 1959^{c g}
- Limonia defuncta (Osten Sacken, 1859)^{i}
- Limonia desiderata Alexander, 1932^{c g}
- Limonia devata Alexander, 1965^{c g}
- Limonia dietziana Alexander, 1927^{i}
- Limonia dilutior (Edwards, 1921)^{c g}
- Limonia dilutissima Alexander, 1933^{c g}
- Limonia dipinax Alexander, 1948^{c g}
- Limonia distans (Psten Sacken, 1859)^{i}
- Limonia distincta (Doane, 1900)^{i}
- Limonia distivena Alexander, 1935^{c g}
- Limonia diversoides (Dietz, 1921)^{i g}
- Limonia divisa Alexander, 1929^{i}
- Limonia domestica Osten Sacken, 1859^{i g b}
- Limonia dreisbachi Alexander, 1965^{i}
- Limonia duplicata (Doane, 1900)^{i b}
- Limonia ectopa Alexander, 1967^{c g}
- Limonia edax Alexander, 1961^{c g}
- Limonia edura Alexander, 1935^{c g}
- Limonia egesta Alexander, 1948^{c g}
- Limonia elephantella Alexander, 1972^{c g}
- Limonia elephantina Alexander, 1940^{c g}
- Limonia enormis Stary, 2017^{w}
- Limonia eos Stary and Savchenko, 1976^{c g}
- Limonia episema Alexander, 1924^{c g}
- Limonia erugata Alexander, 1978^{c g}
- Limonia esakii (Alexander, 1922)^{c}
- Limonia evittata (Edwards, 1926)^{c g}
- Limonia exosa Alexander, 1930^{w}
- Limonia expedita Alexander, 1936^{c g}
- Limonia fallax (Johnson, 1909)^{i}
- Limonia festiva (Brunetti, 1912)^{c g}
- Limonia fidelis Osten Sacken^{i g}
- Limonia filicauda (Alexander, 1925)^{i}
- Limonia firestonei Alexander, 1930^{c g}
- Limonia flavescens (Macquart, 1834)^{w}
- Limonia flavipes (Fabricius, 1787)^{c g}
- Limonia flavoterminalis (Alexander, 1922)^{c g}
- Limonia floridana (Osten Sacken, 1869)^{i}
- Limonia fraudulenta Alexander, 1928^{c g}
- Limonia fullowayi (Alexander, 1915)^{g}
- Limonia fulva (Doane, 1900)^{i}
- Limonia fusca Meigen, 1804^{i}
- Limonia fusciceps Alexander, 1924^{c g}
- Limonia fuscofemorata (von Roser, 1840)^{w}
- Limonia garoana Oosterbroek, 2009^{c g}
- Limonia gaspicola Alexander, 1941^{i}
- Limonia geronimo Alexander, 1949^{i}
- Limonia geyserensis Alexander, 1943^{i}
- Limonia gibsoni (Alexander, 1929)^{i}
- Limonia gissarica Savchenko, 1979^{c g}
- Limonia gladiator (Osten Sacken, 1859)^{i}
- Limonia globithorax (Osten Sacken, 1969)^{i}
- Limonia goodenoughensis Alexander, 1978^{c g}
- Limonia gracilis (Wiedemann, 1828)^{w}
- Limonia graciosa Alexander, 1978^{c g}
- Limonia grimshawi (Alexander)^{i}
- Limonia guatemalensis (Alexander, 1916)^{i}
- Limonia guerrernesis Alexander, 1916^{i g}
- Limonia habra Alexander, 1972^{c g}
- Limonia haeretica (Osten Sacken, 1869)^{i}
- Limonia halterata (Osten Sacken, 1869)^{i}
- Limonia halterella (Edwards, 1921)^{i}
- Limonia hardyana (Byers, 1985)
- Limonia hartveldae Stary, 2017^{w}
- Limonia hawaiiensis (Grimshaw)^{i}
- Limonia hebridicola Alexander, 1948^{c g}
- Limonia helva (Doane, 1900)^{i g}
- Limonia hera Alexander, 1948^{c g}
- Limonia hercegovinae (Strobl, 1898)^{c g}
- Limonia hians Alexander, 1967^{c g}
- Limonia homichlophila Alexander, 1958^{i}
- Limonia hostilis Alexander, 1933^{c g}
- Limonia huachucensis Alexander, 1955^{i}
- Limonia hudsonica (Osten Sacken, 1861)^{i b}
- Limonia humidicola (Osten Sacken, 1859)^{i b}
- Limonia ibis (Alexander, 1916)^{i}
- Limonia illustris Alexander, 1944^{i}
- Limonia immanis Alexander, 1950^{i}
- Limonia immatura (Osten Sacken, 1859)^{i b}
- Limonia immodesta (Osten Sacken, 1859)^{i}
- Limonia immodestoides Alexander, 1919^{i g}
- Limonia inconsiderata Alexander, 1956^{c g}
- Limonia indigena indigena (Osten Sacken, 1860)^{w}
- Limonia indigena jacksoni (Alexander, 1917)^{w}
- Limonia indigena loloensis Alexander, 1958^{w}
- Limonia indigena Osten Sacken^{i c g b}
- Limonia indigenoides (Alexander, 1920)^{i}
- Limonia infantula Edwards, 1931^{c g}
- Limonia infausta Alexander, 1930^{c g}
- Limonia infuscata (Doane, 1900)^{i}
- Limonia inhabilis Alexander, 1949^{i}
- Limonia iniquispina Hardy^{i}
- Limonia innoxia Alexander, 1968^{i}
- Limonia insitiva Alexander, 1951^{c g}
- Limonia insolabilis Alexander, 1946^{i}
- Limonia interjecta Stary, 1974^{c g}
- Limonia intermedia Garrett, 1922^{i g}
- Limonia intricata (Alexander, 1927)^{i}
- Limonia involuta Alexander, 1968^{i}
- Limonia iowensis Alexander, 1927^{i g}
- Limonia iridescens (Edwards, 1912)^{c g}
- Limonia isabellina (Doane, 1900)^{i}
- Limonia jacobus (Alexander)^{i}
- Limonia japonica (Alexander, 1913)^{c}
- Limonia juvenca Alexander, 1935^{c g}
- Limonia karafutonis Alexander, 1924^{c g}
- Limonia kashmirica (Edwards, 1927)^{c g}
- Limonia kauaiensis (Grimshaw)^{i}
- Limonia kernensis Alexander, 1966^{i}
- Limonia knabi (Alexander, 1912)^{i}
- Limonia kraussi Alexander^{i g}
- Limonia kumbu Theischinger, 1994^{c g}
- Limonia kuschei Alexander, 1958^{i c g}
- Limonia labuana Edwards, 1931^{c g}
- Limonia lackschewitziana Alexander, 1933^{c g}
- Limonia lacroixi (Alexander, 1926)^{i}
- Limonia laistes Alexander, 1967^{i}
- Limonia lateroflava Alexander, 1971^{c g}
- Limonia lateromacula Edwards, 1933^{c g}
- Limonia latiorflava Alexander, 1966^{c g}
- Limonia latipennis (Macquart, 1834)^{w}
- Limonia laufferi (Strobl, 1906)^{w}
- Limonia lecontei Alexander, 1940^{i}
- Limonia liberta (Osten Sacken, 1859)^{i b}
- Limonia libertoides (Alexander, 1912)^{i}
- Limonia lindbergi Nielsen, 1962^{c g}
- Limonia linsdalei Alexander, 1943^{i}
- Limonia livida (Say, 1829)^{i}
- Limonia longeantennata Alexander, 1936^{c g}
- Limonia longipennis (Schummel, 1829)^{i}
- Limonia longivena (Edwards, 1911)^{c g}
- Limonia luteipostica Alexander, 1965^{c g}
- Limonia luteivittata Alexander, 1930^{c g}
- Limonia lyssa Alexander, 1967^{c g}
- Limonia macateei (Alexander, 1916)^{i c g}
- Limonia macrostigma (Schummel, 1829)^{c g}
- Limonia maculata (Meigen, 1804 )^{b}
- Limonia maculicosta (Coquillett, 1905)^{i c g}
- Limonia maculipennis (Meigen, 1818)^{c g}
- Limonia marginata (Macquart, 1826)^{w}
- Limonia marginepunctata (von Roser, 1840)^{w}
- Limonia marmorata Osten Sacken, 1861^{i b}
- Limonia masoni (Edwards, 1921)^{w}
- Limonia melanocera (Alexander, 1925)^{i}
- Limonia melleicauda (Alexander, 1917)^{i}
- Limonia messaurea boreoorientalis Savchenko, 1987^{w}
- Limonia messaurea Mendl, 1971^{c g}
- Limonia metatarsalba (Alexander, 1923)^{c g}
- Limonia michigana Alexander, 1950^{i}
- Limonia microlabis (Edwards, 1926)^{c g}
- Limonia micropyga Alexander, 1954^{c g}
- Limonia modesta (Meigen, 1818)^{i}
- Limonia moniliformis (Doane, 1900)^{i}
- Limonia monilis Alexander, 1932^{c g}
- Limonia morioides (Osten Sacken, 1860)^{i}
- Limonia mouicola Alexander, 1948^{c g}
- Limonia murcida Alexander, 1967^{c g}
- Limonia murina (Zetterstedt, 1851)^{i}
- Limonia nebulinervis Alexander, 1966^{c g}
- Limonia nebulosa (Zetterstedt, 1838)^{w}
- Limonia negativa Edwards, 1933^{c g}
- Limonia nelliana (Alexander, 1914)^{i}
- Limonia nemoralis Savchenko, 1983^{c g}
- Limonia neoelegans Alexander, 1954^{i}
- Limonia neoindigena Alexander, 1924^{c g}
- Limonia neomorio (Alexander, 1927)^{i}
- Limonia neonebulosa Alexander, 1924^{i}
- Limonia nielseniana Alexander, 1949^{i}
- Limonia nifrithorax (Brunetti, 1912)^{g}
- Limonia nigrella Alexander, 1929^{c g}
- Limonia nigrescens (Lackschewitz, 1928)^{w}
- Limonia nigricans Alexander, 1929^{w}
- Limonia nigricuspis Alexander, 1938^{w}
- Limonia nigrirostris (Gimmerthal, 1847)^{w}
- Limonia nigroclavata Alexander, 1942^{i}
- Limonia nigronitida Alexander, 1923^{w}
- Limonia nigropolita (Alexander)^{i g}
- Limonia nigropunctata intermixta Savchenko, 1976^{w}
- Limonia nigropunctata (Schummel, 1829)^{c g}
- Limonia nitida (Verrall, 1886)^{w}
- Limonia nitobei (Edwards, 1916)^{c g}
- Limonia niveipes (Brunetti, 1912)^{c g}
- Limonia nominata Alexander, 1936^{c g}
- Limonia novaeangliae Alexander, 1929^{i b}
- Limonia nubeculosa Meigen, 1804^{c g}
- Limonia nussbaumi Stary and Freidberg, 2007^{c g}
- Limonia nycteris (Alexander, 1927)^{i}
- Limonia obsoleta (Meigen, 1818)^{w}
- Limonia obtusistyla Alexander, 1925^{i}
- Limonia ocellata (von Roder, 1886)^{c g}
- Limonia omniflava Alexander, 1936^{c g}
- Limonia oosterbroeki Stary, 2017^{w}
- Limonia opacipennis Stary, 2017^{w}
- Limonia orthorhabda Alexander, 1940^{i}
- Limonia ozarkensis Alexander, 1968^{i}
- Limonia pabulina (Meigen, 1818)^{g}
- Limonia pacata Alexander, 1930^{c g}
- Limonia pacatella Alexander, 1934^{c g}
- Limonia pacatina Edwards, 1933^{c g}
- Limonia paitae Alexander, 1948^{w}
- Limonia pallida (Macquart, 1838)^{w}
- Limonia pallidipleura Alexander, 1924^{c g}
- Limonia pannonica (Kowarz, 1868)^{c g}
- Limonia parapentheres Alexander, 1948^{i}
- Limonia parietina (Osten Sacken, 1861)^{i c g b}
- Limonia particeps (Doane, 1908)^{i}
- Limonia parvipennis Alexander, 1940^{c g}
- Limonia parvispiculata Alexander, 1934^{c g}
- Limonia pennsylvanica (Dietz, 1921)^{i g}
- Limonia penumbrata Edwards, 1932^{c g}
- Limonia peramabilis Alexander, 1967^{c g}
- Limonia perbeata Alexander, 1938^{c g}
- Limonia perdistincta Alexander, 1979^{c g}
- Limonia perextensa Alexander, 1971^{c g}
- Limonia perfecta (Alexander, 1928)^{i}
- Limonia perissoptera Alexander, 1962^{c g}
- Limonia perkinsi (Grimshaw)^{i g}
- Limonia pernigrina Alexander, 1938^{c g}
- Limonia pernodosa Alexander, 1965^{c g}
- Limonia perproducta Alexander, 1967^{c g}
- Limonia perserena Alexander, 1946^{i}
- Limonia phalangioides Alexander, 1943^{i}
- Limonia phragmitidis (Schrank, 1781)^{c g}
- Limonia pia Podenas and Podeniene, 2017^{w}
- Limonia pilosicaudata Alexander, 1931^{c g}
- Limonia piscataquis Alexander, 1941^{i}
- Limonia platyptera (Macquart, 1826)^{w}
- Limonia platyterga Alexander, 1956^{c g}
- Limonia pondoensis Alexander, 1930^{c g}
- Limonia praepostera (Alexander, 1925)^{i}
- Limonia pristomera Alexander, 1972^{c}
- Limonia procericornis Alexander, 1978^{c g}
- Limonia profunda (Alexander, 1925)^{i}
- Limonia prolixicornis Alexander, 1931^{c g}
- Limonia prolixisetosa Alexander, 1971^{c g}
- Limonia pronotalis Alexander, 1931^{c g}
- Limonia propior Alexander, 1963^{c g}
- Limonia proxima Kuntze, 1920^{w}
- Limonia prudentia Alexander, 1935^{c g}
- Limonia pubipennis Osten Sacken^{i g}
- Limonia pudica (Osten Sacken, 1859)^{i}
- Limonia pudicoides Alexander, 1929^{i}
- Limonia pullata aquila Savchenko, 1983^{w}
- Limonia pullata Alexander, 1924^{c g}
- Limonia punctigera (Walker, 1856)^{w}
- Limonia pygmea (Macquart, 1838)^{c g}
- Limonia quantilla Alexander, 1934^{c g}
- Limonia raiateaae Alexander, 1947^{c g}
- Limonia rantaiensis Alexander, 1929^{c g}
- Limonia rapida Alexander, 1946^{i}
- Limonia rara (Osten Sacken, 1869)^{i}
- Limonia ravida (Alexander, 1925)^{i}
- Limonia reticulata (Alexander, 1912)^{i}
- Limonia rostrata (Say, 1823)^{i b}
- Limonia rostrifera (Osten Sacken, 1869)^{i}
- Limonia sanguinea (Doleschall, 1857)^{c g}
- Limonia sannionis Alexander, 1967^{c g}
- Limonia scabristyla Alexander, 1968^{i}
- Limonia schwarzi (Alexander, 1912)^{i}
- Limonia sciophila (Osten Sacken, 1877)^{w}
- Limonia serandi (Alexander, 1919)^{c g}
- Limonia serpula Alexander, 1967^{c g}
- Limonia sexnotata (Schummel, 1829)^{w}
- Limonia sexpunctata (Fabricius, 1781)^{w}
- Limonia shannoni Alexander^{i g b}
- Limonia shelfordi Alexander, 1944^{i}
- Limonia shushna Alexander, 1952^{c g}
- Limonia simulans (Walker, 1848)^{i}
- Limonia sociabilis (Osten Sacken, 1869)^{i c g}
- Limonia solitaria (Osten Sacken, 1869)^{i}
- Limonia soradida (Brunetti, 1912)^{g}
- Limonia sphagnicola (Alexander, 1925)^{i}
- Limonia spinifera (Alexander, 1927)^{i}
- Limonia splendens Kuntze, 1920^{c g}
- Limonia stenolabis Alexander, 1965^{c g}
- Limonia stigma (Meigen, 1818)^{c g}
- Limonia stigmata (Doane, 1900)^{i}
- Limonia stoneri Alexander, 1925^{c g}
- Limonia striopleura (Edwards, 1919)^{c g}
- Limonia stulta (Osten Sacken, 1859)^{i}
- Limonia stygipennis (Alexander)^{i}
- Limonia subaequalis Savchenko, 1979^{c g}
- Limonia subhostilis Alexander, 1935^{c g}
- Limonia submurcida Alexander, 1968^{c g}
- Limonia subnubeculosa (Alexander, 1920)^{w}
- Limonia subpacata Alexander, 1931^{c g}
- Limonia subprolixa Alexander, 1931^{c g}
- Limonia sudetica Czizek, 1931^{w}
- Limonia suffusca (Garrett, 1922)^{i}
- Limonia swezeyi (Alexander)^{i}
- Limonia sylvicola (Schummel, 1829)^{c g}
- Limonia synempora Alexander, 1933^{c g}
- Limonia syrma Alexander, 1978^{c g}
- Limonia tagax Alexander, 1954^{c g}
- Limonia talungensis Alexander, 1971^{c g}
- Limonia tanakai (Alexander, 1921)^{c g}
- Limonia tanyrhyncha Alexander, 1965^{c g}
- Limonia tattakae Alexander, 1923^{g}
- Limonia taurica (Strobl, 1895)^{c g}
- Limonia terraenovae Alexander, 1920^{i g}
- Limonia terrestris (Linnaeus, 1758)^{w}
- Limonia tessellatipennis Alexander, 1936^{c g}
- Limonia thaleitrichia Alexander, 1979^{c g}
- Limonia thanatos Alexander, 1949^{c g}
- Limonia tigriventris Alexander, 1968^{c g}
- Limonia triarmata Alexander, 1930^{g}
- Limonia tributaria Alexander, 1943^{w}
- Limonia tricornis Alexander^{i g}
- Limonia triocellata (Osten Sacken, 1859)^{i b}
- Limonia triphaea (Alexander, 1954)^{b}
- Limonia tripunctata (Zetterstedt, 1838)^{w}
- Limonia tristigma (Osten Sacken, 1860)^{w}
- Limonia trivittata (Schummel, 1829)^{c g}
- Limonia turpis (Walker, 1856)^{w}
- Limonia tuta Alexander, 1935^{c g}
- Limonia ubensis Alexander, 1930^{c g}
- Limonia uinta Alexander, 1948^{i}
- Limonia uliginosa Alexander, 1929^{i g}
- Limonia umbrata (Brunetti, 1911)^{g}
- Limonia uniaculeata Alexander, 1956^{c g}
- Limonia unimaculata (Macquart, 1826)^{w}
- Limonia vaillanti Thomas, 1968^{w}
- Limonia vajra Alexander, 1958^{c g}
- Limonia valverdensis Alexander, 1946^{i}
- Limonia vanduzeei (Alexander, 1916)^{i}
- Limonia variabilis (Grimshaw)^{i}
- Limonia varipes (Dietz, 1921)^{w}
- Limonia venerabilis Alexander, 1938^{w}
- Limonia venustula (Alexander, 1921)^{c}
- Limonia vibhishana Alexander, 1965^{c g}
- Limonia virescens (Loew, 1851)^{i}
- Limonia viridicolor Alexander, 1955^{c g}
- Limonia viridula (Alexander, 1922)^{g}
- Limonia viticola Alexander, 1978^{c g}
- Limonia vitripennis (Brunetti, 1912)^{w}
- Limonia vormanni (Westhoff, 1882)^{w}
- Limonia vulgata (Bergroth, 1888)^{i}
- Limonia walleyi Alexander, 1942^{i}
- Limonia whartoni (Needham, 1908)^{i}
- Limonia willamettensis Alexander, 1949^{i}
- Limonia woosnami (Alexander, 1920)^{c g}
- Limonia yakushimensis Alexander, 1930^{c g}
- Limonia yapicola Alexander, 1972^{c g}
- Limonia yellowstonensis Alexander, 1945^{i c g}
- Limonia yeranda Theischinger, 1994^{c g}
- Limonia ypsilon Alexander, 1959^{i}
- Limonia zebrina Savchenko, 1979^{w}
- Limonia zionana Alexander, 1948^{i}
- Limonia zwicki Devyatkov, 2012^{c g}

Data sources: i = ITIS, c = Catalogue of Life, g = GBIF, b = Bugguide.net, w = Catalogue of the Craneflies of the World

Species with uncertain placement in Limonia

- Limonia arthritica Alexander, 1936
- Limonia atroaurata Alexander, 1931
- Limonia bilan Alexander, 1931
- Limonia calcarifera Alexander, 1936
- Limonia chaseni Edwards, 1933
- Limonia congesta Alexander, 1967
- Limonia costalis (Wiedemann, 1824)
- Limonia dactylolabis (Alexander, 1921)
- Limonia desiderata Alexander, 1932
- Limonia flavoterminalis (Alexander, 1922)
- Limonia iridescens (Edwards, 1912)
- Limonia kuschei Alexander, 1958
- Limonia latiorflava Alexander, 1966
- Limonia longivena (Edwards, 1911)
- Limonia luteipostica Alexander, 1965
- Limonia luteivittata Alexander, 1930
- Limonia monilis Alexander, 1932
- Limonia multinodulosa Alexander, 1930
- Limonia negativa Edwards, 1933
- Limonia ocellata (von Roder, 1886)
- Limonia parvispiculata Alexander, 1934
- Limonia pernodosa Alexander, 1965
- Limonia pilosicaudata Alexander, 1931
- Limonia pondoensis Alexander, 1930
- Limonia pygmea (Macquart, 1838)
- Limonia sanguinea (Doleschall, 1857)
- Limonia shushna Alexander, 1952
- Limonia thanatos Alexander, 1949
- Limonia tigriventris Alexander, 1968
- Limonia tuta Alexander, 1935
- Limonia vibhishana Alexander, 1965
- Limonia viridicolor Alexander, 1955
- Limonia yellowstonensis Alexander, 1945
