= Limonia hudsonica =

Scientific classification
- Domain: Eukaryota
- Kingdom: Animalia
- Phylum: Arthropoda
- Class: Insecta
- Order: Diptera
- Family: Limoniidae
- Tribe: Limoniini
- Genus: Limonia
- Species: L. hudsonica

Binomial name
- Limonia hudsonica (Osten Sacken, 1861)

Synonyms
- Limnobia hudsonica Osten Sacken, 1861

Species of fly

Limonia hudsonica is a species of limoniid crane fly in the family Limoniidae.
