= Limonia =

Limonia can mean:

Living things

- Limonia (fly), an insect genus
- Limonia (plant), a flowering plant genus

Other

- Limonia (food), an Italian recipe
