= Limonia humidicola =

Scientific classification
- Domain: Eukaryota
- Kingdom: Animalia
- Phylum: Arthropoda
- Class: Insecta
- Order: Diptera
- Family: Limoniidae
- Tribe: Limoniini
- Genus: Limonia
- Species: L. humidicola

Binomial name
- Limonia humidicola (Osten Sacken, 1859)

Synonyms
- Dicranomyia humidicola Osten Sacken; Dicranomyia viridicans Doane, 1908

Species of fly

Limonia humidicola is a species of limoniid crane fly in the family Limoniidae. It can be found in Southern Canada, across the United States, and into Central America, commonly in shady, wet areas along streams.

== Description ==
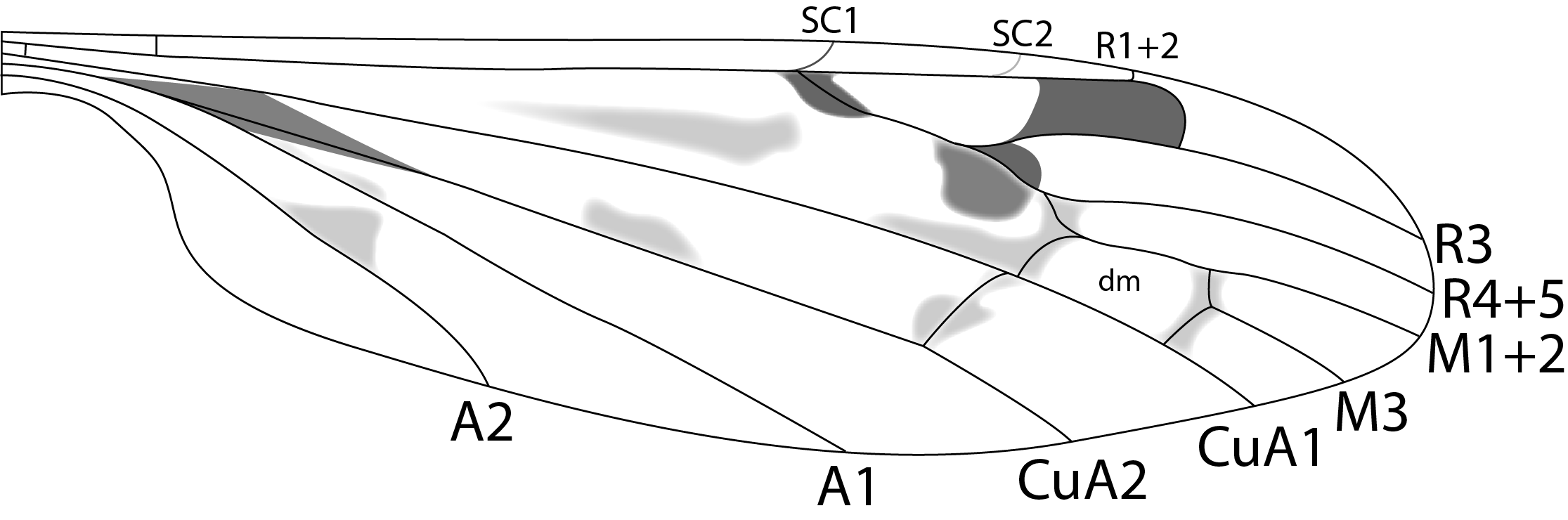
Wing diagram of Limonia humidicola.

Adult flies are medium to small for crane flies, with a body typically 7-8mm in length. The body is mostly dark brown, though the abdomen exhibits alternating dark brown and tannish-yellow striping. Between the mesonotal prescutum and the scutum there is a V-shaped suture distinctive to all Limoniinae. Wings show pale brown clouds in basal cells, along with a number of darkened patches, including three notably visible patches near the tip of the wing. Legs are brown with pale yellow joints.
