= Helius flavipes =

Scientific classification
- Kingdom: Animalia
- Phylum: Arthropoda
- Class: Insecta
- Order: Diptera
- Family: Limoniidae
- Tribe: Limoniini
- Genus: Helius
- Species: H. flavipes

Binomial name
- Helius flavipes (Macquart, 1855)

Synonyms
- Limnobia prominens Walker, 1856; Rhamphidia brevirostris Osten Sacken, 1859; Rhamphidia flavipes Macquart, 1855

Species of fly

Helius flavipes is a species of limoniid crane flies in the family Limoniidae.
