= Limonia parietina =

Scientific classification
- Domain: Eukaryota
- Kingdom: Animalia
- Phylum: Arthropoda
- Class: Insecta
- Order: Diptera
- Family: Limoniidae
- Tribe: Limoniini
- Genus: Limonia
- Species: L. parietina

Binomial name
- Limonia parietina (Osten Sacken, 1861)

Synonyms
- Limnobia parietina Osten Sacken, 1861

Species of fly

Limonia parietina is a species of limoniid crane fly in the family Limoniidae.
