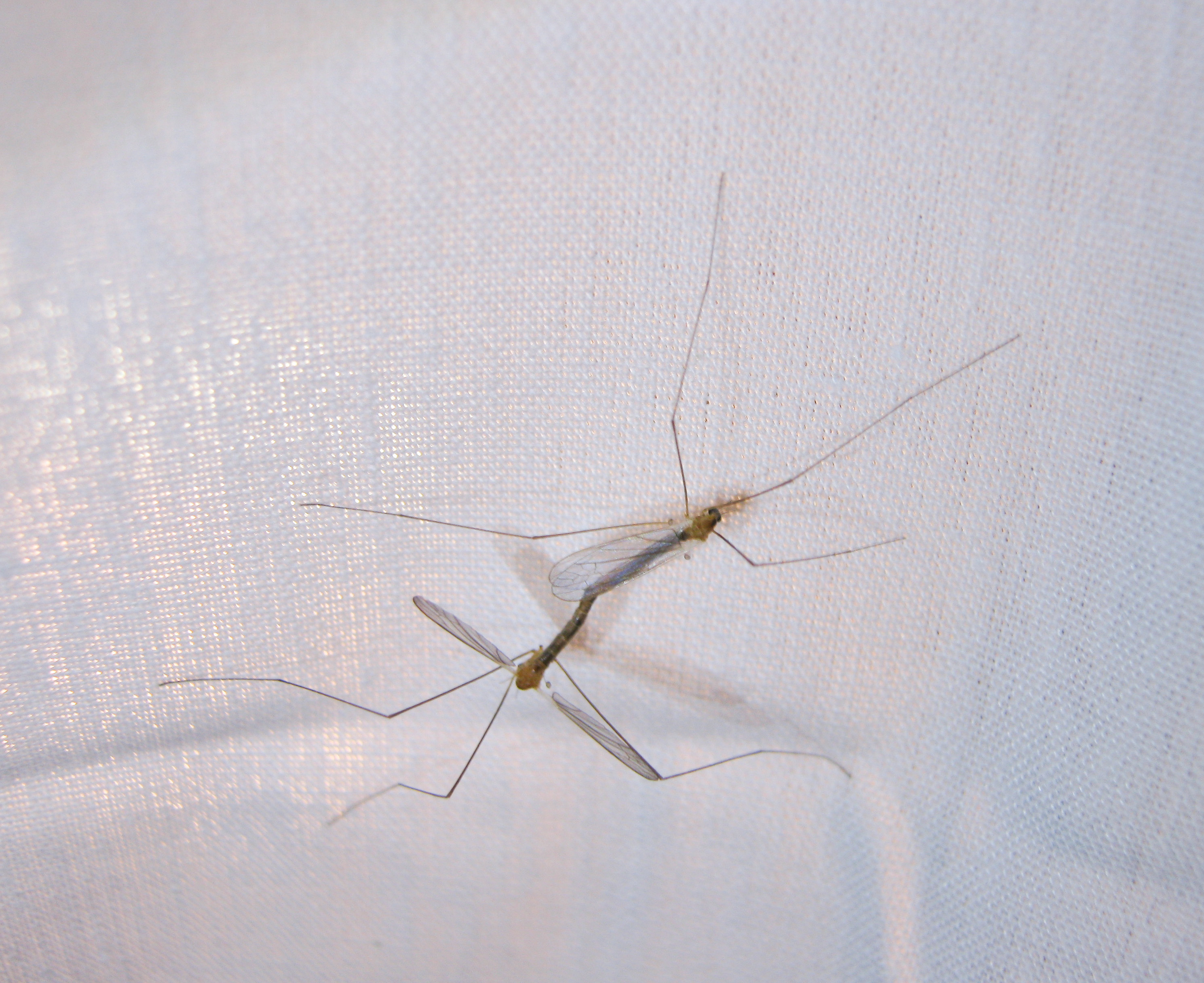
- Mating pair

Scientific classification
- Domain: Eukaryota
- Kingdom: Animalia
- Phylum: Arthropoda
- Class: Insecta
- Order: Diptera
- Family: Limoniidae
- Genus: Antocha
- Species: A. saxicola

Binomial name
- Antocha saxicola Osten Sacken

= Antocha saxicola =

Species of fly

Antocha saxicola is a species of limoniid crane fly in the family Limoniidae, tribe Limoniini. Larvae lack open spiracles and can only live in fast-flowing, well-oxygenated water.
