= Limonia novaeangliae =

Scientific classification
- Domain: Eukaryota
- Kingdom: Animalia
- Phylum: Arthropoda
- Class: Insecta
- Order: Diptera
- Family: Limoniidae
- Tribe: Limoniini
- Genus: Limonia
- Species: L. novaeangliae

Binomial name
- Limonia novaeangliae Alexander, 1929

Species of fly

Limonia novaeangliae is a species of limoniid crane fly in the family Limoniidae.
