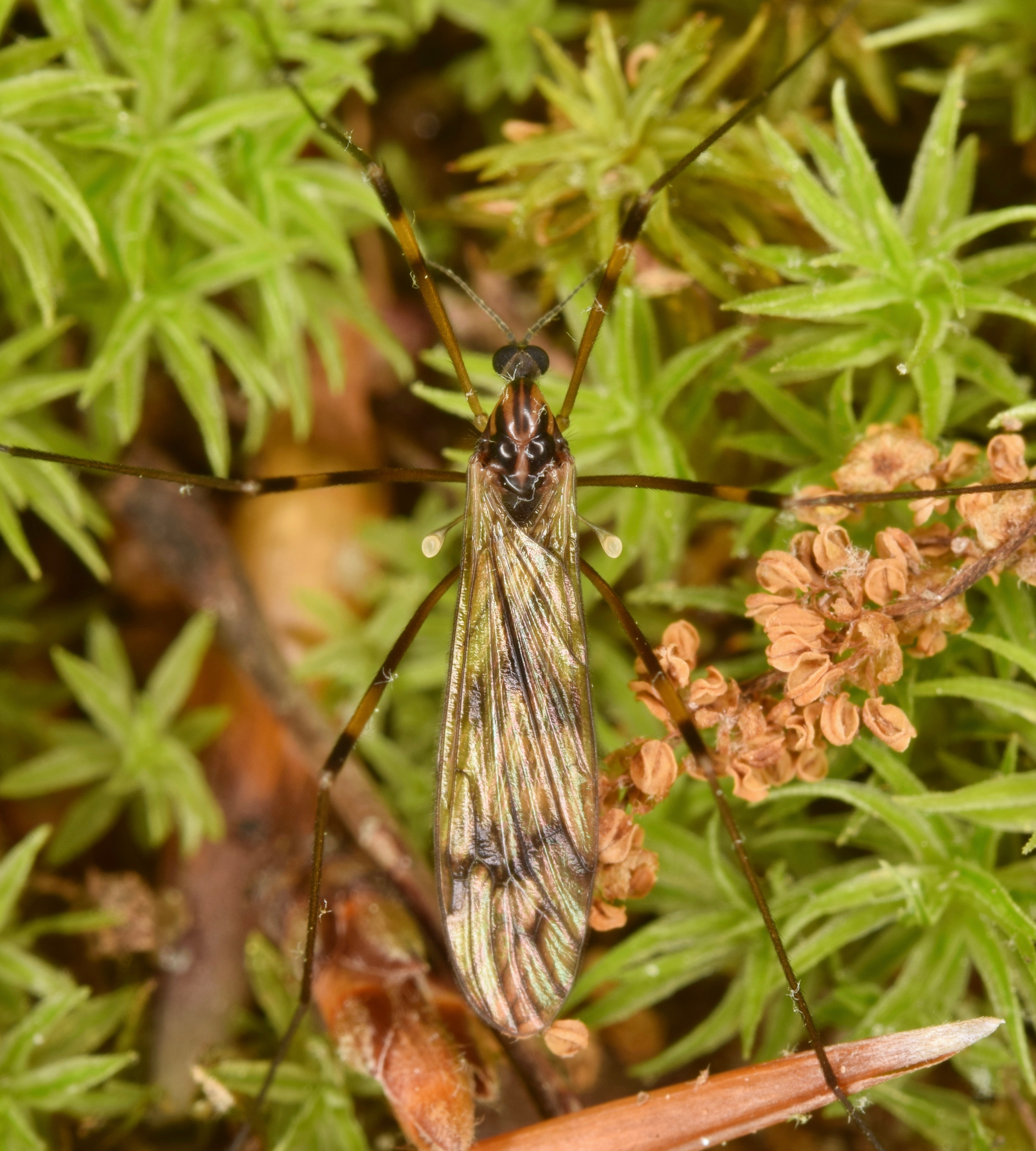

Scientific classification
- Kingdom: Animalia
- Phylum: Arthropoda
- Clade: Pancrustacea
- Class: Insecta
- Order: Diptera
- Family: Limoniidae
- Tribe: Limoniini
- Genus: Limonia
- Species: L. indigena

Binomial name
- Limonia indigena Osten Sacken

= Limonia indigena =

Species of fly

Limonia indigena is a species of limoniid crane fly in the family Limoniidae.

== Subspecies ==
These three subspecies belong to the species Limonia indigena:

- Limonia indigena indigena;
- Limonia indigena jacksoni (Alexander, 1917);
- Limonia indigena loloensis Alexander, 1958.
