= Limonia marmorata =

Scientific classification
- Domain: Eukaryota
- Kingdom: Animalia
- Phylum: Arthropoda
- Class: Insecta
- Order: Diptera
- Family: Limoniidae
- Tribe: Limoniini
- Genus: Limonia
- Species: L. marmorata

Binomial name
- Limonia marmorata Osten Sacken, 1861

Synonyms
- Dicranomyia marmorata Osten Sacken, 1861; Dicranomyia rhipidioides Alexander, 1918; Dicranomyia signipennis Coquillett, 1905

Species of fly

Limonia marmorata is a species of limoniid crane fly in the family Limoniidae.
