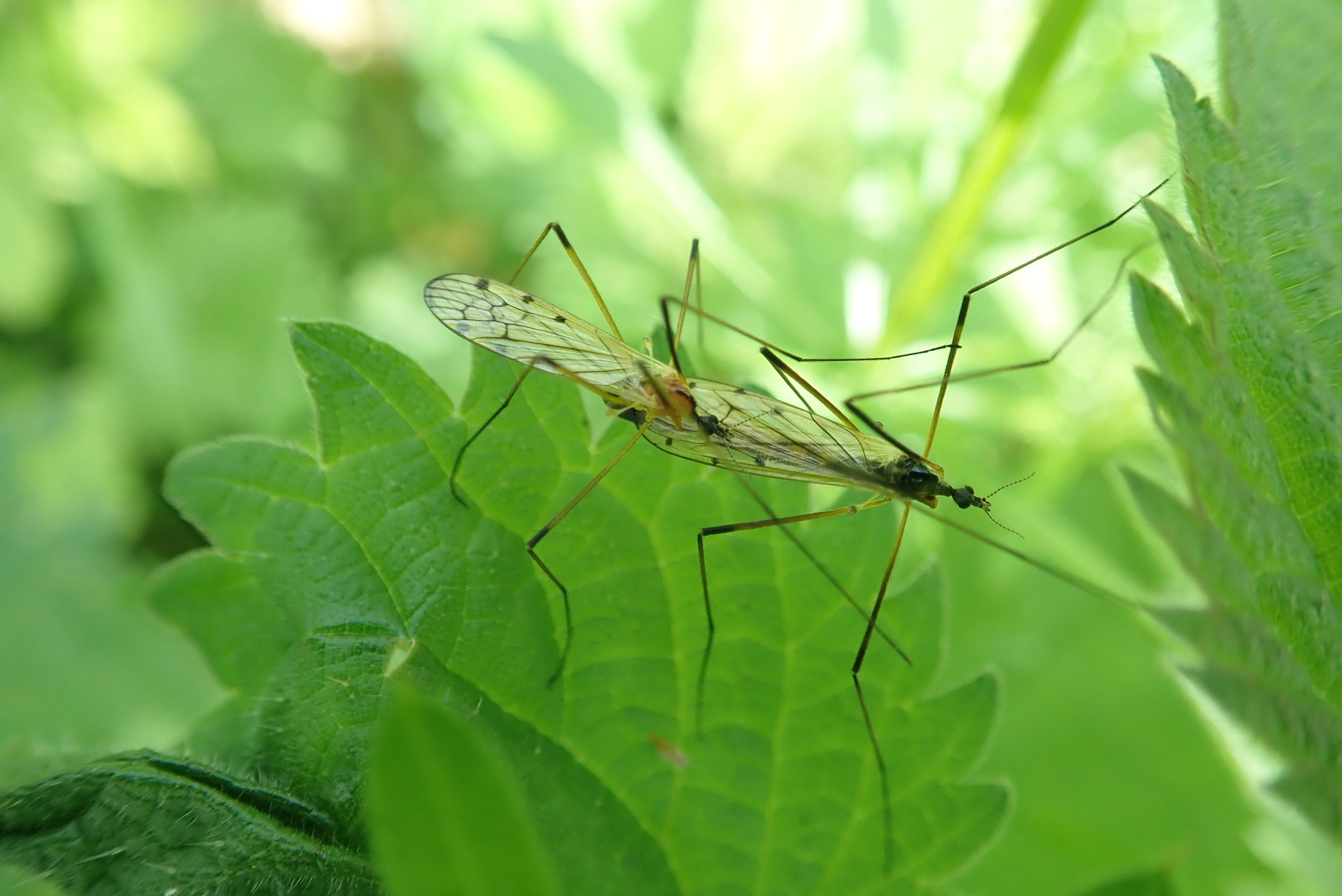

Scientific classification
- Domain: Eukaryota
- Kingdom: Animalia
- Phylum: Arthropoda
- Class: Insecta
- Order: Diptera
- Family: Limoniidae
- Genus: Limonia
- Species: L. nigropunctata

Binomial name
- Limonia nigropunctata (Schummel, 1829)

= Limonia nigropunctata =

Species of fly

Limonia nigropunctata is a species of fly from the genus Limoniam which was originally described by Theodor Emil Schummel in 1829
