= Limonia domestica =

Scientific classification
- Domain: Eukaryota
- Kingdom: Animalia
- Phylum: Arthropoda
- Class: Insecta
- Order: Diptera
- Family: Limoniidae
- Genus: Limonia
- Species: L. domestica

Binomial name
- Limonia domestica Osten Sacken, 1859

Species of fly

Limonia domestica is a species of limoniid crane fly in the family Limoniidae.
