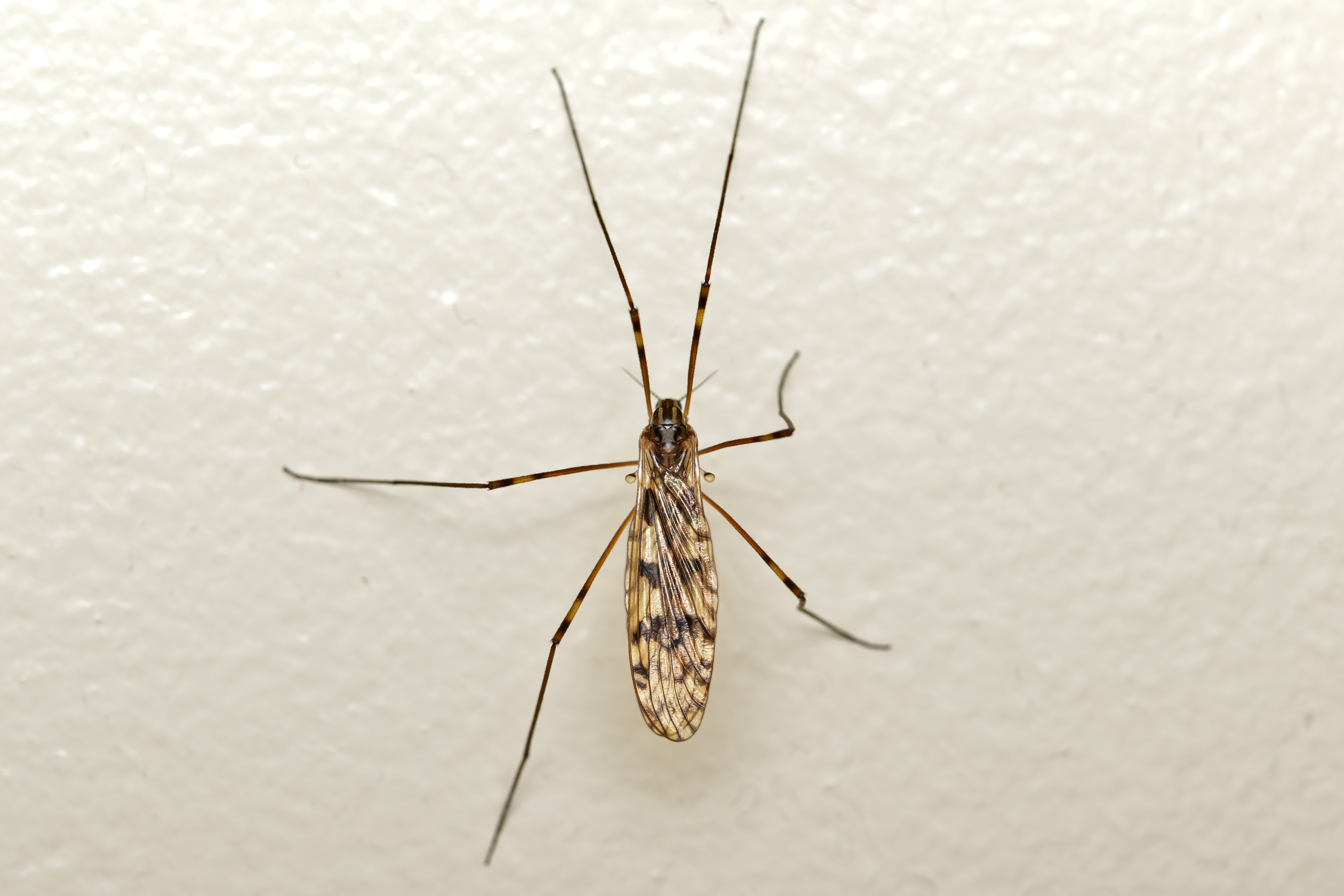
- Limonia cinctipes

Scientific classification
- Domain: Eukaryota
- Kingdom: Animalia
- Phylum: Arthropoda
- Class: Insecta
- Order: Diptera
- Family: Limoniidae
- Genus: Limonia
- Species: L. cinctipes

Binomial name
- Limonia cinctipes Say

= Limonia cinctipes =

Species of fly

Limonia cinctipes is a species of limoniid crane fly in the family Limoniidae.
