= Limonia flavipes =

Scientific classification
- Kingdom: Animalia
- Phylum: Arthropoda
- Clade: Pancrustacea
- Class: Insecta
- Order: Diptera
- Family: Limoniidae
- Genus: Limonia
- Species: L. flavipes

Binomial name
- Limonia flavipes (Fabricius, 1787)

Species of fly

Limonia flavipes is a species of fly in the family Limoniidae. It is found in the Palearctic.
