= Elliptera astigmatica =

Scientific classification
- Kingdom: Animalia
- Phylum: Arthropoda
- Class: Insecta
- Order: Diptera
- Family: Limoniidae
- Genus: Elliptera
- Species: E. astigmatica

Binomial name
- Elliptera astigmatica Alexander, 1912

Species of insect

Elliptera astigmatica is a species of limoniid crane fly in the family Limoniidae.
