= Limonia rostrata =

Scientific classification
- Domain: Eukaryota
- Kingdom: Animalia
- Phylum: Arthropoda
- Class: Insecta
- Order: Diptera
- Family: Limoniidae
- Genus: Limonia
- Species: L. rostrata

Binomial name
- Limonia rostrata (Say, 1823)

Synonyms
- Limnobia rostrata Say, 1823

Species of fly

Limonia rostrata is a species of limoniid crane fly in the family Limoniidae.
