= Elliptera =

Scientific classification
- Kingdom: Animalia
- Phylum: Arthropoda
- Class: Insecta
- Order: Diptera
- Family: Limoniidae
- Tribe: Limoniini
- Genus: Elliptera; Schiner, 1863

Type species
- Elliptera omissa Schiner, 1863

Species
- See text

Genus of flies

Elliptera is a genus of crane fly in the family Limoniidae.

== Species ==
- E. astigmatica Alexander, 1912
- E. clausa Osten Sacken, 1877
- E. coloradensis Alexander, 1920
- E. hungarica Madarassy, 1881
- E. illini Alexander, 1920
- E. jacoti Alexander, 1925
- E. omissa Schiner, 1863
- E. tennessa Alexander, 1926
- E. usingeri Alexander, 1966
- E. zipanguensis Alexander, 1924
