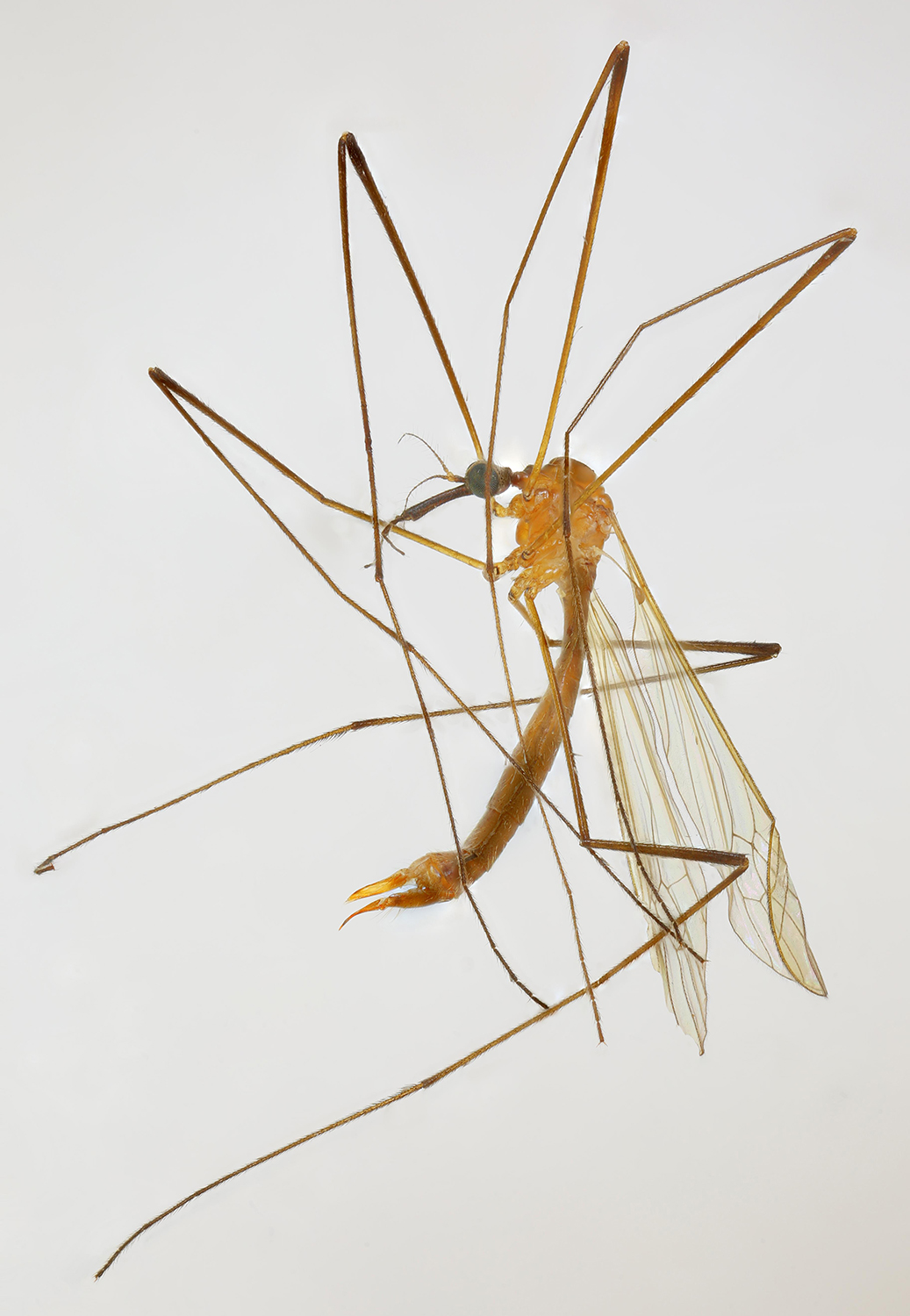
- Helius flavus

Scientific classification
- Kingdom: Animalia
- Phylum: Arthropoda
- Class: Insecta
- Order: Diptera
- Family: Limoniidae
- Subfamily: Limoniinae
- Tribe: Limoniini
- Genus: Helius; Le Peletier & Serville, 1828

Type species
- Limnobia longirostris Meigen, 1818

Subgenera
- Eurhamphidia Alexander, 1915; Helius Lepeletier & Serville, 1828; Idiohelius Alexander, 1948; Mammuthonasus Theischinger, 1994; Prohelius Alexander, 1975; Rhamphidina Alexander, 1920; Rhamphidioides Alexander, 1920; Rhampholimnobia Alexander, 1915; Rhyncholimonia Alexander, 1964

Synonyms
- Megarhina Le Peletier & Serville, 1828; Leptorhina Stephens, 1829; Rhamphidia Meigen, 1830

= Helius (fly) =

Genus of flies

Helius is a genus of crane fly in the family Limoniidae, distributed worldwide with most species in Australia and East Asia.

== Species ==
- Subgenus Eurhamphidia Alexander, 1915

- H. abnormalis (Brunetti, 1918)
- H. ata Alexander, 1931
- H. atroapicalis Alexander, 1978
- H. auranticolor Alexander, 1936
- H. connectus Edwards, 1928
- H. diacanthus Alexander, 1931
- H. fuscofemoratus Alexander, 1931
- H. glabristylatus Alexander, 1931
- H. indivisus Alexander, 1931
- H. inelegans (Alexander, 1928)
- H. invenustipes (Alexander, 1930)
- H. melanosoma Alexander, 1936
- H. mimicans Edwards, 1933
- H. mirus Edwards, 1926
- H. monticola (Edwards, 1919)
- H. mouensis Alexander, 1948
- H. nigrofemoratus (Alexander, 1930)
- H. niveitarsis (Skuse, 1890)
- H. pallens Edwards, 1933
- H. perelegans Alexander, 1930
- H. perlongatus Alexander, 1978
- H. scabiosus Alexander, 1932
- H. vitiensis Alexander, 1956

- Subgenus Helius Lepeletier & Serville, 1828

- H. acanthostyla Alexander, 1944
- H. aciferus Alexander, 1937
- H. aka Alexander, 1972
- H. albitarsis (Osten Sacken, 1888)
- H. albogeniculatus Alexander, 1936
- H. amplus Edwards, 1933
- H. anaemicus Alexander, 1932
- H. anamalaiensis Alexander, 1967
- H. angustalbus Alexander, 1953
- H. aphrophilus Alexander, 1948
- H. apicalis (Alexander, 1915)
- H. apoensis Alexander, 1931
- H. apophysalis Alexander, 1967
- H. araucariae Alexander, 1945
- H. arcuarius Alexander, 1929
- H. argyrosternus Alexander, 1930
- H. arunachalus Alexander, 1975
- H. attenuatus Alexander, 1929
- H. barbatus Edwards, 1921
- H. bicolor Edwards, 1933
- H. bifurcus Alexander, 1956
- H. bitergatus Alexander, 1950
- H. boops Alexander, 1942
- H. brachyphallus Alexander, 1956
- H. brevioricornis (Alexander, 1920)
- H. brevisector Alexander, 1956
- H. brunneus Byers, 1981
- H. cacoxenus (Alexander, 1920)
- H. calviensis Edwards, 1928
- H. capensis (Alexander, 1917)
- H. capniopterus Alexander, 1945
- H. catreus Alexander, 1967
- H. cavernicolus Alexander, 1961
- H. chikurinensis Alexander, 1930
- H. chintoo Theischinger, 1994
- H. communis (Skuse, 1890)
- H. comoreanus Alexander, 1959
- H. compactus Alexander, 1967
- H. copiosus Alexander, 1935
- H. corniger Savchenko, 1983
- H. costofimbriatus Alexander, 1930
- H. costosetosus Alexander, 1932
- H. creper Alexander, 1926
- H. ctenonycha Alexander, 1938
- H. dafla Alexander, 1972
- H. darlingtonae Welch & Gelhaus, 1994
- H. destitutus Alexander, 1971
- H. devinctus Alexander, 1932
- H. distinervis Alexander, 1940
- H. dolichorhynchus Edwards, 1933
- H. eremnophallus Alexander, 1978
- H. euryphallus Alexander, 1960
- H. fasciventris Edwards, 1926
- H. ferruginosus (Brunetti, 1912)
- H. flavidibasis Alexander, 1975
- H. flavipes (Macquart, 1855)
- H. flavitarsis (Alexander, 1920)
- H. flavus (Walker, 1856)
- H. fragosus Alexander, 1937
- H. franckianus Alexander, 1940
- H. fratellus (Brunetti, 1918)
- H. fulvithorax (Skuse, 1890)
- H. fumicosta Edwards, 1928
- H. fuscoangustus Alexander, 1967
- H. garcianus Alexander, 1972
- H. gibbifer Savchenko, 1981
- H. gorokanus Alexander, 1962
- H. gracillimus Alexander, 1938
- H. graphipterus Alexander, 1954
- H. haemorrhoidalis Alexander, 1937
- H. harrisi (Alexander, 1923)
- H. hatschbachi Alexander, 1954
- H. hispanicus Lackschewitz, 1928
- H. hova Alexander, 1955
- H. impensus Alexander, 1967
- H. imperfectus (Alexander, 1920)
- H. inconspicuus (Brunetti, 1912)
- H. ineptus Alexander, 1938
- H. infirmus Alexander, 1932
- H. invariegatus Alexander, 1938
- H. iris (Alexander, 1920)
- H. kambangani (de Meijere, 1913)
- H. kambanganoides Alexander, 1931
- H. larotypa Alexander, 1926
- H. lectus Alexander, 1936
- H. leucoplaca Alexander, 1936
- H. lienpingensis Alexander, 1945
- H. liguliferus Alexander, 1978
- H. liliputanus Alexander, 1929
- H. lobuliferus Alexander, 1938
- H. longinervis Edwards, 1928
- H. longirostris (Meigen, 1818)
- H. luachimoensis Alexander, 1963
- H. luniger (Riedel, 1914)
- H. mainensis (Alexander, 1916)
- H. malagasicus Alexander, 1955
- H. manueli Alexander, 1972
- H. medleri Alexander, 1976
- H. melanophallus Alexander, 1938
- H. mesorhynchus Alexander, 1933
- H. micracanthus Alexander, 1945
- H. mirabilis (Alexander, 1914)
- H. mirandus (Alexander, 1921)
- H. morosus (Alexander, 1920)
- H. multivolus Alexander, 1945
- H. murreensis Alexander, 1960
- H. myersiellus Alexander, 1935
- H. nawaianus Alexander, 1929
- H. neocaledonicus Alexander, 1945
- H. nigricapella Alexander, 1938
- H. nigriceps (Edwards, 1916)
- H. nipponensis (Alexander, 1913)
- H. numenius Alexander, 1967
- H. obliteratus (Alexander, 1920)
- H. obsoletus (Alexander, 1920)
- H. oxystylus Alexander, 1967
- H. pallidipes Alexander, 1926
- H. pallidissimus Alexander, 1930
- H. pallirostris Edwards, 1921
- H. panamensis Alexander, 1934
- H. paramorosus Alexander, 1949
- H. parvidens Alexander, 1944
- H. patens Edwards, 1933
- H. pauperculus (Alexander, 1921)
- H. pavoninus Alexander, 1938
- H. perflavens Alexander, 1964
- H. perpallidus Alexander, 1942
- H. pervenustus Alexander, 1953
- H. phasmatis Alexander, 1945
- H. pictus Edwards, 1926
- H. plebeius Alexander, 1946
- H. pluto Alexander, 1932
- H. polionotus Alexander, 1938
- H. procerus Alexander, 1931
- H. productellus Alexander, 1944
- H. protumidus Alexander, 1978
- H. quadrifidus Alexander, 1926
- H. quadrivena Alexander, 1971
- H. rectispinus Alexander, 1947
- H. rectus Alexander, 1945
- H. regius Alexander, 1944
- H. rostratus Alexander, 1956
- H. rubicundus (Alexander, 1922)
- H. rufescens (Edwards, 1916)
- H. rufithorax Alexander, 1928
- H. sanguinolentus (Alexander, 1921)
- H. schildi Alexander, 1945
- H. selectus Alexander, 1936
- H. serenus Alexander, 1967
- H. setigerus Alexander, 1980
- H. sigillatus Alexander, 1964
- H. stenorhynchus Alexander, 1954
- H. stolidus Alexander, 1948
- H. subanaemicus Alexander, 1964
- H. subarcuarius Alexander, 1934
- H. subfasciatus Alexander, 1924
- H. submorosus (Alexander, 1921)
- H. subobsoletus (Alexander, 1921)
- H. subpauperculus Alexander, 1975
- H. tantalus Alexander, 1967
- H. tanyrhinus Alexander, 1964
- H. taos Alexander, 1967
- H. tenuirostris Alexander, 1924
- H. tenuistylus Alexander, 1929
- H. tetracradus Alexander, 1967
- H. tienmuanus Alexander, 1940
- H. tonaleah Theischinger, 1994
- H. trianguliferus Alexander, 1931
- H. tshinta Theischinger, 1994
- H. unicolor (Brunetti, 1912)
- H. uniformis (Alexander, 1914)
- H. venustus (Skuse, 1890)
- H. verticillatus Alexander, 1967
- H. yindi Theischinger, 1994

- Subgenus Idiohelius Alexander, 1948

- H. melanolithus Alexander, 1953
- H. mirificus Alexander, 1953
- H. pentaneura Alexander, 1948

- Subgenus Mammuthonasus Theischinger, 1994

- H. allunga Theischinger, 1994

- Subgenus Prohelius Alexander, 1975

- H. dugaldi Alexander, 1945
- H. edwardsianus Alexander, 1956
- H. fulani Alexander, 1975

- Subgenus Rhamphidina Alexander, 1920

- H. camerounensis (Alexander, 1920)

- Subgenus Rhamphidioides Alexander, 1920

- H. alluaudi (Riedel, 1914)
- H. venustissimus (Alexander, 1920)

- Subgenus Rhampholimnobia Alexander, 1915

- H. bigeminatus Alexander, 1962
- H. brevinasus Alexander, 1934
- H. deentoo Theischinger, 1994
- H. diffusus Alexander, 1941
- H. fenestratus Alexander, 1973
- H. gracilirostris Alexander, 1962
- H. guttulinus Alexander, 1960
- H. japenensis Alexander, 1948
- H. matilei Hynes, 1993
- H. mesolineatus Alexander, 1962
- H. nimbus Alexander, 1941
- H. papuanus Alexander, 1934
- H. reticularis (Alexander, 1915)
- H. simulator Alexander, 1962
- H. spinteris Alexander, 1960
- H. subreticulatus Alexander, 1962

- Subgenus Rhyncholimonia Alexander, 1964

- H. dicroneurus Alexander, 1964
