= Elliptera tennessa =

Scientific classification
- Kingdom: Animalia
- Phylum: Arthropoda
- Class: Insecta
- Order: Diptera
- Family: Limoniidae
- Genus: Elliptera
- Species: E. tennessa

Binomial name
- Elliptera tennessa Alexander, 1926

Species of fly

Elliptera tennessa is a species of limoniid crane fly in the family Limoniidae.
