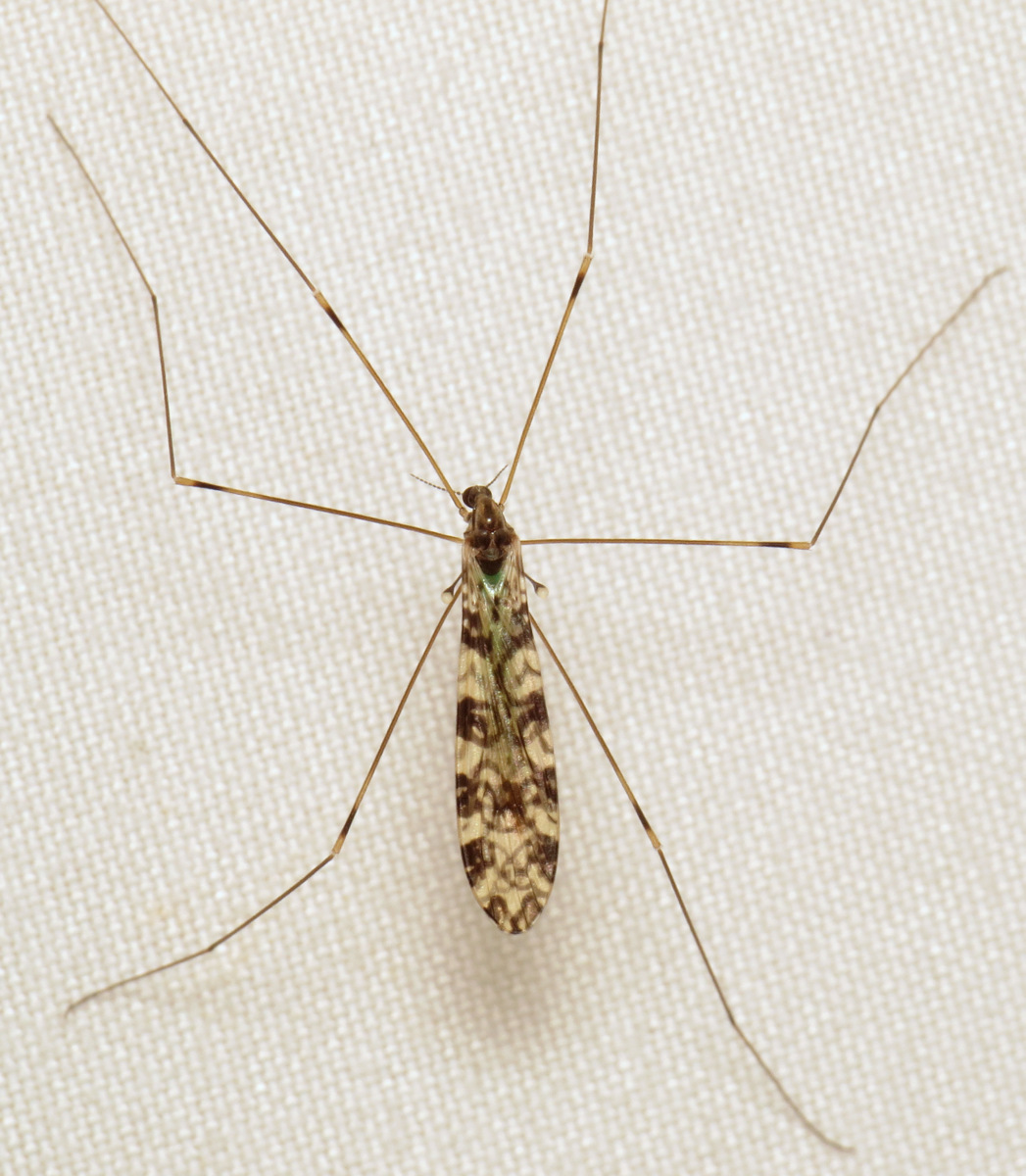

Scientific classification
- Kingdom: Animalia
- Phylum: Arthropoda
- Class: Insecta
- Order: Diptera
- Family: Limoniidae
- Genus: Limonia
- Species: L. annulata

Binomial name
- Limonia annulata Linnaeus, 1758

= Limonia annulata =

Species of fly

Limonia annulata is a species of limoniid crane fly in the family Limoniidae.
