= Limonia hardyana =

Scientific classification
- Kingdom: Animalia
- Phylum: Arthropoda
- Clade: Pancrustacea
- Class: Insecta
- Order: Diptera
- Family: Limoniidae
- Genus: Limonia
- Species: L. hardyana

Binomial name
- Limonia hardyana Byers, 1985

Species of fly

Limonia hardyana, also known as the flightless cranefly, is a species of fly in the family Limoniidae. It inhabits leaf litter on Oʻahu.

== Description ==
Limonia hardyana has six elongated legs, a tri-segmented body, and no wings. Sometimes mistaken for a mosquito.

== Habitat ==
Limonia hardyana was discovered on or near the summit of Koolau Mountains on O'ahu in Hawaii. This mountain range is 3,130 ft (960 meters) in elevation and is a dormant volcano,; L. hardyana lives in bogs and leaf litter at high elevations. L. hardyana is believed have evolved flightlessness due to the strong mountain winds.

L. hardyana larvae are benthic and take approximately two weeks to hatch.

== Discovery ==
Limonia hardyana was discovered by George William Byers, an entomology professor at the University of Kansas, in 1985. Byers was the curator of the Snow Entomology Division of the Biodiversity Institute of the University. He continued to study craneflies until his passing in 2018.

=== Conservation ===
Possible threats to Limonia hardyana include diverting waterways away from the species' habitat, thus eliminating its breeding grounds. Habitat destruction caused by wild boars and predation from other insects are also threats.
