= Limonia duplicata =

Scientific classification
- Domain: Eukaryota
- Kingdom: Animalia
- Phylum: Arthropoda
- Class: Insecta
- Order: Diptera
- Family: Limoniidae
- Genus: Limonia
- Species: L. duplicata

Binomial name
- Limonia duplicata (Doane, 1900)

Synonyms
- Dicranomyia duplicata Doane, 1900; Dicranomyia negligens Alexander, 1927; Dicranomyia venusta Bergroth, 1888; Rhipidia maculata Meigen, 1818

Species of fly

Limonia duplicata is a species of limoniid crane fly in the family Limoniidae.
