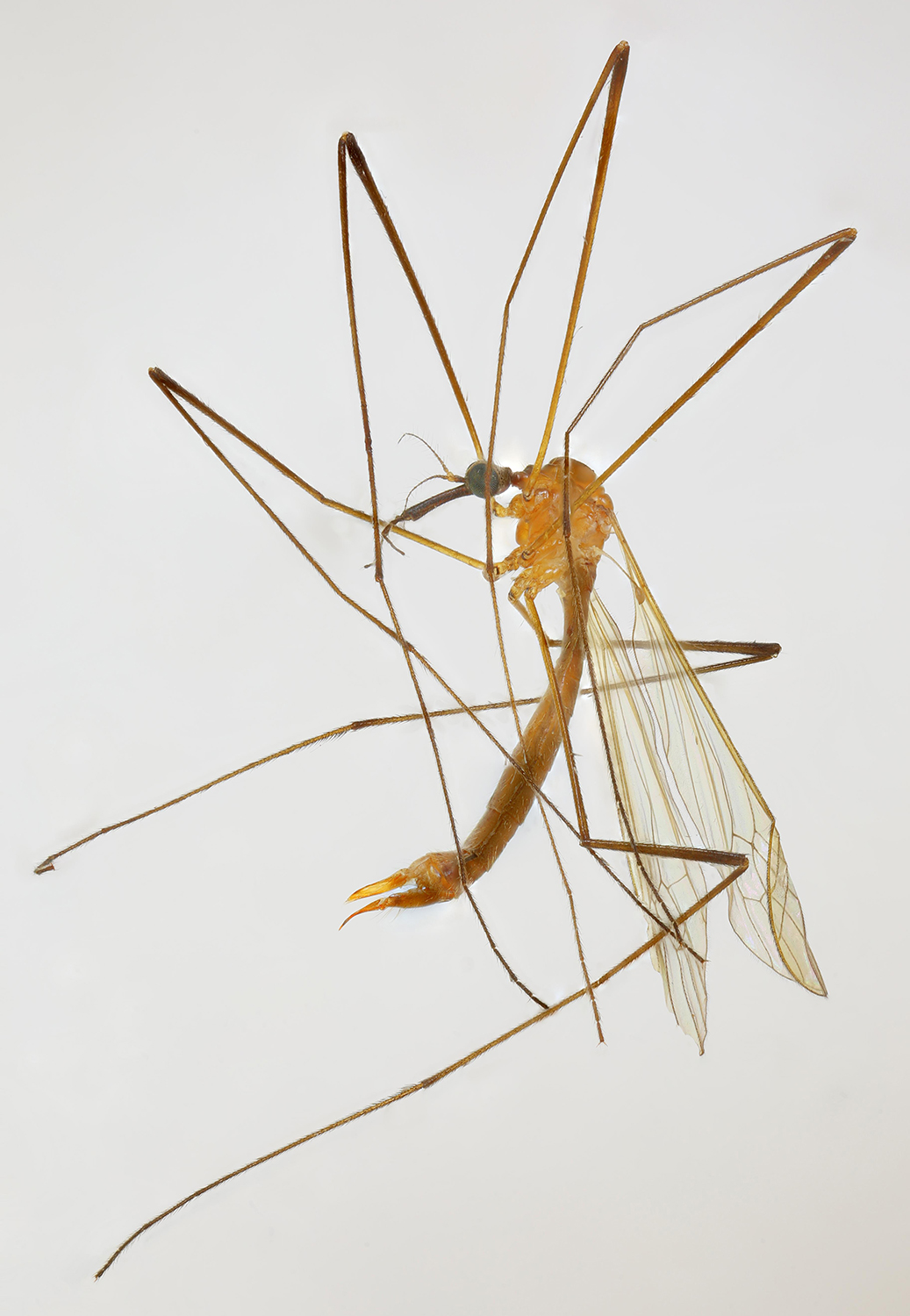
- Helius flavus North Wales

Scientific classification
- Kingdom: Animalia
- Phylum: Arthropoda
- Class: Insecta
- Order: Diptera
- Family: Limoniidae
- Genus: Helius
- Species: H. flavus

Binomial name
- Helius flavus (Walker, 1856)

= Helius flavus =

Species of fly

Helius flavus is a species of fly in the family Limoniidae. It is found in the Palearctic.
