= Elliptera omissa =

Scientific classification
- Domain: Eukaryota
- Kingdom: Animalia
- Phylum: Arthropoda
- Class: Insecta
- Order: Diptera
- Family: Limoniidae
- Genus: Elliptera
- Species: E. omissa

Binomial name
- Elliptera omissa Schiner, 1863

Species of fly

Elliptera omissa is a species of limoniid crane fly in the family Limoniidae.
