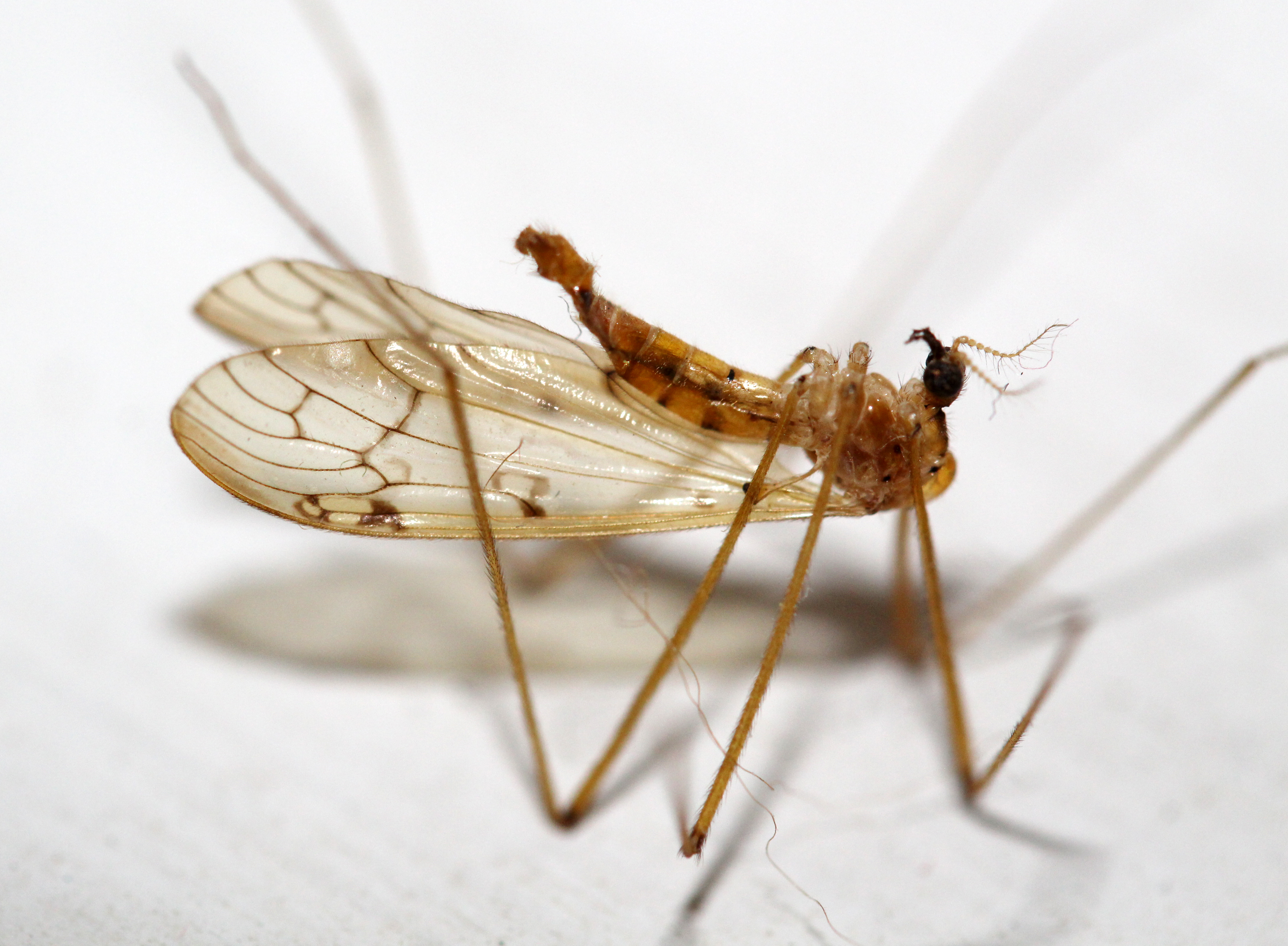

Scientific classification
- Kingdom: Animalia
- Phylum: Arthropoda
- Class: Insecta
- Order: Diptera
- Family: Limoniidae
- Genus: Limonia
- Species: L. triocellata

Binomial name
- Limonia triocellata (Osten Sacken, 1859)

Synonyms
- Limnobia triocellata (Osten Sacken, 1859)

= Limonia triocellata =

Species of fly

Limonia triocellata is a species of limoniid crane fly in the family Limoniidae. Three eye-like spots can be found on each of its wings, from which it derives its scientific name. It can be found primarily in the eastern United States and Canada especially during either of its two flight periods from May-June and September-October.

== Description ==
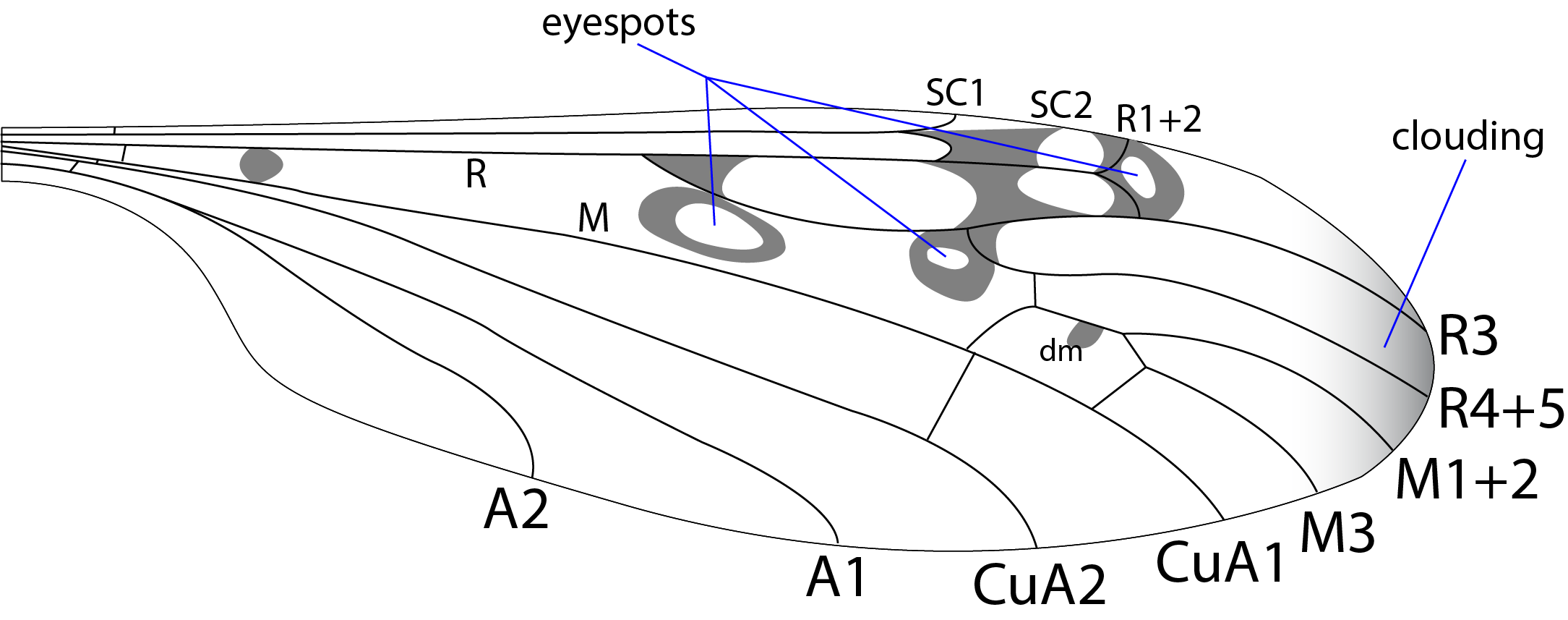
A diagram of the wing venation and markings of Limonia triocellata

Adult flies are medium to small for crane flies, with a body approximately 8-12mm in length. The mesonotum is a glossy yellow and has four brown markings on either end. Four more elongated markings can be found on the scutum facing slightly inwards back towards the mesonotum. Between the mesonotal prescutum and the scutum there is a V-shaped suture distinctive to all Limoniinae. Though many Limonia species have an elongated terminal palpus, those present on L. triocellata are blunt. The antennae consist of 14 segments, characteristic of Limonia genus. Brown patches exist on the wings in addition to the ocelli, especially towards the ends of veins. The tip of the abdomen determines sex, with the male abdomen terminating in a club-shaped hypogium while the female's ends in a pointed ovipositor.
