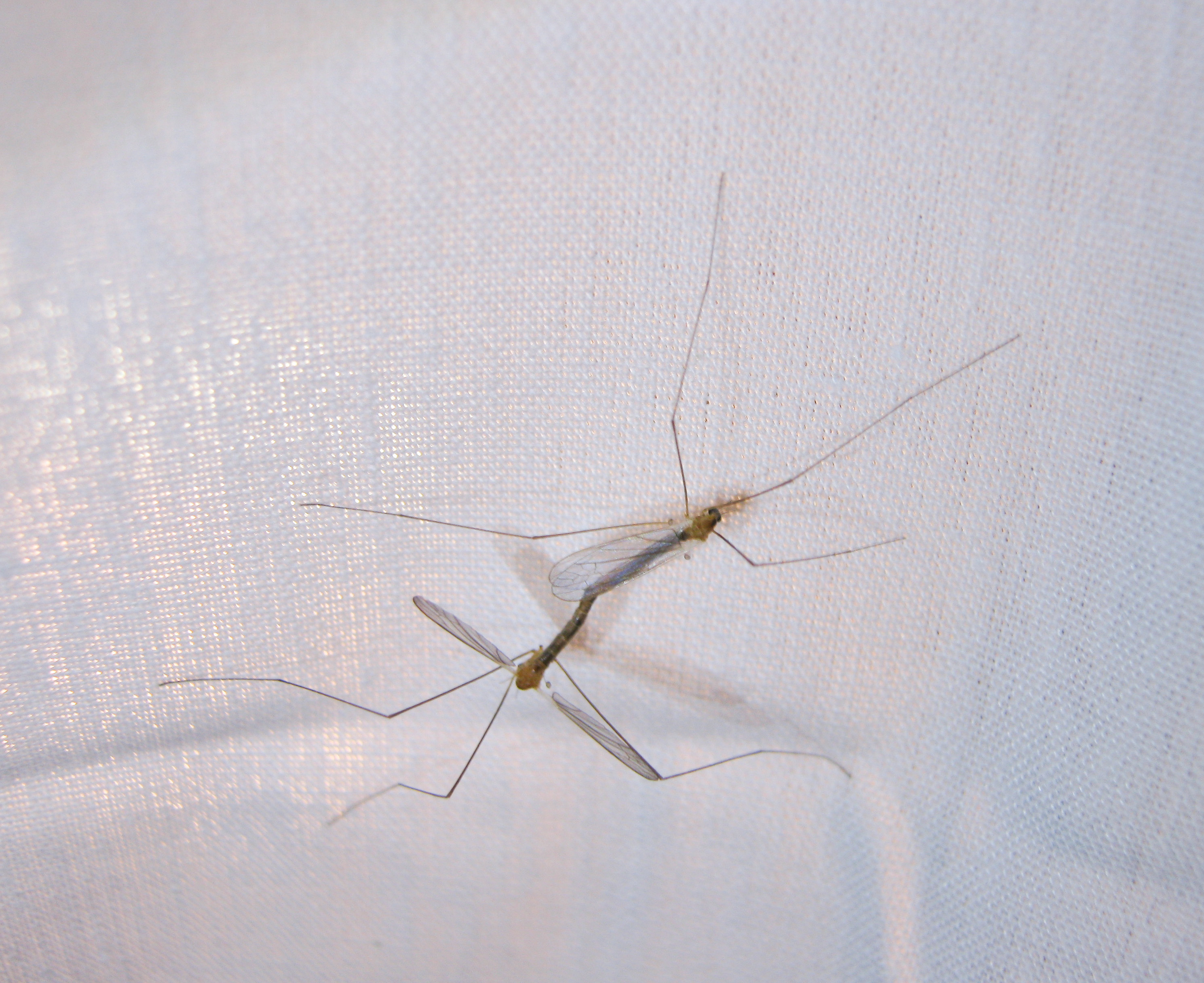
- Antocha saxicola, mating pair

Scientific classification
- Kingdom: Animalia
- Phylum: Arthropoda
- Class: Insecta
- Order: Diptera
- Family: Limoniidae
- Tribe: Limoniini
- Genus: Antocha; Osten Sacken, 1860

Type species
- A. saxicola Osten Sacken, 1860

Subgenera
- Antocha Osten Sacken, 1860; Orimargula Mik, 1883; Proantocha Alexander, 1919

Synonyms
- Taphrophila Rondani, 1856

= Antocha =

Genus of flies

Antocha is a genus of crane flies in the family Limoniidae. It was first described by Baron Carl Robert Osten-Sacken in 1860.

== Species ==
- Subgenus Antocha Osten Sacken, 1860
  - A. aciculifera Alexander, 1974
  - A. aegina Alexander, 1970
  - A. alexanderi Oosterbroek, 2009
  - A. amblystyla Alexander, 1963
  - A. angusticellula Alexander, 1969
  - A. angustiterga Alexander, 1949
  - A. arjuna Alexander, 1969
  - A. attenuata Alexander, 1969
  - A. basivena Alexander, 1936
  - A. bella Markeviciute and Podenas, 2019
  - A. biacus Savchenko, 1981
  - A. biarmata Alexander, 1940
  - A. bidens Alexander, 1932
  - A. bidigitata Alexander, 1954
  - A. bifida Alexander, 1924
  - A. biobtusa Alexander, 1968
  - A. brevifurca Alexander, 1974
  - A. brevinervis Alexander, 1924
  - A. brevistyla Alexander, 1924
  - A. capitella Alexander, 1941
  - A. chonsaniana Podenas, 2015
  - A. confluenta Alexander, 1926
  - A. constricta Alexander, 1932
  - A. dafla Alexander, 1969
  - A. decurvata Alexander, 1941
  - A. decussata Alexander, 1973
  - A. dentifera Alexander, 1924
  - A. dilatata Alexander, 1924
  - A. emarginata Alexander, 1938
  - A. exilistyla Alexander, 1969
  - A. flavidibasis Alexander, 1938
  - A. flavidula Alexander, 1936
  - A. fortidens Alexander, 1933
  - A. fusca Edwards, 1928
  - A. gladiata Alexander, 1974
  - A. globulosa Alexander, 1973
  - A. glycera Alexander, 1969
  - A. gracillima Alexander, 1924
  - A. hirtipes Savchenko, 1971
  - A. hyperlata Alexander, 1968
  - A. incurva Alexander, 1968
  - A. indica Brunetti, 1912
  - A. javanensis Alexander, 1915
  - A. khasiensis Alexander, 1936
  - A. koreana Podenas and Byun, 2014
  - A. lacteibasis Alexander, 1935
  - A. latifurca Alexander, 1969
  - A. libanotica Lackschewitz, 1940
  - A. lindneri (Nielsen, 1963)
  - A. longispina Alexander, 1969
  - A. macrocera Alexander, 1970
  - A. madrasensis Alexander, 1970
  - A. mara Alexander, 1970
  - A. microcera Alexander, 1974
  - A. minuticornis Alexander, 1931
  - A. mitosanensis Torii, 1992
  - A. monticola Alexander, 1917
  - A. multidentata Alexander, 1932
  - A. mysorensis Alexander, 1974
  - A. nebulipennis Alexander, 1931
  - A. nebulosa Edwards, 1928
  - A. neoflavella Alexander & Alexander, 1973
  - A. nigribasis Alexander, 1932
  - A. obtusa Alexander, 1925
  - A. opalizans Osten Sacken, 1860
  - A. ophioglossa Alexander, 1954
  - A. ophioglossodes Alexander, 1968
  - A. pachyphallus Alexander, 1971
  - A. pallidella Alexander, 1933
  - A. parvicristata Alexander, 1971
  - A. peracuta Alexander, 1971
  - A. perattenuata Alexander, 1971
  - A. perobtusa Alexander, 1971
  - A. perstudiosa Alexander, 1958
  - A. phoenicia Thomas and Dia, 1982
  - A. pictipennis Alexander, 1949
  - A. picturata Alexander, 1936
  - A. platyphallus Alexander, 1935
  - A. platystylis Alexander, 1974
  - A. plumbea Alexander, 1936
  - A. postnotalis Alexander, 1974
  - A. prolixistyla Alexander, 1971
  - A. pterographa Alexander, 1953
  - A. pulchra Markeviciute and Podenas, 2021
  - A. quadrifurca Alexander, 1971
  - A. quadrirhaphis Alexander, 1971
  - A. ramulifera Savchenko, 1983
  - A. rectispina Alexander, 1954
  - A. retracta Edwards, 1933
  - A. satsuma Alexander, 1919
  - A. saxicola Osten Sacken, 1860
  - A. scapularis Alexander, 1968
  - A. scelesta Alexander, 1936
  - A. scutella Alexander, 1973
  - A. scutifera Alexander, 1973
  - A. setigera Alexander, 1933
  - A. shansiensis Alexander, 1954
  - A. sparsipunctata Alexander, 1936
  - A. spiralis Alexander, 1932
  - A. stenophallus Alexander, 1974
  - A. streptocera Alexander, 1949
  - A. studiosa Alexander, 1951
  - A. styx Alexander, 1930
  - A. subconfluenta Alexander, 1930
  - A. taiwanensis Podenas and Young, 2015
  - A. thienemanni Alexander, 1931
  - A. triangularis (Brunetti, 1912)
  - A. tuberculata Torii, 1992
  - A. turkestanica de Meijere, 1921
  - A. unicollis Alexander, 1968
  - A. unilineata Brunetti, 1912
  - A. vitripennis (Meigen, 1830)
  - A. yatungensis Alexander, 1963
  - A. yeongwola Podenas, 2016
- Subgenus Orimargula Mik, 1883
  - A. almorae Alexander, 1970
  - A. alpigena (Mik, 1883)
  - A. australiensis (Alexander, 1922)
  - A. brevicornis Alexander, 1960
  - A. brevifurca Alexander, 1970
  - A. brevisector Alexander, 1970
  - A. brevivena (Edwards, 1928)
  - A. delibata Riedel, 1914
  - A. flavella (Alexander, 1926)
  - A. gracilicornis (Edwards, 1925)
  - A. gracilipes (Alexander, 1927)
  - A. griseipennis (Alexander, 1920)
  - A. hintoni Alexander, 1967
  - A. indumeni Alexander, 1956
  - A. intermedia (Edwards, 1928)
  - A. kraussi Alexander, 1955
  - A. longicornis (Alexander, 1921)
  - A. maculipleura Edwards, 1933
  - A. melina Alexander, 1957
  - A. mesocera Alexander, 1931
  - A. minuscula Alexander, 1963
  - A. multispina Alexander, 1956
  - A. nigristyla Alexander, 1956
  - A. papuensis Alexander, 1953
  - A. pauliani Alexander, 1953
  - A. pedekiboana Lindner, 1958
  - A. philippina (Alexander, 1917)
  - A. possessiva Young, 1994
  - A. praescutalis Alexander, 1936
  - A. prefurcata Alexander, 1950
  - A. quadrispinosa Alexander, 1963
  - A. salikensis Alexander, 1958
  - A. schmidi Alexander, 1958
  - A. setosa Alexander, 1960
  - A. simplex Alexander, 1970
  - A. sparsissima Alexander, 1974
  - A. tana Alexander, 1972
  - A. tanycera Alexander, 1963
  - A. tasmanica (Alexander, 1928)
  - A. transvaalia (Alexander, 1921)
  - A. venosa Alexander, 1964
- Subgenus Proantocha Alexander, 1919
  - A. integra Alexander, 1940
  - A. latistilus Torii, 1992
  - A. sagana Alexander, 1932
  - A. spinifer Alexander, 1919
  - A. uyei (Alexander, 1928)

== Ecology ==
Larvae of the aquatic genus Antocha are primarily detritivorous, feeding on organic particles within silken tubes constructed on submerged rocks in flowing water. Unlike related genera such as Geranomyia, Antocha larvae lack posterior spiracles and instead respire cutaneously, absorbing oxygen directly through their rheophilic habitat. The larvae of Antocha saxicola are abundant in fast-flowing streams and rivers of eastern North America, typically inhabiting partially submerged rocks. Adult females often aggregate along the waterline to lay eggs on algae-covered surfaces. Species within this genus are particularly sensitive to changes in river flow, and climate change–driven alterations, such as increased frequency or intensity of floods, can reduce larval density and overall population productivity. For example, unusually strong floods in the Shinano River basin in Japan caused a substantial decline in crane fly secondary production, stressing the vulnerability of these insects to hydrological extremes.
