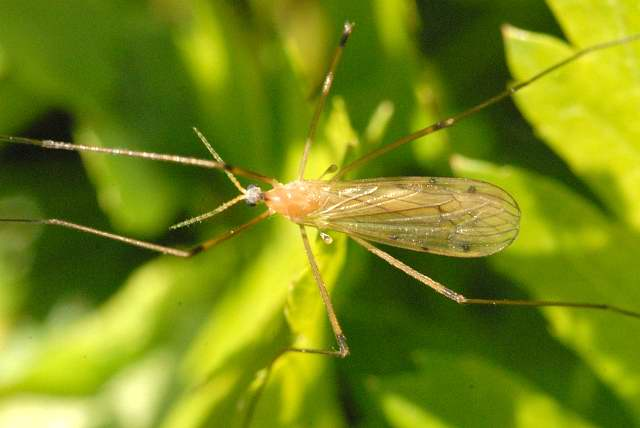
- Limonia phragmitidis Belgium

Scientific classification
- Domain: Eukaryota
- Kingdom: Animalia
- Phylum: Arthropoda
- Class: Insecta
- Order: Diptera
- Family: Limoniidae
- Genus: Limonia
- Species: L. phragmitidis

Binomial name
- Limonia phragmitidis Schrank, 1781

= Limonia phragmitidis =

Species of fly

Limonia phragmitidis is a Palearctic species of craneflies in the family Limoniidae.It is found in a wide range of habitats and micro habitats: in earth rich in humus, in swamps and marshes, in leaf litter and in wet spots in woods.
