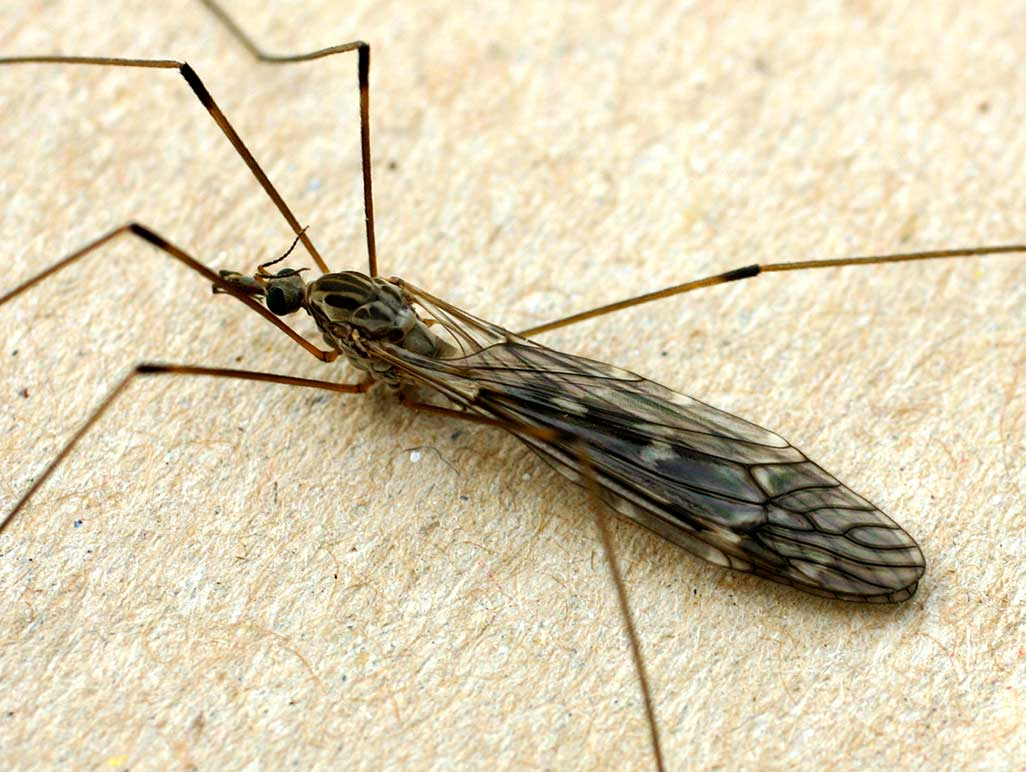

Scientific classification
- Kingdom: Animalia
- Phylum: Arthropoda
- Class: Insecta
- Order: Diptera
- Family: Limoniidae
- Genus: Limonia
- Species: L. nubeculosa

Binomial name
- Limonia nubeculosa Meigen, 1804

= Limonia nubeculosa =

Species of fly

Limonia nubeculosa, also known as the short-palped cranefly, is a species of crane flies in the family of Limoniidae.

== Description ==
This species reaches a body length of 9 millimetres (0.35 in) to 11 millimetres (0.43 in). The wings have a dark pattern on their front edge. The legs (femurs) are coloured yellow and contain three dark rings.

They are found in forests in Europe. They are most common in Central Europe and fly from April to November. It may aestivate in caves during the summer, and be found there in large numbers.

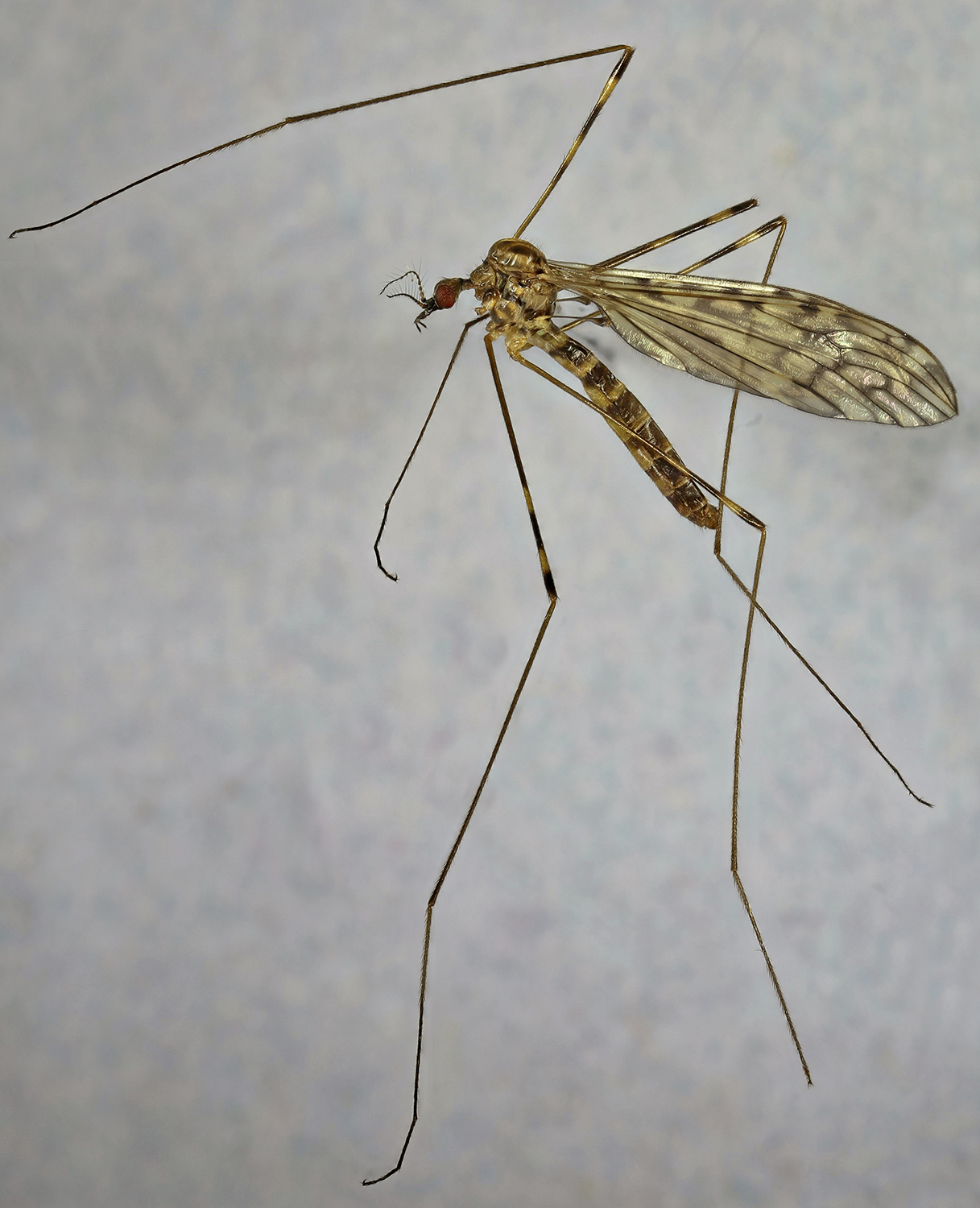

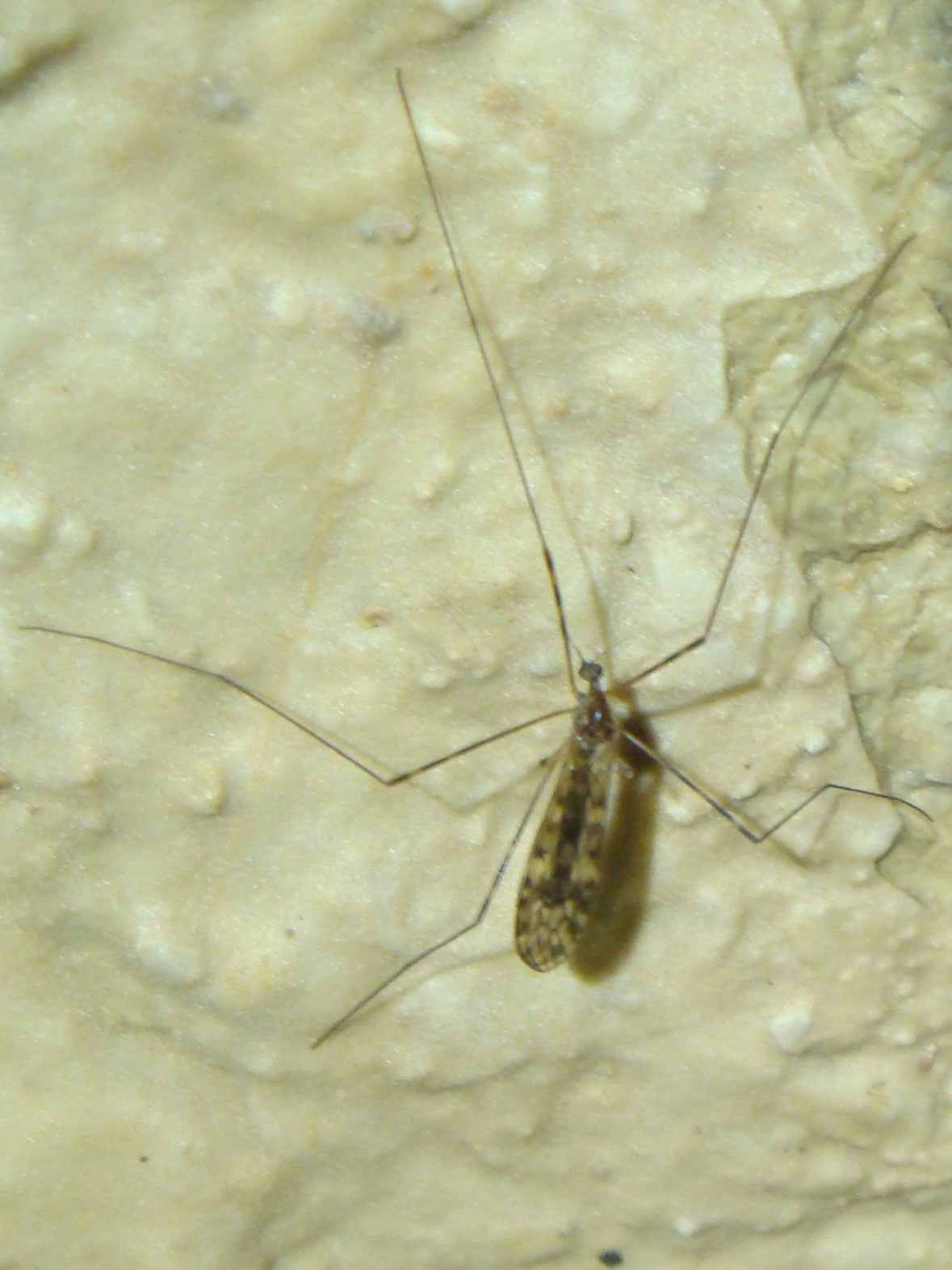
Limonia nubeculosa in a cave, found in southern France.
