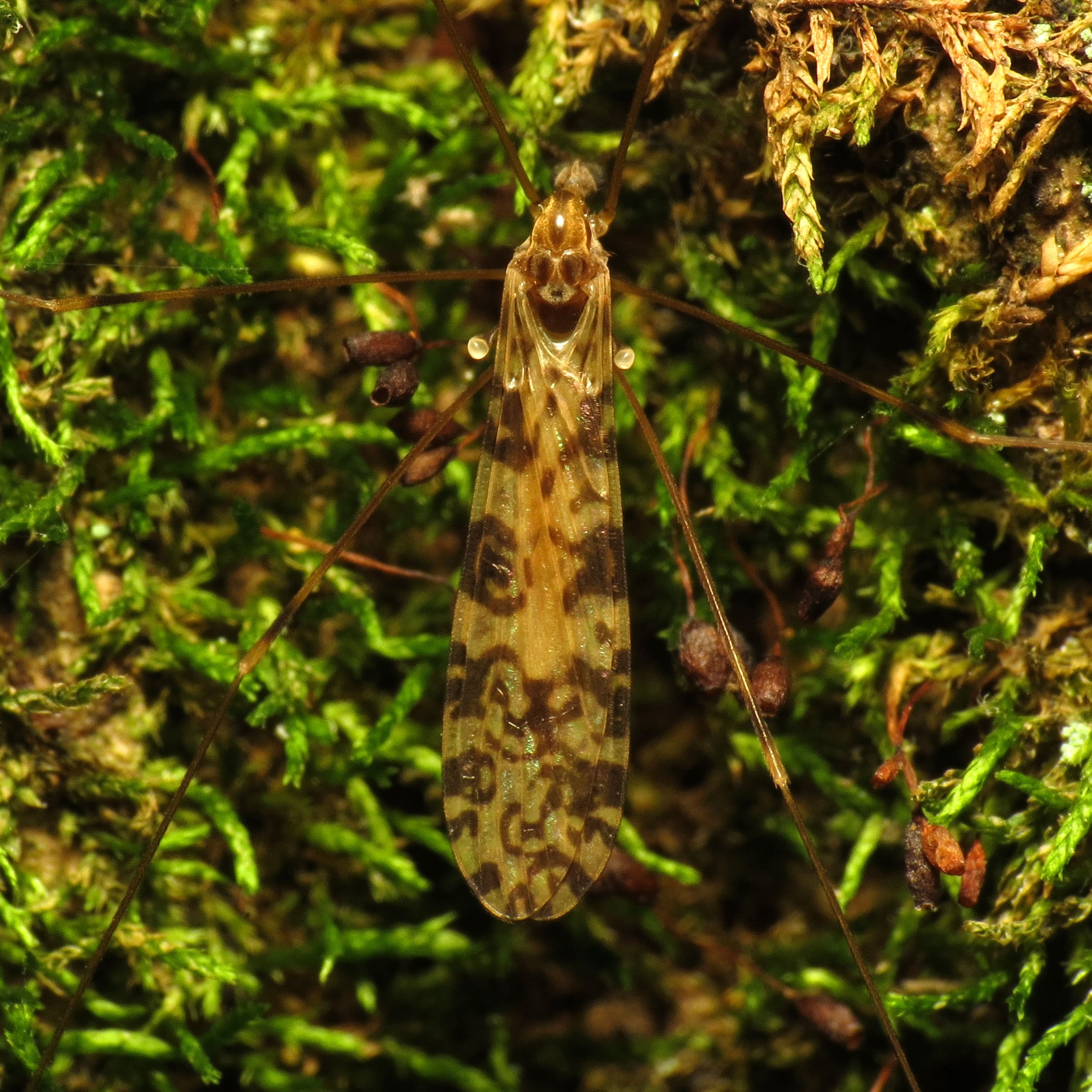
- Limonia annulata

Scientific classification
- Domain: Eukaryota
- Kingdom: Animalia
- Phylum: Arthropoda
- Class: Insecta
- Order: Diptera
- Family: Limoniidae
- Subfamily: Limoniinae
- Tribe: Limoniini

= Limoniini =

Tribe of flies

Limoniini is a tribe of limoniid crane flies in the family Limoniidae. There are about 7 genera and more than 1,400 described species in Limoniini.

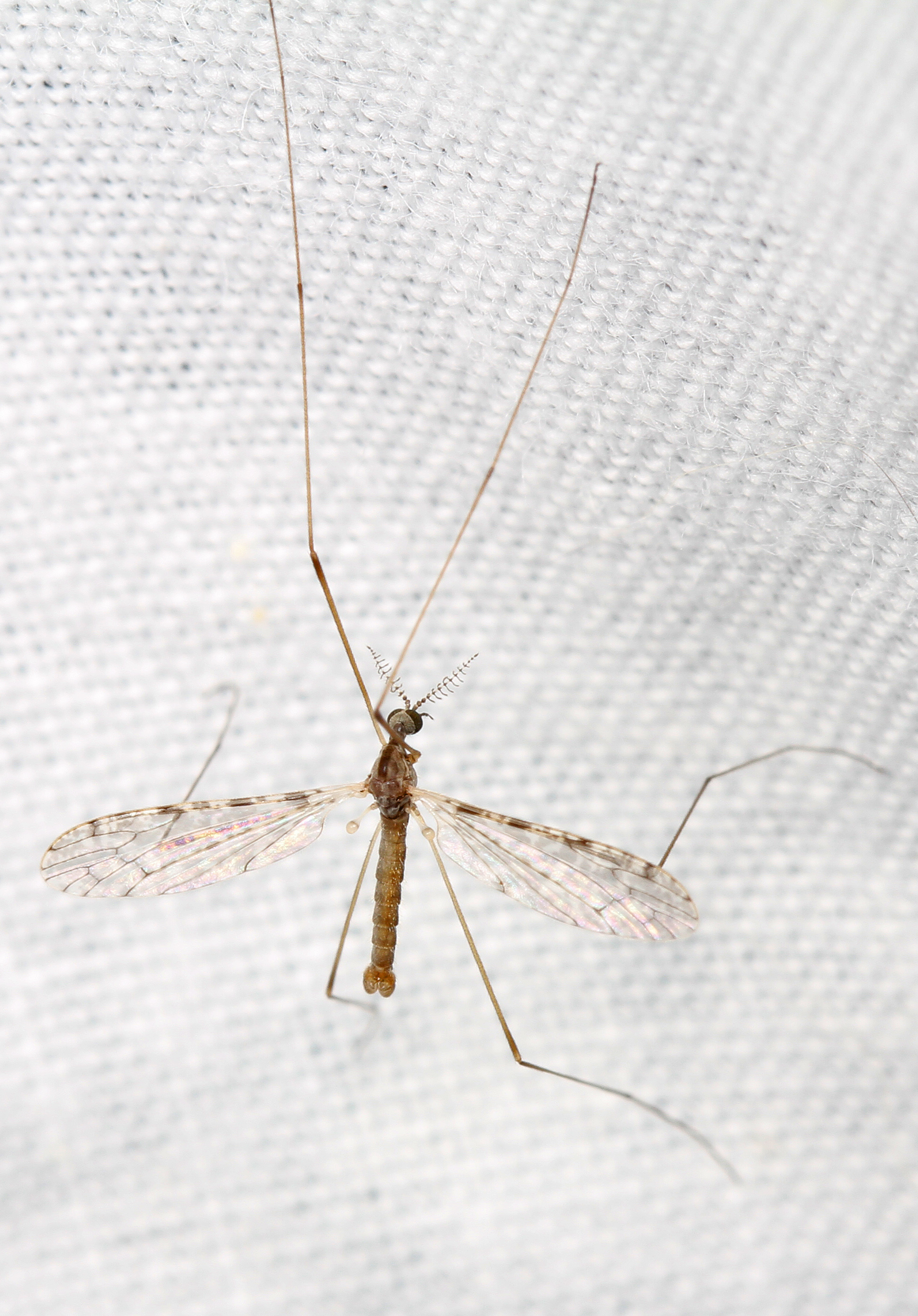
Limonia maculata

== Genera ==
These seven genera belong to the tribe Limoniini:

- Antocha Osten Sacken, 1859
- Dicranoptycha Coquillett, 1910
- Elliptera Schiner, 1863
- Helius Lepeltier & Serville, 1828
- Limonia Meigen, 1800
- Orimarga Osten-sacken, 1869
- Thaumastoptera Milk, 1866
