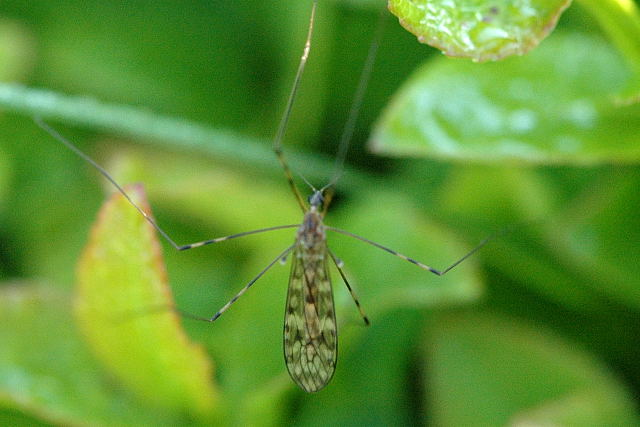
- Limonia nubeculosa

Scientific classification
- Kingdom: Animalia
- Phylum: Arthropoda
- Class: Insecta
- Order: Diptera
- Family: Limoniidae
- Subfamily: Limoniinae
- Tribe: Limoniini
- Genus: Limonia; Meigen, 1803

Type species
- Tipula tripunctata [= phragmitidis (Schrank, 1781)] Fabricius, 1781

Synonyms
- Alexandriaria Garrett, 1922; Amphinome Meigen, 1800; Limnobia Meigen, 1818; Limnomyza Rondani, 1856; Unomyia Meigen, 1818

= Limonia (fly) =

Genus of flies

Limonia is a genus of crane flies in the family Limoniidae. There are at least 430 described species in Limonia. It is somewhat of a 'catch-all' genus, where some members should rightly be placed elsewhere.

== See also ==
- List of Limonia species
