= Forensic entomology and the law =

Forensic entomology deals with the collection of arthropodic evidence and its application, and through a series of tests and previously set rules, the general admissibility of said evidence is determined. Forensic entomology may come into play in a variety of legal cases, including crime scene investigation, abuse and neglect cases, accidents, insect infestation, and food contamination.

== Scientific evidence ==
The admissibility of forensic evidence is left up to the judgment of the court. To provide a strong basis of admissibility for the evidence, accurate documentation is essential so that there is no room for speculation as to the authenticity of the evidence. Given that admissibility is granted, expert witnesses may be called to a courtroom to either support or refute the conclusions that are derived from the evidence submitted.

In order to determine what is and is not scientific evidence, a set of rules or parameters must be established for qualification. There are two basic principles that govern the acceptability of evidence.

=== Frye Test ===
One of these qualifying tests is the Frye “General Acceptability” test. The Frye Standard is the test encountered more commonly in most state proceedings. The Frye Standard states that the scientific community must only accept the evidence after it is supported by a certain amount of valid information. This test is used frequently to disqualify sketchy information such as bite mark comparisons, due to the scientific community's general belief that this can be a subjective and unreliable source and could lead to false conviction or acquittal if used in court proceedings.

=== Daubert Test ===
The second test is the Daubert relevancy and reliability requirement. This federal test is applied to testimony given by expert witnesses. Despite the Daubert Standard's reliability, it is used to a lesser extent in state courts. The information provided by the witness must pass a two-part examination, it must be deemed relevant to the case at hand, and the witness must prove that it came from a reliable source. Evidence presented in court proceedings is subject to extreme scrutiny, so it is very important that the information presented to the judge and jury has been obtained using the Scientific Method. Although these two decisions have been used as standards for many years, much of the decision about what evidence makes it into the courtroom depends upon the decisions of the presiding judge.

== Admissibility of evidence and judicial prudence ==
Information is usually admitted as evidence if it helps to clarify at least one of the five components of analyzing physical evidence: the reconstruction of events or places, identification as used in scientific tests, recognition by separating relevant and irrelevant information, individualization by proving it to be unique to a suspect or a victim, or usage of comparison analysis methods (DNA, fingerprints, etc.). All of these categories, though important, have a lot of gray areas, allowing for the judge to have the final say on what a jury can see and hear in regard to a case.

== Aversion to scientific evidence ==
Judges tend to use more caution when admitting scientific data than when considering other types of physical evidence. This has been linked to a concern that scientific data is given priority over other forms of information. Jurors have been known to take scientific evidence as fact, so judges must decide how reliable the information is before allowing a jury to take that information into account. Allowing too much scientific data can make a case less subjective and give jurors less of a choice in their deliberation; therefore, some judges try to limit charts, graphs, and other forms of overwhelming scientific evidence in relation to a crime. This is one of the main reasons that voiceprints and polygraphs have been denied admissibility in the courtroom. They are both subjective components of scientific evidence, but if presented as fact by prosecutors, the jurors may become misinformed on how reliable the data is, and therefore most judges exclude it. These techniques are still used heavily in detective work, even though they are not admissible in court. These techniques help officers to find other types of evidence that can be brought to court and can help to ensure law enforcement that they are following the correct suspect.

== Other approaches to scientific evidence that may allow its admittance ==
One way that some judges have attempted to admit scientific evidence is in its raw form. By allowing the jury to draw their own conclusions, without confusing jargon and charts, some judges are more amicable to this approach. This requires a basic level of knowledge on how to read the data, which can be supplemented with an expert witness who may offer their own opinion. This is a less harsh approach to admitting scientific evidence.

Judges also place a large weight on the amount of corroborating evidence that can be submitted to support each piece. Typically, a judge will not admit a piece of evidence unless it can be supported by expert testimony, witnesses, or other physical evidence. One piece of evidence in a crime is somewhat meaningless. Many pieces must fit together and support the prosecution's (or the defense's) theory. Similarly, a judge will not grant admissibility to evidence that proves guilt or innocence without a doubt. This rule is eagerly applied to matters of scientific evidence because juries tend to place too much emphasis on certain evidence, particularly DNA evidence, which is believed to be foolproof. It is preferred that the circumstances are reconstructed and confirmed in small pieces. The admission of these pieces is viewed as unfair to the other counsel and is denied. The goal of the court is to leave a decision to be made by the jury after all of the evidence has been presented. Large, sweeping evidentiary discoveries take the subjectivity of the evidence out, especially in regard to scientific discoveries.

== Forensic entomology as evidence in court ==
Using forensic entomology as evidence in criminal proceedings requires the examination of a few other judicial requirements.

=== Federal Rules of Evidence 702 and 703 ===
Most entomological evidence, or evidence dealing with the presence of insect larvae or adults being found at a scene, enters through expert witness testimony. Because there is little common knowledge associated with the discovery of particular larvae at a crime, it is useful for an entomologist to come in and explain what they found and what that could mean in regards to the location of death, the time of death, and other various parts of the case. This type of witness testimony enters under The Federal Rules of Evidence 702 and 703. (Daubert v. Merrell Dow Pharmaceuticals)

=== Use of repulsive and inflammatory evidence ===
One rule that applies very specifically to forensic evidence is that the courts ban inflammatory or repulsive information or photographs. This can be especially difficult for entomologists because photographs of insects feeding on dead bodies tend to be controversial, but they can be crucial in making their part of the case clear. Extreme caution must be used when choosing any photographs of entomological evidence to share with a jury. This rule was put into place in order to avoid outraged jurors. Emotional responses to this type of evidence have proven to distract jurors from the issue at hand, possibly leading them to make decisions based on irrelevant data.

=== Other important considerations ===
Another important factor in creating admissible entomological evidence is creating a clear and consistent chain of custody. This means that any samples taken from a body or the scene of the crime in question must have been labeled correctly and the identity of those persons who had access to it must be recorded. This record should show the location and custody of the samples at all times – from collection to analysis. Typically, an entomologist on the scene will collect their samples and lock them in their scene kit as a way of making sure that no one else has access to them to tamper with the evidence, ensuring that the information gathered in the field is viable in court. If an accurate record of custody is not kept, then the presentation of this evidence could provide a reason for appeal.

== Case records and reports ==
As is the case when collecting and handling evidence, documentation of the source, transfer, and state of said entomological evidence is crucial to a criminal investigation. An accurate record facilitates the tracking of individual pieces of evidence even if the item has been modified after the initial collection; modification can result by means of natural biological processes, like metamorphosis, or the manipulation of the insects by the lab during analysis. Accurate documentation also helps preserve the chain of custody for the evidence collected; it accounts for a detailed record of who has had access to the evidence, and the exact times and locations of when the evidence was moved and for what reason. It basically provides a step-by-step ranging from the time of collection to the court hearings.

Forensic entomologist (FE) records relating to a death scene investigation can be divided into eight categories: initial contact notes, evidence submitted, Death Scene Case Study Form, autopsy report, local weather records, Specimen Disposition and Identification Record, chain of custody record and receipts, and finally, the Case Study Final Report.

=== Initial Contact Notes ===
Initial contact notes include certain preliminary information and the fee charged. The following are key pieces of preliminary information: the contact officer's name, address, and phone number; the death scene's exact location; the type of habitat in that area; the corpse's phase of decomposition; and a general description of the manner of death. When recording the information gathered, the estimated post mortem interval (PMI) made by others at the crime scene should be disregarded in order to guarantee an unbiased PMI from the entomologist.
Since entomology expertise is usually requested well after the recovery of the corpse, inquiries about the kind and amount of insect activity observed and whether the body had already been moved should also be recorded. Finally, the entomologist and the law enforcement organization should mutually agree on a clear fee that appropriately covers all the services to be provided by the FE.

=== Evidence submitted ===
Because it is not always possible for the forensic entomologist to be present at a crime scene to collect the appropriate evidence, it is important that clear and concise instructions are left for the handling of live and preserved specimens to those processing the scene. In these cases where the FE is not present at the scene, the transport of live and preserved specimens is necessary. As a rule, if specimens are in transport longer than an hour, they have to be kept in a chilled insulated container with enough coolant to keep them relatively inactive and stop their development.
All evidence should be handled with a reasonable amount of security; from videotapes and photographs to actual specimens recovered from the field. In all cases, the evidence should be secured with a seal that ensures absolutely no tampering.

=== Death scene case study form ===
As the name suggests, this form is an itemized checklist for the different conditions present at the crime scene. The conditions recorded include temperature, habitats, the presence/absence of sunlight, and other details specific to the crime scene. More often than not, this form merely repeats previously recorded observations. This is because the primary purpose of the Death Scene Case Study Form is to itemize the different findings to ensure that nothing is overlooked.

=== Autopsy report ===
The autopsy report is the responsibility of the coroner, not the forensic entomologist, and must be requested. The most important things to note are the manner and cause of death, where the insects were found on the body, and the extent of decomposition of the body. Because the ME is one of the first people to have access to the body, he/she is usually the one to retrieve specimen samples from different orifices on the body. The specific location of the insects and the extent of their activity should be duly noted on the report. This information helps the entomologist determine an accurate PMI based on the development of the specimens found.

=== Local weather records ===
Accurate weather reports are elemental in a death scene investigation, especially one where any type of developmental insect is involved. Even within a relatively small area, the weather can vary, so it is important that the source of climate conditions is extremely reliable and accurate. For an ideal estimation as per the general maturation of the live specimens found on the body, a record of the ground and ambient temperatures should be taken for several days after the corpse is removed from the scene. To ensure the utmost accuracy it is best to collect weather data from a weather station located as close as possible to the actual crime scene.

=== Specimen disposition and identification record ===
Most of the specimens collected from a corpse at a crime scene are maggots. Insects found in this immature stage of development are incredibly difficult to identify because all maggots have the same appearance when in this stage. It is because of this that most live specimens collected are reared into their adult stage where identification is increasingly easier.

It is in the specimen disposition and identification record that all developmental changes are recorded. Meticulous records of the changes that the specimen undergoes are duly noted and explained. In the same manner, when dissecting the immature insect, proper records must also be taken. Following dissection and proper documentation, all the specimen species are placed together in a labeled vial.

=== Chain of custody record and receipts ===
Evidence is never in one place only; eventually, it has to be transferred among two or more parties, whether it be between entomologists, from the original site of the crime scene to an analytical lab, or between law enforcement departments. Documentation of all these transfers have to be properly annotated on the chain-of-custody records to ensure that the “chain of evidence” is never broken. The receipts serve as verification for the whereabouts of the evidence at all times.

=== Case study final report ===
The final and most important component of a crime scene's documentation is the Case Study Final Report. It is a compilation of all the relevant information gathered in the previously mentioned records and reports.

On it, there will be such information as the contact person's name, address, and phone number, a proposed scenario for the crime and, all relevant details on the crime scene, as well as the last time the deceased was seen alive; as you recall, this is all information found in the initial contact notes. Other relevant information is a list of all evidence collected, including specimens and all identification and rearing procedures performed, a PMI estimate, and a summarized conclusion based on all the findings. Copies of this report are submitted to the contact officer, the forensic entomologist, and as a courtesy, to the medical examiner. If throughout the course of the investigation, any manipulation of the specimens occurred (i.e. dissecting, rearing, then a copy of the specimen disposition and identification form should also be included in the report).

It is important that the FE remains completely objective as he/she documents his findings and compiles all significant evidence and data into this final report. At times, the evidence may allow for several different interpretations, and to remain objective, the FE must explore all these plausible scenarios.

== Expert Witness ==
When a forensic entomologist is called to the stand, his/her expertise is only requested so that he/she may refute or support the Case Study Final Report. It is imperative that objectivity predominates and is not lost as the trial goes on. Although it may be used for referencing and corroboration of evidence, the Case Study Final Report is seldom admitted into court proceedings.

=== Preparation for court ===
The Case Study Final Report is the main focus so that ideal preparation may take place.; this report does, after all, contain all the entomological findings and conclusions relevant to the case. The report should be detailed thoroughly but should still allow room for speculation because forensic entomology is still a relatively new science, and it would be a bit overzealous for the forensic entomologist to announce full certainty on the subject; said speculation should not exist when it comes to the evidence. Disclosure of this report to the opposing side before the trial is recommended so that the defense and/or prosecution have time to consult another expert witness to look over the original findings. Another thing is that proper credit should be given where credit is due; if any of the conclusions derived by the forensic entomologist were seconded by another professional, that person's name and qualifications should be presented as well.

It is the responsibility of the forensic entomologist to adequately instruct on the collection and handling of all specimen evidence. Even though, it is upon them to try to ensure efficient collections, they cannot always prevent inept actions; because of this, the FE can refuse improper analyses and tests performed on the evidence. It is important that the FE is diligent with the procedures and collection, so that when in court, the opposing side can't question the findings.

=== In court ===
First of all, appearances in court merit professional attire. Upon arrival, the FE will wait his turn to be called to the stand in a waiting room. After being sworn in, the supporting counsel will ask for the FE's qualifications. It is vital that all qualifications, awards, published works, fellowships and grants, and all merit are mentioned because this information is what is going to determine whether the forensic entomologist is qualified enough to be an expert witness.

As the expert witness is being walked through the evidence, he/she has to keep in mind that most people have no thorough knowledge of entomology, so the responses to the questions being asked and the explanations about the evidence have to be kept clear and concise and in a simplistic manner that informs and educates, not only the jurors but the judge as well. It is vital that the attorney has a thorough grasp of all the concepts that are being explored so that he/she knows which questions to ask to carry across his point. In the same manner, the responses to the questions being asked by the opposing side should be kept as precise as possible, so as not to give the opposing attorney any ammunition to discredit the findings in the cross-examination.

If any type of photographic evidence is involved, the expert witness has to request permission from the judge or attorney prior to the trial to make sure that the photographs that are to be presented aren’t prejudiced and have the ability to sway the jury. Finally, it is important that the expert witness realizes that replying “I don’t know” to a question is perfectly fine; it is preferable to say that you don't have the expertise in that particular area than to claim that you do and make yourself look like a liar. Before leaving the witness stand, proper notification will be given to the expert witness to see if he is dismissed or if he will be recalled later.

== Case Studies ==
A good example of a case where forensic entomology was successful in determining a postmortem interval is one involving a young prostitute and a thirty-year-old member of the Army. A family member had informed the police of her disappearance four days before her body was found. She had last been seen in the presence of this military man on May 31. A large number of adult flies and maggots were noticed and gathered inside and near the wounds of the young girl. A number of these maggots were kept and grown to be adult flies (reared), and others were taken in their present state. Pictures were taken and enlarged showing the flies around the body when it was found. Using this evidence along with correlating weather conditions known to be present around that time, an entomologist was able to give a postmortem interval. The evidence showed that the flies had arrived on May 31, which indicated a time period of four days since she had died. This information showed the army man to be the last person to be with the girl. When presented with the evidence authorities were able to get a confession out of the man. The use of forensic entomology was definitely a key factor in this case.

Another case where forensic entomology was used successfully deals with a body being reported to be thrown down a well. When authorities searched for the well in southern Indiana, it was clear they found the correct one. Thousands of flies where flying over material blocking the well. The pungent smell and the fact that the flies could not access the body created this swarm. Given that vast number of wells in the area, the presence of the flies indicated the body's presence allowing it to be found in a timely manner. The use of entomology is not only important in determining when a person has died, but also simply locating a corpse.

== Famous cases ==
A handful of well publicized criminal cases helped bring forensic entomology into the limelight and popularized it in the modern era.

=== Paul Bernardo ===
In 1992, the Canadian press went into a frenzy concerning “The Ken and Barbie Murders.” In June 1991, Paul Bernardo and Karla Homolka tortured, raped, and killed fourteen-year-old Leslie Mahaffy. The brutal assaults of Mahaffy were recorded on tape by the couple and helped convict them at trial.

Ten months later in April 1992, Bernardo and Homolka again raped, tortured, and killed another teenage victim, Kristen French over a period of several days, all captured on videotape.

Once captured and put on trial, forensic entomology began to play an important role. In Paul Bernardo's trial, renowned forensic entomologist Dr. Neal Haskell helped establish a timeline for one of the victim's murders. Haskell utilized his understanding of insect development cycles to narrow a fifteen-day time interval down to a period of four days for the victim's time of death.

Being one of Canada's most publicized criminal cases, Dr. Haskell and his testimony brought forth forensic entomology.

=== David Westerfield ===
In the United States, forensic entomology became well known through the trial of David Westerfield in 2002 for the abduction and murder of seven-year-old Danielle van Dam. In this San Diego case, the courtroom became a battle over conflicting reports from four forensic entomologists: David Faulkner, Neal Haskell, M. Lee Goff, and Robert D. Hall. A fifth scientist, William Rodriguez, a forensic anthropologist, also testified on this issue. Danielle had vanished from her bedroom the night of February 1–2; her partially decomposed body was found on February 27. Haskell, Hall, and Faulker argued that forensic entomology established that the body was dumped in mid-February, during which time Westerfield was already under police surveillance (since February 5), while Goff said the victim's body was colonized by larvae earlier than the other three entomologists estimated (his dates were February 9 to 14). His dates were earlier as he used new data from Canada which gives a significantly slower development for that fly species. Richard Merritt, a forensic entomologist and professor at Michigan State University, stated that because each scientist has his own method, this can lead to disagreement, but a lot of the disagreements involve a variation of one or two days, not over a week and a half as in the Westerfield case: “If it's that big a time, someone screwed up”.

All the entomologists, including the prosecution's expert (Goff), gave dates that excluded the defendant by a significant margin - at least four days. Yet the jury rejected that evidence and found him guilty. The foreman explained that he felt “the field was too subjective to exonerate Westerfield”.

The prosecutor, Jeff Dusek, was highly critical of the forensic entomology evidence; in fact, he dismissed the field outright.

=== Other important cases ===
A case that shaped Canadian judicial history and brought forensic entomology into the headlines was the exoneration of Steven Truscott forty-eight years after being indicted for murder. Forensic entomology also played a role in the investigation of the 1993 raid on David Koresh and the Branch Davidians. Due to the publicity given to these cases, forensic entomology was able to seep further into popular culture.

In 2004, the first use of forensic entomology in Brazil demonstrated its importance and potential if executed properly. Twenty-six corpses were found in an indigenous region of Rondonia, Brazil. The bodies of coal miners who came in contact with a group of natives and were brutally clubbed and speared were found. The bodies were excavated and later transported to be autopsied. Arrowheads, spears, and clothing were collected but no larvae, pupae, or casings were recovered from the crime scene. Once the cadavers were autopsied, only fifty-seven larvae were present on the bodies, and unfortunately, a maximum post-mortem interval could not be established. In part because of the humidity and high-temperature environment, the bodies decayed quickly. Since only P. fulvinota, a species that colonizes all stages of decay was found on the bodies, no timeline of succession could be established. Had more thorough work been done on the part of the investigators or the use of DNA in forensic entomology been employed, a more conclusive post-mortem interval could have been established through the casings of stage-specific arthropods.

== The CSI effect and the law ==
From the contributions of movies and television series, forensic interest has increased and multiple branches spur into various fields. Entomology, an important area of research for the agriculture and veterinary sciences, also aids in crime scene investigation and forensic chronology. Coined after the explosively popular CBS series CSI, the CSI effect encompasses the overwhelming impact investigative scientific documentary shows have had on society.

Some notable American institutions such as Michigan State University, North Carolina State University and Texas A&M University have recently dedicated entire degree paths geared towards training skilled and knowledgeable forensic entomologists. West Virginia University’s largest major is Forensic Science with over 400 undergraduates.

From 2000 to 2008, there has been a significant increase in the amount of attention paid by the public to forensic entomology as a science. With more attention given to arthropod development, accurate hypotheses can be formed. By following life cycles and tracking seasonal changes entomologists are able to establish the location and weather conditions of an area, which are both particularly useful to homicide detectives. However, with global climate change and increasing temperatures, the formulas used to calculate post-mortem intervals may become skewed. Forensic entomologists like Gail Anderson, of Simon Fraser University in British Columbia, Canada, can rely on these formulas to provide certainty in their predictions. It is possible for them to estimate the time of death to the exact day even if the person has been dead for a matter of weeks.

The lines blur when pseudoscience dramatized for viewers feeds misinformation and a false sense of security. Problems with jurors arise when they feel unsatisfied. The jury, wanting more conclusive evidence, scrutinizes minute details always expecting some kind of forensic "smoking gun". After watching a season of House M.D. or CSI, the jurors sometimes feel qualified to make expert decisions. Additionally, TV prejudices could leave some jurors wanting a dramatic experience, which can delay progress.

Even before the trial, the CSI effect can train criminals how to remove evidence and how to stage plausible scenarios. Conversely, victims can intentionally leave crucial traces behind. In one case, a victim who knew she was going to be transported, allowed insects to bite her in hopes of being found and traced back to her area.

== Current research and entomological findings ==
The vast majority of forensic entomological casework consists of establishing a very concrete timeline of the events involved in the crime scene. The new set of data provided by forensic entomological casework undoubtedly provides a solid case for either the defense or the prosecution. But as seen in a new series of experiments, the evidence may not be as firm as previously suspected. The use of DNA in forensic entomology is a growing area of research that will become more prevalent in cases as more research is done. In the first experiment, DNA was extracted from a series of immature blue-bodied blowflies.(blow-fly) The age range of the blowflies varied from first instar larvae up to the third day pupal stage. Extracting the target or victim's DNA from the gut of the larvae and pupae becomes inconclusive as you reach the third pupal stage. Therefore, as most samples collected from the crime scene can properly denote the time scene death, there is a chance that the results may be skewed due to improper specimens.

Once the proper specimens are collected, a series of DNA sequencing tests can be initiated. Several methods of DNA sequencing exist to further analyze the gut material of the insect and eventually track down human microsatellite DNA. The sequencing methods currently utilized by forensic labs include STR or short tandem repeat profiling and HVR or the hypervariable regions of DNA. The current DNA analysis on forensic cases and forensic research indicates that STR profiling is generally successful, whereas HVR sequencing proved to be a better choice in DNA testing, as its results had a higher success rate. In new research on DNA analysis; "STR typing of human DNA from fly larvae fed on decomposing bodies" STR profiling created a complete profile in seven of the thirteen cases, and two cases displayed an incomplete set of alleles whereas four of the cases showed incomplete profiling. On the other hand, HVR sequencing was successful in all cases except one, So there is a slight margin of error when utilizing the STR profiling method of DNA typing in forensic analysis.

== See also ==
- Forensic entomology
- Forensic entomologist
