= Patient and mortuary neglect =

Neglect is defined as "giving little attention to, or to leave undone or unattended to, especially through carelessness". Mortuary neglect can comprise many things, such as bodies being stolen from the morgue, or bodies being mixed up and the wrong one buried. When a mortuary fails to preserve a body correctly, it could also be considered neglect because of the consequences.

Patient neglect is similar to mortuary neglect with one major difference: that patient neglect has to do with people who are still living and that neglect could ultimately lead to their death. Patient neglect concerns people in hospitals, in nursing homes, or being cared for in home. Usually in nursing homes or home-assisted living, neglect would consist of patients being left lying in their own urine and/or feces, which could, in turn, possibly attract flesh flies and lead to maggot infestation. It also encompasses patients getting rashes, lice, and other sores from being improperly cared for.

== Types of mortuary neglect and the law ==
The general sign of mortuary neglect (in terms of forensic entomology) is an infestation of maggots or some other insect (such as cockroaches) of a corpse. This should not be confused with insects found on a body before they are transferred to the morgue. The following examples are forms of mortuary neglect that pertain to the ethical treatment of a corpse.

=== Improper embalming ===
Improper embalming is the utilization of embalming techniques that cause premature decomposition of the body especially in cases where the body in question is to be presented in an open-casket funeral. In addition, not refrigerating the body immediately following death, but before the embalming process could lead to rapid deterioration of the human remains as well.

==== Washington v. John T. Rhines Co. ====
On August 29, 1994, widow Marian Washington filed suit against funeral home, John T. Rhines Co., for improperly embalming her late husband Vernon W. Washington. She claimed that the embalming fluid was leaking and that her husband's skin was decomposing at an alarming rate. John T. Rhines Co. re-embalmed Mr. Washington in efforts to make his body presentable. However, they failed to restore Mr. Washington's body completely.

==== Cooley v. State Board of Funeral Directors and Embalmers ====
On May 3, 1956, Cooley, a petitioner of a particular funeral home tried to appeal the revoke of his license by the California state board of funeral directors and embalmers. The case reveals the reasons as to why the license was revoked. Cooley's practices were described as unsanitary for the following reasons: an infant was discovered improperly embalmed after maggots were seeping out of its orifices, commingling of bodies, blood stains were found on the walls, and tools used were not cleaned from one autopsy to the next. Needless to say, the appeal was not granted.

=== Fencing stolen organs ===
This form of abuse consists of selling body parts stolen from carcasses that are sent to the morgue for embalming.

=== Commingling of ashes ===
Commingling of ashes is putting several bodies in the same crematorium during the same burn cycle. This act undermines the respect due a passed loved one.

=== Unauthorized disposal ===
In this form of abuse, funeral home operators dispose of the body in a manner not authorized by the deceased's loved ones.

==== Christensen v. Superior Court of Los Angeles County ====
On June 28, 1990, a court heard a case on a class action suit against multiple funeral service operators. These acts included all of the types of mortuary neglect mentioned above in this section. The case contended that the defendants violated conscionable standards regarding the treatment of the deceased. This practice occurred for nearly a decade and victimized approximately 17,000 decedents and their families.

=== Unethical treatment of the deceased ===
Any violation of the standards that any reasonable person would expect of a Mortuary operator could be considered in this category.

==== Dennis v. Robbins Funeral Home ====
James Dennis, widower of Molly Dennis, sued Robbins Funeral Home on August 24, 1987. Before Mrs. Dennis was to be cremated, Lee Miller, the funeral director of Robbins Funeral Home called the family to see the body. When the family arrived, to their dismay, they found Molly Dennis's body unprofessionally presented in an unhygienic environment as unspecified limbs were hanging off the dissection table and into a dirty sink. Mr. Dennis was not, however, able to successfully sue the funeral home because the judicial history in the area did not include a precedent for funeral home malpractice.

== National Funeral Directors Association ==
The National Funeral Directors Association (NFDA) is an organization in the United States that regulates mortuaries and morgues and their activities regarding the embalming and interring of the deceased. With any complaint including mortuary neglect, the NFDA has a fifteen step disciplinary process it goes through to determine the severity of the situation. After receiving a complaint, a committee reviews the situation even to the extent of an investigation and then they determine the consequences of the violation. Those considered in violation of the NFDA's policies could face punitive action ranging from a warning to suspension from the organization.

== Trends ==
There are certain segments of the health care industry that are seeing downward moves in neglect, while other sections are experiencing unfortunate growth. In modern hospitals the most prevalent form of neglect deals with the patients themselves neglecting their own care. However, in other segments such as assisted living for mentally deficient patients the rates of abuse and neglect are still relatively high.

Mortuary neglect is another segment that has peculiar trends. There are relatively few morticians that just refuse to perform their duties. However, cases of ethically questionable practices can be easily found. Morticians only preserving visible body parts, incomplete embalming and defrauding families are just a few examples of reported cases of neglect.

Increasingly medical journals are recommending that doctors become more active in attempting to persuade parents and guardians of children to either accept or continue treatment for diseases or injuries in order to avoid a neglect case. In the American Orthopedic Journal a case study was presented where a doctor suggested that an effort to convince a girl's mother to adequately treat a case of amblyopia to avoid potential neglect. While a viewpoint arguing this was unnecessary, it shows a growing trend to go beyond traditional measures to avoid neglect charges.

== History ==
From the times of the ancient Egyptians, cases of mortuary neglect have been recorded. The process of embalming is to preserve the dead for burial, as the Egyptians believed the afterlife was just as important as life itself. However, if a woman was married to an embalmer, he would likely keep her preserved for his own benefit until obvious decomposition took place.

Dignity for the dead is now a legal matter, as patient neglect has always been. Abuse in the healthcare system is another huge problem in today's society. Nursing homes and hospitals are preying grounds for predators of the weak and disabled. In 2001 a nursing home in Ossining, New York was closed because of neglect and unsafe conditions that existed for the patients.

== US state laws ==
For the most part, mortuary standards are created by the states, not by the federal government. The following are links to state policies (where available) on mortuary practices:

- Arizona
- Arkansas
- California
- Colorado
- Connecticut
- Delaware
- Florida
- Hawaii
- Idaho
- Iowa
- Kansas
- Louisiana
- Maine Archived 2011-07-19 at the Wayback Machine
- Maryland
- Massachusetts
- Michigan
- Minnesota Archived 2008-03-19 at the Wayback Machine
- Mississippi
- Missouri
- Montana Archived 2009-04-02 at the Wayback Machine
- Nebraska
- New Hampshire
- New Jersey
- New Mexico
- Ohio
- Oklahoma Archived 2008-03-25 at the Wayback Machine
- Oregon
- Rhode Island
- South Dakota
- Tennessee
- Texas Archived 2008-03-16 at the Wayback Machine
- Vermont
- Virginia
- Washington
- Wyoming Archived 2007-08-14 at the Wayback Machine
