= Friedrich Moritz Brauer =

Austrian entomologist (1832–1904)

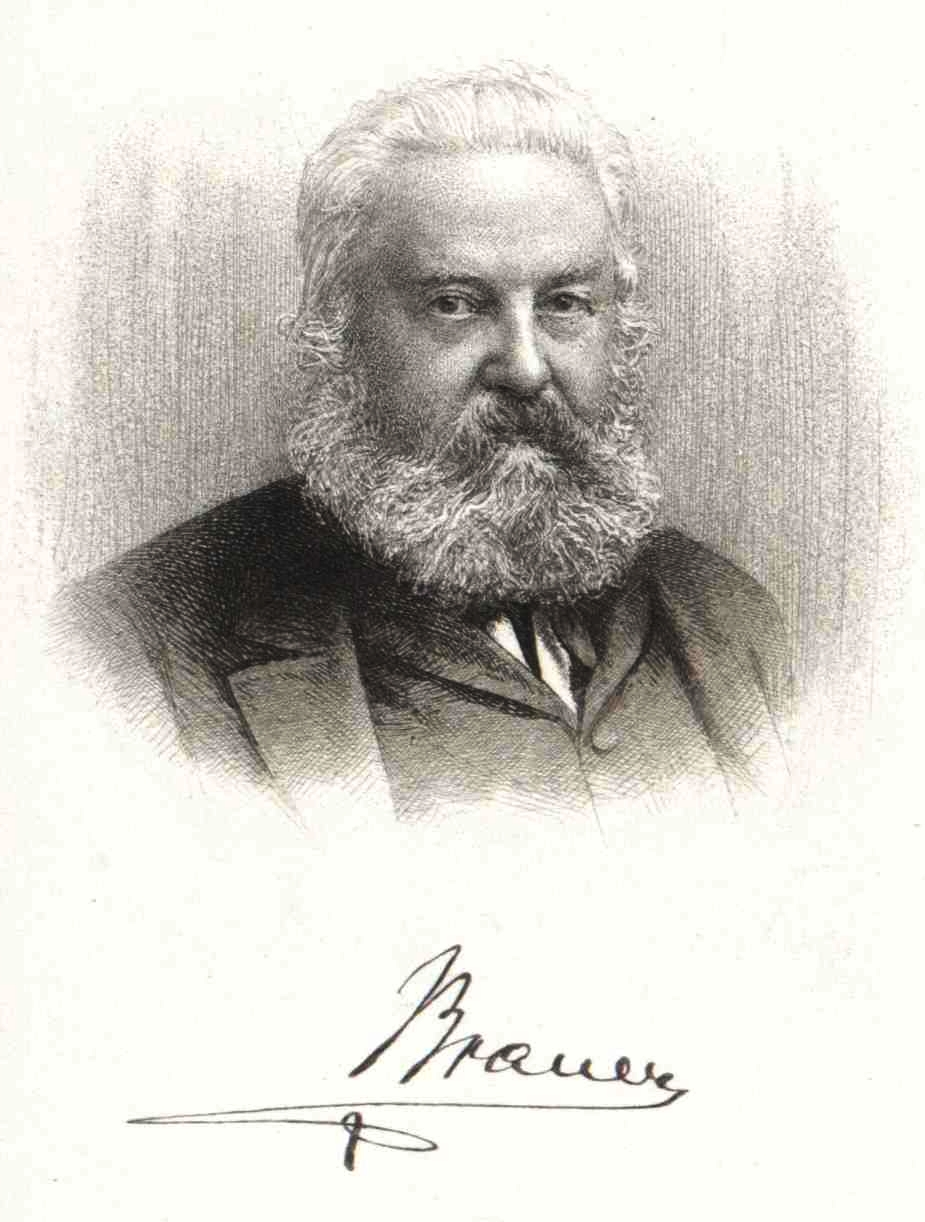
Friedrich Moritz Brauer

Friedrich Moritz Brauer (12 May 1832 – 29 December 1904) was an Austrian entomologist. He wrote many papers on Diptera and Neuroptera. He was director of the Naturhistorisches Hofmuseum, Vienna at the time of his death.

== Life ==
Brauer was born on 12 May 1832 in Vienna, Austrian Empire. From an assistant in the Entomological Museum at the University of Vienna, Brauer became Custodian of the collections in 1873 and in the following year was appointed Professor of zoology in the university. He was elected an Honorary Fellow of the Entomological Society of London in 1900.

Brauer's first work on the order Neuroptera, and his first entomological publication, in 1850, was a revision of the genus Chrysopa. This was followed during the next few years by numerous papers on the biology of the order which established his reputation as one of the foremost European authorities on the Neuroptera.

In 1858 he began studies of the life history of the Dipterous family Oestridae; the result was the publication in 1863 of "Monographie der Oestriden". An outcome of these researches was the erection of two divisions of the Diptera, based mainly on the form of the pupa. The divisions are Orthorrhapha and Cyclorrhapha.

Subsequent investigations into the metamorphoses of the entire order resulted in the publication of System of Diptera "based upon recent advances in anatomy and embryology", which appeared in 1883. This was generally regarded as the best arrangement of the Diptera yet proposed. The system which with a review by Dr. Sharp appears in the “Cambridge Natural History” Insects part 1 p. 175 divides the class into no fewer than 17 orders, the old Linnean "Neuroptera" furnishing 7 of these.

Brauer next worked on Tachinidae and other parasitic Diptera on which he published a treatise, in collaboration with Julius von Bergenstamm.

Brauer identified the Phorid flies collected by the German medical doctor Hermann Reinhard, associated with exhumed bodies from Saxonia, thus contributing to a classic early work of forensic entomology Beiträge zur Gräberfauna. (Contributions on the fauna of graves.) Verh. k. & k. zool.-bot. Ges. Wien 31 (1882) 207–210.

His zoological author abbreviation is Brauer.

== Works ==
- Beiträge zur Kenntnis des inneren Baues und der Verwandlung der Neuropteren. - Verhandlungen des zoologisch-botanischen Vereins in Wein, 5: 701-726
- 1863 Monographie der Oestriden. Vienna: 1–192, Tab. 1-10.
- 1866 Novarra-Expedition: Neuropteren. Vienna, 1866. 104 pp. 2 engr.plts.
- 1878 Bemerkungen über die im kais. Zoologischen Museum aufgefundenen Original-Exemplare zu Ign.v. Born's Testaceis Musei Caesarei Vindobonensis.
- 1878 Über einige neue Gattungen und Arten aus der Ordnung der Neuropteren Lin.. Vienna.
- 1883. Die Zweiflügler des Kaiserlichen Museums zu Wien. III. Systematische Studien auf Grundlage der Dipteren-Larven nebst einer Zusammenstellung von Beispielen aus der Literatur über dieselben und Beschreibung neuer Formen. 100 p., 5 pls,
- 1892 Über die aus Afrika bekannt gewordenen Oestriden und insbesondere über zwei neue von Dr. Holub aus Südafrika mitgebrachte Larven aus dieser Gruppe. Wien, Tempsky
- 1900 Über die von Prof. O. Simony auf den Canaren gefundenen Neuroptera und Pseudoneuroptera (Odonata, Corrodentia et Ephemeridae). Vienna, Gerold.

With Julius von Bergenstamm

- 1889. Die Zweiflügler des Kaiserlichen Museums zu Wien. IV. Vorarbeiten zu einer Monographie der Muscaria Schizometopa (exclusive Anthomyidae). Pars I. Denkschr. Akad. Wiss. Wien 56: 69–180. Also published separately in Vienna, Gerold. 1889, 112 p.
- 1891. Die Zweiflügler des Kaiserlichen Museums zu Wien. V. Vorarbeiten zu einer Monographie der Muscaria Schizometopa (exclusive Anthomyidae). Pars II. Denkschr. Akad. Wiss. Wien 58: 305–446. Also published separately in Vienna, 1891, 142 p.]
- 1893. Die Zweiflügler des Kaiserlichen Museums zu Wien. VI. Vorarbeiten zu einer Monographie der Muscaria Schizometopa (exclusive Anthomyidae). Pars III. F. Tempsky, Wien . 152 p. Also published in journal form, 1894, Denkschr. Akad. Wiss. Wien 60: 89-240.]
- 1895. Die Zweiflügler des Kaiserlichen Museums zu Wien. VII. Vorarbeiten zu einer Monographie der Muscaria Schizometopa (exclusive Anthomyidae). Pars IV. Wien. Also published in journal form, 1895, Denkschr. Akad. Wiss. Wien 61: 537–624.

== See also ==
- Taxa named by Brauer.

== Sources ==
- Anonym 1905: [Brauer, F. M.] - Entomologist's Monthly Magazine (3) 41 73-74
- Anonym 1905: [Brauer, F. M.] - Ent. News 16 160
- Anonym 1905: [Brauer, F. M.] - Insektenbörse 22 45–46, Portr.
- Anonym 1906: [Biographien] - Krancher's ent. Jahrb. 15 196, Portr.
- Contreras-Lichtenberg, R. 2003: Die Geschichte der Dipterologie am Wiener Naturhistorischen Museum. - Denisia 8 47–55, 6 Photos 50
- Handlirsch, A. 1905: [Brauer, F. M.] - Dtsch. ent. Ztschr. 1905 173-174
- Handlirsch, A. 1905: [Brauer, F. M.] - Verh. k.-k. zool.-bot. Ges. Wien 55 129–166, Portr. + Schr.verz.
- Klapalek, F. 1905: [Brauer, F. M.] - Čas. Česk. Mus. Praha 2 79-81
- Kusnezov, N. J.1905: [Brauer, F. M.] - Revue Russe d'Entomologie 5 93
- Musgrave, A. 1932: Bibliography of Australian Entomology 1775 - 1930. - Sydney 31, Schr.verz.
- Nonveiller, G. 1999: The Pioneers of the research on the Insects of Dalmatia. - Zagreb, Hrvatski Pridodoslovni Muzej : 1-390 152
- Osborn, H. 1952: A Brief History of Entomology Including Time of Demosthenes and Aristotle to Modern Times with over Five Hundred Portraits. - Columbus, Ohio, The Spahr & Glenn Company : 1-303
