= Eduard von Hofmann =

Austrian physician and pathologist

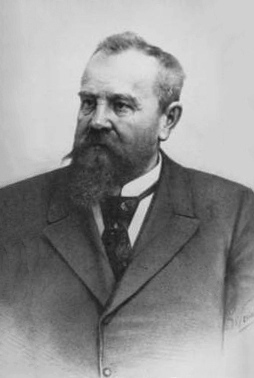
Eduard von Hofmann, ca. 1875

Eduard von Hofmann (27 January 1837 – 27 August 1897) was an Austrian physician who was a native of Prague. He was a pioneer of modern forensic pathology.

In 1861 he earned his medical doctorate at Charles University in Prague and in 1869 became a professor of Staatsarzneikunde (state medical research) at the University of Innsbruck. He obtained this position with assistance from Carl Rokitansky (1804–1878). In 1875, he became a professor of forensic medicine at the University of Vienna.

Hofmann is remembered for his diligent work in the development of forensic medicine as a separate scientific entity. He is credited for introducing and expanding methodologies such as microscopy, spectroscopy and laboratory animal experimentation into forensic medicine in Vienna. He wrote two important books: Lehrbuch für gerichtliche Medizin ("Textbook of Forensic Medicine") and Atlas der gerichtlichen Medizin ("Atlas of Legal Medicine"), the latter of which was translated into English.

Hofmann was instrumental in autopsy studies of the nearly 400 victims who perished at the Viennese Ringtheater fire on December 8, 1881, where carbon monoxide poisoning was deemed to be an underlying cause of death. Also, he conducted the report on the controversial death of Crown Prince Rudolf of Austria (1858–1889) at Mayerling.

With Hermann Reinhard (1816–1892), he was one of the founders of forensic entomology.

== Works ==
On forensic entomology

- Observation de larves de Diptéres sur des cadavres exhumés (Observation on Diptera larvae on exhumed corpses), C.R. Séances Soc. Ent. Bel. 74 (1886) 131–132 (in French).
- Fliegeneier in den Augen- und Mundwinkeln (Fly eggs in eyes and corners of the mouth), Gerichtliche Medicin, J. F. Lehmanns Verlag, München, 1898, p. 188 (in German)
- Hochgradige faule, zum grossen Teil von Fliegenmaden aufgefressene Leiche eines alten Mannes, die erst 16 Tage nach dem Tode aufgefunden wurde (Corpse of an old man found in the stage of advanced putrefaction with marked feeding defects of fly maggots 16 days post mortem),Gerichtliche Medicin, Verlag J.F. Lehmann, München, 1898, pp. 192–193 (in German).
