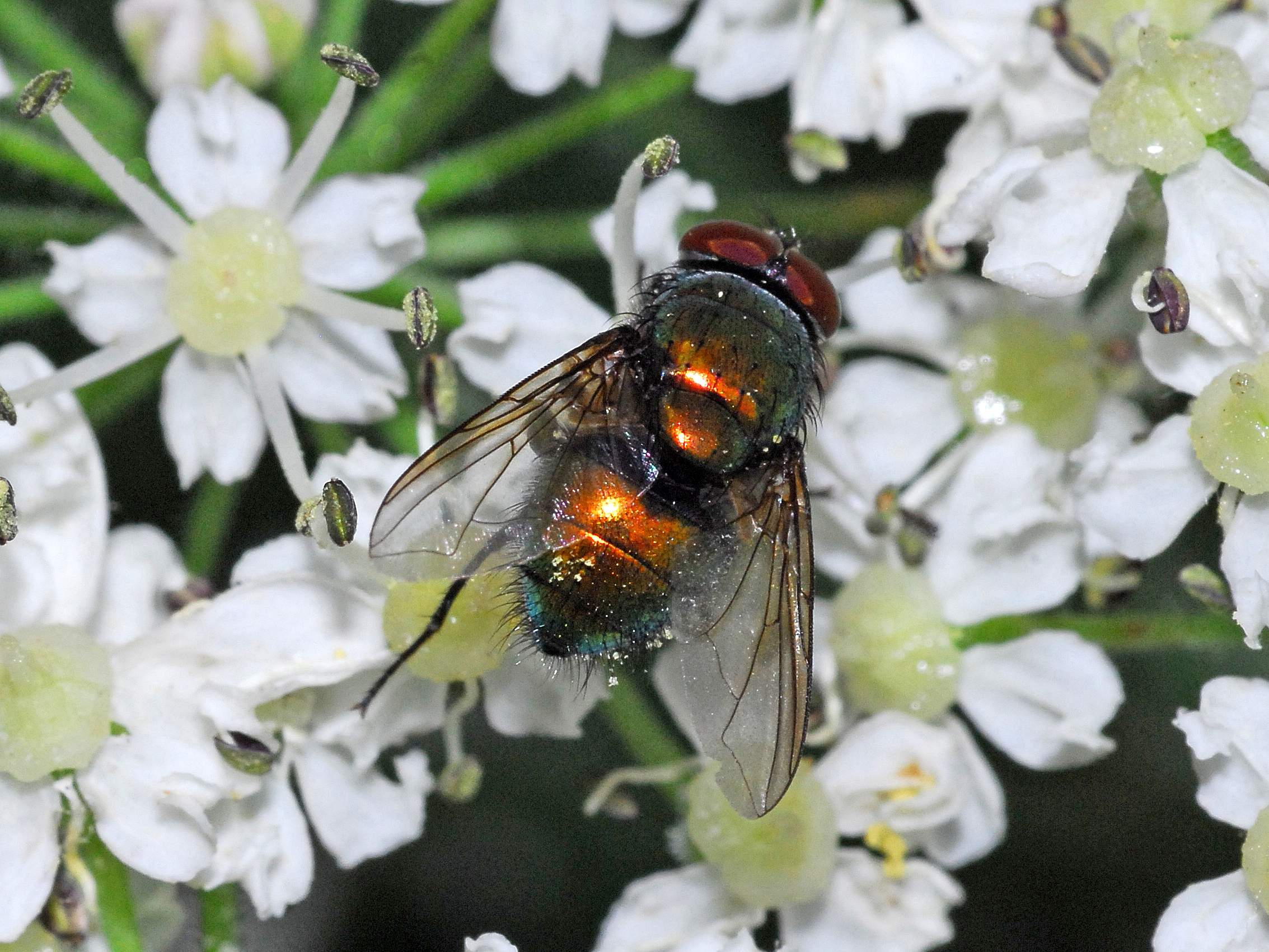

Scientific classification
- Kingdom: Animalia
- Phylum: Arthropoda
- Clade: Pancrustacea
- Class: Insecta
- Order: Diptera
- Family: Calliphoridae
- Genus: Lucilia
- Species: L. illustris

Binomial name
- Lucilia illustris (Meigen, 1826)

Synonyms
- Calliphora simulatrix Pandelle, 1896; L. consobrina Macquart, 1848; L. fraterna Macquart, 1848; L. purpurea Townsend, 1908; Musca equestris Meigen, 1826; Musca muralis Walker, 1849; Musca parvula Meigen, 1826; Phaenicia azurea Robineau-Desvoidy, 1863; Musca illustris Meigen, 1826

= Lucilia illustris =

Species of insect

Lucilia illustris is a member of the fly family Calliphoridae, commonly known as a blow fly. Along with several other species, L. illustris is commonly referred to as a green bottle fly. Lucilia illustris is typically 6–9 mm in length and has a metallic blue-green thorax. The larvae develop in three instars, each with unique developmental properties. The adult fly typically will feed on flowers, but the females need some sort of carrion protein in order to breed and lay eggs.

Due to the predictable nature of development, L. illustris is often used by forensic entomologists to determine time and place of death. Medically, L. illustris is often used for maggot debridement therapy because it only causes myiasis in necrotic tissue. Lucilia illustris was first described by the German entomologist Johann Wilhelm Meigen in 1826. Its specific epithet is derived from the Latin word "illustris", meaning "brilliant".

== Description ==
Lucilia illustris is 6–9 mm in length. Its bucca (cheeks) are colored black with slightly gray pollinose and black hairs. The first segment of the antenna is black; the second generally orange-tipped, and the third segment is about three times the length of the second segment and colored a dark brown or black. The arista (a bristle on the antenna) is dark brown or black, and has cilia that are dark and long. The back of its head is black and there are three to four rows of black cilia behind the eyes.

A metallic blue-green thorax reflects bronze and purple. In some lights, silvery pollen appears on its back, as well as a dark line that extends along the back. Black setae can be found on both the propleuron and the hypopleuron, with brown setae on the prosternum. There are dark brown or black sclerites located at the wing-base, as well as dark brown or black found on the spiracle. Lucilia illustris has black legs, translucent wings, and does not have a costal spine.

The abdomen has similar coloring to the thorax, but looks slightly white in certain lights. The first segment of the abdomen has metallic and dark brown coloring. The second segment has a slight indication of a spot in the middle of the back on the front margin, as well as a row of hardly apparent bristles along the margin. The third and fourth segments both have long upright bristles, but the fourth segment's hairs are scattered and also includes a marginal row of bristles.

== Larvae ==
The larvae develop in three stages, or instars. In the first instar, it is difficult to determine the dispersion of the spines due to some segments not being pigmented. The second through ninth segments each have a full set of spines as anterior borders. However, the color starts to change in the eighth and ninth segments: segment 8 has lighter colored spines and the ninth segment's spines are practically void of color. The spines are reduced to one or two rows in segment 9, but segment 10 has several rows that are lightly colored. Segment 11 is characterized by two or three rows of dark spines as a posterior border on the dorsal side. Segment 12 is characterized by tubercles, with an inner set on the upper border. Cephalopharyngeal sclerite are darkly pigmented.

In the second instar, segments 2 through 9 are characterized by a complete band of spines as a front border (as in the first instar). Segment 8 has spines, but they are only located ventrally and laterally. Segments 9 through 12 have complete bands of spines as a posterior border, but segment 9 only has one or two irregular rows of spines. The tubercles found on the upper border of the last segment have a broad curve and are similar in size to the third instar tubercles. The cephaloskeleton has a dorsal cornua of consistent width until it comes to a point at the posterior end. Six to eight branches are found on the frontal spiracles.

The third instar has bands of spines completely around the spine at segments 2 through 9. Segment 10 has a band of spines, but there is generally a small area on the front that is not complete. There are five or six irregular rows on the back of segment 11. Segment 12 is usually smooth on its dorsal surface. The posterior spiracles are relatively large and darkly pigmented; the anterior spiracles (generally six to eight) have relatively large branches. The cephaloskeleton is also large and darkly colored.

== Behavior ==
Adults of L. illustris feed on flowering plants. However, the female also needs a protein source to mature her eggs and become sexually responsive. Mating will commonly take place in close range of where the eggs will be deposited. The species' sex ratio is generally equal, but around an egg laying vector, the females can be found in masses. Approximately 200 eggs will be laid in a single batch of an adult female, and each individual female can lay up to 10 batches in her three-week life span. Eggs will primarily be found on a carcass, but can also occasionally be in open wounds or excrement. Temperature is a crucial factor in the development time of the blow fly and this particular species. At 25 degrees Celsius, the eggs will take about 24 hours to hatch.

Upon hatching, L. illustris enters its larval stages of development, commonly called a maggot. As in other green bottle fly species, their larvae are carrion feeders and will generally infest any decomposing corpse. Larvae go through three separate developmental stages called instars. Lucilia illustris typically prefers cooler weather, and when ambient temperatures are around 7.7 degrees Celsius, L. illustris will usually be the largest group of maggots on a corpse. Between each instar, the L. illustris larvae will molt. The current instar of the larvae can be determined by examining the respiratory organs, called spiracles. If the maggot mass is successfully identified, tissue loss from the corpse can also be used to determine which instar the larvae are in.

After the third instar is complete, the larvae will go underground and pupate. In ideal conditions, an adult L. illustris fly will emerge from the pupa on an average of 10 days. The adult form of L. illustris is rapidly attracted to carrion. Lucilia illustris larvae can reach the third instar in as few as fourteen days from the time of death.

== Forensic importance ==
Blow flies typically are the first to arrive when blood or body fluid is present. Hence, blow flies are the primary means of estimating a time of death in case work. The life cycle from egg to maggot to adult has been researched thoroughly; therefore, the estimation from egg to adult is accurate within simply a few hours based upon temperature and climate during previous days. This estimation is crucial when determining a time of death to further an investigation. Specifically, L. illustris is found on carrion located in sunlight or otherwise bright areas.

For example, the body of a young woman was found on a roadside in the northeastern part of the United States. Cause of death was a single shotgun blast to the right side of the head. While processing the crime scene, samples of blow fly adults and maggots were taken from the wound. Upon review, entomologists determined the woman had been killed about five days prior to her discovery and that the body had been placed in that location close to the time of death based upon the samples recovered at the scene. Further investigation revealed the woman’s boyfriend as the prime suspect. He was later found hanged in a motel with a suicide note that stated he committed the homicide five days prior in the location the body was discovered.

== Medical importance ==
=== Myiasis ===
Myiasis is the infestation of flesh of living animals by arthropods. Lucilia illustris has been implicated as a myiasis agent in sheep in northerly Palaearctic regions. It is also capable of infesting other wildlife and domesticated livestock which, along with sheep infestations, poses a potential economic problem. It is a facultative myiasis agent, which means that it does not depend on infestation of living animals to survive. It primarily feeds on necrotic tissue when attacking living hosts, which is thought to be part of the reason myiasis evolved as an extension of the normal feeding behavior of L. illustris.

=== Vector of disease causing agents ===
Lucilia illustris larvae have been shown to be a mechanical vector of Clostridium botulinum at levels high enough to cause sickness and even death in pheasants. L. illustris can cause outbreaks of C. botulinum in avian production practices by spreading the bacteria from previously infected carrion to live pheasants. Dispersal from the infected carrion by third instar larvae to pupate can spread the bacteria into other pens of animals. As little as one gram of infected maggot mass has been shown to contain 5.2 times pheasant LD_{50} which is enough toxin to kill several pheasant. More than 5000 larvae have been known to colonize a single carcass, which is theoretically enough maggots to completely infect a moderately sized game pheasant with C. botulinum.

== Current research ==
Recent research involving blow flies ranges from maggot therapy to identifying different species of bird blow flies. Maggot Debridement Therapy (MDT) uses specially selected fly larvae for the cleansing of non-healing wounds. Gangrenous wounds are examples of non-healing wounds that can clinically be treated more effectively by MDT than more common treatments. “Medicinal maggots have three actions: 1) they debride (clean) wounds by dissolving the dead (necrotic), infected tissue; 2) they disinfect the wound, by killing bacteria; and 3) they stimulate wound healing.” According to the Federal Drug Administration, medicinal maggots are the first live organisms to be marketed in the United States.

The effect of blowflies on birds is a current research issue. Species such as meadowlarks, sparrows and finches suffer from blowflies. The blowfly larvae infest the nests, sucking the blood of the nestlings injuring and possibly killing them. Current research on bird blow flies include the study of new species of blow flies, the effect on the hosts and the distribution of the blow flies toward each species.
