= Jean Pierre Mégnin =

French army veterinarian and entomologist

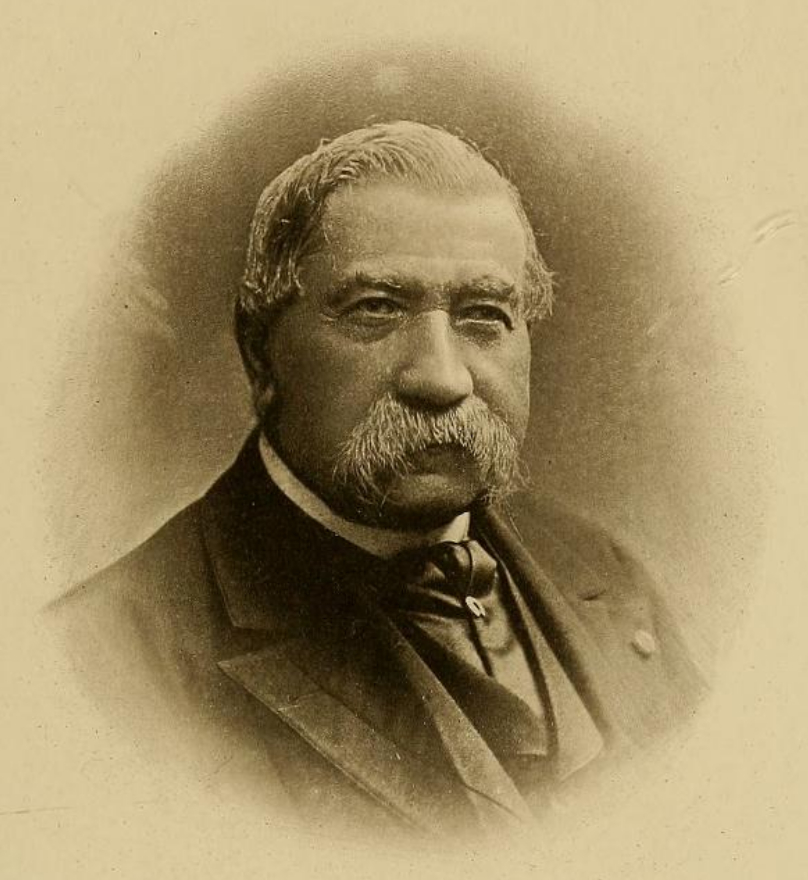
- Born: January 16, 1828; Herimoncourt
- Died: December 31, 1905 (aged 77)
- Citizenship: France
- Education: Ecole d'Alfort
- Occupations: Entomologist, veterinarian

Jean Pierre Mégnin (16 January 1828 – 31 December 1905) was a French army veterinarian and entomologist. He is best known for his work with dogs in the field of cynology. He also contributed to the field of forensic entomology. He led experiments which unveiled the eight distinct waves of insect succession on corpses exposed to air. Similarly, he showed two waves of insect succession on corpses that are buried.

== Biography ==
Jean Pierre Mégnin, born in Herimoncourt, (Doubs), went to school at the Ecole d'Alfort from 1849 until his graduation in 1853. In 1855, he opted for a military career as an army veterinarian and was mainly assigned to Paris or Vincennes. He retired in 1885, the year during which he founded the newspaper l'Éleveur, at which time he was the director of the paper. Previous to that, he had already been involved in journalism by participating regularly, under the pseudonym of Dr. Joanné, in the writing of the journal l'Acclimatation created by Émile Deyrolle.

=== Military career ===
After training at the Saumur Cavalry School, he was assigned to the 2nd Artillery Regiment in 1855. He then served, successively, in the 19th Artillery Regiment in 1860, the 2nd Mounted Regiment of artillery of the imperial guard in 1864, the 3rd Lancer Regiment in 1869, the 15th Dragoon Regiment in 1871, the 25th Artillery Regiment in 1872, and the 12th Artillery Regiment in 1874, which he remained in until retirement age.

He performed the duties of second-class veterinary assistant in 1855, second-class veterinarian from 1860, and first-class veterinarian from 1869. He was also responsible for the district inspection of the military slaughterhouse at Vincennes.

During the Franco-Prussian War of 1870, he was taken prisoner with his unit and he spent several months of captivity in Germany.

=== Scientific work ===
Jean Pierre Mégnin was involved in many fields relating to veterinary and human medicine. The international community recognizes his expertise in parasitology, cynology, hippology and forensic entomology.

In 1878, he became interested in the stable flies of New Caledonia. In 1880, he published Maladies parasitaires chez l’homme et les animaux domestiques (Parasitic Diseases in Man and Domestic Animals) and, in 1906, Les Insectes buveurs de sang (Blood-Drinking Insects).

He demonstrated that through observation of the fauna that are attracted to corpses, it is possible to determine a time of death for a corpse. He published nearly fifteen publications on this subject, including Faune des tombeaux (Fauna of the Tombs), considered the founding work of forensic entomology, a prelude to La Faune des corpses (The Fauna of Corpses) (G. Masson, 1894), a precise application of entomology to forensic medicine: forensic entomology. In particular, he puts in place the theory of squads of carrion insects which successively colonize the corpses of mammals. Although erroneous, this technique is the basis of the calculation of the post-mortem interval for the dating of corpses during police investigations.

== Awards ==
Jean Pierre Mégnin was made a Knight of the Legion of Honor by decree of January 16, 1879. He was also a Knight of Agricultural Merit (1883), an Officer of Agricultural Merit and, in 1877, he was appointed Academy Officer and then Officer of the public instruction.

== Works ==
- Maladies de la Peau des Animaux (Animal Skin Diseases, 1867–1882).
- Maladies parasitaires (Diseases caused by Parasites, 1880).
- Faune des Tombeaux (Fauna of the Tombs, 1887). The founding work of modern forensic entomology.
- La faune des cadavres application de l'entomologie à la médecine légale Paris: G. Masson, (1894).
- 14 papers relating to forensic entomology between 1883 and 1896. These were based on 15 years of medico-legal experience with corpses.

== Societies ==
In 1879 Mégnin was elected President of the Société Entomologique de France. He became a member of the French Academy of Medicine in 1893. He chaired the Zoological Society of London in 1885. He was a member of the Société de médecine légale de France and of the Société de biologie.

The dog breed name Beauceron was used for the first time by Pierre Megnin in his 1888 book on war dogs; previously known as Berger de la Brie for long-coated dogs and Berger de la Beauce for short-coated dogs. Likewise, he introduced the classification of canine breeds according to the lupoid, molossoid, braccoid and graioid types. He described the dog breed standard in many well-documented books.
