= Hermann Reinhard =

German physician and entomologist (1816-1892)

Hermann Reinhard (15 November 1816, Dresden – 10 January 1892) was a German physician and entomologist. He specialised in Hymenoptera (bees and their relatives). Reinhard's medical practice was in Bautzen. In 1881 he worked with Eduard von Hofmann on the insects of exhumed bodies making him one of the founders of forensic entomology.

His collection is in Staatliches Museum für Tierkunde Dresden and Museum für Naturkunde.

== Works ==
- Die Figitiden des mittlern Europa Berliner Entomologische Zeitschrift, 4,. 204-264 (1860)
- Beiträge zur Kenntnis einiger Braconiden-Gattungen. I—III. Berl. ent. Z. 6:

321–336. (1862).

- Zwei seltene Giraud’sche Hymenopterengattungen, Verhandlungen der. k.-k. zoologisch-botanischen Gesellschaft in Wien, 34, 131–134. (1884)
- In Brischke, C.A.G. Die Ichneumoniden der Provinzen West und Ostpreußens. Sehr.naturf.Ges.Danzig, (N.F.), 5(3):121-183 (1882)
- with Friedrich Moritz Brauer Beiträge zur Gräberfauna. (Contributions on the fauna of graves.) Verh. k. & k. zool.-bot. Ges. Wien 31 (1882) 207–210. Classic early text of forensic entomology.
