= Insect indicators of abuse or neglect =

Entomological evidence is legal evidence in the form of insects or related artifacts and is a field of study in forensic entomology. Such evidence is used particularly in medicolegal and medicocriminal applications due to the consistency of insects and arthropods in detecting decomposition quickly. Insect evidence is customarily used to determine post-mortem interval (PMI) but can also be used as evidence of neglect or abuse. It can indicate how long a person was abused/neglected as well as provide important insights into the amount of bodily care given to the neglected or abused person.

Abuse is defined as the use or treatment of something (a person, item, substance, concept, or vocabulary) that is deemed harmful. Neglect is defined as being remiss in the care or treatment of something. Abuse and neglect which results in death or serious physical or emotional harm to a child, an elderly or infirm person, or an animal can be proven by using insect evidence.

== Indicators of abuse and neglect ==
Insects are valuable as forensic indicators in cases of abuse and neglect. Some insects, such as the Green Bottle Fly, (Lucilia sericata (Meigen)), are drawn to odors, such as ammonia, resulting from urine or fecal contamination. Adult green bottle flies tend to be attracted to an incontinent individual who lacks voluntary control of excretory functions. Such examples include a baby who has not had its diapers changed often or an incontinent elderly person who has not been helped in maintaining routine bodily hygiene. Flies lay their eggs in and around clothing and skin which, if left undiscovered, will hatch into maggots (larvae) which begin feeding upon flesh, open wounds, ulcers, and any natural bodily entry point. Over time, the flesh will be eaten away, and the region may be further infected by bacteria or invaded by other insects. This is known as myiasis.

== Techniques for collection of evidence ==
There are two areas that should be examined for insect evidence: the victim itself and then the eggs, instar larvae (1st, 2nd, or 3rd) or maggots which may be found in and around the wound. Maggots should be very carefully removed, without damaging them. Breaking a maggot within the victim releases large amounts of foreign protein, which can result in shock, anaphylaxis, and even death. Maggots, therefore, should only be removed manually and not killed with a chemical treatment, as the death of maggots in the wound can also cause anaphylaxis. If only a few maggots are present, they can be removed by hand. Special techniques in removal include flushing the area with water to remove the maggots or using a delicate brush to retrieve young instars. For the health of the victim, all maggots should be removed, if possible. Although the maggots are often those that feed only on dead tissue and are probably not harming the human or animal, many species will feed on living tissue and cause damage. Insect species cannot be determined until it has been examined under a microscope and properly identified for further investigation.

== Application of entomological evidence ==
Forensic entomologists utilize collected insect evidence to determine post mortem interval (PMI), which is presented when proceeding in criminal investigations as it gives insight into the circumstances of a crime. In cases of death, PMI can be employed to link suspects to the crime scene as well as to identify that the corpse was relocated from the original place of death. Other applications include using entomological evidence to determine the cause of death, whether that be the result of abuse/neglect or something else. For example, maggots - the larvae of blow flies - can provide scientists information regarding the amount of time someone or something had been neglected and where the site of traumatic injury is since blow flies are known to be attracted to openings in the body.

== Types of abuse and neglect ==
The three main categories of abuse/neglect seen in forensic entomology are as follows:

- Child abuse/neglect
- Elderly or nursing home abuse/neglect
- Animal abuse/neglect

=== Child abuse or neglect ===
The United States Federal Child Abuse Prevention and Treatment Act (CAPTA), as amended by The Keeping Children and Families Safe Act of 2003, defines child abuse and neglect as, at minimum: any recent act or failure to act on the part of a parent or caretaker, which results in death, serious physical or emotional harm, sexual abuse or exploitation; or an act or failure to act which presents an imminent risk of serious harm. A child is defined as a person under the age of eighteen. Within the parameters of CAPTA, each state is responsible for individually defining child abuse, neglect, and dependence and outline the care expected of parents and caregivers. In abuse cases, the most abused children are male aged from several months to 10 to 11 years old. The typical abusers are parents, live-in friends, guardians, or babysitters, and only rarely by a sibling or other child.

The recognition of abuse is not always beyond doubt. Some usual symptoms of child abuse/neglect include malnutrition, bruises or abrasions, healing fractures, and repetitive or cumulative injuries upon examination of skin, soft tissues, and bones. In proven child and abuse cases, as determined by the aforementioned constraints, forensic entomology can be utilized in estimating the time since the abuse last occurred, and in fatal cases, the post-mortem interval (PMI). Furthermore, blowfly larvae and pupae can produce evidence that may determine the length of neglect.

Case Study: The child of an incarcerated father and heroin-addicted prostitute mother, was found on July 10, 2000, in the home of a 20-year-old woman in Germany. Social workers had visited the house at the urging of neighbors, but there was never evidence found that neglect was occurring. An autopsy showed no signs of previous fractures, illness or drugs, but the child was malnourished. Specimens of Muscina stabulans (false stable fly) and Fannia canicularis (lesser house fly) were recovered from the genital area of the corpse. These particular flies are attracted to urine and/or feces much more than corpses. With the aid of this evidence and the third fly species recovered from the body, Calliphora vomitoria (bluebottle fly), the forensic entomologists could not only estimate the time of death but prove that the child would have lived if proper legal action had been pursued against the negligent caregiver. The mother received a five-year prison sentence, and two social workers were charged with duty of care violation.

Case Study: A two-year-old male child showing signs of malnourishment and suffering severe enteric pain and bleeding was admitted to a hospital in Ireland. Investigative surgical procedures revealed tissue lacerations. Spicules from the tissue samples and a partial larva were identified as the cause. Larvae of Dermestes lardarius (larder beetles) were also found in large numbers in boxes of biscuits in the kitchen at the child's home. Neglect was demonstrated.

Case Study: A four-year-old child with a high fever and covered with several hundred Dermanyssus gallinae (red mite) and their bites was abandoned at a hospital in Ireland. Investigators traced the child to a caravan occupied by "travelers" parked near a hen house where the birds were heavily infested with the mite. Abandonment and neglect (of both the child and birds) were proven. Eradicating the mites from the hospital proved more difficult.

=== Elder abuse or neglect ===
Elderly abuse is the act of using physical force against an elderly person that causes them physical harm and elderly neglect is the act of not providing for their basic needs. In typical elderly abuse cases, victims are generally older widowed women living on fixed incomes. The typical abuser is usually a family member such as a spouse or child, but non-relatives such as nursing home attendants can play a part. Most instances of abuse and neglect go unreported because the elderly person is too afraid to speak up.

The usual symptoms of elderly abuse are anything that would be visible such as broken bones, bed sores, cuts, bruises, etc. The symptoms of neglect are harder to put a finger on because they are much less noticeable. Signs are lack of food and water, not bathing regularly, wearing the same clothes repetitively, weight loss, withdrawal from social contact, depression, and anxiety. Forensic entomologists can use insects to determine the post-mortem interval and whether or not the person was neglected. There are several cases where neglect was found to be a major factor in the person's death.

Case Study 1: An elderly woman was found dead in October 2002 in her apartment in Cologne, Germany. The bathroom was very dirty with the bathtub full of water and clothing. Larvae were found on the body but more importantly, dead adults of Muscina stabulans (false stable fly) were found on the floor and on a windowsill. No blowflies could be found but larval tracks could be seen around the body. The post-mortem interval was estimated to be about three weeks. This was strong evidence for neglect because the caregiver was supposed to check on the woman every week.

Case Study 2: An elderly woman was found dead in September 2002 in her apartment in Germany. Her foot, which she had wrapped in a plastic bag, was infected with Lucilia sericata (green bottle fly) larvae. The woman did not clean her toilet and had placed clothing in it, which encouraged flies. The post mortem interval was estimated to be about two days. The maggots were estimated to be about 4 days old. It was found that the maggots had been feeding on her foot for a week while she was still alive.

Case Study 3: An elderly woman was found dead in March 2002 in her apartment in Germany. Several insects were found on the body: larval Fannia canicularis (lesser house fly), larval Muscina stabulans (false stable fly), and adult Dermestes lardarius (larder beetle). Fannia are drawn to feces and urine, and their presence is strong evidence of neglect. The woman probably had not changed clothes or bathed in some time. She had developed pressure spots where her head had been resting on her chest for long periods of time. If she had been taken care of, the caregiver would have noticed these wounds.

=== Animal abuse or neglect ===
According to the Humane Society, intentional animal cruelty, or animal abuse, is knowingly depriving an animal of food, water, shelter, socialization, or veterinary care or maliciously torturing, maiming, mutilating, or killing an animal.

Myiasis is the leading entomological evidence used to prove abuse and neglect in animals. Leading causes of myiasis in animals occur when there is an injury or the presence of excretory material, making the living animal alluring to insects. The following characteristics have to be present for myiasis to happen in a pet animal. There has to be abuse or neglect that causes an injury with blood, decaying tissue, feces or urine that attracts flies and the animals must be fairly helpless or incapable of cleaning themselves. In long-coated animals, matts and burrs can cause irritation which leads to hot spots, scratching, open lacerations, and infestation. Animals with long mats and coats are especially prone to the building of excrement around the genital area. This circumstance worsens when the animal is elderly or hindered and can no longer clean itself. Risk factors are further intensified if the animal spends most of its life outdoors and is vulnerable to external environments. Regular grooming and check-ups can significantly reduce these risks. In addition, eliminating other fly attractants, such as uneaten food and fecal matter, can also reduce risks. The summer season is when the highest risk occurs because insects are more common during this time.

Myiasis often occurs in wild, and domestic animals. In particular, rabbits, pigs, dogs, and sheep can be victims of “blowfly strike” because of the urine or fecal matter stuck to their fur, fleece, or hind quarters through neglect, poor captivity and living conditions, or ill health. “Blowfly strike” is a well-recognized and economically damaging problem primarily seen in sheep. “Blowfly strike” is estimated to cost the Australian sheep industry at least $161 million annually. 9 of the 10 cases submitted by the British Columbia Veterinary Medical Association stated that the insects colonizing most animals were the metallic Blue-Green Blow Fly (Lucilia illustris, Meigen) or the Green Bottle Fly (Phaenicia sericata, Meigen). In one case, the larvae of botfly (Cuterebra jellison, Curran) colonized a pet rabbit. Lucilia illustris and Phaenicia sericata are common and ubiquitous blowfly species that are frequently reported in forensic cases involving human homicide and wildlife crime.

Case Study 1: One veterinarian reported that a dog presented with severe edema of the muzzle and several maxillary fractures of unknown cause. The maxilla was wired, and the dog was sent home. Four days later the owner noticed that skin and subcutaneous tissue appeared to be sloughing, so the veterinarian was again consulted. On closer examination, some of the teeth were found to be fractured and rotting and therefore, were extracted. At this point, maggots were observed throughout the injured area, and the veterinarian took several radiographs. The radiographs indicated that almost 100 pieces of lead buckshot were present throughout the area. In this case, the presence of the maggots alerted the veterinarian to the more serious nature of the injuries.

Case Study 2: A civilian reported liquid leaking from a neighbor's garage and mentioned hearing barking and whining for weeks. Investigators made the discovery of a deceased dog, a food bowl occupied with an unknown substance, and a bag of feces all in separate areas of the garage. Each was congregated with differing species of fly larvae. Identification of the larvae stage in the life cycle (1st, 2nd, or 3rd instar) enabled scientists to come to conclusions regarding the neglect of each of the three situations. The forensic entomologists estimated how many days the animal had been deceased, how many days the bag of feces had been left there, and how many days the food bowl was exposed.

== Forensically important species ==
Species of importance include:

- Lucilia sericata (Meigen) – Green Bottle Fly
- Lucilia illustris (Meigen) –Green Bottle Fly (found often in animal crime and human homicide)
- Muscina stabularis - False Stable Fly
- Fannia canicularis - Little House Fly/ Latrine Fly
- Calliphora vomitoria – Blue Bottle Fly
- Musca domestica (Linnaneus) – House Fly
- Phormia regina (Meigen) - Black Blow Fly
- Cuterebra jellisoni – Bot Fly (primarily in wildlife, especially rabbits)
- Dermestes lardarius – Larder or Bacon Beetle

== Current research ==
Currently, extensive research on insect indicators of abuse or neglect is being conducted and published by Mark Benecke, a German forensic entomologist. Unfortunately, the majority of the research material available (such as case studies) is written in German. Further investigation about entomological evidence used in abuse or neglect cases in all probability exists yet is not currently published or available to the general public.

== Conclusion ==
The field of forensic entomology is an ever-expanding one. As more case studies are presented and more research is conducted the ability to use insects as determining evidence in cases of abuse or neglect grows. Currently, the use of insects as indicators of abuse or neglect is not a common occurrence. Although popular culture illustrates forensic entomology as a strict determining factor in legal cases, science is generally used as an aid to elicit more evidence.

== See also ==
- Scientific evidence (law)
- Entomology
