= Use of DNA in forensic entomology =

Forensic entomology has three sub-fields: urban, stored product and medico-criminal entomologies. This article focuses on medico-criminal entomology and how DNA is analyzed with various blood-feeding insects.

Forensic entomology can be an important aspect for law enforcement. With the magnitude of information that can be gathered, investigators can more accurately determine time of death, location, how long a body has been in a specific area, if it has been moved, and other important factors.

Although DNA recovered from blood-feeding insects such as bedbugs (Cimex lectularius) has not been widely used in criminal casework, ongoing research has shown its potential to identify individuals from residual blood meals. As a result, this technique is considered an emerging tool in forensic science, and can possible be a future application in investigations.

== Blood meal extraction ==
Blood meal extraction is taken from the abdomen of an insect in hopes of isolating and analyzing any DNA present. The DNA is extracted by dissecting and collecting tissue from the posterior end of the abdomen, using a razor blade to cut as close to the posterior as possible. This is done to avoid cutting into the insects stomach, contaminating the DNA sample. Species-specific primers can be used to separate and isolate DNA from different individuals, if they are present in the same sample. Once extracted and isolated, the DNA sample undergoes a polymerase chain reaction (PCR), which amplifies and identifies it.

PCR works by analyzing species specific mitochondrial DNA. PCR is currently the most commonly used method of species identification. This is because the PCR method is highly specific and sensitive, and only requires a small amount of biological material to run. This sample can then be frozen and stored until needed.

DNA takes approximately 1 hour to reach the insect's abdomen. This means that DNA can be amplified primarily between 1 to 44 hours after an insect feeds. Samples taken from bed bugs can create full DNA profiles within 72 hours, and partials for much longer. Some research suggests that the source of a blood meal can be determined up to two months post-feeding.

Amplification of the DNA obtained is done the same as standard PCR. A chromatograph is conducted on agarose gel, stained, and viewed with UV fluorescence. The DNA is identified by looking for genome specific repetitive elements and by comparing it with known examples.

== Haematophagous insects of forensic importance ==
Humans are constantly fed on by haematophagous (blood feeding) insects. The ingested blood can be recovered and used to identify the person from which it was taken. Bite marks and reactions to bites can be used to place a person in an area where those insects are found.

=== Order Diptera ===
The following among the flies (Diptera) have been utilized:

- Mosquitoes, Family Culicidae
  Due to erratic feeding habits, mosquitoes can provide valuable DNA evidence. Multiplex PCR enables reliable identification of bitten individuals from just one mosquito, even few days after taking a blood-meal. The insects would need to be collected as soon as possible due to the insect's high mobility, digestion of consumed blood (degradation of DNA) and repeated feeding, although dead specimens are also potentially valuable source of evidence DNA. Research is centered on the mosquito due its widespread presence and affinity for feeding on humans.
- Biting midges, Family Ceratopogonidae
- Tsetse flies, Family Glossinidae
- Sheep keds, Family Hippoboscidae
- Stable and horn flies, Family Muscidae
- Sand flies, Family Psychodidae, Subfamily Phlebotominae
- Snipe flies, Family Rhagionidae
- Black flies, Family Simuliidae
- Horse flies, Family Tabanidae

=== Order Siphonaptera ===
Listed here are fleas commonly encountered by humans that could potentially be used for DNA identification.

- Sticktight and chigoe flea, Family Hectopsyllidae (formerly Tungidae)
- Cat flea (Ctenocephalides felis)
- Northern rat flea (Nosopsyllus fasciatus)
- Human flea (Pulex irritans)
- Oriental rat flea (Xenopsylla cheopis)

=== Order Hemiptera ===
- Bedbug (Cimex lectularius)

Cimex lectularius is an obligate parasite of humans. Testing a sample of a residence's bed bug population and screening for bites could reveal possible recent visitors to the structure, as they have been observed to feed approximately once a week in temperate conditions. A recent re-emergence of bedbug populations in North America as well as growing interest in the field of forensics may prove bedbugs to be useful investigative tools. Recent studies have revealed that human DNA can be recovered from bed bugs for up to 60 days after feeding, thus demonstrating the potential use of this insect in forensic entomology

- Assassin bugs, Family Reduviidae

=== Order Phthiraptera ===
Lice can be indicators of contact with another person. Many species closely associated with humans can be easily transferred between individuals. DNA identification of multiple individuals using blood meals from body and head lice has been demonstrated in laboratory settings.

==== Suborder Anoplura ====
- Head louse (Pediculus humanus capitis)
- Body louse (Pediculus humanus humanus)
- Pubic louse (Pthirus pubis)

=== Order Ixodida (Arachnida) ===
Ticks are classified as Arachnids, but can still be used to analyze DNA due to parasitism. Due to the low probability of a tick detaching and falling to the ground at the scene of the crime, these may not be highly useful regardless of the large amount of blood and lymph they ingest. However, should an engorged tick be found in an area of interest, it would likely contain sufficient genetic material for identification.

== Analysis of collected DNA ==
DNA identification of species can be a useful tool in forensic entomology. Although it does not replace conventional identification of species through visual identification, it can be used to differentiate between two species of very similar or identical physical and behavioral characteristics. A thorough identification of the species through conventional methods is needed before an attempt at DNA analysis. This DNA can be obtained from practically any part of the insect, including the body, leg, setae, antennae, etc. There are about one million species described in the world and many more that have still not been identified. A project termed "the barcode of life" was launched by Dr. Paul D. N. Hebert, where he identified a gene that is used in cellular respiration by all species, but is different in every species. This difference in sequence can help entomologists easily identify two similar species.

DNA sequencing is basically done in three steps: polymerase chain reaction (PCR), followed by a sequencing reaction, then gel electrophoresis. PCR is a step that cleaves the long chain of chromosomes into much shorter and workable pieces. These pieces are used as patterns to create a set of fragments. These fragments are different in length from each other by one base which is helpful in identification. Those sets of fragments are then separated by gel electrophoresis. This process uses electricity to separate DNA fragments by size as they move through a gel matrix. With the presence of an electric current the negative DNA strand marches toward the positive pole of the current. The smaller DNA fragments move through the gel pores much more easily/faster than larger molecules. At the bottom of the gel the fragments go through a laser beam that emits a distinct color according to the base that passes through.
