= Forensic entomology =

Application of insect and other arthropod biology to forensics

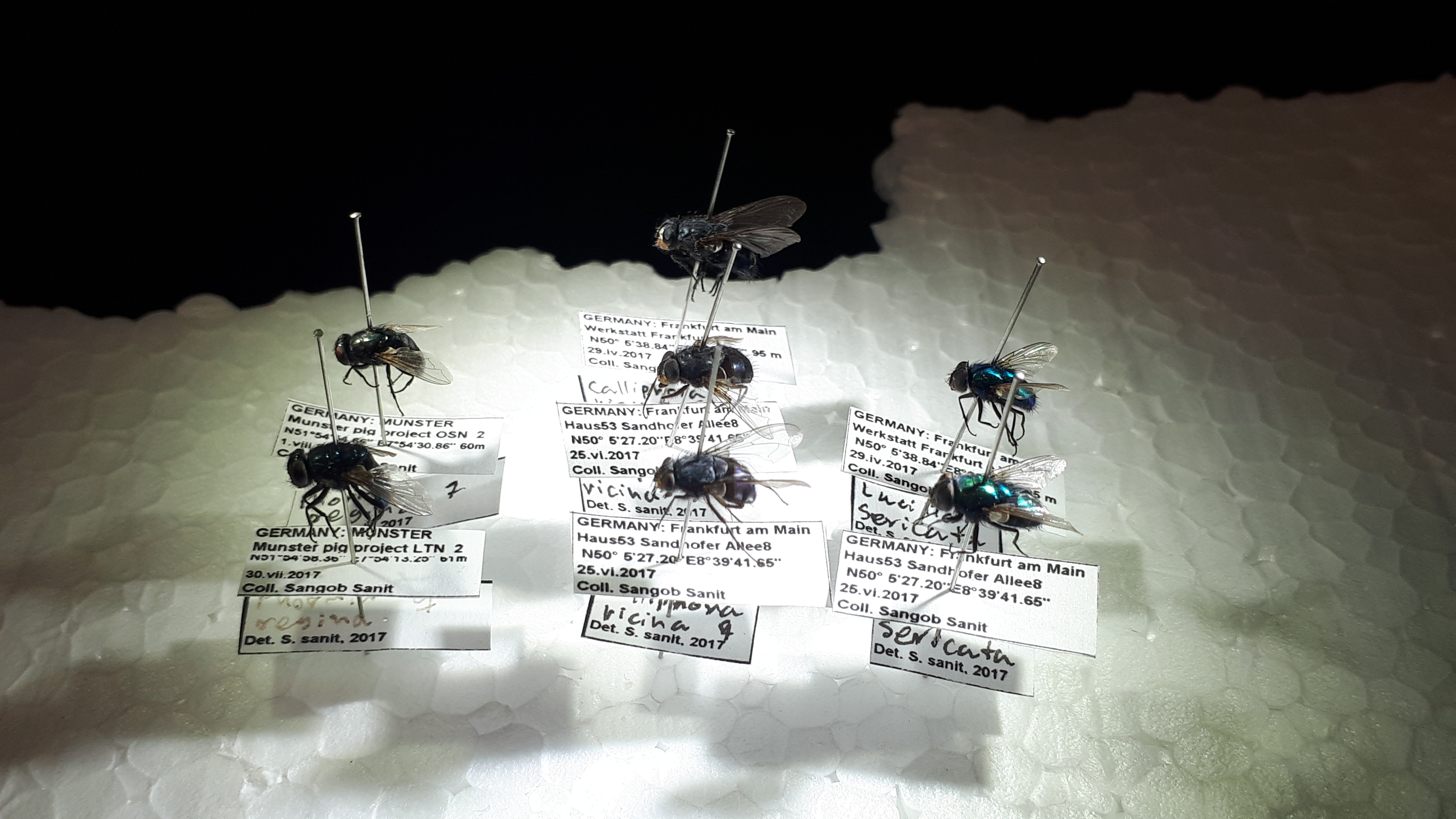
Pinned blowflies, studied in forensic entomology

Forensic entomology is a branch of applied entomology that uses insects and other arthropods as a basis for legal evidence. Insects may be found on cadavers or elsewhere around crime scenes in the interest of forensic science. Forensic entomology is also used in cases of neglect and abuse of a property, as well as subjects of a toxicology analysis to detect drugs and incidents of food contamination. Therefore, forensic entomology is divided into three subfields: medico-legal/medico-criminal entomology, urban, and stored-product.

The field revolves around studying the types of insects commonly found in and on the place of interest (such as cadavers), their life cycles, their presence in different environments, and how insect assemblages change with the progression of decomposition (the process of "succession"). Insect assemblages can help approximate a body's primary location, as some insects are unique to specific areas. In medico-criminal cases, the primary goal is often to determine the postmortem interval (PMI; time since death) to aid in death investigations.

Insect succession patterns are identified based on the time a species spends in each developmental stage and the number of generations produced since the insect's introduction to a food source. By analyzing insect development alongside environmental data such as temperature, humidity, and vapor density, forensic entomologists can estimate the time since death, as flying insects are attracted to a body shortly after death. This field also provides clues about antemortem trauma and the displacement of a body after death.

== Subfields ==
=== Urban ===
Urban forensic entomology typically concerns pest infestations in buildings, gardens, or other urban environments, and may be the basis of litigation between private parties and service providers such as landlords or exterminators. For instance, urban forensic entomology can be used to evaluate the efficiency of pest control techniques such as pesticide treatments, ascertaining the size of an infestation, and identifying the responsible party in situations involving infestations in rental homes. Urban forensic entomology can also assist in determining liability when stored goods, like grains or packaged foods, are contaminated with insects, helping to identify the infestation's origin. These techniques may be used in stored products cases where they can help to determine the chain of custody, when all points of possible infestation onset are examined to determine who is at fault. Moreover, environmental management and public health depend heavily on urban forensic entomology; researchers can track the transmission of disease carried by insects by examining insect populations in urban settings. Forensic techniques can also guide conservation efforts by evaluating the environmental effects of urbanization on insect populations.

=== Stored-product ===
Stored-product forensic entomology is often used in litigation over insect infestation or contamination of commercially distributed foods, including grains, flour, and packaged meals. Stored-product forensic entomologists may be asked to identify the species involved, evaluate the extent of an infestation, and pinpoint the infestation's source in a legal proceeding. They might also offer expert testimony about the circumstances that gave rise to the infestation and suggest safeguards to prevent similar risks in the future.

In general, forensic entomology of stored products adds both critical evidence to legal evaluation and contributes to overall food safety and quality assurances; forensic entomologists work to guarantee that food products are safe for consumption by identifying insect species and tracking their presence in stored goods. Additionally, this sector contributes to the general enhancement of food business practices by researching and developing novel techniques for pest management and product preservation.

=== Medico-legal ===
Medico-legal forensic entomology involves the study of arthropods found at the scene of various incidents such as murder, suicide, rape, physical abuse, and the smuggling of contraband. This discipline provides the techniques to associate the victim(s), suspect(s), and scene together by identifying different arthropod species found in specific geographical locations. Forensic investigators can learn important details from insect activities, including the length of time passed since death (PMI), the presence of substances ― medicative or toxic ― in the body, and the movement or disturbance of the body following death. In murder investigations, forensic entomologists analyze the species of eggs which appear on the cadaver, their location on the body, and their development stage to determine the PMI and the location of death. The presence of specific insect species, which may be endemic (occurring only in certain places) or a well-defined phenology (active only at a certain season, or time of day). In association with other evidence, these can provide crucial links to times and locations where the criminal acts have occurred. Entomology can also aid when determining the time of an injury. One determining factor might be the observed species' preference of alimentation; when blowfly eggs laid on a hatch into the first larval instar (life stage), they require a liquid protein meal. Due to their minute size and fragility blowflies are unable to break through human skin themselves to attain this nutrition. Therefore, the female typically oviposits near a pre-existing wound or natural orifices to provide an accessible meal to her brood, such as blood, mucous, or other body fluids.

Another area covered by medico-legal forensic entomology is the relatively new field of entomotoxicology. This particular branch involves the testing of entomological specimens found at a scene for different drugs that may have possibly played a role in the death of the victim. The analytical perspective behind these methods relies upon the fact that the presence of drugs within the cadaver specifically affects the growth and morphology of the insects ingesting those toxins from the corpse. Due to these alterations, the presence of drugs can potentially lead to an erroneous PMI when basing it on the abnormal physical development of insects who have fed on them.

==== Myiasis ====
Myiasis, the infestation of living vertebrate animals with certain species of dipteran larvae (ex: blowfly maggots), is a phenomenon that may be noted in cases of abandonment or neglect. This condition occurs when flies colonize a living human or animal, feeding on the organism's accessible living tissues, ingesting food or bodily fluids. In a forensic context, myasis can be confusing, as it may indicate the time of neglect or injury rather than PMI if the remains were colonized when alive. This highlights the importance of careful interpretation of all evidence in forensic investigation.

== History ==
Historically, several accounts of applications have been for, and experimentation with, forensic entomology. Along with an initial case report in China from the 13th century, the primitive observation and correlation between arthropods and forensic contexts has been documented in Germany and France. This observation was conducted during a mass exhumation in the late 1880s by Hofmann and Reinhard. However, only in the last 30 years has forensic entomology been systematically explored as a feasible source for evidence in criminal investigations. Through documented experiments and focus on arthropods and death, the works of Sung Tzu, Francesco Redi, Bergeret d'Arbois, Jean Pierre Mégnin and the physiologist Hermann Reinhard form the foundations for today's modern forensic entomology.

Over time, the study of forensic entomology evolved from an esoteric science reserved only for entomologists and forensic scientists. Early twentieth-century popular scientific literature began to pique a broader interest in entomology. The very popular ten-volume book series, Alfred Brehem's Thierleben (Life of Animals, 1876–1879) expounded on many zoological topics, including the biology of arthropods. The accessible writing style of French entomologist Jean-Henri Fabre was also instrumental to the popularization of entomology. His collection of writings Souvenirs Entomologique, written during the last half of the 19th century, is especially useful because of the meticulous attention to detail to the observed insects' behaviors and life cycles.

=== Song Ci ===
Song Ci (sometimes called Sung Tzu) was a Song dynasty-era (960–1279) judicial intendant and polymath writer who lived in China from 1188 to 1251 AD. He wrote a book titled Washing Away of Wrongs/Collected Cases of Injustice Rectified in 1247 AD, which was intended as a handbook for criminal investigators and coroners so that they may assess a crime scene effectively; it subsequently became the earliest recorded account of someone using forensic entomology for judicial means. Here he depicts several cases in which he took notes on how a person died and determining the probable cause. He also explains in detail how to examine a corpse before and after burial. The level of detail in his explanations of all his cases laid down the fundamentals for modern forensic entomologists. In one murder case dated 1235, a villager was stabbed to death and authorities determined that his wounds were inflicted by a sickle, a tool used for cutting rice at harvest time, a fact which led them to suspect a fellow peasant worker was involved. The local magistrate had the villagers assemble in the town square, where they would temporarily relinquish their sickles. Within minutes, a swarm of blow flies gathered around one sickle and no others, attracted to traces of blood unseen by the naked eye. It became apparent to all that the owner of that sickle was the culprit, the latter pleading for mercy as authorities detained him.

=== Francesco Redi ===
In 1668, Italian physician Francesco Redi disproved the theory of spontaneous generation, which was the accepted theory of Redi's day; it claimed that maggots developed spontaneously (without any visible cause) from rotting meat. In an experiment, Redi used samples of rotting meat that were either fully exposed to the air, partially exposed to the air, or isolated from the air. Redi showed that both fully and partially exposed rotting meat bore maggots whereas rotting meat not exposed to air did not develop maggots; this discovery completely changed how people viewed the process of decomposition and prompted further investigations into insect life cycles and entomology in general.

=== Bergeret d'Arbois ===
Dr. Louis François Etienne Bergeret (1814–1893) was a French physician and was the first to apply forensic entomology to a case. In a case report published in 1855, he stated a general life cycle for insects and made many assumptions about their mating habits. Nevertheless, these assumptions led him to the first application of forensic entomology in an estimation of post-mortem interval (PMI). His report used forensic entomology as a tool to prove his hypothesis on how and when the person had died.

=== Hermann Reinhard ===
The first systematic study in forensic entomology was conducted in 1881 by German doctor Hermann Reinhard. He exhumed many bodies and demonstrated that the development of many different insect species could be tied to buried bodies. Reinhard conducted his first study in Eastern Germany and collected many Phorid flies there. He concluded that the development of some, but not all species, of insects were associated directly with decaying flesh since there were 15-year-old beetles who had little direct contact with the bodies. Reinhard's works and studies were used extensively in further forensic entomology studies.

=== Jean Pierre Mégnin ===
French veterinarian and entomologist Jean Pierre Mégnin (1828–1905) published many articles and books on various subjects, including the books Faune des Tombeaux and La Faune des Cadavres("The Fauna of Tombs (1887)" and "The Fauna of Cadavers (1894)", respectively), which are considered to be among the most important forensic entomology books in history. Mégnin made many great discoveries that helped shed new light on many of the general characteristics of decaying flora and fauna; the second book in particular contained revolutionary work on the theory of "predictable waves", the process of insect succession on corpses: he asserted that exposed corpses were subject to eight successional waves, whereas buried corpses were only subject to two waves. In one case, he was able to estimate how long an infant had been dead for (PMI) by counting the numbers of live and dead mites every 15 days, and comparing the data with his initial count. His study of the larval and adult forms of insect families found in cadavers sparked the interest of future entomologists and encouraged more research in the link between arthropods and the deceased, and thereby helped to establish the scientific discipline of forensic entomology. It was after the publication of Mégnin's work that the studies of forensic science and entomology became an established part of Western popular culture, which in turn inspired other Western scientists to continue and expand upon his research.

== Postmortem interval estimation ==
In forensic entomology cases, the decomposition of insects is studied to determine a body's time of death.

A crucial component of forensic entomology is the calculation of the postmortem interval (PMI), which mostly depends on the observation of the insect activity on a corpse. Using the life stages of insects discovered on or near a body, forensic entomologists can reasonably determine how long it has been since a person died.

The pace of insect colonization and development is influenced by a number of variables, and can be difficult to predict and interpret without the use of mathematical models. To be able to quantify this, forensic entomologists will use thermal summation models such as accumulated degree days (ADD) and/or accumulated degree hours (ADH). These methods calculate the total amount of heat energy required for an insect to reach a specific developmental milestone. While ADH provides a more granular hourly breakdown, ADD measures the heat units accumulated over 24 hour periods, representing the so-called "thermal budget" available for growth since the time of death.

Even through PMI estimation based on insect evidence is typically accurate, it is crucial to take into account additional elements; including body position, ambient circumstances and insect behavior that may impact colonization patterns and developmental rates around and on the target subject of insect activity.

=== Factors Affecting Insect Development ===
==== Moisture levels ====
Both the decomposition and insect activity on a corpse are significantly influenced by humidity. Elevated humidity can hasten the decomposition process by fostering microbial proliferation, which facilitates the breakdown of tissues. Additionally the odors and gases produced by this microbial activity draw insects to the body. These smells are particularly attractive to insects like blowflies and flesh flies, which may quickly populate a body in humid conditions.

Low humidity, on the other hand, can impede the breakdown process. Mummification rather that breakdown may result from the body losing moisture more quickly in arid settings. Given that many insects need damp atmosphere to survive, this may discourage their activity. Nonetheless, some insects, like dermestid beetles, can survive in dry environments and can still be found on a body.

The existence of standing water next to a body can also affect the activity of insects. Aquatic insects, such as water beetles and some fly species, may be drawn to bodies near water sources. These insects can colonize the body and hasten its decomposition. Furthermore, because different insect species have distinct preference for habitats, the presence of water might influence the kinds of insects that inhabits the body.

To estimate the postmortem period and reconstruct the circumstances around a death, forensic entomologists are required to have an understanding of how humidity levels can affect decomposition.

===== Submersion =====
M. Lee Goff, a noted and well respected forensic entomologist, was assigned to a case involving the discovery of a decomposing body found on a boat half a mile from shore. Upon collection of the maggot mass, only one insect, Chrysomya megacephala, was discovered. He concluded that the water barrier accounted for the scarcity of other flies. He also noted that flies will not attempt to trek across large bodies of water unless there is a substantially influential attractant.

In addition, the amount of time a maggot mass has been exposed to salt water can affect its development. From the cases Goff observed he found that if subjected for more than 30 minutes, there was a 24‑hour developmental delay. Not many more studies have been conducted and thus a specific amount of delay time is difficult to estimate.

The main focus of a study accomplished by Payne and King using fetal pigs, was the insect succession regarding carcass decomposition in an aquatic setting. Their results concluded that in the early floating stages of the cadaver, eggs were laid by blowflies. Moreover, by the bloating stage, most of the exposed flesh was absent and maggots migrated from the body. Many of the latter were present below the water line and fed on the carcass; with only their Spiracle (arthropods) protruding the surface.

==== Sun exposure ====
"Because insects are cold-blooded animals, their rate of development is more or less dependent on ambient temperature." Bodies exposed to large amounts of sunlight will heat up, giving the insects a warmer area to develop, reducing their development time. An experiment conducted by Bernard Greenberg and John Charles Kunich with the use of rabbit carcasses to study accumulation of degree days found that with temperature ranging in the mid 70s to high 80s the amount of developmental time for maggots was significantly reduced.

In contrast, bodies found in shaded areas will be cooler, and insects will require longer growth periods. In addition, if temperatures reach extreme levels of cold, insects instinctively know to prolong their development time in order to hatch into a more accepting and viable climate in order to increase the chance of survival and reproduction.

Furthermore, insect activity and colonization patterns can also be influenced by the length and intensity of solar exposure. Because the increasing temperature speeds up their development, insects are more likely to be active and colonize a body more quickly in places exposed to direct and extended sunlight. In comparison to shaded locations, this may result in a quicker succession of insect life and disintegration stages. On the other hand, because of the lower temperatures, shaded areas might have slower rates of insect activity and decomposition, which would delay the processes of insect colonization and decomposition.

==== Air exposure ====
Air exposure can have a significant impact on insects and the determination of postmortem interval (PMI). Hanged bodies can be expected to show their own quantity and variety of flies. Also, the amount of time flies will stay on a hanged body will vary in comparison to one found on the ground. A hanged body is more exposed to air and thus will dry out faster, leaving less food source for the maggots.

The presence and behavior of insects on hanging bodies can vary. As the body begins to decompose, a compilation of fluids will leak to the ground. This area is where most of the expected fauna can be found. Also, it is more likely that rove beetles and other non-flying insects will be found here instead of directly on the body. Fly maggots, initially deposited on the body, may also be found below.

==== Geography ====
According to Jean Pierre Mégnin's book La Faune des Cadavres there are eight distinct faunal successions attracted to a corpse. While most beetles and flies of forensic importance can be found worldwide, a portion of them are limited to a specific range of habitats. It is forensically important to know the geographical distribution of these insects in order to determine information such as post mortem interval or whether a body has been moved from its original place of death.

Calliphoridae is arguably the most important family concerning forensic entomology given that they are the first to arrive on the corpse. The family can be found worldwide. Chrysomya rufifaces, the hairy maggot blow fly, is a forensically important member of the family Calliphoridae and is widespread, however it is not prevalent in the Southern California, Arizona, New Mexico, Louisiana, Florida, or Illinois regions.

Flesh flies fall under the family Sacrophagidae and generally arrive at a corpse following Calliphoridae. Unlike Calliphoridae, however, members of this family are able to fly in heavy rain. This key advantage enables them to occasionally reach a body before Calliphoridae, affecting the maggot mass that will be discovered. Flesh flies are globally distributed including habitats in the United States, Europe, Asia, and the Middle East.

Beetles are representative of the order Coleoptera which accounts for the largest of the insect orders. Beetles are very adaptive and can be found in almost all environments with the exception of Antarctica and high mountainous regions. The most diverse beetle fauna can be found in the tropics. In addition, beetles are less submissive to temperatures. Thus, if a carcass has been found in cold temperatures, the beetle will be prevalent over Calliphoridae.

==== Weather ====
Various weather conditions in a given amount of time cause certain pests to invade human households. This is because the insects are in search of food, water, and shelter. Damp weather causes reproduction and growth enhancement in many insect types, especially when coupled with warm temperatures. Most pests concerned at this time are ants, spiders, crickets, cockroaches, ladybugs, yellowjackets, hornets, mice, and rats. When conditions are dry, the deprivation of moisture outside drives many pests inside searching for water. While the rainy weather increases the numbers of insects, this dry weather causes pest invasions to increase. The pests most commonly known during dry conditions are scorpions, ants, pillbugs, millipedes, crickets, and spiders. Extreme drought does kill many populations of insects, but also drives surviving insects to invade more often. Cold temperatures outside will cause invasions beginning in the late summer months and early fall. Box elder bugs, cluster flies, ladybugs, and silverfish are noticed some of the most common insects to seek the warm indoors. In general, insects are poikilothermic animals; thus meaning their level of activity is substantially depended upon their surrounding environmental conditions. An increase in the temperature will result in an accelerated metabolism of the insect; hence resulting in an increased activity.

== Arthropods in decomposition ==
The activities of insects and other arthropods within a carcass are essential to decomposition; the breakdown of organic materials including human remains. Chemicals emitted during decomposition attract necrophagous insects, those that feed on dead creatures. These insects hasten the decomposition process by aiding in the breakdown of bodily tissues. Many species have been recorded on cadavers, and they are covered below.

=== Insect succession ===
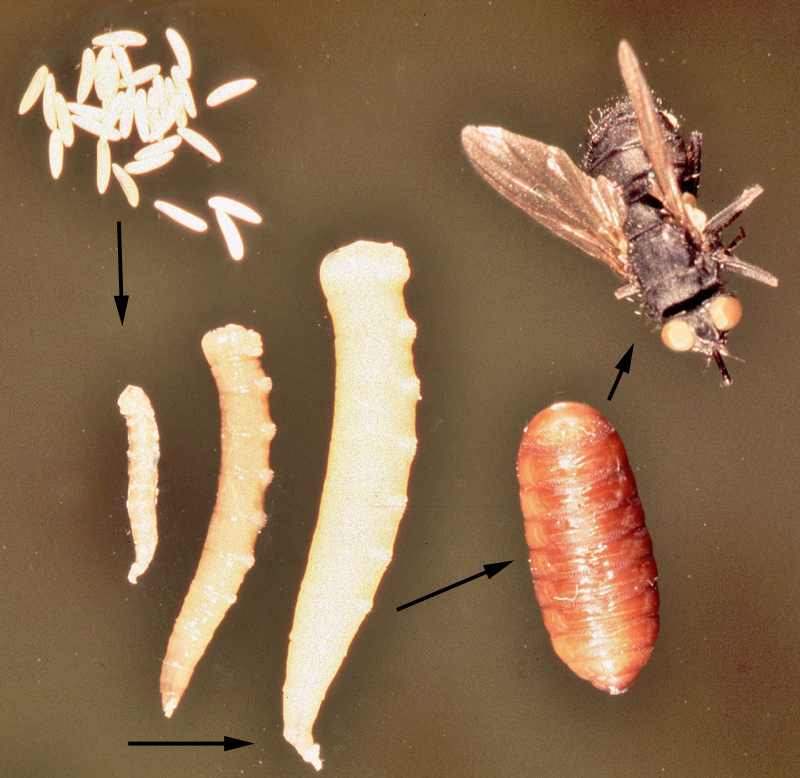
Life cycle of a fly

Insect succession, as utilized in forensic entomology, refers to the orderly progression of insect colonization and decomposition processes on a corpse over time. Their life cycle typically consists of four stages : eggs, larval, pupal, and adult. Each stage has unique eating behavior that changes as the organism breaks down. In forensic investigations, the presence and developmental phases of insects can provide important data for understanding environmental circumstances, body movement, and postmortem interval (PMI) estimation. In forensic entomology, insects play a crucial role as indicators, helping to identify key components of a death investigation due to their distinct ecological responsibilities and varied geographic distribution. Given that different insect species inhabit a body in a certain order, understanding insect succession is essential for predicting the postmortem interval (PMI). Typically, insect succession occurs in the following stages:

1. Fresh stage: Marked by the arrival of necrophagous insects attracted to the body by chemicals, such as flesh flies and blowflies. These insects deposit their eggs (oviposit) on or near to the body, and the decaying tissues are the maggot's food source.
2. Bloated stage: The body starts to swell as a result of gas buildup during the breakdown process. During this phase, insects such as cheese skipper and coffin flies become more common.
3. Decay stage: In this stage, the insect community changes as the body goes through a more advanced state of decomposition. Predatory insects and mites increase in number, as do beetles, such as dermestid beetles and rove beetles.
4. Dry stage: The body dries up and the skeletal remains become visible during the last phases of decomposition. Scavenger insects and animals may be present on the remains, along with insects like ham beetles and hide beetles.

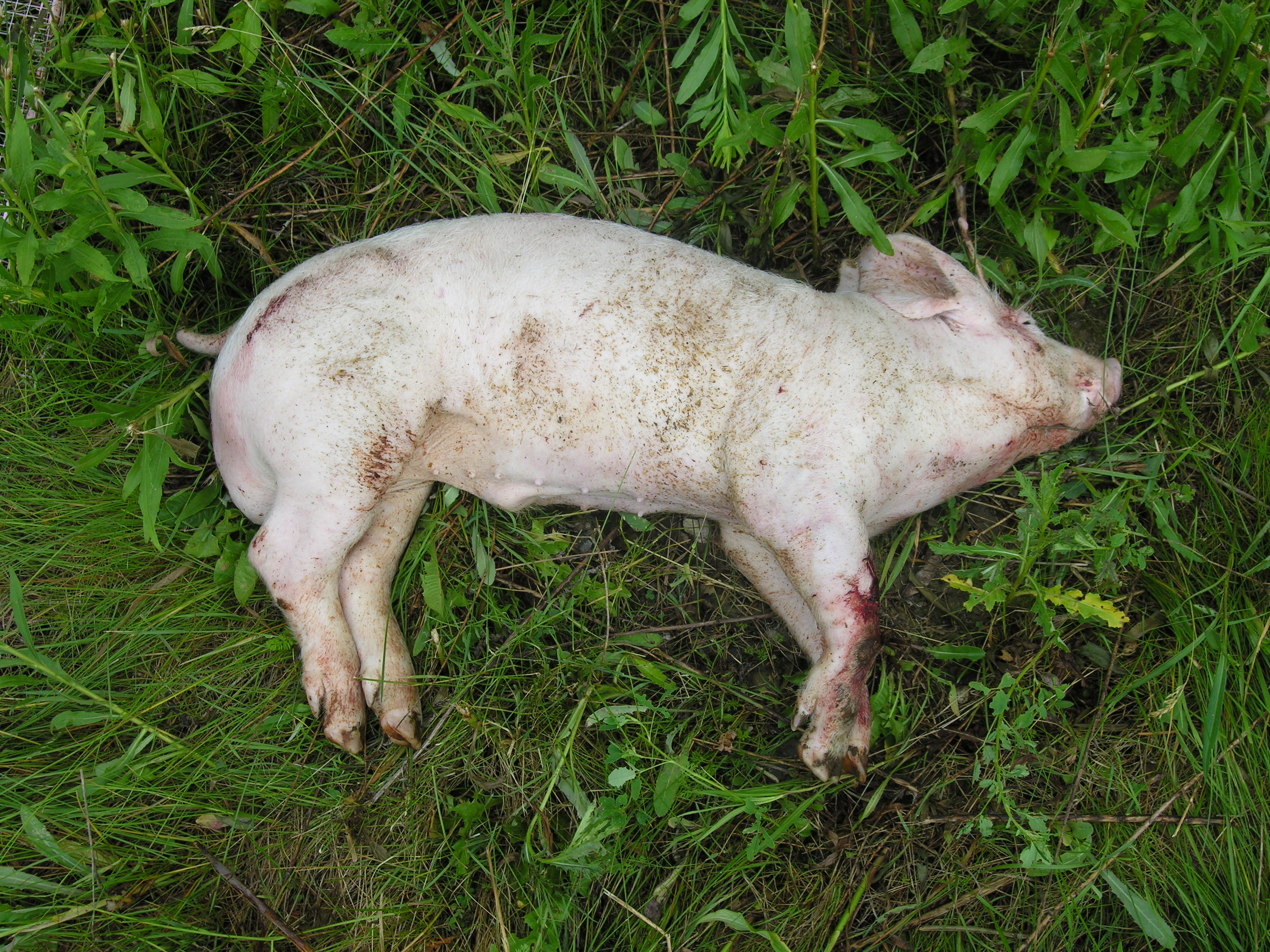
Fresh stage

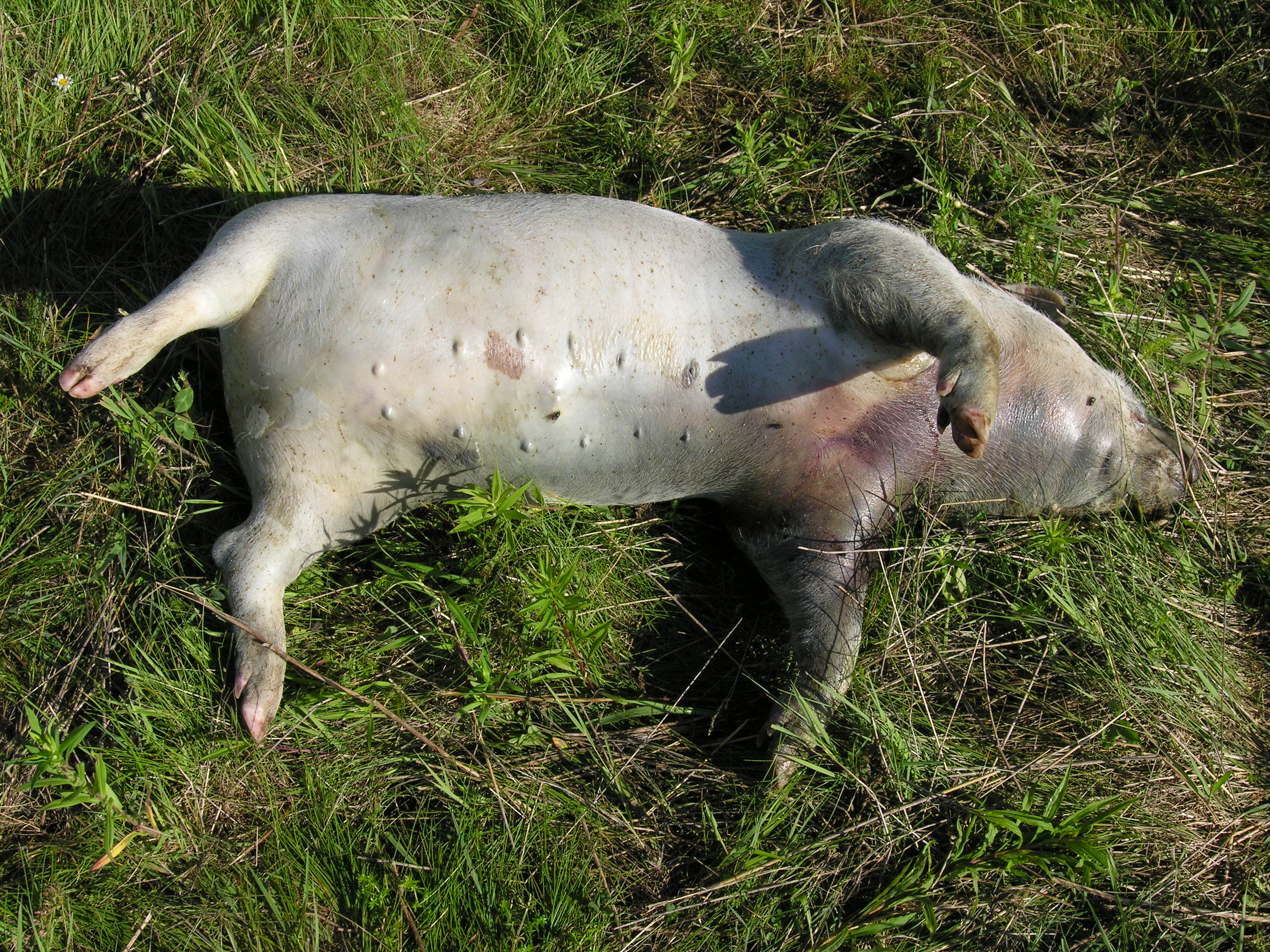
Bloat stage

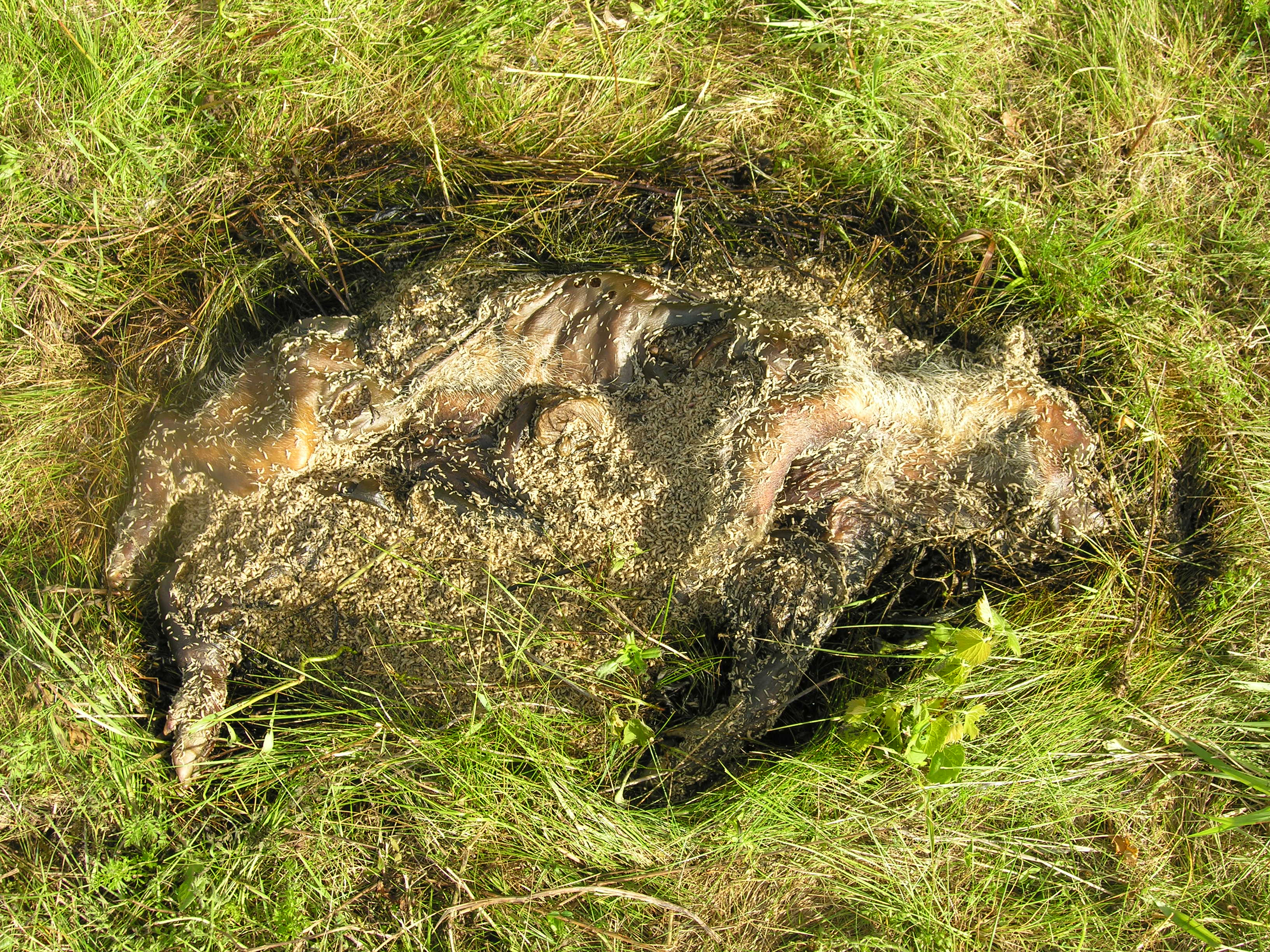
Decay stage

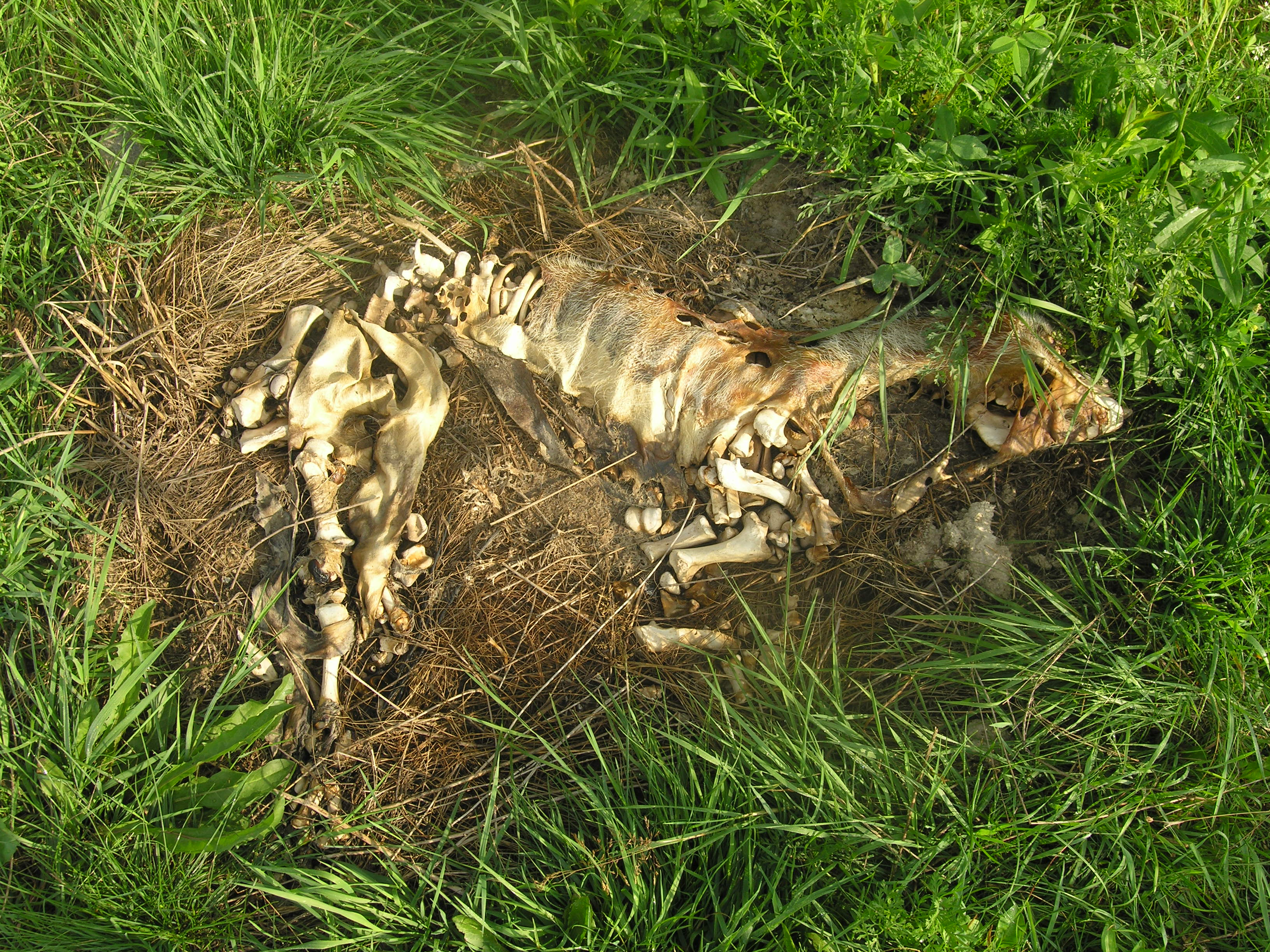
Dry stage

Decompositional stages of a pig carcass

=== Invertebrate types ===
==== Scorpionflies ====
Scorpionflies (order Mecoptera) were the first insects to arrive at a donated human cadaver observed (by the entomologist Natalie Lindgren) at the Southeast Texas Applied Forensic Science Facility near Huntsville, Texas, and remained on the corpse for one and a half days, outnumbering flies during that period. A great presence of scorpionflies may indicate shorter postmortem intervals.

==== Flies ====
Flies from the order Diptera are very often found at a crime scene, because they are attracted to the odoriferous chemicals released by decomposing bodies, known as volatile organic compounds (VOCs). A dead body is a perfect ovipositional environment for flies, as the developing maggots will have an abundant and ready food source. Different types of flies can be found on dead bodies, the most significant of which are:

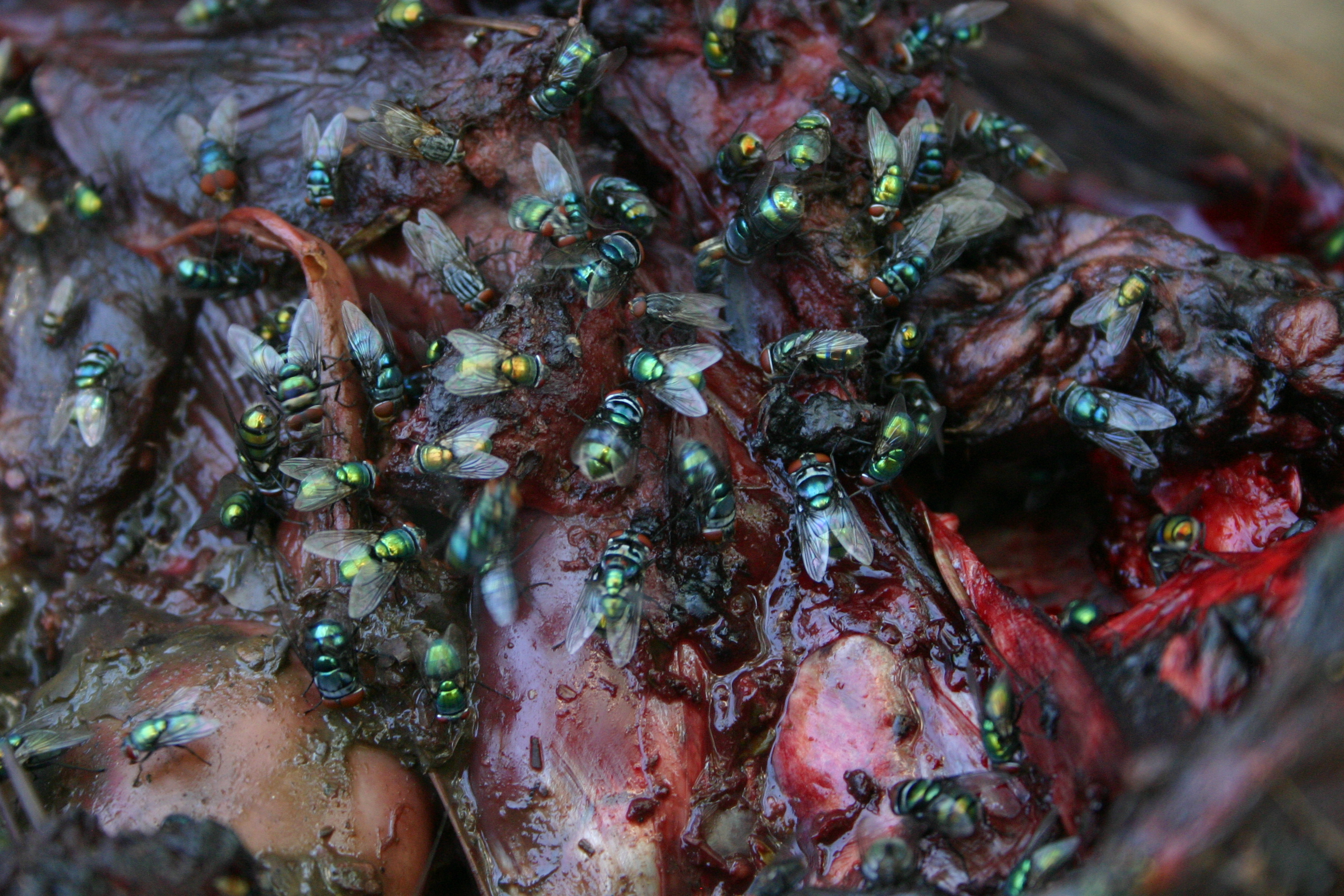
Blowflies on a fresh cape porcupine

- Blow flies (Calliphoridae): Flies in this family are often metallic in appearance and between 10 and 14 mm in length. In addition to the name blow-fly, some members of this family are known as blue bottle fly, cluster flies, greenbottles, or black blowfly. A characteristic of the blow-fly is its 3-segmented antennae. Hatching from an egg to the first larval stage takes from eight hours to one day. Larvae have three stages of development (called instars); each stage is separated by a molting event, where they shed their old skin to grow. The larvae's ideal habitat in regard to pupation are locations providing access to loose, damp soil and litter, with favorable temperatures. Worldwide, there are 1100 known species of blowflies, with 228 species in the Neotropics, and a large number of species in Africa and Southern Europe. The most common area to find Calliphoridae species are in the countries of India, Japan, Central America, and in the southern United States. These flies' forensic importance is due to them being among the first insect to come in contact with carrion because they have the ability to smell death from up to ten miles (16 km) away. Some prominent species of Calliphoridae are Calliphora vomitoria and Calliphora vicina.

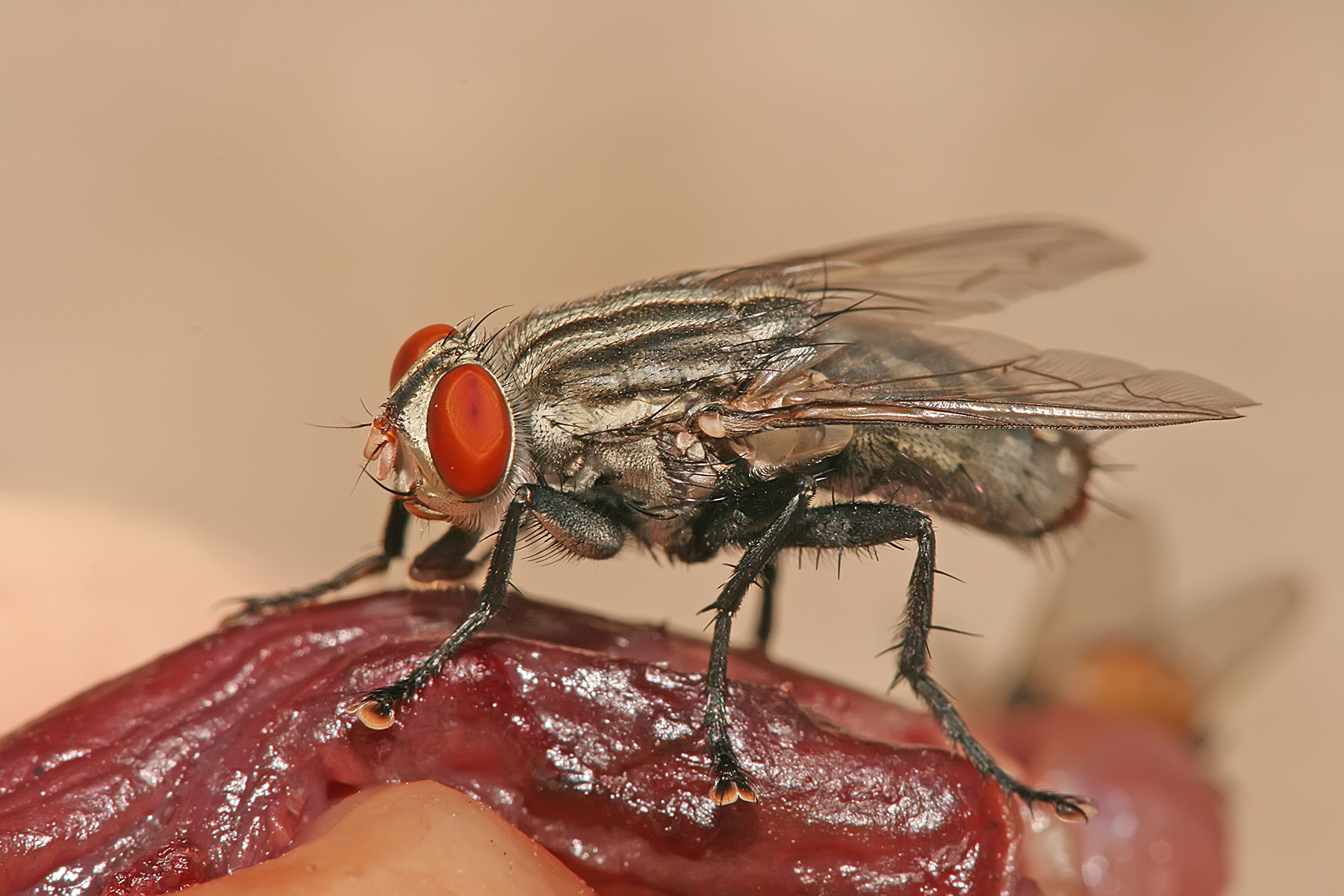
Flesh fly on decomposing flesh

- Flesh flies (Sarcophagidae): Most flesh flies breed in carrion, feces, garbage, and other decaying material, but a few species lay their eggs in the open wounds of mammals, hence their common name. Characteristics of the flesh-fly is its 3-segmented antennae. Most holarctic Sarcophagidae vary in size from 4 to 18 mm in length (tropical species can be larger) with black and gray longitudinal stripes on the thorax and checkering on the abdomen. Flesh-flies are viviparous, frequently giving birth to live young on dead humans and other animals at any stage of decomposition, from newly dead through to bloated or decaying (though the latter is more common). Sarcophaga barbata are specifically useful since they deposit maggots directly onto the decomposing body, their larger, visible size, and difference in activity during different stages. Their main limitation, however, is due to lack of information surrounding their geographic distribution and taxonomic features.

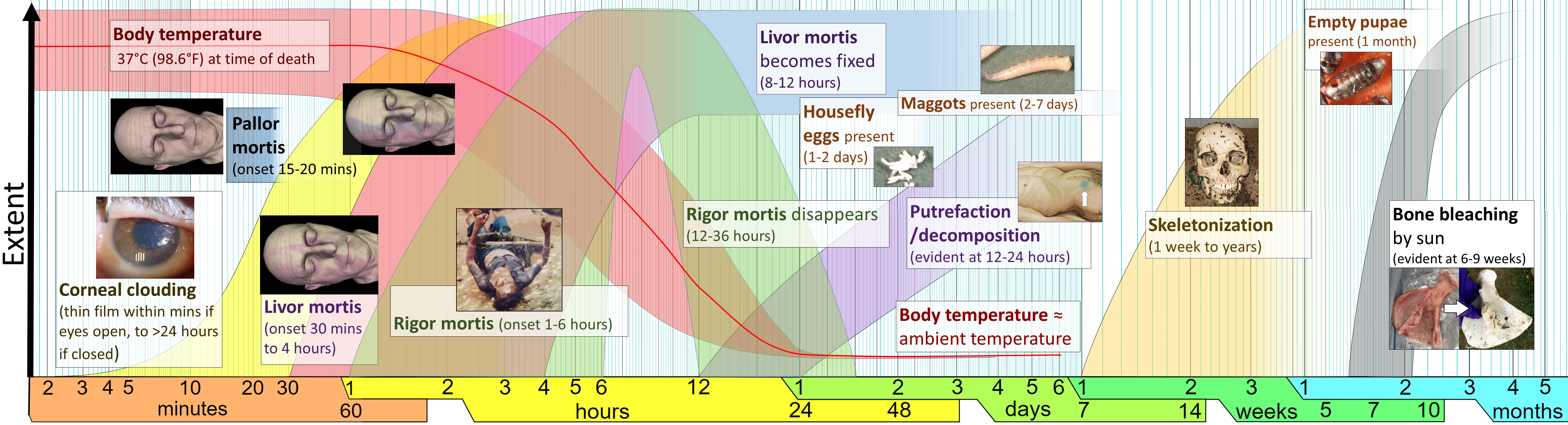
Timeline of postmortem changes (stages of death), including house fly eggs, larvae and pupae

- House flies (Muscidae): One of the most common of all flies found in homes, and indeed one of the most widely distributed insects; it is often considered a pest that can carry serious diseases. The adults are 6–9 mm long. Their thorax is gray, with four longitudinal dark lines on the back. The underside of their abdomen is yellow, and their whole body is covered with hair. Each female fly can lay up to 500 eggs in several batches of about 75 to 150 eggs. Genus Hydrotaea are of particular forensic importance.
- Cheese flies (Piophilidae): Most are scavengers of animal products and fungi. The best-known member of the family is Piophila casei; it is a small fly, about four mm (1/6 inch) long, found worldwide, and is sometimes called the cheese skipper for its leaping ability. The adult fly's body is black, blue-black, or bronze, with some yellow on the head, antennae, and legs. The wings are faintly iridescent and lie flat upon the fly's abdomen when at rest. At four mm (1/6 inch) long, the fly is one-third to one-half as long as the common housefly. Its larvae infests cured meats, smoked fish, cheeses, and decaying animals. Forensic entomology uses the presence of Piophila casei larvae to help estimate the date of death for human remains, as they do not take up residence in a corpse until three to six months after death.
- Coffin flies (Phoridae): aka Humpbacked flies. The larvae feed on decaying bodies, thus they are important in buried bodies. Some species can burrow to a depth of 50 cm over 4 days.
- Lesser corpse flies (Sphaeroceridae)
- Lesser house flies (Fanniidae)
- Black scavenger flies (Sepsidae)
- Sun flies (Heleomyzidae)
- Soldier flies (Stratiomyidae): These flies have potential for use in forensic entomology. The larvae of some species (Hermetia illucens, the black soldier fly) are common scavengers in compost heaps, are found in association with carrion, can be destructive pests in beehives, and are used in manure management (for both house fly control and reduction in manure volume). The larvae range in size from 1/8 to 3/4 of an inch (3 to 19 millimeters). The adult fly is a mimic, very close in size, color, and appearance to the organ pipe mud dauber wasp and its relatives.
- Non-biting midges (Chironomidae): These flies have a complex life cycle. While adults are terrestrial and phytophagous, larvae are aquatic and detritivorous. Immature instars have been used as forensic markers in several cases where submerged corpses were found.

==== Beetles ====
Beetles (Order Coleoptera) are generally found in later stages of decomposition. They play a role in breaking down the remaining soft tissue and are important in the final stages of decomposition. In drier conditions, the beetles can be replaced by moth flies (Psychodidae). Their life cycle normally consists of four stages : eggs, larval, pupal, and adult. Each stage has unique eating behavior that changes as the organism breaks down. In forensic investigations, the existence and developmental phases of insects can yield important data for understanding environmental circumstances, body movement, and PMI estimation. In forensic entomology, insects play a crucial function as indicators, helping to identify vital components of a death investigation due to their distinct ecological responsibilities and varied geographic distribution. Different types of beetles can be found on dead bodies the most significant include:

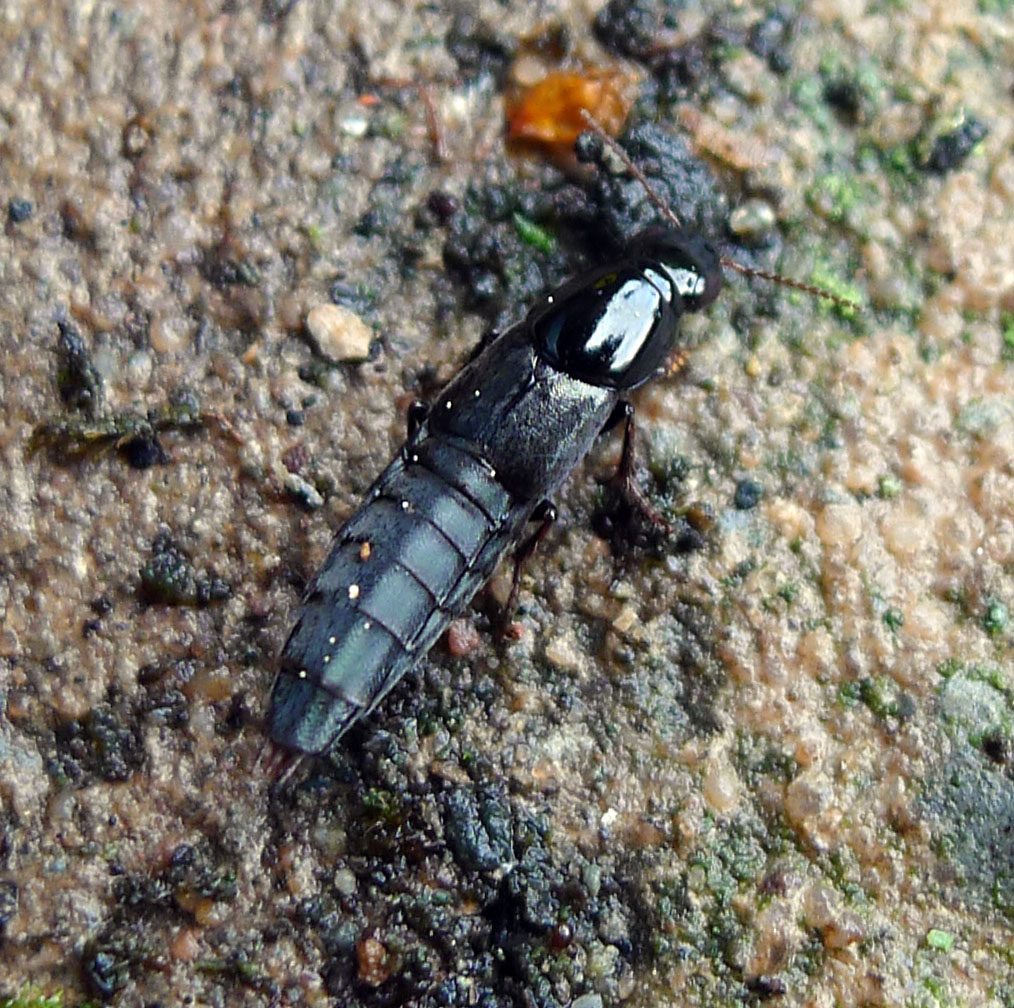
Rove Beetle

- Rove beetles (Staphylinidae): Elongate beetles with small elytra (wing covers) and large jaws. Rove beetles have a four-stage life cycle; egg, larvae, pupa and adult. Creophilus species are common predators of carrion, and since they are large, are a very visible component of the fauna of corpses. Some adult Staphylinidae are early visitors to a corpse, feeding on larvae of all species of fly, including the later predatory fly larvae. They lay their eggs in the corpse, and the emerging larvae are also predators. Some species have a long development time in the egg, and are common only during the later stages of decomposition. Staphylinids can also tear open the pupal cases of flies, to sustain themselves at a corpse for long periods.
- Hister beetles (Histeridae): Adult histerids are usually shiny beetles (black or metallic-green) which have an introverted head. The carrion-feeding species only become active at night when they enter the maggot-infested part of the corpse to capture and devour their maggot prey. During daylight they hide under the corpse unless it is sufficiently decayed to enable them to hide inside it. They have fast larval development with only two larval stages. Among the first beetles to arrive at a corpse are Histeridae of the genus Saprinus. Saprinus adults feed on both the larvae and pupae of blowflies, although some have a preference for fresh pupae. The adults lay their eggs in the corpse, inhabiting it in the later stages of decay.
- Carrion beetles (Silphidae): Adult Silphidae have an average size of about 12 mm. They are also referred to as burying beetles because they dig and bury small carcasses underground. Both parents tend to their young and exhibit communal breeding. The male carrion beetle's job in care is to provide protection for the breed and carcass from competitors. Necrodes littoralis is a type of carrion beetle in the Silphidae family that prefers to inhabit bodies that are outdoors and in the later stages of decomposition. Modeling the activity and behaviors of carrion beetles like N. littoralis and other carrion beetles that inhabit bodies earlier in death is a helpful tool to map time of death.
- Ham beetles (Cleridae)
- Carcass beetles (Trogidae)
- Skin/hide beetles (Dermestidae): Hide beetles are important in the final stages of decomposition of a carcass. The adults and larvae feed on the dried skin, tendons, and cartilage left by fly larvae. Hide beetles are the only beetle with the enzymes necessary for breaking down keratin, a protein component of hair and nails.
- Scarab beetles (Scarabaeidae): Scarab beetles may be any one of around 30,000 beetle species worldwide that are compact, heavy-bodied and oval in shape. The flattened plates, which each antenna terminates, are fitted together to form a club. The outer edges of the front legs may also be toothed or scalloped. Scarab beetles range from 0.2 to 4.8 in (5.1 to 121.9 mm) in length. These species are known for being one of the heaviest insect species.
- Sap beetles (Nitidulidae)

==== Mites ====
Many mites (Acari, which are arachnids) feed on corpses, with Macrocheles mites common in the early stages of decomposition, while Tyroglyphidae and Oribatid mites such as Rostrozetes feed on dry skin in the later stages of decomposition.

Nicrophorus beetles (which are Silphids) often carry the mite Poecilochirus upon their bodies; these feed on fly eggs. If they arrive at the corpse before any fly eggs hatch into maggots, the first eggs are eaten and maggot development is delayed. This may lead to incorrect PMI estimates. Nicrophorus beetles find the ammonia excretions of blowfly maggots toxic, and the Poecilochirus mites, by keeping the maggot population low, allow Nicrophorus to occupy and dominate the corpse.

==== Moths ====
Moths (order Lepidoptera) such as clothes-moths (Tineidae) – are closely related to butterflies. Most species of moth are nocturnal, but there are crepuscular and diurnal species. During their larval stages, clothes moths tend to feed on mammalian hair. They are amongst the final animals contributing to the decomposition of a corpse. This said, adult moths lay their legs on a carcass subsequently to fly larvae having had their presence on it.

==== Wasps, ants, and bees ====
Wasps, ants, and bees (order Hymenoptera) are not necessarily necrophagous and are rather considered omnivorous, incidental species. While some feed on the body, some are also predatory, eating the insects feeding on the body. Parasitoids such as parasitoid wasps lay their eggs within the eggs or pupae of other insects, oftentimes only on those of specific host species, and eventually kills their host. A relevant type of parasitoid are the Pteromalidae, which oviposit only upon the pupae of muscoid flies. The wasp larvae will feed on the fly developing within the puparium, eventually killing it. Bees and wasps have been seen feeding on bodies during the early stages. This may cause problems for murder cases in which larval flies are used to estimate the PMI since eggs and larvae on the body may have been consumed prior to the arrival on scene of investigators.

== Modern techniques ==
Many new techniques have been developed and are used in order to more accurately gather evidence, or reevaluate old information. The use of these newly developed techniques and evaluations have become relevant in litigation and appeals. Forensic entomology not only uses arthropod biology, but it pulls from other sciences, introducing fields like chemistry and genetics, exploiting their inherent synergy through the use of DNA in forensic entomology. In order to improve the precision and dependability of insect-based evidence analysis, forensic entomologists nowadays use a variety of cutting-edge technologies, such as stable isotope analysis and DNA analysis. These methods have broadened the field of forensic entomology by making it possible to identify insect species more precisely, pinpoint their geographic origins, and draw important conclusions about the circumstances surrounding a death. Some of the most important contemporary forensic entomology techniques are examined in this section along with how they are applied to criminal investigations.

=== Scanning electron microscopy ===
Fly larvae and fly eggs are used to aid in the determination of a PMI. In order for the data to be useful the larvae and eggs must be identified down to a species level to get an accurate estimate for the PMI. There are many techniques currently being developed to differentiate between the various species of forensically important insects. A study in 2007 demonstrates a technique that can use scanning electron microscopy (SEM) to identify key morphological features of eggs and maggots. Some of the morphological differences that can help identify the different species are the presence/absence of anastomosis, the presence/absence of anterior and posterior spiracles, the cephalopharyngeal skeleton as well as the shape and length of the median area.

The SEM method provides an array of morphological features for use in identifying fly eggs; however, this method does have some disadvantages. The main disadvantage is that it requires expensive equipment and can take time to identify the species from which the egg originated, so it may not be useful in a field study or to quickly identify a particular egg. The SEM method is effective provided there is ample time and the proper equipment and the particular fly eggs are plentiful. The ability to use these morphological differences gives forensic entomologists a powerful tool that can help with estimating a post mortem interval, along with other relevant information, such as whether the body has been disturbed post mortem.

=== Potassium permanganate staining ===
When scanning electron microscopy is not available, a faster, lower cost technique is potassium permanganate staining. The collected eggs are rinsed with a normal saline solution and placed in a glass petri dish. The eggs are soaked in a 1% potassium permanganate solution for one minute and then dehydrated and mounted onto a slide for observation. These slides can be used with any light microscope with a calibrated eyepiece to compare various morphological features. The most important and useful features for identifying eggs are the size, length, and width of the plastron, as well as the morphology of the plastron in the area around the micropyle. The various measurements and observations when compared to standards for forensically important species are used to determine the species of the egg.

=== DNA analysis ===
Modern forensic entomology now relies heavily on DNA analysis as a fundamental tool for accurately identifying insect species and gaining important insights into their interactions with human remains. Using this method, DNA is extracted from insect specimens discovered at crime scenes and compared to databases containing known DNA sequences. Forensic entomologists can verify species identification, identify the existence of particular species linked to decomposition, and even establish a connection between insects and particular geographical areas through the examination of insect DNA.

The identification of insect stomach contents is one of the main uses of DNA analysis in forensic entomology. Investigators can ascertain the insect's most recent meal by sequencing the DNA contained in the gut of maggots or other insect larvae discovered on a body. When determining the postmortem interval (PMI) or locating possible sources of contamination or infection, this information might be extremely important.

The study of insect dispersal patterns and colonization behaviour has also been transformed by DNA research. Researchers can deduce patterns of travel and colonization by examining the genetic variety of insect populations. This can provide important insights into the origin of insect specimens found at crime scenes or the transportation of a body.

In general, DNA analysis has improved forensic entomology's accuracy and dependability significantly, allowing investigators to obtain previously unobtainable specific information from insect evidence.

==== Mitochondrial DNA ====
Mitochondrial DNA was introduced into forensic identification in 1993 and has its advantages where nuclear DNA is limited. Analysis of hair, bones, and teeth is a prime example. It's also a logical target for genetic analysis involving necrosed larvae, puparia, or small insect parts. Where a large number of copies and a high mutation rate are present, leading to rapid generations of sequences between families.

In 2001, a method was devised by Jeffrey Wells and Felix Sperling to use mitochondrial DNA to differentiate between different species of the subfamily Chrysomyinae. This is particularly useful when working to determine the identity of specimens that do not have distinctive morphological characteristics at certain life stages.

==== Gene expression studies ====
Although physical characteristics and sizes at various instars have been used to estimate fly age, a more recent study has been conducted to determine the age of an egg based on the expression of particular genes. This is particularly useful in determining developmental stages that are not evidenced by change in size; such as the egg or pupa and where only a general time interval can be estimated based on the duration of the particular developmental stage. This is done by breaking the stages down into smaller units separated by predictable changed in gene expression. Three genes were measured in an experiment with Drosophila melanogaster: bicoid (bcd), slalom (sll), and chitin synthase (cs). These three genes were used because they are likely to be in varied levels during different times of the egg development process. These genes all share a linear relationship in regards to age of the egg; that is, the older the egg is the more of the particular gene is expressed. However, all of the genes are expressed in varying amounts. Different genes on different loci would need to be selected for another fly species. The genes expressions are mapped in a control sample to formulate a developmental chart of the gene expression at certain time intervals. This chart can then be compared to the measured values of gene expression to accurately predict the age of an egg to within two hours with a high confidence level. Even though this technique can be used to estimate the age of an egg, the feasibility and legal acceptance of this must be considered for it to be a widely utilized forensic technique. One benefit of this would be that it is like other DNA-based techniques so most labs would be equipped to conduct similar experiments without requiring new capital investment. This style of age determination is in the process of being used to more accurately find the age of the instars and pupa; however, it is much more complicated, as there are more genes being expressed during these stages. The hope is that with this and other similar techniques a more accurate PMI can be obtained.

=== Mock crime scenes ===
A valuable tool that is becoming very common in the training of forensic entomologists is the use of mock crime scenes using pig carcasses. The pig carcass represents a human body and can be used to illustrate various environmental effects on both arthropod succession and the estimate of the post mortem interval. Pigs are the most frequently utilised model in an attempt to gather data regarding forensic experimental analysis. The latter is highly proportionate to human nature due to our overlapping characteristics with the mentioned species. These interrelated components include: subcutaneous fat stores, skin thickness, range of adult body mass, hair covering, and omnivorous diets.

=== Stable isotope analysis ===
A contemporary method that is being used more and more in forensic entomology to shed light on the ecology and life cycle of insects connected to human remains is stable isotope analysis. Using this technique, the stable isotopic composition of elements found in insect tissues, including carbon, nitrogen, hydrogen, and oxygen, is measured. The environment in which the insect developed, including its diet and place of origin, is reflected in these isotopes.

Stable isotope analysis provides information on the travel of the body or the insect itself, and can be used in forensic investigations to assist identify the geographic origin of insects found on a body. Furthermore, features of the insect's diet, such as whether it consumed organic matter or human remains, can be inferred by stable isotope analysis. This information can be vital to comprehending the insect's function in the decomposition process.

When using traditional methods to identify insect species or estimate age, this methodology has proven quite helpful. Stable isotope analysis contributes to more accurate and thorough forensic studies by improving the precision and depth of forensic entomological investigations by offering a distinct chemical signature that represents the insect's surroundings.

== Insect activity case study ==
A preliminary investigation of insect colonization and succession on remains in New Zealand revealed that coastal habitats, often characterized by higher average temperatures, can significantly accelerate the post active decay stage compared to other environments .

In an open field habitat, the environment had a daily average maximum temperature that was relatively warm. The average rainfall for the first 3 weeks in this environment was a small amount of rain per day. Between 2 and 7 weeks, the body began to start active decay. During this stage, the insect successions started with Calliphora stygia, which lasted until day 27. The larvae of Chrysomya rufifacies were present between weeks 2 and 7. Hydrotaea rostrata, larvae of Lucilia sericata, family Psychodidae, and Sylvicola were found to be present relatively late in the body's decay.

In a coastal sand-dune habitat, the environment had an average daily maximum temperature higher than the other environments. The daily average rainfall was recorded as a medium amount for the first 3 weeks. The post-decay time interval, what significantly shorter than the average interval due to the higher ambient temperatures of the coastal environment. Insects obtained late in the post-active stage include the Calliphora quadrimaculata, adult Sphaeroceridae, Psychodidae and Piophilidae (no larvae from this last family were obtained in recovery).

The native bush environment had recorded daily average maximum and minimum temperatures similar to the open field habitat. The average rainfall in this habitat was recorded to be very low per day. After the bloat stage, which lasted until day seven after death, post-active decay began around 2 weeks. In this habitat, the H. rostrata, adult Phoridae, Sylvicola larvae and adult were the predominant species remaining on the body during the pre-skeletonization stages.

== See also ==
- Forensic entomology and the law
- Insect indicators of abuse or neglect
