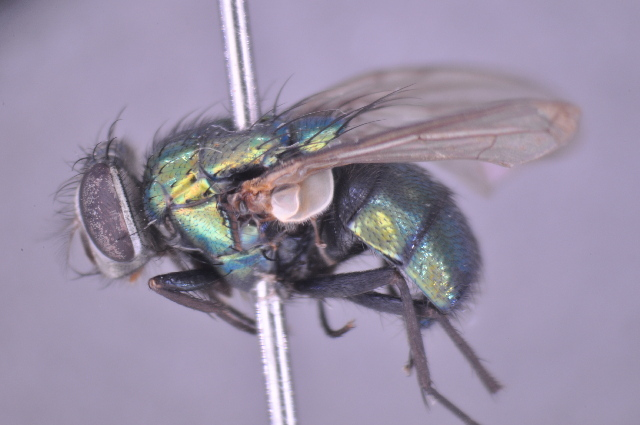

Scientific classification
- Kingdom: Animalia
- Phylum: Arthropoda
- Class: Insecta
- Order: Diptera
- Family: Calliphoridae
- Genus: Lucilia
- Species: L. coeruleiviridis

Binomial name
- Lucilia coeruleiviridis Macquart, 1855

Synonyms
- Phaenicia caeruleiviridis Macquart, 1855; Lucilia australis Townsend, 1908; Lucilia oculata Townsend, 1908

= Lucilia coeruleiviridis =

Species of fly

Lucilia coeruleiviridis, formerly Phaenecia coeruleiviridis, is commonly known as a green bottle fly, because of its metallic blue-green thorax and abdomen. L. coeruleiviridis was first discovered by French entomologist Pierre-Justin-Marie Macquart in 1855. It belongs to the family Calliphoridae and is one of many forensically important Diptera, as it is often found on decaying substances. L. coeruleiviridis is one of the most ubiquitous blow fly species in the southeastern United States, particularly in the spring and fall months.

== Taxonomy ==
The name L. caeruleiviridis may be a contraction of the Latin words "caerulei" and "viridis". Respectively, these words mean cerulean blue, and greenish and refer to the color of the fly's body.

== Description ==
=== Adult appearance ===
Like all green bottle flies in its family, the Lucilia coeruleiviridis adult is a metallic blue-green bodied fly. The facial region is white with large red compound eyes. There are also bristles present as well as plumose aristae. The thorax also contains bristles, all of which are evenly paired. Just behind the head, the anterior spiracle is black in color, as is the thoracic posterior spiracle. The meron, just below the wing, is bristled. The venation of the wings is “incomplete” in that it does not reach the wing edge. The basicosta of the wing, or the “shoulder” area, is yellow in coloration, and the calypters—the scale-like structures just below the wing base—are white and of unequal size. The legs of the adult are usually brown to black in color. Like most flies, it also has tarsal pulvilli, soft pads at the end of each foot used to “stick” to surfaces; in this species they are slightly yellow in color. As with all insects, coloration is very important in identification of a species, as is the presence of bristles. Sometimes, the presence of a pair of bristles on the thoracic plate is the only reliable way to distinguish one species from another.

=== Larval appearance ===
The white-bodied larvae of L. coeruleiviridis develop in three stages, called instars. In each instar, the larva grows larger and larger. Its only function in this stage is eating until the final growth stage to adult fly. The marked differences between each instar are seen in the spiracles of the maggot on the posterior end. During the first instar, the larva has “Y-V” shaped spiracles. The second instar can be characterized by the shape of the spiracles increasing in size as well as number in that the “Y-V” orientation becomes 2 distinct slits on each side. Likewise, the third instar larva has 3 larger spiracular slits on each side. It has also been seen that the larval stages of Lucilia coeruleiviridis are very similar to those of Lucilia eximia, though no sufficient data has been collected.

== Distribution and habitat ==
Lucilia coeruleiviridis has a Nearctic distribution, which means; of, relating to, or being the biogeographic subregion that includes Greenland and North America north of Tropical Mexico and is very ubiquitous in the southern United States. This particular blowfly is probably even the most preponderate of all species of blowflies in the southeastern United States during the spring and fall and will remain active during mild winters.

== Life cycle and behavior ==
=== Life cycle ===
Typically the blowfly, such as Lucilia coeruleiviridis, will deposit their eggs by way of the female's abdomen, which extends to form an ovipositor, in areas around accessible natural body openings such as eyes, nostrils, ears, mouth, anus and genitals or near wounds. The reason that these maggot mass formations are important is because it can indicate premortem or perimortem trauma. The life cycle of Lucilia coeruleiviridis has four stages of development. Calliphorids are necrophagous so the eggs are dispatched on rotting animal remains and generally hatch after roughly twelve hours. The larvae will then accumulate and nourish on the decomposing carcass. They will then undergo three larval stages (instars), which on average will take eleven to twenty days, if the ambient temperature is eighty degrees Fahrenheit. In the fourth stage, the larvae leave the food source and will pupate. The pupal stage can last from six to twelve days. A single female fly can lay in upwards of two thousand eggs in its life.

=== Behavior ===
Many of the species of major connotation are found in three families; Calliphoridae (blow flies), which includes Lucilia coeruleiviridis, Muscidae (house flies) and Sarcophagidae (flesh flies). Some species of Calliphoridae and Sarcophagidae are known to be parasitic, however, the prevailing rule for carrion feeding species is scavenging and such is true with Lucilia coeruleiviridis. Lucilia coeruleiviridis is a warm weather fly whose perfect temperature is between 75 and 85 degrees Fahrenheit (23-29 degrees Celsius). The females of this species are heavily attracted to flesh and are potential mechanical vectors.

== Importance ==
=== Medical importance ===
It has been found that the maggots of the green bottle fly prefer necrotic tissue and will leave living tissue alone, so they are often used in maggot therapy, or Maggot Debridement Therapy (MDT). This therapy is the intentional introduction of disinfected maggots raised to clean out wounds that will not heal, typically larger wounds. However, Lucilia sericata— the common green bottle fly— is the preferred species. The maggots have three primary duties: to clean out wounds by eating dead tissues, kill off the bacteria, and encourage healthy tissue growth.

=== Forensic importance ===
Blow flies are generally the first to arrive on a carcass and Lucilia coeruleiviridis is no exception. Because of this, and as with all flies of the family Calliphoridae, these flies are important for time of death estimations. The larvae are also the most abundant third-instar calliphorids that are found on a carcass. Unfortunately, not a lot of study has been done on the life cycle of Lucilia coeruleiviridis due to the fact that rearing of larvae has been largely unsuccessful. Therefore, the PMI (post mortem interval) for this species is still unknown, despite being an important PMI indicator species. Some Calliphorids of forensic importance, often associated with L. coeruleiviridis, include Cochliomyia macellaria, Chrysomya rufifacies, Phormia regina, Chrysomya megacephala, and Calliphora vicina. Other important Calliphorids are Calliphora vomitoria, Calliphora livida, Lucilia cuprina, Lucilia sericata, and Lucilia illustris.

=== Cultural importance ===
There is a fable that says Lucilia species can predict death and show up before it occurs. This idea may have originated much in the same way the theory of Spontaneous Generation came about around two millennia ago, based on how Calliphorids are typically the first insects to arrive on a carcass. The theory was a supposed process that life would come from sources other than seeds or parents. Understanding this makes understanding how this cultural fable may have come about much easier.

== Research ==
Much research has been conducted using Lucilia coeruleiviridis and other Diptera of the family Calliphoridae. L. coeruleiviridis is particularly important in the use of forensic entomology (the relationship between the study of arthropods and the legal system) and more specifically medico-criminal entomology, which usually deals with death and decomposition of carrion. The behavior and life cycle of L. coeruleiviridis, such as the length of time it takes to arrive to carrion, lay eggs, and for those larvae to grow is used to aid scientists in determining the time elapsed after the death of a body. Because the time of colonization and reproduction of different types of blowflies is so important, and species-specific, scientists are looking for techniques to more efficiently distinguish between similar looking larvae of various species. One potential plan is to develop an antigen –based diagnostic test that uses Mitochondrial DNA. This type of DNA is preferred because of its “high copy number, ease of isolation, and conserved sequence across taxa with supposed high mutation regions making discrimination between species, and even subspecies possible.” Using lateral flow technology, an identified species-specific antigen is tested to determine whether the fly larva belongs to the predicted species.
