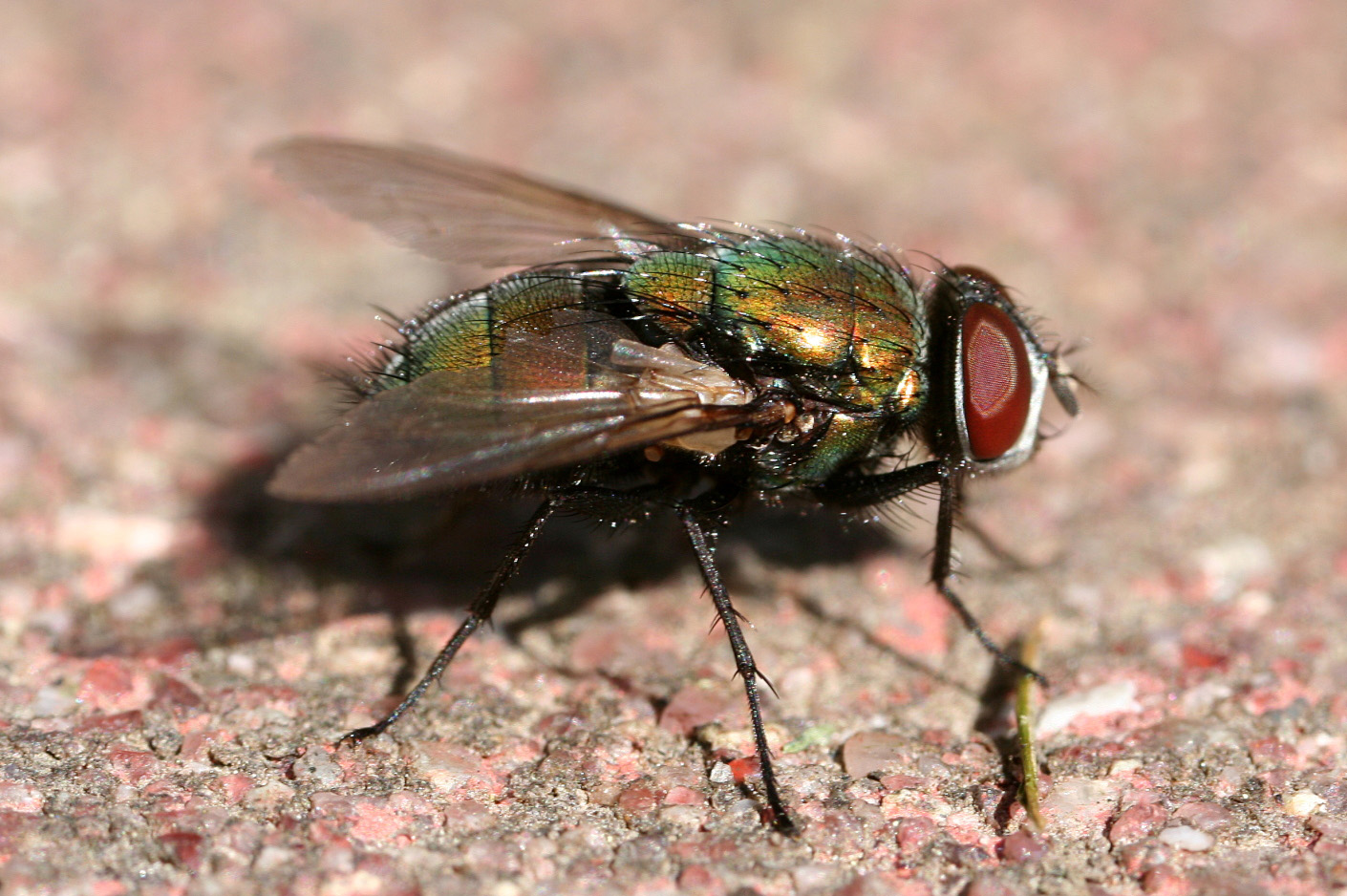
- Lucilia sericata

Scientific classification
- Kingdom: Animalia
- Phylum: Arthropoda
- Clade: Pancrustacea
- Class: Insecta
- Order: Diptera
- Family: Calliphoridae
- Subfamily: Luciliinae

Genera
- Lucilia Robineau-Desvoidy, 1830

= Luciliinae =

Subfamily of flies

The Luciliinae are a subfamily of Calliphoridae, or blow flies. According to Whitworth, the distinguishing characteristics of this subfamily are its shining green, blue, or bronze thorax and abdomen, suprasquamal ridge with a setae cluster, and a bare lower calypter. When measuring the head to frons ratios in females, the frons is not narrowest at the vertex as in most of the female Calliphoridae. This subfamily includes one genus: Lucilia.
