= Lucilia thatuna =

Scientific classification
- Kingdom: Animalia
- Phylum: Arthropoda
- Class: Insecta
- Order: Diptera
- Family: Calliphoridae
- Genus: Lucilia
- Species: L. thatuna

Binomial name
- Lucilia thatuna Shannon, 1926

Synonyms
- Phaenicia thatuna Rognes, 1991; Bufolucilia thatuna Rognes, 1991; Francilia thatuna Rognes, 1991

Species of insect

Lucilia thatuna belongs to the family Calliphoridae, the species most commonly referred to as the blowflies, and the genus Lucilia. Along with several other species of Lucilia, L. thatuna is commonly referred to as a green bottle fly. L. thatuna is very scarce and not much is known about this particular fly. It has been noted to reside in mountainous regions of the northwestern United States.

== Taxonomy and history ==
The genus Lucilia was first identified in 1830 by Jean-Baptiste Robineau-Desvoidy, a French entomologist and physician. In 1926, American entomologist Julie Bockman identified the species Lucilia thatuna during his work with the U.S. Bureau of Entomology. The species was also referred to as Bufolucilia thatuna and Phaenicia thatuna until 1991 when Knut Rognes synonymized these genera names with Lucilia. This species can be identified through the Keys to the Genera and Species of Blowflies (Diptera: Calliphoridae) of America North of Mexico (Whitworth 2006).

== Morphology ==
Although other species in the genus Lucilia are called "green bottle flies," L. thatuna can be identified by a shiny, bluish thorax and abdomen (Whitworth 2006). The mature adult, also known as an imago, generally ranges from 4.5 to 10 mm in length (Byrd 2001). Size is strongly correlated with the availability of nutrient rich food and environmental conditions (Florin 2001).

Adult females tend to be slightly larger than males, with smaller eyes placed more laterally on the head and the ocellar triangle not surpassing the halfway point to the lunule. The narrow frons on the male distinguishes it from other common species such as Lucilia cuprina and Lucilia sericata. Other distinguishing characteristics include the presence of three postacrostichal setae and the first flaellomere broader in width than the parafacial at the level of the lunule (Whitworth 2006).

== Life cycle and development ==
Once an adult female has fully developed eggs in her ovaries, she will follow the scent of decay to suitable carrion on which to deposit her eggs. It is theorized that females will feed on the protein secreted from the carrion before depositing a possible 200 eggs through her ovipositor onto carrion. Depending on temperature, the eggs will usually hatch within a day producing the first instar larvae. These larvae will feed continuously upon the decomposing carcass until they are large enough to molt and enter the second instar. This process is repeated again for the third and final instar after which, the larva leaves the corpse to pupate. During this time, L. thatuna actively rearranges its physical composition to emerge as an adult fly after approximately two weeks depending on temperature (Byrd 2001).

== Location ==
L. thatuna is not found in a wide variety of human habitats. Specimen collections have been few and sporadic over a ten-year period. Identification has only been documented in the United States, mainly in northwestern Idaho, Oregon, Montana, California, and Colorado. L. thatuna appears to have a local distribution in mountainous areas of elevation from 4,000 to 5,000 feet. Six specimens have been located on Mt. Moscow, two specimens on Lake Waha, three specimens in Latah County, and two specimens on Craig Mountain, Nez Perce County; all found in Idaho (Hall 1948).

== Medical importance ==
=== Myiasis ===
As part of the family Calliphoridae L. thatuna is involved in myiasis, as most other blowflies are. Myiasis is the infestation of live or necrotic tissue on a vertebrate host by fly larvae (Stevens 2003). This disease is initiated by dipterous eggs being laid in natural body openings or exposed wounds (Stevens 2003). As can be imagined, the condition produces a variety of problems depending on the location of the larvae. L. thatuna is described as a facultative ectoparasite; it is able to live as a sacrophage or initiate myiasis. Myiasis caused by a facultative ectoparasite is semispecific (Stevens 2003). Semispecific is synonymous to facultative parasite. These flies do not utilize living organisms to lay their eggs. Rather, they will use dead organic matter; however, when a wound is present the flies will lay their eggs in it, causing myiasis.

=== Surgical maggots ===
The genus Lucilia is commonly used in maggot therapy. Maggot therapy is the process of using fly larvae to treat infected wounds; it is also known as Maggot Debridement Therapy. The maggots that are used are mass-produced and disinfected. They are placed into open wounds healing on their own. This type of therapy is effective because the maggots only eat the necrotic tissue, thus cleaning out the wound and promoting healing. The larvae used in therapy use secretions to increase efficacy of their healing properties. They usually produce positive results via three mechanisms of action: Debridement, disinfection, and stimulation of healing properties (The Role of Maggots 2009).

== Forensic importance ==
L. thatuna is of forensic importance because it belongs to the family Calliphoridae which are more commonly known as blowflies. The genus Lucilia is overwhelmingly the first to appear on carrion if left exposed to the elements such as in an outside environment or where the carrion is accessible to insects. Upon reaching the carrion, females will oviposit their eggs in moist openings such as the eyes, nose, mouth, and anus. The reason for this is because the maggots do not regularly burrow through skin and need a soft place to begin feeding. Given an ambient temperature, forensic entomologists can use degree day calculations to produce an accurate PMI, or post mortem interval. PMIs are sometimes referred to as 'time of colonization.' Lucillia thatuna is not as well known as some of the other species, but is comparable in life cycle and forensic importance to that of Lucilia cuprina.

== Current research ==
Research from 1996 revolves around the evolutionary origin of the parasitic nature of genus Lucilia. This was analyzed using mitochondrial DNA and parsimony analyses by construction of phylogenetic trees. These tests were used to consider the relationships between the numerous species within the genus Lucilia and when each species developed a myiasis habit. The results show timelines of myiasis development within several of the Lucilia species (Stevens 1997).
