= L. mexicana =

L. mexicana may refer to:

- Leishmania mexicana, a protozoan parasite species
- Lucilia mexicana, a green bottle blow fly species found from southwestern North America to Brazil

== See also ==
- Mexicana (disambiguation)
