= Blera nigra =

Scientific classification
- Kingdom: Animalia
- Phylum: Arthropoda
- Class: Insecta
- Order: Diptera
- Family: Syrphidae
- Subfamily: Eristalinae
- Tribe: Milesiini
- Genus: Blera
- Species: B. nigra

Binomial name
- Blera nigra (Williston, 1887)

Synonyms
- Criorhina nigra Williston, 1887

Species of fly

Blera nigra , the golden-haired wood fly, is a fairly common species of syrphid fly first officially described by Williston in 1887 Hoverflies get their name from the ability to remain nearly motionless while in flight The adults are also known as flower flies for they are commonly found around and on flowers from which they get both energy-giving nectar and protein rich pollen. The larvae are of the rat-tailed type feeding on exuding sap or in the rot holes of trees.

== Distribution ==
This is a Nearctic species distributed in Northern North America including Alaska, and across Canada External map

== Description ==
For terms see Morphology of Diptera. External images of Blera nigra

Head

The frontal triangle (male) is shining black, the sides with silvery pollen. The vertical triangle black, scarcely shining, with cinereous (ashy grey) or yellowish pile. Female front broadly dusted across the middle and moderately narrowed above. The face of the female is reddish yellow with a shining black gena. The face of the male has a black-brownish base color that is obscured by silvery pollen covering the face except for a bare shining black median stripe vitta which expands under the antennal base. Sometimes there is a luteous spot on the cheeks immediately beneath the eyes. In profile the face is slightly receding from the antennal base to the oral margin. The sides of the face along the margins of the eyes is covered with short, sparse, white silvery pile. There is similar pile on the cheeks. On the face in the female a yellow triangle occupies the middle portion. The antennae are reddish yellow in the female. In the male the antennae are glossy brownish black. The flagellum is thinly pollinose and with a short oval shape. The eyes of male touching for a short distance Holoptic.

Thorax

The dorsum of thorax (scutum) and the postpronotum are greenish black. The scutum has four duller olivaceous stripes (vittae) . The dull orange pile is short.. In the female the dorsum of thorax is black, shining, with a bronze reflection and the pile is also short and thinner yellow. The scutellum is black. The pleurae are similar to the scutum.

Abdomen

The abdomen wholly shining black, nearly bare and at times with a greenish tinge. The pile on the sides especially in the basal angles are abundant, long and light yellow. The hind margins of the fourth segment obscurely. The apex of the fourth segment and the hypopygium are luteous.

Wings

The wings are ashy gray hyaline grading to yellow basally. The squamae Calypters are bright yellowish, with a yellow fringe. The halteres (#9) are yellow. The vein R_{4+5} is almost straight, orange at the base, and joins the costa just before the tip of the wing. The first posterior cell r_{4+5} is acute apically and extends almost to the wing margin before the tip.

Legs

The legs are extensively black. The joints, the tip of tibiae and of tarsal joints are luteous. In the female, joints are a little more extensively yellowish and the pile a little longer and brighter.

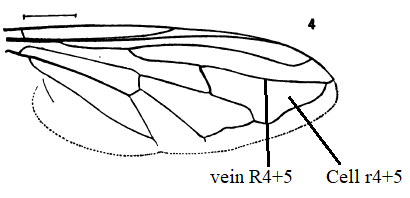
Blera wing veins

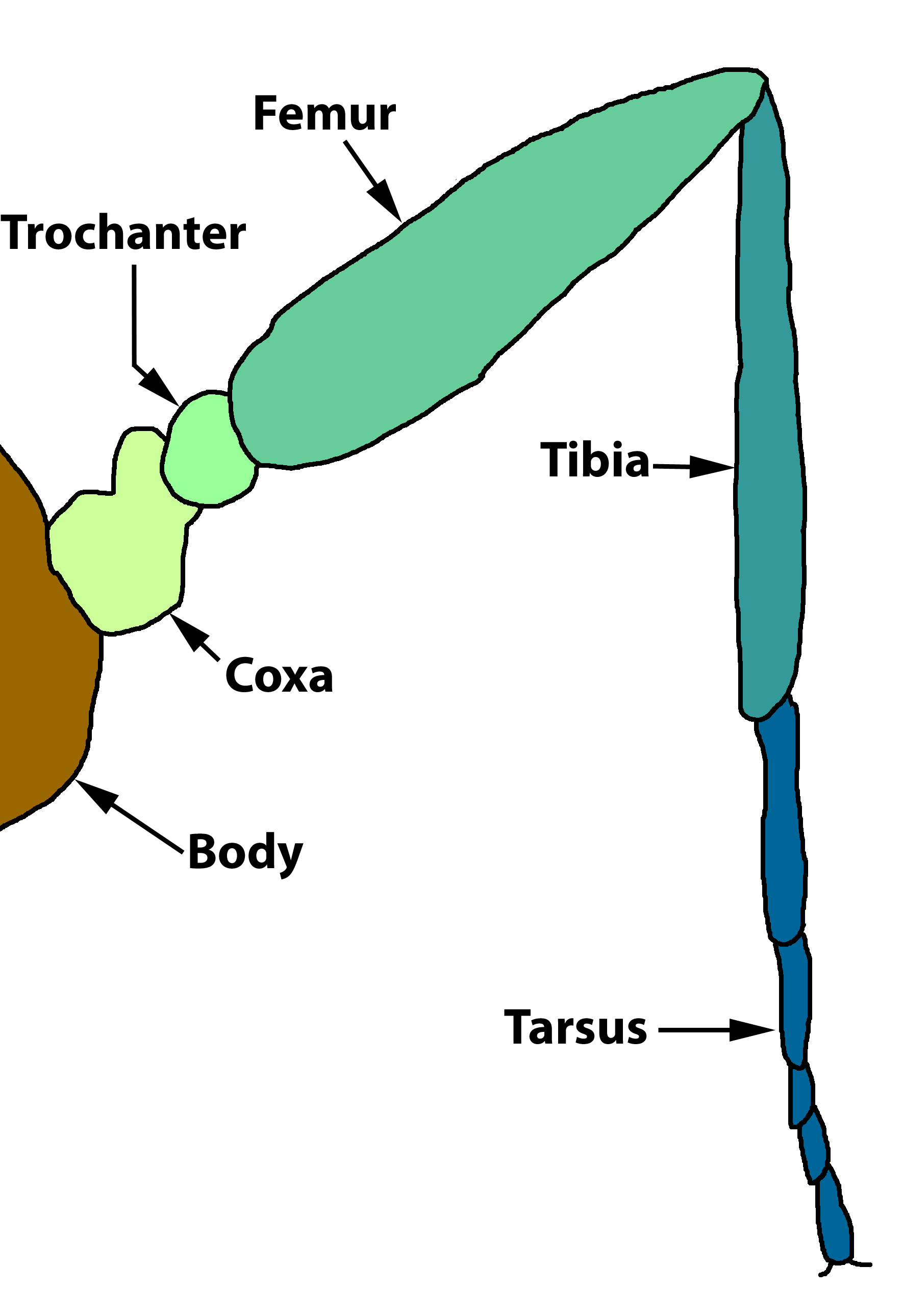
Insect leg

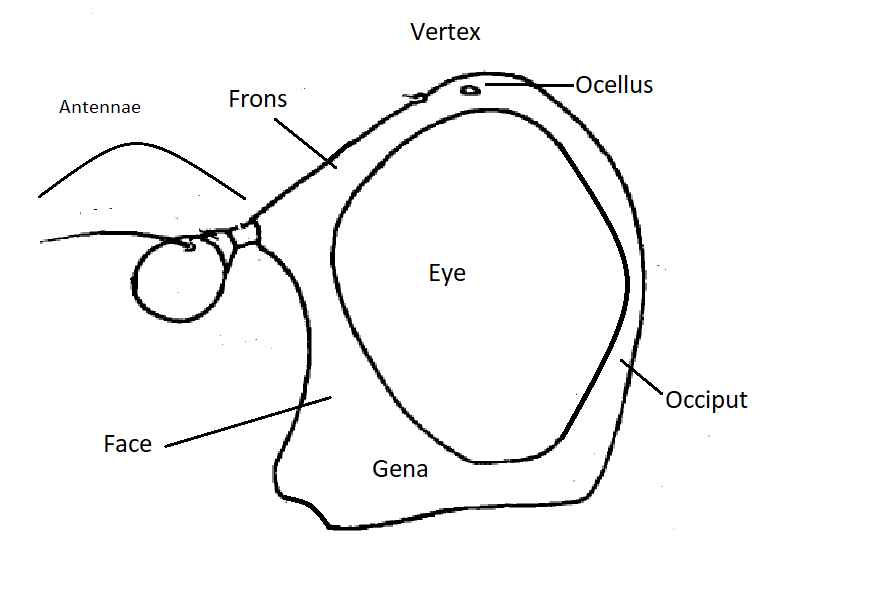
profile syrphid head

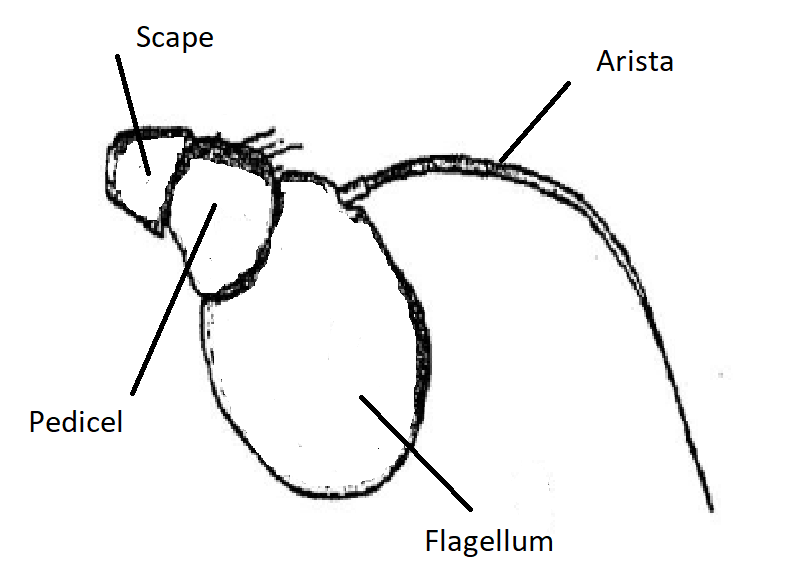
Antenna syrphid

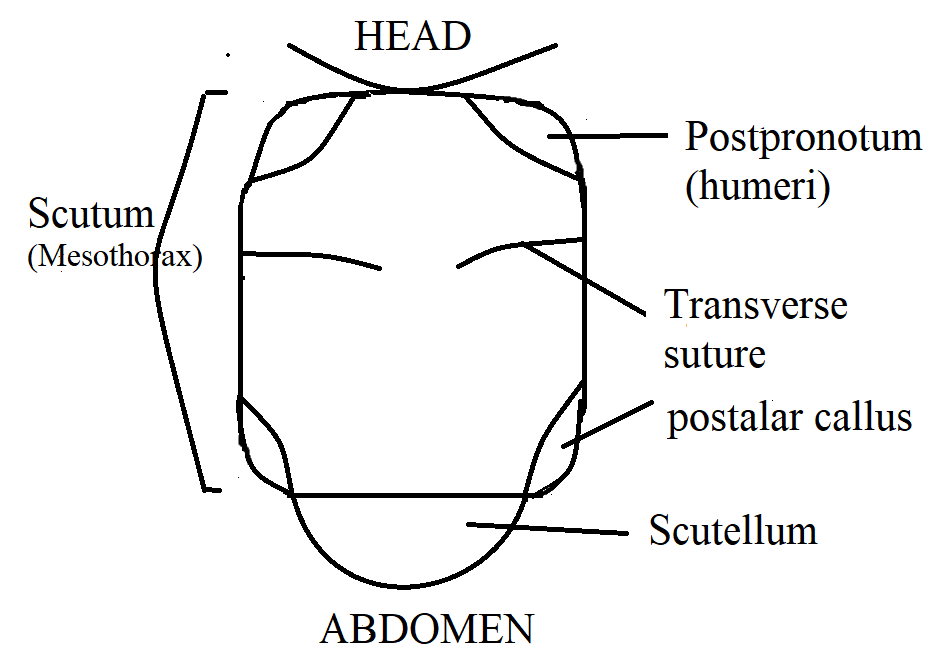
dorsal view of Syrphid thorax
