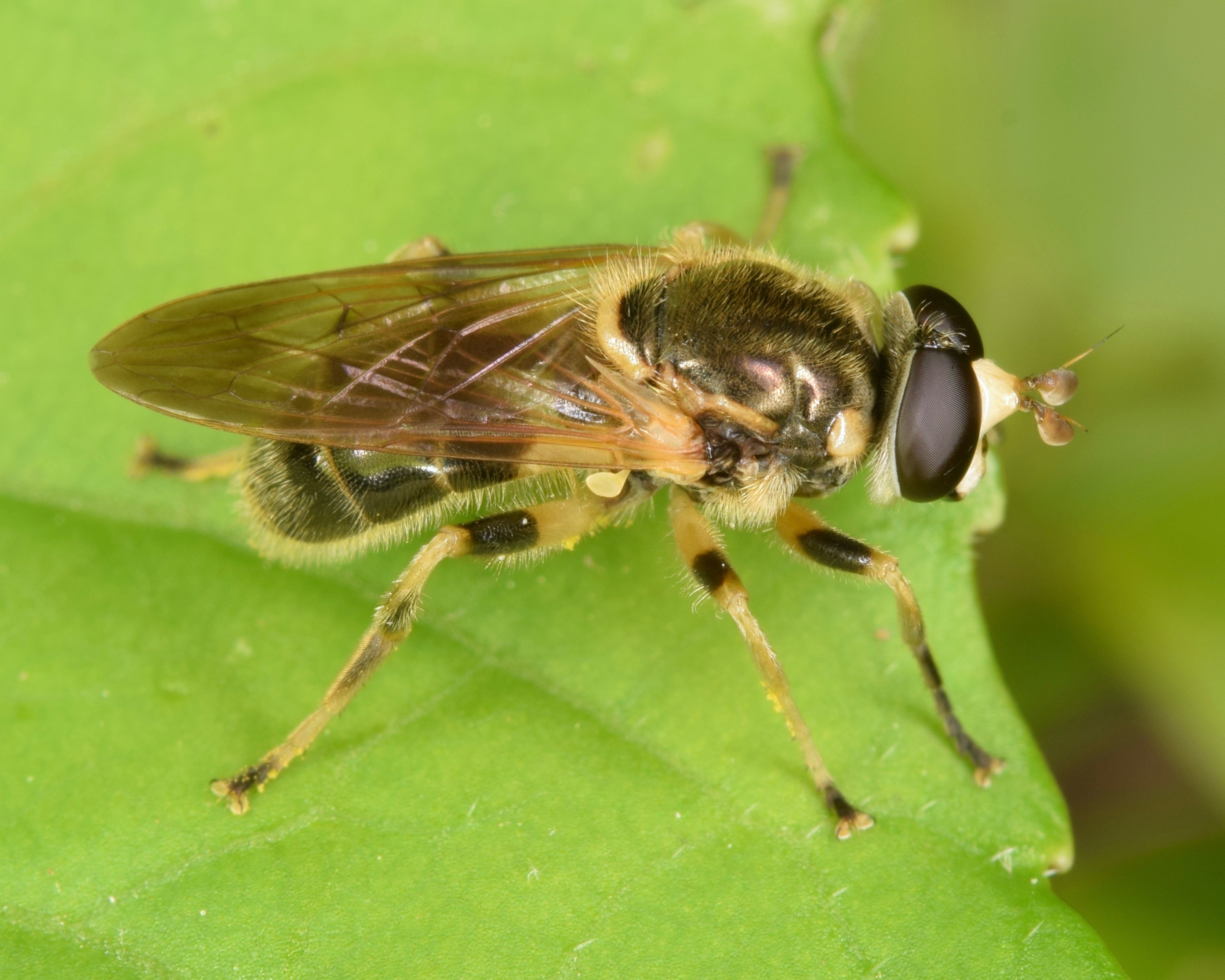

Scientific classification
- Kingdom: Animalia
- Phylum: Arthropoda
- Class: Insecta
- Order: Diptera
- Family: Syrphidae
- Genus: Blera
- Species: B. pictipes

Binomial name
- Blera pictipes (Bigot, 1884)

Synonyms
- Calliprobola pictipes Bigot, 1884

= Blera pictipes =

Species of fly

Blera pictipes, the painted wood fly, is a rare species of syrphid fly first officially described by Bigot in 1883. Hoverflies get their names from the ability to remain nearly motionless while in flight. The adults are also known as flower flies for they are commonly found around and on flowers, from which they get both energy-giving nectar and protein-rich pollen. The larvae are of the rat-tailed type, feeding on exuding sap or in the rot holes of trees.

== Distribution ==
This is a Nearctic species widely distributed across the Eastern and Central United States. External image

== Description ==
For terms see Morphology of Diptera. External images of Blera pictipes

Size
9–10 mm (0.35–0.39 in)
Head

The front in the female narrowed above, shining greenish black on the upper two-thirds and the pile is wholly yellow. The front is honey yellow or whitish yellow below. The. frontal triangle in the male is bare The Vertical triangle of the male is black, elongate; with moderately long, sparse, yellow pile. The Face honey yellow or whitish yellow. An obscure dark stripe noted below the antennal prominence The sides of the face are clothed with thin white pollen. The gena is black. In profile the face is moderately concave on the upper half, almost perpendicular below. The face in the female is less deeply concave above. The antennae first two segments are black or brown. The flagellum is broadly yellow on the basal half; in shape transversely broadly oval and rather large. The arista is yellow and darker apically. The frontal prominence is elongate and obtusely conical. The pile is very short, white and limited to the lower sides of the frontal prominence. The eyes are subcontiguous in males. The occiput is greyish yellow pollinose, with long yellow pile below.

Thorax

The dorsum of the thorax (scutum) is blackish green with yellow above the wings (postalar calus) and the lateral margins of the scutum behind the suture is yellow. Humeri are yellow with yellow pile. The pile of the scutum is yellow. The scutellum is blackish green with yellow pile and with a wide posterior border of the yellow. There is a yellow (vittae) stripe on the mesopleura.

Abdomen

The abdomen is shining black with variable yet distinctive yellow markings. The first segment narrow with single lateral spots on the lateral corners touching segment two. The sides of the second segment are marked with crescent-shaped spots, medial ends truncate and reaching rearward nearly at a right angle near to the middle of the segment. Their lateral ends broadened and reaching narrowly along the lateral margins nearly reaching the posterior angles, yellow; the spots rarely narrowly connected along the base of the segment. Third segment yellow spot is highly variable from a small lateral wedge to a crescent only slightly smaller than the spot on the second segment. The posterior margin of the fourth segments are reddish or reddish yellow. The venter is black,. The pile of the abdomen is yellow, somewhat cinereous on the apical median portion of the second and third segments. The third abdominal segment with a much narrower crescent-shaped spot than that on the second, its inner ends obsolete (indistinct).

Wing

The wings are tinged a with luteous brownish cloud, more hyaline posteriorly. In the female there is sometimes a cinereous brownish area apically. The squama Calypter is whitish, with a palid yellow fringe. The Halters (#9) are yellow. The vein R_{4+5} is almost straight and joins the costa just before the tip of the wing. The first posterior cell r_{4+5} is acute apically and extends almost to the wing margin before the tip.

Legs

The legs are yellow with black bands as follows: apical third or more of the femora shining black, tibiae except the middle ones, with an obscure subapical brownish or blackish band, anterior tarsi and last two segments of the posterior four, black or brown, posterior basitarsi brownish above, except both ends. The pile of the legs is pale yellowish. Hind coxa yellow.

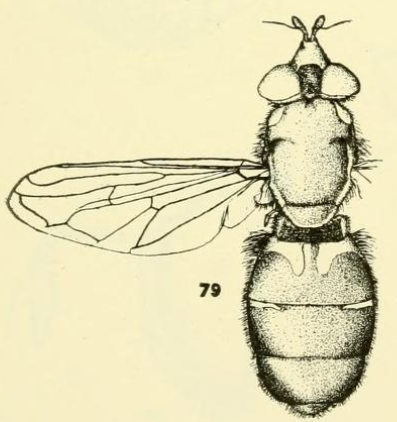
Blera pictipes

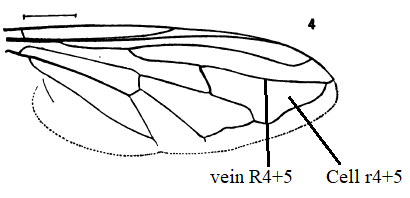
Blera wing veins

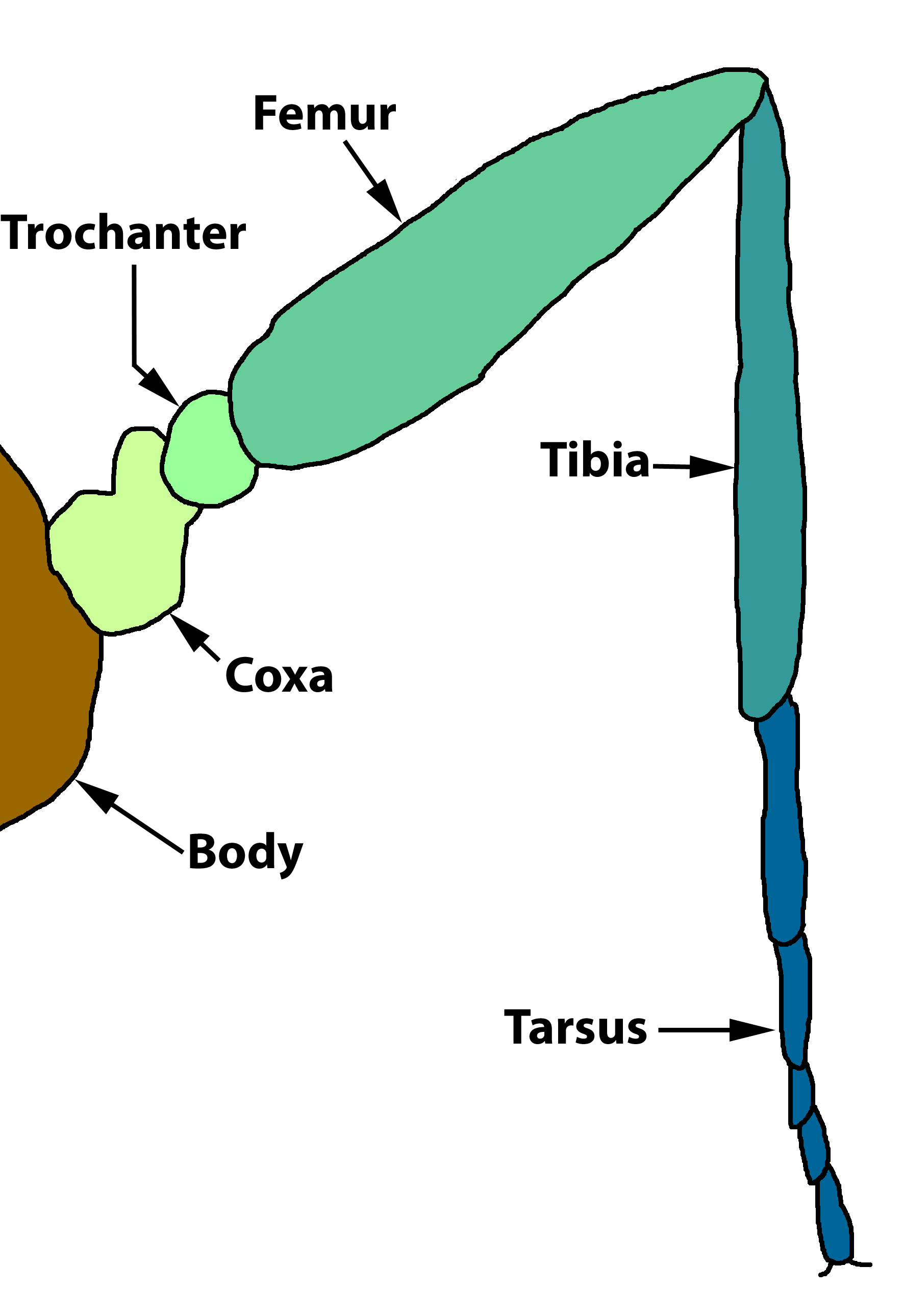
Insect leg

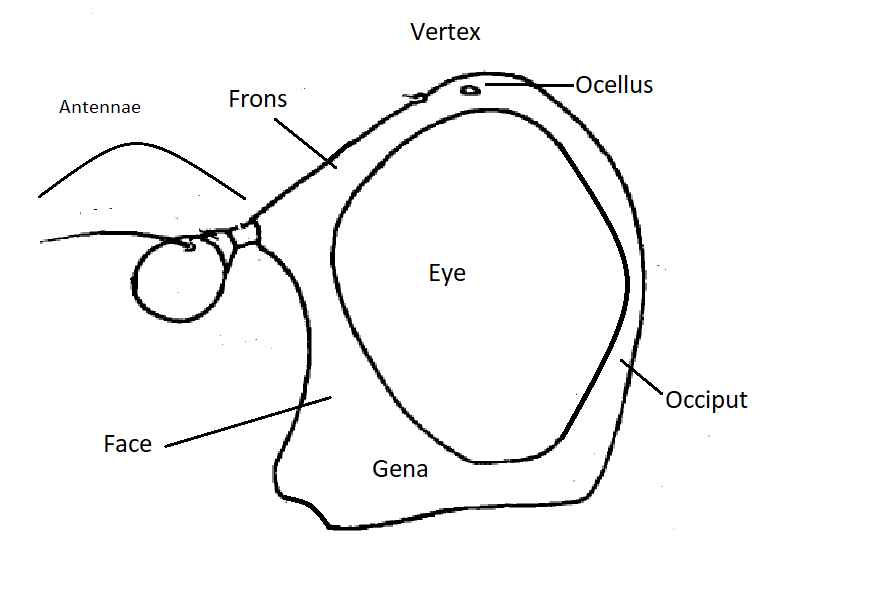
profile syrphid head

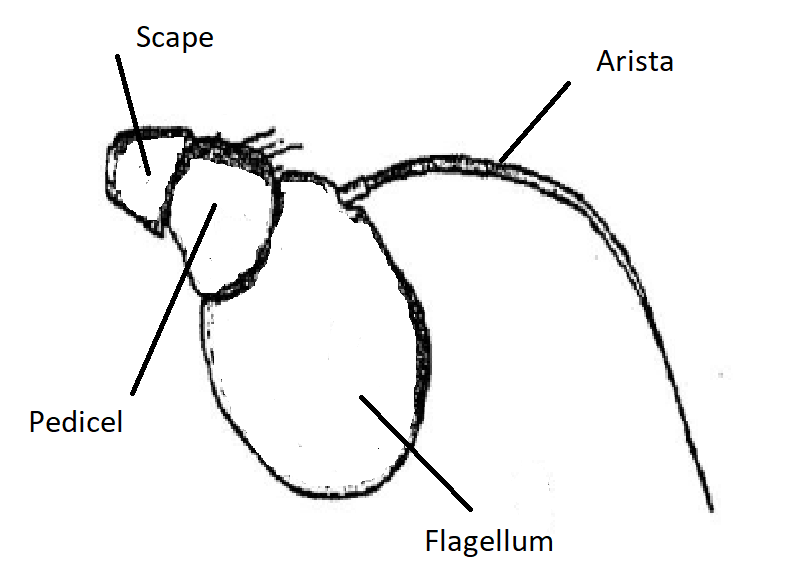
Antenna syrphid

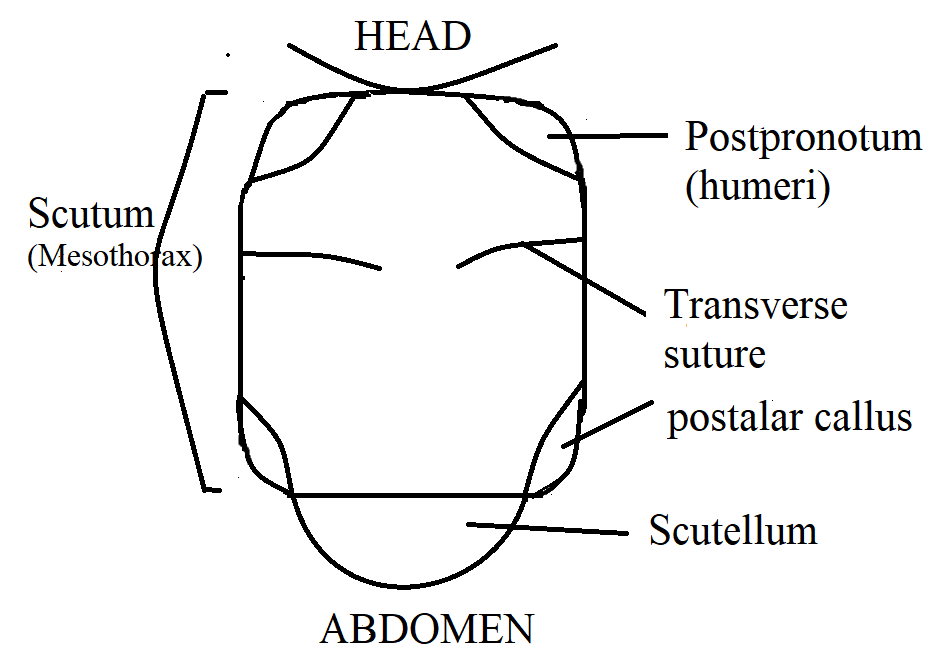
dorsal view of Syrphid thorax
