= Lucilia mexicana =

Scientific classification
- Kingdom: Animalia
- Phylum: Arthropoda
- Class: Insecta
- Order: Diptera
- Family: Calliphoridae
- Genus: Lucilia
- Species: L. mexicana

Binomial name
- Lucilia mexicana Macquart, 1843

Synonyms
- Lucilia infuscata Townsend, 1908; Phaenicia mexicana (Macquart, 1843); Lucilia unicolor Townsend, 1908

Species of insect

Lucilia mexicana is a species of blow fly of the family Calliphoridae, one of many species known as a green bottle fly. Its habitat range extends from southwestern North America to Brazil. L. mexicana is typically 6–9 mm in length with metallic blue-green coloring. This species is very similar in appearance to L. coeruleiviridis, the primary difference being that L. mexicana has two or more complete rows of post-ocular setae. L. mexicana has the potential to be forensically important in the stored-products and medicocriminal fields, but more research is needed for the fly to be used as evidence in criminal investigations.

== Taxonomy ==
Lucilia mexicana, a member of the family Calliphoridae, was first described by the French entomologist Pierre-Justin-Marie Macquart in 1843. The genera Phaenicia, Bufolucilia, and Francilia are now synonymous with the genus name Lucilia. In the 1940s, L. mexicana was expanded to include the species, L. unicolor, L. infuscata, and L. caesar. Disputes remain as to whether L. mexicana is also synonymous with L. coeruleiviridis, in which case the name mexicana holds priority.

== Description ==
As adults, the genus Lucilia is characterized by a shining green, blue, or bronze thorax and abdomen, a suprasquamal ridge (the ridge above the squamal lobes at the base of the wings) with setae, and no hair on the lower calypter. L. mexicana adults are most commonly differentiated from other Lucilia species by two or more complete rows of black post-ocular setae on the head.

Postoccular bristles of L. mexicana

L. mexicana is normally 6–9 mm in length. This species specifically has a metallic blue green thorax with purple tints, a propleuron with black setae and dark brown basal sclerites at the wing. The legs of adults are usually black. The abdomen is similarly colored like the thorax in four segments. The first segment is mainly purple, the second segment may or may not have a row a bristles, the third segment has a row of bristles, and the fourth segment has scattered erect bristles. The head of the species has black cheeks with black vestiture or hairs. The back of the head is also black with an orange colored metacephalon (a region on the posterior of the head) that distinctly shows the two or more rows of post-ocular setae. The main difference between the males and females is that males have their frontal plates separated with a wider frontal vittal and the females have a broader frons and larger head width.

The larvae in the third instar stage of L. mexicana does not have a defined sclerotized head capsule. It has a smooth body and lacks lateral processes. It has eleven posteriorly spinose dorsal segments with a median pair of tubercles on the upper border of the stigmal field. Lucilia larvae have posterior spiracles and tend to be larger larvae ranging from 9–18 mm in length. These larva bodies have peritreme, the area around the spiracles, with three distinct non-sinuous slits. The spiracle plates and button are also not heavily sclerotized.

== Life cycle ==
=== Egg incubation ===
Eggs are laid in carrion. The egg to first instar cycle of L. mexicana can take from 7–14 hours of incubation. As with all insects, developmental rates depend on temperature and degree days. Egg hatching does not occur at temperatures below 75 °F. At 75 °F, it takes the eggs 14.03 hours to hatch. Hatching also ceases when temperatures are higher than 99 °F, and at 99 °F it takes the eggs 8.12 hours to hatch. It has been discovered that the optimal temperature is 94 °F taking 7.77 hours.

=== Larval stage ===
The larval stage has three distinct instars. In the first instar, the spine is heavily pigmented with tubercles on the last segment. The second instar develops the spine into a complete band on segments 2–8. This stage also develops anterior spiracles with six to eight branches. The third instar has narrow or not heavily pigmented posterior spiracles and varying distribution of spines.

== Range and habitat ==
L. mexicana is geographically distributed in North and South America. Specifically, their range is in the southwestern United States and extends into Mexico. This species is also found in Brazil and Central America, although they are not abundant there. In Texas, the range for L. mexicana is similar to L. eximia. Lucilia mexicana is mainly found in wooded areas, but may also inhabit urban areas due to its attraction to animal and human feces, garbage and fresh carrion.

== Forensic importance ==
In the field of medico-criminal forensic entomology, L. mexicana can be used to determine post mortem intervals using a time of colonization on corpses because the fly is attracted to freshly killed animal carcasses. As for other fields of forensic entomology, stored product specialists should keep in mind that although attributed to L. coeruleiviridis, an episode of contamination of drying fruit in Sacramento Valley was most likely caused by L. mexicana. More research on the insect is needed in order to efficiently use it in criminal and health cases.

== Current research ==
A recent study investigated the Calliphoridae population present on pig carcasses in three different Texas cities during the summer months. Results showed that in two consecutive years, there was a considerable difference in the abundance of L. mexicana found in the three cities of Junction, Guadalupe, and Lubbock from one year to the next. Therefore, L. mexicana, among other calliphorids, can fluctuate in abundance at different individual locations over successive years. This is critical for forensic entomologists to consider when investigating evidence involving Calliphoridae.

Further research with DNA analysis of Lucilia sp. would clarify discrepancies between morphological and molecular similarities. One study about this involved a systematic collection of blowflies from the Mexican, Caribbean and Florida regions to test the reliability of DNA barcodes and develop a voucher collection, especially so that larvae could be identified accurately. Adults of the species L. coeruleiviridis and L. mexicana, found in Florida and Mexico respectively, are readily distinguished by morphology, but required analysis of at least two barcode regions to resolve through molecular genetics methods.

Research on degree days and hours for L. mexicana would benefit investigations involving post mortem intervals.
