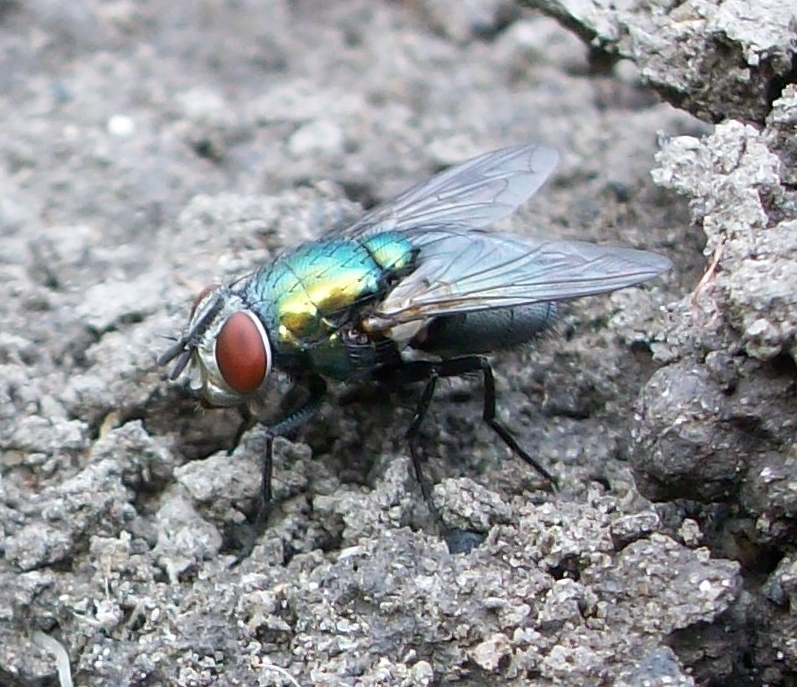

Scientific classification
- Kingdom: Animalia
- Phylum: Arthropoda
- Class: Insecta
- Order: Diptera
- Family: Calliphoridae
- Genus: Lucilia
- Species: L. caesar

Binomial name
- Lucilia caesar (Linnaeus, 1758)

Synonyms
- Lucilia angustifrons Townsend, 1908; Lucilia fulges (Harris, 1780); Lucilia ruficeps authors; Lucilia splendida (Meigen, 1826); Musca caesar Linnaeus, 1758; Musca fulges Harris, 1780; Musca splendida Meigen, 1826

= Lucilia caesar =

Species of insect

Lucilia caesar is a member of the fly family Calliphoridae commonly known as blow flies. L. caesar is commonly referred to as the common greenbottle, although this name may also refer to L. sericata. The adult flies typically feed on pollen and nectar of flowers. The larvae feed mainly on carrion.

Lucilia caesar is predominantly from Europe, Asia and North Africa. To induce diapause for the L. Caesar the flies need number of factors such as environmental, desiccation, areiation, being in a range with low temperatures and having a reliable food source for the growing larvae. In 2019 maggots of this species were discovered as myiasis in a wild boar in Italy.
