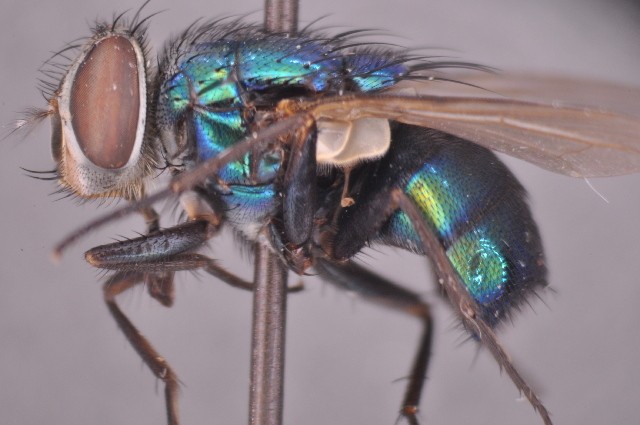

Scientific classification
- Kingdom: Animalia
- Phylum: Arthropoda
- Class: Insecta
- Order: Diptera
- Family: Calliphoridae
- Genus: Lucilia
- Species: L. cluvia

Binomial name
- Lucilia cluvia (Walker, 1849)

= Lucilia cluvia =

Species of fly

Lucilia cluvia is a species of blow fly in the family Calliphoridae.
