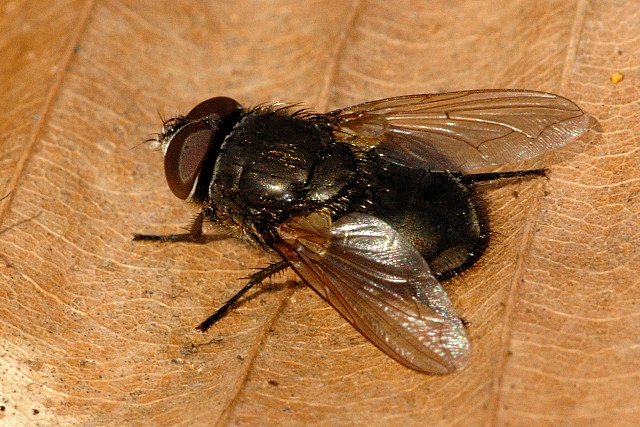

Scientific classification
- Kingdom: Animalia
- Phylum: Arthropoda
- Class: Insecta
- Order: Diptera
- Family: Calliphoridae
- Genus: Lucilia
- Species: L. pilosiventris

Binomial name
- Lucilia pilosiventris Kramer, 1910

= Lucilia pilosiventris =

Species of fly

Lucilia pilosiventris belongs to the family Calliphoridae, the species most commonly referred to as the blowflies, and the genus Lucilia.
