= Seraticin =

Antibiotic substance

Identifiers
CAS Number	1039756-04-1

Properties
Chemical formula	C_{10}H_{16}N_{6}O_{9}
Molar mass	364.271 g·mol^{−1}
- Except where otherwise noted, data are given for materials in their standard state (at 25 °C [77 °F], 100 kPa). Infobox references

Seraticin is an antibiotic discovered by scientists at Swansea University able to inhibit 12 different strains of methicillin-resistant Staphylococcus aureus (MRSA), as well as E. coli and C. difficile. The research was funded by the charity Action Medical Research, with support from the Rosetrees Trust. Seraticin was isolated as a compound of less than 500 Da molecular weight from the maggot secretions of the common green bottle fly (Lucilia sericata) It was patented in 2010 and has the molecular formula C_{10}H_{16}N_{6}O_{9}, but its chemical identity is unknown.

It is speculated that mechanism of action for seraticin is inhibition of septal formation and cell division.

Research into its potential continues as of 2026.
