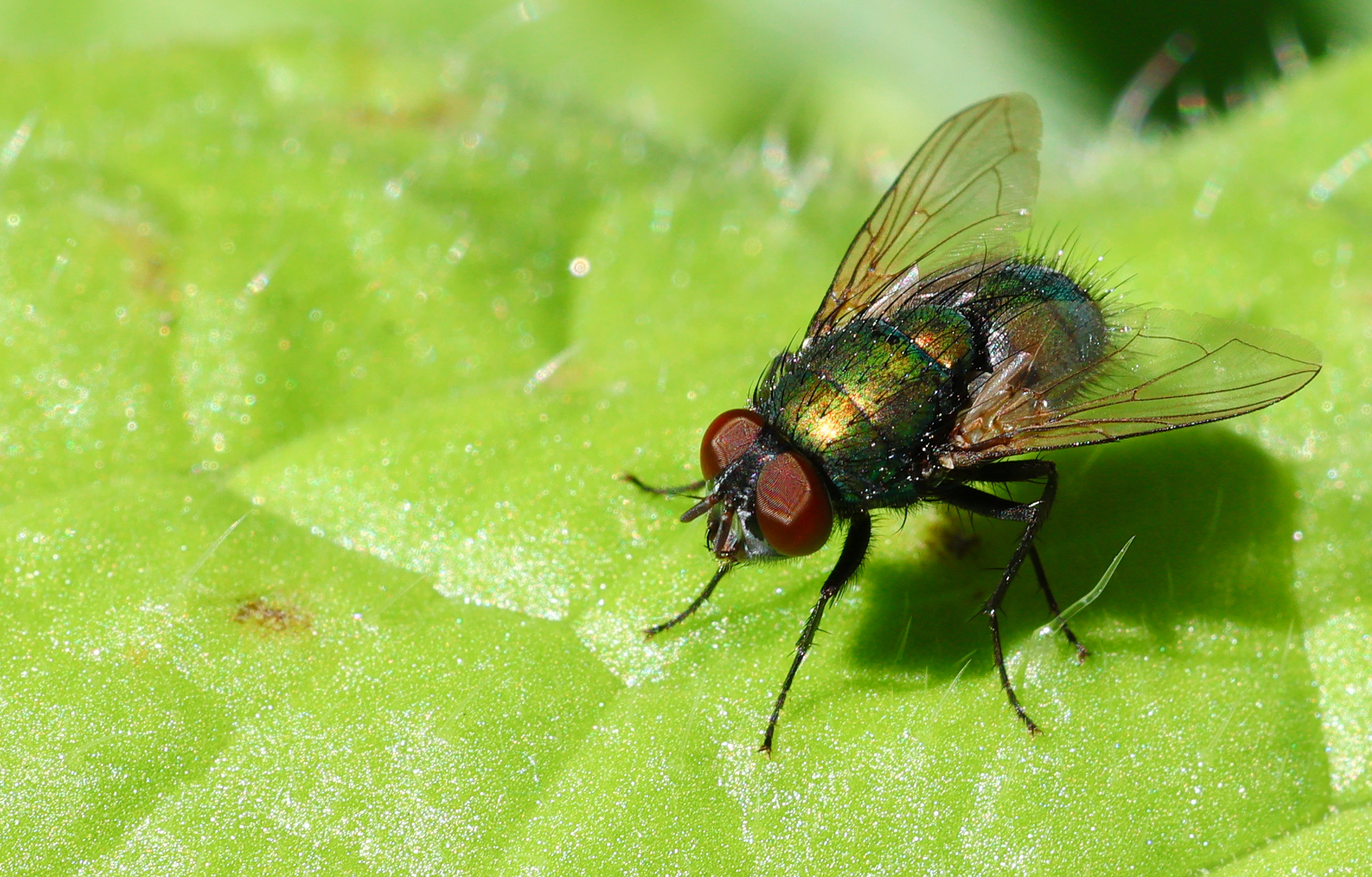
- Lucilia sericata

Scientific classification
- Kingdom: Animalia
- Phylum: Arthropoda
- Clade: Pancrustacea
- Class: Insecta
- Order: Diptera
- Family: Calliphoridae
- Subfamily: Luciliinae
- Genus: Lucilia; Robineau-Desvoidy, 1830

Type species
- Musca caesar Linnaeus, 1758, des. Macquart, 1834

Species
- See text

Synonyms
- Phaenicia Robineau-Desvoidy, 1863; Bufolucilia Townsend, 1919; Francilia Shannon, 1924; Caesariceps Rohdendorf, 1926; Dasylucilia Rohdendorf, 1926; Chaetophaenicia Enderlein, 1936; Acrophagella Ringdahl, 1942

= Lucilia (fly) =

Genus of insects

Lucilia is a genus of blow flies in the family Calliphoridae. Various species in this genus are commonly known as green bottle flies.

== Species ==
Genus: Lucilia Robineau-Desvoidy, 1830

- Lucilia adisoemartoi Kurahashi, 1988
- Lucilia aestuans Robineau-Desvoidy, 1863
- Lucilia affinis Robineau-Desvoidy, 1863
- Lucilia agilis Robineau-Desvoidy, 1863
- Lucilia albofasciata Macquart & Berthelot, 1839
- Lucilia ampullacea Villeneuve, 1922
- Lucilia andrewsi Senior-White, 1940
- Lucilia angustifrons Ye, 1983
- Lucilia angustifrontata Ye, 1992
- Lucilia appendicifera Fan, 1965
- Lucilia arrogans Robineau-Desvoidy, 1863
- Lucilia arvensis Robineau-Desvoidy, 1863
- Lucilia aurata Robineau-Desvoidy, 1863
- Lucilia aureovultu Theowald, 1957
- Lucilia azurea Meigen, 1838
- Lucilia bazini Séguy, 1934
- Lucilia bismarckensis Kurahashi, 1987
- Lucilia bufonivora Moniez, 1876
- Lucilia caerulea Robineau-Desvoidy, 1863
- Lucilia caesar (Linnaeus, 1758)
- Lucilia caesia Robineau-Desvoidy, 1863
- Lucilia calviceps Bezzi, 1927
- Lucilia carbunculus Robineau-Desvoidy, 1863
- Lucilia chini Fan, 1965
- Lucilia chrysella Robineau-Desvoidy, 1863
- Lucilia chrysigastris Robineau-Desvoidy, 1863
- Lucilia chrysis Robineau-Desvoidy, 1863
- Lucilia cluvia Walker, 1849
- Lucilia coelestis Robineau-Desvoidy, 1863
- Lucilia coeruleifrons Macquart, 1851
- Lucilia coeruleiviridis Macquart, 1855
- Lucilia coeruliviridis Macquart, 1855
- Lucilia cuprea Robineau-Desvoidy, 1830
- Lucilia cuprina Wiedemann, 1830
- Lucilia cyanea Robineau-Desvoidy, 1863
- Lucilia cylindrica Robineau-Desvoidy, 1863
- Lucilia delicatula Robineau-Desvoidy, 1830
- Lucilia diffusa Robineau-Desvoidy, 1863
- Lucilia discolor Robineau-Desvoidy, 1863
- Lucilia dives Robineau-Desvoidy, 1863
- Lucilia elongata Shannon, 1924
- Lucilia eximia Wiedemann, 1819
- Lucilia facialis Robineau-Desvoidy, 1863
- Lucilia fastuosa Robineau-Desvoidy, 1863
- Lucilia fausta Robineau-Desvoidy, 1863
- Lucilia fernandica Macquart, 1855
- Lucilia fervida Robineau-Desvoidy, 1830
- Lucilia flamma Robineau-Desvoidy, 1863
- Lucilia flavidipennis Macquart, 1843
- Lucilia floralis Robineau-Desvoidy, 1863
- Lucilia fulgida Zetterstedt, 1845
- Lucilia fulvicornis Robineau-Desvoidy, 1863
- Lucilia fulvipes Loew, 1858
- Lucilia fulvocothurnata Brauer, 1899
- Lucilia fumicosta Malloch, 1926
- Lucilia fuscanipennis Macquart, 1851
- Lucilia fuscipalpis Zetterstedt, 1845
- Lucilia gemma Robineau-Desvoidy, 1863
- Lucilia gemula Robineau-Desvoidy, 1863
- Lucilia germana Robineau-Desvoidy, 1830
- Lucilia graphita Shannon, 1926
- Lucilia gressitti James, 1971
- Lucilia hainanensis Fan, 1965
- Lucilia hirsutula Grunin, 1969
- Lucilia hominivorax Coquerel, 1858
- Lucilia hyacinthina Robineau-Desvoidy, 1830
- Lucilia illustris (Meigen, 1826)
- Lucilia incisuralis Macquart, 1843
- Lucilia inclyta Robineau-Desvoidy, 1863
- Lucilia indica Robineau-Desvoidy, 1830
- Lucilia ingenua Robineau-Desvoidy, 1863
- Lucilia insignis Robineau-Desvoidy, 1863
- Lucilia inventrix Walker, 1861
- Lucilia inventrix Walker, 1861
- Lucilia laetatoria Robineau-Desvoidy, 1863
- Lucilia laevis Robineau-Desvoidy, 1863
- Lucilia lepida Robineau-Desvoidy, 1863
- Lucilia libera Robineau-Desvoidy, 1863
- Lucilia ligurriens Wied.
- Lucilia limbata Robineau-Desvoidy, 1863
- Lucilia limpidpennis Robineau-Desvoidy, 1830
- Lucilia littoralis Blanchard, 1937
- Lucilia luteicornis Jaennicke, 1867
- Lucilia magnicornis (Siebke, 1863)
- Lucilia magnifica Robineau-Desvoidy, 1863
- Lucilia maialis Robineau-Desvoidy, 1863
- Lucilia marginalis Robineau-Desvoidy, 1863
- Lucilia marginata Macquart, 1843
- Lucilia meigenii Schiner, 1862
- Lucilia mexicana Macquart, 1843
- Lucilia mirifica Robineau-Desvoidy, 1863
- Lucilia modesta Robineau-Desvoidy, 1830
- Lucilia modica Robineau-Desvoidy, 1863
- Lucilia nigriceps Macquart, 1843
- Lucilia nigrifrons Robineau-Desvoidy, 1863
- Lucilia nigrocoerulea Macquart, 1843
- Lucilia nitidula Robineau-Desvoidy, 1863
- Lucilia nuptialis Robineau-Desvoidy, 1863
- Lucilia obscurella Robineau-Desvoidy, 1863
- Lucilia ovatrix Robineau-Desvoidy, 1863
- Lucilia pallescens Shannon, 1924
- Lucilia pallipes Robineau-Desvoidy, 1830
- Lucilia papuensis Macquart, 1843
- Lucilia parphyrina Walker.
- Lucilia peronii Robineau-Desvoidy, 1830
- Lucilia peruviana Robineau-Desvoidy, 1830
- Lucilia pilosiventris Kramer, 1910
- Lucilia pinguis Walker, 1858
- Lucilia porphyrina Walker, 1856
- Lucilia prasina Robineau-Desvoidy, 1863
- Lucilia pratensis Robineau-Desvoidy, 1863
- Lucilia pretiosa Robineau-Desvoidy, 1863
- Lucilia princeps Rondani, 1848
- Lucilia problematica Johnson, 1913
- Lucilia pubescens Robineau-Desvoidy, 1830
- Lucilia purpurea Robineau-Desvoidy, 1863
- Lucilia purpurescens Walker, 1836
- Lucilia pyropus Robineau-Desvoidy, 1863
- Lucilia rectinevris Macquart, 1855
- Lucilia regalis Meigen, 1826
- Lucilia rhodocera
- Lucilia richardsi Collin, 1926
- Lucilia rostrellum Robineau-Desvoidy, 1830
- Lucilia rufifacies Macquart, 1843
- Lucilia salazarae Kurahashi, 1979
- Lucilia sapphirea Robineau-Desvoidy, 1830
- Lucilia scintilla Robineau-Desvoidy, 1863
- Lucilia scutellaris Robineau-Desvoidy, 1863
- Lucilia sericata Meigen, 1826
- Lucilia shansiensis Fan, 1965
- Lucilia shenyangensis Fan, 1965
- Lucilia silvarum Meigen, 1826
- Lucilia sinensis Aubertin, 1933
- Lucilia snyderi James, 1962
- Lucilia socialis Robineau-Desvoidy, 1863
- Lucilia solers Robineau-Desvoidy, 1863
- Lucilia soror Robineau-Desvoidy, 1830
- Lucilia spectabilis Robineau-Desvoidy, 1863
- Lucilia spekei Jaennicke, 1867
- Lucilia spinicosta Hough, 1898
- Lucilia sumptuosa Robineau-Desvoidy, 1863
- Lucilia taiwanica Kurahashi & Kano, 1995
- Lucilia taiyanensis Chu You-Shen, 1975
- Lucilia terraenovae Macquart, 1851
- Lucilia thatuna Shannon, 1926
- Lucilia timorensis Robineau-Desvoidy, 1830
- Lucilia tomentosa Robineau-Desvoidy, 1863
- Lucilia urens Robineau-Desvoidy, 1863
- Lucilia valida Robineau-Desvoidy, 1863
- Lucilia varipalpis Macquart, 1843
- Lucilia varipes Macquart, 1851
- Lucilia vernalis Robineau-Desvoidy, 1863
- Lucilia viatrix Robineau-Desvoidy, 1863
- Lucilia vicina Robineau-Desvoidy, 1830
- Lucilia violacea Gimmerthal, 1842
- Lucilia violacina Robineau-Desvoidy, 1863
- Lucilia virgo Robineau-Desvoidy, 1830
- Lucilia viridana Robineau-Desvoidy, 1863
- Lucilia viridescens Robineau-Desvoidy, 1830
- Lucilia viridifrons Macquart, 1843
- Lucilia viridis Robineau-Desvoidy, 1863
