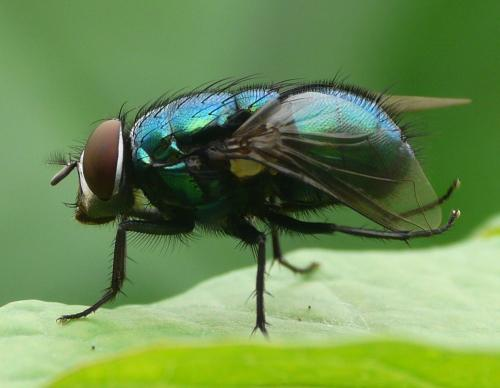
- Lateral view of Lucilia silvarum

Scientific classification
- Kingdom: Animalia
- Phylum: Arthropoda
- Clade: Pancrustacea
- Class: Insecta
- Order: Diptera
- Family: Calliphoridae
- Genus: Lucilia
- Species: L. silvarum

Binomial name
- Lucilia silvarum (Meigen, 1826)

Synonyms
- Bufolucilia silvarum (Meigen, 1826); Lucilia brunicosa Desvoidy, 1830; Lucilia nigripalpis Townsend, 1908; Musca silvarum Meigen, 1826

= Lucilia silvarum =

Species of fly

The common toad fly, Lucilia silvarum, is a member of the fly family Calliphoridae. This fly was first discovered by Johann Wilhelm Meigen in 1826 and is found most notably in European and Western Countries.

This species of fly is known for the ability of its larvae to cause myiasis. In addition, this fly is common around carrion which it finds by smell, as well as areas of high filth concentration.

== Description ==
Like all true flies, adults have a single pair of wings, and like most of the Calliphoridae, they have a characteristic metallic color and plumose aristae. The adults (imago) of Lucilia silvarum are generally found to be between 4.5–10 mm (0.18–0.39 in). They are difficult to distinguish from many closely related green flies.

The larvae are typically about 2 mm (0.08 in) long when they first hatch, and grow in size to approximately 17 mm (0.7 in).

== Distribution ==
Since the fly has been found to be a warm-weather fly, it is typically found in areas with temperatures between 75 °F (24 °C) and 85 °F (29 °C). Specifically, Lucilia silvarum is found in the countries: China, Denmark, United States, Finland, southern Norway, North Africa, Russia, and Canada.

== Life cycle ==
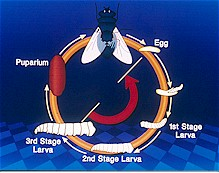
Life Cycle

The life cycle begins with the mating of the male and female species of the fly. Upon completion, the female begins oviposition and will lay the eggs on a place of interest, usually carrion. Once the eggs have been laid they will take approximately one full day to hatch, which is a short time period among flies. Upon hatching, the larvae will begin the three stages of larval development consistent with this family. The first stage occurs approximately after 2 days, while the second stage occurs after 2 and a half days, and finally the third stage occurs at approximately 4 to 5 days.

Following the third stage of larval development, the larvae become uneasy and begin to roam away from their original resting place. During this stage, the larvae are termed prepupae. This stage typically occurs 8–12 days after the eggs have been laid and the larvae will reach sizes up to 12 mm. Finally, the prepupae will begin to become a pupa after approximately 18–24 days, depending upon atmospheric conditions.

== Ecology ==
Larvae of the family Calliphoridae are typically scavengers of carrion and dung but this species is also notorious for infesting necrotic tissue in animals and humans. The adults typically feed on nectar and any other available sweet liquids.

In addition, Lucilia Silvarum is one of the two species of blowflies that causes myiasis in anurans. This is almost always fatal to the host. The adult blowflies deposit their eggs on the anurans' backs, and they hatch into larvae after a couple of hours. The larvae then enter the amphibian's body through the eye sockets or the nostrils. Because of their rapid growth rate, the larvae leave the amphibian's body in less than a week and migrate into soil in order to pupate. Generally, it takes them about nine days to mature into adult blowflies.

Studies have shown that typically parasitism by Lucilia silvarum has been fatal to the anuran host, but a recent study has found that there are two species of frog, the wood frog and boreal toad, that have been able to survive the infestation. Some species of frogs that are typical hosts of Lucilia silvarum are listed below, but these specific hosts are specific to the Canadian regions.

- Rana sylvatica – the wood frog
- Pseudacris maculata – the boreal chorus frog
- Bufo boreas boreas – the boreal toad
- Bufo hemiophrys – the Canadian toad

== Forensics ==
In the United States and Canada, this fly is typically the first species to show up on corpses. This causes it to be of great importance to forensic scientists, assisting in the determination of time of death of an individual.

The larvae molt several times during their development. It is this molting which allows forensic investigators to determine the time of death in forensic cases. Forensic scientists are able to measure the size of mouth parts, as well as the size of the individual larvae in order to distinguish a range of time of death for a deceased individual. However, the molting of larvae can be severely altered due to the climate, humidity, and other atmospheric conditions and all of these particular concerns must be taken into account before a precise time of death is determined. In the case of this fly, if a forensic entomologist were to find an empty puparium, it would be determined that the deceased individual died at least 20 days prior.
