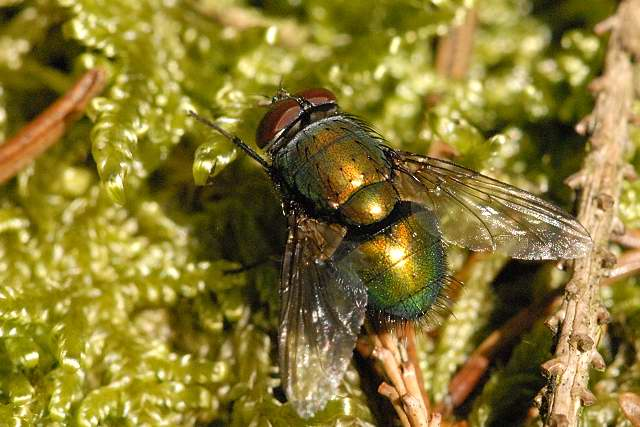
- Adult Lucilia bufonivora

Scientific classification
- Kingdom: Animalia
- Phylum: Arthropoda
- Clade: Pancrustacea
- Class: Insecta
- Order: Diptera
- Family: Calliphoridae
- Genus: Lucilia
- Species: L. bufonivora

Binomial name
- Lucilia bufonivora Moniez, 1876

= Lucilia bufonivora =

Species of fly

Lucilia bufonivora is a member of the fly family Calliphoridae, which are commonly known as blow flies. L. bufonivora is commonly referred to as the toadfly. The adult flies will typically feed on pollen and nectar of flowers, while the larvae are parasitoids that feed mainly on the living flesh of a toad, leading to its death. Most frequently the fly attacks the common toad (Bufo bufo), though it has been found on other frog and toad species. The toadfly is common in north west Europe.

== Description ==
The adult toadfly has large brown compound eyes, a bright metallic green thorax and abdomen clad with bristly black hairs, and a pair of membraneous, dark veined, translucent wings. The larvae are creamy white maggots, similar to those of other blow flies that are found on dead animals and rotting meat.

== Parasitism ==
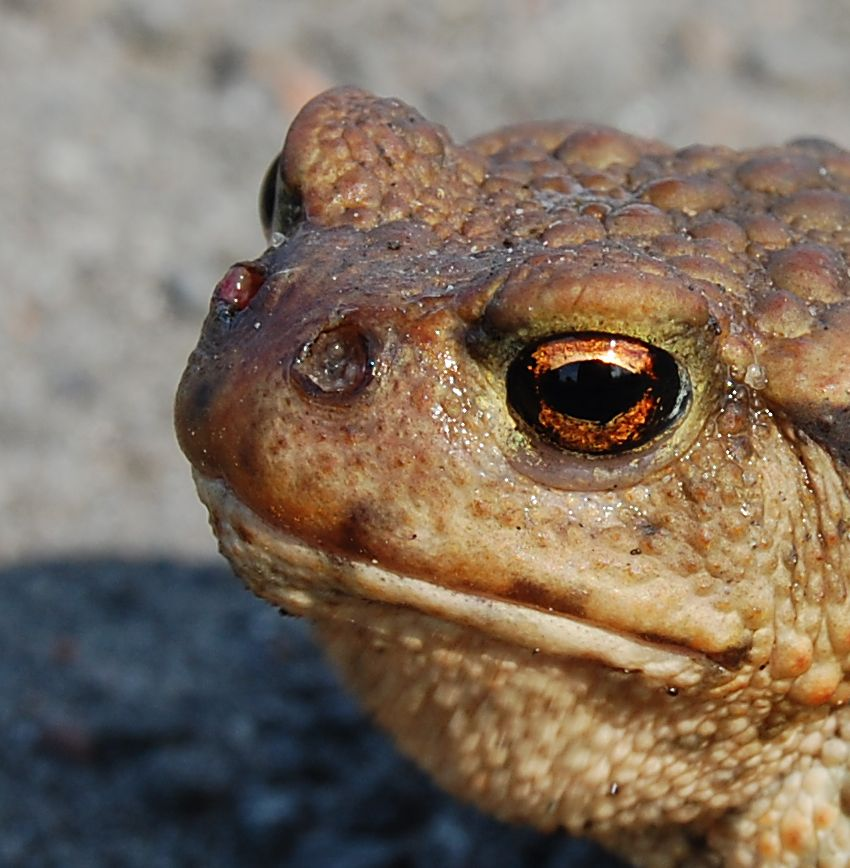
A Common Toad Bufo bufo infected with larvae of Lucilia bufonivora. The nostrils of the toad have been destroyed by the larvae already.

The adult toadfly lays its eggs on the skin at the entrance to the nostrils of the common toad although it has been known to infest other frog and toad species. It often preferentially chooses sick or injured individuals. On hatching, the larvae start to feed on the tissue of the nostrils and work their way into the nasal cavities. The larvae grow rapidly and as their appetite increases, they start to consume the eyes, the brain and other tissues of the host.

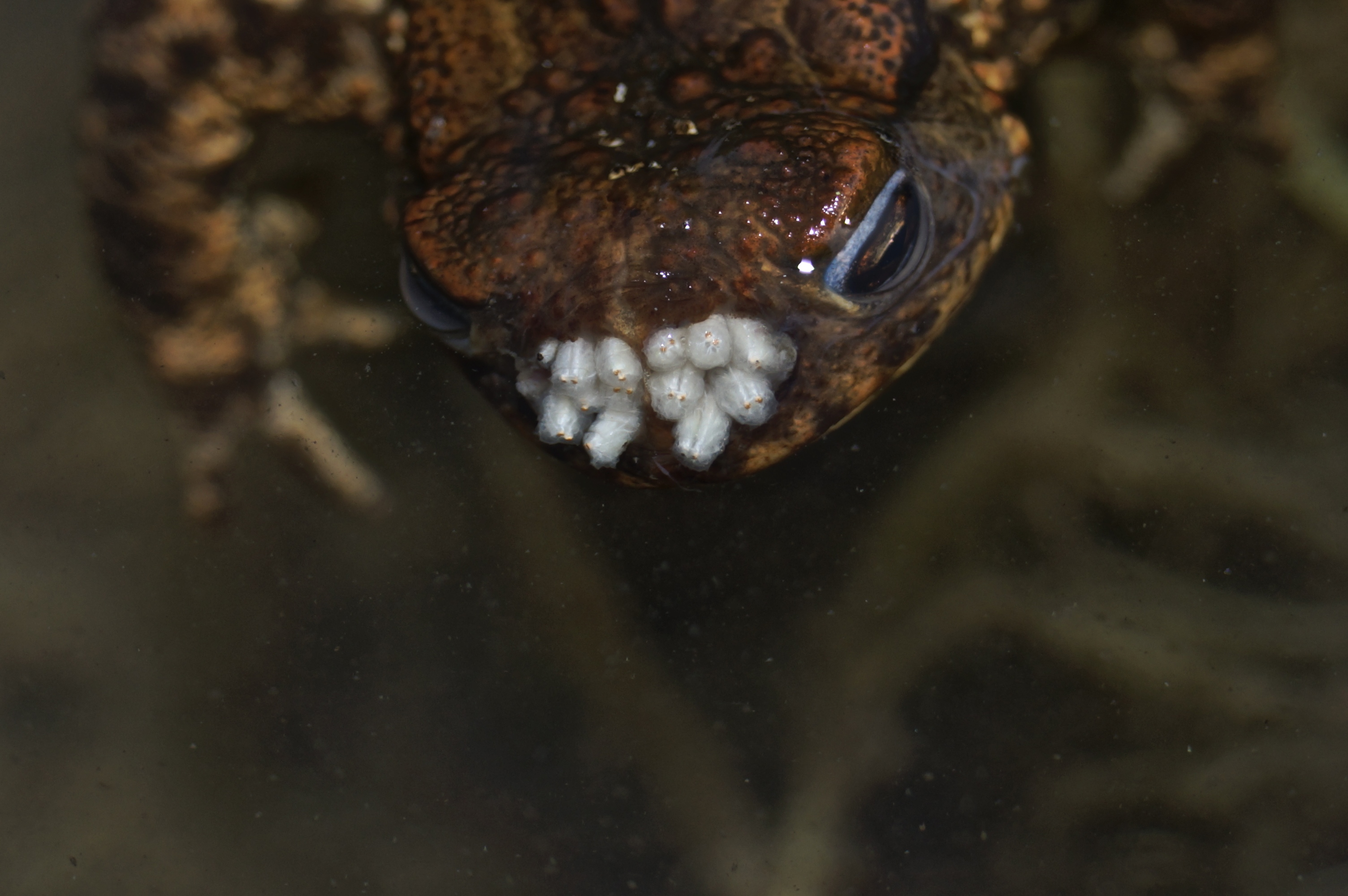
Toad underwater with Larvae of lucillia bufonivora, the nostrils of the toad have already been destroyed by the larvae.

When the toad has died and the larvae have totally consumed its tissues and finished their development, they make their way into the soil and pupate. The larvae are sensitive to temperature and only thrive between 14 °C and 29 °C. If they are cooled below this range, they will stop feeding and attempt to leave the host and bury themselves shallowly in the soil to hibernate.

In a study in the Netherlands, it was found that the fly selectively targeted larger toads, with no juveniles and very few one-year-olds being affected. Overall, 8% of the toads examined were hosts to the toadfly larvae and would later have died, indicating that the activities of this parasite have a significant effect on the toad population.
