= Lucilia gemma =

Scientific classification
- Kingdom: Animalia
- Phylum: Arthropoda
- Class: Insecta
- Order: Diptera
- Family: Calliphoridae
- Genus: Lucilia
- Species: L. gemma

Binomial name
- Lucilia gemma Robineau-Desvoidy, 1863
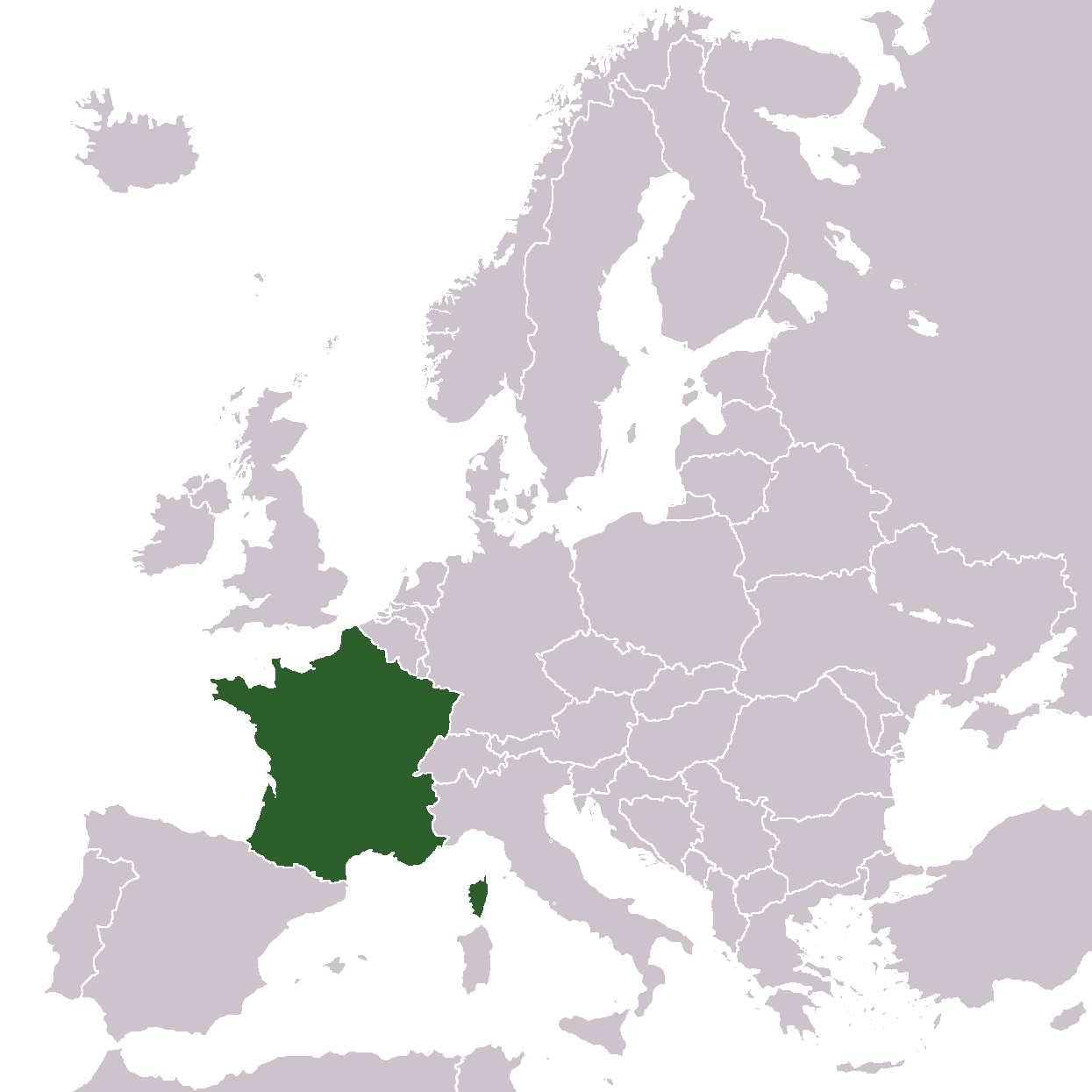

Species of fly

Lucilia gemma is a species of fly that belongs to the family Calliphoridae, the species most commonly referred to as the blowflies, and the genus Lucilia. Along with several other species of Lucilia, L. gemma is commonly referred to as a green bottle fly. The species is only known to be native to France.
