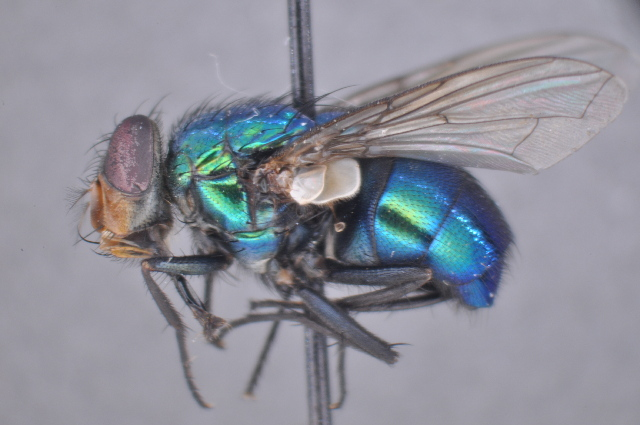

Scientific classification
- Domain: Eukaryota
- Kingdom: Animalia
- Phylum: Arthropoda
- Class: Insecta
- Order: Diptera
- Family: Calliphoridae
- Genus: Lucilia
- Species: L. eximia

Binomial name
- Lucilia eximia (Wiedemann, 1819)

= Lucilia eximia =

Species of fly

Lucilia eximia is a species of blow fly in the family Calliphoridae.
