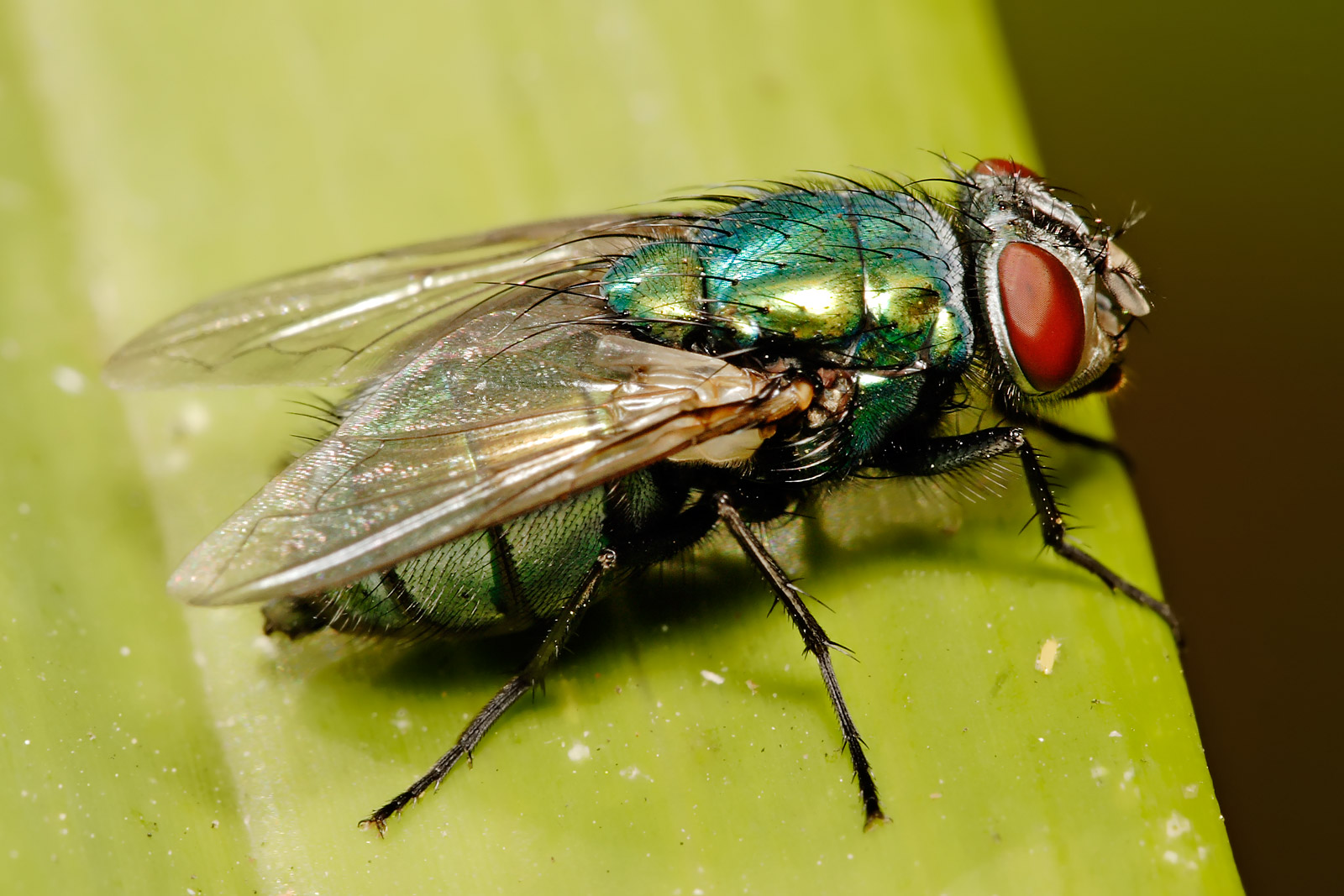

Scientific classification
- Kingdom: Animalia
- Phylum: Arthropoda
- Clade: Pancrustacea
- Class: Insecta
- Order: Diptera
- Family: Calliphoridae
- Genus: Lucilia
- Species: L. cuprina

Binomial name
- Lucilia cuprina (Wiedemann, 1830)

Synonyms
- Phaenicia cuprina (Wiedemann, 1830); Chloromelas gorgonea Lindner, 1949; Chloromelas heteroneura f. gorgonea Lindner, 1949; Odontomyia heteronevra Macquart, 1838; Stratiomyia heteroneura Walker, 1854; Stratiomys cuprina Wiedemann, 1830

= Lucilia cuprina =

Species of fly

Lucilia cuprina, formerly named Phaenicia cuprina, the Australian sheep blowfly is a blow fly in the family Calliphoridae. It causes the condition known as "fly strike" (myiasis). The female fly locates a sheep with ideal conditions, such as an open wound or a build-up of faeces or urine in the wool, in which she lays her eggs. The emerging larvae cause large lesions on the sheep, which may prove to be fatal.

== Anatomy ==
L. cuprina is a species of blow fly characterized by a metallic outer appearance and reddish eyes. They usually have a shiny green or greenish/blue abdomen with bronze/coppery reflections. Because of this, Lucilia species are known as the bronze bottle flies. Their body shape is round to oval and their length varies from 4.5–10 mm. They have two pairs of wings, the first pair being membranous wings and the second pair being reduced wings known as halteres, which are used for flight stabilization. Adults are easy to distinguish due to bristles on the meron, in addition to the arista, the prominent hair on the terminal antennal segment being plumose, or feathery. L. cuprina is most easily identified by its strong dorsal setae and black thoracic spiracle. It is almost indistinguishable from its conspecific L. sericata, and the difference between the two can be determined only by microscopic analysis of the occipital setae.

== Habitats and diet ==
Although known as the Australian sheep blowfly, L. cuprina can be found in other parts of the world, including Africa and North America. These blow flies like warmer weather with soil temperatures above 15 °C, air temperatures above 17 °C and below 40 °C. They like low wind conditions with wind speeds below 30 km/h. It is well known because of its importance in forensic entomology. L. cuprina can fly up to 10 miles (16 km) looking for food, and can be found on foods ranging from carrion to decaying fruit. Larvae are often found in shaded regions of carrion, while the adults prefer bright, open areas.

== Lifecycle ==
Adults of L. cuprina arrive early on carrion, appearing hours or even minutes after death. There, on the fresh body, they lay their eggs. The eggs then hatch into larvae that begin to feed and grow. After about five days, larvae enter the pupal stage. This is said to be an inactive stage, although many changes occur during this part of the flies’ lifecycle. The pupa does not feed, but rather uses the time inside the casing to change from a rice-like larva into an adult fly with wings and six legs. The whole process can take anywhere 11–21 days depending on environmental conditions, including temperature and food availability. In most cases, higher temperatures and a better plane of nutrition lead to a faster lifecycle. L. cuprina can have between four and eight generations per year depending mostly on temperature.

== Effects on sheep ==
Blowfly strike, or fly strike, is a serious welfare problem in the animal industry. This cutaneous myiasis or infestation not only causes severe discomfort or stress to the animal, but also causes death when left untreated. Ewe lambs and female sheep are primarily affected and are struck predominately in the rear quadrant of the animal due to fecal staining. Due to the difficulty in controlling these flies, considerable losses in the sheep industry occur every year. Also, concern is increasing for insecticide use and the surgical procedures done to control L. cuprina, making this not only an animal welfare issue, but also an economical one. The maggots of L. cuprina rapidly grow while eating the living flesh of the sheep, and secrete ammonia, thus poisoning the sheep. Sheep show signs of skin irritation by rubbing and biting the affected areas during the first few days after the eggs have been laid. This causes an inflammatory response in the sheep, resulting in severe irritation and pyrexia. Once a flystrike has started, other flies are attracted to the site. Although treatment is available, the delayed response time due to symptoms allows wool breakage in the affected area and fleece to be tender overall. Many predispositions to the flystrike make a host more favorable, including an infection with dermatophilosis and footrot, both of which can be treated and prevented. In some animals, a weak resistance can develop, but this immune response is often associated with a decrease in productivity, which is an undesirable trait.

== Prevention ==
Many options are available to prevent infestation. Many of the precursors drawing the flies initially are sanitary problems, which is where control measures are directed. Drenching, shearing, or crutching are basic procedures that can reduce flystrike. Crutching is the trimming of excess wool from the breech area, and the timing of both shearing and crutching is critical in reducing the amount of flystrike.

Surgical procedures are also performed in the sheep industry to help prevention, one of which is controversial due to its invasive nature. Tail docking to the correct length reduces the amount of staining in the breech area due to urine and fecal matter. Pizzle dropping severs the connective tissue between the penis and the body. Not only does it reduce the incidence of relentless pizzle rot in sheep, but it also decreases the amount of urine staining on the belly of the sheep. This procedure can greatly reduce the occurrence of flystrike on the belly area. Mulesing is an animal husbandry procedure that has recently faced opposition. Large scissors are used to cut off the backs of the sheep's thigh region. This procedure is usually carried out by untrained farmers without the use of any analgesia. It flattens out the wrinkles around the breech of the sheep, reducing the places where moisture collects, affecting the skin of the sheep and resulting in liquid protein exudate, which is attractive to L. cuprina. Mulesing also increases the amount of bare skin around the vulva during the healing process, reducing urine staining and amount of flystrike. This procedure does cause pain, but since it is considered the most effective method to prevent breech strike, it is seemingly justifiable. Mulesing is as effective as breeding sheep for less wrinkle (score 2), which are resistant to flystrike. Mulesing is a good prevention until breeding can remove the need for the operation in flystrike prevention

Insecticides have also been used often in prevention, but with improper application and heavy reliance throughout the years, insecticide resistance and residues within the wool have caused much concern. The primary reason for failures in using insecticides is attributed to poor application. Jetting, dipping, and backlining are the three most commonly used methods for insecticide application, and most of the chemicals used belong to these types of chemicals: synthetic pyrethroids, organophosphates, insect growth regulators, and spinosins. Insect growth regulators can provide the long-term protection against flies, and when applied correctly, provide protection during the susceptible times of the year. Resistance to this group of insecticide has been identified. Spinosins are good for short-term control of flies and leave no residues in wool. Many government agencies mandate that the wool be free of insecticidal residues, forcing withholding periods by farmers before shearing. During this time, the flock can become extremely sensitive to flystrike.

Baited traps are a good monitoring tool, and provide for some suppression of fly populations. Traps are a good addition to an integrated fly management program. A simple-to-use, nonchemical fly trap called Lucitrap targets L. cuprina. This trapping system is now sold under the name Lucilure. Many attempts have been made to find an alternative. Vaccinations are currently being developed to help, but none has yet proved effective in the prevention of flystrike.

== Demographics ==
Today, L. cuprina can be found throughout the world in various warm locations. Australia is one of the many places L. cuprina is found, and where it has been known to cause the most havoc. Its wide distribution is due to movement patterns and the traveling of humans and livestock in the last century. Although it can now be found worldwide, the species' origins are linked to afrotropical and oriental regions of the world.

L. c. cuprina is distributed in Neotropical, Oriental and southern Neartic regions, while L. c. dorsalis is found in Australasian, East, and sub-Saharan Afrotropical regions.

== Similar species ==
L. cuprina is one of many species of the family Calliphoridae. Though many of its species have similar characteristics, L. cuprina’s closest relative is its conspecific, L. sericata. These flies are very similar in appearance and morphological characteristics, which can sometimes cause errors when trying to differentiate between them. They each exhibit specific genetic variations, which can be distinguished by using random amplified polymorphic DNA and/or mitochondrial DNA sequences, and are known to cause myiasis (flystrike) in sheep. They are some of the first blow flies to arrive at a corpse and each has smooth larvae. Unlike L. cuprina, L. sericata does not usually infest live sheep. L. cuprina is a worldwide sheep pest, though it is usually found in dry climates. L. sericata has a coastal distribution.

== Forensic importance ==
L. cuprina is often used as a helpful tool to aid medical and forensic professionals. Since it is one of the first flies to occupy a corpse upon its death, its lifecycle stage can help determine time of death. Once it lands on a corpse, it lays its eggs, which hatch into larvae, followed by its pupal and finally the adult stages. Forensic professionals may then form a post mortem interval by the life stage found on the corpse. L. cuprina, although it is a worldwide pest, is very climate specific - dryer climates. A forensic investigator may conclude that a corpse has been relocated from its original location if it is found in a moist climate with L. cuprina on it.

The maggots of L. cuprina have been used by medical doctors for debridement therapy for patients who suffer from wounds that are healing slowly. The maggots cleanse the wound by eating the dead and infectious skin and preventing gangrene and further infection.

== Ongoing research ==
Current research involving L. cuprina and other Lucilia species range from identifying genetic variation between the different species to the ultrastructure of flies' eggs. Egg ultrastructure has recently become important in the field of forensic science. It is used to distinguish L. cuprina eggs from other Lucilia species, such as Lucilia illustris and Lucilia sericata. This defining feature becomes relevant when determining the post mortem interval because it varies with each species. Other ongoing research includes bacteria and fungi associated with the insect. Numerous studies have been conducted to determine if the fly is a mechanical vector of bacteria. So far, many have been found only to be carriers and cannot transmit disease. There have also been studies on the taxonomic grouping of Lucilia based on geography. The use of RAPD (Random amplified polymorphic DNA analysis) and mitochondrial DNA sequencing has been used to investigate genetic variation within the species.
