= Calypter =

Lobes on the forewing of flies

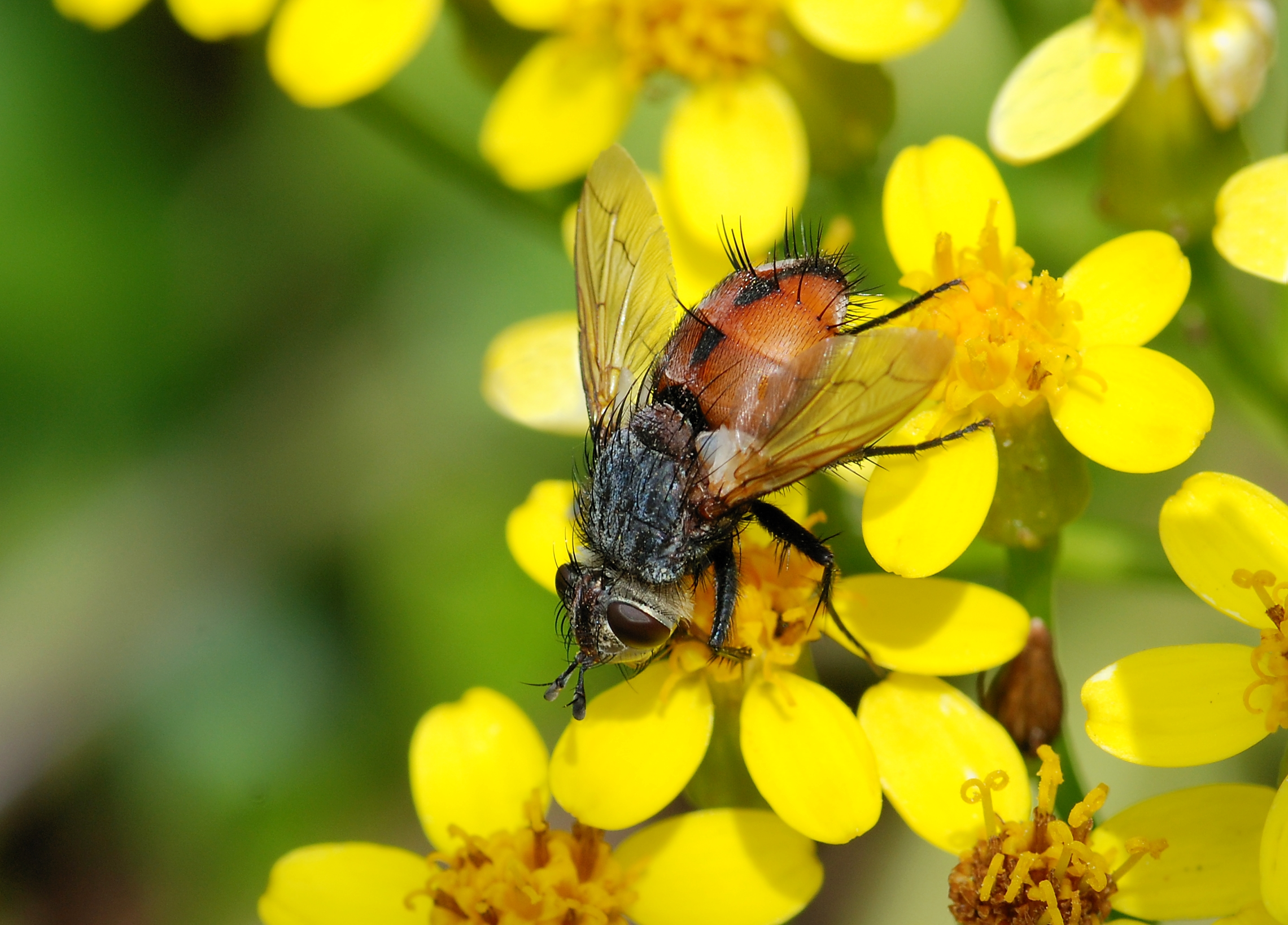
A Tachina sp. fly showing white calypters at the base of the wings

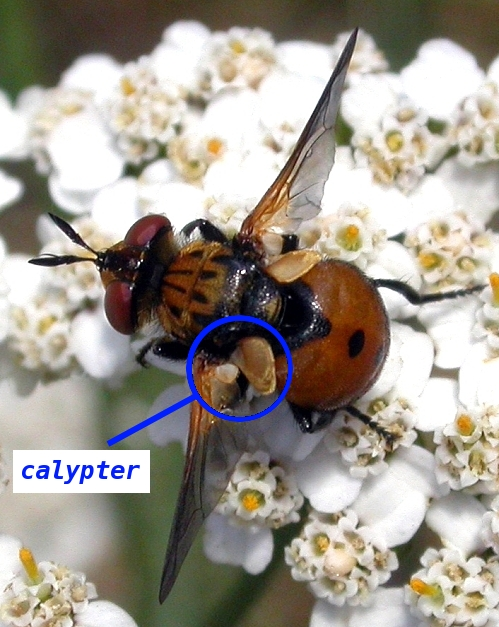
Calypter of a Tachinid

A calypter is either of two posterior lobes of the posterior margin of the forewing of flies between the extreme posterior wing base and the alula, which covers the halteres. Species of the subsection acalyptratae are noted for having largely reduced or even lacking calypters.

== Description ==
The lower calypter is the proximal calypter (also known as the squama or tegula) and the upper calypter is the distal calypter (known also as the squamula).

It is connected to its own muscle through the third axillary, which allows it to move independently of the wing. In calypterate flies four muscles control the calypters, but only two muscles control the calypters in acalyptrate flies. Movement of the fourth axillary sclerite causes a direct change in the orientation of the calypters in relation to each other and the wing. This autonomy allows for swift flight manoeuvres, especially among hover flies.

== Use ==
While the exact use of calypters is not fully known, it is hypothesised to prevent wind turbulence from affecting movement of the haltere - a modified hindwing, which allows for fast movement and change in orientation in flight - allowing for more precise detection of body position. It also assists in swift flight manoeuvres in some families.
