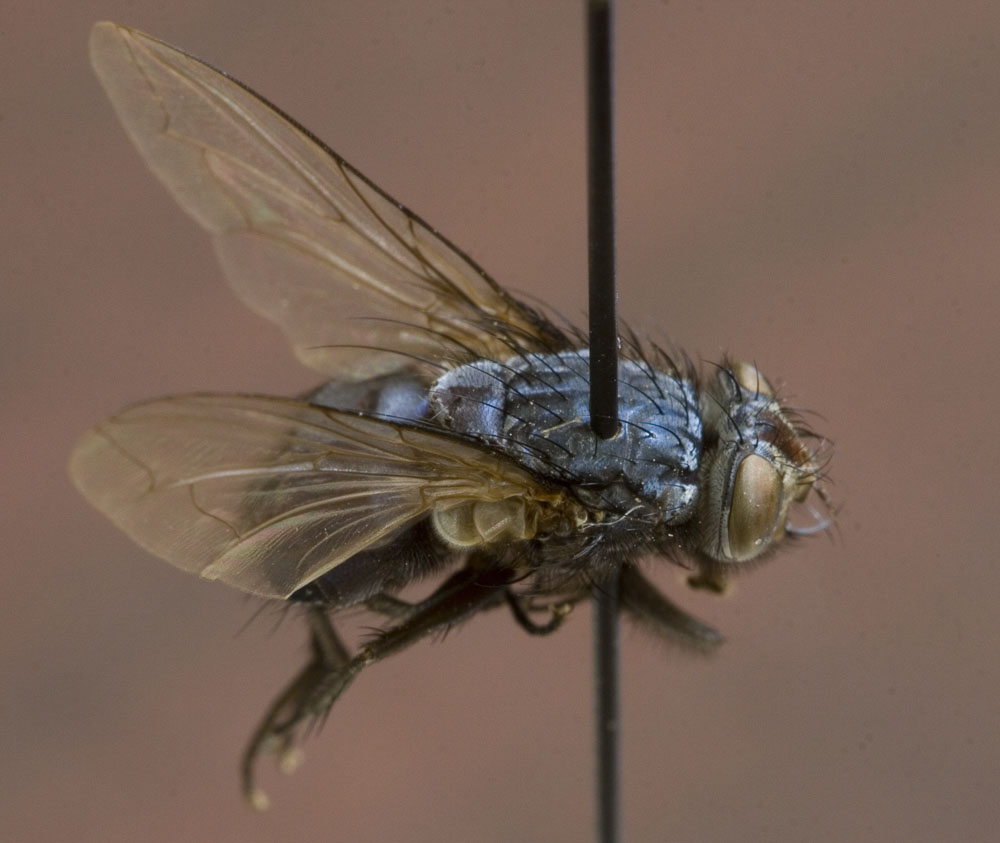

Scientific classification
- Kingdom: Animalia
- Phylum: Arthropoda
- Class: Insecta
- Order: Diptera
- Family: Calliphoridae
- Genus: Calliphora
- Species: C. livida

Binomial name
- Calliphora livida D. G. Hall, 1948

= Calliphora livida =

Species of fly

Calliphora livida is a member of the family Calliphoridae, the blow flies. This large family includes the genus Calliphora, the "blue bottle flies". This genus is important in the field of forensic entomology because of its value in post-mortem interval estimation.

== Taxonomy ==
Calliphora livida, known as the slow-flying and loud-buzzing blue bottle fly, was first discovered by Jean-Baptiste Robineau-Desvoidy who originally thought C. livida was part of the species Calliphora viridescens. Robineau-Desvoidy described C. viridescens in 1830, but it was not until 1948 that C. livida was described as a separate species; in 1948, D. G. Hall introduced one of the first textbooks of entomology, where he described a number of new species including C. livida. C. livida is also very similar to the species C. coloradensis, which when suffering from teneral has similar genal dilation.

== Description ==
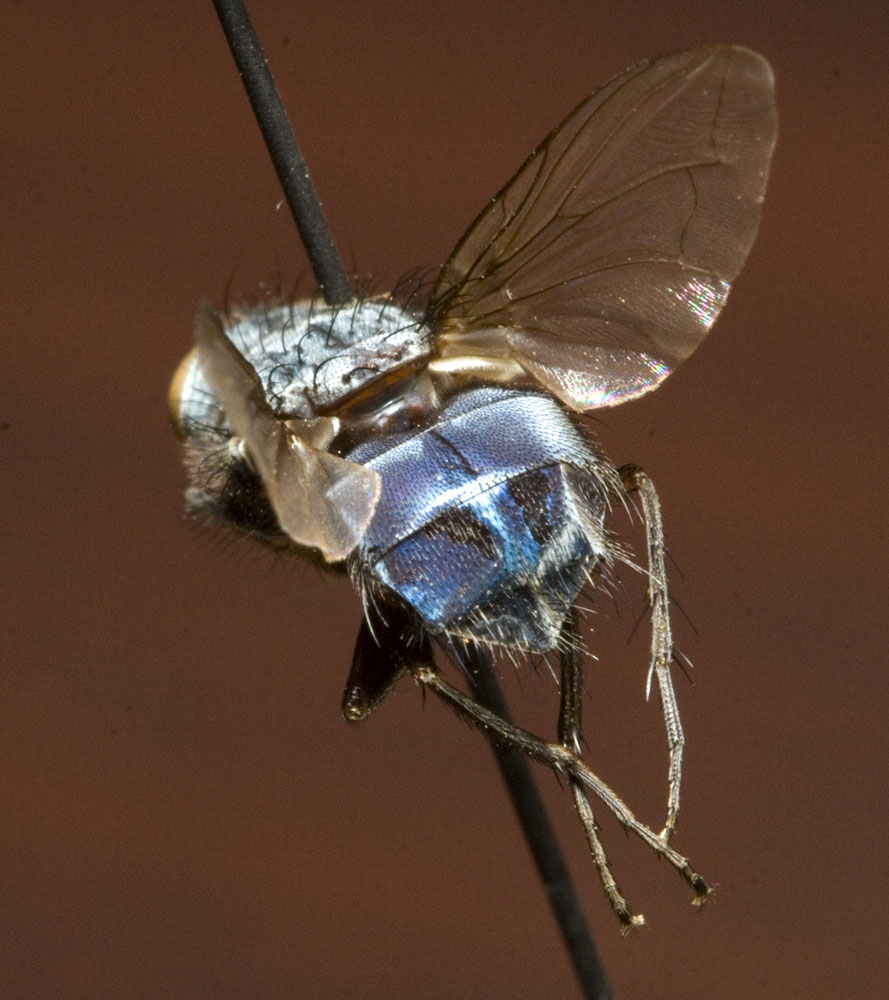
Dorsocaudal view of C. livida

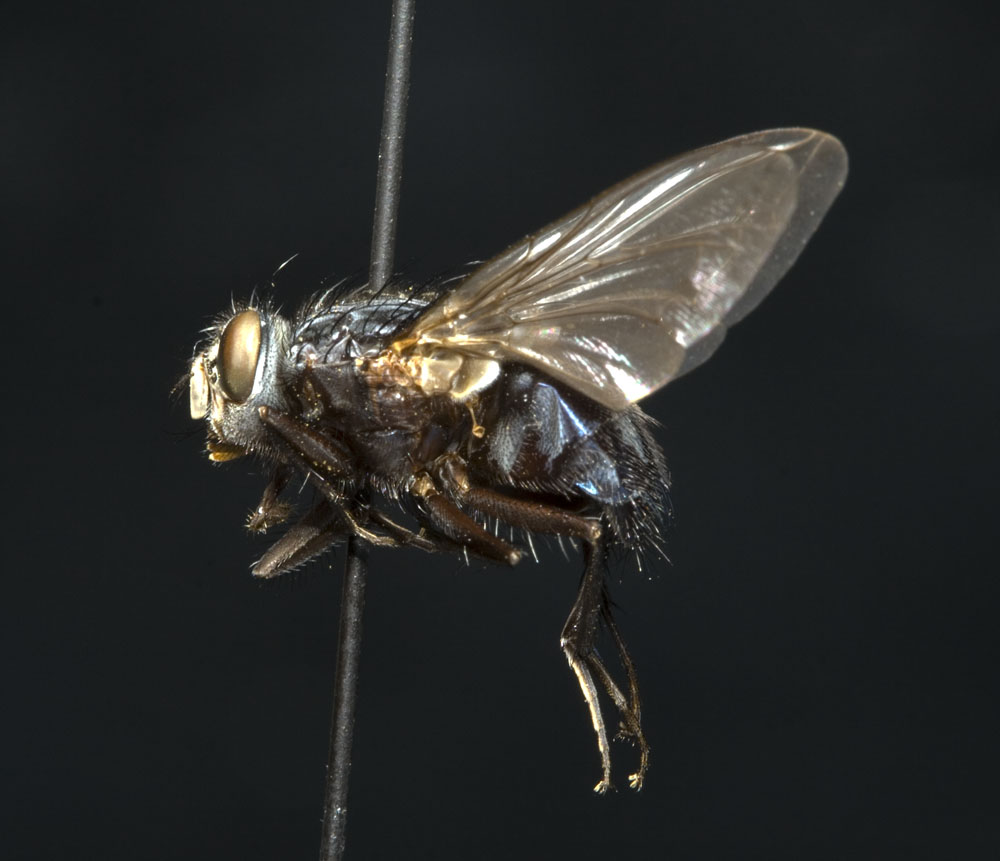
Lateral view of C. livida

=== Life cycle and reproduction ===
Blue bottle flies have a life cycle of approximately 15–36 days. The Calliphora species also have an optimal growth temperature from 18–30 °C (64–86 °F).

==== Developmental Stages ====
The egg is the first stage in the life cycle of a fly. The female extends structures called telescoping segments on her abdomen to lay eggs. C. livida eggs are identified as being less than 1.35 millimetres (0.053 in) in length, without pronounced flanges or longitudinal ridges, and with the arms of the flanges straight or slightly diverging.

The egg stage is followed by the larval stage. Calliphorid flies have three larval instars lasting 421 days in all. Larvae in the genus Calliphora can be characterized by being round in cross section, slightly raised posterior spiracles which are surrounded by 10 or more tubercles, complete peritremes, and an accessory oral sclerite. C. vicina, a close relative to C. livida, has larval growth estimated to be at 4–30 °C (39–86 °F). The minimum developmental temperature is approximately 1 °C (34 °F) and 4700 accumulated degree hours (ADH) are required for development from the moment the egg hatches to pupation.

When larvae have completed all three instars or become disturbed, they enter the pupal stage. Calliphorid flies disperse an average of 15–20 feet (4.6–6.1 m) before pupation and remain in the pupal stage for 3–20 (or more) days. The morphology of the puparia of C. livida is described as 25 globules occurring on the first abdominal segment on the bubble membrane.

==== Adult ====
Adult C. livida have a blue metallic sheen dulled by micromentum, or dense, tiny hairs. C. livida can be easily confused with C. coloradensis; C. livida is distinguished by a black genal dilation (the cheek area of the fly) as opposed to a red genal dilation as found on C. coloradensis. This characteristic is good to use for identification in fully sclerotized specimens but can be misleading in teneral flies, which are common in C. coloradensis. Blue bottle flies are around 6–14 mm (0.24–0.55 in) in length, making them appear robust. C. livida has three postsutural intra-alar setae, a characteristic shared with C. coloradensis and some C. latifrons.

=== Distribution and diet ===
C. livida is widespread over North America. These flies prefer shady locations, and tend to be found in significantly lower temperatures from 4 to 15.6 °C (39.2 to 60.1 °F). Calliphorid flies are attracted to carrion and excrement. C. livida has been shown to arrive on carrion after a delay of about 24 hours.

== Importance ==
=== Forensic science ===
Calliphora livida holds great importance to forensic entomology, which is the crossover between arthropod science and the judicial system. More importantly, C. livida plays a major role in the branch of medicocriminal forensic entomology, the use of arthropod evidence to aid in solving usually violent crimes. Flies and their larvae can be used as evidence in such cases and with proper evaluation a post-mortem interval (PMI) can be given. A post-mortem interval, or time of death, is the main way flies and larvae contribute to these cases. Flies and fly larvae are beneficial because they undergo a certain life cycle that follows particular stages within a given time, depending on the environment. Due to this knowledge, entomologists can gather specimens and evaluate, based on the life cycle and knowledge of colonization, approximately how long an individual has been dead. The family Calliphoridae is one of the most important in forensic use due to their strong attraction to flesh. They are usually the first to arrive and colonize a body. C. livida along with Phormia regina, Calliphora vomitoria, Calliphora livida, Lucilia cuprina, Lucilia sericata, Lucilia illustris, Chrysomya rufifacies, Chrysomya megacephala, Cochliomyia macellaria, and Protophormia terraenovae, Calliphora vicina and Cynomya mortuorum are common species of blow flies often used to estimate a time of death.

=== Post-mortem interval ===
Calliphora livida is important in estimating post-mortem interval because of its relatively early appearance on carrion. C. livida is normally active during the springtime, but can also be found during the colder months. However, the most important indication of the post-mortem interval is the appearance of larvae. Eggs that have been laid on the carrion by the adult blow fly hatch within a 24- to 48-hour period. These larvae then have three instars, or developmental stages, in which they grow and decompose the body. The three instars occur throughout a period of 4 to 15 days depending on the amount of calories that can be amassed by a maggot. The three instars can be differentiated by the amount of slits there are in the spiracle of the maggot. The next phase of development in C. livida is the pupa, which lasts from 3 to 13 days. The length of pupation can be determined by color changes in the pupa from light to dark.

The development of C. livida is very useful in determining post-mortem interval estimations because it is possible to determine relatively precise estimations based on a specific instar. Temperature, heat generated by the maggot mass, the type of food source, contaminants and toxins, and obstructions that thwart the oviposition of adults are all factors that can affect the rate of development of larvae, thereby effecting the estimation.

=== Medical/economic ===
While flies and larvae can be beneficial to humans through the judicial system, they can also do a lot of harm. Flies can act as a vector for carrying bacteria on or in their body and then can deposit these germs on or near humans. Members of the genus Calliphora have been found to spread a number of bacterial diseases including poliomyelitis and dysentery and can cause myiasis. Myiasis is the feeding of larvae on necrotic tissue of a living organism. C. livida has been reported to cause myiasis, but it is not common for this species. C. livida can, however, be a vector for bacterial diseases and cause human illnesses.

== Control and management ==
In 1950, a study was conducted in Savannah, Georgia on use of insecticides to control fly breeding in garbage cans. According to the study, BHC, or lindane, showed the best results for controlling the breeding of Calliphora livida. Other materials that were used in the testing were dieldrin and chlordane, where the latter was shown to be the least effective. When the study was conducted again in 1951, PDB (paradichlorobenzene) crystals were shown to be a more effective pesticide than BHC. All materials tested seemed to be more effective towards blow flies than house flies.
