= Calliphora loewi =

Scientific classification
- Kingdom: Animalia
- Phylum: Arthropoda
- Clade: Pancrustacea
- Class: Insecta
- Order: Diptera
- Family: Calliphoridae
- Genus: Calliphora
- Species: C. loewi

Binomial name
- Calliphora loewi Enderlein, 1903

Synonyms
- C. morticia Shannon, 1923, Onesia germanorum Villeneuve, 1907

Species of fly

Calliphora loewi is part of the family Calliphoridae, which consisted of bottle flies and blowflies, and in the genus Calliphora, blue bottle flies. The genus can be deceiving since C. loewi is not blue. Though this species is rare, it can play an important part in forensic entomology, spreading disease, and decomposing carrion. The life cycle of C. loewi is similar to the life cycle of the genus Calliphora. Since this species is rare there has not been much research on it.

== Description ==
Günther Enderlein, a German entomologist, first described Calliphora loewi in 1903. Calliphora loewi ranges in length from 6–14 mm. C. loewi is a rare species that can be confused with C. terraenovae because some species have a similar reddish genal groove. The head is typically a black color with the exception of the lower facial edge. The posterior of the head is concave with 3 to 5 rows of black setae, centrally with pale hairs. The frontal area of the males head is narrower than the females. The cerci in the males are long and narrow. Males also have bordering frontal orbital plates, whereas the females have frontal vita about three times the width of the frontal orbital plates. The females have very large antennae compared to normal sized antennae in males.

== Food source ==
The maggots have hook-like mouth parts that tear apart the tissues where they live. The adults have sponge-like mouth parts in which they will first coat their food with digestive enzymes and then suck up the matter. C. loewi primarily feeds on dead animals but can be occasionally found on vegetation.

== Distribution ==
Calliphora loewi is a very rare species but can be found in all parts of the world. C. loewi is widespread in Fennoscandia and Denmark and can be found limited in numbers in other parts of northern and central Europe. Specimens have been found as far east as Mongolia and Japan. The only recorded findings of the species in North America were in Alaska and Canada. C. loewi is also thought to avoid human settlements.

== Life cycle ==
The life cycle of C. loewi has six stages: the egg, three larval stages (instars), pupae, and adult fly. The adults will lay their eggs in suitable habitats, usually carrion. Larvae will hatch within 6–48 hours after eggs have been deposited. They shed their skins three times during their larval stage. The time it takes to molt into the next instar is fairly consistent; however, temperature can be a factor. Colder weather will slow down the amount of time it takes for each developmental stage, and warmer weather will speed it up. The life cycle from egg to adult can be anywhere from 16–35 days, depending on environmental conditions.

=== Eggs to Larvae ===
The eggs of this genus are white, slightly curved, cylinder shaped and have blunt ends. Once the eggs hatch the larva stage begins. The three instars of the maggots have different characteristics. The first is less than 2 mm long and is a twelve segment skeleton with mouthparts present. The second instar has spines located on the dorsal side and has two posterior spiracle slits from which it breathes. During the third instar, the mouthparts are fully developed. The mouth-hook tooth becomes longer, and the maggot now has three posterior spiracles.

=== Larvae to Pupae ===
When the third-instar larva has finished growing (12–18 mm), it leaves the corpse and burrows into the ground where it develops into a hardened, capsule-like pupa. The brown/black pupa retains a maggot like appearance with outlines of its spiracles and skin, except now it is sclerotized. While encased as a pupa, it is unable to feed and is immobile.

=== Pupae to Adult ===
It takes around 14 days (at a temperature of 70 degrees Fahrenheit) before the pupa emerges as an adult fly. The newly adult fly is pale in color with a soft body and wings. As it matures, the fly expands its wings, and the body hardens and changes color. A mature C. loewi is approximately 6–14 mm in length. The fly then mates and will travel several miles to lay its eggs, and the cycle repeats.

== Importance ==
=== Forensic ===
Forensic entomology is the study of arthropods and their connection to the courts of law. The family Calliphoridae is very important in forensic entomology. The genus Calliphora also has a very distinct life cycle so based on the different stages that can be found on a corpse; therefore an accurate post mortem interval can be determined.

Upon finding blowflies and or their larvae on a corpse, it is extremely important to accurately identify the correct species. For example, a semi- rounded sclerite lying behind the mouth-hook of blowfly larvae exists only in C. loewi and C. vomitoria. Since both of these species of Calliphoridae tend to be found in rural areas, an entomologist can use these characteristics to determine a region or habitat where the victim died.

Entomologists can use SDF (spiracle distance factor) values when identifying between Calliphora sp. SDF is calculated by dividing the distance between the spiracles by the greatest diameter of one spiracle. Since the greatest diameter of one spiracle tends to remain constant for each species, SDF values are very useful. To tell the difference between C. loewi and C. vomitoria, the SDF for C. vomitoria decreases (the spiracles come closer together) when the puparium transitions between the 2nd and 3rd instars. The SDF for C. loewi however remains constant (the spiracles maintain their distance between).

=== Medical ===
In the epidemiological sense, blowflies are of concern due to being possible mechanical vectors of disease. Blowfly breeding and feeding hosts tend to be decomposing animals and dung, which are covered with bacteria that consequentially come in contact with the fly. Lab studies have shown that blowflies coming in contact with agar have produced cultures that contain pathogens. Although C. loewi does breed in carrion and possibly in human feces, it remains uncertain whether it carries or transmits disease.

=== Ecological ===
They are also very important ecologically because they are decomposers. Blowflies are attracted not only to decomposing hosts but also to some plants. C. loewi and other blowflies have been observed to be attracted to Phallus impudicus, the stinkhorn fungus, which tends to smell like carrion. The Stapelia flower, which smells like carrion and emits heat like that of decomposition, also attracts blowflies. The flower causes females to oviposit (deposit eggs from ovipositor) but it does not support past the 1st instars. Some other plants do support larvae through full development.

== Research ==
Research has been performed using synthetic trap baits instead of carcasses to capture blowflies. In a field test, dimethyl trisulfide was used in trap baits and C. loewi and other various blowflies were caught in these traps. Blowflies are attracted to decaying hosts due to the odors produced by bacterial decomposition. Dimethyl trisulphide is probably a decomposition product from bacterial decomposition and a major attractant for blowflies looking for hosts. Dimethyl disulfide has also been used in trap baits and for the suppression of other Calliphora sp.

Future research about the behavior of C. loewi will provide more information to gain a better picture of the lifecycle which will allow investigators to better estimate the time of colonization and PMI. For medicinal purposes, the possibility that the larvae can be used in maggot therapy is currently unknown and also can be researched.
