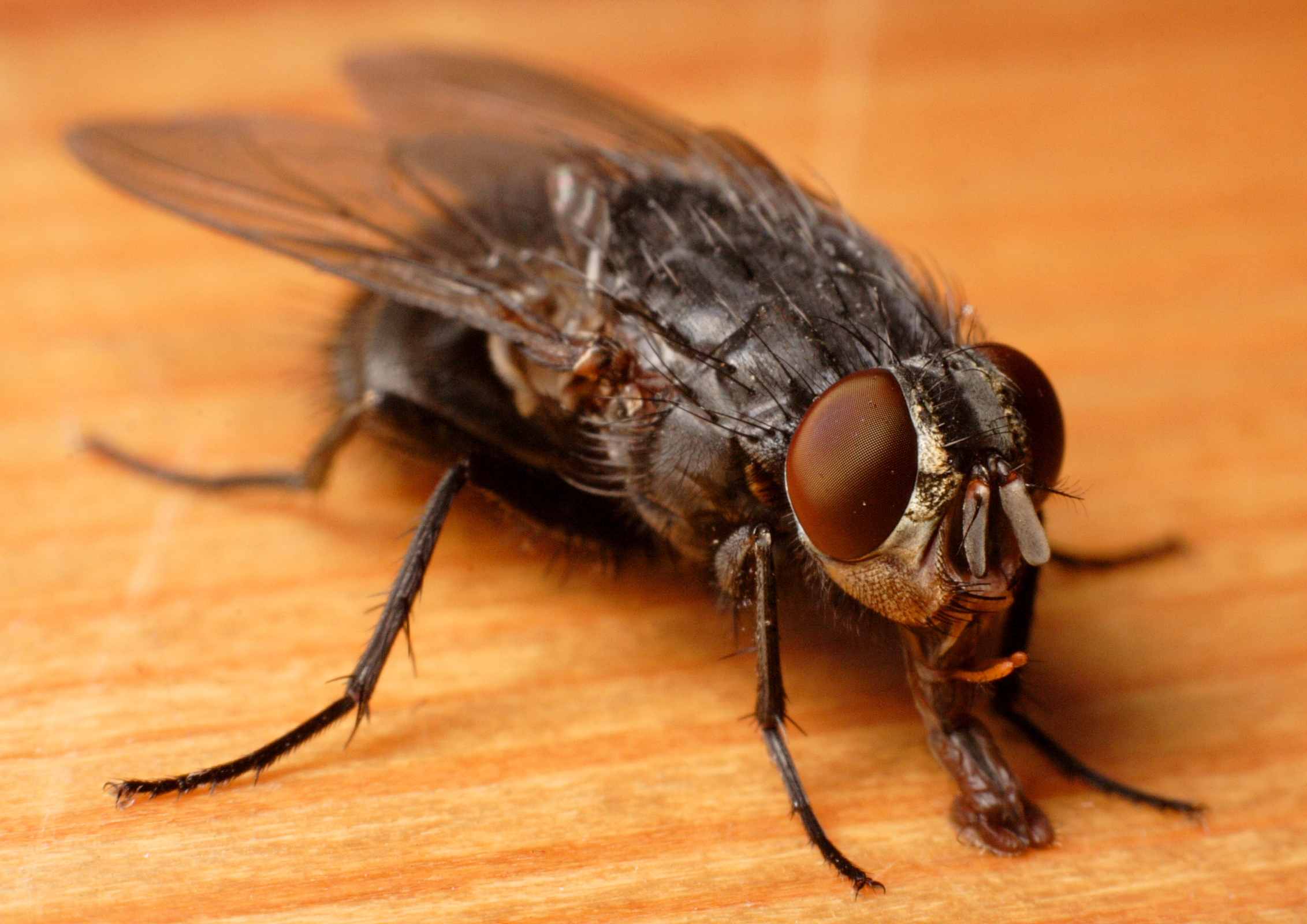
- Calliphora vicina

Scientific classification
- Kingdom: Animalia
- Phylum: Arthropoda
- Clade: Pancrustacea
- Class: Insecta
- Order: Diptera
- Family: Calliphoridae
- Subfamily: Calliphorinae
- Tribe: Calliphorini
- Genus: Calliphora; Robineau-Desvoidy, 1830

Type species
- Musca vomitoria Linnaeus, 1758

Synonyms
- Abago Grunin, 1966; Acronesia Hall, 1948; Acrophaga Brauer & von Bergenstamm, 1891

= Calliphora =

Genus of flies

Calliphora is a genus of blow flies, also known as bottle flies, found in most parts of the world, with the highest diversity in Australia. The most widespread species in North America are Calliphora livida, C. vicina, and C. vomitoria.

Calliphora, meaning "bearer of beauty", was first formally named in 1830 by Jean-Baptiste Robineau-Desvoidy. It is the type genus of the family Calliphoridae.

== Description ==
Adults of Calliphora have a grey or black thorax, the colour dulled by a heavy microtomentum. The abdomen is metallic blue (rarely purple or green) and sometimes also dulled by microtomentum. The suprasquamal ridge is bare or with inconspicuous fine setae only. The first flagellomere of the antenna is more than twice the length of the pedicel.

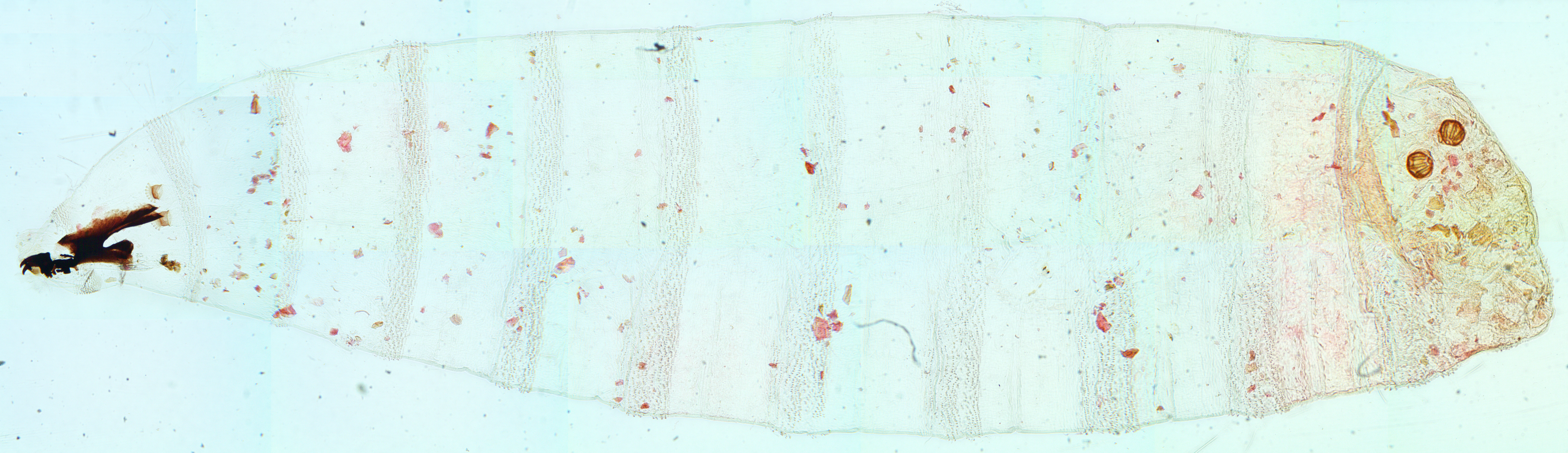
Larvae exoskeleton of Calliphora erythrocephala. The two posterior spiracles are to the right. Darker mouth hooks are to the left. The larva is stretched out on the microscope slide to about 16.5mm long,

Larvae have two posterior spiracles with a thick and unbroken peritreme, and (like other Calliphoridae larvae) containing straight slits. There is an accessory sclerite between the mouth hooks, though this is not visible in whole larvae.

== Species ==
Species in the genus Calliphora include:

- Calliphora algira Macquart, 1843
- Calliphora alpina (Zetterstedt), 1845
- Calliphora antennatis Hutton, 1881
- Calliphora antipodes Hutton, 1902
- Calliphora antojuanaee Mariluis, 1982
- Calliphora aruspex Bezzi, 1927
- Calliphora assimilis Malloch, 1927
- Calliphora atripalpis Malloch, 1935
- Calliphora augur (Fabricius), 1775
- Calliphora auriventris Malloch, 1927
- Calliphora australica Malloch, 1927
- Calliphora axata Séguy, 1946
- Calliphora bezzi Zumpt, 1956
- Calliphora bryani Kurahashi, 1972
- Calliphora calcedoniae Mariluis, 1979
- Calliphora canimicans Hardy, 1930
- Calliphora centralis Malloch, 1927
- Calliphora chinghaiensis Van & Ma, 1978
- Calliphora clarki Malloch, 1927
- Calliphora clausa Macquart 1848
- Calliphora clementei Iches, 1906
- Calliphora coloradensis Hough, 1899
- Calliphora croceipalpis Jaennicke, 1867
- Calliphora dasyophthalma Villeneuve, 1927
- Calliphora deflexa Hardy, 1932
- Calliphora dichromata (Bigot)
- Calliphora dispar Macquart, 1846
- Calliphora dubia
- Calliphora echinosa Grunin, 1970
- Calliphora elliptica Macquart, 1847
- Calliphora erectiseta Fan, 1957
- Calliphora erythrocephala Lowne, 1895
- Calliphora espiritusanta Kurahashi, 1971
- Calliphora eudypti Hutton, 1902
- Calliphora fulviceps Lamb, 1909
- Calliphora fulvicoxa Hardy, 1930
- Calliphora fuscofemorata Malloch, 1927
- Calliphora flavicauda Malloch, 1925
- Calliphora floccosa Wulp, 1884
- Calliphora forresti Norris, 1994
- Calliphora franzi Zumpt, 1956
- Calliphora fuscipennis Jaennicke, 1867
- Calliphora genarum Zetterstedt, 1838
- Calliphora gilesi Norris, 1994
- Calliphora grahami Aldrich, 1930
- Calliphora gressitti Kurahashi, 1971
- Calliphora grisescens Villeneuve, 1933
- Calliphora grunini Schumann & Ozerov, 1992
- Calliphora hasanuddini Kurahashi & Selomo, 1997
- Calliphora hilli Patton, 1925
- Calliphora icela (Walker)
- Calliphora insignis Curran, 1938
- Calliphora io Zumpt, 1956
- Calliphora irazuana Townsend, 1908
- Calliphora javanica de Meijere, 1914
- Calliphora kanoi Kurahashi, 1986
- Calliphora kermadeca Kurahashi, 1971
- Calliphora lata Coquillett, 1898
- Calliphora latifrons Hough, 1899
- Calliphora leucosticta Bezzi, 1927
- Calliphora livida Hall, 1948
- Calliphora loewi Enderlein, 1903
- Calliphora lopesi Mello, 1962
- Calliphora lordhowensis Kurahashi, 1987
- Calliphora macleayi Malloch, 1927
- Calliphora maestrica Peris, Gonzalez-Mora & Fernandez, 1998
- Calliphora majuscula Villeneuve, 1915
- Calliphora malayana Malloch, 1927
- Calliphora maritima Norris, 1994
- Calliphora maryfullerae Hardy
- Calliphora melinda Curran, 1929
- Calliphora metallica Malloch, 1927
- Calliphora minor Malloch, 1927
- Calliphora mogii Kurahashi & Selomo, 1998
- Calliphora morticia Shannon, 1923
- Calliphora mumfordi Malloch, 1932
- Calliphora neohortonaa Miller, 1939
- Calliphora neozelandica Murray, 1954
- Calliphora nigribarbis Vollenhoven, 1863
- Calliphora nociva Hardy – lesser brown blowfly (western)
- Calliphora norfolka Kurahashi, 1971
- Calliphora nothocalliphoralis Miller, 1939
- Calliphora noumea Curran, 1929
- Calliphora ochracea Schiner, 1868
- Calliphora onesiodes Kurahashi, 1971
- Calliphora papua Guerin-Vollenhoven, 1831
- Calliphora papuensis Kurahashi, 1971
- Calliphora pattoni Aubertin, 1931
- Calliphora perida Hardy, 1937
- Calliphora peruviana Robineau-Desvoidy, 1830
- Calliphora phacoptera Wulp, 1882
- Calliphora plebeia Malloch, 1927
- Calliphora popoffana Townsend, 1908
- Calliphora porphyrina Kurahashi, 1971
- Calliphora praepes Giglio-Tos, 1893
- Calliphora prosternalis Malloch, 1934
- Calliphora psudovomitoria Kurahashi, 1971
- Calliphora pubescens Macquart, 1851
- Calliphora quadrimaculata (Swederus, 1787)
- Calliphora robusta Malloch, 1927
- Calliphora rohdendorfi (Grunin, 1966)
- Calliphora rostrata Robineau-Desvoidy, 1830
- Calliphora rufipes Kurahashi
- Calliphora salviaga Bezzi
- Calliphora simulata Malloch, 1932
- Calliphora sternalis Malloch
- Calliphora stygia (Fabricius, 1781) – common brown blowfly
- Calliphora subalpina (Ringdahl, 1931)
- Calliphora tasmaniae Kurahashi
- Calliphora terranovae Macquart, 1851
- Calliphora toxopeusi Theowald, 1957
- Calliphora uralensis Villeneuve, 1922
- Calliphora varifrons Malloch, 1932
- Calliphora vicina Robineau-Desvoidy, 1830 – blue bottle fly
- Calliphora viridescens Robineau-Desvoidy, 1830
- Calliphora viridiventris (Malloch)
- Calliphora vomitoria (Linnaeus, 1758) – blue bottle fly
- Calliphora xanthura Bigot
- Calliphora yezoana Matsumara
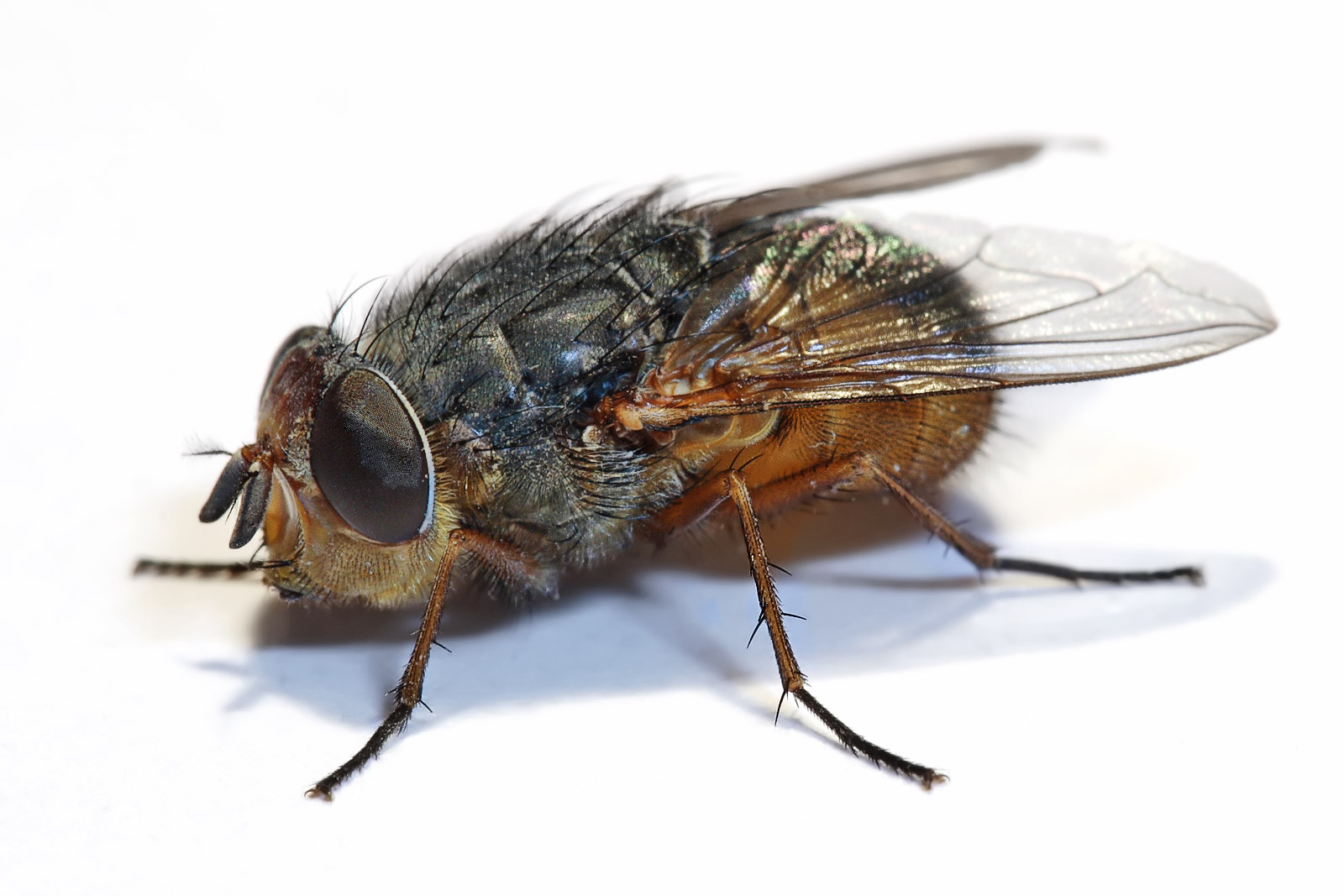
Calliphora augur

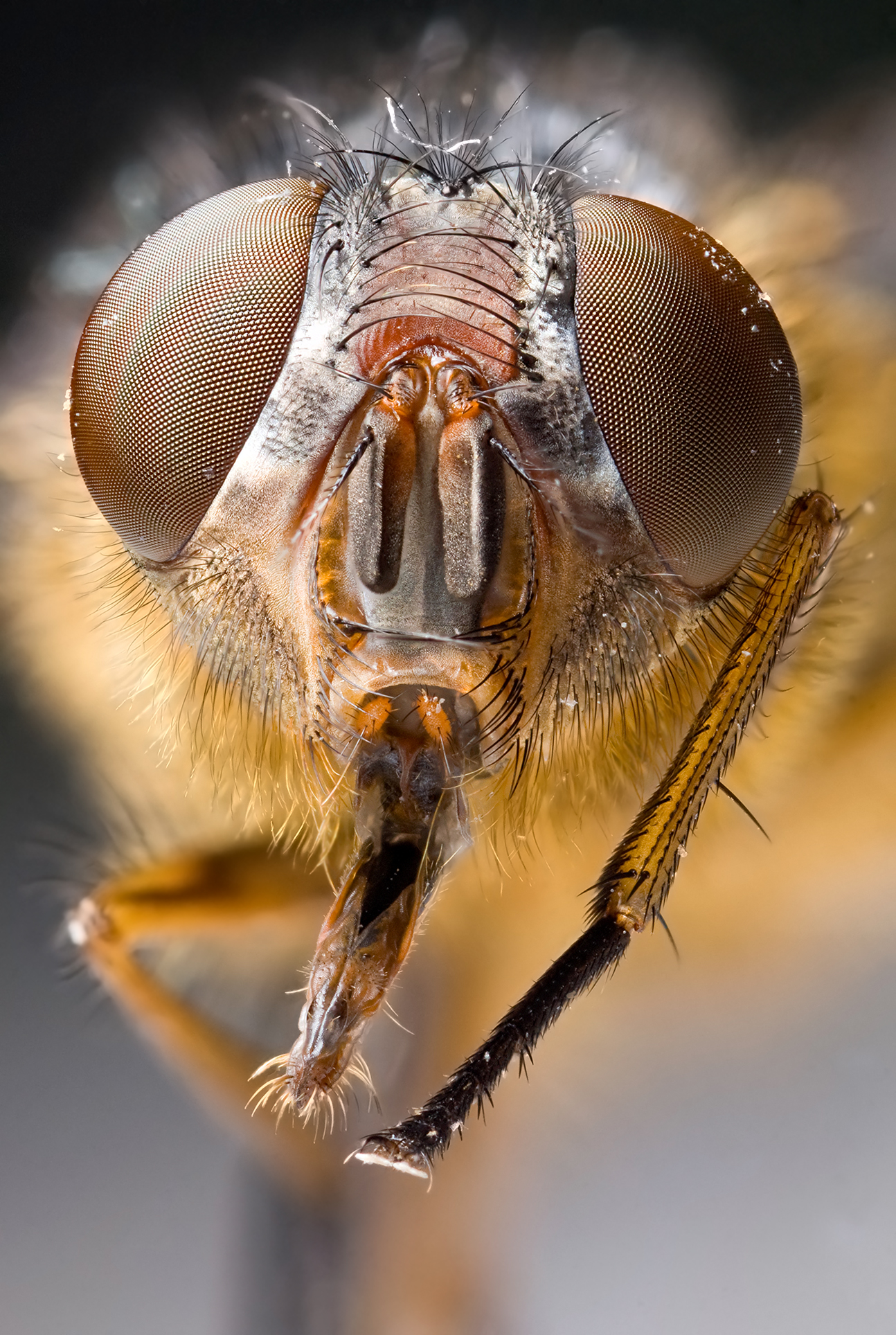
Calliphora hilli

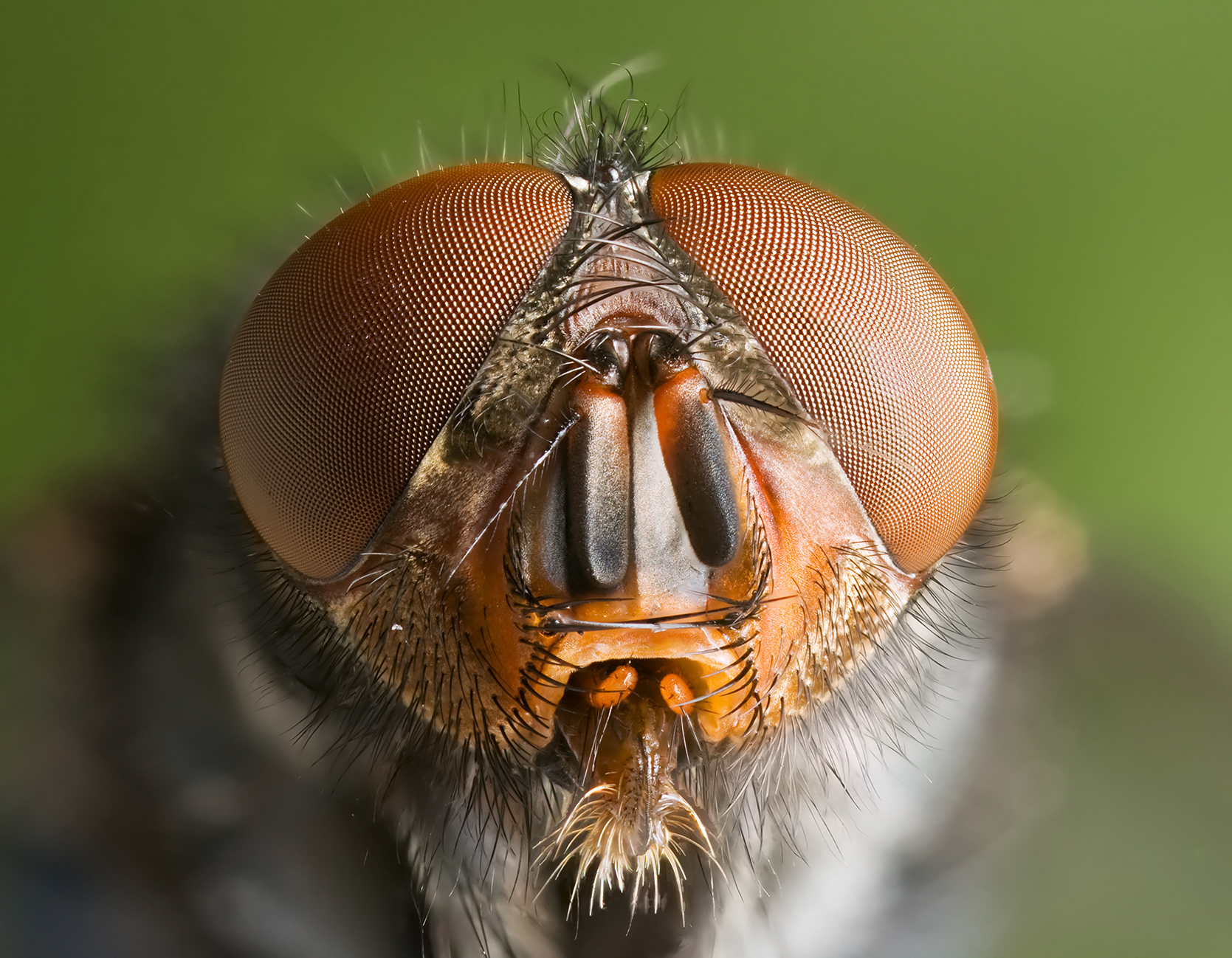
Calliphora vomitoria
