= Calliphora latifrons =

Scientific classification
- Kingdom: Animalia
- Phylum: Arthropoda
- Clade: Pancrustacea
- Class: Insecta
- Order: Diptera
- Family: Calliphoridae
- Genus: Calliphora
- Species: C. latifrons

Binomial name
- Calliphora latifrons Hough, 1899

Species of fly

Calliphora latifrons is a species of blue bottle fly.

This fly adheres to a particular environment and ecosystem that has limited geographic distributions in North America. Undisturbed, this environment fosters C. latifrons unique life cycle that somewhat differs from related blow flies. This life cycle can be utilized as a tool for forensic applications such as postmortem interval determination.

== Identification ==
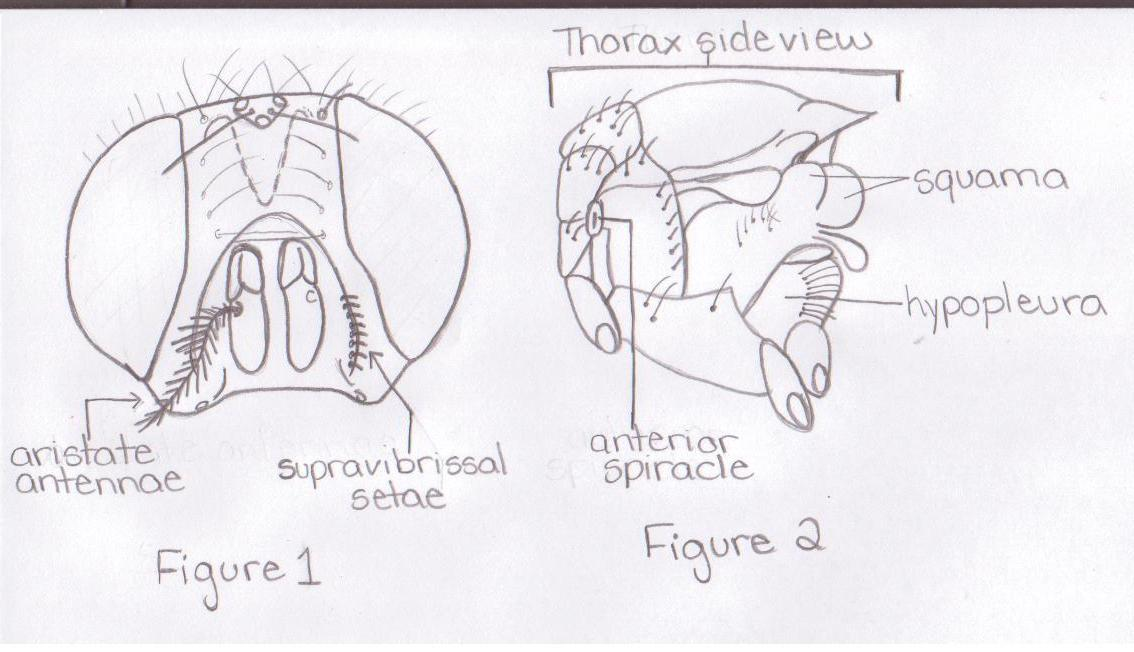
Frontal face and lateral thorax

Calliphora latifrons can be distinguished from related species by the following set of characters:

- Presutral intra-alar seta present; anterior thoracic spiracle usually with brown setae; abdomen usually metallic bluish with or without white micromentum
- An orange anterior spiracle
- Squama brown, margin often white; frons of male narrower, at narrowest, usually 0.14× head width or less; usually not restricted to northern or high elevation areas
- Facial ridge with row of short, stout, supravibrissal setae, ascending from the vibrissae to a point almost halfway to antennal base; a second set of strong divergent ocellar setae about 2/3 the length of the anterior ocellar setae, surrounded by only a few sparse setae. Male genitalia shorter, with a chisel-shaped point. Frons of male broad, at narrowest, almost twice the width of parafacial at lunule, frons .24/12 head width; female frons .37/8 head width

== Life cycle ==
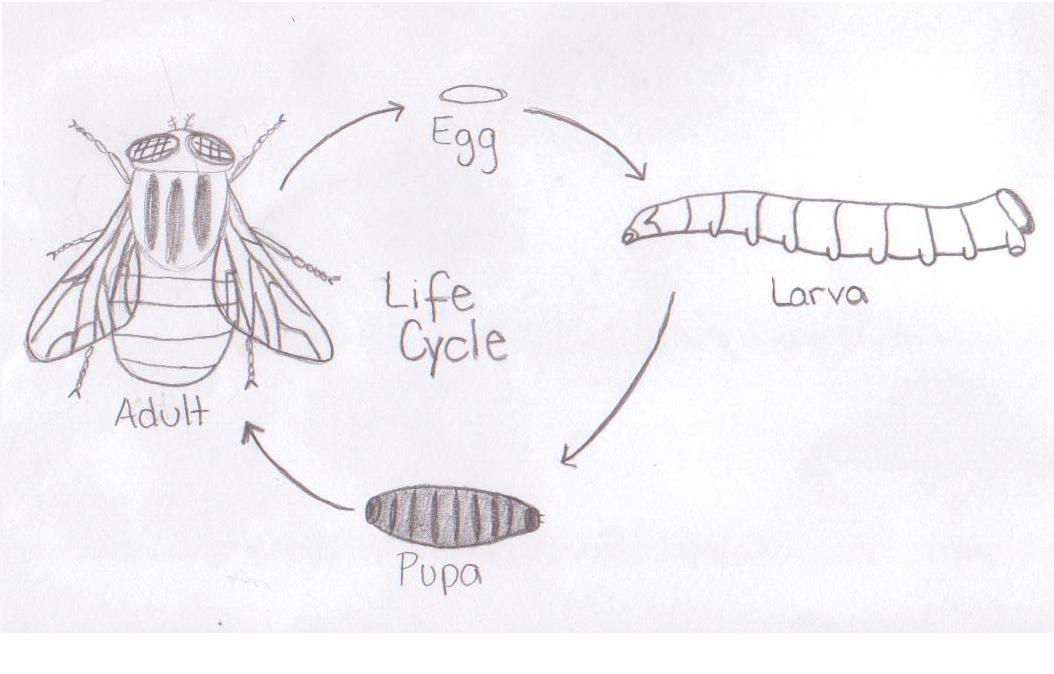
Life cycle of C. latifrons

The life cycle of Calliphora latifrons is similar to many other domestic flies, and is dependent on temperature. The eggs, which are yellowish or white in color, are deposited by the female into mostly moist, solid organic matter and are approximately 0.04 in long. The egg hatches after about 27 hours, and is prone to desiccation.

The eggs hatch into a larva, or maggot, which passes through three instars. The legless maggots are 0.5–0.75 inches (13–19 mm). Each instar stage is divided by a molt. Entomologists are able to determine the instar stages by inspecting the posterior spiracles of the larvae. The first instar lasts around 22 hours, the second 14 hours, and the third instar, which is the longest, lasts 36 hours. After the third instar, the larvae tend to move towards drier areas and burrow into hiding to pupate. In between the third instar and the pupa stage, there is an intermediate stage known as the prepupa. The prepupa lasts about 92 hours for C. latifrons.

The third stage of the life cycle is known as the pupa stage, and is very similar in susceptibility to the egg stage. This pupa stage tends to last 6 days, and is characterized by its hard, brown casing, whereabouts the larva transitions to the adult stage. The total immature time for these flies is 13 days.

== Importance in forensic entomology ==
Calliphora latifrons is one of the most forensically important species of blow flies.

Urban entomology deals with the insects that affect humans and their immediate environment. This field includes a variety of problems for humans such as pest control issues and disease. C. latifrons is known to freely enter houses. There have been several cases where the flies enter homes and breed in the bodies of dead mice, resulting in larger amounts of flies. C. latifrons is also known for being a potential vector for disease. By ovipositing on their food as they feed the flies have the ability to transfer various pathogens.

Medicocriminal entomology deals with the carrion feeding insects that infest human remains. This area relies on correctly identifying arthropod species, approximating the age of the insects to determine the initial colonization and comparing that information with known arrival patterns of the adult species. After identifying the insect(s) on the body, a time of death can be calculated, however, a forensic entomologist can never calculate an exact time of death, but rather a time span that tells them when that body was available for colonization. All this information gives investigators an estimation of a portion of the post mortem interval (PMI). C. latifrons usually breeds in small carcasses in rural areas. In only a few cases has it been found on human corpses. In February 2004, there was a case involving a dumped body in a rural area of San Jose, California. C. latifrons was found on a decaying corpse and helped investigators confirm how long the body had been there. C. latifrons is part of a group of carrion feeding flies in the western U.S. in which very little information exists.
