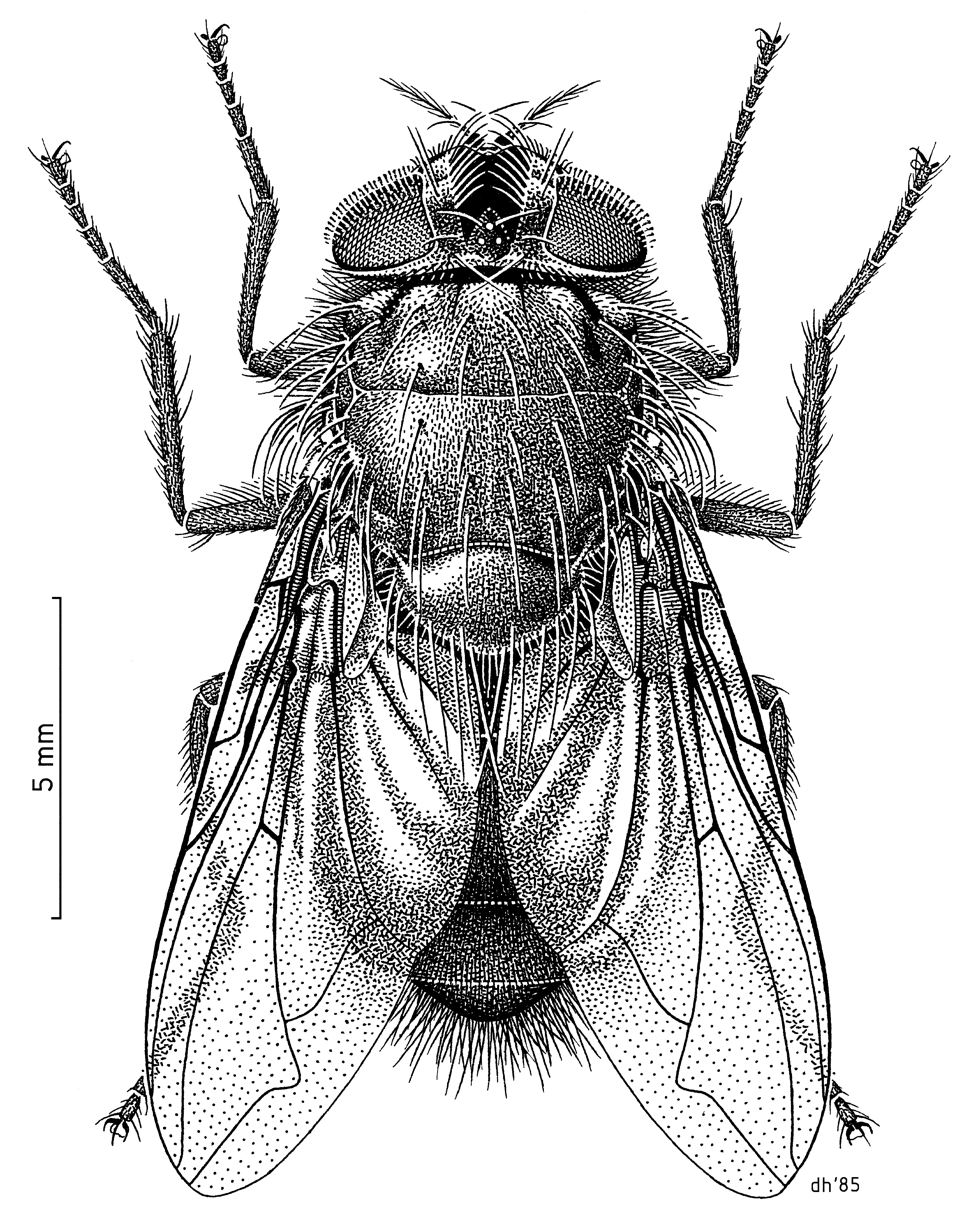
- Female Calliphora quadrimaculata illustration by Des Helmore

Scientific classification
- Kingdom: Animalia
- Phylum: Arthropoda
- Clade: Pancrustacea
- Class: Insecta
- Order: Diptera
- Family: Calliphoridae
- Genus: Calliphora
- Species: C. quadrimaculata

Binomial name
- Calliphora quadrimaculata (Swederus, 1787)

Synonyms
- Musca quadrimaculata Swederus, 1787

= Calliphora quadrimaculata =

Species of fly

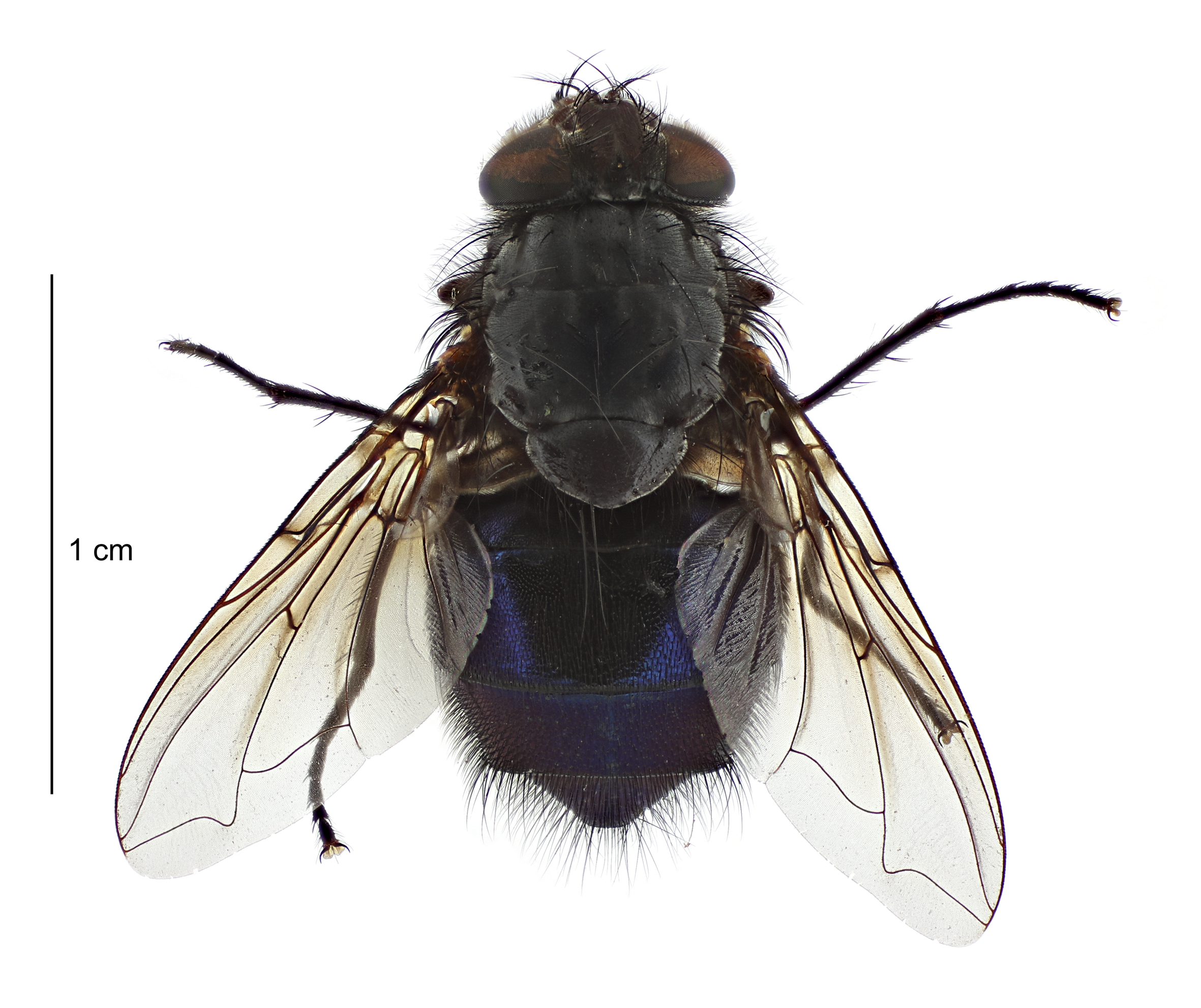
Calliphora quadrimaculata

Calliphora quadrimaculata, commonly known as the New Zealand blue blowfly and by its Māori name rango pango, is a fly in the family Calliphoridae. This particular blowfly is found throughout Aotearoa New Zealand as well as on Chatham, Auckland, Stewart and Campbell Islands that surround it. Generally blowfly maggots in New Zealand have to feed on animal tissue or faeces to develop into adult blowflies. However the New Zealand blue blowfly larvae can survive on decaying leaves of snow tussock in alpine regions and reach adult maturity without feeding on any animal tissue.

== Description ==
=== Immature morphology ===
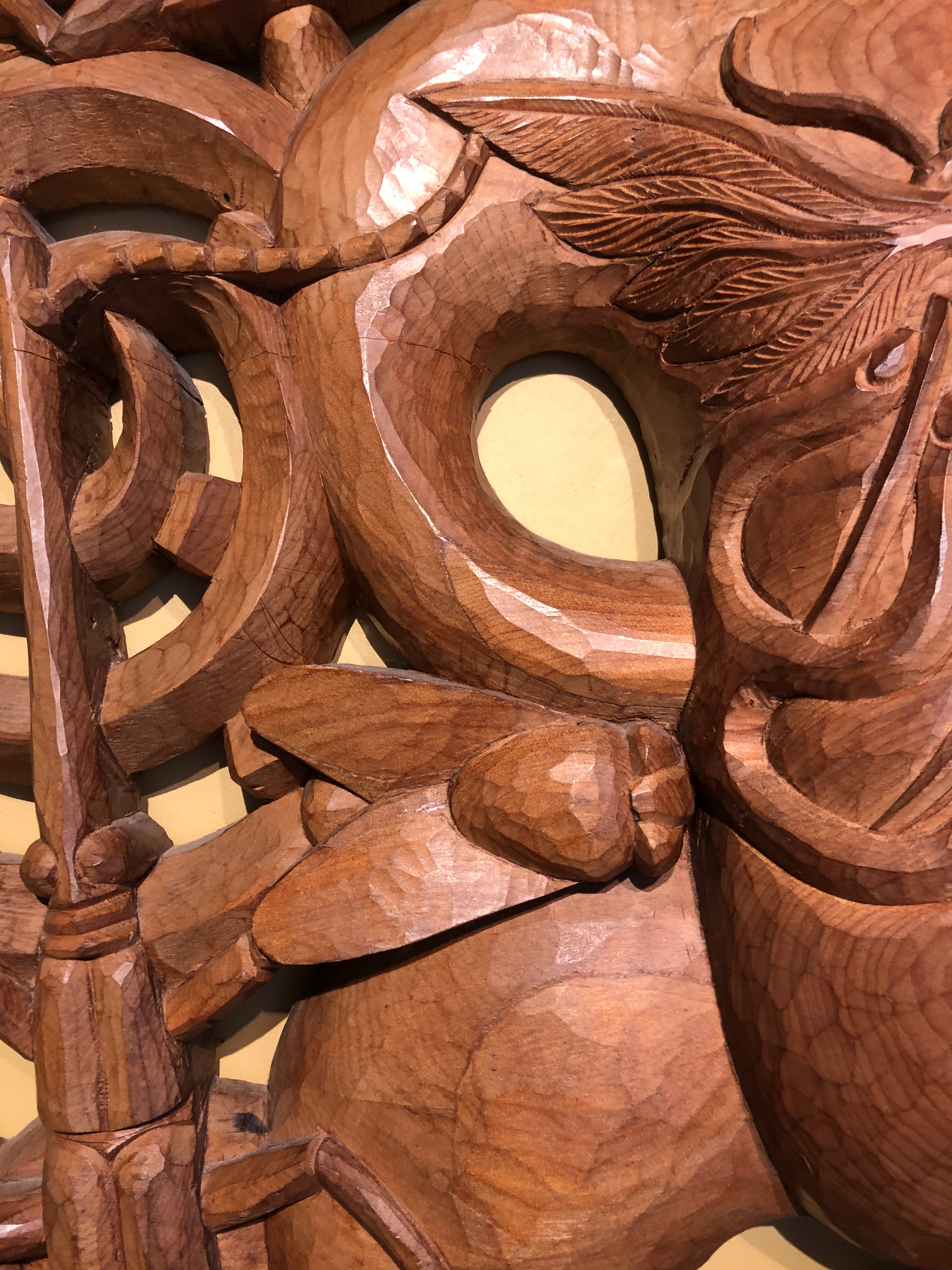
Blue blowfly carved on pare on display at the New Zealand Arthropod Collection at Landcare Research, Auckland

The blue blowfly larvae are made up of a head, three thoracic segments and eight abdominal segments. The head is often so small it is hidden in the thoracic segment, and it has two lobes, a pair of antennae and also a pair of maxillary palps (bristle-like hairs attached to the mouthparts) that serve as an additional sensory structure. The mouth is situated at the lower front part of the head and has a pair of hardened mouth hooks. The oral sclerite in Calliphora quadrimaculata is short compared to other species in the same family. On the first thoracic segment is a pair of spiracles and the rest of the body segments are separated by narrow spines which are very large in this species. This is seen as a key identifying feature in the larval stage.

=== Mature morphology ===
The adult New Zealand blue blowfly is New Zealand's largest native blowfly with body lengths of 9.5–15.0 mm. It has a head, thorax and abdomen, and a pair of wings. The head is holoptic in males, meaning that the eyes meet on the mid front line of the head. In females the head is dichoptic. Eyes are densely hairy in both males and females. The thorax has very large orange spiracles (holes that serve as the insect's respiratory system). The thorax is mostly black except on the scutellum which is a brownish colour. The mesonotum of the thorax are evenly grey dusted. The bases of the wings are darkened with a brown tinge and the veins are brown. The femoral parts of the legs are blackish brown with a thin grey dusting and the tibiae are a reddish brown. The abdomen is black with no dusting, and has violet or blue-green iridescence.

== Distribution ==
The New Zealand blue blowfly is endemic to New Zealand. It is found throughout mainland New Zealand as well as on Chatham, Auckland, Stewart and Campbell Islands that surround New Zealand. The specimens found on Auckland and Campbell Islands differed slightly from the mainland species by having a blue green metallic sheen instead of a violet metallic sheen on the abdomen.

=== Habitat preferences ===
This species is found throughout New Zealand, although it does have a preference for alpine areas where snow tussock is present, in particular in the South Island mountain ranges and Stewart Island. It is also known to be a species that contributes to fly strike in sheep. While it is not a species that initiates fly-strike, it can be a secondary candidate so may be found on farmland areas as well. This particular species is hardly ever found indoors.

== Life cycle and phenology ==
New Zealand blowflies have a relatively short life cycle. The female deposits her eggs in a decaying medium, which for this blowfly species can include decaying leaf matter as well as decaying carcasses. After 24 hours the eggs hatch into larvae; there are three growth stages of larval development and during this period the larvae feed on either plant or animal tissues. After a period of eight days the larva stops feeding and is ready to develop into a pupa underground; this occurs approximately 3 cm into the soil where conditions are dry, either where the larvae were feeding or a close distance away. The larvae empty what contents they have in their stomachs and contract to form pupae. Approximately two weeks after pupa development an adult fly is formed that is ready to mate. Female blowflies have a pre-egg laying period of 4–7 days and only live for approximately 2–3 weeks; in this time around 600–800 eggs are deposited, in total the entire cycle is about 20–25 days in length from egg to egg. The New Zealand blue blowfly predominately mates over the summer months, in particular February, because it relies on warmer temperatures for egg-to-adult development.

== Diet and foraging ==
New Zealand blue blowflies feed mostly on decaying carcasses and decaying plant tissues. This species of blowfly is also known to pollinate species of hebe in alpine regions, so nectar from the flowers may be another source of diet.

== Predators, parasites, and diseases ==
Calliphora quadimaculata have several different predators that include fish, spiders, frogs, other bigger insects, and birds. There was no sufficient evidence found of parasites or diseases affecting the New Zealand blowfly, but they are known to be vectors for human diseases such as dysentery and can transfer bacterial infections from animals to humans. Furthermore, while C. quadrimaculata is not the primary cause of myiasis (other blowflies are), it can be a secondary source.

== Forensics ==
In terms of crime scene investigations a blowfly has the ability to get into dead buried corpses under the ground. Blowflies can create useful evidence during postmortem intervals of crimes, especially at murder investigations. Forensic investigators look to find decay that has induced blowflies to the corpse. Blowflies can only live in a certain temperature, so forensic scientists can use the temperature as a measure on and around the body to use for evidence or judgement with murder cases.
