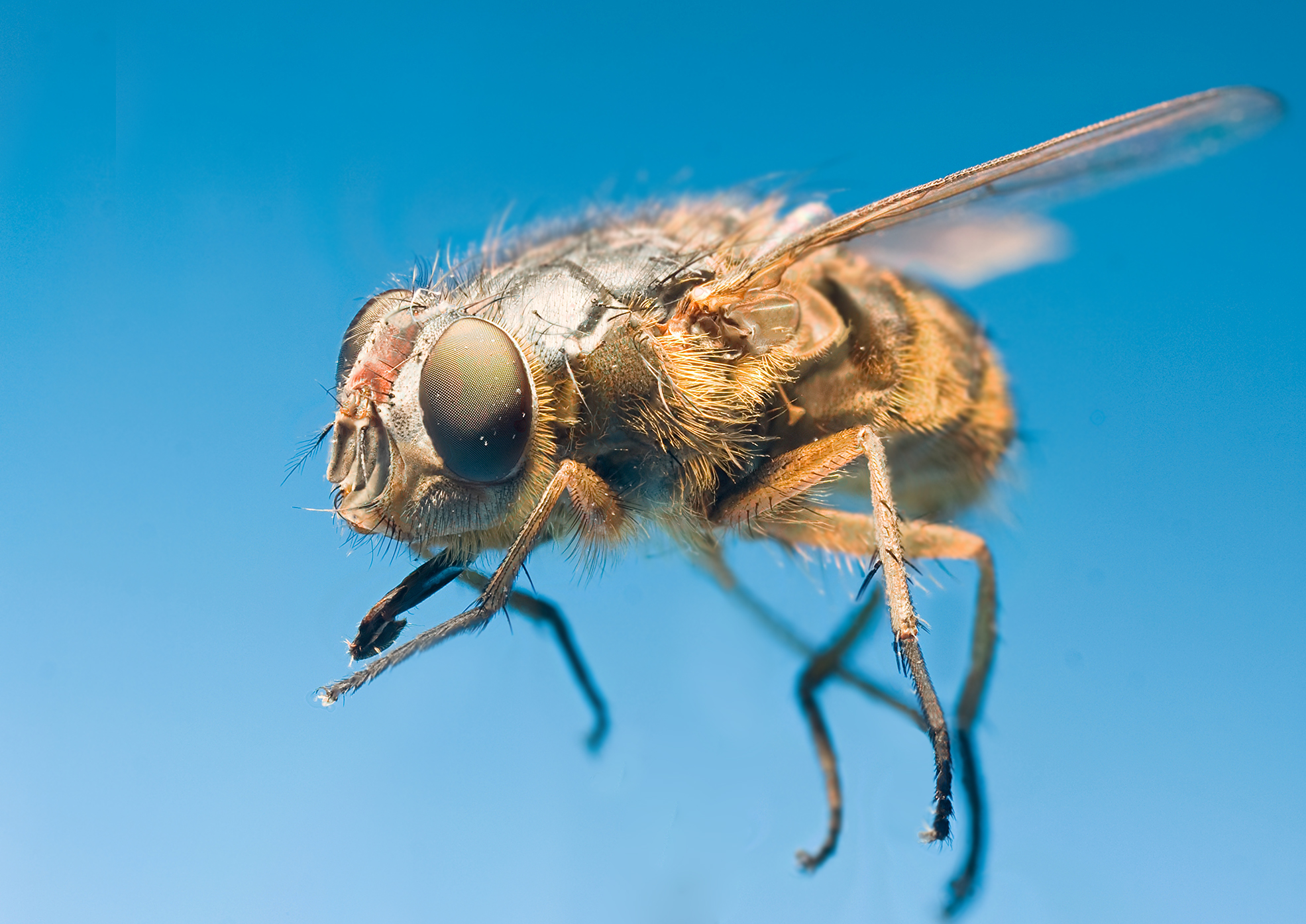
- Calliphora hilli

Scientific classification
- Kingdom: Animalia
- Phylum: Arthropoda
- Clade: Pancrustacea
- Class: Insecta
- Order: Diptera
- Family: Calliphoridae
- Subfamily: Calliphorinae

Type genus
- Calliphora

Genera
- Many, see text

= Calliphorinae =

Subfamily of flies

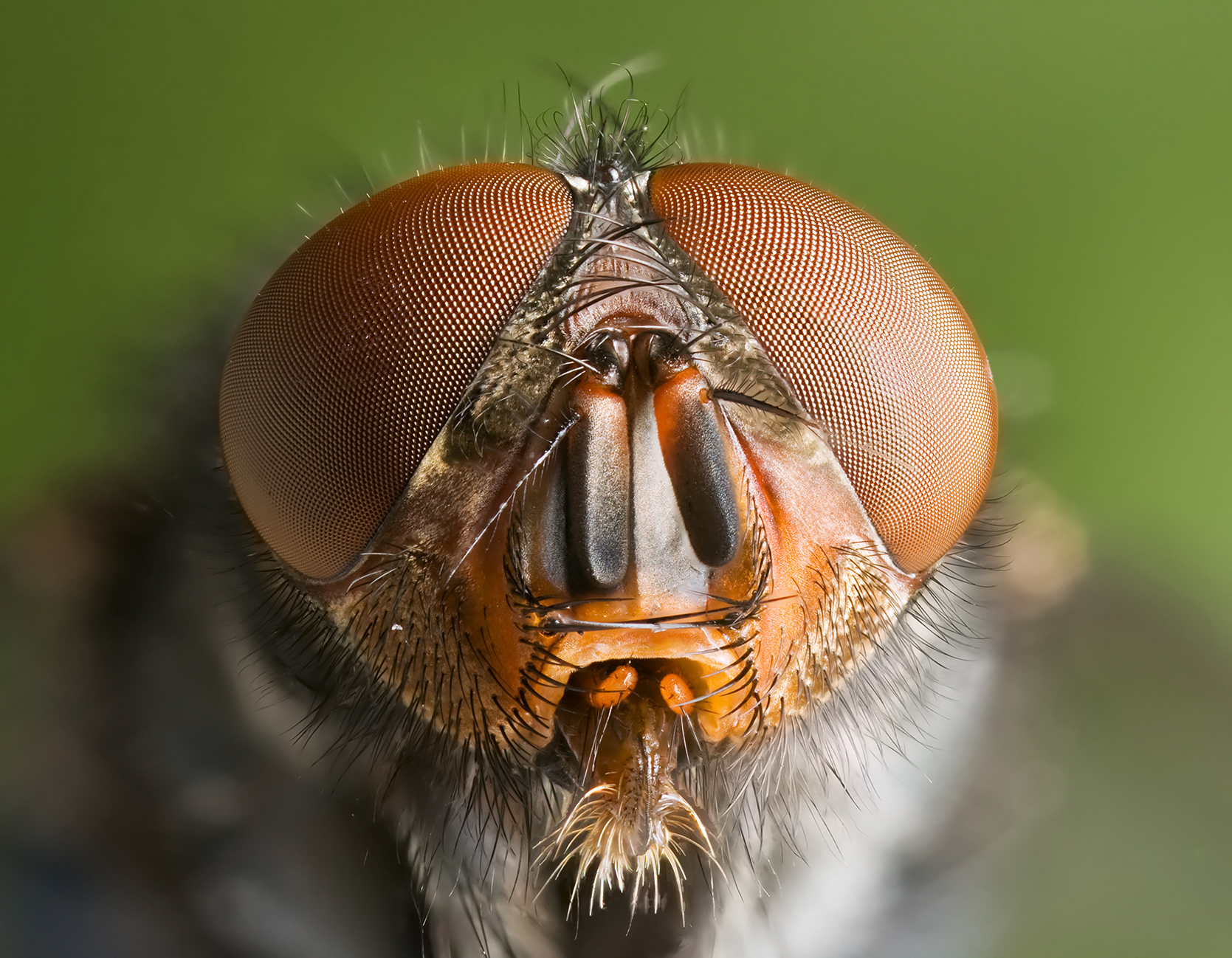
Portrait of Calliphora vomitoria

The Calliphorinae are a subfamily of the blow fly family Calliphoridae. The distinguishing characteristics of this subfamily are: the stem vein is bare, the lower calypter and the proepisternal depression are bristly, but the suprasquamal region is bare or with only a few random bristles. The thorax is dull and bears fine hairs, and the abdomen is usually colored shining blue.

The Bengaliinae (which have more yellowish and dull abdomens) have sometimes been included herein, as have the Luciliinae and Polleniinae in older treatments. These are all considered separate lineages in recent works, with Polleniinae treated as a family, Polleniidae.

== Selected genera ==
- Acronesia
- Acrophaga
- Aldrichina
- Bellardia
- Calliphora
- Cynomya
- Cyanus
- Eucalliphora
- Onesia
