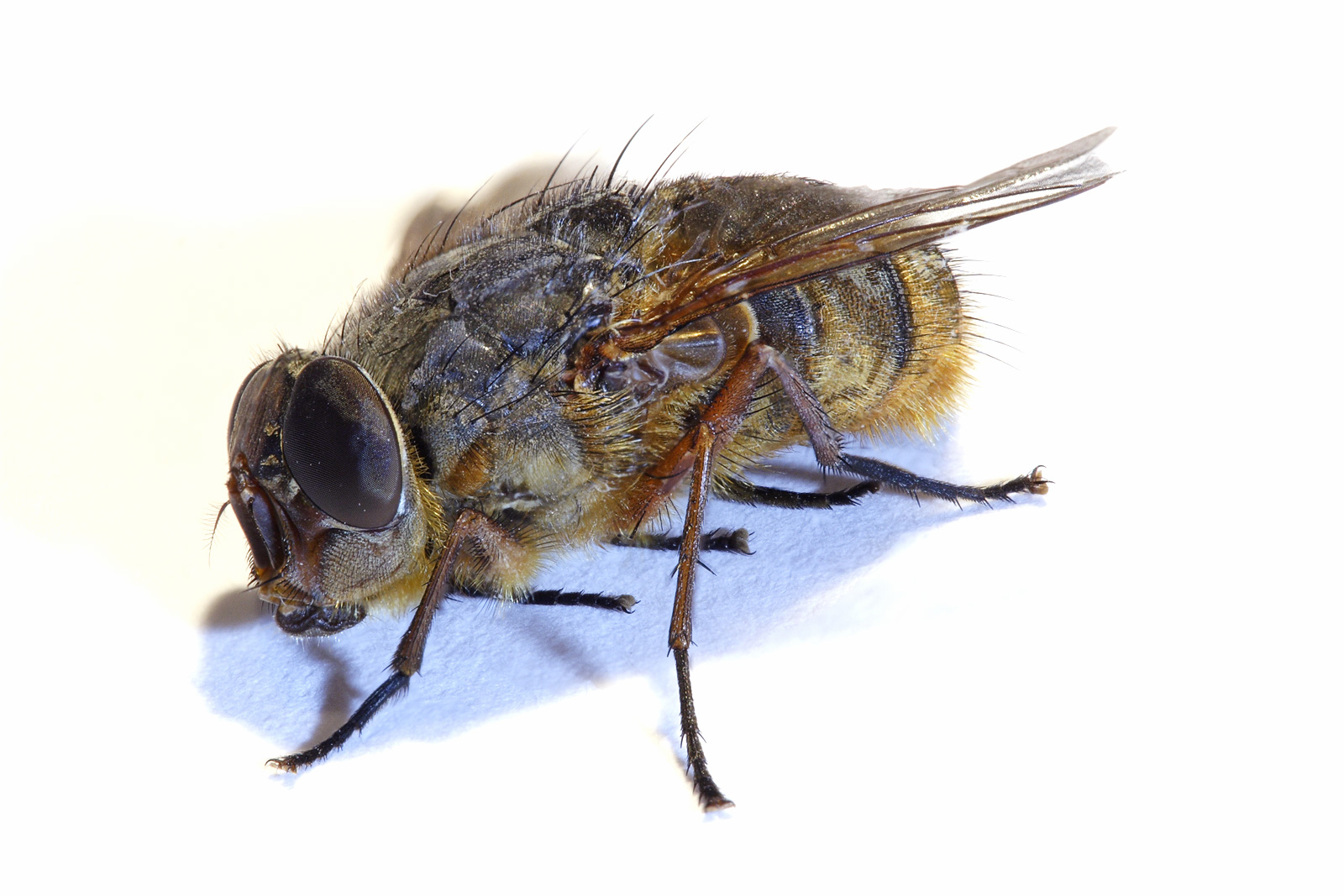

Scientific classification
- Kingdom: Animalia
- Phylum: Arthropoda
- Clade: Pancrustacea
- Class: Insecta
- Order: Diptera
- Family: Calliphoridae
- Genus: Calliphora
- Species: C. stygia

Binomial name
- Calliphora stygia (Fabricius, 1781)

= Calliphora stygia =

Species of fly

Calliphora stygia, commonly known as the brown blowfly, or rango tumaro in Māori, is a species of blow-fly that is found in Australia and New Zealand. The brown blowfly has a grey thorax and yellow-brown abdomen.

This fly is typically one of the first and primary colonizers on corpses, and are considered to be necrophagous and parasitic. It is able to colonize a body within hours after death, when it is considered to be in the "fresh" stage of decomposition. Regardless of the environment a body is in, adult C. stygia will lay eggs in any, and all orifices such as, but not limited to eyes, nose, mouth, and wounds that occur before and after death. Colonies are formed from larval masses that congregate in the abdomen and chest cavity of a corpse. C. stygia, being native to Australia and New Zealand, co-exist with other necrophagous flies such as C. hilli, L. sericata, and C. vicine. C. stygia is part of a natural process of decomposition called succession: flies that tend to colonize after C. stygia, are C. rufifaccies and H. rostra.

== Description ==
Calliphora stygia has a brassy abdomen with a dense, tessellate golden dusting. The underside of the body and the femora and tibiae of the legs are yellow. Males are holoptic, meaning the eyes cover much of the head and almost meet dorsally, whereas females are dichoptic, meaning the eyes are separated from each other.

This species resembles C. albifrontalis, another Australian species of Calliphora, but that species occurs in Western Australia whereas C. stygia occurs in the east. Other differences are that the upper third of the fore femora is orange in C. stygia but darkened in C. albifrontalis, and the minimum frons width of males is less than the anterior ocellus width in C. stygia but greater than it in C. albifrontalis.

== Forensics ==
Due to being a prominent colonizer C. stygia has an important role in Australian forensics. When a body has been dead for more than 72 hours, long enough that temperature cannot give an accurate time of death, insects can be used instead. Larval secession can aid in determining the time of death through aging the insects that are removed from the body; however insect age can be altered by temperature, humidity, larval density in and on the corpse, and the location on the body after death. Also the presence of drugs can affect the succession rate and relative age on any insects feeding on the flesh of the corpse.

The study of drug effects on insects is known as entomotoxicology, and research in this field has been lacking, especially in terms of C. stygia. Some important findings have been made recently, one in particular is the effect of morphine on C. stygia development, or lack thereof. It is unclear as to why exactly C. stygia is not affected by the drug though it has been consumed by the body from which came from the fly's food source, when most other insects show severe impairments in larval development. What is known is the malpighian tubules of C. stygia are connected with reduced levels of morphine in the fly's systems. When morphine levels are high in the fly's food source there are more secretions from the larva.

Methamphetamine, on the other hand, does affect the C. stygia larval development. Larvae that had been raised on meth-infused meat developed faster and ended up larger in size, and weight. The increase in body size poses a problem for determining relative ages of larvae since most use body size as an indication of age. Time estimates can be up to 78 hours off. The other difficulty for establishing time of death is determining what species of insect is coming off a cadaver. Since methamphetamines are toxic to C. stygia most flies die in the pupal stage, it is difficult to make proper identifications.

== Life history ==
Calliphora stygia has three life stages; 3 larval instars, pupa, and adult. In the larval stage, it is very difficult to determine the species; most entomologists wait until the adult emerges to identify specimens.

Larvae feed on the soft tissues of a corpse or host that they were placed on by their parent. Due to their main source of food, C. stygia bioaccumulate toxins and heavy metals that may be present in the flesh. Insects can hold these toxins for months after the tissues disappear. These flies are also affected by weather conditions. The third instar is extremely tolerant to wet conditions, but perish at temperatures greater than 35 degree Celsius.

Pupation, on average, take around 32 hours, but can take up to 48. This state can last as long as 3 weeks in wet, dark, and highly oxygenated conditions. Dry conditions tend to increase mortality rates. Emergence typically happens at dawn when environmental conditions are more humid, and more favorable to young flies. C. stygia don't appear to have a seasonal dependence for emergence; however they do have light and temperature cues. These flies are capable of emerging in the absence of those cues, and this is thought to be done with circadian rhythms that are set during the last instar before pupation. C. stygia's circadian rhythm tends to be 23 hours on average.

Adults tend to produce equal proportions of male and female offspring, and are capable of laying eggs all year round. Life spans of C. stygia adults range on average from 15–91 days depending on the temperature in their early adult life, as well as their levels the fat concentration received from their diets. Low temperatures and low fat diets appear to prolong their adult life span. As they age they decrease their caloric intake. Female flies on high fat diets lived longer than males on the same food, and the reverse happened with low fat diets. Diet does not appear to affect C. stygia egg production, though warmer temperature will delay egg laying.

Calliphora stygia are capable of detecting the odors that occur immediately after death. Their chemosensory sensilla, which have their olfactory neurons are primarily located at the tips of their antennae, as well as on their maxillary palps, aid in their hunt for food sources. They have three part to their antennal receptors: odorant receptors, gustatory receptors, and ionotropic receptors. There does not appear to be any difference in the olfactory capabilities of C. stygia between sexes, but it is believed the male and females flies perceive scents differently, especially pheromones. This area needs more insight from future research.

== Genetics ==
The DNA and RNA sequences for olfaction receptors in C. stygia are more similar to those found in the Lepidopteran order than other Dipterans.

Calliphora stygia is believed to have recently speciated less than one million years ago, making it a relatively new species. The COI and the COII genes, which have been used to determine dipteran relatedness, are so similar that it is difficult to distinguish C. stygia from C. albifrontalis; C. stygia sister species.

== Effects ==
Calliphora stygia affects living animals, particularly in New Zealand agriculture. The fly can cause the flystrike disease in sheep when the maggots it lays burrow into the sheep's skin. This form of parasitism is better known as myiasis. These flystrike infections can cause 2% herd loss per year. Many have tried to control the fly numbers by establishing traps, but they seem to have little effect on C. stygia flies.

One animal that does affect C. stygia flies is a tree frog, Litoria caerulea. This frog secretes a toxic substance that alters C. stygia behavior, either making then spastic or non-motile. Upon picking up the secretion the fly will increase grooming, which may lead to ingestion, the motor, sensory, and respiratory functions may be impaired. Long exposures or ingestion of these toxins will be fatal to a fly, and prevent the frog from being a host.

Other studies have been and are being done to reduce the effect C. stygia has on agriculture and how these primary colonizers can better aid in forensic investigations.

C. stygia adapts well to cold conditions and in winter can be found in Australia as far south as southern Victoria. During spring their maggots develop from carcasses, but over summer their numbers drop as temperatures rise and other species such as C. albifrontalis dominate.
