= Dimethyl trisulfide =

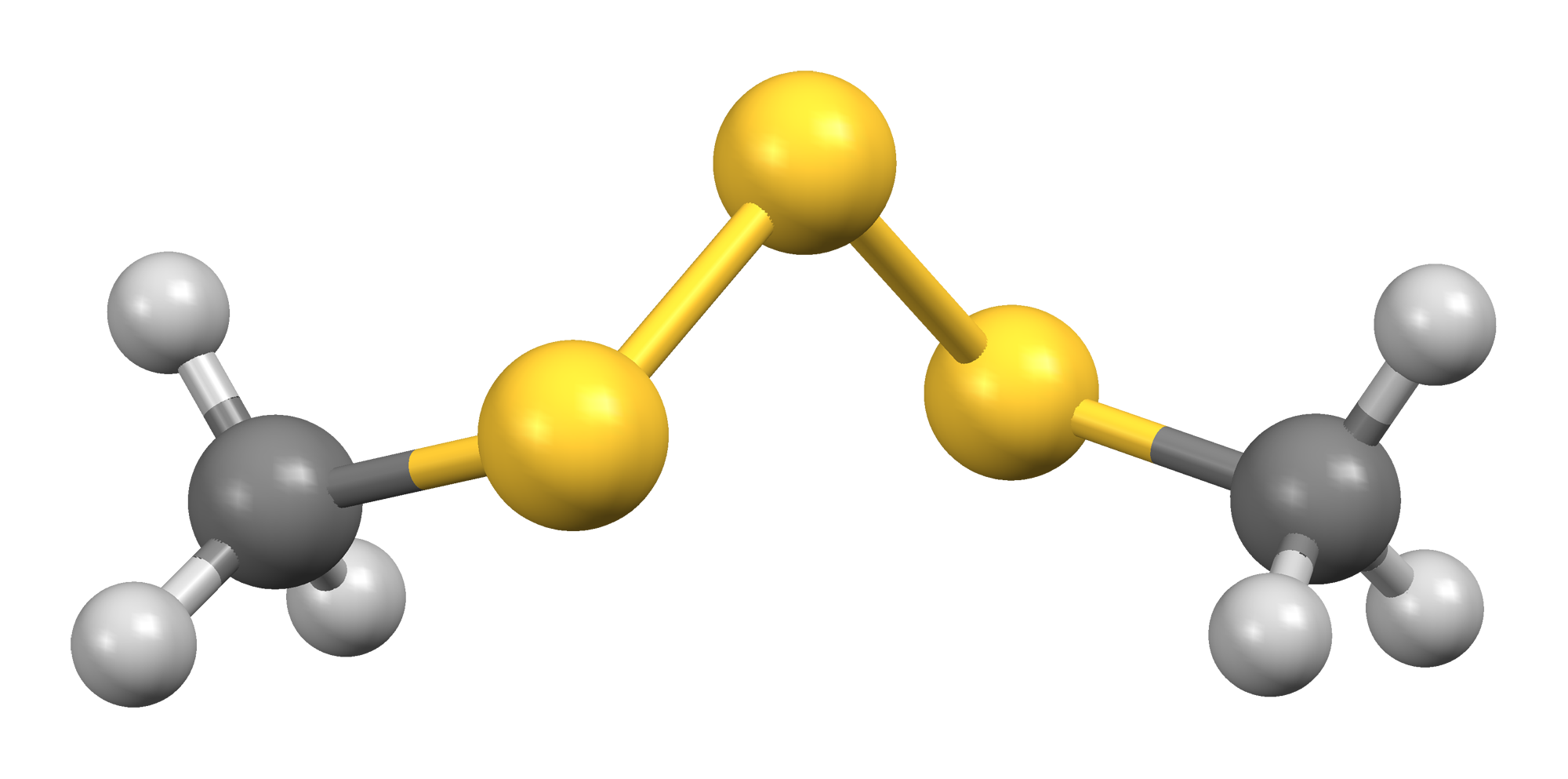

Names
- Preferred IUPAC name Dimethyltrisulfane
- Other names 2,3,4-trithiapentane

Identifiers
| CAS Number | 3658-80-8 |
| 3D model (JSmol) | Interactive image |
| ChEBI | CHEBI:4614 |
| ChemSpider | 18219 |
| ECHA InfoCard | 100.020.828 |
| EC Number | 222-910-9 |
| KEGG | C08372 |
| PubChem CID | 19310 |
| UNII | 3E691T3NL1 |
| CompTox Dashboard (EPA) | DTXSID9063118 |
- InChI: InChI=1S/C2H6S3/c1-3-5-4-2/h1-2H3 Key: YWHLKYXPLRWGSE-UHFFFAOYSA-N; InChI=1/C2H6S3/c1-3-5-4-2/h1-2H3 Key: YWHLKYXPLRWGSE-UHFFFAOYAF
- SMILES: S(SSC)C

Properties
| Chemical formula | C_{2}H_{6}S_{3} |
| Molar mass | 126.26 g/mol |
| Appearance | Pale yellow liquid |
| Odor | Foul, powerful |
| Density | 1.1978 g/cm^{3} |
| Melting point | −68.05 °C (−90.49 °F; 205.10 K) |
| Boiling point | 170 °C (338 °F; 443 K) (65–68 °C @ 25 Torr) |

Hazards
- GHS labelling
| Pictograms | (GHS02: Flammable) (GHS07: Exclamation mark) |
| Signal word | Warning |
| Hazard statements | H226, H302, H315, H319, H335 |
| Precautionary statements | P210, P233, P240, P241, P242, P243, P261, P264, P264+P265, P270, P271, P280, P301+P317, P302+P352, P303+P361+P353, P304+P340, P305+P351+P338, P319, P321, P330, P332+P317, P337+P317, P362+P364, P370+P378, P403+P233, P403+P235, P405, P501 |
| Flash point | 56 °C |
- Except where otherwise noted, data are given for materials in their standard state (at 25 °C [77 °F], 100 kPa). verify (what is ?) Infobox references

Dimethyl trisulfide (DMTS) is an organic chemical compound and the simplest organic trisulfide, with the chemical formula CH_{3}SSSCH_{3}. It is a flammable liquid with a foul odor, which is detectable at levels as low as 1 part per trillion.

== Occurrence ==
Dimethyl trisulfide has been found in volatiles emitted from cooked onion, leek and other Allium species, from broccoli and cabbage, as well as from Limburger cheese, and is involved in the unpalatable aroma of aged beer and stale Japanese sake. It is a product of bacterial decomposition, including the early stages of human decomposition, and is a major attractant for blowflies looking for hosts. Dimethyl trisulfide along with dimethyl sulfide and dimethyl disulfide have been confirmed as volatile compounds given off by the fly-attracting plant known as dead-horse arum (Helicodiceros muscivorus). These flies are attracted to the odor of fetid meat and help pollinate this plant. DMTS contributes to the foul odor given off by the fungus Phallus impudicus, also known as the common stinkhorn. DMTS causes the characteristic malodorous smell of a fungating lesion, e.g., from cancer wounds, and contributes to the odor of human feces.

DMTS can be synthesized by the reaction of methanethiol with hydrogen sulfide (in the presence of copper (II)) and with sulfur dichloride, among other methods:

2 CH_{3}SH + SCl_{2} → CH_{3}SSSCH_{3} + 2 HCl

== Chemical reactions ==
On heating at 80 °C, DMTS slowly decomposes to a mixture of dimethyl di-, tri-, and tetrasulfides. The reactivity of DMTS is related to its weak sulfur-sulfur bond (ca. 45 kcal/mol). Dimethyl tetrasulfide, which is thermally more reactive than dimethyl trisulfide, has a still weaker (central) sulfur-sulfur bond (ca. 36 kcal/mol). Oxidation of DMTS by meta-chloroperoxybenzoic acid (mCPBA) gives the corresponding S-monoxide, CH_{3}S(O)SSCH_{3}.

== Uses ==
Trap baits containing dimethyl trisulfide have been used to capture Calliphora loewi and other blowflies. Dimethyl trisulfide has been found to be an effective cyanide antidote in a rodent model for cyanide poisoning both against subcutaneous potassium cyanide and inhaled hydrogen cyanide, converting cyanide to much less toxic thiocyanate. It is suggested that dimethyl trisulfide can be used in a mass casualty cyanide exposure setting. In conjunction with these studies, the LD_{50} of dimethyl trisulfide in CD-1 mice was found to be 598.5 mg/kg, which may be compared to the LD_{50} of potassium cyanide of 8.0 mg/kg.
