= Cyanus =

Scientific classification
- Domain: Eukaryota
- Kingdom: Animalia
- Phylum: Arthropoda
- Class: Insecta
- Order: Diptera
- Family: Calliphoridae
- Subfamily: Calliphorinae
- Tribe: Calliphorini
- Genus: Cyanus; Hall, 1948

Type species
- Cynomyia elongatus (Hough, 1898)

Genus of flies

The plant genus Cyanus is nowadays included in Centaurea.

Cyanus is a genus of flies in the family Calliphoridae.

== Species ==
- C. elongatus (Hough, 1898)
