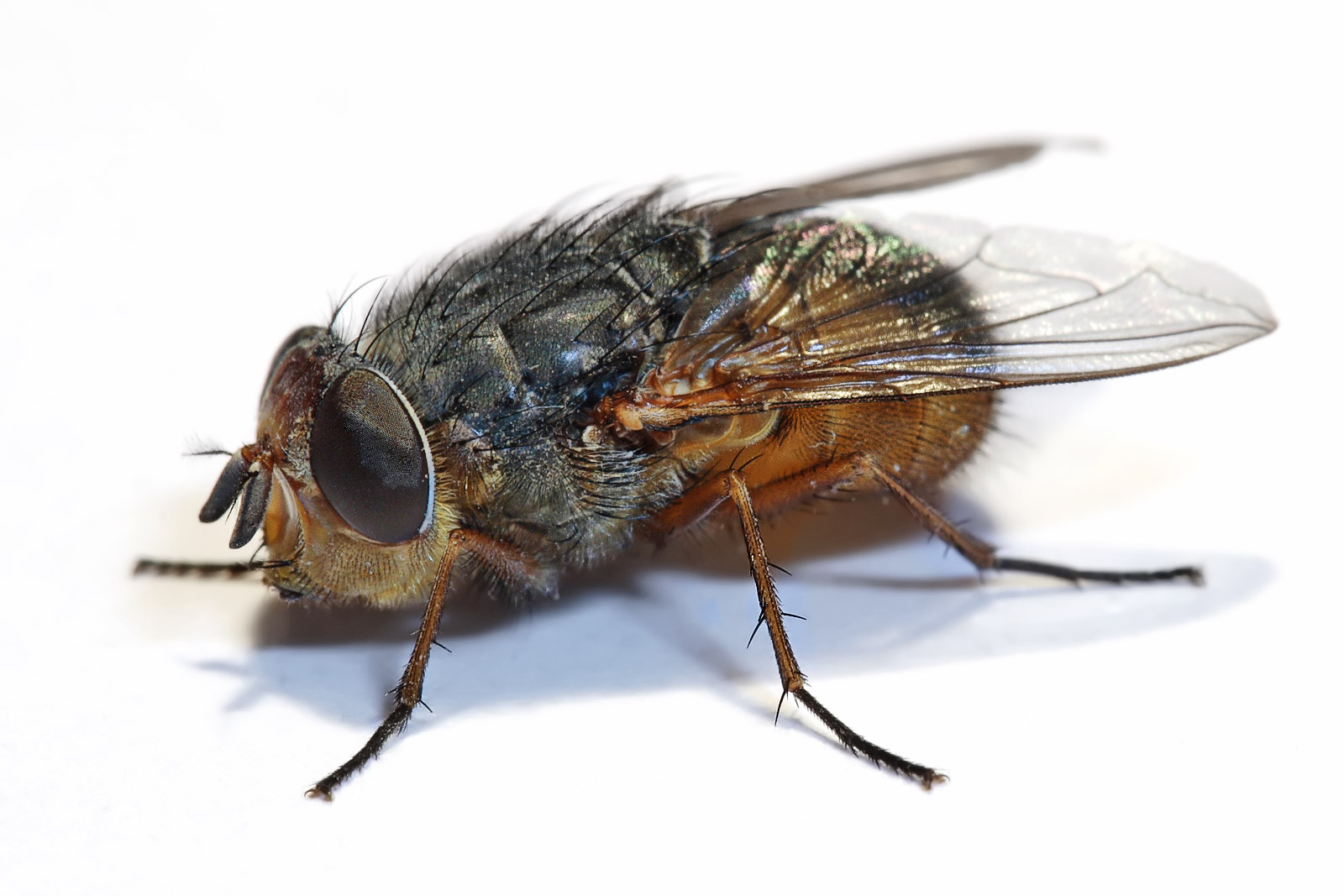
- Female

Scientific classification
- Kingdom: Animalia
- Phylum: Arthropoda
- Clade: Pancrustacea
- Class: Insecta
- Order: Diptera
- Family: Calliphoridae
- Genus: Calliphora
- Species: C. augur

Binomial name
- Calliphora augur (Fabricius, 1775)

= Calliphora augur =

Species of fly

Calliphora augur, known as the lesser brown blowfly or bluebodied blowfly, is a species of blow-fly that is native to Australia. It is similar to the eastern goldenhaired blowfly (common brown blowfly) but slightly smaller, and its abdomen has a central dark blue patch.

It is a common visitor to houses and is also noted as a perpetrator of flystrike on sheep. It lays living maggots (Viviparous), unlike most blow-fly species which lay eggs.

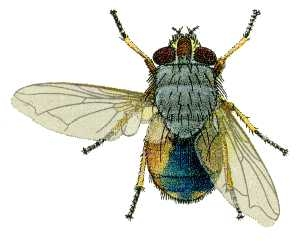
Illustrative view from above showing the blue patch on the abdomen
