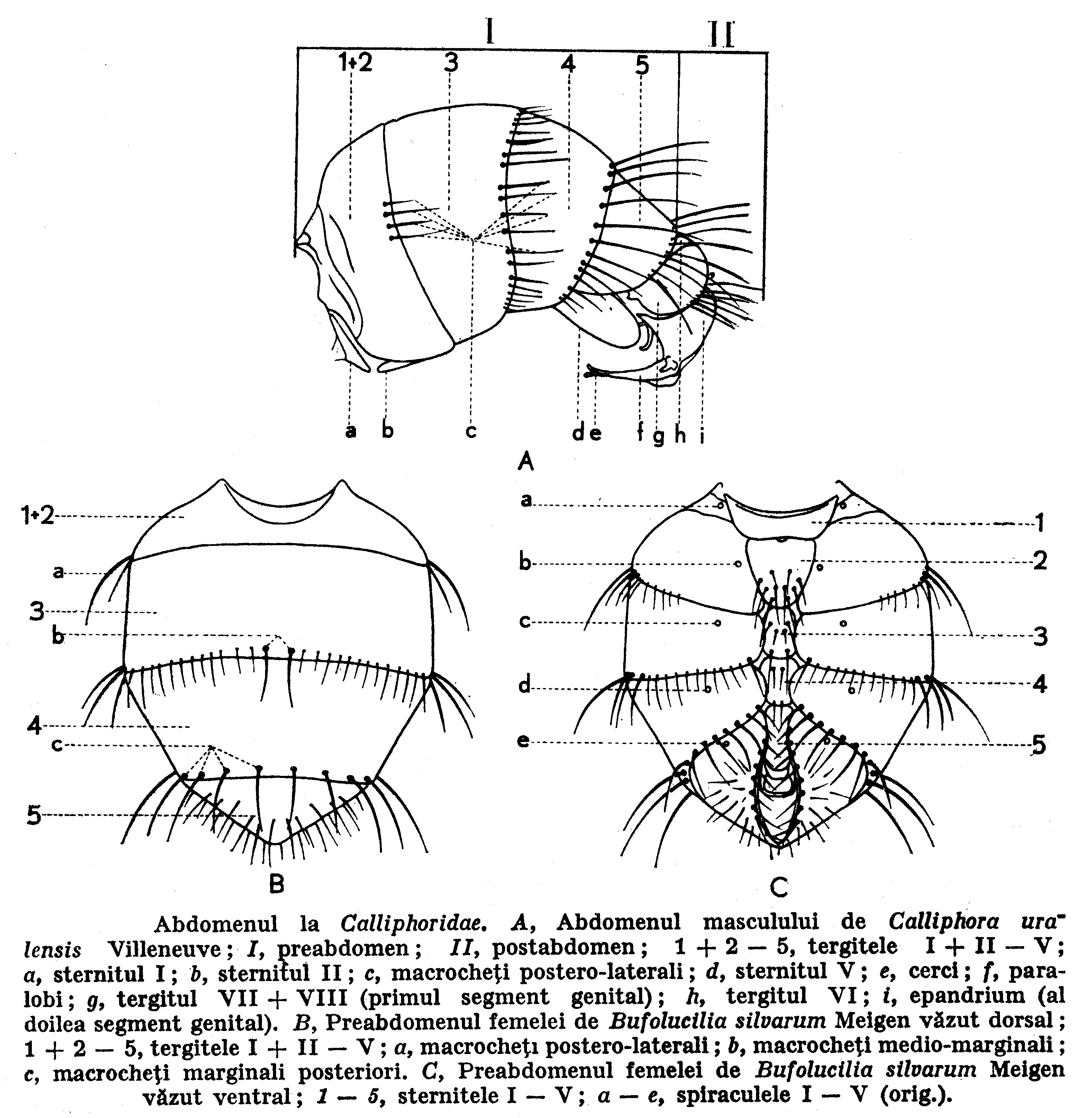
- Body of Calliphora written in Romanian.

Scientific classification
- Kingdom: Animalia
- Phylum: Arthropoda
- Clade: Pancrustacea
- Class: Insecta
- Order: Diptera
- Family: Calliphoridae
- Genus: Calliphora
- Species: C. uralensis

Binomial name
- Calliphora uralensis Villeneuve, 1922

Synonyms
- Calliphora pseudoerythrocephala Kramer, 1928; Calliphora turanica Rohdendorf, 1926

= Calliphora uralensis =

Species of fly

Calliphora uralensis is a species of fly from genus Calliphora, family Calliphoridae, described by Villeneuve in 1922. According to the Catalogue of Life, Calliphora uralensis does not have known subspecies.
