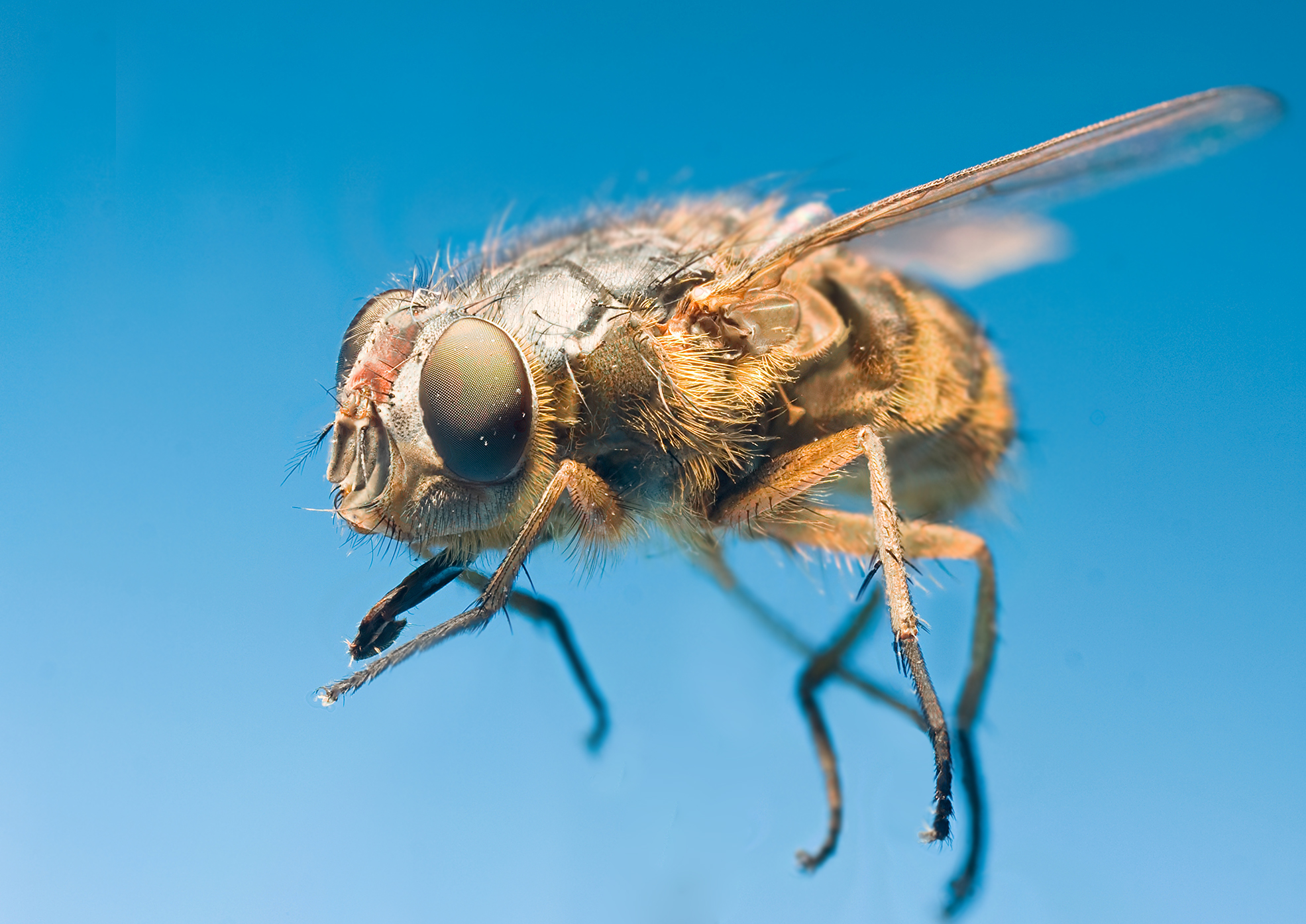

Scientific classification
- Kingdom: Animalia
- Phylum: Arthropoda
- Class: Insecta
- Order: Diptera
- Family: Calliphoridae
- Genus: Calliphora
- Species: C. hilli

Binomial name
- Calliphora hilli Patton, 1925

Subspecies
- C. hilli fallax Hardy, 1930; C. hilli milleri Hardy, 1937

Synonyms
- C. fallax Hardy, 1930; C. kermadecensis Kurahashi, 1971; C. milleri Hardy, 1937; C. tahitiensis Kurahashi, 1971

= Calliphora hilli =

Species of fly

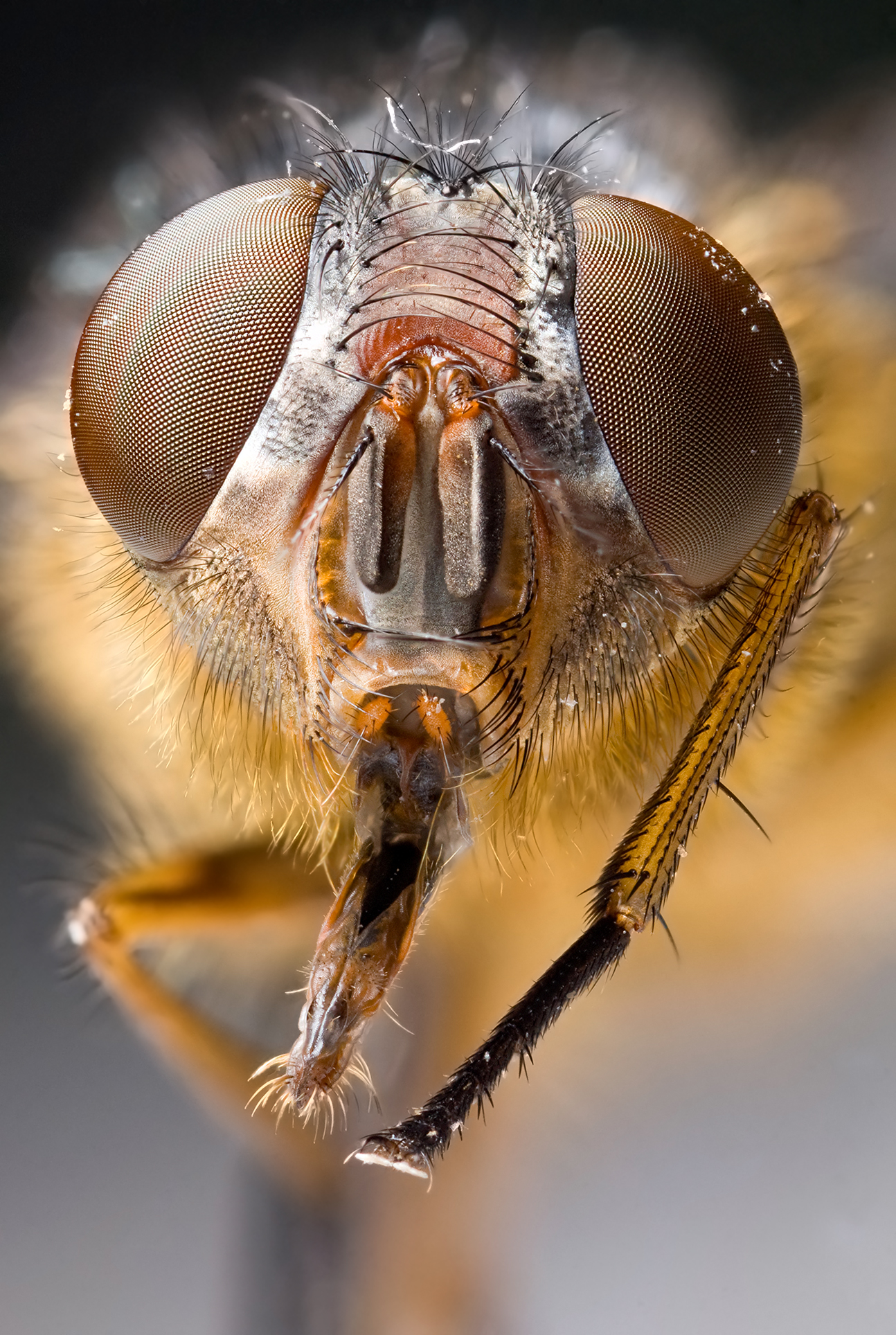
Portrait of Calliphora hilli

Calliphora hilli is a blow fly species in the genus Calliphora.
