= Calliphora coloradensis =

Scientific classification
- Domain: Eukaryota
- Kingdom: Animalia
- Phylum: Arthropoda
- Class: Insecta
- Order: Diptera
- Family: Calliphoridae
- Genus: Calliphora
- Species: C. coloradensis

Binomial name
- Calliphora coloradensis Hough, 1899

Species of fly

Calliphora coloradensis is a species of blow fly in the family Calliphoridae.
