= Dimethyl disulfide =

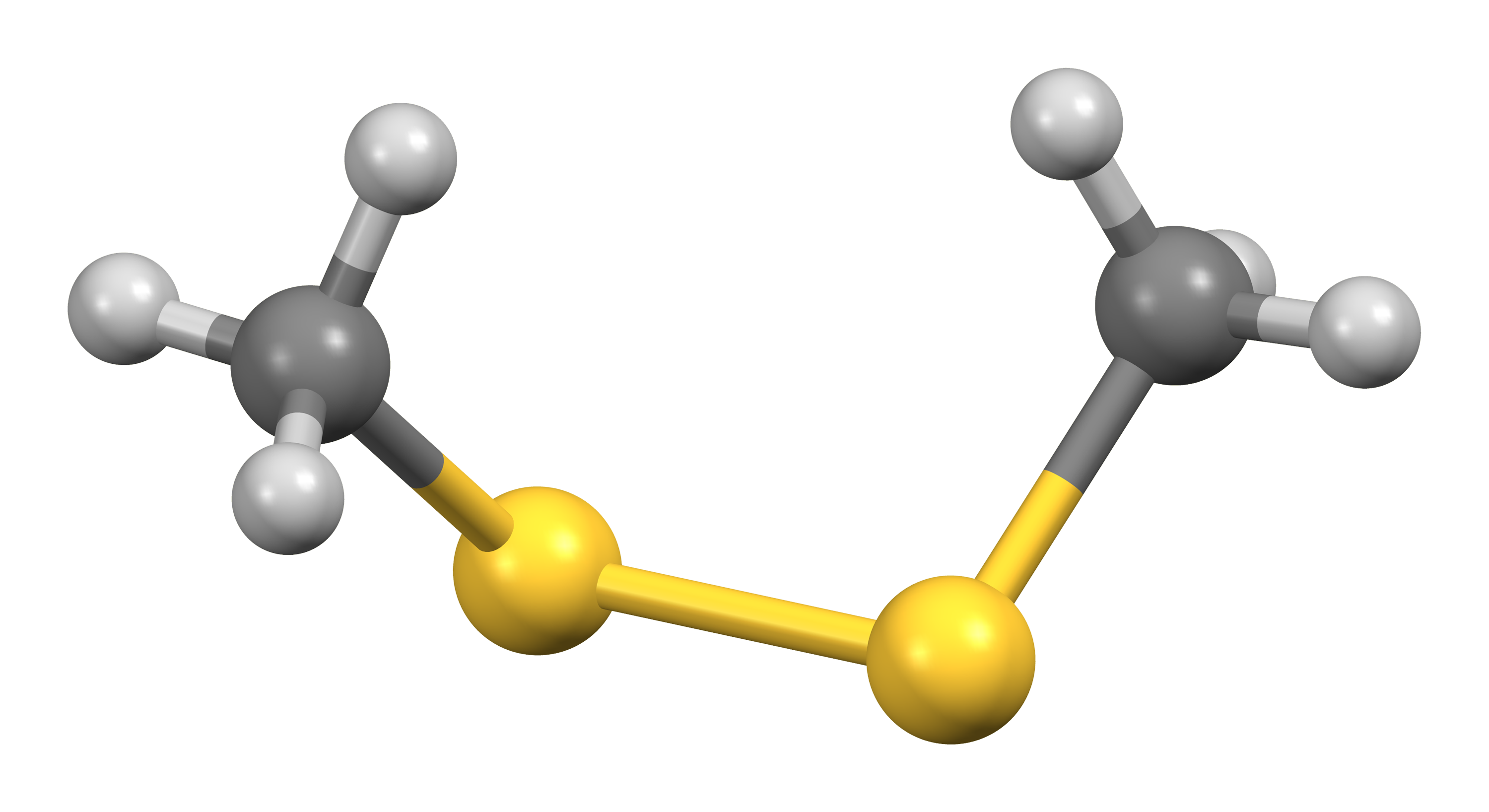

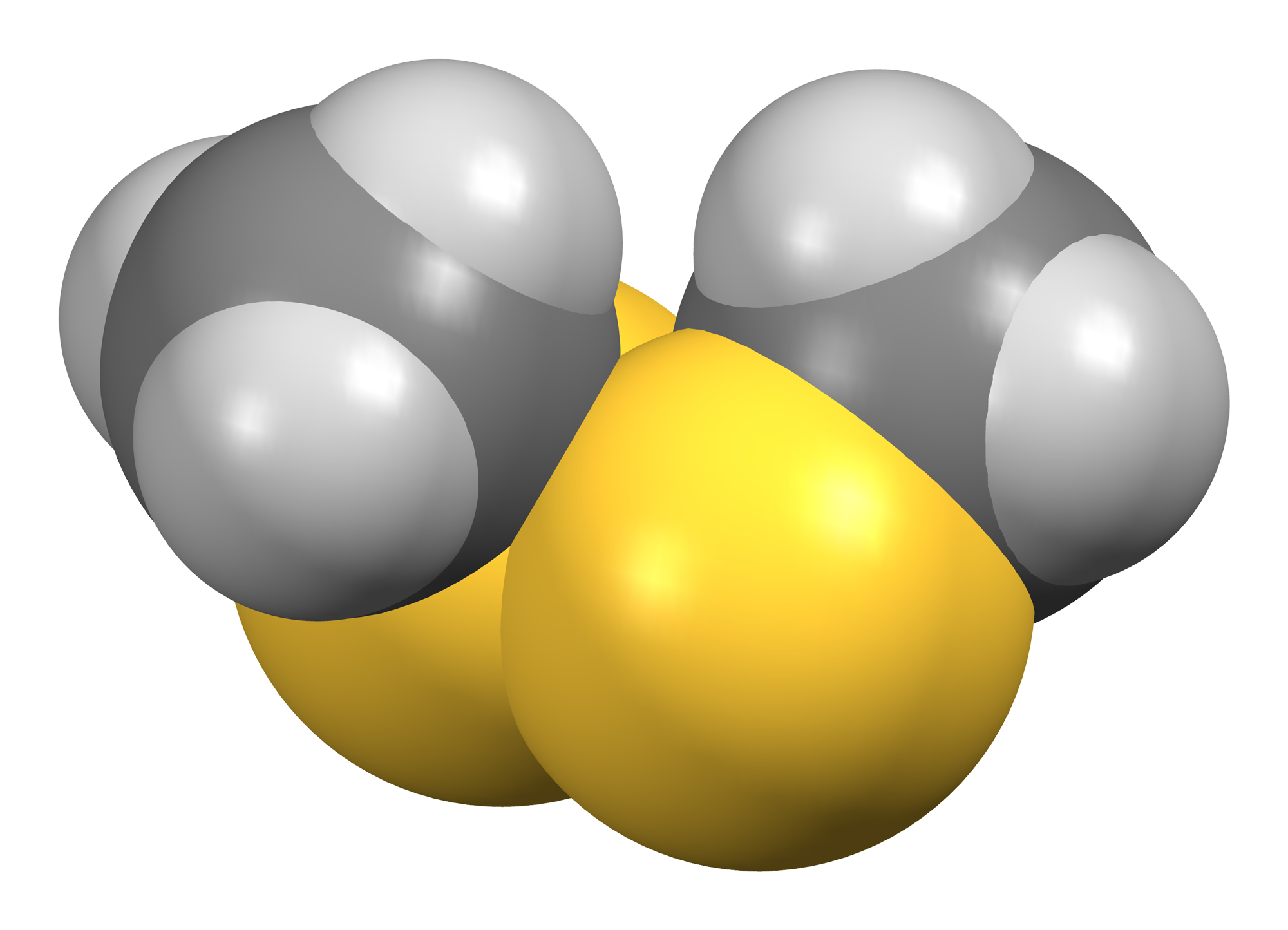

Names
- Preferred IUPAC name (Methyldisulfanyl)methane
- Other names Dimethyl disulfide Methyl disulfide Methyldisulfide; Dimethyldisulfide; Methyldithiomethane; 2,3-Dithiabutane

Identifiers
CAS Number	624-92-0
3D model (JSmol)	Interactive image
Abbreviations	DMDS (MeS)_{2}
ChEBI	CHEBI:4608
ChemSpider	11731
ECHA InfoCard	100.009.883
PubChem CID	12232
UNII	3P8D642K5E
CompTox Dashboard (EPA)	DTXSID4025117
- InChI: InChI=1S/C2H6S2/c1-3-4-2/h1-2H3 Key: WQOXQRCZOLPYPM-UHFFFAOYSA-N; InChI=1S/C2H6S2/c1-3-4-2/h1-2H3
- SMILES: S(SC)C

Properties
Chemical formula	CH_{3}SSCH_{3}
Molar mass	94.19 g·mol^{−1}
Appearance	Colorless liquid
Density	1.06 g/cm^{3}
Melting point	−85 °C (−121 °F; 188 K)
Boiling point	110 °C (230 °F; 383 K)
Solubility in water	2.5 g/L (20 °C)
Vapor pressure	3.8 kPa (at 25 °C) Arkema data sheet

Hazards
Flash point	15 °C (59 °F; 288 K)
Autoignition temperature	370 °C (698 °F; 643 K)
- Lethal dose or concentration (LD, LC)
LD_{50} (median dose)	190 mg/kg (oral, rat)
- Except where otherwise noted, data are given for materials in their standard state (at 25 °C [77 °F], 100 kPa). verify (what is ?) Infobox references

Dimethyl disulfide (DMDS) is an organic chemical compound with the molecular formula CH_{3}SSCH_{3}. It is a flammable liquid with an unpleasant, garlic-like odor resembling that of "leaking gas". The compound is colorless, although impure samples often appear yellowish.

== Occurrence and synthesis ==
Dimethyl disulfide is widespread in nature. It is emitted by bacteria, fungi, plants, and animals. Along with dimethyl sulfide and dimethyl trisulfide, it has been confirmed as volatile compounds given off by the fly-attracting plant known as dead-horse arum (Helicodiceros muscivorus). These flies are attracted to the odor resembling that of fetid meat, and thus help pollinate this plant. The James Webb Space Telescope has possibly detected evidence of DMDS in the atmosphere of the exoplanet K2-18b.

DMDS can be produced by the oxidation of methanethiol, e.g. with iodine:

2 CH_{3}SH + I_{2} → CH_{3}SSCH_{3} + 2 HI

== Chemical reactions ==
Important reactions include chlorination giving methanesulfenyl chloride (CH_{3}SCl), methanesulfinyl chloride (CH_{3}S(O)Cl), and methanesulfonyl chloride (CH_{3}SO_{2}Cl) as well as oxidation with hydrogen peroxide or peracetic acid giving the thiosulfinate compound, methyl methanethiosulfinate (CH_{3}S(O)SCH_{3}).

== Uses ==
DMDS is used as a food additive in onion, garlic, cheese, meats, soups, savory flavors, and fruit flavors. Industrially, DMDS is used in oil refineries as a sulfiding agent. It is also an effective soil fumigant in agriculture, registered in many states in the U.S. as well as globally. In this capacity, It is an important alternative in replacing methyl bromide, which is being phased out. However, it is less effective than the former. This pesticide is marketed as "Paladin" by Arkema.

=== Industrial use ===
DMDS is used to prepare catalysts for hydrodesulfurization, because of its high sulfur content and low decomposition temperature. Refineries use it instead of other sulfur spiking agents for catalyst sulfiding because it has more sulfur per pound than dimethyl sulfide (DMS) or di-tert-butyl polysulfide (TBPS). Once injected to a hydrotreater or hydrocracker, it decomposes to form H_{2}S. The H_{2}S reacts with the metal oxides on the catalyst, converting them to the active metal sulfide form.

DMDS also works as an effective product for operators in the petrochemicals industry who must protect their steam-cracking coils against the formation of coke and carbon monoxide.

DMDS is utilized in the preparation of 4-(methylthio)phenol which is used in the production of various pesticides. DMDS and chlorine are reacted with borontrifluoride phenoxide to produce 4-(methylthio)phenol. Thiophene and DMDS are blended with combustible hydrocarbon fuel gas to impart a gassy odor to the fuel gas.
