= Spiracle (arthropods) =

Opening in the exoskeletons of some arthropods

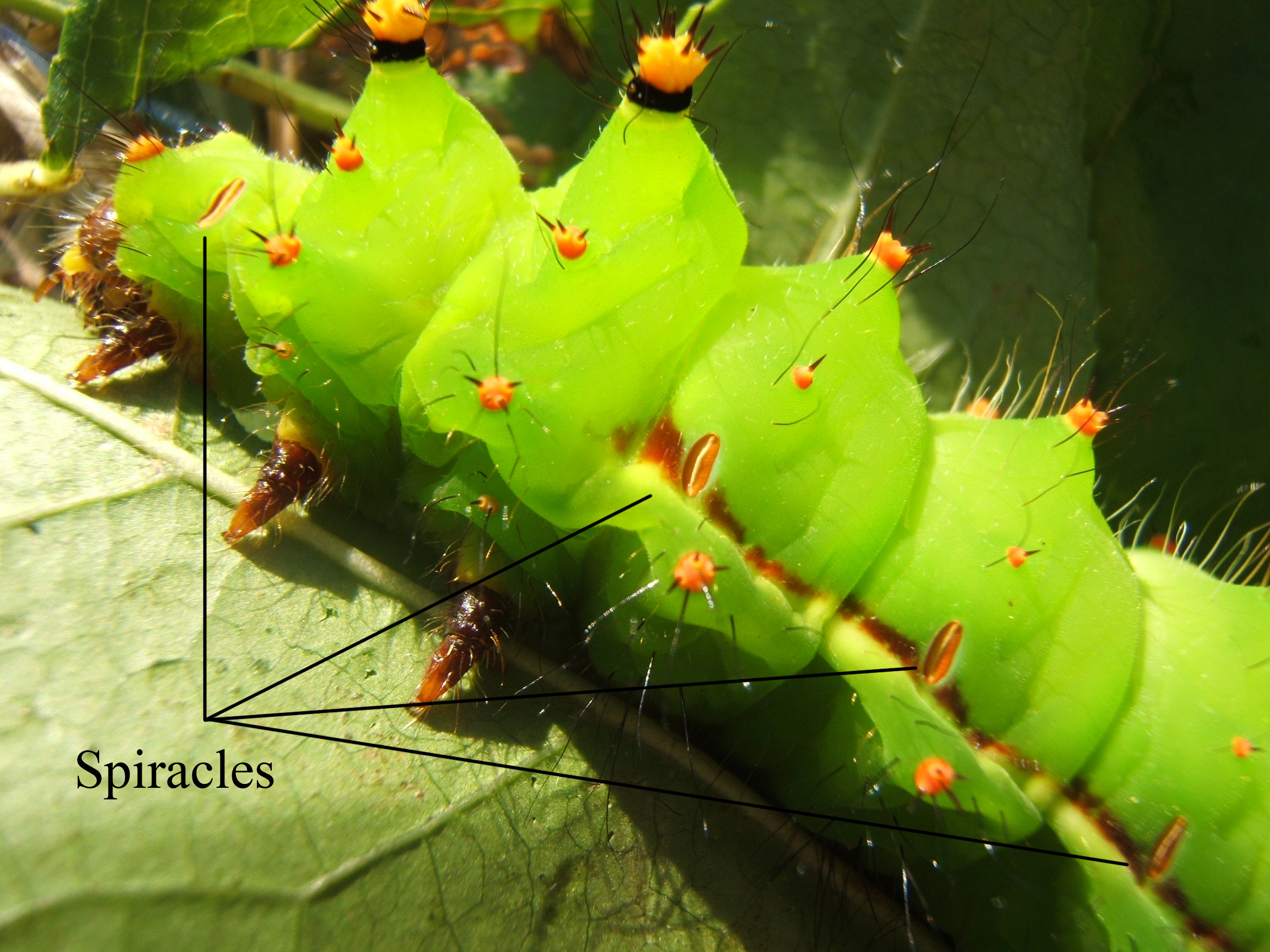
Indian moon moth (Actias selene) larva with some of the spiracles identified

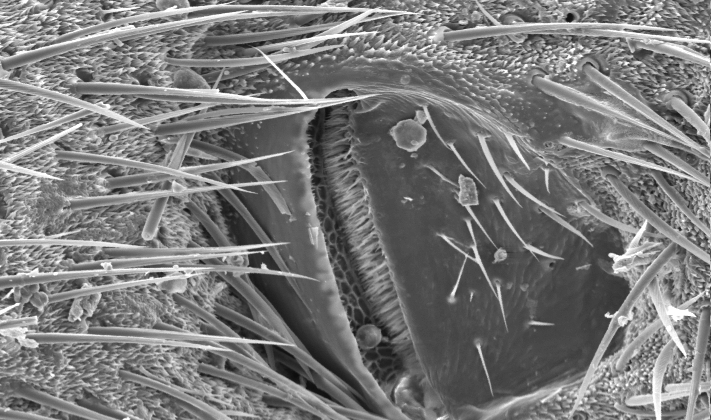
Scanning electron micrograph of a cricket spiracle valve

A spiracle or stigma is the opening in the exoskeletons of insects, myriapods, velvet worms and many arachnids to allow air to enter the trachea. Insect respiratory system differs from vertebrates'. The circulatory system plays a relatively minor role in circulating oxygen and removing carbon dioxide; instead, trachea and air sacs in the insect body allow direct gas exchange, and these tracheal tubes eventually connect to the external environment via spiracles.

In most species, the spiracles are controlled by motor neurons in the central nervous system. It can be opened and closed in an efficient manner to admit air while minimizing associated physiological costs, such as water loss during respiration. Many sensory stimuli can affect the control of spiracles in insects, e.g. chemosensory (carbon dioxide, oxygen, etc.) or mechanosensory (sound, touch, etc.). It has been shown that during metabolically intensive behaviors, such as flight, insects can dynamically modulate the spiracle opening size just so to meet the metabolic demand of flight, while not losing too much water.

In various species, control of spiracle opening is done by a wide range of mechanisms, such as elastic closure, and closer muscles surrounding the spiracle or kinking the tube. In some the muscle relaxes to open the spiracle, in others to close it. Several aquatic insects have similar or alternative closing methods to prevent water from entering the trachea. The timing and duration of spiracle closures can affect the respiratory rates of the organism. Spiracles may also be surrounded by hairs to minimize bulk air movement around the opening, and thus minimize water loss.

In larger insects, spiracle control is more complex and critical for managing gas exchange due to their higher metabolic demands. Larger insects, such as locusts and some beetles, exhibit active ventilation, where spiracle control works in concert with abdominal movements. These abdominal contractions force air in and out of the tracheal system, and the spiracles open and close in a synchronized manner to maximize oxygen intake and carbon dioxide expulsion. This active process allows these insects to regulate their internal environment more precisely, especially during periods of high activity, such as flight. Research has shown that neural circuits in the insect's central nervous system adjust the spiracle opening in response to carbon dioxide concentration, ensuring efficient gas exchange and preventing hypoxia or hypercapnia. Other body parts, such as the proboscis, might also extend or contract so as to ventilate the insect during various behaviors.

Most myriapods have paired lateral spiracles similar to those of insects. Scutigeromorph centipedes are an exception, having unpaired, non-closable spiracles at the posterior edges of tergites.

Velvet worms have tiny spiracles scattered over the surface of the body and linked to unbranched tracheae. There can be as many as 75 spiracles on a body segment. They are most abundant on the dorsal surface. They cannot be closed, which means velvet worms easily lose water and thus are restricted to living in humid habitats.

Although all insects have spiracles, only some arachnids have them. Some spiders such as orb weavers and wolf spiders have spiracles. Ancestrally, spiders have book lungs, not trachea. However, some spiders evolved a tracheal system independently of the tracheal system in insects, which includes independent evolution of the spiracles as well. These spiders retained their book lungs, however, so they have both. Harvestmen, camel spiders, ricinuleids, mites, and pseudoscorpions all breathe through a tracheal system and lack book lungs.

== Literature ==
- Chapman, R.F. (1998): The Insects, Cambridge University Press
