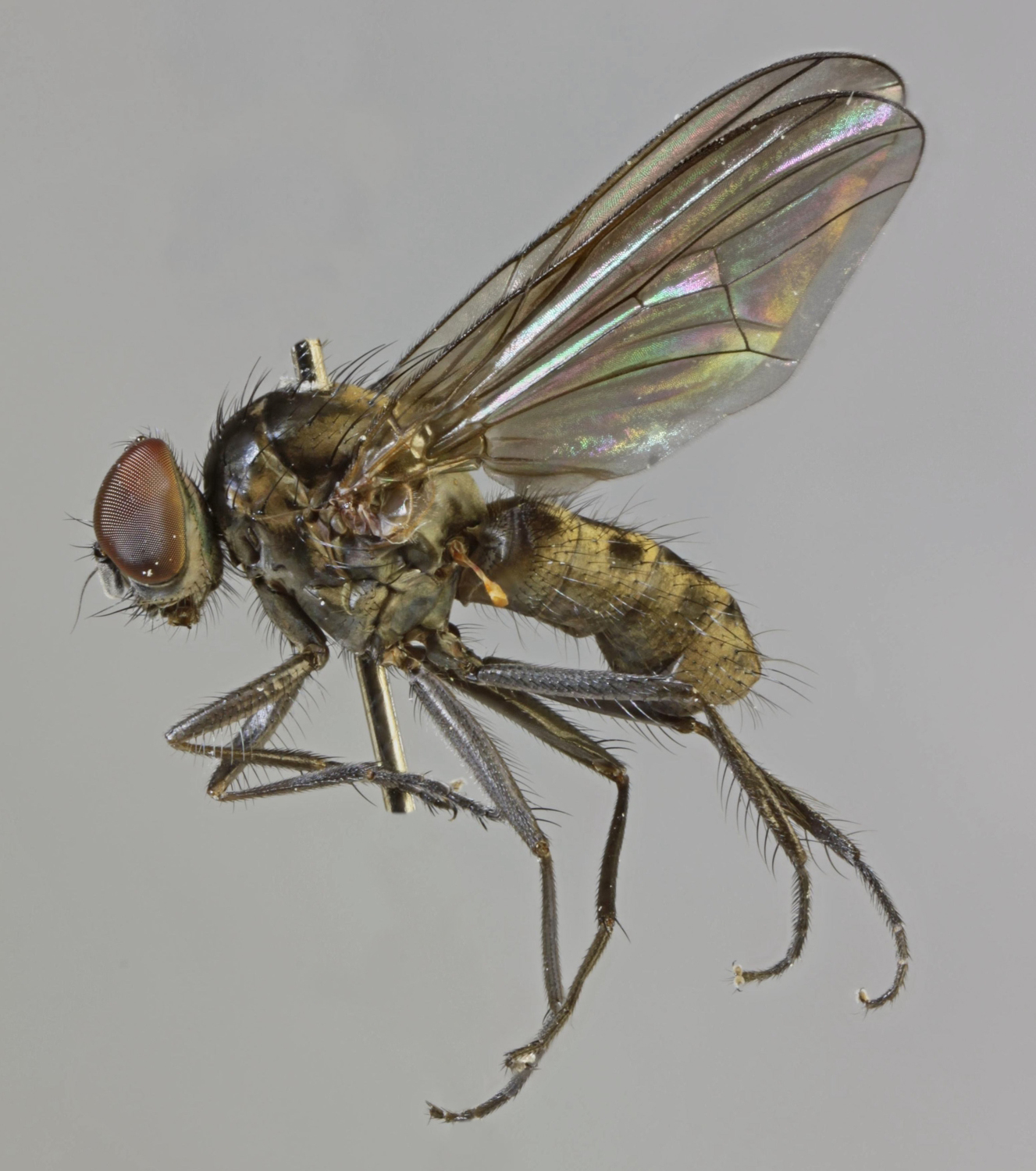
- Azelia nebulosa North Wales

Scientific classification
- Kingdom: Animalia
- Phylum: Arthropoda
- Class: Insecta
- Order: Diptera
- Family: Muscidae
- Subfamily: Azeliinae
- Tribe: Azeliini
- Genus: Azelia
- Species: A. nebulosa

Binomial name
- Azelia nebulosa (Robineau-Desvoidy, 1830)

Synonyms
- Musca ornate Harris, 1780; Azelia tibialis Robineau-Desvoidy, 1830; Atomogaster macquarti Stæger, 1843

= Azelia nebulosa =

Species of fly

Azelia nebulosa is a species of fly in the family Muscidae. It is found in the Palearctic.
