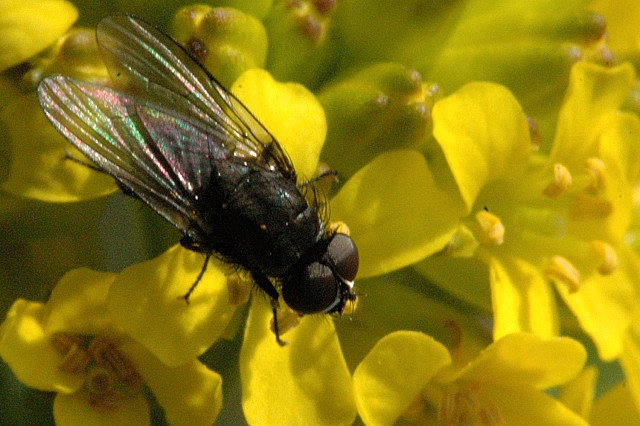

Scientific classification
- Kingdom: Animalia
- Phylum: Arthropoda
- Class: Insecta
- Order: Diptera
- Family: Muscidae
- Tribe: Azeliini
- Genus: Hydrotaea
- Species: H. ignava

Binomial name
- Hydrotaea ignava (Harris, 1780)

Synonyms
- Anthomyia leucostoma Wiedemann, 1817; Anthomyia opalia Walker, 1849; Musca ignava Harris, 1780

= Hydrotaea ignava =

Species of fly

Hydrotaea ignava is a species of house flies, etc. in the family Muscidae. It is found in Europe.
