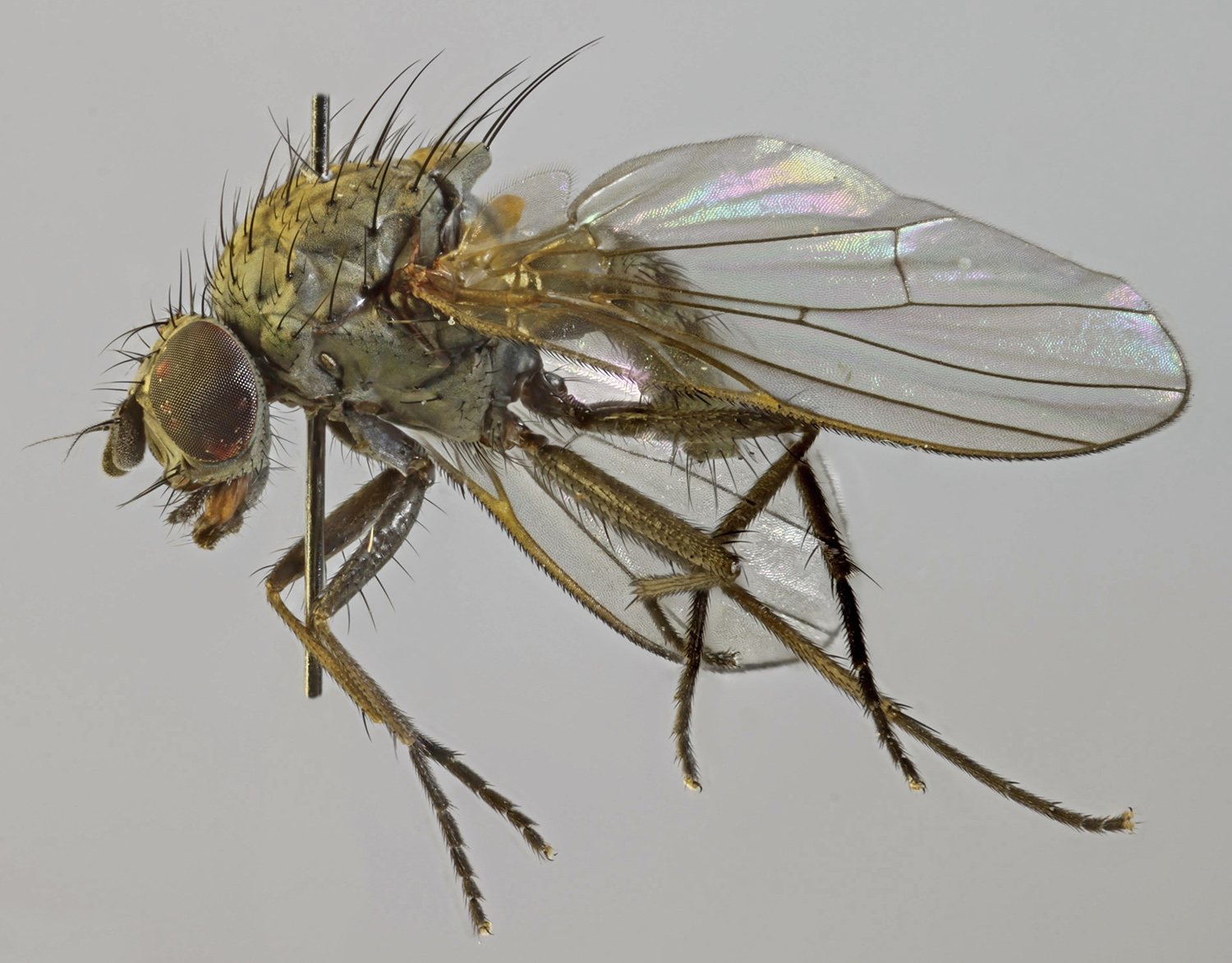
- Azelia cilipes North Wales

Scientific classification
- Kingdom: Animalia
- Phylum: Arthropoda
- Clade: Pancrustacea
- Class: Insecta
- Order: Diptera
- Family: Muscidae
- Subfamily: Azeliinae
- Tribe: Azeliini
- Genus: Azelia
- Species: A. cilipes

Binomial name
- Azelia cilipes (Haliday, 1838)

Synonyms
- Atomogaster duodecimpunctata Curtis, 1837; Anthomyia cilipes Haliday, 1838; Atomogaster tibialis Stæger, 1843; Aricia staegeri Zetterstedt, 1845; Trichopticus maculiventris Malloch, 1918; Azelia aequa Stein, 1920; Fannia pretiosina Curran, 1930

= Azelia cilipes =

Species of fly

Azelia cilipes is a species of fly in the family Muscidae. It is found in the Palearctic.
