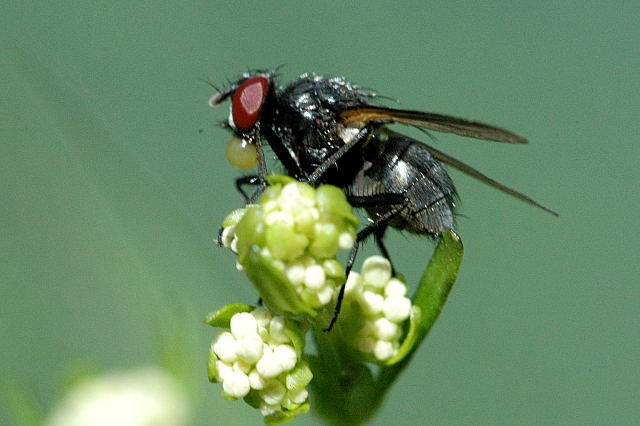
- Female Hydrotaea diabolus

Scientific classification
- Kingdom: Animalia
- Phylum: Arthropoda
- Class: Insecta
- Order: Diptera
- Family: Muscidae
- Subfamily: Azeliinae
- Tribe: Azeliini
- Genus: Hydrotaea; Robineau-Desvoidy, 1830

Type species
- Musca meteorica Linnaeus, 1758

Synonyms
- Ophyra Robineau-Desvoidy, 1830; Alloeonota Schnabl, 1911; Hydrotaeoides Skidmore, 1985

= Hydrotaea =

Genus of flies

Hydrotaea is a genus of insects in the housefly family, Muscidae. They occur in most regions of the world but are more populous in warmer climates. They are often found on feces in summer months, and are therefore generally found in close proximity to livestock. Among the 130 known species in this genus, one of the most commonly recognized is the dump fly.

Along with many other genera in the family, Hydrotaea is of forensic importance in both the economic and public health scene. Flies in general are considered by many authorities to be the most important insects involved in human and veterinary medicine. Certain Hydrotaea species have been proven to carry and transmit certain diseases to warm blooded animals, including humans. Researchers continue to monitor these vectors of disease as they have been connected with the spread of mastitis.

== Species ==
- H. acuta Stein, 1898
- H. aenescens (Wiedemann, 1830)
- H. albipuncta (Zetterstedt, 1845)
- H. anxia (Zetterstedt, 1838)
- H. armipes (Fallén, 1825)
- H. atrisquama Ringdahl, 1925
- H. australis Malloch, 1923
- H. basdeni Collin, 1939
- H. borussica Stein, 1899
- H. capensis (Wiedemann, 1818)
- H. chalcogaster (Wiedemann, 1824)
- H. cinerea Robineau-Desvoidy, 1830
- H. cristata Malloch, 1918
- H. cyrtoneurina (Zetterstedt, 1845)
- H. dentipes (Fabricius, 1805)
- H. depressa Huckett, 1954
- H. diabolus (Harris, 1780)
- H. floccosa Macquart, 1835
- H. glabricula (Fallén, 1825)
- H. hennigi Pont, 1986
- H. hirticeps (Fallén, 1824)
- H. hirtipes (Malloch, 1924)
- H. houghi Malloch, 1916
- H. ignava (Harris, 1780)
- H. irritans (Fallén, 1823)
- H. lasiophthalma Malloch, 1919
- H. lundbecki (Michelsen, 1978)
- H. meridionalis Porschinskiy, 1882
- H. meteorica (Linnaeus, 1758)
- H. militaris (Meigen, 1826)
- H. nidicola Malloch, 1925
- H. obscurifrons (Sabrosky, 1949)
- H. palaestrica (Meigen, 1826)
- H. pallicornis Pont, 1973
- H. pandellei Stein, 1899
- H. parva Meade, 1889
- H. pellucens Porchinskiy, 1879
- H. penicillata (Rondani, 1866)
- H. pilipes Stein, 1903
- H. pilitibia Stein, 1916
- H. ringdahli Stein, 1916
- H. rostrata Robineau-Desvoidy, 1830
- H. scambus (Zetterstedt, 1838)
- H. similis Meade, 1887
- H. spinifemorata Huckett, 1954
- H. spinigera Stein, 1910
- H. tersa (Wiedemann, 1830)
- H. tuberculata Rondani, 1866
- H. unispinosa Stein, 1898
- H. velutina Robineau-Desvoidy, 1830

== Description ==
Larvae of this genus are often dimorphic obligate carnivores. The second and third instars are predators, and the first is also carnivorous in some species. Some species have cannibalistic final instars. The smallest larvae are under 6 mm and the largest are up to 16 mm. The abdomen has ventral welts and large spiracles with sinuate slits.

Adults commonly feed on the blood of mammals. They are able to reopen wounds that are almost completely healed. Mouthpart morphology in the genus ranges from sponging mouthparts to mouths with rasping teeth. Many species have enlarged prestomal teeth. The metathoracic spiracle is covered in long, thick setae. The average male Hydrotaea is 6.5–8.5 mm and the average female is 5.75–7.5 mm. They are very light brown to bluish black with large, red eyes and plumose antennae.

== Habitat ==
Flies in this genus are found in the warmer parts of North and South America, Europe, Asia, and Australia. They are most commonly found in urban settings. They are attracted to fermentation and are often found in vegetation, feces, and decomposing carcasses, mainly those dead longer than ten days.

== Life cycle ==
The life cycle of Hydrotaea rostrata has been studied in the field of forensic entomology. Mature flies seek out decay, preferably in material that has been dead for an extended amount of time. Masses of maggots, which are often characteristic of other species of flies, are not typical of H. rostrata. The larvae of this species progress through three stages, or instars, which are then followed by the formation of a pupa. The adult fly emerges from the pupa. The developmental process from egg to adult takes between 518.4 and 1555.6 hours, according to one study in Australia. Development is more rapid in warmer temperatures of 19–30 °C (66–86 °F). In cooler temperatures of 12–18 °C (54–64 °F), development may take up to 64.5 days.

The larvae of another species, the black dump fly (H. aenescens), inhabit fecal material and consume other larvae, including those of Musca domestica, the housefly. The black dump fly is commercially available for use in housefly control. It is also useful in forensics, as it may inhabit corpses.

Some larvae are able to seek shelter underground in cold conditions.

== Associated pathogens ==
Research has incriminated Hydrotaea irritans as a vector of summer mastitis, a bovine infection that can be caused by multiple suspected bacteria. The research allowed flies inoculated with select bacteria from a sample representing summer mastitis to come in contact with the udders of cattle. The bacteria appeared in some of the cows and on the bodies of just over a third of the doctored flies. The evidence indicates that H. irritans transmits the bacterial species Staphylococcus aureus, Streptococcus dysgalactiae, Streptococcus uberis, Streptococcus agalactiae, Arcanobacterium pyogenes, Peptostreptococcus indolicus, and Fusobacterium necrophorum.

H. irritans attacks many other warm-blooded animals, including humans.

H. aenescens also carries bacteria, particularly Salmonella serovar Infantis.

== Forensic importance ==
Hydrotaea species have been helpful in forensic cases worldwide by indicating post-mortem interval (PMI). These flies typically inhabit a carcass 4 to 5 months after the start of decomposition. Their presence indicates that the corpse was not burned and that the earlier blow-fly phase has ended. Hydrotaea larvae may feed on each other and on other flies, such as blow-flies.

Hydrotaea can be used to identify drugs and to determining whether a body was relocated. Hydrotaea spinigera can make up 70% of the muscid fly population on a corpse in forested habitat. Hydrotaea rostrata may arrive at a decomposing body on the second day of decay, and may stay up to 34 days or until the body is skeletonized.
