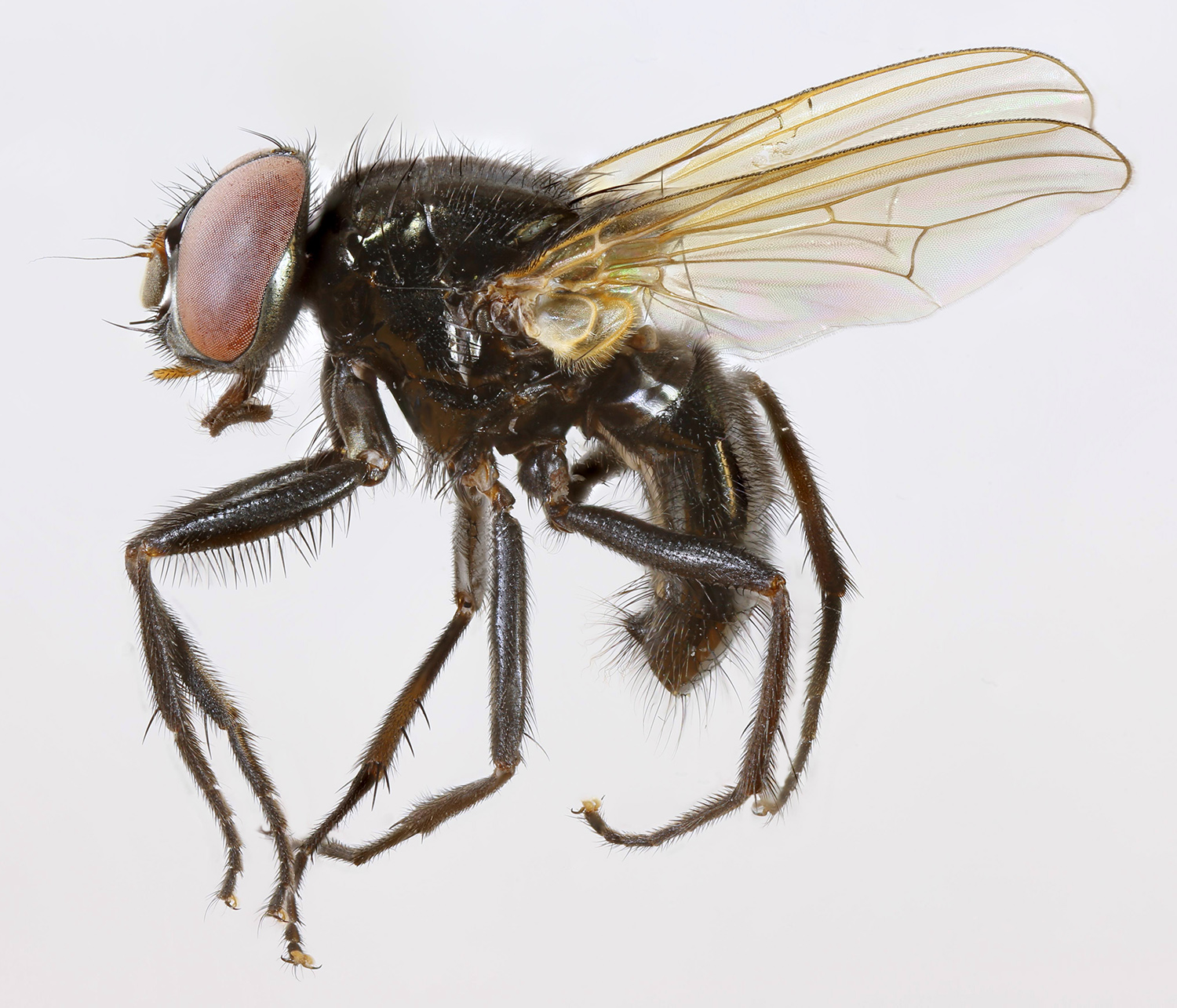
- H. aenescens from North Wales

Scientific classification
- Kingdom: Animalia
- Phylum: Arthropoda
- Class: Insecta
- Order: Diptera
- Family: Muscidae
- Tribe: Azeliini
- Genus: Hydrotaea
- Species: H. aenescens

Binomial name
- Hydrotaea aenescens (Wiedemann, 1830)

Synonyms
- Anthomyia aenescens Wiedemann, 1830; Ophyra aenescens

= Hydrotaea aenescens =

Species of fly

Hydrotaea aenescens, known generally as black dump fly, is a species in the family Muscidae. Other common names include the black garbage fly and dump fly. It is found in Europe. Larvae of this species are predators of Musca domestica. The adults are known vectors of human botfly eggs.
