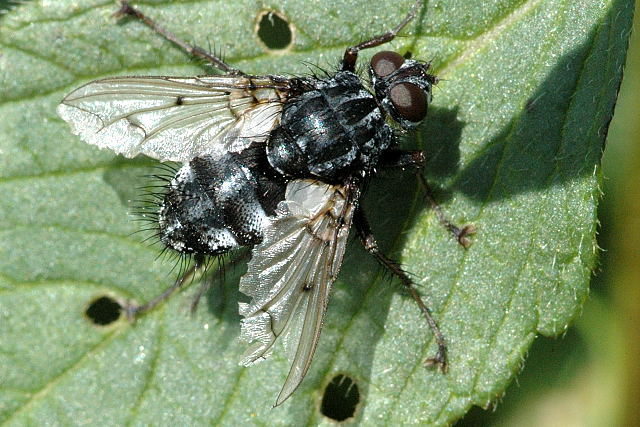
- Trixa conspersa

Scientific classification
- Kingdom: Animalia
- Phylum: Arthropoda
- Class: Insecta
- Order: Diptera
- Family: Tachinidae
- Subfamily: Dexiinae
- Tribe: Dexiini
- Genus: Trixa
- Species: T. conspersa

Binomial name
- Trixa conspersa (Harris, 1776)

Synonyms
- Amsteinia punctipennis Bremi, 1858; Crameria oestroidea Robineau-Desvoidy, 1830; Musca conspersus Harris, 1776; Trixa amsteinii Macquart, 1848; Trixa buchtamaensis Kolomiets, 1973; Trixa dorsalis Meigen, 1824; Trixa imhoffi Macquart, 1848; Trixa variegata Meigen, 1824

= Trixa conspersa =

Species of fly

Trixa conspersa is a species of fly in the family Tachinidae.

== Distribution ==
British Isles, Czech Republic, Estonia, Hungary, Poland, Romania, Slovakia, Ukraine, Finland, Norway, Sweden, Bulgaria, Croatia, Greece, Italy, Serbia, Austria, Belgium, France, Germany, Netherlands, Switzerland, Kazakhstan, Russia, Transcaucasia, China.
