= Muscina pascuorum =

Scientific classification
- Domain: Eukaryota
- Kingdom: Animalia
- Phylum: Arthropoda
- Class: Insecta
- Order: Diptera
- Family: Muscidae
- Tribe: Reinwardtiini
- Genus: Muscina
- Species: M. pascuorum

Binomial name
- Muscina pascuorum (Meigen, 1826)

Synonyms
- Musca pascuorum Meigen, 1826

Species of fly

Muscina pascuorum is a species of house flies, etc. in the family Muscidae. It is found in Europe.
