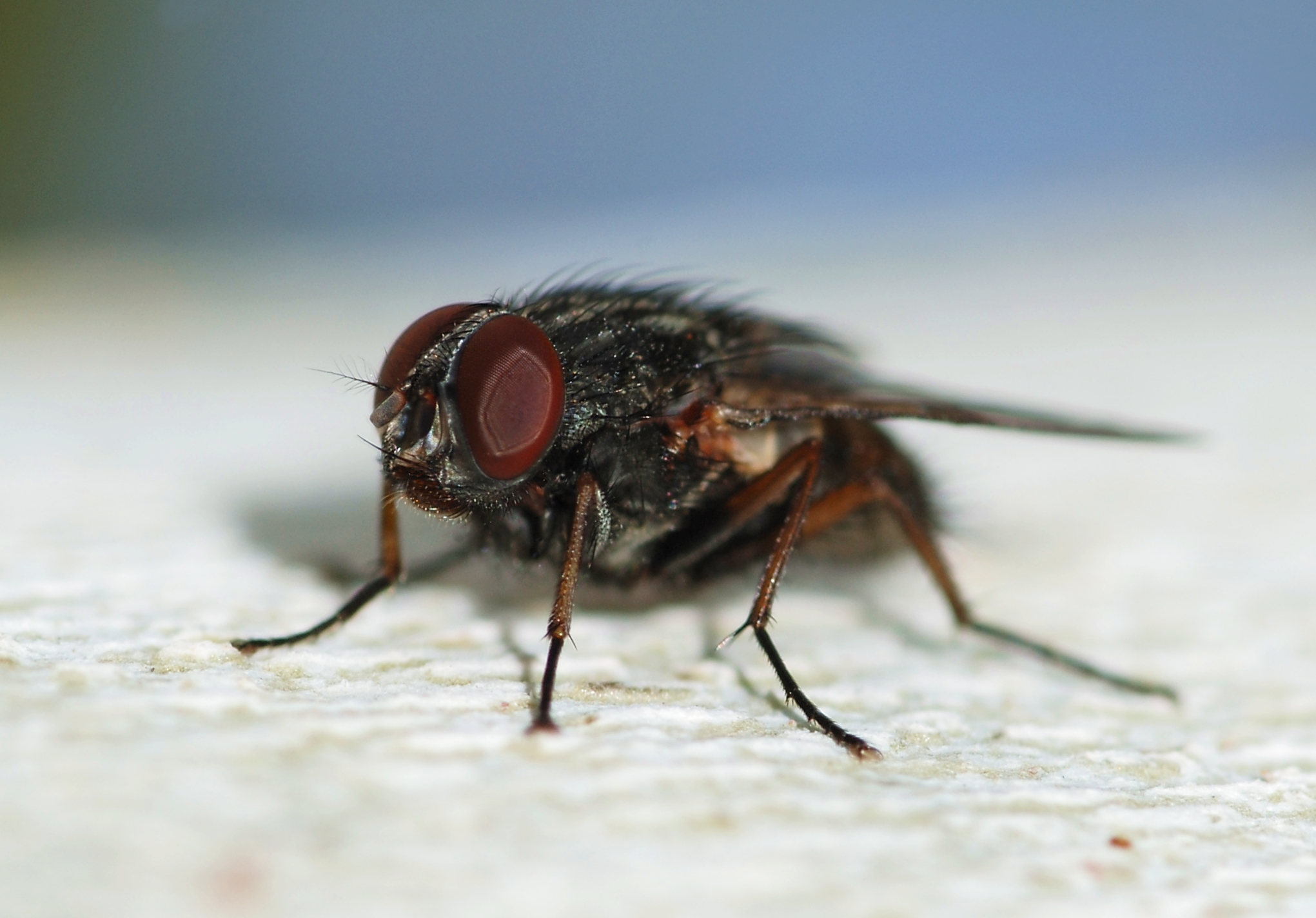
- Muscina stabulans male

Scientific classification
- Kingdom: Animalia
- Phylum: Arthropoda
- Clade: Pancrustacea
- Class: Insecta
- Order: Diptera
- Family: Muscidae
- Genus: Muscina
- Species: M. stabulans

Binomial name
- Muscina stabulans (Fallén, 1817)

Synonyms
- Musca prodeo Harris, 1780; Musca stabulans Fallén, 1817; Muscina prodeo (Harris, 1780)

= Muscina stabulans =

Species of fly

Muscina stabulans (formerly Curtonevra stabulans), commonly known as the false stable fly, is a fly from the family Muscidae.

== Description ==
As an adult, Muscina stabulans has partially reddish-brown legs, four characteristic dark stripes along the thorax region, and a pale spot above the thorax. These flies average 8 millimeters (0.3 inches) in length. The abdomen is either entirely black or black with red sides. Its head ranges in color from a dark-grey to a whitish hue. Circular spiracular plates can be found separated by about one plate's width in the posterior area.

Larvae are dullish-white in colour, 6–7 mm long and 1–1.5 mm wide. They consist of 11 segments, with all but the last having a belt of small, well-developed spines going towards the posterior margins. The pseudo-cephalic segment has two hooks. The posterior spiracles have curved spiracular slits.

== Habitat ==
The false stable fly was found in a study determining synanthropy (ecological association with humans) of adult Muscidae collected in urban, rural and natural environments in Valdivia, Chile. According to the study, M. stabulans are mostly found in rural and natural neighborhoods, and rarely inhabit cities. The distribution of Muscina species tends to be spread throughout the United States. For the most part, M. stabulans is active year-round, but fly activity tends to peak in the summer months, when the number of generation cycles also peak.

The habitat of M. stabulans is similar to that of the house fly, Musca domestica. False stable flies have been spotted in animal housing, such as poultry houses, as well as in the mucosal linings of mammalian intestines. They can be found on carrion in various decomposition stages, but they exhibit a strong preference for the later stages of decomposition. They are able to reach a buried body in shallow ground through several inches of dirt.

== Diet ==
Larvae of false stable fly consume various kinds of decomposing material, including fruit, fungi, excrement and carrion.

== Myiasis ==
There have been rare instances of myiasis linked to M. stabulans. A twenty-year-old male from a rural part of India was reported with a rare case of intestinal myiasis. Symptoms included abdominal discomfort, bloated abdomen, and fecal urgency after meals. His stool sample was watery and contained sparse fecal matter, but it was littered with maggots. A repeat sample two hours later also displayed positive signs of maggots. These maggots were submitted to the Vector Control Research Center (VCRC) in Puducherry and identified as M. stabulans.
