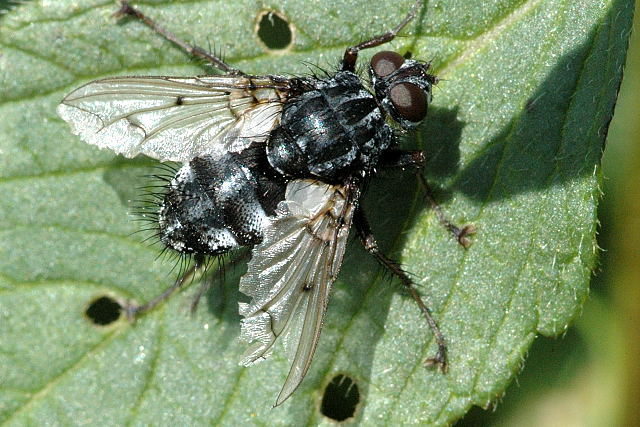
- Trixa conspersa

Scientific classification
- Kingdom: Animalia
- Phylum: Arthropoda
- Class: Insecta
- Order: Diptera
- Family: Tachinidae
- Subfamily: Dexiinae
- Tribe: Dexiini
- Genus: Trixa; Meigen, 1824

Synonyms
- Amsteinia Bremi, 1858; Crameria Robineau-Desvoidy, 1830; Dexiotrix Villeneuve, 1936; Murana Meigen, 1824; Thrixa Pandellé, 1894; Trixella Mesnil, 1980; Trixia Sherborn, 1931

= Trixa =

Genus of flies

Trixa is a genus of flies in the family Tachinidae.

== Species ==
- Trixa alpina Meigen, 1824
- Trixa caerulescens Meigen, 1824
- Trixa chaoi Zhang & Shima, 2005
- Trixa chinensis Zhang & Shima, 2005
- Trixa conspersa (Harris, 1776)
- Trixa familiaris Gistel, 1857
- Trixa longipennis (Villeneuve, 1936)
- Trixa nox (Shima, 1988)
- Trixa pauciseta (Mesnil, 1980)
- Trixa pellucens (Mesnil, 1967)
- Trixa pubiseta (Mesnil, 1967)
- Trixa pyrenaica Villeneuve, 1928
- Trixa rufiventris (Mesnil, 1967)
