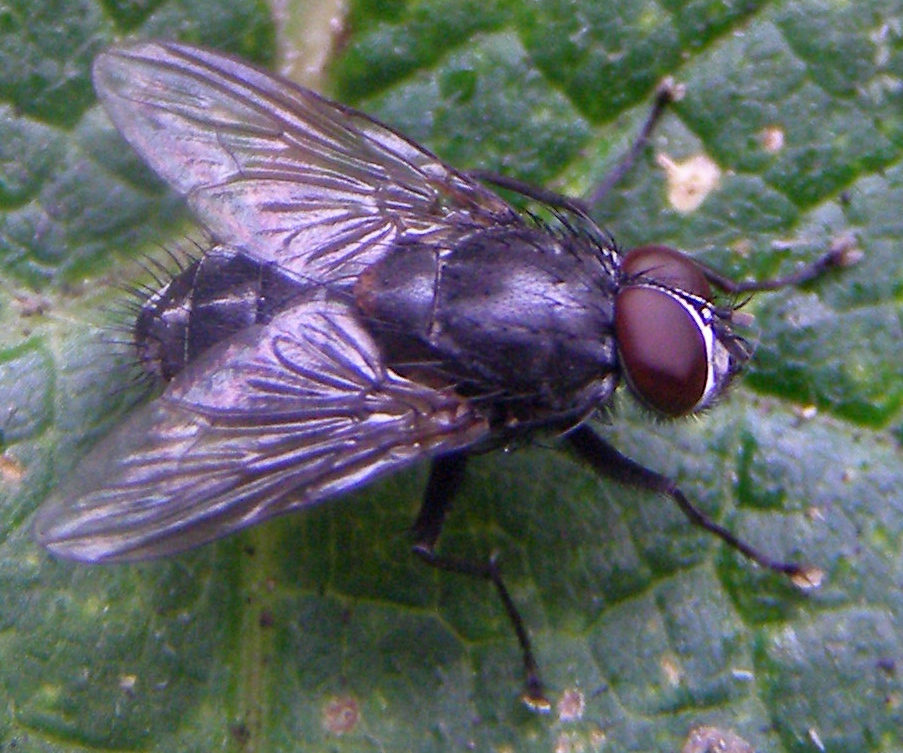
- Muscina levida male

Scientific classification
- Kingdom: Animalia
- Phylum: Arthropoda
- Clade: Pancrustacea
- Class: Insecta
- Order: Diptera
- Family: Muscidae
- Genus: Muscina
- Species: M. levida

Binomial name
- Muscina levida (Harris, 1780)

Synonyms
- Blissonia caesia Robineau-Desvoidy, 1863; Musca assimilis Fallén, 1823; Musca levida Harris, 1780; Muscina assimilis (Fallén, 1823); Muscina caesia (Robineau-Desvoidy, 1863)

= Muscina levida =

Species of fly

Muscina levida is a species of fly from the family Muscidae. It is found in Europe.
