= Hydrotaea houghi =

Scientific classification
- Kingdom: Animalia
- Phylum: Arthropoda
- Class: Insecta
- Order: Diptera
- Family: Muscidae
- Tribe: Azeliini
- Genus: Hydrotaea
- Species: H. houghi

Binomial name
- Hydrotaea houghi Malloch, 1916

Synonyms
- Hydrotaea caerulescens Stein, 1920

Species of fly

Hydrotaea houghi is a species of house flies, etc. in the family Muscidae from North America.
