= Hydrotaea floccosa =

Scientific classification
- Kingdom: Animalia
- Phylum: Arthropoda
- Class: Insecta
- Order: Diptera
- Family: Muscidae
- Tribe: Azeliini
- Genus: Hydrotaea
- Species: H. floccosa

Binomial name
- Hydrotaea floccosa Macquart, 1835

Species of fly

Hydrotaea floccosa is a species of house flies, etc. in the family Muscidae. It is found in Europe.
