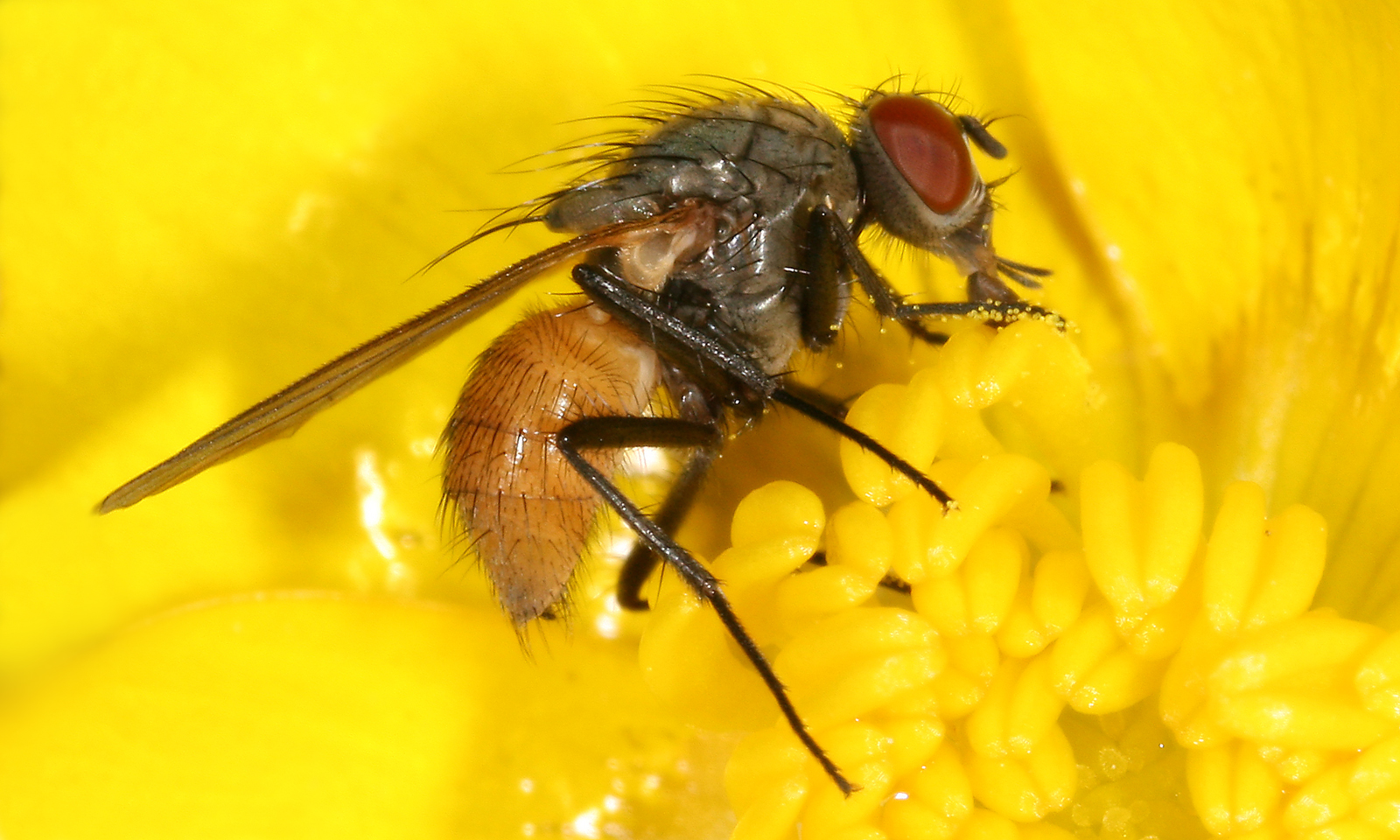
- Thricops semicinereus on Ranunculus acris

Scientific classification
- Kingdom: Animalia
- Phylum: Arthropoda
- Class: Insecta
- Order: Diptera
- Family: Muscidae
- Subfamily: Azeliinae
- Tribe: Azeliini
- Genus: Thricops; Rondani, 1856

Synonyms
- Lasiops Meigen, 1838 (Unav.); Tricophthicus Rondani, 1861; Alloeostylus Schnabl, 1888; Hera Schnabl, 1888; Rhynchotrichops Schnabl, 1889; Lasiothrichops Skidmore, 1985

= Thricops =

Genus of flies

Thricops is a genus of true flies of the family Muscidae.

== Species ==
- Thricops aculeipes (Zetterstedt, 1838)
- Thricops albibasalis (Zetterstedt, 1849)
- Thricops beckeri (Pokorny, 1892)
- Thricops bukowskii (Ringdahl, 1934)
- Thricops calcaratus (Porchinskiy, 1881)
- Thricops coquilletti (Malloch, 1920)
- Thricops culminum (Pokorny, 1889)
- Thricops cunctans (Meigen, 1826)
- Thricops diaphanus (Wiedemann, 1817)
- Thricops fimbriatus (Coquillett, 1904)
- Thricops foveolatus (Zetterstedt, 1845)
- Thricops furcatus (Stein, 1916)
- Thricops genarum (Zetterstedt, 1838)
- Thricops hirtulus (Zetterstedt, 1838)
- Thricops ineptus (Stein, 1920)
- Thricops innocuus (Zetterstedt, 1838)
- Thricops lividiventris (Zetterstedt, 1845)
- Thricops longipes (Zetterstedt, 1845)
- Thricops medius (Stein, 1920)
- Thricops nigrifrons (Robineau-Desvoidy, 1830)
- Thricops nigritellus (Zetterstedt, 1838)
- Thricops rostratus (Meade, 1882)
- Thricops rufisquamus (Schnabl, 1915)
- Thricops semicinereus (Wiedemann, 1817)
- Thricops separ (Zetterstedt, 1845)
- Thricops septentrionalis (Stein, 1898)
- Thricops simplex (Wiedemann, 1817)
- Thricops spiniger (Stein, 1904)
- Thricops sudeticus (Schnabl, 1888)
- Thricops tarsalis (Walker, 1853)
- Thricops tatricus Gregor, 1988
- Thricops villicrura (Coquillett, 1900)
- Thricops villosus (Hendel, 1903)
