= Hydrotaea armipes =

Scientific classification
- Kingdom: Animalia
- Phylum: Arthropoda
- Class: Insecta
- Order: Diptera
- Family: Muscidae
- Tribe: Azeliini
- Genus: Hydrotaea
- Species: H. armipes

Binomial name
- Hydrotaea armipes (Fallen, 1825)

Synonyms
- Anthomyia idyla Walker, 1849; Anthomyia occulta Meigen, 1826; Eriphia lata Walker, 1849; Musca armipes Fallen, 1825

Species of fly

Hydrotaea armipes is a species of house flies, etc. in the family Muscidae. It is found in Europe.
