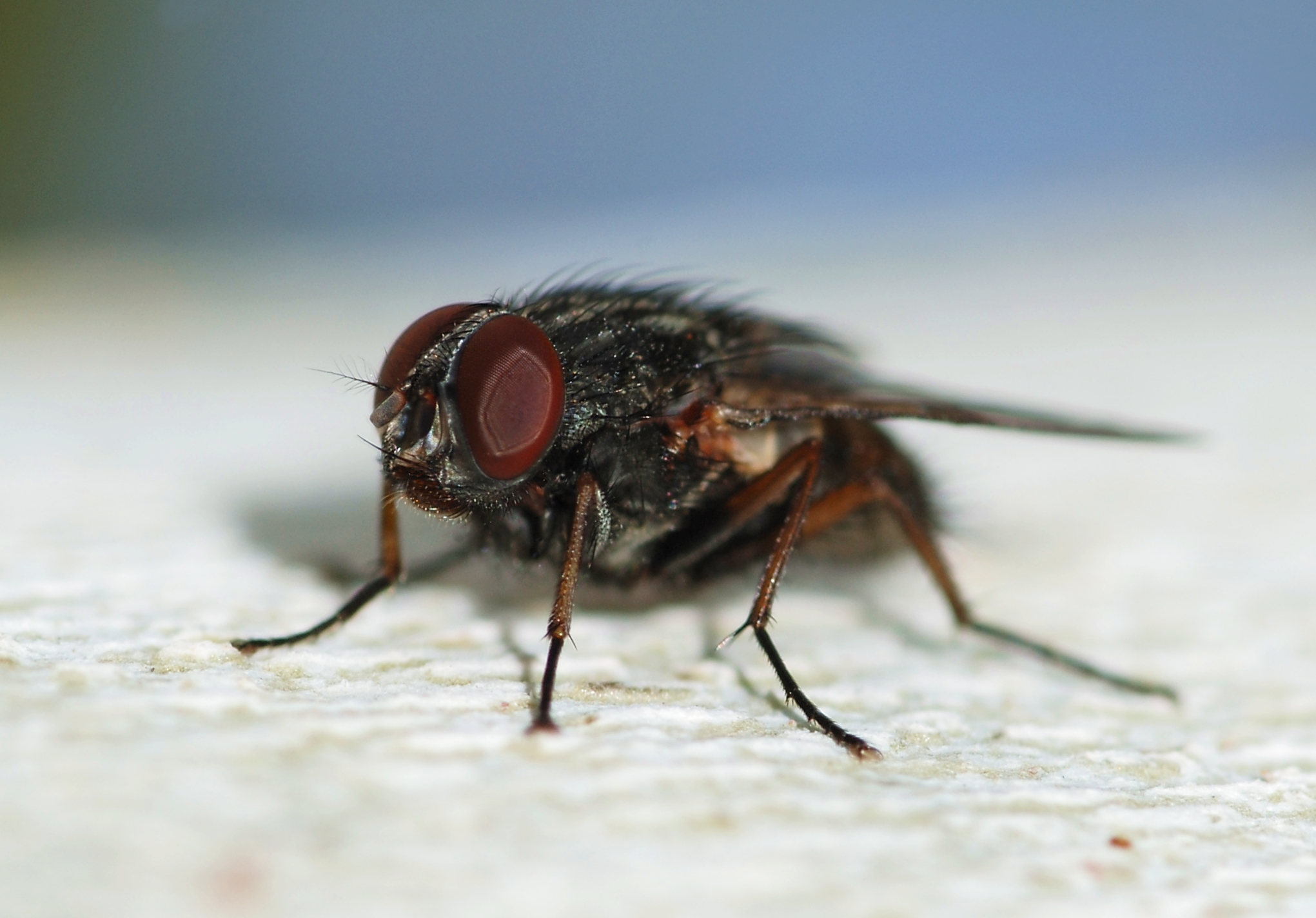
- Adult Muscina stabulans

Scientific classification
- Kingdom: Animalia
- Phylum: Arthropoda
- Clade: Pancrustacea
- Class: Insecta
- Order: Diptera
- Family: Muscidae
- Subfamily: Azeliinae
- Tribe: Reinwardtiini
- Genus: Muscina; Robineau-Desvoidy, 1830

Type species
- M. stabulans Fallén, 1817

= Muscina =

Genus of flies

Muscina is a genus of flies that belongs to the family Muscidae, currently consisting of 27 species. They are worldwide in distribution and are frequently found in livestock facilities and outside restrooms. The most common species are M. stabulans (the most widely studied species), M. levida, and M. prolapsa. Muscina flies commonly breed in manure and defecate on food, which has been linked to the spread of some disease and illnesses. The occurrence of Muscina larvae on dead bodies has led to their regular use in forensic investigations, as they may be used to estimate the time of death. Research have shown the prevalence of certain species of Muscina flies as vectors of diseases such as poliomyelitis.

== Characteristics ==
Muscina species are characterized by a retractable proboscis, sponging or sucking mouthparts, and a pale tip on the scutellum. The species M. stabulans and M. levida are larger than the housefly, and have moderately curved fourth veins with the latter also having a black palpi. The species M. levida has legs that are entirely black. M. pascuorum flies have a red palpi, a strongly curved fourth vein that ends in or before the wing tip, and are generally larger than M. levida.

== Life cycle ==
Muscina species undergo the same transformations throughout the life cycle as similar species and families in the order Diptera. Flies in the Dipteran order undergo what is known as holometabolous transformation, a type of metabolic transformation in which an insect starts out as an egg, undergoes larval stages, and then pupates before reaching full adulthood. The adult insect is referred to as an imago.

=== Eggs and larvae ===
Flies are completely wingless at the beginning of development. In normal fly production there can be as many as 250 eggs laid by a mature female. The adult female keeps the eggs inside the abdomen until all of the eggs are produced and then lays the eggs through an ovipositor located on the hind end of the abdomen.

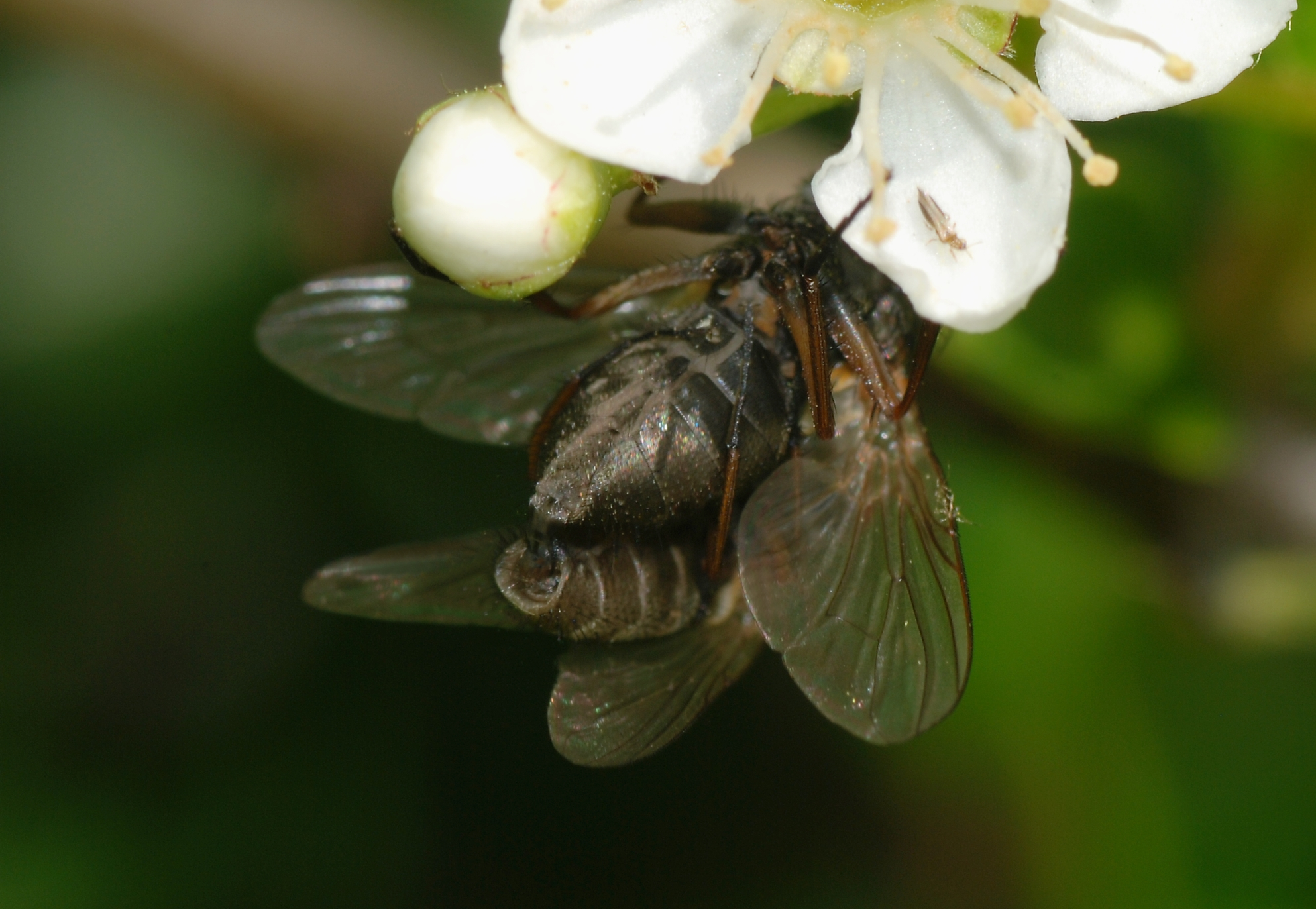
Muscina flies mating

These eggs are very small in size. Female adult flies usually choose decaying matter as sites to lay the eggs. These nutrient-rich areas are ideal for the growth and development of the hatching larvae. In contrast to adult flies, the larvae do not have a definite head. Instead, there are two grasping hooks that they use to cut and tear food. The larvae of Muscina have 11 segments. At the posterior end of the larvae are a set of spiracles. The spiracles of Muscina have spiracular slits that are not straight and exhibit some form of curvature. Larvae use the spiracles to breathe. The spiracles have a number of slits that can be used to determine what instar, or larval stage, the larvae are in; for example, one slit means first instar, two slits means second instar, and three slits means third instar. It has been shown that the environmental temperature has a strong influence on larval development: increasing temperature directly influences the amount of time that the larvae need to complete development.

=== Pupa ===
After the larval phase, the Muscina larvae pass through a pupal stage. In this stage, there are many transformations that occur, such as the formation of legs, head, and wings. Simultaneously, a protective layer builds up and forms a cocoon, which aids in protection of the vital organs of the fly. M. levida is a species in this genus that does not form a cocoon. The duration of the pupal stage also varies depending on the temperature of the surrounding environment.

=== Adults ===
After sufficient time for pupal development has elapsed, the fly will be able to break out of its hard pupa shell, and the fly's wings begin to spread. Although completely formed in the pupa stage, the adult's wings do not reach its full size until outside the pupa covering. Through the use of blood vessels inside the wings, the fly is able to expand to full width and length and complete its life cycle.

== Medical importance ==
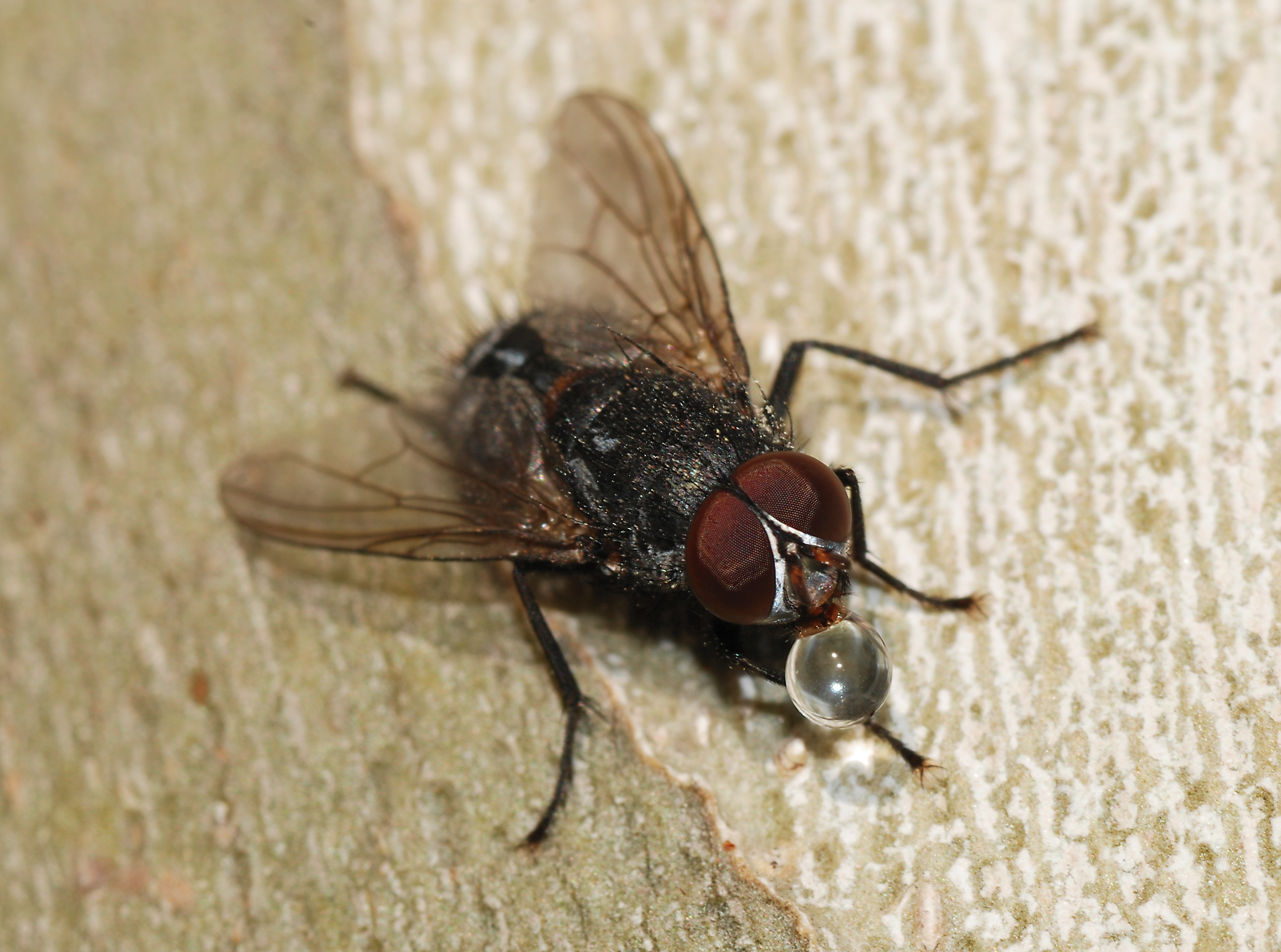
Muscina fly with a drop of regurgitated fluid

Some insects have been shown to be potential carriers of pathogenic agents that can cause diseases. Mosquitoes and ticks as well as certain species of Muscina flies have been revealed to be possible vectors. M. stabulans, along with almost two dozen other species of flies have been named the “disease-causing flies.” Species of flies such as M. stabulans can spread bacterial and viral pathogens via transfer from its feet or mouthparts. Adult female flies tend to lay eggs in decaying material such as food or dead organisms and fresh fecal material. The fecal material houses a vast number of pathogenic bacteria, viruses, protozoan and other disease-causing agents. Most of the bacteria and viruses are not introduced from the fecal material to the fly when in the egg or larvae form; rather, the transfer occurs in the transition of a young fly to adulthood. Fecal particles attach to the fly's outer body as it emerges from the larvae. Transfer of bacteria occurs when the fly takes off and lands on an open wound or food material. Physical contact flakes the pathogen off the fly's body and causes contamination. The spread of a pathogen by means of a fly's outer body, such as its feet, to the host, is referred to as mechanical transmission. It is possible to determine the identify pathogen carried by identifying the species of fly. In these instances, food sanitation is an important preventive measure to ensure food safety. Moreover, a study of flies including M. stabulans and M. levida has shown that fly incidence peaked about 4–5 months before the occurrence of a poliomyelitis epidemic. This time period matches the time it takes for the infective agent to incubate in a human plus the extra time necessary for the fly to acquire and incubate the virus in its body.

== Forensic importance ==
M. stabulans and M. levida belong to the ecological group of the filth fly. Muscina flies are attracted to decaying organic matter, and are commonly found on corpses, urine, and feces. Muscina flies are useful in determining post-mortem intervals. The presence of Muscina larvae in diapers and on genitalia can indicate a timeline for the period of neglect in infant or elderly death cases. From the second instar phase onwards, M. stabulans are predacious upon other larvae, and will eat other forensically important arthropods. Presence of the false stable fly larvae on buried bodies enables investigators to estimate the time of death. The antennae of the false stable fly can detect buried bodies. In these cases, the fly lays its eggs on top of the soil, and the hatching larvae will then burrow and invade the corpse. The false stable fly will also lay its eggs in blood, even in the absence of a body. The presence of eggs in blood allows entomologists to estimate the time of injury, which helps investigators and crime scene investigators. Muscina stabulans are found on corpses in autumn and winter. In one experiment, M. stabulans larvae were found on a rabbit corpse two days after death. M. stabulans are present in the fresh stage, but are predominantly found in the adipocere-like stage, characterized by the hydrolysis of the carcass’ fatty tissue. In this phase, the carcass loses its shape and is a mass of hair, fat, skin, and cartilage. The skin eventually becomes rigid, protecting the larvae on the carcass and the insects living underneath the carcass.

== Myiasis ==
Myiasis is the feeding on live humans and vertebrates by dipterous fly larvae.

=== Human ===
Muscina flies are rarely seen on the skin of living mammals, but there has been one reported case where a Muscina species alone caused cutaneous myiasis in a human. A nine-year-old girl from Minnesota was reported with a lump on her wrist that was reddened and elevated, but showed no signs of any external openings or of containing any pus inside. A vaseline bandage was applied after some blood was extracted, and the lump was soaked in hot water several times. Twelve hours later, a worm was found in the cut after removing the bandage. Several other small lesions were noticeable around the proximity of the cut, but they receded at about this time. The girl recovered after applying a hot pack to the lesion. The larvae were confirmed by M. T. James of the State College of Washington and C. W. Sabrosky and W. W. Wirth of the United States National Museum to be a Muscina fly, most likely M. levida.

Muscina stabulans was reported in a case of intestinal myiasis. A twenty-year-old Indian man experienced abdominal discomfort, bloated abdomen, and intestinal hurrying after meals. Larvae of M. stabulans were found in the man's stool.

=== Sheep ===
In certain parts of the world where sheep production is important, ovine myiasis by certain dipteran species is a major concern. Areas where ruminant myiasis are problematic are Australia, Southern Africa, and the British Isles. M. prolapsa along with other dipteran flies have been identified in cases in southwestern Scotland.

== Ongoing research ==
Current research have delved into the role Muscina flies play in forensics. Muscina stabulans was found to be an important fly in the determination of post-mortem intervals (PMI) in the Rio Grande do Sul state in southern Brazil. M. stabulans show up during the adipocere-like stage of decomposition whereby the carcass loses its natural shape due to hydrolysis of the fatty tissue. Moreover, M. stabulans appearance on bodies in large numbers during the autumn and winter months is useful in narrowing down time of death.

== Species ==
Muscina prolapsa

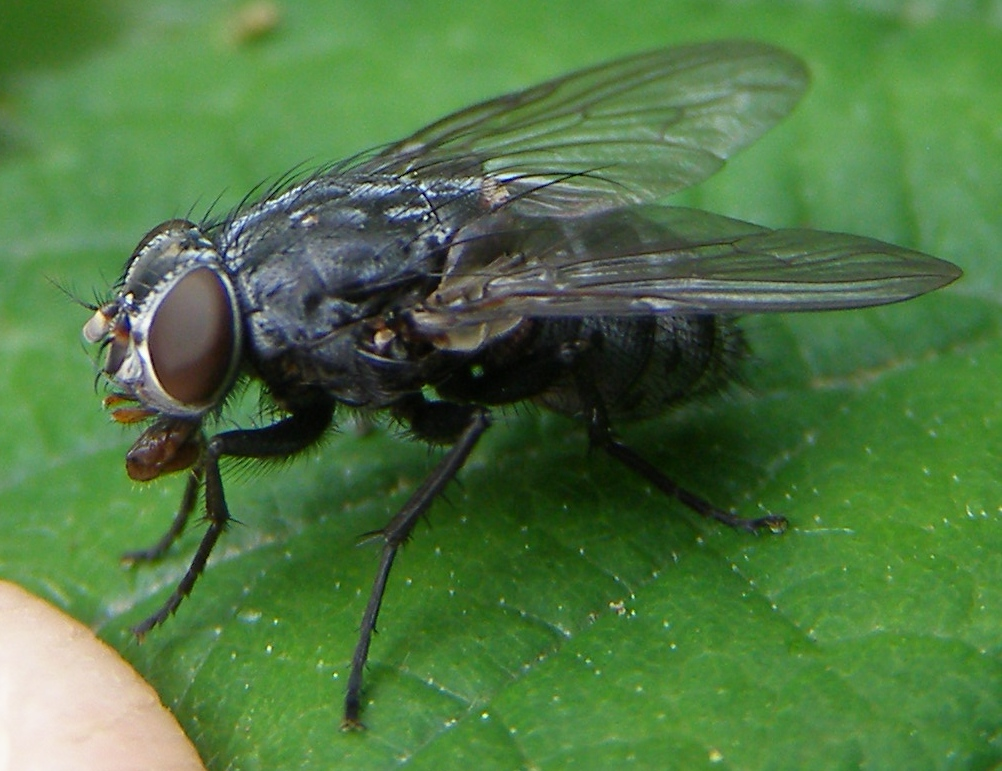
Female

Muscina levida

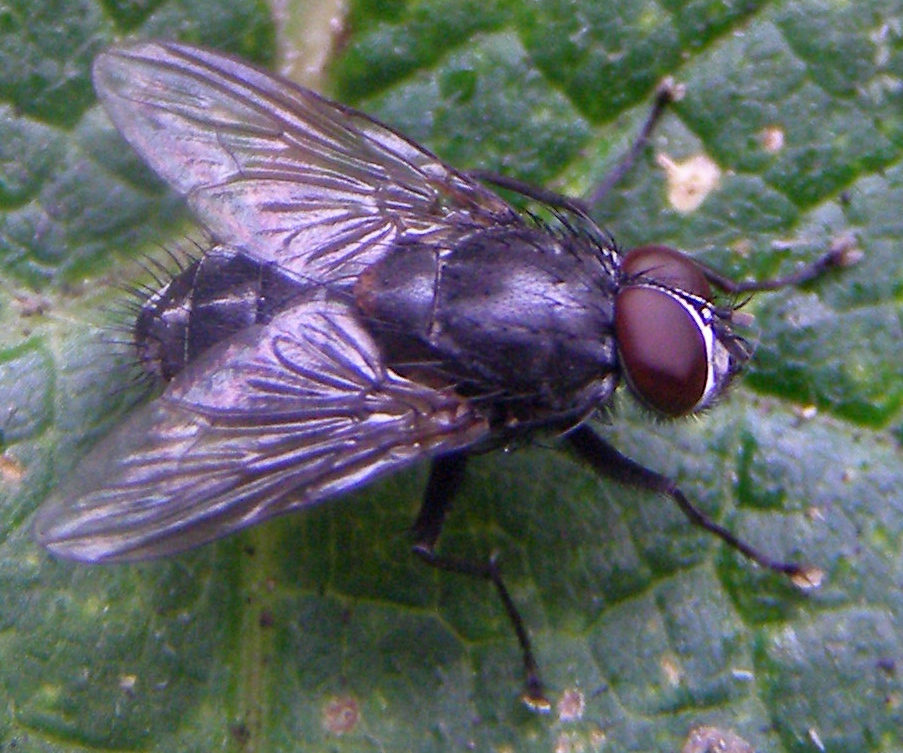
Male

- Muscina angustifrons Loew, 1858
- Muscina arcuata Shinonaga, 1989
- Muscina aurantiaca Hough, 1899
- Muscina brunnea
- Muscina concolor
- Muscina dorsilinea Wulp, 1896
- Muscina flukei Snyder, 1956
- Muscina fulvacrura Snyder, 1956
- Muscina fungivora Robineau-Desvoidy, 1830
- Muscina grisea
- Muscina heterochaeta Villeneuve, 1915
- Muscina japonica Shinonaga, 1974
- Muscina krivosheinae Lobanov, 1977
- Muscina latipennis
- Muscina levida (Harris, 1780)
- Muscina longicornis
- Muscina minor Portschinsky, 1881
- Muscina pascuorum Meigen, 1826
- Muscina principalis Schiner, 1868
- Muscina prolapsa (Harris, 1780)
- Muscina stabulans Fallén, 1817
- Muscina sumatrensis Shinonaga & Kurahashi, 2002
- Muscina texana
- Muscina tripunctata Wulp, 1896
- Muscina varicolor
