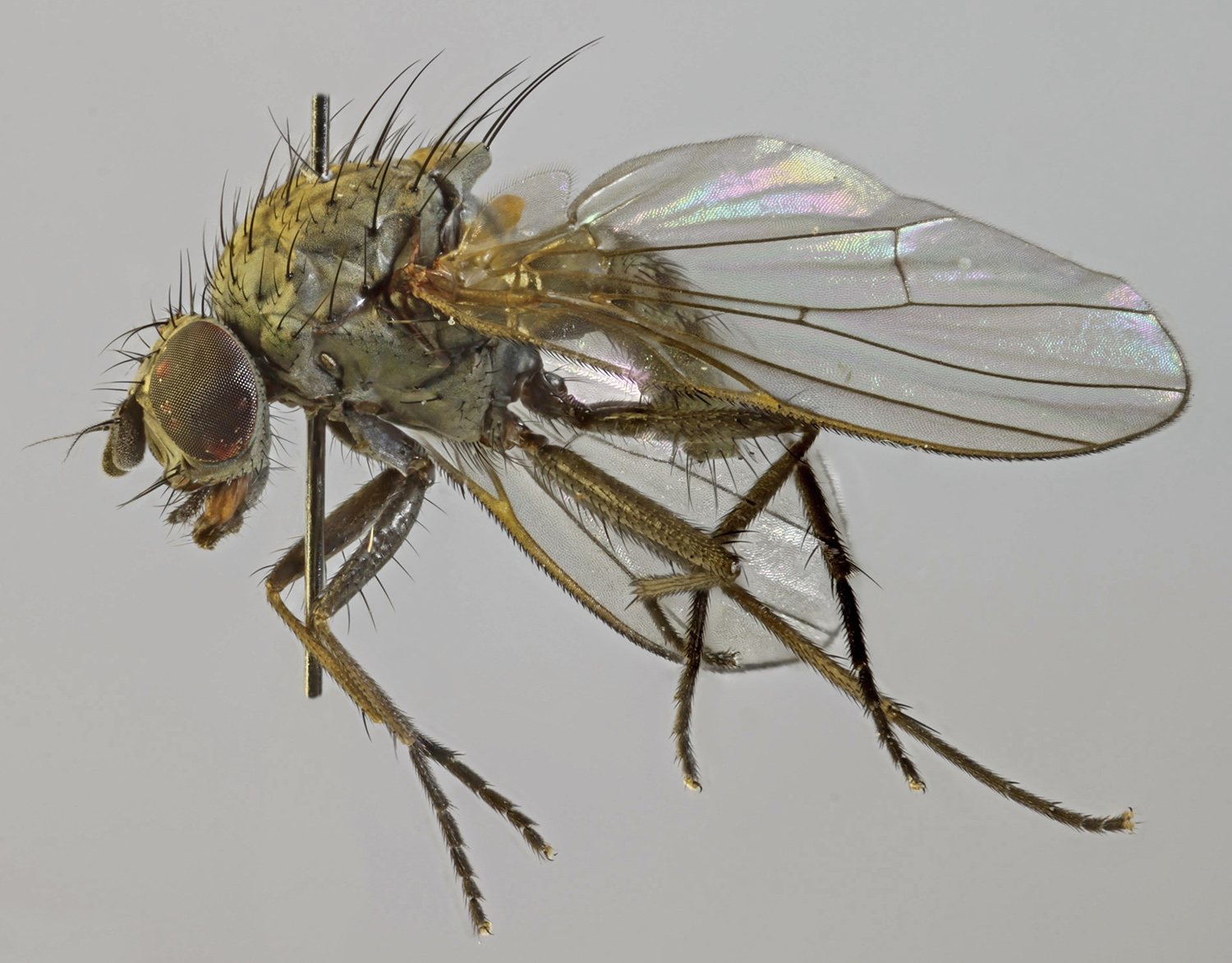
- Azelia cilipes

Scientific classification
- Kingdom: Animalia
- Phylum: Arthropoda
- Class: Insecta
- Order: Diptera
- Family: Muscidae
- Subfamily: Azeliinae
- Tribe: Azeliini
- Genus: Azelia; Robineau-Desvoidy, 1830

Type species
- Azelia florea Robineau-Desvoidy, 1830

Synonyms
- Atomogaster Macquart, 1835; Athomogaster Rondani, 1866; Parazelia Bigot, 1882; Fraseria Malloch, 1932; Prohydrotaea Emden, 1951

= Azelia =

Genus of flies

Azelia is a genus of flies belonging to the family Muscidae.

== Species ==
- Azelia aterrima (Meigen, 1826)
- Azelia cilipes (Haliday, 1838)
- Azelia fasciata (Emden, 1951)
- Azelia gibbera (Meigen, 1826)
- Azelia monodactyla Loew, 1874
- Azelia nebulosa Robineau-Desvoidy, 1830
- Azelia neotropica Snyder, 1957
- Azelia parva Rondani, 1866
- Azelia plumitibia Feng, Fan & Zeng, 1999
- Azelia spinosa Vikhrev, 2015
- Azelia triquetra (Wiedemann, 1817)
- Azelia unguigera Vikhrev, 2015
- Azelia zetterstedtii Rondani, 1866
