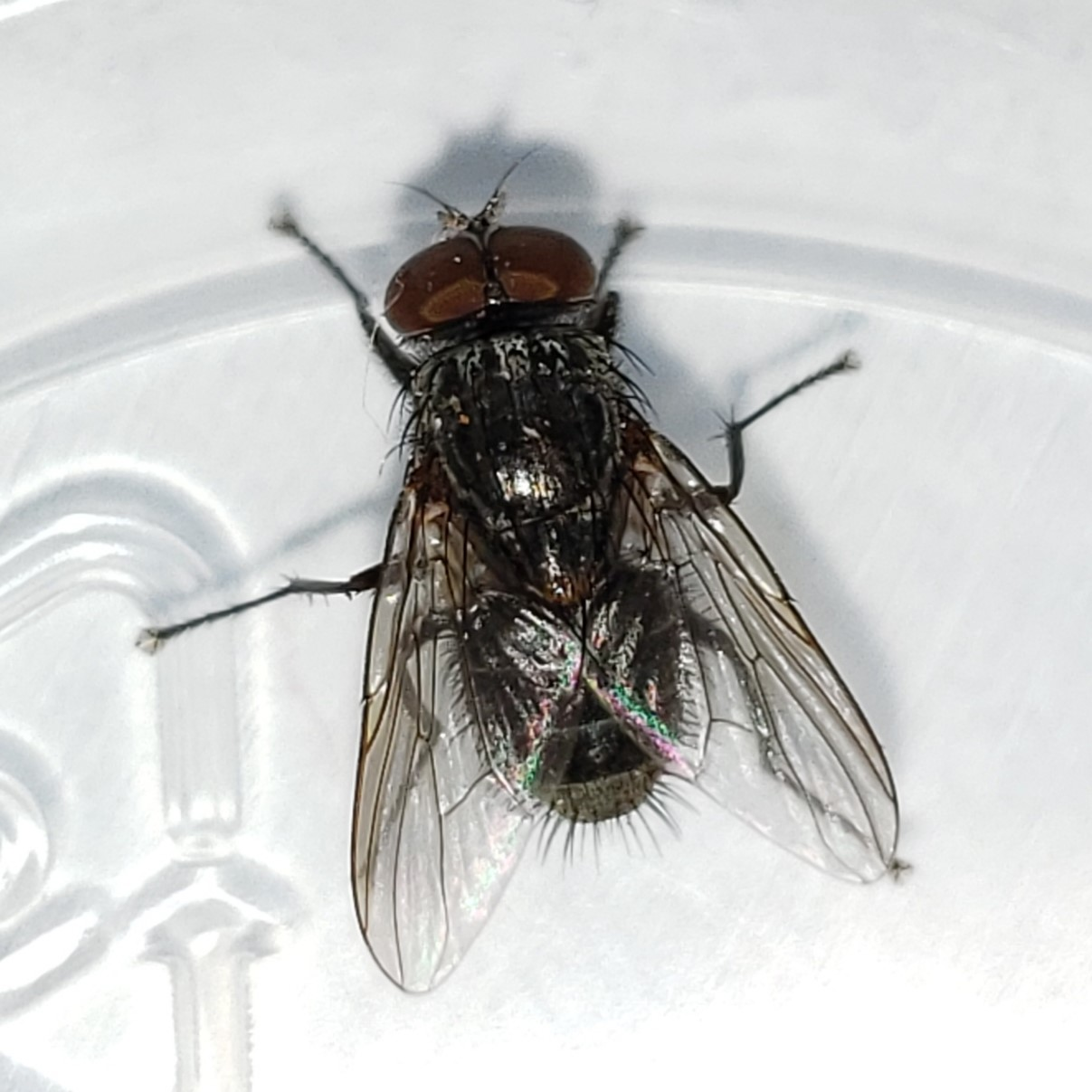

Scientific classification
- Kingdom: Animalia
- Phylum: Arthropoda
- Class: Insecta
- Order: Diptera
- Family: Muscidae
- Tribe: Reinwardtiini
- Genus: Muscina
- Species: M. dorsilinea

Binomial name
- Muscina dorsilinea (Wulp, 1896)

Synonyms
- Clinopera dorsilinea Wulp, 1896; Muscina aurantiaca Hough, 1899

= Muscina dorsilinea =

Species of fly

Muscina dorsilinea is a species of house fly in the family Muscidae.
