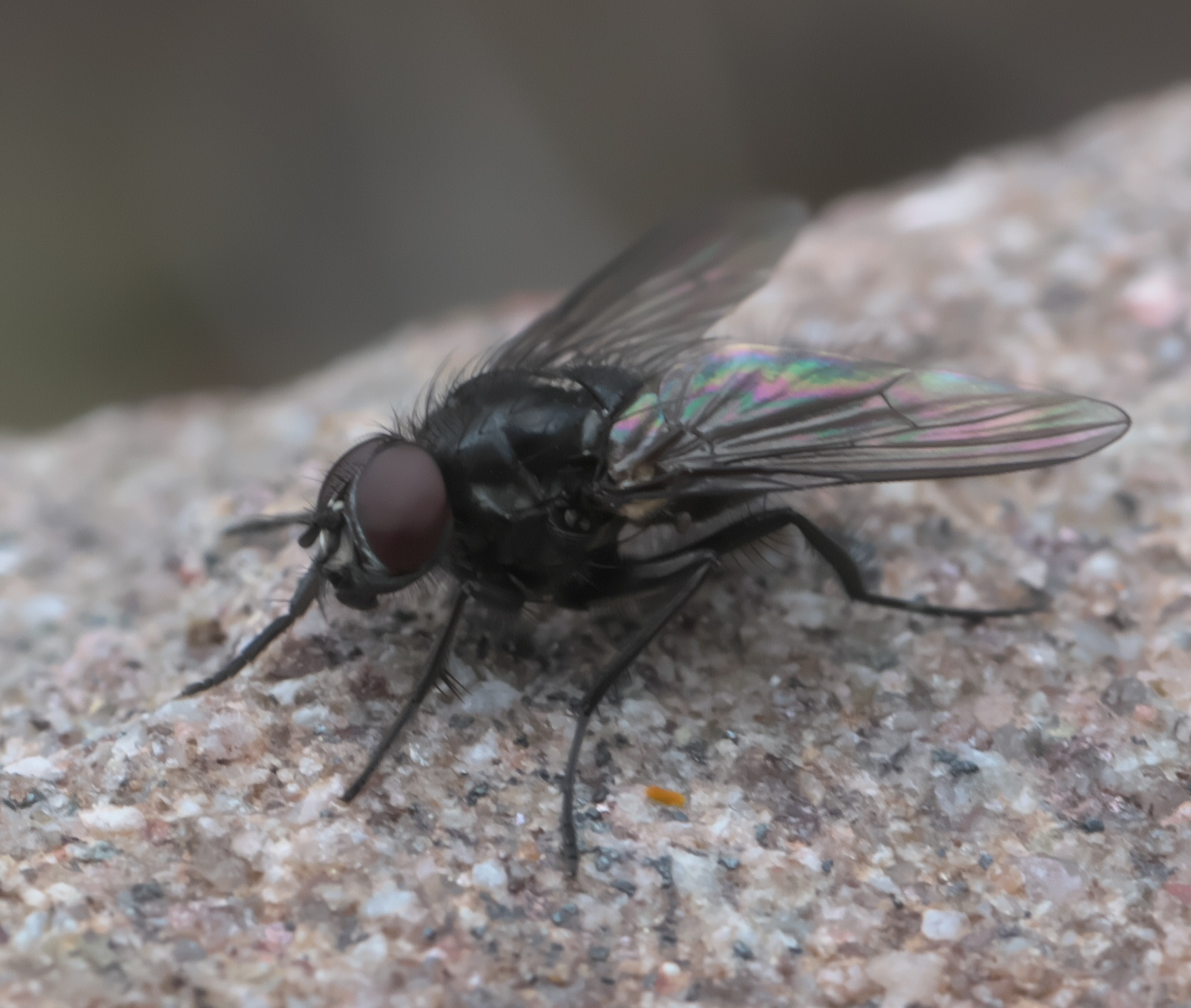

Scientific classification
- Domain: Eukaryota
- Kingdom: Animalia
- Phylum: Arthropoda
- Class: Insecta
- Order: Diptera
- Family: Muscidae
- Tribe: Azeliini
- Genus: Thricops
- Species: T. septentrionalis

Binomial name
- Thricops septentrionalis (Stein, 1898)

Synonyms
- Aricia septentrionalis Stein, 1898

= Thricops septentrionalis =

Species of fly

Thricops septentrionalis is a species of house fly in the family Muscidae.

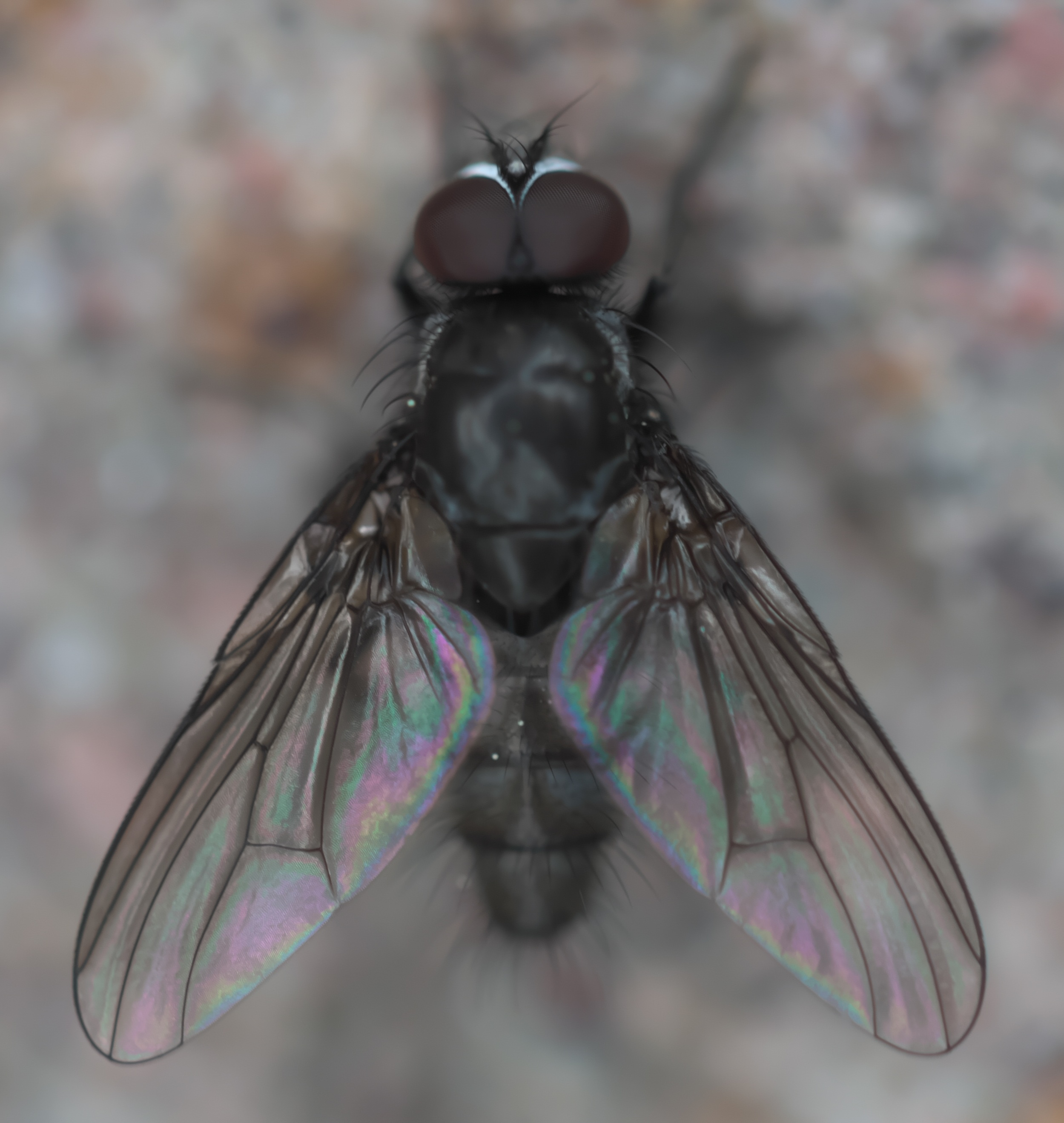
