= John Harris (painter) =

British painter

- Occupation: Painter

John Harris (died 1834) was a British watercolor painter.

== Biography ==
Harris was one of the earliest artists who produced tinted drawings. He exhibited at the Royal Academy from 1802 to 1815, and made some designs for illustrations. He is probably identical with John Harris, a freemason, who executed some masonic plates in lithography in 1825, and in 1833 published a lithograph from a drawing taken on the spot, 7 July 1833, of the ‘Raising of the Block of Granite which forms the Pediment of the Porch for New Bridewell in Tothill Fields.’ Harris died in 1834. His father was Moses Harris.
