= Hydrotaea militaris =

Scientific classification
- Kingdom: Animalia
- Phylum: Arthropoda
- Class: Insecta
- Order: Diptera
- Family: Muscidae
- Genus: Hydrotaea
- Species: H. militaris

Binomial name
- Hydrotaea militaris (Meigen, 1826)

Synonyms
- Anthomyia militaris Meigen, 1826; Hydrotaea impexa Loew, 1873

Species of fly

Hydrotaea militaris is a species of fly in the family Muscidae.
