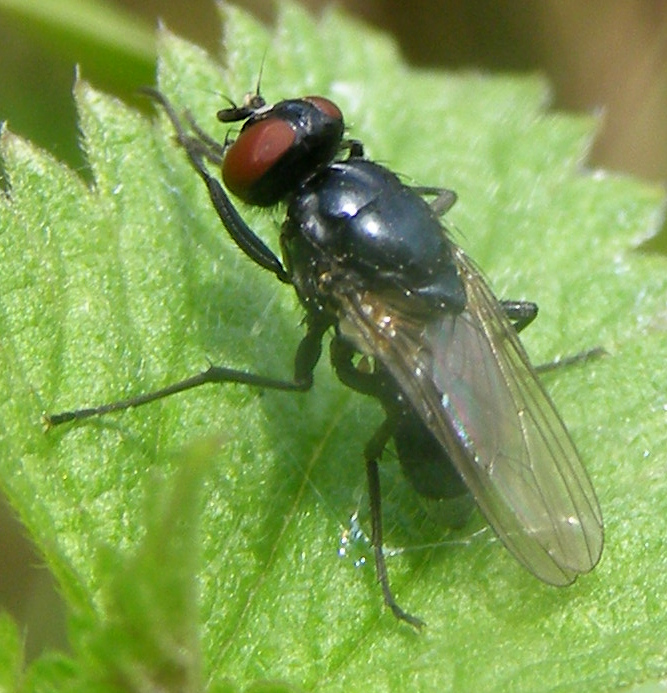
- Female Hydrotaea diabolus

Scientific classification
- Kingdom: Animalia
- Phylum: Arthropoda
- Clade: Pancrustacea
- Class: Insecta
- Order: Diptera
- Family: Muscidae
- Genus: Hydrotaea
- Species: H. diabolus

Binomial name
- Hydrotaea diabolus (Harris, 1780)

Synonyms
- Anthomyia bimaculata Meigen, 1826; Musca ciliata Fabricius, 1794; Musca diabolus Harris, 1780; Musca spinipes Fallén, 1823

= Hydrotaea diabolus =

Species of fly

Hydrotaea diabolus is a fly of the family Muscidae. Its larvae have been found in pig, cow and horse manure. It is found in the Palearctic.

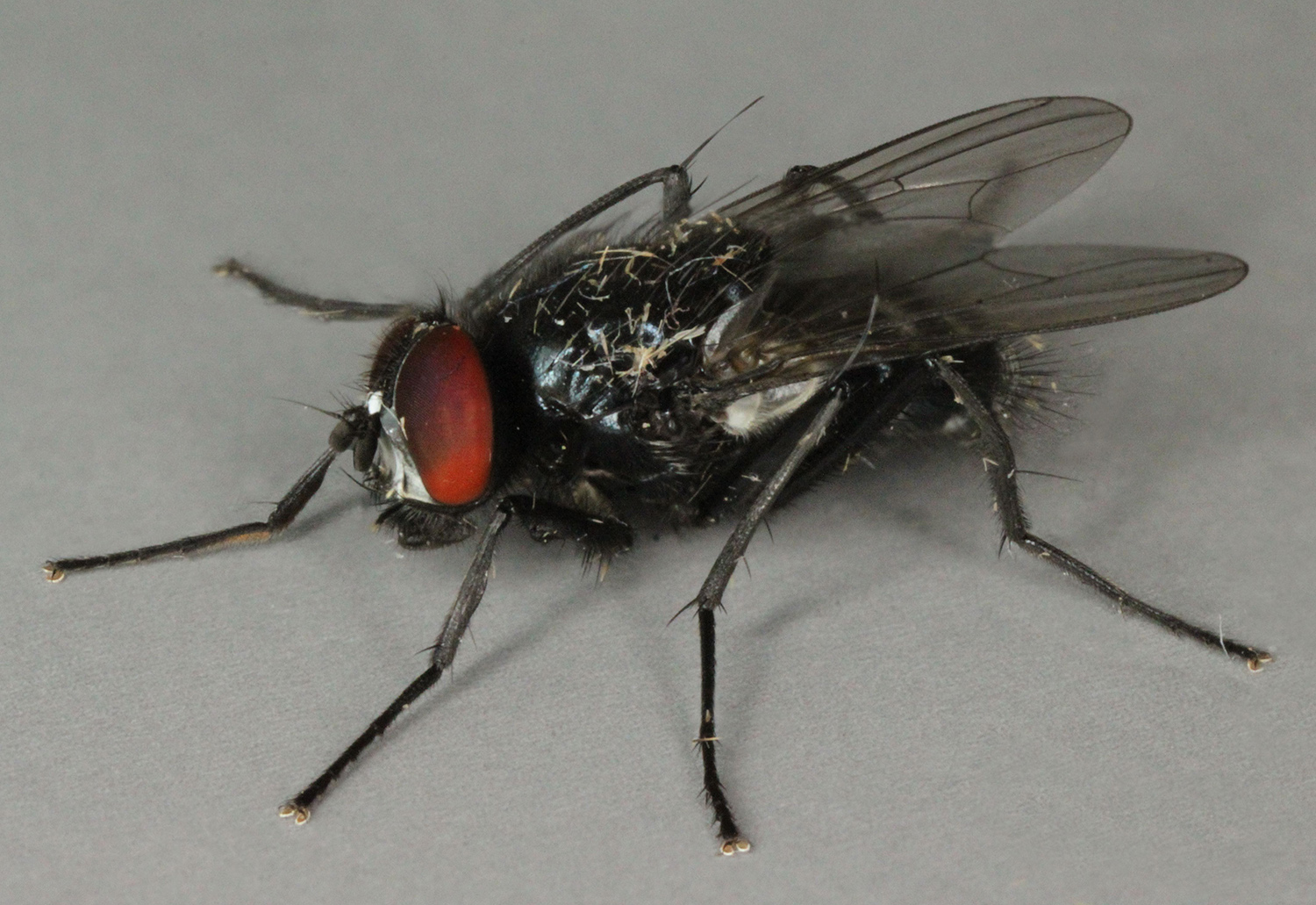
Hydrotaea diabolus
