= Trixa alpina =

Scientific classification
- Kingdom: Animalia
- Phylum: Arthropoda
- Class: Insecta
- Order: Diptera
- Family: Tachinidae
- Subfamily: Dexiinae
- Tribe: Dexiini
- Genus: Trixa
- Species: T. alpina

Binomial name
- Trixa alpina Meigen, 1824

Species of fly

Trixa alpina is a species of fly in the family Tachinidae.

== Distribution ==
Czech Republic, Romania, Slovakia, Finland, Norway, Sweden, Italy, Austria, Germany, Switzerland, Russia.
