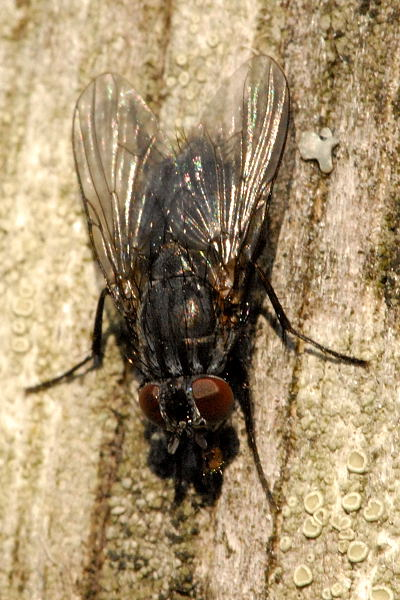
- Hydrotaea dentipes female

Scientific classification
- Kingdom: Animalia
- Phylum: Arthropoda
- Clade: Pancrustacea
- Class: Insecta
- Order: Diptera
- Family: Muscidae
- Genus: Hydrotaea
- Species: H. dentipes

Binomial name
- Hydrotaea dentipes (Fabricius, 1805)

Synonyms
- Musca dentipes Fabricius, 1805

= Hydrotaea dentipes =

Species of fly

Hydrotaea dentipes is a fly from the family Muscidae. Its larvae have been found in the dung of rabbits, pigs, cows, horses, chickens and humans. It is found in the Palearctic.

== Description ==
See Morphology of Diptera for terms. The thorax, seen from behind, with conspicuous whitish dusting at least in front of the suture. The middle tibia, anteriorly along almost whole length, with dense fine pubescence which is shorter than width of tibia. The discal vein of wing with a slight though distinct curve forward just before apex. Hind tibia with only 2–3 rather short anteroventral bristles. Middle femur, at base beneath, with numerous setulose hairs, many of which are more than twice as long as depth of femur. 6·5–7·75 mm.

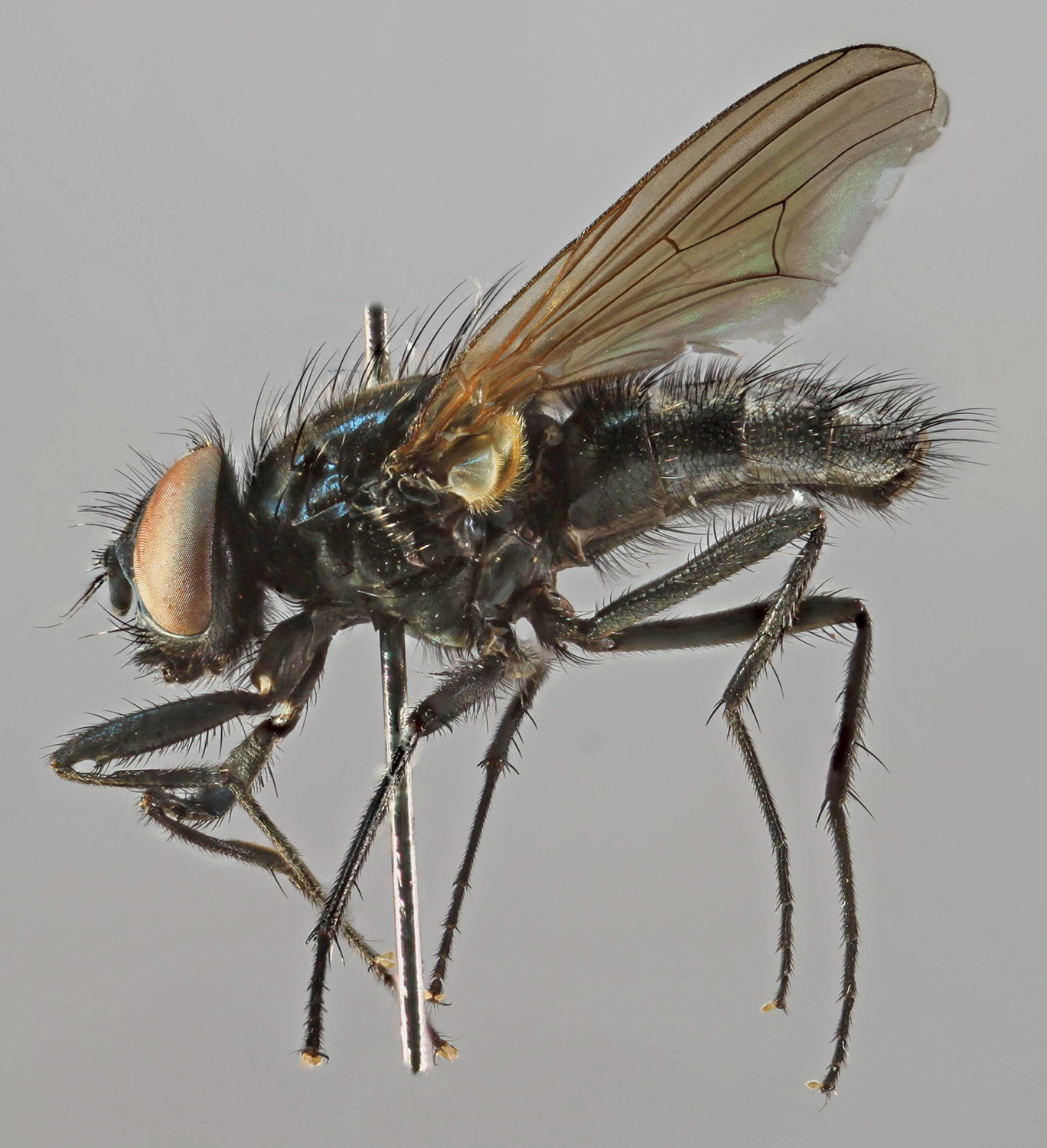
Hydrotaea dentipes
