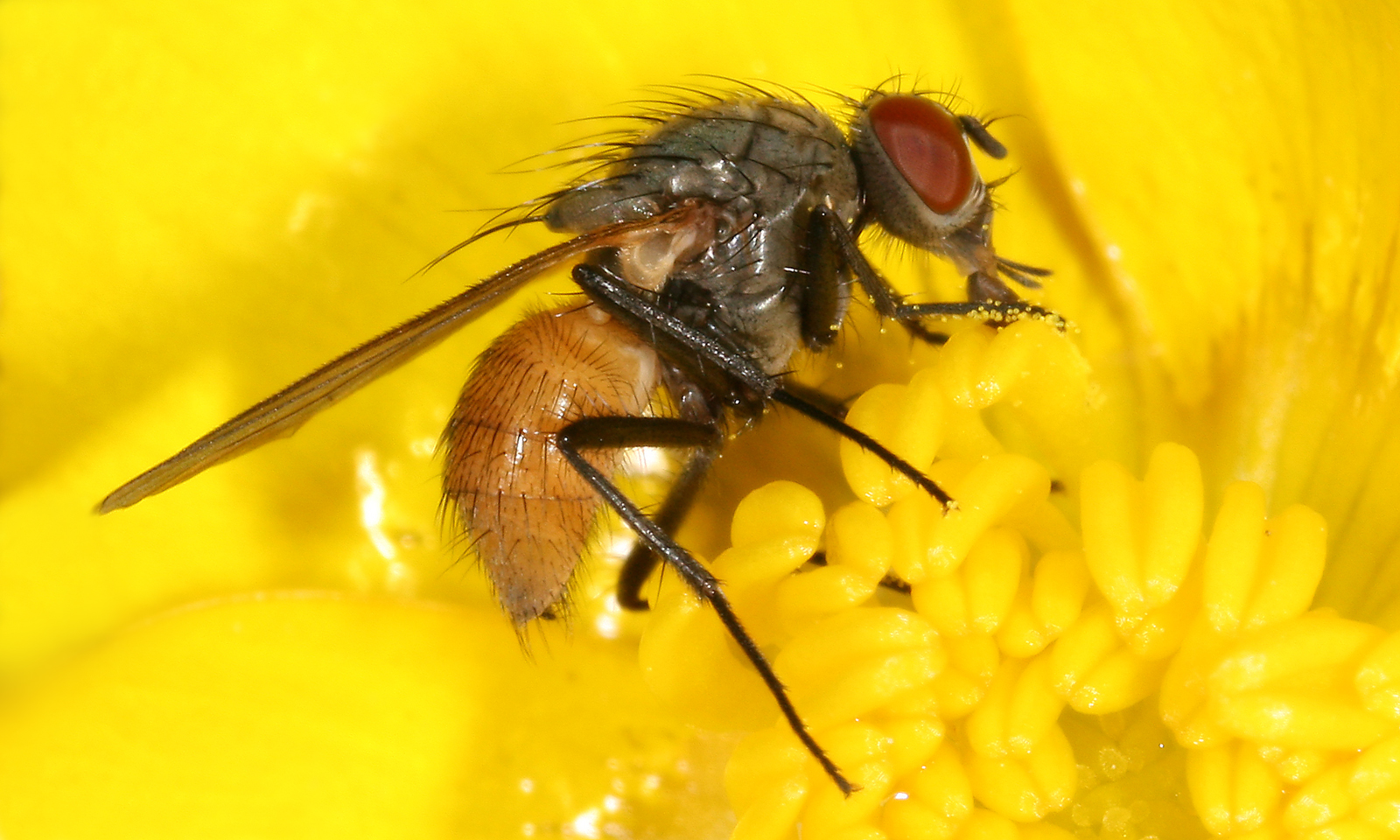
- Thricops semicinereus on Ranunculus acris

Scientific classification
- Kingdom: Animalia
- Phylum: Arthropoda
- Class: Insecta
- Order: Diptera
- Family: Muscidae
- Genus: Thricops
- Species: T. semicinereus

Binomial name
- Thricops semicinereus (Wiedemann, 1817)

Synonyms
- Anthomyia semicinereus Wiedemann, 1817

= Thricops semicinereus =

Species of fly

Thricops semicinereus is a species of fly which is widely distribution across the Palaearctic.
