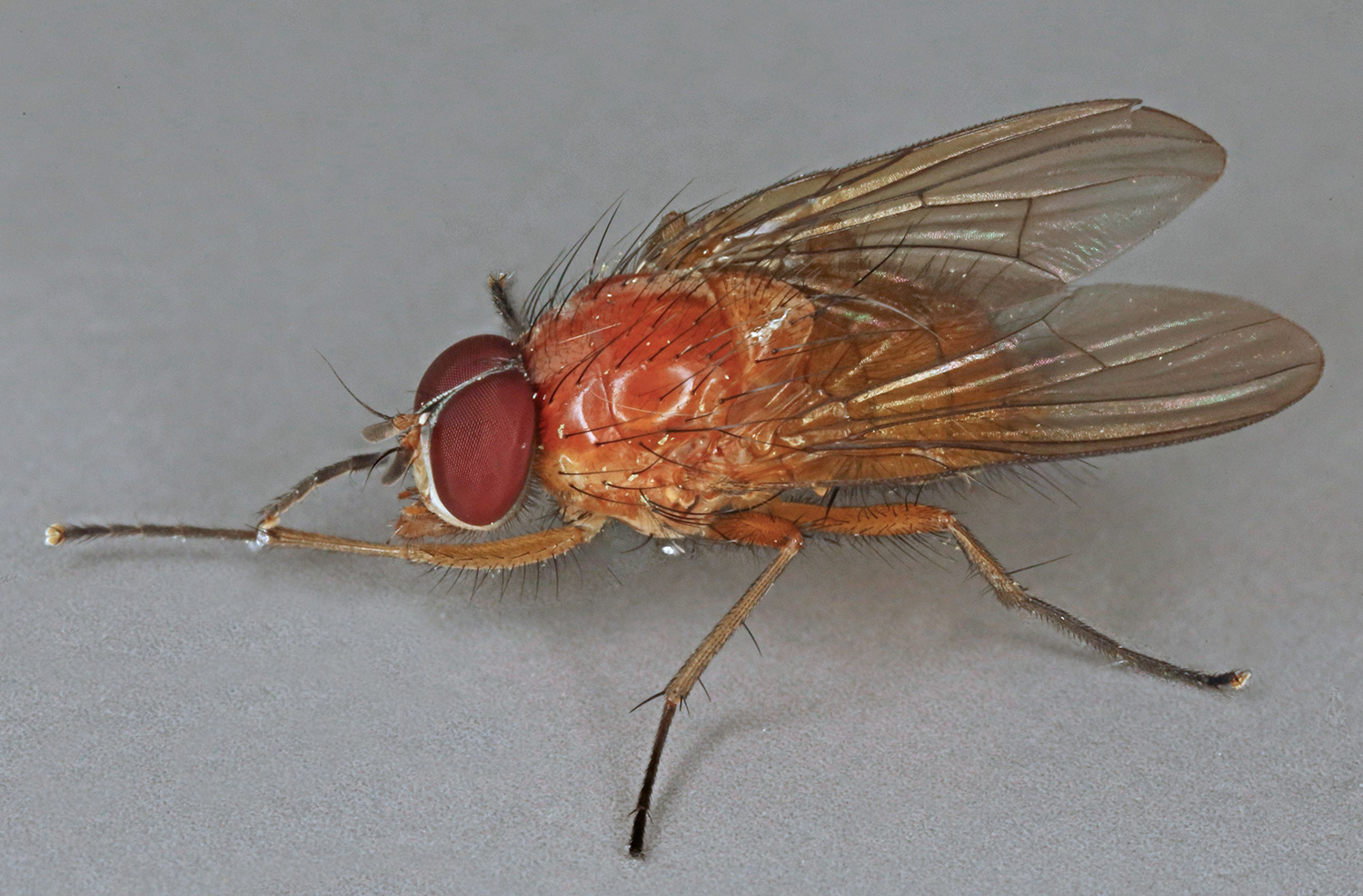
- Thricops diaphanus North Wales

Scientific classification
- Kingdom: Animalia
- Phylum: Arthropoda
- Clade: Pancrustacea
- Class: Insecta
- Order: Diptera
- Family: Muscidae
- Genus: Thricops
- Species: T. diaphanus

Binomial name
- Thricops diaphanus (Wiedemann, 1817)

= Thricops diaphanus =

Species of fly

Thricops diaphanus is a fly from the family Muscidae. It is found in the Palearctic.
