= Trixa rufiventris =

Scientific classification
- Kingdom: Animalia
- Phylum: Arthropoda
- Class: Insecta
- Order: Diptera
- Family: Tachinidae
- Subfamily: Dexiinae
- Tribe: Dexiini
- Genus: Trixa
- Species: T. rufiventris

Binomial name
- Trixa rufiventris (Mesnil, 1967)

Synonyms
- Dexiotrix rufiventris Mesnil, 1967

Species of fly

Trixa rufiventris is a species of fly in the family Tachinidae.

== Distribution ==
Poland, Romania, Ukraine, Italy, Spain, Austria, France, Germany, Switzerland, China, Russia.
