= Trixa caerulescens =

Scientific classification
- Kingdom: Animalia
- Phylum: Arthropoda
- Class: Insecta
- Order: Diptera
- Family: Tachinidae
- Subfamily: Dexiinae
- Tribe: Dexiini
- Genus: Trixa
- Species: T. caerulescens

Binomial name
- Trixa caerulescens Meigen, 1824

Synonyms
- Trixa aurea Kolomiets, 1973; Trixa ferruginea Meigen, 1824; Trixa grisea Meigen, 1824; Trixa limbata Zetterstedt, 1838; Trixa obscura Zetterstedt, 1838; Trixa schummelii Rotermund, 1836; Trixa scutellata Newman, 1833

Species of fly

Trixa caerulescens is a species of fly in the family Tachinidae.

== Distribution ==
British Isles, Czech Republic, Lithuania, Poland, Slovakia, Denmark, Norway, Sweden, Bulgaria, Italy, Austria, Belgium, France, Germany, Netherlands, Russia.
