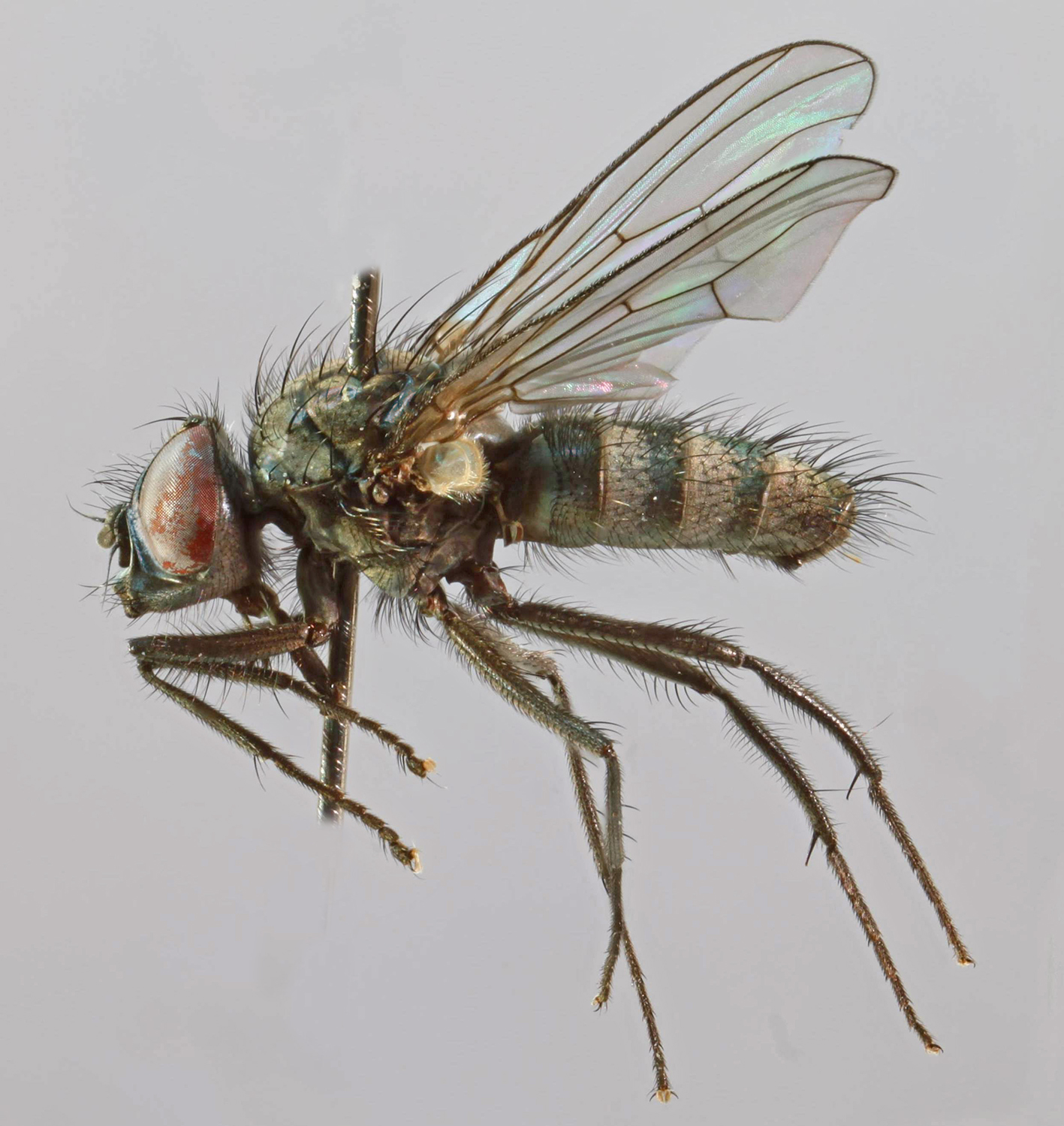
- Thricops rostratus North Wales

Scientific classification
- Kingdom: Animalia
- Phylum: Arthropoda
- Clade: Pancrustacea
- Class: Insecta
- Order: Diptera
- Family: Muscidae
- Genus: Thricops
- Species: T. rostratus

Binomial name
- Thricops rostratus (Meade, 1882)

= Thricops rostratus =

Species of fly

Thricops rostratus is a fly from the family Muscidae. It is found in the Palearctic.
