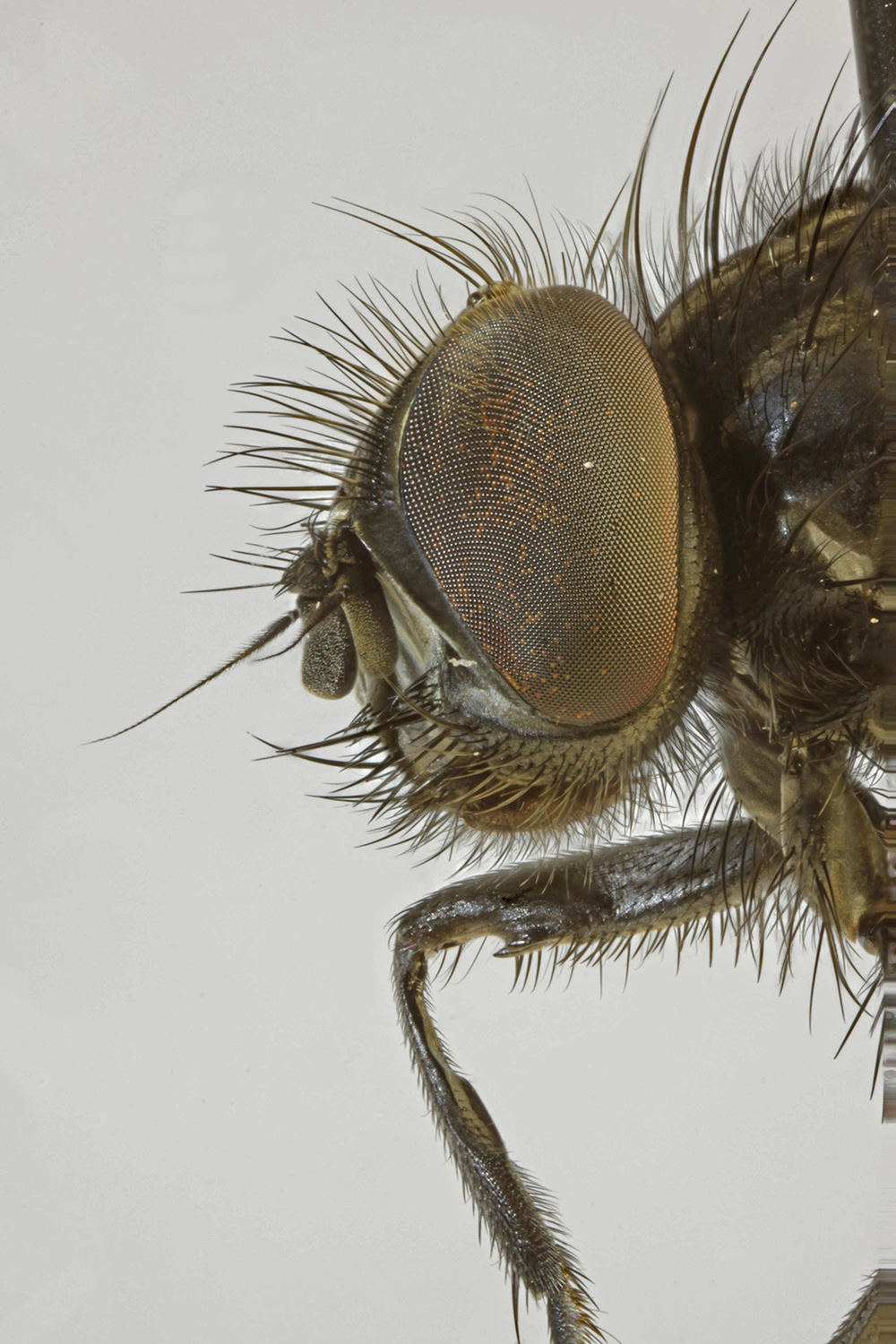
- Hydrotaea cyrtoneurina North Wales

Scientific classification
- Kingdom: Animalia
- Phylum: Arthropoda
- Clade: Pancrustacea
- Class: Insecta
- Order: Diptera
- Family: Muscidae
- Genus: Hydrotaea
- Species: H. cyrtoneurina

Binomial name
- Hydrotaea cyrtoneurina (Zetterstedt, 1845)

= Hydrotaea cyrtoneurina =

Species of fly

Hydrotaea cyrtoneurina is a fly from the family Muscidae. It is found in the Palearctic.
