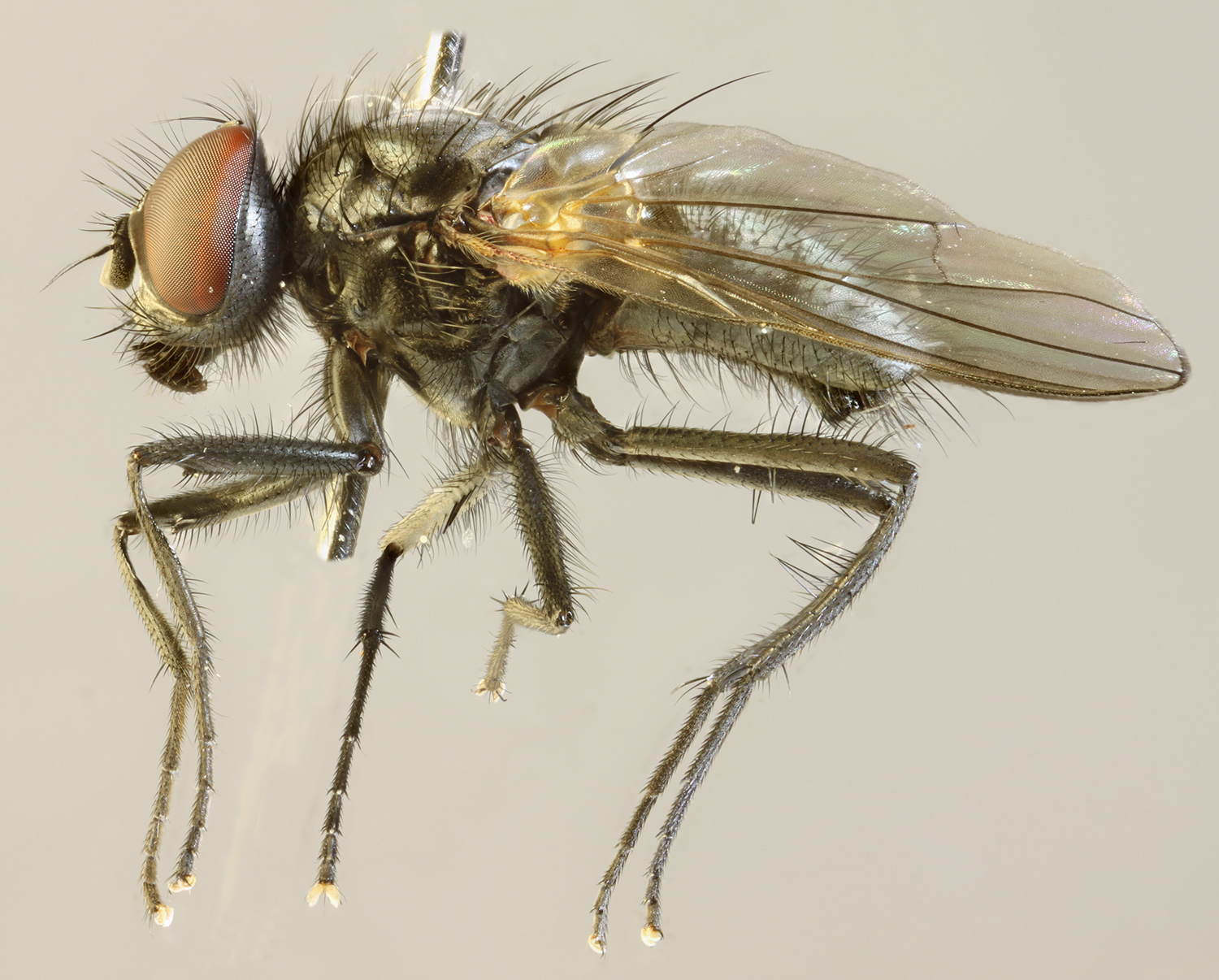
- Hydrotaea albipuncta North Wales

Scientific classification
- Kingdom: Animalia
- Phylum: Arthropoda
- Clade: Pancrustacea
- Class: Insecta
- Order: Diptera
- Family: Muscidae
- Genus: Hydrotaea
- Species: H. albipuncta

Binomial name
- Hydrotaea albipuncta (Zetterstedt, 1845)

= Hydrotaea albipuncta =

Species of fly

Hydrotaea albipuncta is a fly from the family Muscidae. It is found in the Palearctic.
