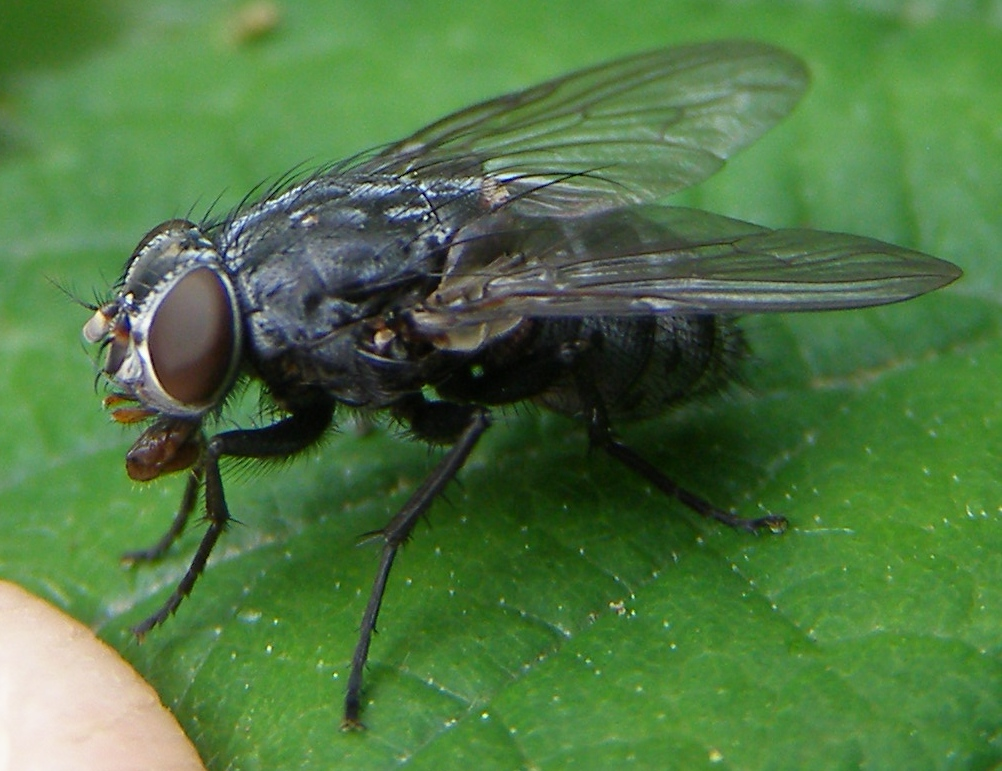
- Muscina prolapsa female

Scientific classification
- Kingdom: Animalia
- Phylum: Arthropoda
- Clade: Pancrustacea
- Class: Insecta
- Order: Diptera
- Family: Muscidae
- Genus: Muscina
- Species: M. prolapsa

Binomial name
- Muscina prolapsa (Harris, 1780)

Synonyms
- Musca pabulorum Fallén, 1817; Musca prolapsa Harris, 1780; Muscina pabulorum (Fallén, 1817); Muscina prolapsor authors

= Muscina prolapsa =

Species of fly

Muscina prolapsa is a species of fly from the family Muscidae.
