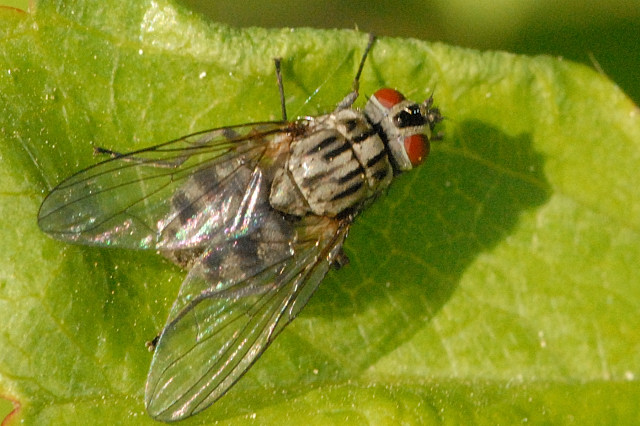
- Muscina prolapsa female

Scientific classification
- Kingdom: Animalia
- Phylum: Arthropoda
- Clade: Pancrustacea
- Class: Insecta
- Order: Diptera
- Family: Muscidae
- Subfamily: Azeliinae
- Tribe: Reinwardtiini; Brauer & von Bergenstamm, 1889

= Reinwardtiini =

Tribe of flies

Reinwardtiini is a tribe of flies from the family Muscidae.

== Genera ==
- Brachygasterina Macquart, 1851
- Chaetagenia Malloch, 1928
- Correntosia Malloch, 1934
- Dalcyella Carvalho, 1989
- Itatingamyia Albuquerque, 1979
- Muscina Robineau-Desvoidy, 1830
- Passeromyia Rodhain & Villeneuve, 1915
- Philornis Meinert, 1890
- Psilochaeta Stein, 1911
- Reinwardtia Brauer & von Bergenstamm, 1890
- Synthesiomyia Brauer & von Bergenstamm, 1893
