= Azeliinae =

- Azelia cilipes male

Scientific classification
- Kingdom: Animalia
- Phylum: Arthropoda
- Clade: Pancrustacea
- Class: Insecta
- Order: Diptera
- Family: Muscidae
- Subfamily: Azeliinae; Robineau-Desvoidy, 1830

Tribes
- Azeliini Robineau-Desvoidy, 1830; Reinwardtiini Brauer & von Bergenstamm, 1889

Subfamily of flies

Azeliinae is a subfamily within the Diptera family Muscidae. Some authors place members within the subfamily Muscinae.
