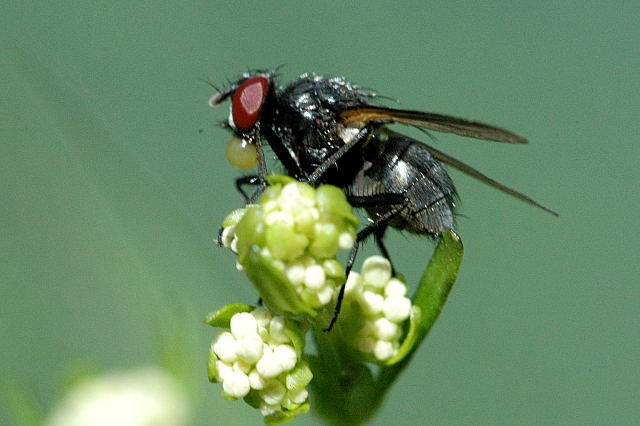
- Hydrotaea diabolus female

Scientific classification
- Kingdom: Animalia
- Phylum: Arthropoda
- Clade: Pancrustacea
- Class: Insecta
- Order: Diptera
- Family: Muscidae
- Subfamily: Azeliinae
- Tribe: Azeliini; Robineau-Desvoidy, 1830

= Azeliini =

Tribe of flies

Azeliini is a tribe of flies from the family Muscidae.

== Genera ==
- Azelia Robineau-Desvoidy, 1830
- Drymeia Meigen, 1826
- Hydrotaea Robineau-Desvoidy, 1830
- Micropotamia Carvalho, 1993
- Ophyra Robineau-Desvoidy, 1830
- Potamia Robineau-Desvoidy, 1830
- Thricops Rondani, 1856
