= Moses Harris =

English entomologist and engraver (1730–1787)

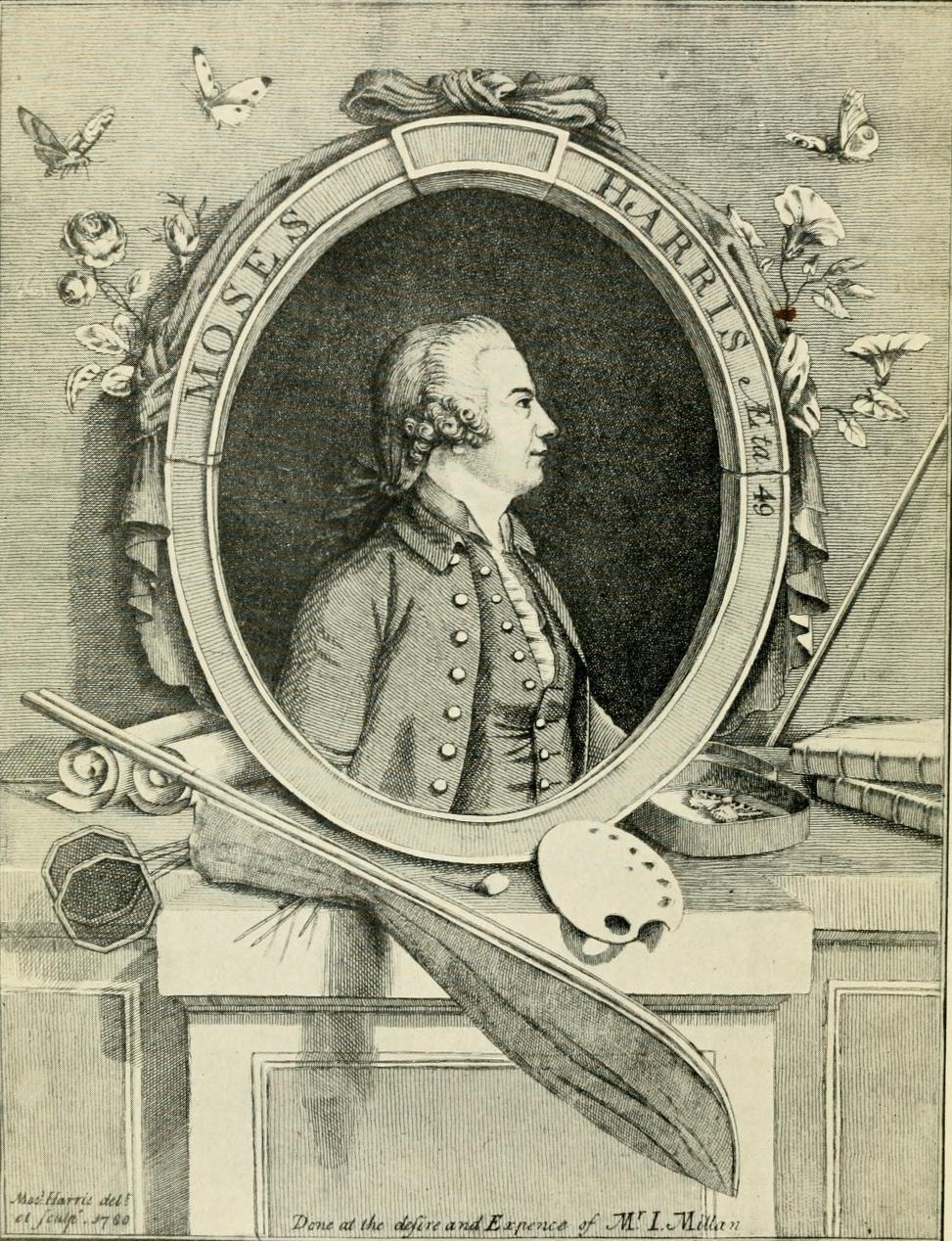
Moses Harris, 1760

Moses Harris (15 April 1730 – 1787) was an English entomologist and engraver.

== Life and work ==
Harris was encouraged in entomology from a young age by his uncle, a member of the Society of the Aurelians. In 1762 he became secretary of a second Society of Aurelians. He was a skilled artist, displaying some of his insect drawings at the Royal Academy in 1785. He drew and engraved illustrations for books including Dru Drury's Illustrations of Natural History (3 volumes, 1770–1782) and John Coakley Lettsom's The Naturalist's and Traveller's Companion (1772).

=== Colour theory ===
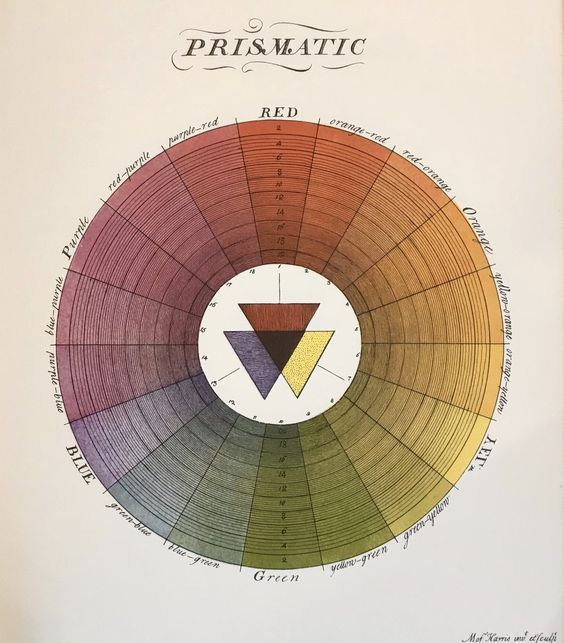
Harris's 'colour wheel' showing how a range of colours can be made from red, yellow and blue

In "The Natural System of Colours" published in 1766, Harris discussed the multitude of colours that can be created using three "grand or principle" colours: red, yellow and blue. As a naturalist and an engraver, Harris focussed on the relationships between colours and how they are coded and created. He explained how three colours can be íntermixed, tinted and shaded to create 660 colours "materially, or by the painters art". Harris referred to red, yellow and blue as "Primitives" and attempted to link these to Isaac Newton's colour theory by making reference to colours "seen in the rainbow refracted by the prism". "The Natural System of Colours" features two illustrations and the first of these is Harris' 'Prismatic' colour wheel which features red, yellow and blue as the key principle colours. These colours sit at the centre of the colour wheel surrounded by variations of 'Mediate' colours, orange, green and purple. The second illustration in "The Natural System of Colours" is Harris' 'Compound' colour wheel which features orange, green and purple at the centre surrounded by variations of tertiary colours between each of the 'Mediate' colours. Harris conflated the creation of colour using pigments with the creation and appearance of colour in respect to light-waves in two ways. Firstly, in his attempt to deal with black and white. He suggested that the admixture of opposing colours create "a dirty unmeaning colour" and he contended that the admixture of red, blue and yellow "in equal force and in the strongest powers which by violently opposing each other and in very unequal contest are all three continually defeated, causing a total confusion and obscurity in darkness", thereby suggesting that these three colours create black. In reference to this claim, the centres of each colour wheel feature three overlaid colours (red, yellow and blue, and orange, green and purple) outlined in black (as a result of the engraving process used to create the illustration) thereby causing a blackish effect but on closer inspection, the central segment of each colour wheel appears a dark, murky brown. In reference to white, Harris suggested that white represented a "total privation or absence of colour". In addition, Harris suggested that his 'Prismatic' colour wheel reflected the colours "shown in the prism" while the colours depicted in the 'Compound' colour wheel "admits of all colours in nature, not found in the prismatic part".

The Natural System of Colours was published again in 1811, this time edited by Thomas Martyn and dedicated to the second President of the Royal Academy, Benjamin West. In 1963, a reproduction of "The Natural System of Colours" was privately printed and distributed by the Whitney Library of Design, New York. The reproduction came about when Faber Birren acquired a copy of Harris' original book and arranged to have it faithfully reproduced. Birren supervised the reproduction and ensured that the engravings of the two colour wheels matched those in Harris' original book.

=== Entomology ===
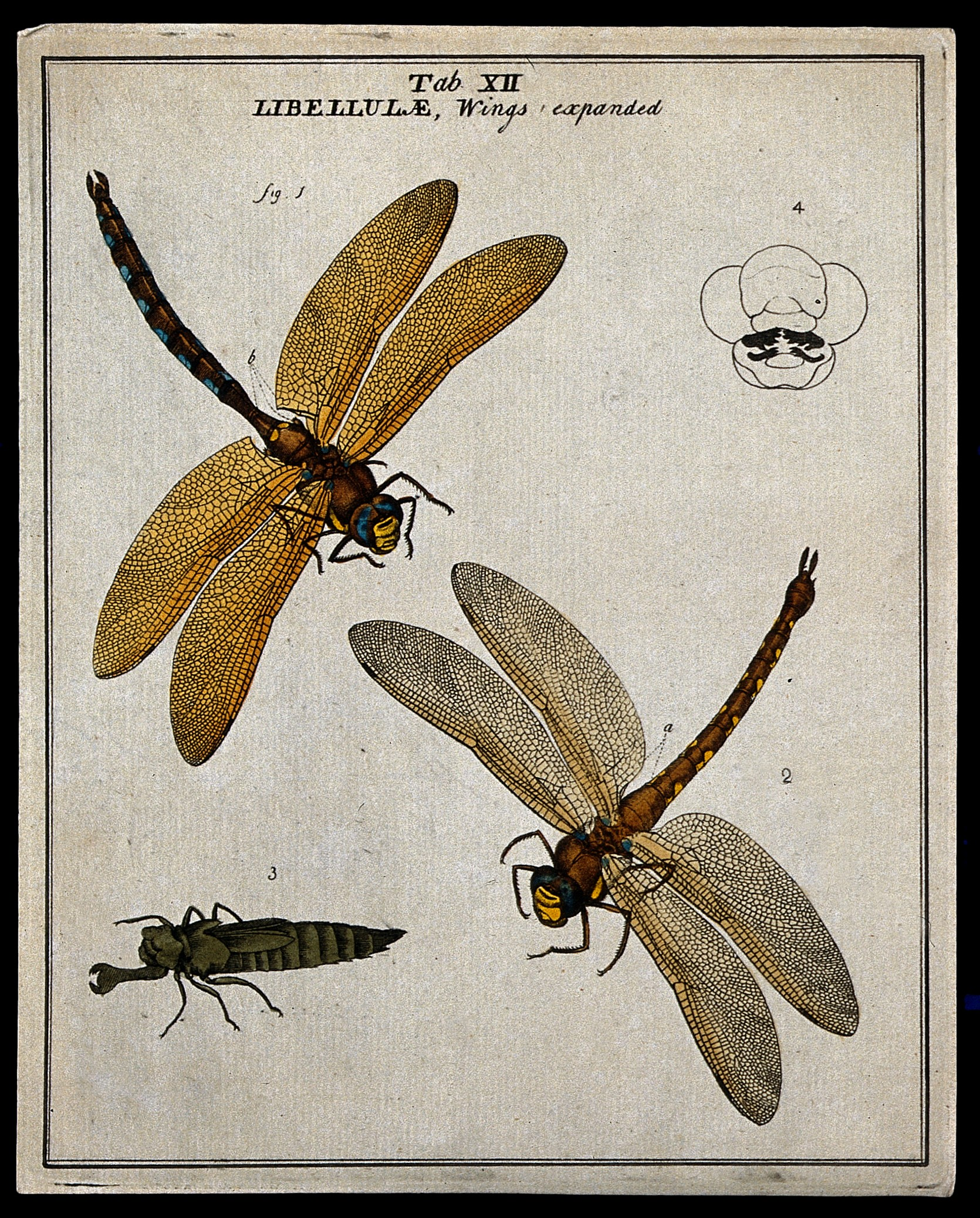
Accurately drawn dragonflies by Moses Harris, 1780. At top left, the brown hawker, Aeshna grandis; a less accurate larva is at lower left.

Harris published his The Aurelian or natural history of English insects in 1766. In 1780 he followed this up with the first scientific descriptions of several Odonata including the banded demoiselle, Calopteryx splendens, and was the first English artist to make illustrations of dragonflies accurate enough to be identified to species. Reviewing his artwork, the odonatologists Albert Orr and Matti Hämäläinen comment that his drawing of a 'large brown' (Aeshna grandis, top left of image) was "superb", while the "perfectly natural colours of the eyes indicate that Harris had examined living individuals of these aeshnids and either coloured the printed copper plates himself or supervised the colourists." However, they consider the larva on the same plate far less good, "a very stiff dorso-lateral view of an aeshnid larva with mask extended. No attempt has been made to depict the eyes, antennae or hinge on the mask or labial palps, all inconceivable omissions for an artist of Harris' talent had he actually examined a specimen", and they suggest he copied it from August Johann Rösel von Rosenhof.

In 1778, Harris discovered the Muscina levida [assimilis] species of fly. Two years later, he followed with a discovery of the Muscina prolapsa species of fly.

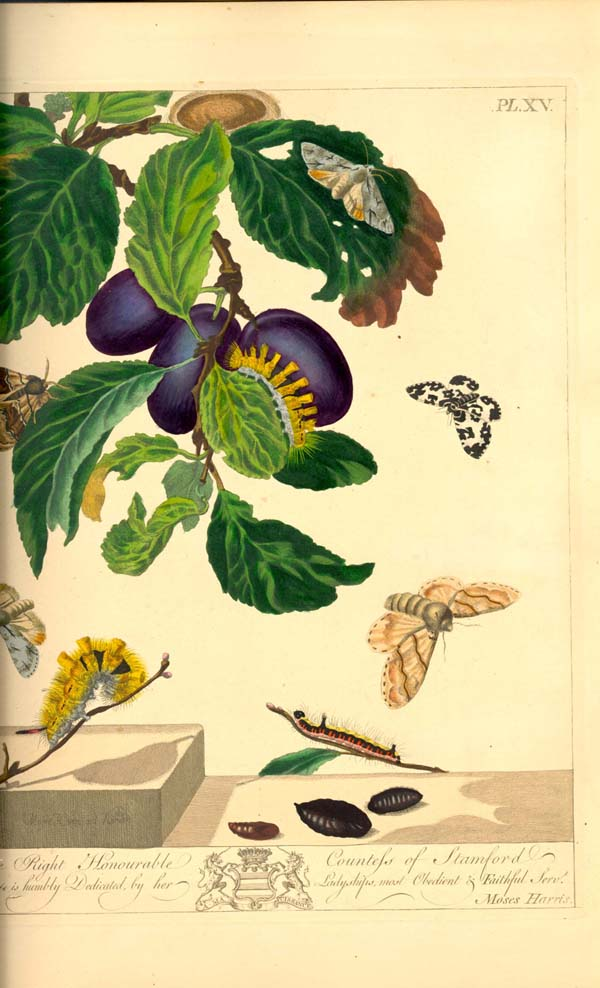
Harris plate from The Aurelian, showing various moths

=== Cartography ===
In 1744, Harris was employed as a surveyor aboard HMS Winchelsea to Halifax – the colonial capital of Nova Scotia. During his travels he produced a draft map of the settlement that included a scaled tracing of the Chebucto Harbour and the Bedford Basin. This map was subsequently updated and published in The Gentleman's Magazine in 1749 and 1750, with each subsequent update depicting a landscape that was progressively tamer than its predecessor. Three prominent and highly detailed engravings of insects that appear in the 1750 version of the map "A Plan of the Harbour of Chebucto and Town of Halifax" are erroneously labelled as European species punitively symbolizing an instance of cartographic imperialism.

== Works ==
=== Written by Harris ===
- Natural System of Colours (1766)
- The Aurelian or natural history of English insects (1766, 2nd edn 1775)
- The English Lepidoptera, or, the Aurelian's Pocket Companion (1775)
- An Exposition of English Insects Including the Several Classes of Neuroptera, Hymenoptera, & Diptera, or Bees, Flies, & Libellulae (1776[-80])

=== Illustrated by Harris ===
- Most of the original drawings and copper plate engravings for Dru Drury's Illustrations of Natural History
- 44 watercolour drawings on life-cycle of British Lepidoptera for a projected edition of the Aurelian (Natural History Museum)
- Compound and Prismatic Colour Wheels (Royal Academy)

== Family ==
Harris was survived by his wife, and a son, John Harris (1767–1832), a watercolour painter.

== See also ==
- Dragonfly
