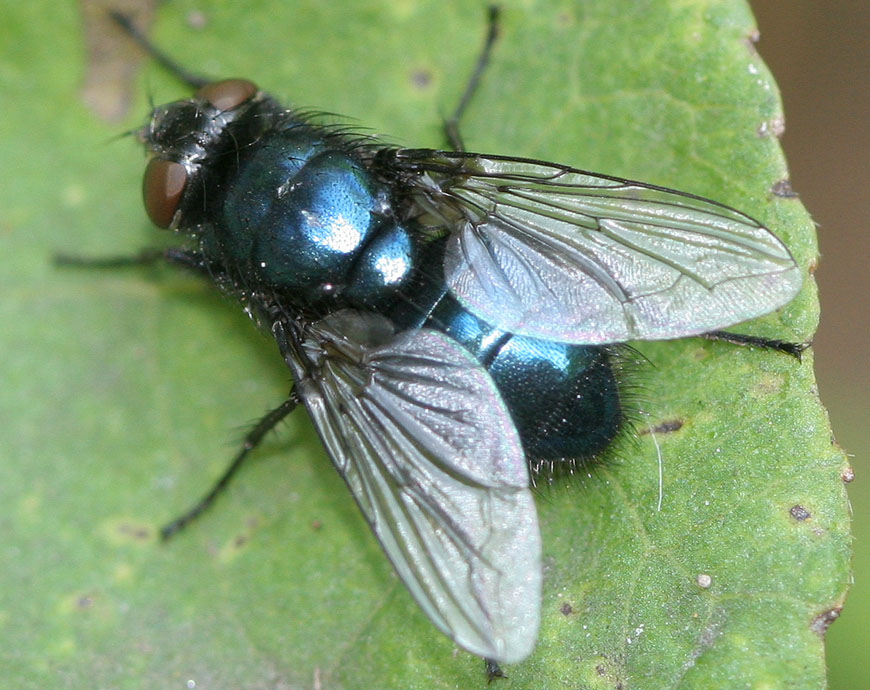

Scientific classification
- Kingdom: Animalia
- Phylum: Arthropoda
- Clade: Pancrustacea
- Class: Insecta
- Order: Diptera
- Family: Calliphoridae
- Genus: Protophormia
- Species: P. terraenovae

Binomial name
- Protophormia terraenovae Robineau-Desvoidy, 1830

Synonyms
- Lucilia terraenovae Macquart; Musca groenlandica Zetterstedt; Phormia terraenovae Robineau-Desvoidy; Musca orior Harris; Protophormia orior Harris

= Protophormia terraenovae =

Species of fly

Protophormia terraenovae is commonly called northern blowfly, blue-bottle fly or blue-assed fly (blue-arsed fly in British English). It is distinguished by its deep blue coloration and large size and is an important species throughout the Northern Hemisphere. This fly is notable for its economic effect as a myiasis pest of livestock and its antibiotic benefits in maggot therapy. Also of interest is P. terraenovae's importance in forensic investigations: because of their temperature-dependent development and their prominent presence on corpses, the larvae of this species are useful in minimum post-mortem interval (mPMI) determination.

== Taxonomy ==
Protophormia terraenovae, of the family Calliphoridae, was named and first described by French entomologist André Jean Baptiste Robineau-Desvoidy in his 1830 "Essai sur les myodaires". Its genus is shared by one other fly, Protophormia atriceps. Both flies are a dark, undusted, metallic blue-green-black. P. terraenovae is differentiated from P. atriceps by its flat face, plumose arista, and by up to 2 additional pairs of setae along the margin of the scutellum. P. terraenovae's specific epithet is translated from the Latin as "of the New World".

The oldest-known specimens of P. terraenovae pupae were identified in 1973 within the fossilized skull of a steppe wisent. The bison skull, estimated to date from the late Eemian period, was excavated from the site of a new sluice for the Brussels-Rupel Canal in Zemst, Belgium. The specimens, although approximately 75,000 years old, are identical in form to the pupae of the modern species.

== Morphology ==
=== Adult ===
The adult Protophormia terraenovae, one of the larger species of calliphorids, measures between 7 and 12 mm in length. It is characterized by a black to brown anterior thoracic spiracle, a black basicosta, brown wing veins, and dark calypters. Upper calypters sprout black setae. While the thorax and abdomen of P. terraenovae can range in color from dark purple to dark green, the head and legs of this fly are black. Postocular setae are short but prominent; the palpi are yellow or dusky brown.

Sexes of the species are easily distinguished by the width of the space between the eyes, the frons: that of the female is .386 times the width of the head, while the frons of the male is only .140 times the head width. Chaetotaxy, the study of setae arrangement, is also useful for determination of sex—for example, the male lacks the fronto-orbital, lateroclinate setae found in the female. These setae are located just at the edge of the frons, near the upper portion of the complex eyes.

=== Larvae ===
Protophormia terraenovae larvae are tiny and white, with 12 segments. Length varies by larval age, with the first instar growing up to 2.63 mm and the third, by contrast, as long as 11.87 mm. In the third instar, the last segment is adorned with pointed tubercles, and segment 10 exhibits dorsal spines along its posterior margin. The latter characteristic distinguishes P. terraenovae, 3rd instar, from a similar calliphorid, Phormia regina.

== Development ==
Being of the order Diptera, Protophormia terraenovae is holometabolous in its development, meaning it experiences dramatic changes from immature to adult. Protophormia terraenovae undergoes three instars, a pupal stage, and finally an adult stage.

First instar larvae obtain a liquid diet from orifices or wounds of a body. The instars that follow digest the body itself. Among the first to colonize, Calliphoridae species are found on the body almost immediately. As eggs hatch into the first larval stage, P. terraenovae begins feeding and increases in size, limited by its chitinous outer cuticle. As P. terraenovae larvae molt into the second instar, feeding intensifies: with larger and more developed mouthparts, second instars are able to break down tougher body tissues.

The third instar is unique, consisting of several substages. First, the larvae feed until they reach their maximum size. Next, larvae clear their crops. In this prepupal stage, also called the wandering stage, the maggots seek a dry, safe area for pupation. During the pupal stage, the outer cuticle hardens and tans into a dark brown color, gradually darkening with age. Finally, metamorphosis into the adult is completed with the shedding of the pupal casing and the emergence of the fly.

The time of development between instars to pupae to adult differs depending on temperatures. The mean duration of development, at constant pressure and 25 °C, between oviposition and hatching is 1.83 days. From first to second instar, approximately 2.92 days pass. About 6.17 days pass between the second and third instar, and 8.0 days between the third instar and the post-feeding stage. The wandering maggot takes around 9.67 days to reach the pupal stage. Lastly, emergence of this blowfly occurs about 15.83 days after pupation. In fluctuating conditions such as those around crime scenes, there is a tendency for development to slow down. Under-approximation of age is therefore a common mistake.

The development of P. terraenovae is inversely related to temperature. Studies at (15, 20, 25, 30, 35)°C were performed, and the minimal duration of development from oviposition to adult ranges from 9.19 ± .3 days at 35 °C, to 37.78 ± 2.96 days at 15 °C. The minimum development threshold for total immature development is 8.95 °C. The overall thermal constant (K) for P. terraenovae is 240.2 ± 9.3 day-degrees above threshold. The inverse relationship and regression of development from oviposition to pupation resulted in a 9.8 °C threshold for the species.

Pupation occurs on or within .5 meters of the decaying body. The duration of the pupal stage is relatively long compared to the rest of development, inactively occupying 43% of P. terraenovae's total cycle. The third instar larva spends 13% of its cycle in feeding stage and 22% in post-feeding stages.

== Geographic distribution ==
Protophormia terraenovae has a Holarctic distribution, meaning the species is found throughout the northern hemisphere. The fly is common in cool regions and, being "the most cold tolerant of all calliphorid species," can withstand extreme temperatures. P. terraenovae can be found as close as 550 miles from the North Pole and is abundantly found in the Arctic.

In North America, P. terraenovae can be found from Mexico to Canada. Appearance of this species is rare and mostly confined to the winter months in warm regions such as Texas and Florida. P. terraenovae is a spring or summer species in high latitudes and elevations.

== Importance ==
=== Medical ===
Maggot debridement therapy (MDT) is commonly used for the cleansing and disinfecting of chronic wounds containing necrotic flesh. Various studies have shown that MDT is effective in treating wounds that have failed to heal. Effective MDT species consume necrotic tissue while cleansing the wound. Protophormia terraenovae is among the few blowfly species that fit these criteria. The larvae of most blowflies are necrophagous, meaning they develop in the bodies of dead vertebrates where they consume necrotic tissues. Because the majority of other blowfly larvae consume both necrotic and healthy tissues, P. terraenovae is an important species. P. terraenovae is also known to produce antibiotics during feeding: the secretions of P. terraenovae larvae are effective in fighting infections involving Streptococcus pyogenes and Streptococcus pneumoniae.

The main concern with the use of MDT is sepsis. P. terraenovae is blamed for five reported bloodstream infections. To prevent infection, P. terraenovae maggots must be raised in vitro under sterile conditions. Provided these precautions are taken, the use of P. terraenovae on chronic wounds appears to remain safe and efficient in wound treatment.

=== Economic ===
As a species of the blowfly family Calliphoridae, Protophormia terraenovae causes economically important myiasis in livestock and, occasionally, in humans. It also affects other populations of Diptera due to the predacious nature of its larvae when competing for necrotic tissue. P. terraenovae larvae have also been known to behave cannibalistically.

Myiasis due to Protophormia terraenovae has been reported in both wild and domestic animals, but it most commonly affects livestock. Species usually oviposit on carrion, but are capable of oviposition in the wounds of livestock and wild animals. Thus, P. terraenovae acts as a secondary invader in causing myiasis. Commonly referred to as 'wound strike', lesions are foul smelling ulcers that are filled with larvae. Animals infected with myiasis may die from toxemia and sepsis.

In particular, Protophormia terraenovae causes facultative, cutaneous myiasis of cattle, sheep and reindeer in the northern Holarctic region. Larvae feeding on the skin of sheep causes distress to the animal and loss of wool. This skin damage occurs to a lesser extent in horses, goats and pigs. Adults of this species are capable of causing myiasis but are found only in the Palaearctic and Nearctic regions.

Also of economic significance are manifestations of the species in slaughter-houses and poultry houses. Populations of P. terraenovae are maintained by refuse and the carcasses of dead animals. Due to their predacious nature, large numbers of this species can populate in the presence of other Dipteran species. Blowfly bred at these locations cause considerable local nuisance and may spread disease to both humans and animals by contaminating meat and foodstuffs.

=== Forensic ===
Medicocriminal entomology is the branch of forensic entomology dealing with the use of arthropod evidence in criminal investigations. Because they make up the first wave of fauna to colonize a corpse, blowflies are among the most accurate forensic indicators of time elapsed since death, technically referred to as the post-mortem interval (PMI). This estimation is made by determining the developmental stages of the insects present on a body. Protophormia terraenovae is forensically important because of its extremely specific developmental time. Two methods are used to determine the PMI of a P. terraenovae-infested body. One approach utilizes information about the developmental stages of larvae located on or within the body, and the second utilizes facts about the larval stage as it emerges from the body to pupate.

The first, second, and third instar larvae present on a body are considered to be feeding stages. The first and second molting are characterized by rapid increases in size and generally occur within a certain range of larval length. Because the development of these flies is dependent on temperature, entomologists can use past weather data to estimate the ages of larvae and even pupae discovered on a corpse.

When post-feeding larvae venture away from the body to pupate, as is common for most blowflies, displacement behavior becomes the determining factor of age. When a body is discovered, if the larvae are leaving, it is possible to measure the distance they have traveled and, with knowledge of the species' crawling speed, to calculate when they left the body. Crawling speed is affected by terrain, temperature, and maggot length. These considerations allow forensic entomologists to make precise age estimations.

Another noteworthy forensic consideration is the use of blowfly species, in this case Protophormia terraenovae, in entomotoxicology. Evidence of drug use can be found in blowflies feeding upon cadavers with post-mortem drugs in their systems. Studies have shown that unlike other species of necrophagous Diptera, blowfly species can indicate the presence of morphine in the cuticle during larval growth, and, definitively, in pupa casings. Because puparial cases decay at an extremely slow rate and can be recovered years after the death of an individual, they can become very important to the examination of a corpse.

==== The "Pig Farm Case" ====
In 2007, entomological evidence was used in the infamous "Pig Farm Case". An eighteen-month-long search of several acres of farmland and property in British Columbia resulted in the discovery of trace DNA evidence linked to twenty-six missing women. The heads, hands, and feet of two of the missing women were eventually found. Protophormia terraenovae larvae were prominent on these remains. Forensic entomologists determined developmental rates based on locally collected specimens of P. terraenovae, and with this information, concluded that both women had been exposed for weeks prior to being frozen. The pig farmer and co-owner of the grounds, Robert "Willie" Pickton, was charged with the murders of all twenty-six women. In December 2007 Pickton was convicted of second-degree murder in the deaths of six women and stands accused of first-degree murder in the deaths of twenty other women.

== Current and future research ==
Investigation of the species is still ongoing: specifically, researchers are examining PMI and ADH/ADD for P. terraenovae, ecdysteroid levels and molting, and adult diapause with reactions to certain temperatures.

Microlesions were made inside the brain of Protophormia terraenovae to study the diapause factor. Results show that secretory neurons are necessary for entering the reproductive diapause. Other research based on the haemolymph circulation rate suggests that sensory-induced changes can result in a series of gustatory stimulations that shorten the cardiac cycle of P. terraenovae.
