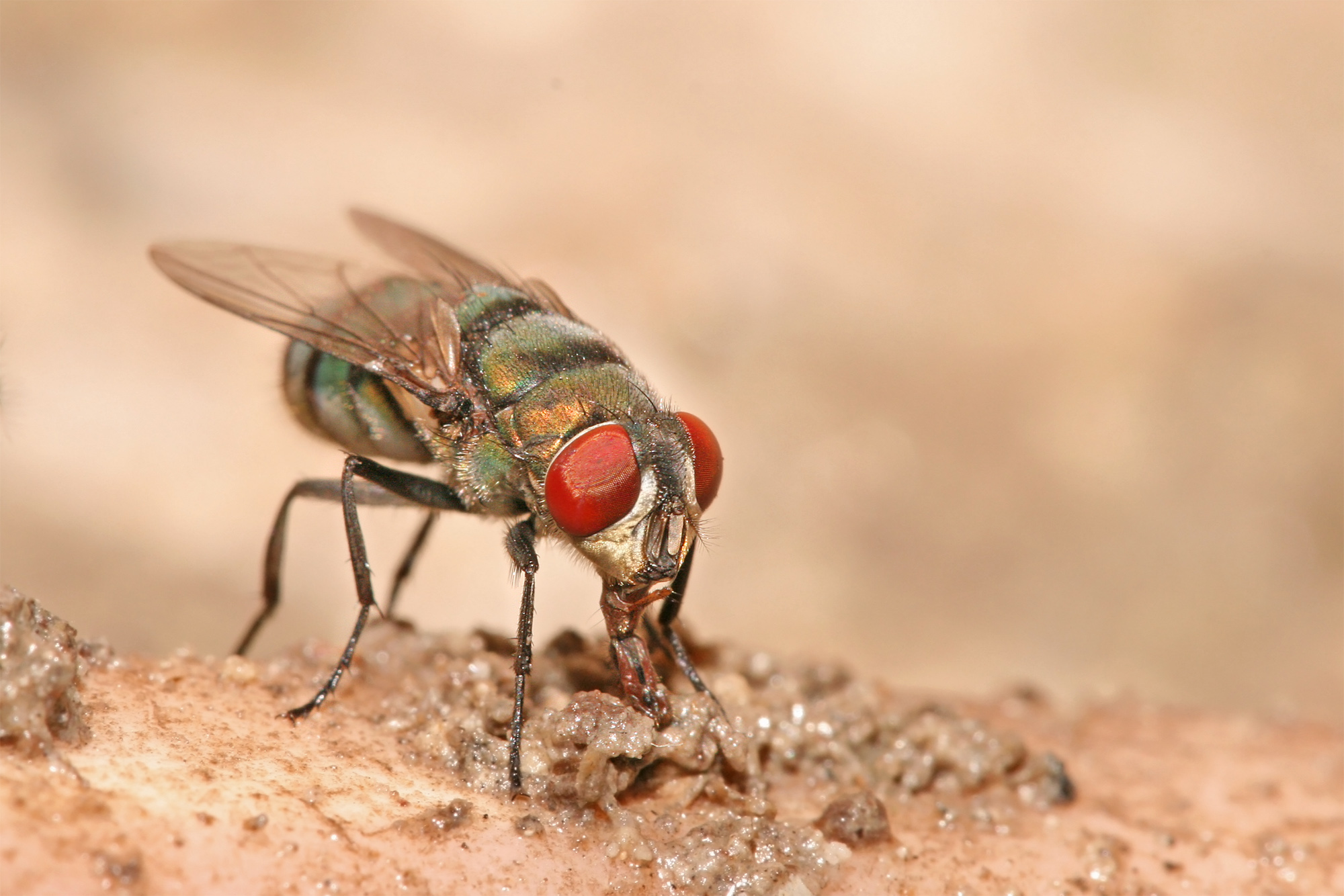
- Chrysomya albiceps

Scientific classification
- Kingdom: Animalia
- Phylum: Arthropoda
- Clade: Pancrustacea
- Class: Insecta
- Order: Diptera
- Family: Calliphoridae
- Subfamily: Chrysomyinae

Genera
- see text

= Chrysomyinae =

Subfamily of flies

The Chrysomyinae are a subfamily of Calliphoridae, or blow flies. According to Whitworth, the distinguishing characteristic of this subfamily is a setose stem vein.

== Genera ==
- Chloroprocta Wulp, 1896
- Cochliomyia Townsend, 1915
- Chrysomya Robineau-Desvoidy, 1830
- Chrysopyrellia
- Compsomyiops Townsend, 1918
- Hemilucilia
- Paralucilia Brauer & von Berganstamm, 1891
- Phormia Robineau-Desvoidy, 1830
- Phormiata
- Protocalliphora Hough, 1899
- Protophormia Townsend, 1908
- Trypocalliphora Peus, 1960
