= Compsomyiops callipes =

Scientific classification
- Kingdom: Animalia
- Phylum: Arthropoda
- Clade: Pancrustacea
- Class: Insecta
- Order: Diptera
- Family: Calliphoridae
- Genus: Compsomyiops
- Species: C. callipes

Binomial name
- Compsomyiops callipes (Bigot, 1877)

Synonyms
- Paraluclia wheeleri (Hough, 1899)

Species of fly

Compsomyiops callipes, previously known as Paraluclia wheeleri, is a member of the blowfly family Calliphoridae. It is a warm weather fly that can be found in southwestern parts of the United States and parts of South America. This species can be identified by its chaetotaxy, metallic blue color, club-shaped palp, and brown calypters.

Compsomyiops callipes serves an important role in the field of medicocriminal entomology, a subfield of forensic entomology, by determining post mortem intervals (PMI). This species is attracted to carrion and has been involved in case studies in California where it has been the primary fly found on human remains.

== Taxonomy ==
Compsomyiops callipes was first described in 1877. It was later described as Paralucilia wheeleri but it was not recognized that this was only a new name for a species that had already been named. In 1985, J. P. Dear revised the New World tribe Chrysomyini, which resulted in Paralucilia wheeleri being synonymized under Compsomyiops callipes Bigot. It is a member of the family Calliphoridae, commonly called blowflies, and the subfamily Chrysomyinae.

== Description ==
Compsomyiops callipes is a member of the order Diptera meaning two wings. Diptera are characterized by having two forewings and halteres. Since it is a member of the family Calliphoridae, it has bristles on the meron, its antennae have plumose arista, and it has two to three notopleural bristles. The subfamily Chrysomyinae is characterized by a setose stem vein on the wings. Compsomyiops callipes is a relatively large fly with a length of about 6–12 mm. Its abdomen and thorax are a metallic blue color. It has a bright yellow gena and four longitudinal lines on its pronotum. The setae on the posterior margin of the hind coxa are long and dark. Its palp, which is an appendage near its mouth used for sensation, movement and feeding, is clavate meaning club-shaped. Its anterior spiracle and calypters are brown. Compsomyiops callipes is very similar in appearance to flies belonging to the genus Cochliomyia but can be distinguished by its palp, calypters, and chaetotaxy, which is the study of the arrangement of setae.

Plumose arista.

Longitudinal lines on the pronotum.

Bright yellow gena.

== Locale ==
Compsomyiops callipes is generally found where there are warm temperatures. It is prevalent in the southwestern United States, in states such as Texas, Arizona, New Mexico, and California. However this species has been reported all throughout the world in warmer climates. This species can also be found in Mexico, Australia, and Venezuela in montane savanna and cloud forest habitats. Compsomyiops callipes is more abundant in rural and riparian areas as opposed to urban settings.

== Feeding ==
Compsomyiops callipes is attracted to carrion. In accordance with other blow-flies, it can smell carrion from up to 10 miles away. Flowers like the American pawpaw and Dead Horse Arum produce these smells of death to attract the flies thereby spreading their pollen. Nectar from these flowers can be used to generate energy for flight. Compsomyiops callipes were found on rat carrion in a Venezuelan study. Larvae from Compsomyiops callipes are commonly found on dead bodies providing time of death estimations.

== Life cycle ==
=== Egg to larvae ===
The life cycle of Compsomyiops callipes consists of the larval, pupa, and adult stages. The first stage, or larval stage, starts when the larvae hatch from the egg. This stage is broken up even further into instars. The first instar is about 2.5-3.9 mm in length. The larvae have a segmented body. On segments two to nine, they have light brown complete spinose bands. There are three small tubercles above and three below the posterior cavity. The posterior spiracles have two slits; however, they are not surrounded by the peritreme. The spiracular openings of the respiratory system are restricted to a pair each (Amphipneustic). The second instar is 4–9.5 mm in length. At this stage, the larvae have developed spines with 1-3 points the form a V-shape on the anal protuberance. The spiracles are now surrounded by an incomplete peritreme. The third instar is 8.5–17 mm in length. The posterior spiracles are now large and have a broad peritreme. They have also developed many more tubercles. Third instar larvae also possess an accessory oral sclerite. None of this development will happen or continue if the temperature is not at a constant low.

=== Pupa to adult ===
Once the larval stage of development is complete, the pupa stage begins. The prepupa stage can last 3–7 days as the larvae prepare to pupate, and has a mean air temperature of 69.9 °F (21.1 °C). Then, when the larvae actually pupate, it enters the stage known as puparium. This is the final stage before adulthood, which lasts from 8–14 days, and in this time the pupa is stationary and does nothing except develop into an adult fly. The mean air temperature in this stage is 72.2 °F (22.3 °C). Finally, the last stage is the adult fly. After it is fully developed, it emerges from the pupa and sets out to feed and then procreate; starting the life cycle over again.

== Importance ==
Compsomyiops Callipes has recently been studied in the sub-field of forensic entomology, medicocriminal entomology. Medicocriminal entomology is the use of arthropods in courts of law dealing with violent crime. Arthropods are commonly used to determine the post mortem interval (PMI), and the location of the crime, depending on which species are found. The post mortem interval is important because it greatly helps investigators solve crime cases. Arthropods are useful when determining this, because their life cycles allow the entomologist to determine their age and how long they have been present based on their succession pattern. Compsomyiops callipes has commonly been associated with carrion for over fifty years. Just recently (in the past couple years) it has been associated with human remains in California. In 2004, two separate case studies were done examining two different corpses that were found off of the road in rural dry grass areas. The arthropods found on the two corpses were examined to calculate the PMI. In this process, it was found that Compsomyips callipes was the primary adult fly and larvae found on the corpses. And further cases showed that it was the most common fly found on at least three other bodies in the Santa Clara County of California. This discovery is significant because it shows the importance of regional classification of forensically important insects.

== Current research ==
Compsomyiops callipes is currently being used in DNA based identification techniques; the most reliable being phylogenetic analysis. There has been some difficulty identifying species anatomically because many are closely related. This makes a big difference when estimating PMI because, even though the species may be anatomically similar, it may grow at a very different rate. A flawed analysis may mean a difference of weeks in the PMI, and this can significantly hurt a case study. Compsomyiops callipes is one of the few species that has had its mitochondrial DNA sequence determined. This information is currently being put in a reference sequence database that would make it easily accessible for forensic entomologists around the world.
