= Booponus =

Scientific classification
- Kingdom: Animalia
- Phylum: Arthropoda
- Clade: Pancrustacea
- Class: Insecta
- Order: Diptera
- Family: Calliphoridae
- Subfamily: Auchmeromyiinae
- Genus: Booponus; Aldrich, 1923

Type species
- Booponus intonsus Aldrich, 1923

Synonyms
- Elephantoloemus Austen, 1930; Pavlovskiomyia Grunin, 1947

Genus of flies

Booponus is a genus of blow flies in the family Calliphoridae. Most species are endoparasites of large mammals.

== Species ==
- Booponus aldrichi Senior-White, 1940
- Booponus borealis Rohdendorf, 1959
- Booponus indicus (Austen, 1930)
- Booponus inexspectatus (Grunin, 1947)
- Booponus intonsus Aldrich, 1923
- Booponus malayana Kurahashi, Benjaphong & Omar, 1997
