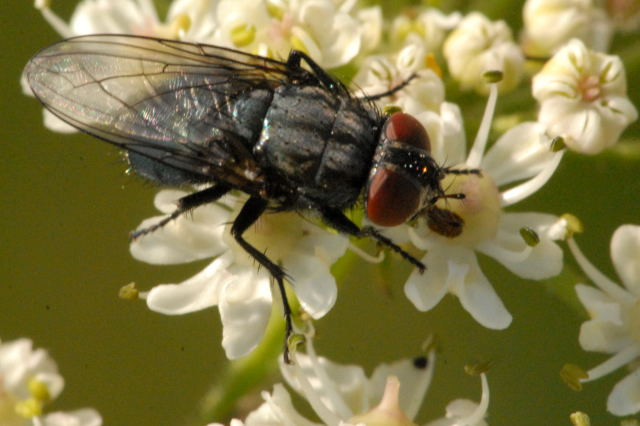
- Protocalliphora azurea

Scientific classification
- Domain: Eukaryota
- Kingdom: Animalia
- Phylum: Arthropoda
- Class: Insecta
- Order: Diptera
- Family: Calliphoridae
- Subfamily: Chrysomyinae
- Genus: Protocalliphora; Hough, 1899

Type species
- Musca azurea Fallén, 1817

= Protocalliphora =

Genus of flies

Protocalliphora or bird blowflies are a blow fly genus containing many species which are obligate parasites of birds. Eggs are laid in bird nests. After hatching, the larvae suck the blood of nestlings. They sometimes feed inside the nostrils of nestling birds and destroy the tissue at the base leading to reduced growth of the upper mandible and the young growing with "shovel-beaks". The species overwinter as adults.

The genus is affected by Wolbachia bacteria and it has been suggested that horizontal gene transfer may have led to the difficulty in separating species of Protocalliphora through DNA barcoding, with several species possessing identical mtDNA Cytochrome oxidase I sequences.
