= Eggisops =

Eggisops pecchiolii

Scientific classification
- Kingdom: Animalia
- Phylum: Arthropoda
- Clade: Pancrustacea
- Class: Insecta
- Order: Diptera
- Family: Calliphoridae
- Subfamily: Melanomyinae
- Genus: Eggisops; Rondani, 1862
- Species: E. pecchiolii

Binomial name
- Eggisops pecchiolii Rondani, 1862

Synonyms
- Eggirops Lioy, 1864; Engyops Brauer & von Berganstamm, 1889; Engyzops Bezzi & Stein, 1907; Engyzops Scudder, 1882; Eugyops Bezzi & Stein, 1907

Genus of flies

Eggisops is a genus of flies in the family Calliphoridae. It is monotypic, being represented by the single species Eggisops pecchiolii.
