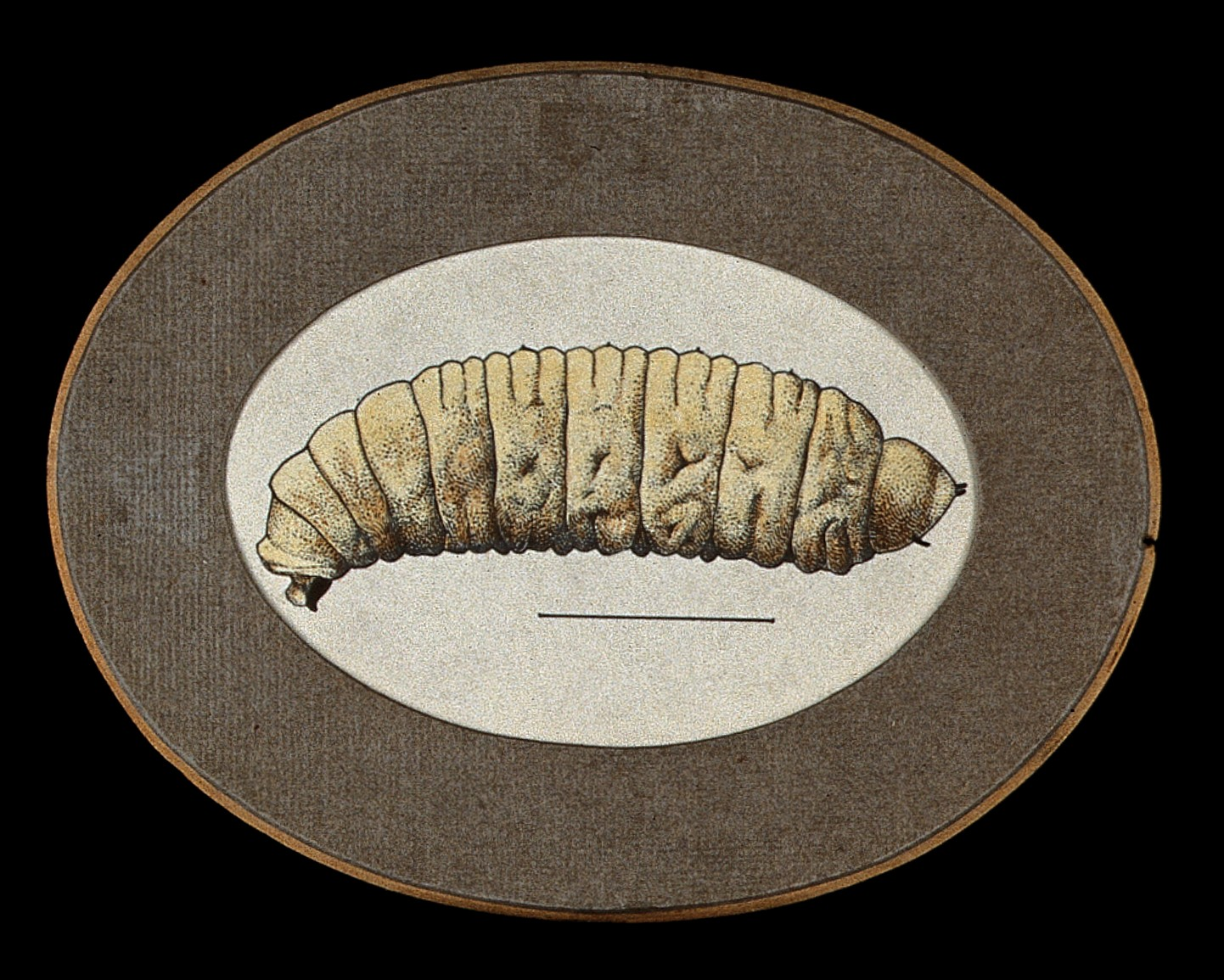
- Coloured drawing by A.J.E. Terzi, c. 1919

Scientific classification
- Kingdom: Animalia
- Phylum: Arthropoda
- Clade: Pancrustacea
- Class: Insecta
- Order: Diptera
- Family: Calliphoridae
- Genus: Auchmeromyia
- Species: A. senegalensis

Binomial name
- Auchmeromyia senegalensis (Macquart, 1851)

Synonyms
- Auchmeromyia tilhoi Surcouf & Guyon, 1912; Cosmina latecincta Bigot, 1874; Musca luteola Fabricius, 1805; Ochromyia senegalensis Macquart, 1851; Somomya subtranslucida Bertoloni, 1861

= Congo floor maggot =

Species of blow-fly

The Congo floor maggot (Auchmeromyia senegalensis) is a species of blow-fly that is native to sub Saharan Africa and the Cape Verde Islands.

Auchmeromyia sengalensis is an atypical myiasis species which does not live on or in the host, but sucks the blood of burrow-dwelling wild pigs, warthogs, aardvark, hyena and occasionally sleeping humans (sanguinivorous myiasis). Auchmeromyia is the only known genus of blood sucking maggot to feed on mammals although others feed on birds. There are five described species in the genus.

Female flies lay their eggs on dry earth or the earthen floors of huts. Larvae feed for about twenty minutes, sometimes daily, and then fall to the ground. There are three larval instars and pupation lasts two weeks. The entire life cycle takes ten weeks and is continuous throughout the year. Fully grown maggots are 18 mm long. Male flies have an exceptionally long second segment and widely separated eyes.

Whilst causing irritation and swelling, Congo floor maggots are not known to transmit disease. Bites are easily avoided by providing beds.
