= Abago =

Scientific classification
- Kingdom: Animalia
- Phylum: Arthropoda
- Clade: Pancrustacea
- Class: Insecta
- Order: Diptera
- Family: Calliphoridae
- Genus: Abago; Grunin, 1966

Type species
- Abago rohdendorfi Grunin, 1966

Genus of flies

Abago is a genus of flies from the family Calliphoridae. It is now considered a synonym of Calliphora.

== Species ==
- Abago rohdendorfi Grunin, 1966 (Synonym of Calliphora rohdendorfi (Grunin, 1966))
