= Melanomyinae =

Scientific classification
- Domain: Eukaryota
- Kingdom: Animalia
- Phylum: Arthropoda
- Class: Insecta
- Order: Diptera
- Family: Calliphoridae
- Subfamily: Melanomyinae

Genera
- see text

Subfamily of flies

The Melanomyinae are a subfamily of Calliphoridae, or blow flies. According to Whitworth, the most distinguishing characteristic of this subfamily is its dull color; however, the biology is poorly known.

== Selected genera ==
- Adichosina Villeneuve, 1934
- Angioneura
- Eggisops
- Gymnadichosia
- Melanomya (= Opsodexia)
- Melinda
- Ochromelinda
- Onesihoplisa
- Paradichosia
- Tricycleopsis
- Zernyiella
