= Entomotoxicology =

In forensic entomology, entomotoxicology is the analysis of toxins in arthropods (mainly flies and beetles) that feed on carrion. Using arthropods in a corpse or at a crime scene, investigators can determine whether toxins were present in a body at the time of death. This technique is a major advance in forensics; previously, such determinations were impossible in the case of severely decomposed bodies devoid of intoxicated tissue and bodily fluids. Ongoing research into the effects of toxins on arthropod development has also allowed better estimations of postmortem intervals.

== Effects of toxins on arthropods ==
Drugs can have a variety of effects on development rates of arthropods. Morphine, heroin, cocaine, and methamphetamine are commonly involved in cases where forensic entomology is used. The stages of growth for insects provides a basis for determining a cause in altered cycles in a specific species. An altered stage in development can often indicate toxins in the carrion on which the insects are feeding. Beetles (Order: Coleoptera) and beetle feces are often used in entomotoxicology, but the presence of toxins is often the result of the beetles' feeding on fly larvae that have been feeding on the carrion containing toxic substances. Flies (Order: Diptera) are the most commonly used insect in entomotoxicology.

Through the study of Sarcophaga (Curranea) tibialis larvae, barbiturates were found to increase the length of the larval stage of the fly, which will ultimately cause an increase in the time it takes to reach the stage of pupation. Morphine and heroin were both believed to slow down the rate of fly development. However, closer examination of the effects of heroin on fly development has shown that it actually speeds up larval growth and then decreases the development rate of the pupal stage. This actually increases the overall timing of development from egg to adult. Research of Lucilia sericata (Diptera: Calliphoridae), reared on various concentrations of morphine injected meat, found higher concentrations of morphine in shed pupal casings than in adults. Cocaine and methamphetamine also accelerate the rate of fly development.

Some effects depend on the concentration of the toxin while others simply depend on its presence. For example, cocaine (at the lethal dose) causes larvae to “develop more rapidly 36 (to 76) hours after hatching”. The amount of growth depends on the concentration of cocaine in the area being fed upon. The amount of methamphetamine, on the other hand, affects the rate of pupal development. A lethal dose of methamphetamine increases larval development through approximately the first two days and afterwards the rate drops if exposure remains at the median lethal dosage. The presence of methamphetamine was also found to cause a decrease in the maximum length of the larvae.

Along with changes in development rates, extended periods of insect feeding refrain and variation in the size of the insect during any stage of development, can also indicate the presence of toxic substances in the insect's food source.

== Examples of use ==
Since J.C. Beyer and his partners first demonstrated the ability of toxins to be recovered from maggots feeding on human remains in 1980, the use of entomotoxicology in investigations has made an emergence into the field of forensic entomology. An example of one such case involved the discovery of a 22-year-old female with a history of suicide attempts found 14 days after her death. Due to the body's advanced stage of decomposition, no organ or tissue samples were viable to screen for toxins. Through gas chromatography (GC) and thin-layer chromatography (TLC) analysis of Cochliomyia macellaria (Diptera: Calliphoridae) larvae found feeding on the woman's body, phenobarbital was detected and perceived to have been in the woman's system upon death.

=== Drug abuse detected ===
In France, Pascal Kintz and his colleagues were able to demonstrate the use of entomotoxicology to detect toxins that were not discovered during the analysis of body tissues and fluids of a body found roughly two months after death. A liquid chromatography analysis on organ tissue and Calliphoridae larvae found at the scene revealed the existence of five prescription medications. Triazolam, however, was only detected in the analysis of maggots and not in organ tissue samples. Comparative research showed increased sensitivity of toxicological analysis of Diptera samples over decomposed body tissues. A similar case involved the discovery of the remains of a 29-year-old known to abuse drugs, last seen alive five months prior. Through the use of GC and GC-MS techniques, Nolte and his partners discovered the presence of cocaine in decomposed muscle tissue and in maggots found on the body. However, due to the severity of decomposition of the muscle tissue, more suitable drug samples (devoid of decomposition byproducts) were reared from the maggots.

=== Aid determination of origin ===
Pekka Nuorteva presented the case of a young woman found severely decomposed in Ingå, Finland. Diptera larvae recovered from the body were reared to adulthood and found to contain low levels of mercury, indicating that the woman came from an area of comparatively low mercury pollution. This assumption was proven correct once the woman was identified and found to have been a student in Turku, Finland. This case demonstrated the ability of toxicological analysis to help determine origin. This case applied Nuorteva's research involving mercury and its effect on maggots. Through experimentation, it was determined that maggots (fed on fish containing mercury) possessed levels of mercury in their tissue of even greater concentration than in the tissue of the fish. Nuorteva also discovered that the presence of mercury in the maggots systems hindered their ability to enter into the pupal stage.

=== Toxin confounding of postmortem interval estimate ===
Through the analysis of specific cases, it was revealed that toxins present in a person's body upon death can confound postmortem interval estimations. An example of such a case, reported by Gunatilake and Goff, concerned the discovery of a 58-year-old male with a history of attempted suicides found dead in a crawl space in Honolulu, Hawaii last seen eight days prior. Two species of Diptera (Calliphoridae), Chrysomya megacephala and Chrysomya rufifacies, found on the corpse and tissue samples from the body revealed malathion. Investigators found it abnormal that, given the conditions, there were only two fly species found on the body and that these species revealed a postmortem interval of five days. Thus it was determined that the presence of the organophosphate malathion in the man's system delayed oviposition for a few days.

Paul Catts analyzed a case in Spokane, Washington where maggots rendered differing postmortem estimations. A 20-year-old female victim was found stabbed to death and laying in an open environment surrounded by trees. Most of the oldest maggots found on the body were approximately 6–7 mm long which suggested that they were roughly seven days old. There was, however, a very strange exception which was the retrieval of a 17.7 mm maggot which suggested an age of 3 weeks. After ruling out the possibility that the maggot had traveled onto the corpse from carrion nearby, it was assumed that there was no conceivable way a 3-week-old maggot could have been present on the corpse. Later investigations revealed that the woman had snorted cocaine shortly before her death and that the 17.7 mm maggot must have fed in the woman's nasal cavity. Research revealed that maggot development can be sped up by the ingestion of cocaine.

=== Use of shed casings and insect faeces ===
Not only are tissues from maggots used to detect toxins, shed casings and insect faeces have also been used to detect and identify toxins present in corpses upon death. An instance of this finding was demonstrated by Edward McDonough, a medical examiner in Connecticut. A mummified corpse of a middle-aged woman was found inside of her home. Prescription medicine bottles were found with labels identifying the following drugs: ampicillin, Ceclor, doxycycline, erythromycin, Elavil, Lomotil, pentazocine, and Tylenol 3. McDonough performed toxicological analyses on stomach contents and dried sections of brain and found lethal levels of amitriptyline and nortriptyline. Insect feces, shed pupal cases of Megaselia scalaris (Diptera: Phoridae), and shed larval skins of Dermestes maculates (Coleoptera: Dermestidae) were gathered from the corpse at the scene. McDonough sent these to an FBI lab which broke down the complex structures of the samples using strong acids and bases and freed the toxins for analysis. The cast pupal cases and larval skins were also found to contain amitriptyline and nortriptyline. Larger concentrations were discovered in the pupal cases because phorid flies prefer to feed on softer tissues. The hide beetle larval skins revealed lower concentrations of the drugs because these beetles prefer to feed on dry, mummified bodies. The use of pupal cases and larval skins allows investigators to detect toxins in a body years after death.

== Limitations ==
Further research should be conducted in order to fill the gaps in entomotoxicology. Such areas as bioaccumulation, insect metabolism of drugs, and quantitative analyses of insect evidence have only begun to be researched. Because it is a relatively new branch of forensic entomology, entomotoxicology has its limitations. According to Pounder's research, there is no correlation between the drug concentration in tissue and the larvae feeding on that tissue. Entomological specimens make for excellent qualitative toxicological specimens. There is, however, a lack of research in the way of developing an assessment that can quantify the concentration of a drug in tissue using entomological evidence. One reason for this is that a drug can only be detected in larvae when the rate of absorption exceeds the rate of elimination. demonstrated this theory using Calliphora vicina larvae reared on human skeletal muscle obtained from cases of co-proxamol and amitriptyline overdose. Samples of pupae and third instar larvae no longer contained concentrations of the drugs, suggesting that drugs do not bioaccumulate over the entire life-cycle of larvae. This leads entomologists to theorize that toxins are eliminated from the larvae's system over time if they are not receiving a constant supply of the toxin.
