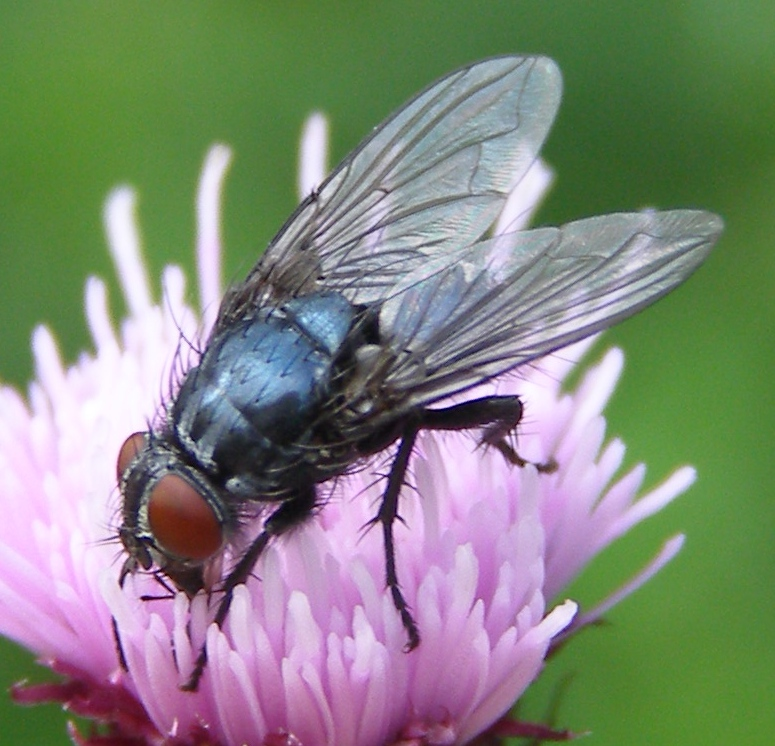
- A female Melinda sp.

Scientific classification
- Domain: Eukaryota
- Kingdom: Animalia
- Phylum: Arthropoda
- Class: Insecta
- Order: Diptera
- Family: Calliphoridae
- Subfamily: Melanomyinae
- Genus: Melinda; Robineau-Desvoidy, 1830

Type species
- Melinda gentilis Robineau-Desvoidy, 1830

Species
- See text

Synonyms
- Paurothrix Bezzi, 1927; Xerophilophaga Enderlein, 1933

= Melinda (fly) =

Genus of flies

Melinda is a genus of flies in the family Calliphoridae. In general, little is known of their biology. A few species have been reared from snails. One – Melinda gentilis – is parasitic in the snails Helicella virgata and Goniodiseus rotundata, and Melinda itoi is a parasite of the snail Acusta despecta sieboldiana.

== Distribution ==
Most species are Oriental and Australian, but are found throughout the Old World tropical regions, and some parts the Palaearctic region such as North Africa, Europe, China, and Japan. In the Australian region, it is found in Fiji and the Samoan Islands.

== Species ==
These species belong to the genus Melinda:

- Melinda abdominalis (Malloch, 1931)
- Melinda apicihamata Feng & Xue, 1998
- Melinda aterifemora (Feng, 2003)
- Melinda auriceps (Malloch, 1931)
- Melinda bengalensis Nandi, 1994
- Melinda bisetosa (Bezzi, 1927)
- Melinda blaesostyla (Feng, Chen & Fan, 1992)
- Melinda brachyphalla (Feng, Chen & Fan, 1992)
- Melinda chamaensis Singh & Sidhu, 2007
- Melinda chandigarhensis Singh & Sidhu, 2007
- Melinda chuanbeiensis (Chen & Fan, 1993)
- Melinda cognata (Meigen, 1830)
- Melinda crinitarsis (Villeneuve, 1927)
- Melinda dasysternita Chen, Deng & Fan, 1992
- Melinda dubia (Malloch, 1931)
- Melinda elegans Kurahashi, 1970
- Melinda emeishanensis (Fan, 1997)
- Melinda falciloba (Hsue, 1979)
- Melinda flavibasis (Malloch, 1931)
- Melinda flavipennis Kurahashi, 1986
- Melinda gentilis Robineau-Desvoidy, 1830 (= cognata Meigen, 1830)
- Melinda gibbosa Chen, Deng & Fan, 1992
- Melinda gonggashanensis Chen & Fan, 1993
- Melinda grisea Malloch, 1927
- Melinda hunanensis (Chen, Zhang & Fan, 1992)
- Melinda indica Kurahashi, 1970
- Melinda io Kurahashi, 1965
- Melinda itoi Kano, 1962 (temperate Asia)
- Melinda kangdingensis (Chen & Fan, 1993)
- Melinda kocki Malloch, 1927
- Melinda maai Kurahashi, 1970
- Melinda malaisei Kurahashi, 1970
- Melinda mindanaoa Kurahashi, 1992
- Melinda mingshanna (Feng, 2003)
- Melinda nepalica Kurahashi & Thapa, 1994
- Melinda nigra (Kurahashi, 1965)
- Melinda nigrella Chen, Li & Chang, 1988
- Melinda nigricans (Villeneuve, 1927)
- Melinda nigripalpis Kurahashi & Tumrasvin, 1979
- Melinda nitidapex (Villeneuve, 1933)
- Melinda nuortevae Kurahashi, 1970
- Melinda okazakii Kano, 1962
- Melinda ponti Kurahashi, 1970
- Melinda pusilla (Villeneuve, 1927)
- Melinda pygialis (Villeneuve, 1937)
- Melinda ruficornis Kurahashi, 1986
- Melinda scutellata (Senior-White, 1923)
- Melinda septentrionis Xue, 1983
- Melinda sichuanica Qian & Feng, 2016
- Melinda sugiyami Kurahashi & Thapa, 1994
- Melinda sumatrana (Malloch, 1927)
- Melinda tribulis (Villeneuve, 1933)
- Melinda tsukamotoi Kano, 1962
- Melinda vanemdeni Kurahashi, 1970
- Melinda viridicyanea (Robineau-Desvoidy, 1830)
- Melinda xiphophora (Bezzi, 1927)
- Melinda yunnanensis Fan, 1997
