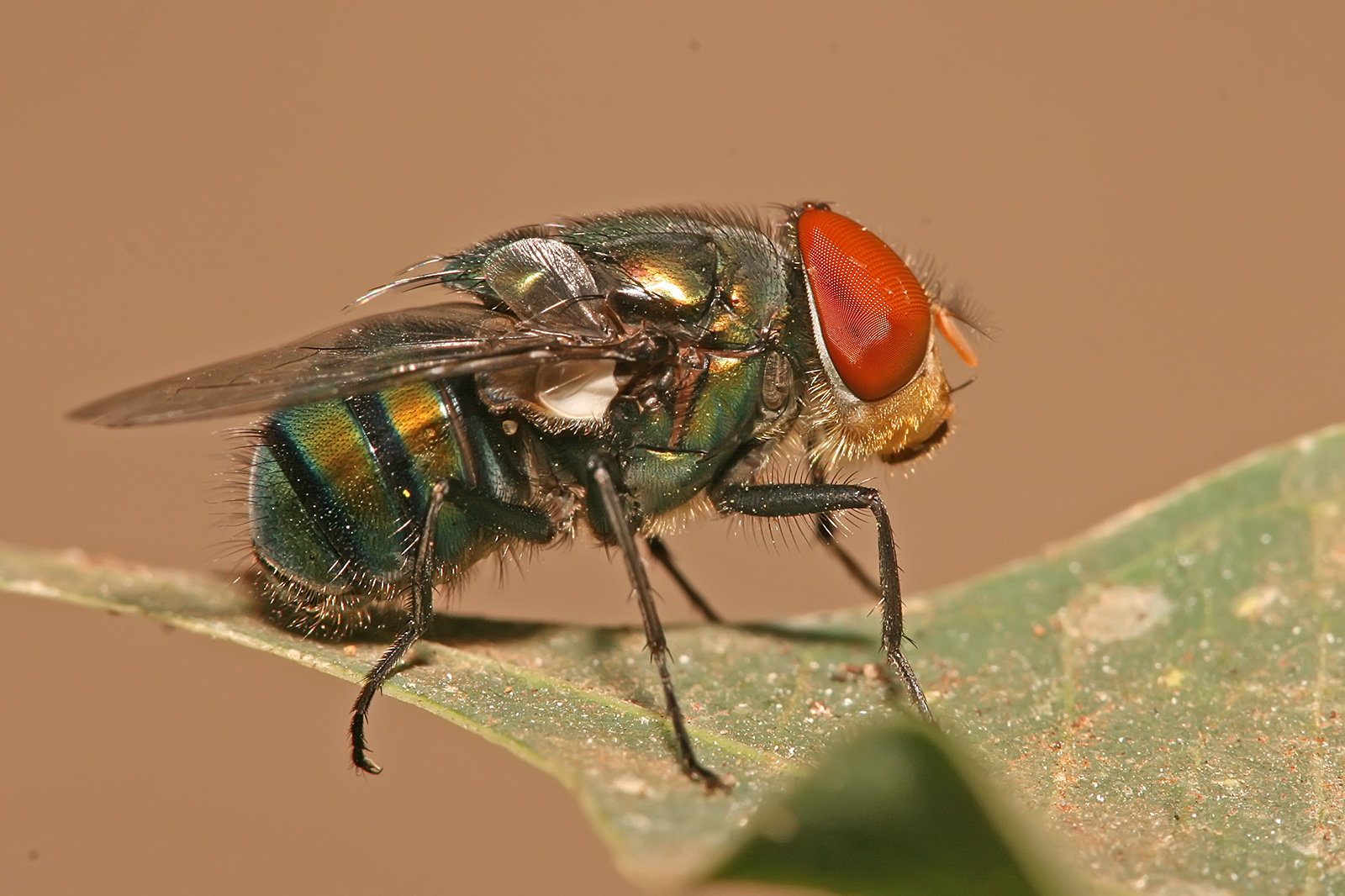
- Male Chrysomya megacephala

Scientific classification
- Kingdom: Animalia
- Phylum: Arthropoda
- Clade: Pancrustacea
- Class: Insecta
- Order: Diptera
- Superfamily: Oestroidea
- Family: Calliphoridae; Brauer & Bergenstamm, 1889

Subfamilies
- Bengaliinae; Calliphorinae; Chrysomyinae; Helicoboscinae; Luciliinae; Melanomyinae; Rhinophorinae

= Calliphoridae =

Family of flies

The Calliphoridae (commonly known as blowflies, blow flies, blow-flies, carrion flies, bluebottles, or greenbottles) are a family of insects in the order Diptera, with almost 1,900 known species. The maggot larvae, often used as fishing bait, are known as gentles. The family is known to be polyphyletic, but much remains disputed regarding proper treatment of the constituent taxa, some of which are occasionally accorded family status (e.g., Bengaliidae and Helicoboscidae).

== Description ==
=== Characteristics ===
Calliphoridae adults are commonly shiny with metallic colouring, often with blue, green, or black thoraces and abdomens. Antennae are three-segmented and aristate. The aristae are plumose their entire length, and the second antennal segment is distinctly grooved. Members of Calliphoridae have branched Rs 2 veins, frontal sutures are present, and calypters are well developed. The characteristics and arrangements of hairlike bristles are used to differentiate among members of this family. All blowflies have bristles located on the meron. Having two notopleural bristles and a hindmost posthumeral bristle located lateral to presutural bristle are characteristics to look for when identifying this family.

The thorax has the continuous dorsal suture across the middle, along with well-defined posterior calli. The postscutellum is absent or weakly developed. The costa is unbroken and the subcosta is apparent on the insect.

=== Development ===
Most species of blowflies studied thus far are anautogenous; a female requires a substantial amount of protein to develop mature eggs within her ovaries (about 800 μg per pair of ovaries in Phormia regina). The current theory is that females visit carrion both for protein and egg laying, but this remains to be proven. Blowfly eggs, usually yellowish or white in color, are about 1.5 mm × 0.4 mm, and when laid, look like rice grains. While the female blowfly typically lays 150–200 eggs per batch, she is usually iteroparous, laying around 2,000 eggs during the course of her life. The sex ratio of blowfly eggs is usually 50:50, but one exception is females from two species of the genus Chrysomya (C. rufifacies and C. albiceps), which are either arrhenogenic (laying only male offspring) or thelygenic (laying only female offspring).

Hatching from an egg to the first larval stage takes about 8 hours to a day. Larvae have three stages of development (instars); each stage is separated by a molting event. The instars are separable by examining the posterior spiracles, or openings to the breathing system.

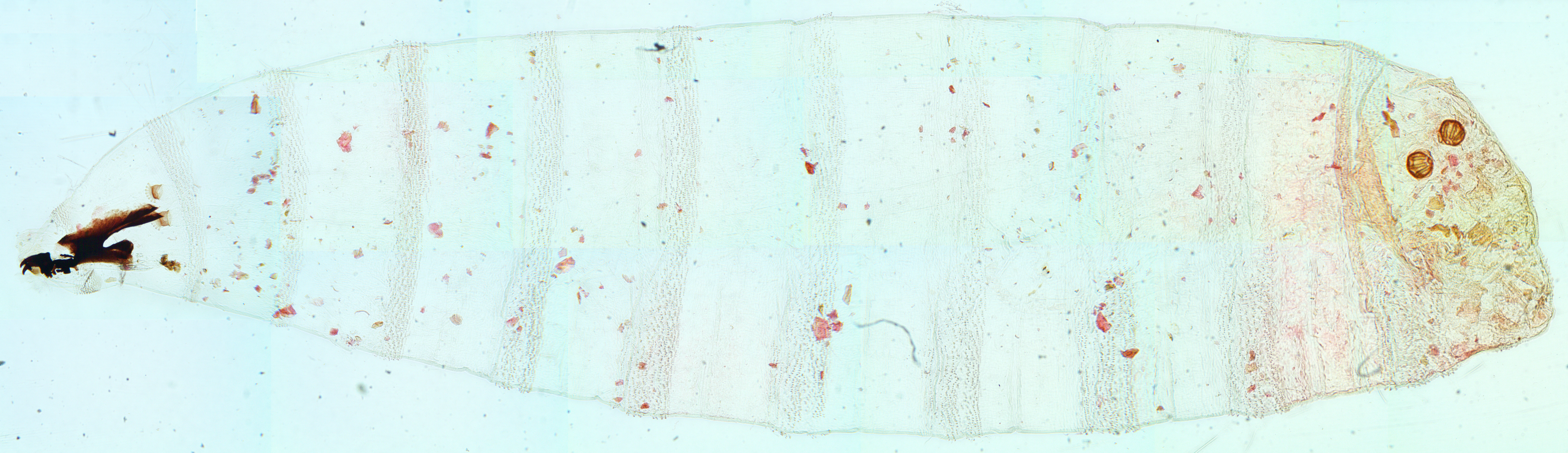
Larva of Calliphora erythrocephala. The exoskeleton is about 16.5mm long. The mouth hooks are the dark objects on the left

The larvae use proteolytic enzymes in their excreta (as well as mechanical grinding by mouth hooks) to break down proteins on the livestock or corpse on which they are feeding. Blowflies are poikilothermic – the rate at which they grow and develop is highly dependent on temperature and species. Under room temperature (about 20 °C), the black blowfly Phormia regina can change from egg to pupa in 150–266 hours (six to 11 days). When the third larval stage is complete, it leaves the corpse and burrows into the ground to pupate, emerging as an adult 7–14 days later.

=== Food sources ===
Adult blowflies are occasional pollinators, being attracted to flowers with strong odors resembling rotting meat, such as the American pawpaw or dead horse arum. Little doubt remains that these flies use nectar as a source of carbohydrates to fuel flight, but just how and when this happens is unknown. One study showed the visual stimulus a blowfly receives from its compound eyes is responsible for causing its legs to extend from its flight position and allow it to land on any surface.

Larvae of most species are scavengers of carrion and dung, and most likely constitute the majority of the maggots found in such material, although they are not uncommonly found in close association with other dipterous larvae from the families Sarcophagidae and Muscidae, and many other acalyptrate muscoid flies.

=== Predators ===
Predators of blowflies include spiders, beetles, frogs, and birds, including chickens.

In the Chihuahuan desert of Mexico, a fungus, Furia vomitoriae (Rozsypal) Humber (1989) (from the family of Entomophthoraceae) affects bluebottle flies. It forms masses of conidiophores erupting through the intersegmental areas (or clear bands) on the abdominal dorsum of the flies and eventually kills them.

=== Host-microbe interactions ===
Blowflies (Calliphoridae) feed and develop in microbially dense and chemically dynamic substrates such as carrion and necrotic wounds. Because blowflies, their larvae and necrobiome-associated microbiota engage in resource partitioning, blowflies often act as both pathogen vectors and engage in facultative bacterivory. Bacterial digestion by Lucilia sericata larvae is well-established for some microorganisms like Escherichia coli but it has been hypothesized that other microbial taxa are spared or excluded from significant rates of digestion. While it is known that Providencia spp. bacteria are detrimental to Cochliomyia macellaria larvae under gnotobiotic conditions and several blowfly species benefit from feeding under gnotobiotic, "mixed microbial environments", in general, the taxonomic specificities and causal mechanisms behind this phenomenon — which would help delineate passive microbial persistence in the animal's tissues from parasitism or mutualism (symbiosis) — remains unknown. For example, a study showed that Lactobacillus, Proteus, Diaphorobacter, and Morganella were the main taxa associated with third larval instar Lucilia sericata salivary glands (in decreasing order); which suggests an apparent balance between lactic acid-producing Gram-positive and urease-producing or otherwise ammoniagenic Gram-negative microbial taxa. Despite this aforementioned insight, dedicated studies on the effect of altered substrate pH levels on blowfly larvae development have yet to connect their findings to either blowfly host-specific pH preferences, fermentation, or microbial activity in general; the last of which is the main contributor towards pH modulation in necrotic biomass substrates. Despite these unknowns, a causal mechanism of blowfly-larval microbiome selection and mechanisms governing larval microbiome community assembly was investigated using axenic Lucilia sericata larvae-microbe exposure assays. It was found that larvae mount distinct immune transcriptional programs when challenged with Pseudomonas aeruginosa versus Acinetobacter baumannii, suggesting that blowflies do not deploy a generic “one-size-fits-all” immune response but instead engage pathogen-specific signaling through the IMD and Toll pathways.

Consistent with this immunological specificity, comparative surveys of wild Lucilia sericata and Phormia regina show that microbiome composition is strongly associated with host species identity, regardless of shared environments or sampling conditions. Taxonomic profiles differ significantly between species, with genera such as Ignatzschineria and Dysgonomonas enriched in P. regina, while Vagococcus and Escherichia–Shigella are more prevalent in L. sericata. These patterns support a role for host filtering in blowfly-microbiome assembly, and indicate that species-level differences in microbial associations may translate into differing risks of pathogen carriage.

== Diversity ==
About 1,900 species of blowflies are known, with 120 species in the Neotropics, and a large number of species in Africa and Southern Europe. Their typical habitats are temperate to tropical areas that provide a layer of loose, damp soil and litter where larvae may thrive and pupate.

== Genera ==
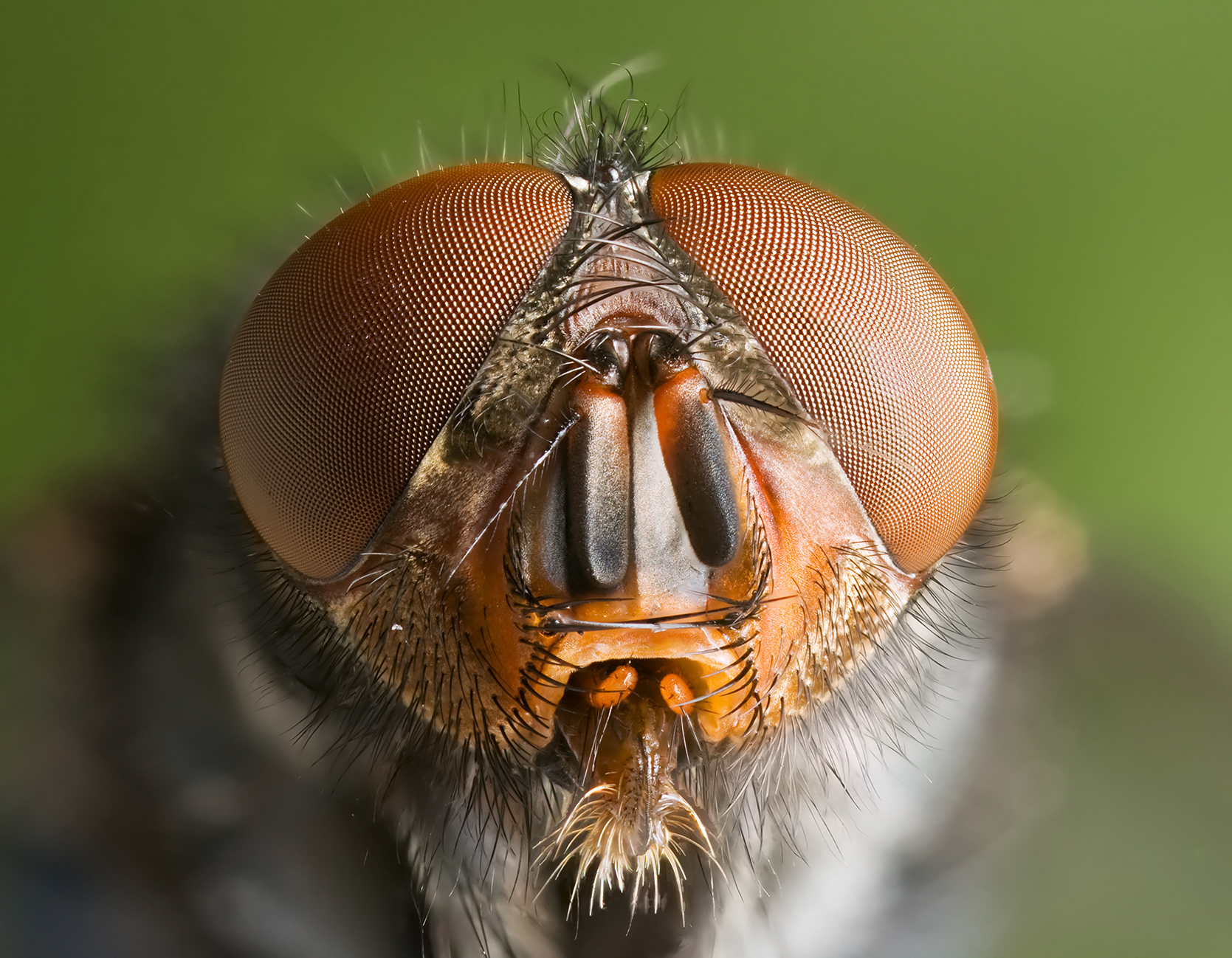
Close-up of the head of Calliphora vomitoria

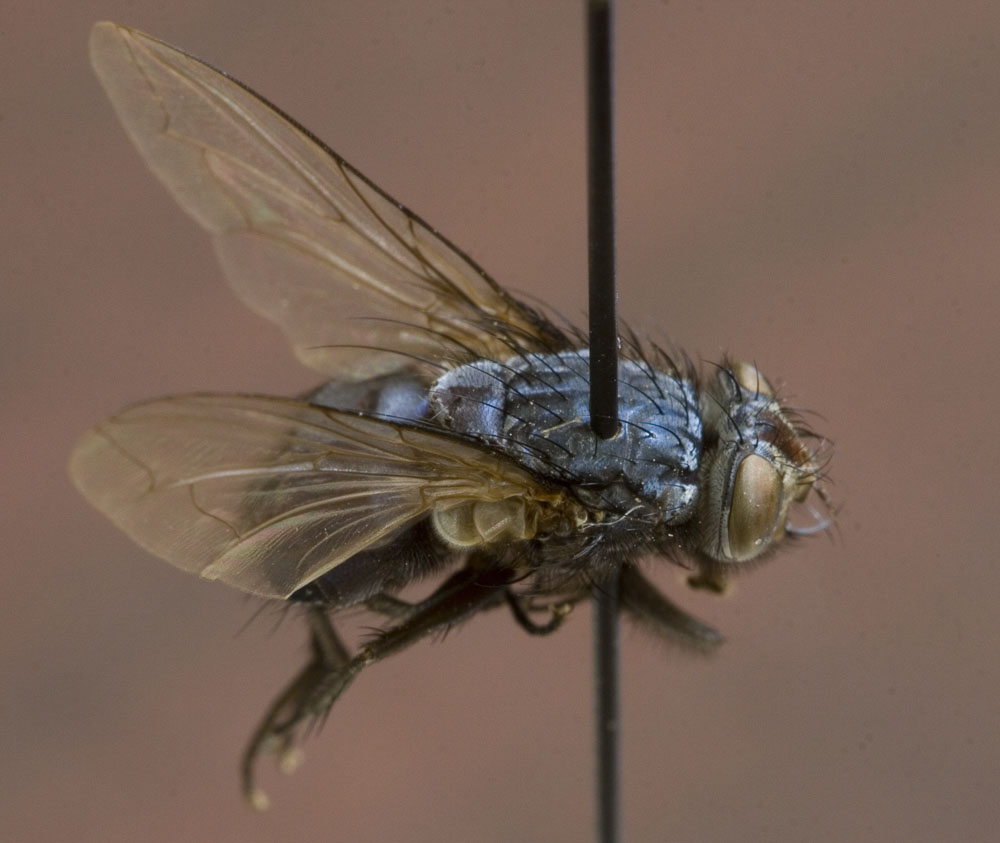
A Calliphora livida fly specimen

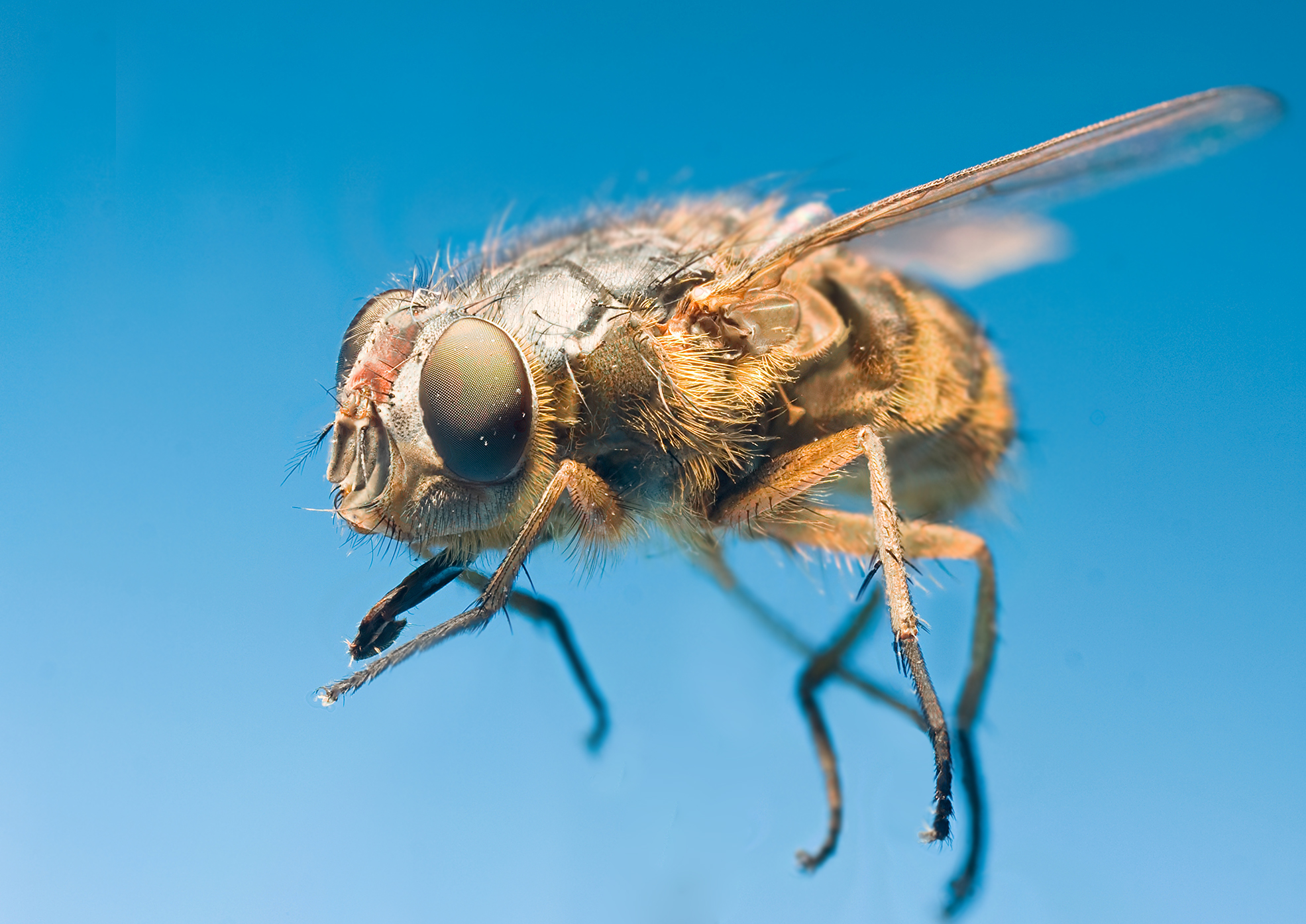
Calliphora hilli

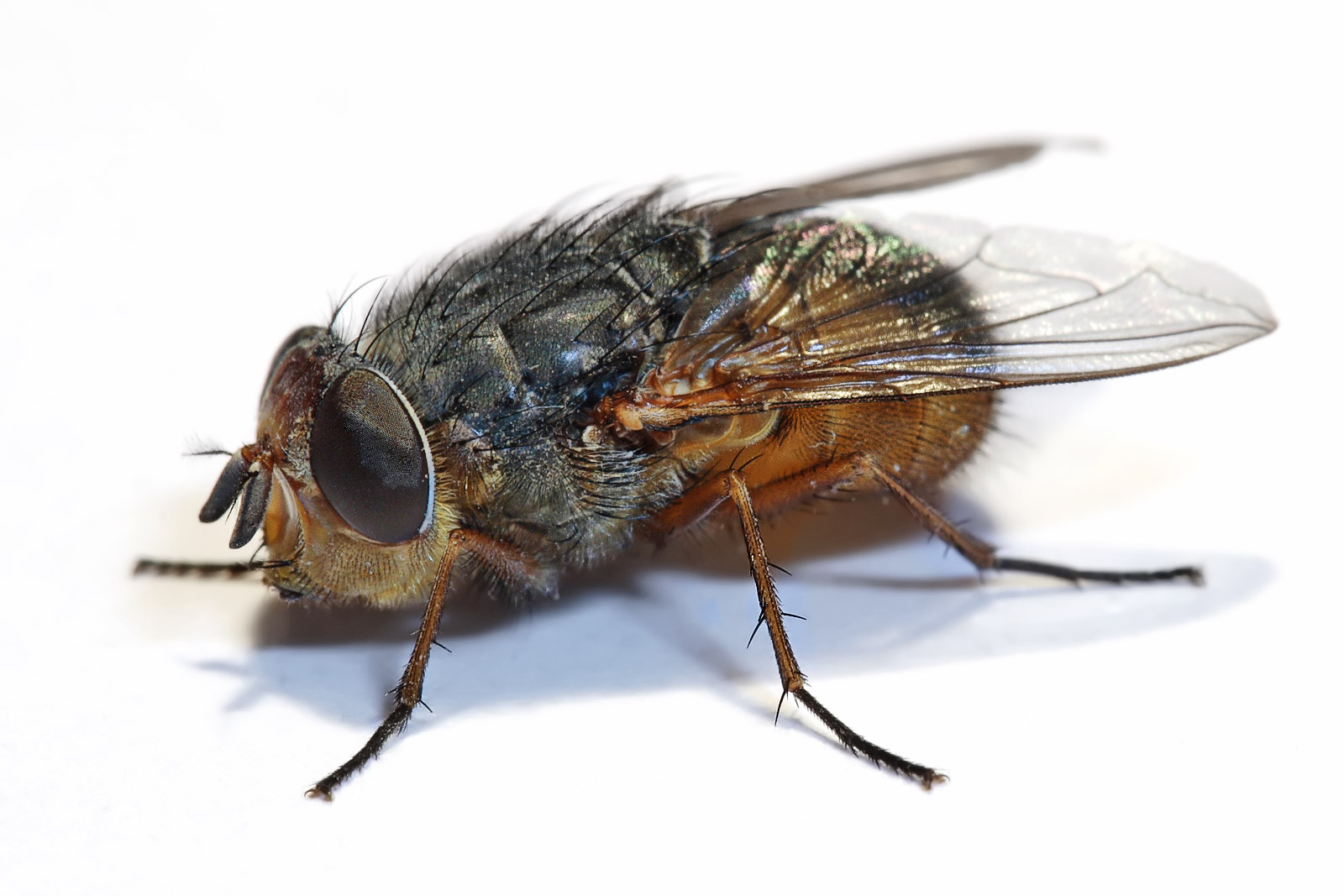
Calliphora augur

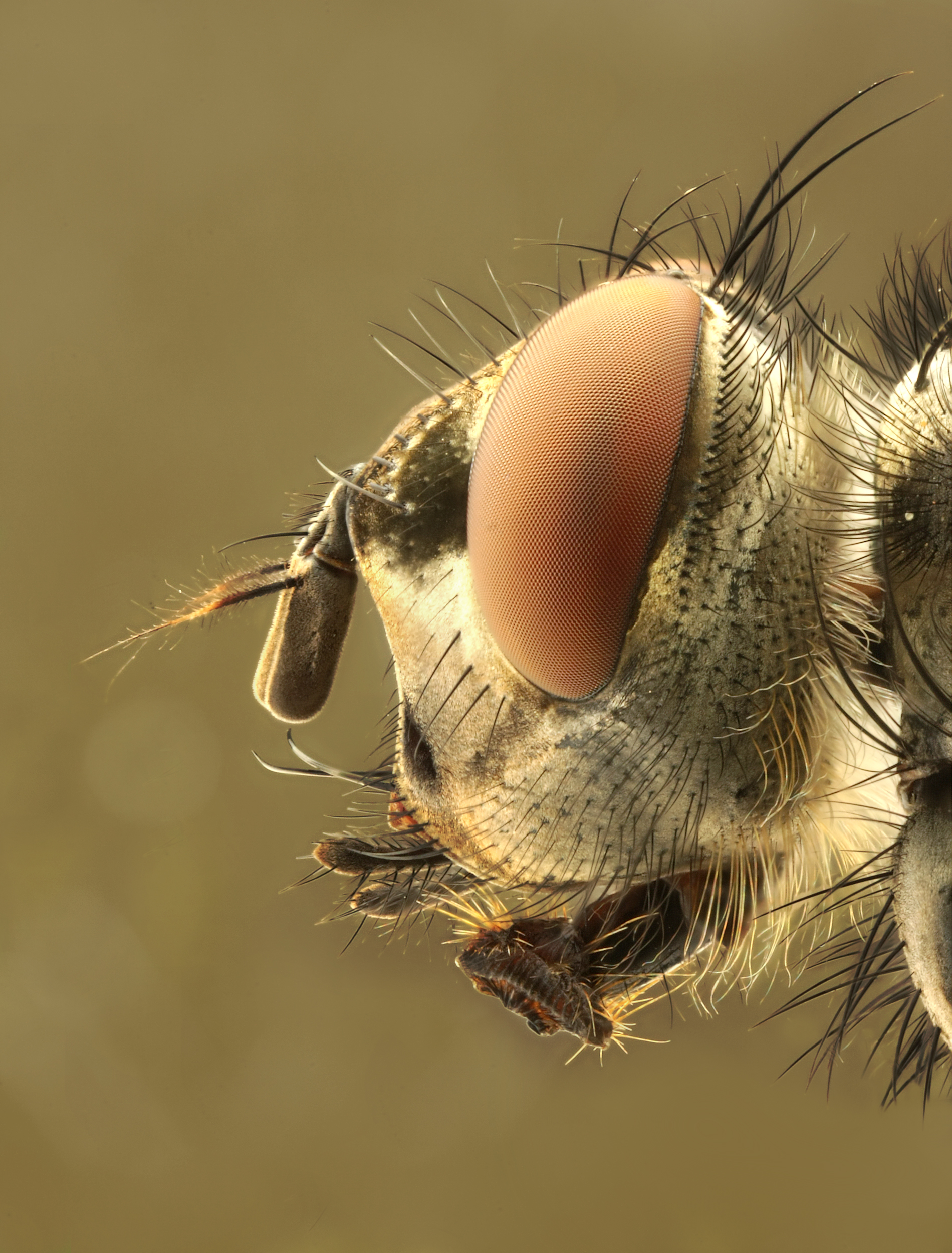
A close-up of the head of a Calliphora

Sources: MYIA, FE, Nomina, A/O DC

This is a selected list of genera from the Palearctic, Nearctic, Malaysia (Japan), and Australasia:

- Abago Grunin, 1966
- Amenia Robineau-Desvoidy, 1830
- Angioneura Brauer & Bergenstamm, 1893
- Apaulina Hall, 1948
- Cynomya Robineau-Desvoidy, 1830
- Aphyssura Hardy, 1940
- Auchmeromyia Brauer & Bergenstamm, 1891
- Bellardia Robineau-Desvoidy, 1863
- Bengalia Robineau-Desvoidy, 1830
- Booponus Aldrich, 1923
- Boreellus Aldrich & Shannon, 1923
- Caiusa Surcouf, 1920
- Calliphora Robineau-Desvoidy, 1830
- Callitroga Hall, 1948
- Catapicephala Macquart, 1851
- Chloroprocta Wulp, 1896
- Chrysomya Robineau-Desvoidy, 1830
- Cochliomyia Townsend, 1915
- Compsomyiops Townsend, 1918
- Cordylobia Gruenberg, 1903
- Cyanus Hall, 1948
- Dyscritomyia Grimshaw, 1901
- Eggisops Rondani, 1862
- Eucalliphora Townsend, 1908
- Eumesembrinella Townsend, 1931
- Eurychaeta Brauer & Bergenstamm, 1891
- Euphumosia Malloch, 1926
- Hemilucilia Brauer, 1895
- Hemipyrellia Townsend, 1918
- Lucilia Robineau-Desvoidy, 1830
- Melanomya Rondani, 1856
- Melinda Robineau-Desvoidy, 1830
- Mufetiella Villeneuve, 1933
- Nesodexia Villeneuve, 1911
- Neta Shannon, 1926
- Onesia Robineau-Desvoidy, 1830
- Opsodexia Townsend, 1915
- Pachychoeromyia Villeneuve, 1920
- Paralucilia Brauer & Bergenstamm, 1891
- Paramenia Brauer & Bergenstamm, 1889
- Paraplatytropesa Crosskey, 1965
- Phormia Robineau-Desvoidy, 1830
- Phumosia Robineau-Desvoidy, 1830
- Platytropesa Macquart, 1851
- Polleniopsis Townsend, 1917
- Prosthetosoma Silvestri, 1920
- Protocalliphora Hough, 1899
- Protophormia Townsend, 1908
- Ptilonesia Bezzi, 1927
- Rhynchoestrus Séguy, 1926
- Sarconesia Bigot, 1857
- Silbomyia Macquart, 1843
- Stilbomyella Malloch, 1935
- Toxotarsus Macquart, 1851
- Triceratopyga Rohdendorf, 1931
- Tricyclea Wulp, 1885
- TricycleopsisVilleneuve, 1927
- Trypocalliphora Peus, 1960
- Xenocalliphora Malloch, 1924

== Economic importance ==
=== Myiasis ===
Blowflies have caught the interest of researchers in a variety of fields, although the large body of literature on calliphorids has been concentrated on solving the problem of myiasis in livestock. The sheep blowfly Lucilia cuprina causes the Australian sheep industry an estimated AU$170 million a year in losses.

The most common causes of myiasis in humans and animals are the three dipteran families Oestridae, Calliphoridae, and Sarcophagidae. Myiasis in humans is clinically categorized in six ways: dermal and subdermal, facial cavity, wound or trauma, gastrointestinal, vaginal, and generalized. If found in humans, the dipteran larvae are usually in their first instar. The only treatment necessary is just to remove the maggots, and the patient heals naturally. Whilst not strictly a myiasis species, the Congo floor maggot feeds on mammal blood, occasionally human.

=== Screwworms ===
The New World primary screwworm (Cochliomyia hominivorax), once a major pest in Southern United States, had been eradicated from the United States, Mexico, and Central America through an extensive release program by the USDA of sterilized males. The USDA maintains a sterile screwworm fly production plant and release program in the eastern half of the Republic of Panama to keep fertile screwworms from migrating north. Currently, this species is limited to lowland tropical countries in South America and some Caribbean islands.

The Old World primary screwworm (Chrysomya bezziana) is an obligate parasite of mammals. This fly is distributed throughout the Old World, including Southeast Asia, tropical and subtropical Africa, some countries in the Middle East, India, the Malay Peninsula, the Indonesian and Philippine Islands, and Papua New Guinea.

The secondary screwworm (Cochliomyia macellaria) has become one of the principal species on which to base post mortem interval estimations because its succession and occurrence on decomposing remains has been well defined. The secondary screwworm is found throughout the United States and the American tropics, and in southern Canada during summers. This species is one of the most common species found on decomposing remains in the US South.

=== Maggot therapy ===
Maggot debridement therapy (MDT) is the medical use of selected, laboratory-raised fly larvae for cleaning nonhealing wounds. Medicinal maggots perform debridement by selectively eating only dead tissue. Lucilia sericata (Phaenicia sericata), or the common green bottlefly, is the preferred species used in maggot therapy. MDT can be used to treat pressure ulcers, diabetic foot wounds, venous stasis ulcers, and postsurgical wounds.

=== Disease ===
Adults may be vectors of pathogens of diseases such as dysentery. Flies, most commonly Calliphoridae, have frequently been associated with disease transmission in humans and animals, as well as myiasis. Studies and research have linked Calliphora and Lucilia to vectors of causal agents of bacterial infections. These larvae, commonly seen on decaying bodies, feed on carrion while the adults can be necrophagous or vegetative. During the process of decay, microorganisms (e.g. Mycobacterium) may be released through the body. Flies arrive at the scene and lay their eggs. The larvae begin eating and breaking down the corpse, simultaneously ingesting these organisms which is the first step of one transmission route.

The bacterium which causes paratuberculosis in cattle, pigs and birds (M. a. avium) has been isolated and recovered from these flies through several different experiments.

Other potential and threatening diseases include rabbit haemorrhagic disease in New Zealand and flystrike. Although strike is not limited to blow flies, these maggots are a major source of this skin invasion, causing lesions, which, if severe enough, may be lethal. Strike starts when blow flies lay eggs in a wound or fecal material present on the sheep. When the maggots hatch, they begin feeding on the sheep and thus irritating it. As soon as the first wave of maggots hatch, they attract more blow flies, causing the strike. Insecticides are available for blow fly prevention (typically containing cypermethrin), and precautionary measures may be taken, such as docking tails, shearing, and keeping the sheep healthy overall.

Salmonellosis has also been proven to be transmitted by the blow fly through saliva, feces and direct contact by the flies' tarsi. Adult flies may be able to spread pathogens via their sponging mouthparts, vomit, intestinal tract, sticky pads of their feet, or even their body or leg hairs.

As the flies are vectors of many diseases, the importance of identifying the transmissible agents, the route of transmission, and prevention and treatments in the event of contact are becoming increasingly important. With the ability to lay hundreds of eggs in a lifetime and the presence of thousands of larvae at a time in such close proximity, the potential for transmission is high, especially at ideal temperatures.

=== Pollination ===
Calliphoridae are, alongside managed and wild bees, likely to be the main crop pollinating insect. They visit (and thus may pollinate) flowers of a wide range of plants, including crop plants (e.g. avocado, mango, onion, leek, carrot, cauliflower). Their sponging mouthparts mean that when visiting flowers, their head and upper body must broadly contact the inside of the flower. They have numerous hairs, including on the head and thorax, which may help them carry pollen, and indeed calliphorids in the wild have been observed carrying large amounts of pollen. Compared to honey bees, blow flies are active under a broader range of environmental conditions. However, it is unknown how their pollination abilities compare to those of bees, there are few studies assessing their contribution to pollination, and the exact species that pollinate are often not identified.

== Forensic importance ==
Blow flies are usually the first insects to come in contact with carrion because they have the ability to smell dead animal matter from up to 1 mi (1.6 km) away. Upon reaching the carrion, females deposit eggs on it. Since development is highly predictable if the ambient temperature is known, blow flies are considered a valuable tool in forensic science. Blow flies are used forensically to estimate the minimum post mortem interval (PMI_{min}) for human corpses. Traditional estimations of time since death are generally unreliable after 72 hours and often entomologists are the only officials capable of generating an accurate approximate time interval. The specialized discipline related to this practice is known as forensic entomology.

In addition to being used to estimate the PMI_{min}, assuming colonization occurred after death, blow fly specimens found infesting a human corpse are used to determine if the corpse was relocated or if the individual ingested narcotics prior to death.

Calliphora vicina and Cynomya mortuorum are important flies of forensic entomology. Other forensically important Calliphoridae are Phormia regina, Calliphora vomitoria, Calliphora livida, Lucilia cuprina, Lucilia sericata, Lucilia illustris, Chrysomya rufifacies, Chrysomya megacephala, Cochliomyia macellaria, and Protophormia terraenovae.

== Identification ==
- Fritz Konrad Ernst Zumpt Calliphorinae, in Lindner, E. Fliegen Palaearkt. Reg. 64i, 140 p. (1956)
- Fan, C. T. Key to the common synanthropic flies of China. Peking [= Beijing]. xv + 330 p. In Chinese but really excellent illustrations. (1965).
- Kano, R. and Shinonaga, S. Calliphoridae (Insecta: Diptera) (Fauna Japonica), Tokyo Biogeographical Society of Japan, Tokyo.( 1968). In English.
- Lehrer, A. Z., Diptera. Familia Calliphoridae. In: Fauna R.S.R., Insecta, vol. XI,(12), Edit. R.S.R., Bucuresti, 1972, 245 p. In Romanian.
- Rognes, K. Blowflies (Diptera: Calliphoridae) of Fennoscandia and Denmark. Fauna Entomologica Scandinavica, Volume 24. E. J. Brill/Scandinavian Science Press Ltd. Leiden.(1991).
