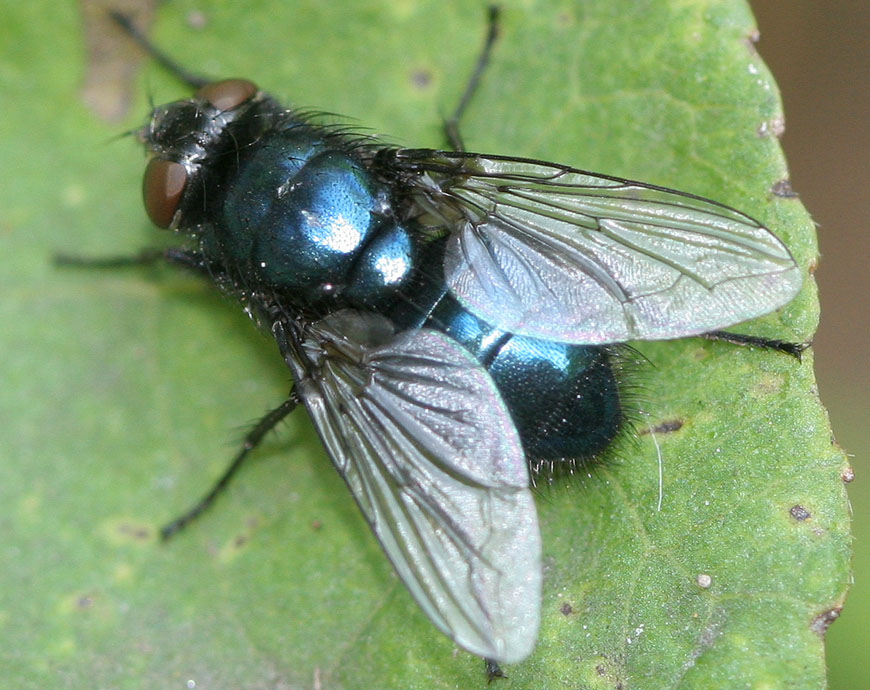

Scientific classification
- Domain: Eukaryota
- Kingdom: Animalia
- Phylum: Arthropoda
- Class: Insecta
- Order: Diptera
- Family: Calliphoridae
- Genus: Protophormia; Townsend, 1908

= Protophormia =

Genus of flies

Protophormia is a genus of flies belonging to the family Calliphoridae.

The species of this genus are found in Eurasia and Northern America.

Species:

- Protophormia atriceps (Zetterstedt, 1845)
- Protophormia terraenovae (Robineau-Desvoidy, 1830)
