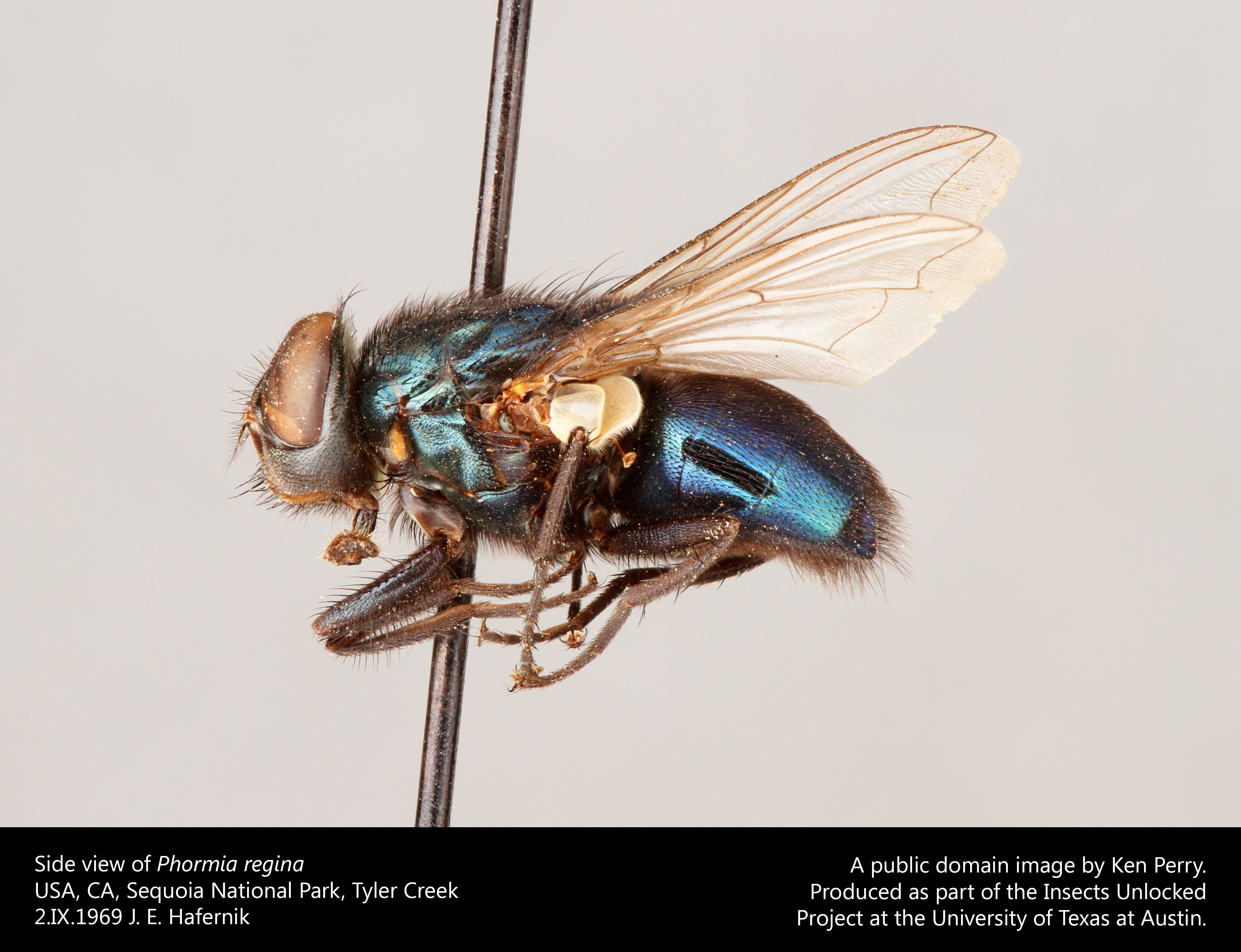

Scientific classification
- Kingdom: Animalia
- Phylum: Arthropoda
- Clade: Pancrustacea
- Class: Insecta
- Order: Diptera
- Family: Calliphoridae
- Subfamily: Chrysomyinae
- Genus: Phormia; Robineau-Desvoidy, 1830
- Species: P. regina

Binomial name
- Phormia regina (Meigen, 1826)

Synonyms
- List: Musca regina Meigen, 1826; Lucilia rufipalpis Jaennicke, 1867; Lucilia stigmaticalis Thomson, 1869; Musca accincta Wiedemann, 1830; Musca bicolor Walker, 1853; Musca mollis Walker, 1849; Musca proxima Walker, 1853; Musca thalassina Meigen, 1826; Phormia aurisquama Villeneuve, 1928; Phormia cuprea Robineau-Desvoidy, 1830; Phormia fulvifacies Robineau-Desvoidy, 1830; Phormia philadelphica Robineau-Desvoidy, 1830; Phormia squalens Robineau-Desvoidy, 1830; Phormia vittata Robineau-Desvoidy, 1830; Somomya lucens Rondani, 1862; Somomya nigrina Bigot, 1877; Somomya rufigena Bigot, 1888; Somomya rupicola Bigot, 1888; Trypocalliphora aurisquama (Villeneuve, 1928)

= Phormia =

Species of fly

Phormia regina, the black blow fly, belongs to the blow fly family Calliphoridae and was first described by Johann Wilhelm Meigen. It is the only species in the genus Phormia.

The black blow fly's wings are specialized with a sharp bend. These flies also have well-developed calypters. Blow flies generally are about the size of a house fly or a little larger, and many are metallic blue or green in color. Key characteristics of this species include black gena, mostly white calypters, and anterior thoracic spiracles that appear to be orange yellow due to being surrounded by bright orange setae.

Phormia regina is especially important to forensic entomology. Female P. regina, like other blow flies in the family Calliphoridae, oviposit their eggs on carrion, where they hatch. The larvae develop through three instar stages until pupation. Adult black blow flies aggregate on feces in order to mate. The success of these mating interactions has been studied and appears to be related to size and diet of the adult flies. Following successful mating encounters, the adult females are then attracted to decaying material rather quickly for oviposition, allowing forensic entomologists to use development stages of larvae as a clue in determining an approximate time of death. P. regina are extremely common in the United States and other areas in North America. Combined with their importance in forensic entomology, these flies have been relatively well studied, particularly for variables affecting their development.

== Taxonomy ==
Phormia regina was described by the German entomologist Johann Wilhelm Meigen in 1826. Its specific epithet is derived from the Latin word regina meaning 'queen'.

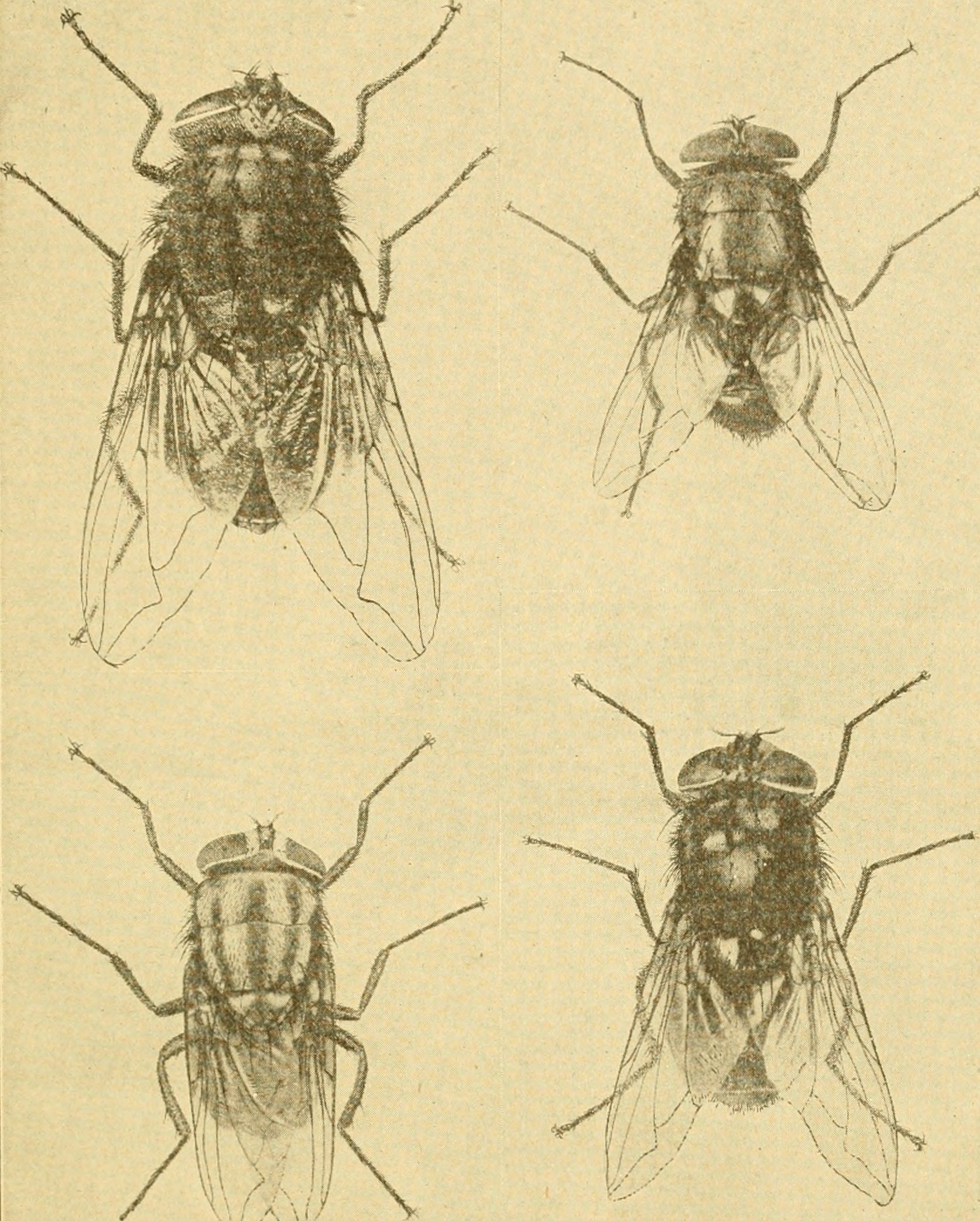
Sanitary entomology; the entomology of disease, hygiene and sanitation (1921)

== Description ==
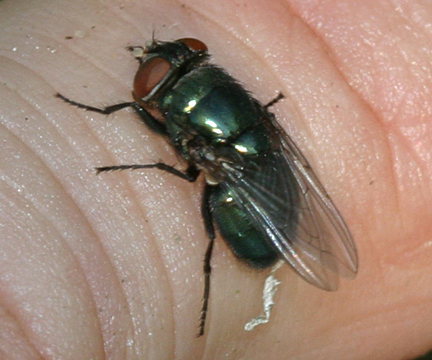
Another phormia

Phormia regina adults are metallic blue or green in color and have a distinctive set of orange setae near the anterior thoracic spiracle. They are also recognizable by their black gena (the side of the head below eye level), mostly white calypteres, and the distinctive bend in their wings.

== Distribution ==
Phormia regina is commonly found across the entirety of the United States as well as across other regions in North America

== Habitat ==
Phormia regina can be found on human corpses, animal carcasses, and feces. Researchers have observed these flies on a wide variety of animal excrement, but at least in the northwestern United States, they exhibit a preference for human, mink, and swine feces. P. regina is predominantly found in the northern United States during spring and summer months, but in the winter they are localized to more southern regions. This localization is tentatively linked to the importance of temperature on their development. These flies prefer rural areas, especially near water sources, as opposed to urban spaces—at least in the San Francisco Bay Area.

== Life history ==
The life cycle and development of Phormia regina is similar to that of most other Dipteran species, in which females oviposit their eggs onto a nutrient substrate. Then, after hatching, the larvae feed throughout three instar stages until they have stored up enough calories to commence pupation and finally emerge as adult blow flies. Each transition from first, second, and third instar is marked by a molt, and eventually the third-instar larvae develop sclerotized (hardened) casings which envelop and protect them throughout metamorphosis.

=== Larval development ===
Relatively few studies have been conducted on the adults of this species in comparison to those on larval development, mostly due to the importance of blow fly larvae in determining the post mortem interval (PMI) of corpses during investigations by forensic entomologists. For this reason, many researchers have conducted experiments to investigate the effect of various environmental factors on the duration time of larval development in this species (as well as many others).

Because the larval life cycle of this species is dependent on a climate with temperatures ranging from 12.7°C (55°F) to 35 °C (95 °F), it tends to inhabit the northern regions of the United States during summer months and southern regions in the winter. Researchers have discovered that at 40 to 45 °C, larval development occurs normally until the prepupal stage, at which point a majority of the larvae die. The few able to pupate at these high temperatures do not emerge as adults. The lowest temperature threshold for this species was found to be 12.5 °C below which females will not oviposit. The highest rate of development (with survival into adulthood) was seen at a constant temperature of 35 °C, where the average time of adult emergence was 265 hours (about 11 days). Flies at constant temperatures between 15 and 30 °C (at 5-degree increments) developed slower, with flies at the coolest temperatures taking the longest. Cyclic temperatures ranges of 25 to 35 °C and 15 to 25 °C proved to decrease the rate of development when compared to constant temperatures. (The cyclic temperature data were collected by placing specimens in an incubator which steadily alternated between the maximum and minimum temperatures of a particular 10-degree range (e.g. 25 to 35 °C). Each 10-degree fluctuation took place over a 12-hour span.)

Also, studies have been conducted to assess the effects of light exposure on developmental variability in larvae. Larvae exposed to cyclic photoperiods (shifting intermittently between 12 hours of light to 12 hours of darkness) have higher rates of development than larvae exposed to constant photoperiods (24 hours of light per day). These findings suggest that darkness may be a stimulus for larval growth. However, these variations in light photoperiods failed to influence pupal duration times.

=== Adult development ===
While this species is in the wild, dung constitutes a majority of the nutritional intake used for sexual development in both male and female adults, but diets with higher protein intake better facilitate mating ability of both sexes. Female sexual maturity requires the completion of 10 stages of follicle development in the ovaries to produce eggs that are completely mature, and ovaries in females which have been deprived of a high-protein diet do not develop fully. Although it is possible for females on a diet of only dung to reach the final stage of sexual maturity, it takes much more time than if they were to feed exclusively on beef liver; even then, a lower percentage of those feeding on dung will have fully developed. An experiment by Stoffolano demonstrated this, revealing that 100% of females feeding exclusively on beef liver were able to reach the final stage of sexual development after 13 days, while only 78% of females were able to do so when feeding exclusively on pig dung over a 20-day period. Although some Dipteran species oviposit on dung, P. regina females exclusively deposit their eggs on carrion.

The neuroendocrine system in adult males, which controls their mating behavior, must be stimulated before they will mate with a female. Protein in the male diet is not necessarily needed for this stimulation, but Stoffolano also saw that higher percentages of females were successfully inseminated by male specimens which had been fed either dung or beef liver versus specimens with a diet of only sugar. Protein is not generally necessary for spermatogenesis in male flies, but it is paramount for accessory reproductive gland development, higher rates of copulation, and the capability of impregnating females. An additional study found a positive correlation between male head size and the size of the aedeagi (the external reproductive organs), which has been proposed as a possible reason for lower percentages of insemination between small males and large females within this species.

== Food sources ==
Feeding habits vary greatly throughout the life cycle of P. regina. The feeding habits of adult flies depend both on sex and reproduction status of the fly. This is particularly important with respect to their protein intake, which literature suggests has an important role in sexual maturation and copulation ability in adult P. regina. Like most other flies, the black blow fly feeds via sponging. Though adults require various types of nutrients, in the wild they are typically able to procure all their nutrition from feces.

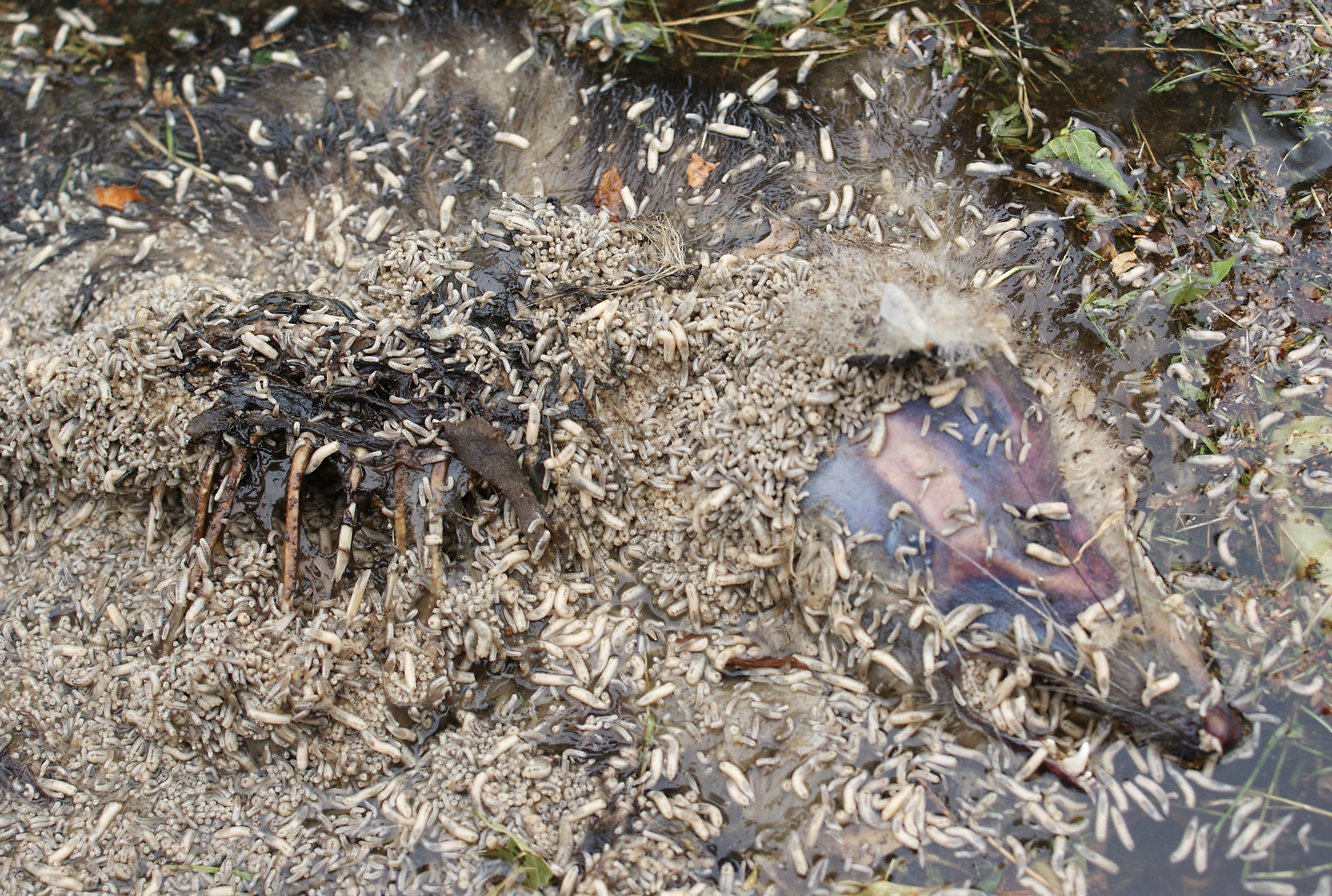
Decomposing possum

=== Larvae ===
Adult females oviposit eggs on carrion. These eggs hatch into larvae that feed on the decaying tissue.

=== Adult females ===
Virgin adult females, when given access to protein and carbohydrate sources, utilize both for food. However, after their emergence as adults, they will gradually increase their protein intake until they are approximately 8 to 10 days old. From here they will continue to intake protein at a relatively constant rate that is lower than their required carbohydrate intake. Once a female has mated, either for the first time or all subsequent times, a spike in protein intake occurs following oviposition of her eggs.

=== Adult males ===
Protein intake in adult male black blow flies follows similar trends to that of virgin adult females; however, they require less total protein than females. The males will gradually increase their protein intake for the first 8–10 days of adulthood. They will then drop their protein intake to a relatively low and constant amount.

== Mating ==
Adult black blow flies aggregate on feces, particularly animal dung pats, not only because they act as a food source, but also in order to mate. Some research has suggested a preference for settling on human, swine, and mink feces, but this may be localized to the northwestern region of the United States. P. regina is a panmictic species. Research supports mating success of adult males positively correlates to their size. Larger males have larger aedeagus which leads to more successful insemination of females. The mechanism of how and why larger aedeagus lead to better insemination is unknown.

=== Female reproductive system ===
Female black blow flies each have a pair of ovaries and lateral oviducts, one common oviduct, a vagina, and a bursa copulatrix, which is simply a sac-like cavity within the female that is roughly equivalent to a uterus. Each ovary has a lateral oviduct; these two lateral oviducts meet to form the common oviduct and connect the ovaries to the burs copulatrix. Three spermathecae are connected to the bursa copulatrix via spermathecal ducts, and two accessory glands attach to the bursa copulatrix near the spermathecae entries. The vagina is connected to the bursa copulatrix on the opposite end of the ovaries and allows the male aedeagus access to the bursa copulatrix and spermathecae.

=== Male reproductive system ===
Male black blow flies have an external phallus that is a tube-like structure with unique flaps centrally located. The phallus can be divided up into several different sections. There is the hypophallus, which protrudes from the abdomen of the fly. The cornua, which is the name given to the centrally located wing-like flaps on the phallus, protrude from the hypophallus. A pair of paraphallic bulbs are embedded in the cornua with only their tips jutting out. These bulbs are sclerotized, meaning they are hardened, as are a variety of spines on the outside of the cornua. From the cornua a narrower tube structure, the acrophallus, extends with a terminal fluted opening, referred to as the gonophore, from which sperm and accessory secretions flood.

=== Copulation ===
During mating the tip of the male's phallic structure is near the spermathecal ducts of the female's reproductive system. The wing-like flap structures on the male's phallus are situated in grooves within the bursa copulatrix of the female's reproductive system. The males also have appendages used to grasp and hold the female during copulation.

== Parental care ==
Similarly to other flies in the family Calliphoridae, P. regina exhibit little or no parental care. Females, however, oviposit their eggs after mating on carrion, leaving the eggs to hatch and develop on their own.

=== Oviposition ===
Mature P. regina females are known to oviposit their eggs on animal carcasses following copulation. Interestingly, it has been seen that the olfactory senses of female flies play some role in their decision of where and when to oviposit. Research suggests adult female P. regina will increase their ovipositing in the presence of a medium that provides odor stimuli to the fly.

== Social behavior ==
=== Maggot mass effect ===
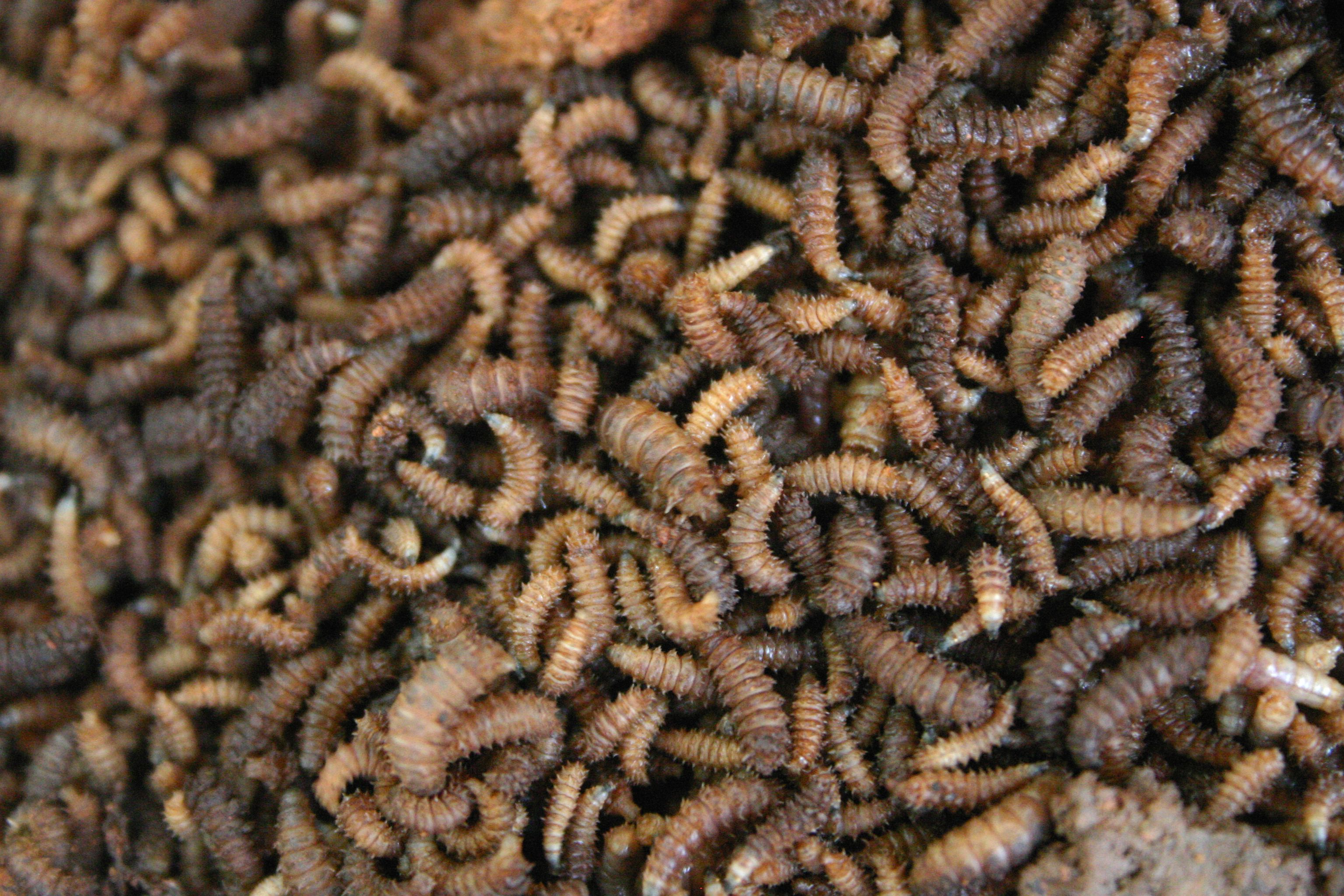
Fly and beetle larvae on the 5-day old carcass of a South African porcupine

Black blow fly larvae, like many other blow flies, exhibit the maggot mass effect: a raise in temperature due to the aggregation of maggots. This rise in temperature may be beneficial to the larvae by aiding in feeding and development as well as protection from dangerously cold temperatures, predators, and parasites. Studies with other blow flies suggest that the change in temperature seen in the maggot mass effect functions well at a wide range of temperatures and that the larvae do not reduce their heat production at higher temperatures.

== Genetics ==
The entire genome of P. regina has been sequenced so that it may serve as a reference genome that can be used in comparison with other Calliphoridae species. This fly has a chromosome number of 2n=12. The sex chromosomes of P. regina are a heteromorphic chromosome pair, meaning they have two morphologically distinct chromosomes that remain a homologous chromosome pair.

Picard and Wells used amplified fragment length polymorphisms (AFLP) to create genetic profiles of P. regina flies collected from different regions to compare both within region and across region relatedness. They discovered adult flies take from the same corpse showed high relatedness, but between regions genetic variability was high. They suggest these findings may be especially important to forensic entomology with respect to determining if a recovered body has moved locations by comparing AFLP data across individual P. regina.

== Physiology ==
Phormia regina, like other flies, is poikilothermic: the growth and development of the fly is dependent on temperature. At room temperature, the egg to pupal stage lasts about 6–11 hours. With an increase in temperature of the surrounding environment, metabolic rates of the blow fly typically increase, causing an increase in the rate of growth and development. However, this species is intolerant to warmer temperatures, unlikely to survive to adulthood at temperatures of 40 °C or greater. This observation provides an explanation as to why the species cannot survive the summer months in southern regions of the US. The adult organism's activity becomes inhibited by temperatures lower than 12.5 °C. In addition to an increase in the growth and development, temperature also has a profound impact on female oviposition. It is key to note the fluctuations between diurnal and nocturnal temperatures.

The larvae have posterior spiracles, small openings on the back used for the intake of oxygen. Larvae are also equipped with mouth hooks used for the physical breakdown of proteins when feeding, while proteolytic enzymes are used for chemical breakdown of these proteins.

== Interactions with humans ==
=== Myiasis ===
Phormia regina larvae have been shown to be an important organism in myiasis of both humans and animals, particularly in the southern region of the United States. Often in a myiatic infection where P. regina larvae are found, they are the only species involved; however, they had been found to be present in a wound with Cochliomyia hominivorax (formerly C. americana) as well.

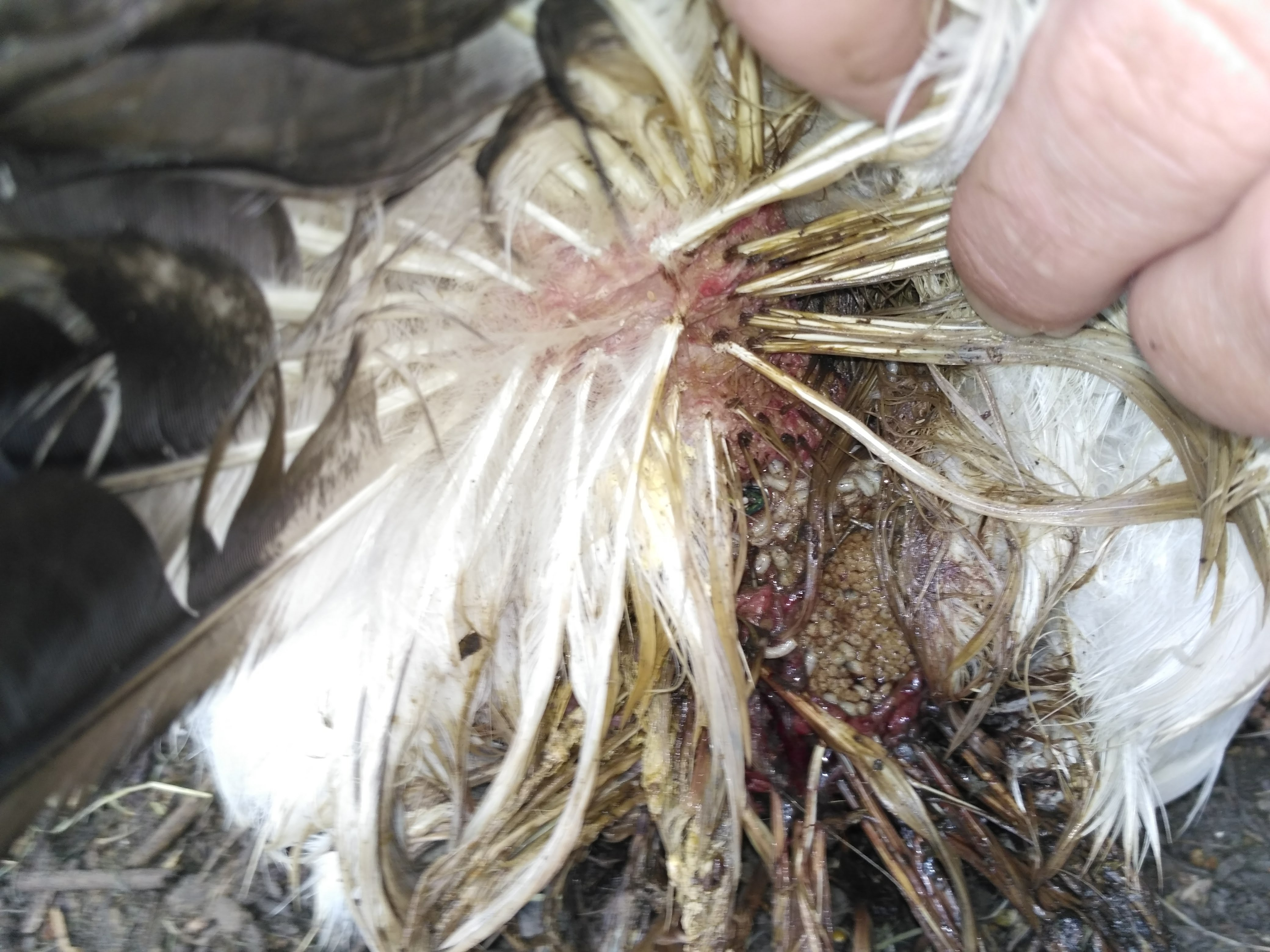
Severe myasis hen

=== Forensic importance ===
Phormia regina is a very important species in medico-criminal entomology, an area in forensic entomology which uses entomologists to aid with arthropod evidence in criminal investigations. This aspect of forensic science stresses using arthropod evidence in solving crimes, often of a violent nature, through two ideal approaches to estimate post mortem interval (PMI). The first approach accounts for the general succession of arthropod communities, and the second considers environmental influences on the development of arthropods. With knowledge of the regional insect fauna and times of carrion colonization, the insect gathering associated with the remains can be analyzed to determine a window of time in which death took place. PMI is a critical aspect of criminal investigations following recovery of a corpse. PMI relies on an entomologist's ability to correlate the species or stage of development of arthropods, in this case P. regina, to an approximation of the elapsed period between a person's death and the discovery of his/her body.

Blow flies are usually the first insects to colonize a body, frequently within minutes after death. P. regina adults and larvae are attracted to the body because, during decomposition, the remains go through rapid physical, biological, and chemical changes. If a corpse is found, the presence of Dipteran larvae may be used to suggest PMI by estimating the time it would have taken for eggs to have been deposited and larvae to have developed to the stage they were collected, while taking into account environmental factors. Blow flies will lay their eggs on the corpse, usually in a wound, if present, or in any of the natural orifices, and the maggot age can give a date of death accurate to a day or less, and is used in the first few weeks after death.

Research is being conducted to further perfect the dating of a PMI. One study suggests that P. regina occasionally oviposits on carrion at night only when certain conditions are met. A similar study found a combination of artificial lighting, warm temperatures, and the onset of low-pressure atmospheric conditions encourages nocturnal oviposition in P. regina Other studies suggest P. regina preferentially distribute their eggs during the day. Confirming the preference for daytime or nighttime oviposition in P. regina could aid in increasing the accuracy of PMI determination, and the disagreement necessitates more experimentation to investigate this environmental effect.

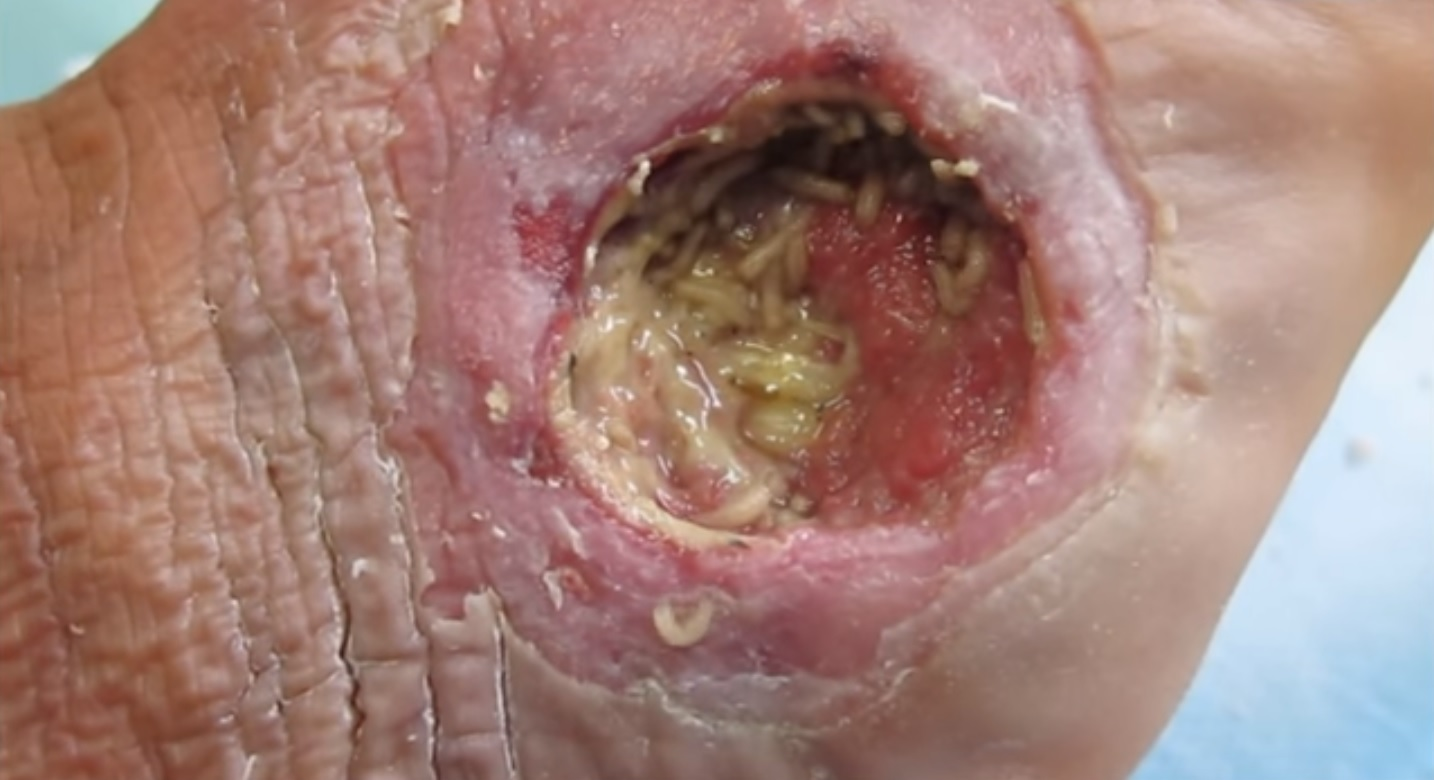
Maggot debridement therapy on a diabetic foot

=== Medical importance ===
Phormia regina is a flesh-eating fly not usually used for medical gain. However, the maggots from the black blow fly are used in maggot therapy, a type of biotherapy involving the intentional introduction of live, disinfected maggots into the skin and soft tissue wound of a human or animal for the purpose of selectively cleaning out only the necrotic tissue to promote healing.

=== Microbiome and pathogen carriage ===
Comparative analysis of wild-caught Phormia regina and Lucilia sericata across urban and rural habitats has shown that P. regina harbors a distinct, species-specific microbiome, independent of environmental or seasonal variation. This microbial community is consistently enriched with bacterial taxa such as Ignatzschineria and Dysgonomonas, some of which are recognized as opportunistic pathogens in clinical settings. These findings suggest that P. regina may act as a more consistent vector for certain bacteria relative to other blowfly species, with potential implications for disease transmission, forensic entomology, and wound colonization in medical contexts.
