= Trypocalliphora =

Scientific classification
- Domain: Eukaryota
- Kingdom: Animalia
- Phylum: Arthropoda
- Class: Insecta
- Order: Diptera
- Family: Calliphoridae
- Genus: Trypocalliphora; Peus, 1960

Genus of flies

Trypocalliphora is a genus of flies belonging to the family Calliphoridae.

The species of this genus are found in Europe and Northern America.

Species:

- Trypocalliphora braueri (Hendel, 1901)
