= Maggot =

Larva of a fly

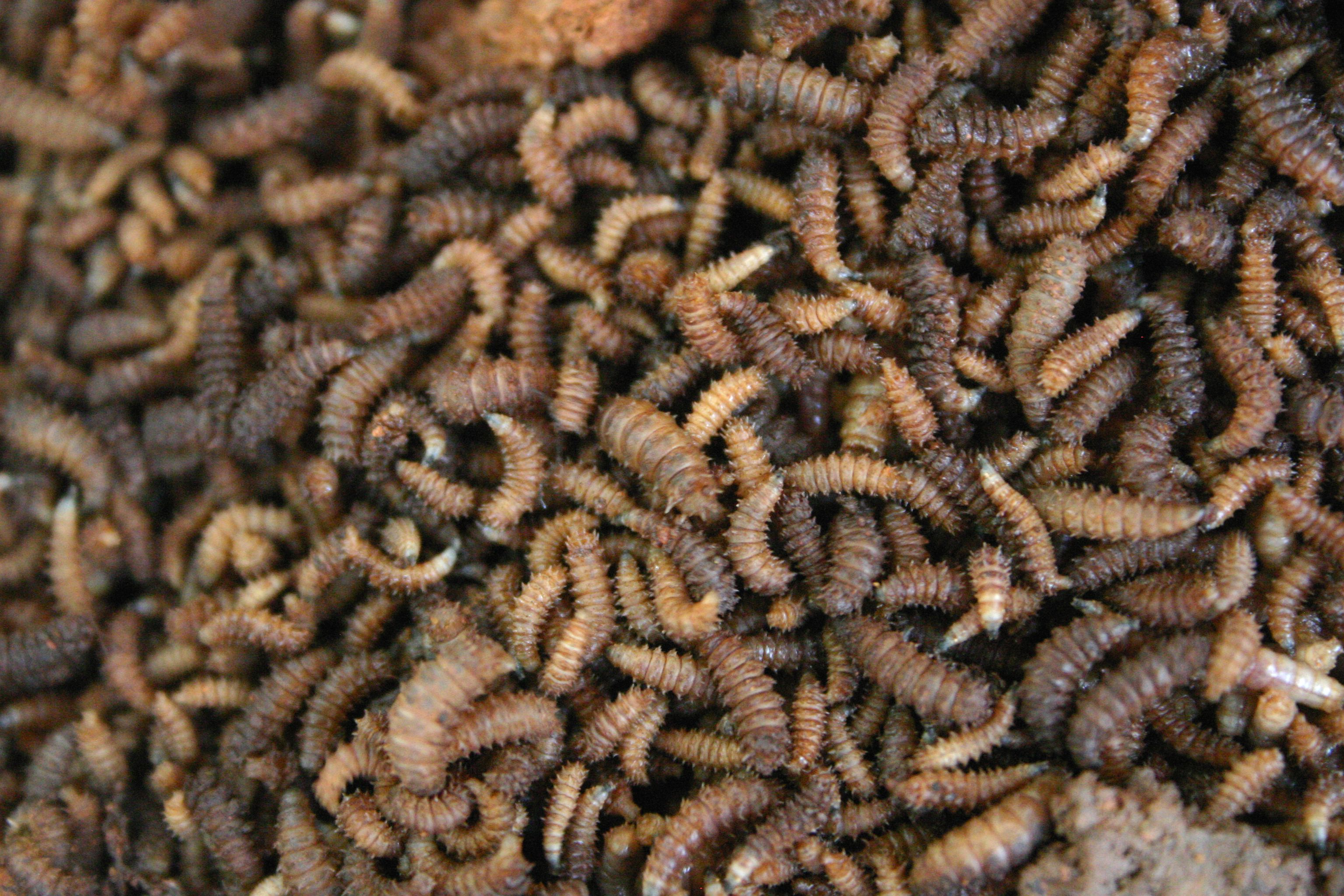
Maggots on a porcupine carcass

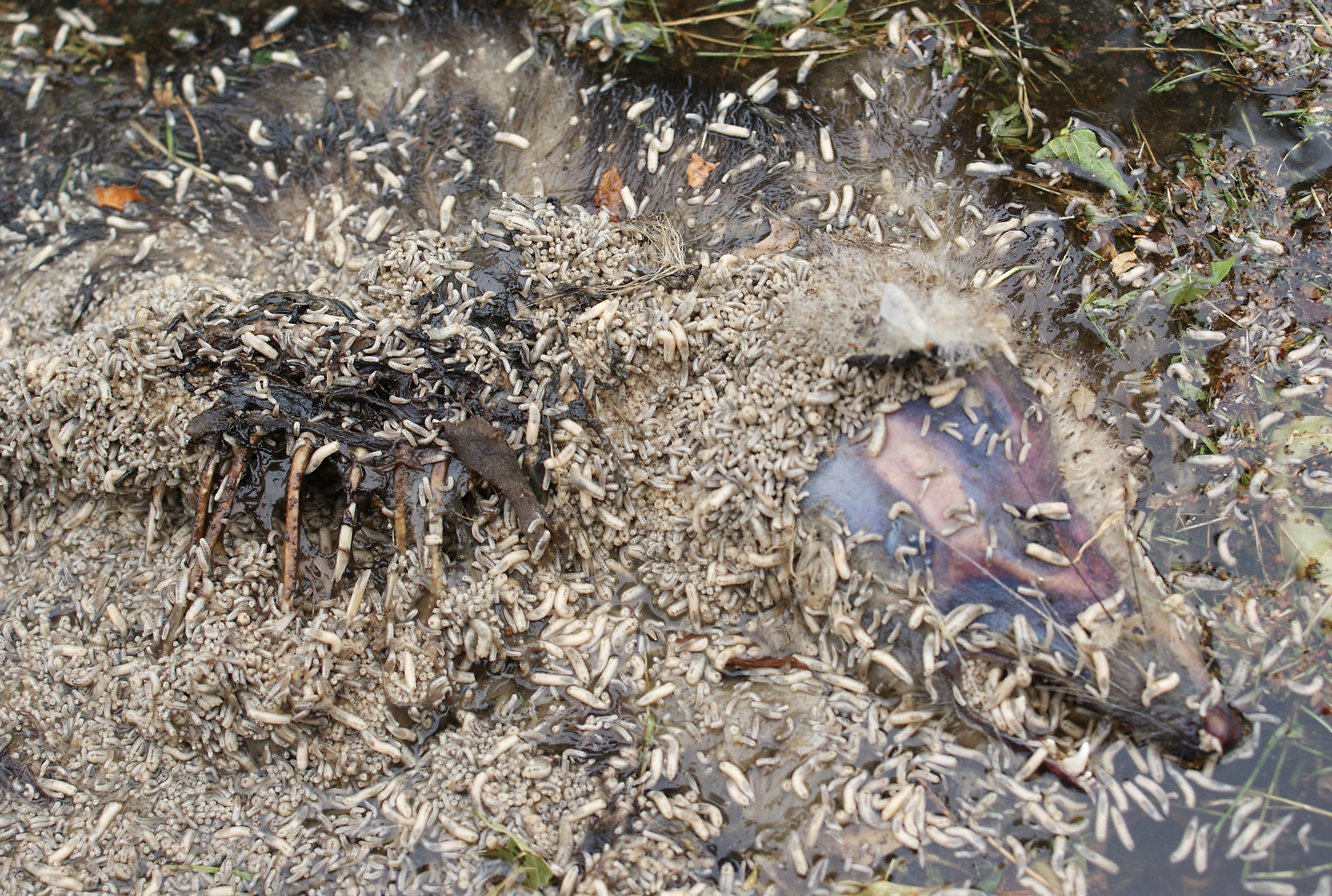
Maggots feeding on an opossum carrion

Common wild pig (boar) corpse decomposition timelapse. Maggots are visible.

A maggot is the larva of a fly (order Diptera); it is applied in particular to the larvae of Brachycera flies, such as houseflies, cheese flies, hoverflies, and blowflies, rather than larvae of the Nematocera, such as mosquitoes and crane flies.

== Etymology ==
"Maggot" is not a technical term and should not be taken as such; in many standard textbooks of entomology, it does not appear in the index at all. In many non-technical texts, the term is used for insect larvae in general. Other sources have coined their own definitions; for example: "The term applies to a grub when all trace of limbs has disappeared" and "Applied to the footless larvae of Diptera". Additionally, in Flies: The Natural History and Diversity of Diptera, the author claims maggots "are larvae of higher Brachycera (Cyclorrhapha)."

Maggot-like fly larvae are of significance in ecology and medicine; among other roles, various species are prominent in recycling carrion and garbage, attacking crops and foodstuffs, spreading microbial infections, and causing myiasis. Maggots are also particularly important in forensic entomology because their development can help determine the time of death, particularly maggots in the Calliphoridae family.

== Uses ==
=== Fishing ===
Anglers use maggots usually commercially supplied to catch non-predatory fish. Maggots are the most popular bait for anglers in Europe. Anglers throw handfuls into the "swim" they are targeting, attracting the fish to the area. The anglers then use the largest or most attractive maggots on the hook, hoping to be irresistible to the fish. Commercial maggot breeders from the UK sell their maggots to tackle dealers throughout the E.U. and North America.

Artificial maggots for fishing, either in natural or fluorescent colors, have been developed and are used for trout, panfish, or salmon species.

=== Medical treatment ===
Live maggots of certain species of flies have been used since antiquity for wound debridement. Larvae of calliphorid flies of the species Lucilia sericata are widely used. Not all species are safe and effective; use of the wrong species would invite pathological myiasis.

In controlled and sterile settings overseen by medical practitioners, maggot therapy introduces live, disinfected maggots into non-healing skin or soft wounds of a human or animal. They feed on the dead or necrotic tissue, leaving sound tissue largely unharmed. Studies have also shown that maggots kill bacteria. Three midgut lysozymes of L. sericata have antibacterial effects in maggot debridement therapy. The study demonstrated that the majority of gram-positive bacteria were destroyed in vivo within the particular section of the L. sericata midgut where lysozymes are produced. During the passage through the intestine of the maggots, the ability of bacteria to survive drastically decreased, implying the antibacterial action of the three midgut lysozymes. In 2005 maggot therapy was being used in about 1,300 medical centers.

Apprehension from healthcare workers has inhibited acceptance, but a supplier of maggots said in 2022 that she had noticed significantly more acceptance over the four years she had worked in the field. Acceptance among patients is high.

=== Forensic science ===
The presence and development of maggots on a corpse are useful in the estimation of time elapsed since death. Depending on the species and the conditions, maggots may be observed on a body within 24 hours. The eggs are laid directly on the food source, and when the eggs hatch, the maggots move towards their preferred conditions and begin to feed. By studying the insects present at a crime scene, forensic entomologists can determine the approximate time of death. Insects are usually useful after a post-mortem interval (PMI) of approximately 25–80 hours, depending on ambient conditions. After this interval, this method becomes less reliable. Blow flies are often used in forensic entomology to determine PMI because of their oviposition on carrion and corpses. The black blowfly, Phormia regina (P. regina), is extremely widespread across the US and often the earliest species to oviposit on a corpse, making it especially important to forensic science.

Maggots are useful as well in entomotoxicology, in determining the presence of drugs in a corpse's system. Maggots bioaccumulate xenobiotics (substances, drugs, metals, etc.) from tissue and bone, therefore allowing entomologists to determine if xenobiotics, most commonly drugs, were present in the body before death. This is useful in concluding a cause of death in many different cases including overdoses and poisonings. It also helps in determining manner of death including suicide or homicides. Maggots are able to bioaccumulate substances from fresh corpses, as well as fully decomposed skeletonized bodies. Data and resources on entomotoxicology are sparse as it is a relatively new field of study. The knowledge of how the drug or substance effects the development of maggots is necessary as some drugs such as cocaine and methamphetamine are proven to accelerate the development of larvae, whereas opiates are shown to decelerate said rate.

== Behaviours ==
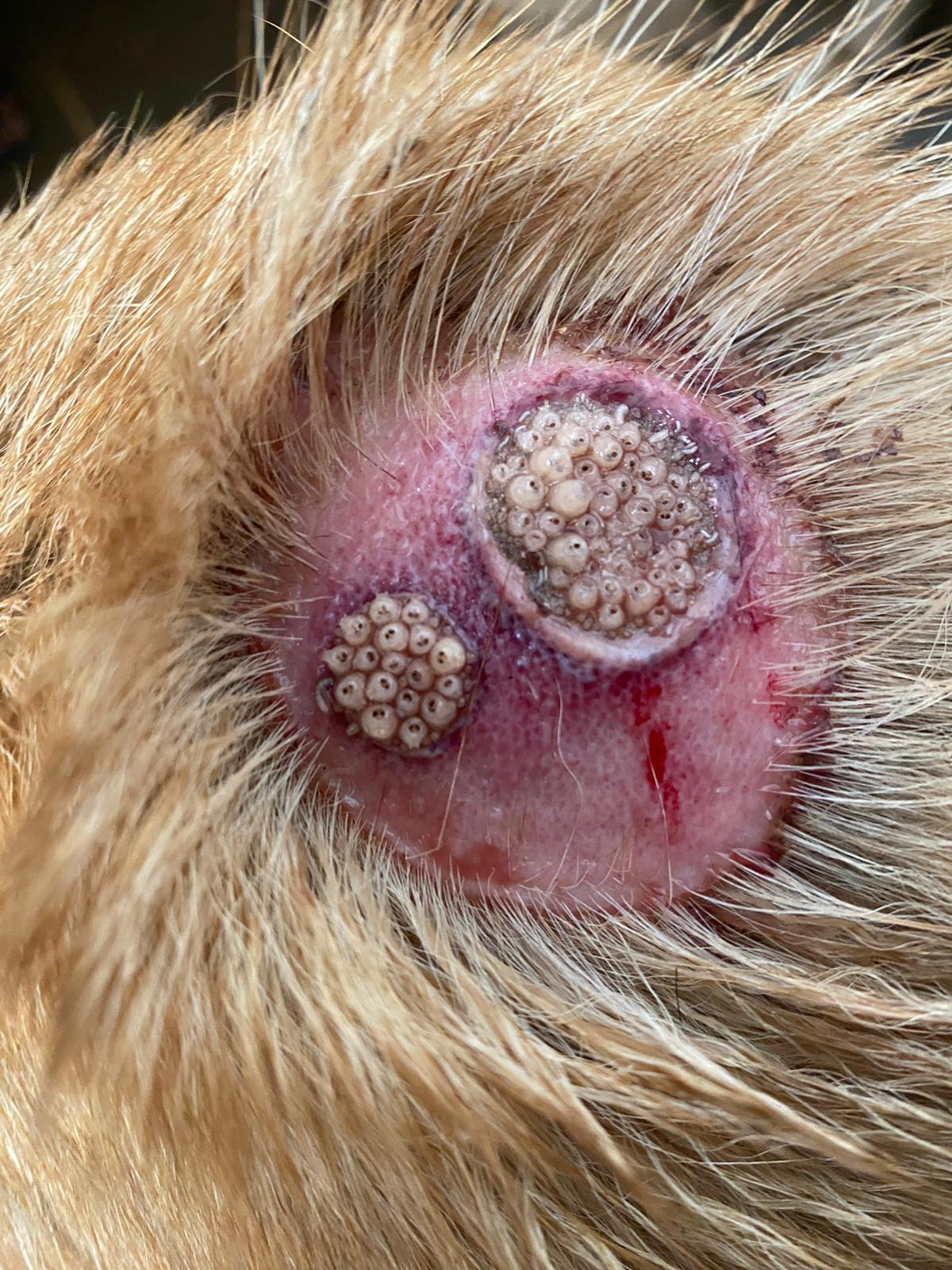
Myiasis in a dog's flesh

As with fleas and ticks, maggots can be a threat to household pets and livestock, especially sheep. Flies reproduce rapidly in the summer months, and maggots can come in large numbers, creating a maggot infestation and a high risk of myiasis (a maggot infestation of living tissue) in sheep and other animals. Humans are not immune to the feeding habits of maggots and can also contract myiasis. Interaction between humans and maggots usually occurs near garbage cans, dead animals, rotten food and other suitable egg-laying substrates for flies with detritivorous larvae.

Many of the families of flies with "maggot" larvae can reach very high population densities through exponential growth, but in natural conditions without human interference, predators, parasites, and food availability keep the population under control. Sealing garbage and using a garbage disposal or freezing rotting leftovers until waste collection day helps prevent infestation. Introducing an environmental control, such as hister beetles, can also help reduce maggot populations.

== See also ==
- Caterpillars
- Polychaete
- Worm
- Maggot farming
- Myiasis
