= Compsomyiops =

Scientific classification
- Kingdom: Animalia
- Phylum: Arthropoda
- Class: Insecta
- Order: Diptera
- Family: Calliphoridae
- Genus: Compsomyiops; Townsend, 1918

Species
- See text

Genus of flies

Compsomyiops is a genus of blowflies, in the family Calliphoridae.

== Species ==
The following species are accepted in the genus Compsomyiops:

- Compsomyiops alvarengai (Mello, 1968)
- Compsomyiops boliviana (Mello, 1968)
- Compsomyiops callipes (Bigot, 1877)
- Compsomyiops fulvicrura (Robineau-Desvoidy, 1830)
- Compsomyiops lyrcea (Walker, 1849)
- Compsomyiops melloi Dear, 1985
- Compsomyiops verena (Walker, 1849)
