= One Size Fits All (disambiguation) =

One size fits all is a marketing term indicating the utility of an article.

One Size Fits All may also refer to:

- One Size Fits All (Frank Zappa album), 1975 album by Frank Zappa and the Mothers of Invention
- One Size Fits All (Pink Cream 69 album), 1991 album by Pink Cream 69
- One Size Fits All, 1989 album by Ole Evenrud
