= Chrysomya villeneuvi =

Scientific classification
- Domain: Eukaryota
- Kingdom: Animalia
- Phylum: Arthropoda
- Class: Insecta
- Order: Diptera
- Family: Calliphoridae
- Genus: Chrysomya
- Species: C. villeneuvi

Binomial name
- Chrysomya villeneuvi Patton, 1922

Species of fly

Chrysomya villeneuvi, or hairy maggot, is a South East Asian fly species of forensic importance because the maggots of this species have been collected from human corpses.

Study of the feeding behaviour of the hairy maggot is also underway to establish if they can be of possible medical importance in the future.

Chrysomya villeneuvi belongs in the Dipteran family Calliphoridae. This family is composed of the blowflies, carrion flies and cluster flies. This genus includes Chrysomya bezziana and Chrysomya putoria, both of which are obligate parasites of mammals and cause myiasis.
