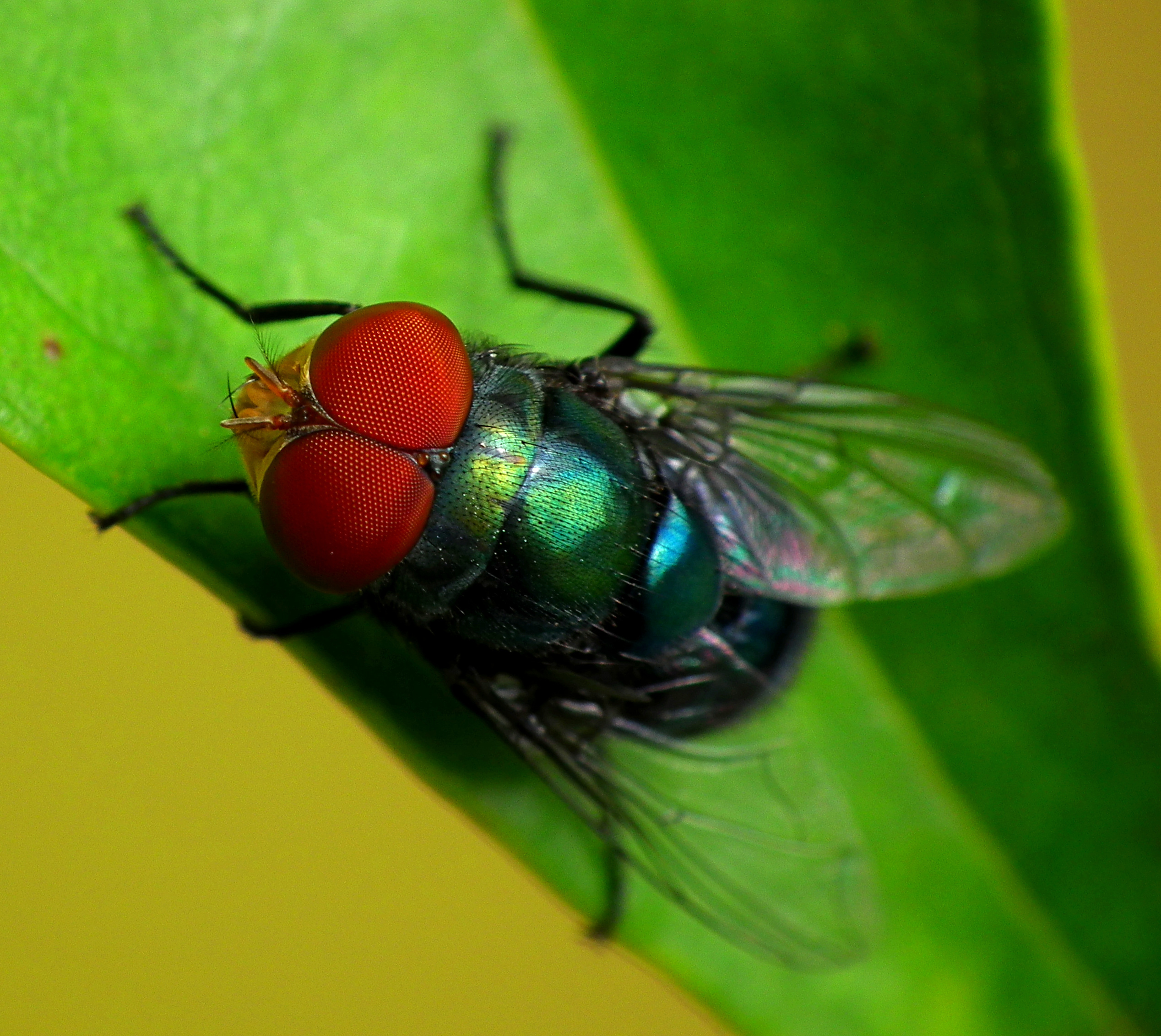
- Male Bluebottle Chrysomya rufifacies.

Scientific classification
- Kingdom: Animalia
- Phylum: Arthropoda
- Clade: Pancrustacea
- Class: Insecta
- Order: Diptera
- Family: Calliphoridae
- Genus: Chrysomya
- Species: C. rufifacies

Binomial name
- Chrysomya rufifacies (Macquart, 1842)

= Chrysomya rufifacies =

Species of fly

Chrysomya rufifacies is a species belonging to the blow fly family, Calliphoridae, and is most significant in the field of forensic entomology due to its use in establishing or altering post mortem intervals. The common name for the species is the hairy maggot blow fly, and it belongs to the genus Chrysomya, which is commonly referred to as the Old World screwworms. This genus includes other species such as Chrysomya putoria and Chrysomya bezziana, which are agents of myiasis. C. rufifacies prefers very warm weather and has a relatively short lifecycle. It is widely distributed geographically and prefers to colonize large carcasses over small ones. The species commonly has a greenish metallic appearance and is important medically, economically, and forensically.

== Taxonomy ==
Chrysomya rufifacies was first described by French entomologist Pierre-Justin-Marie Macquart. Its specific epithet is derived from the Latin words rufus "reddish" and facies "face". Some taxonomists believe C. rufifacies is conspecific with Chrysomya albiceps due to biological, ecological, distributional, and morphological similarities. The larvae of both species are very difficult to distinguish, and only a minor difference exists between the imagos. A prostigmatic bristle is said to be present in C. albiceps and absent in C. rufifacies, but it is not present in all C. albicepes or it is very reduced, so this characteristic is unreliable. The status of C. rufifacies is not completely clear, and its relation to C. albiceps has not been fully determined.

== Description ==
=== Adult ===
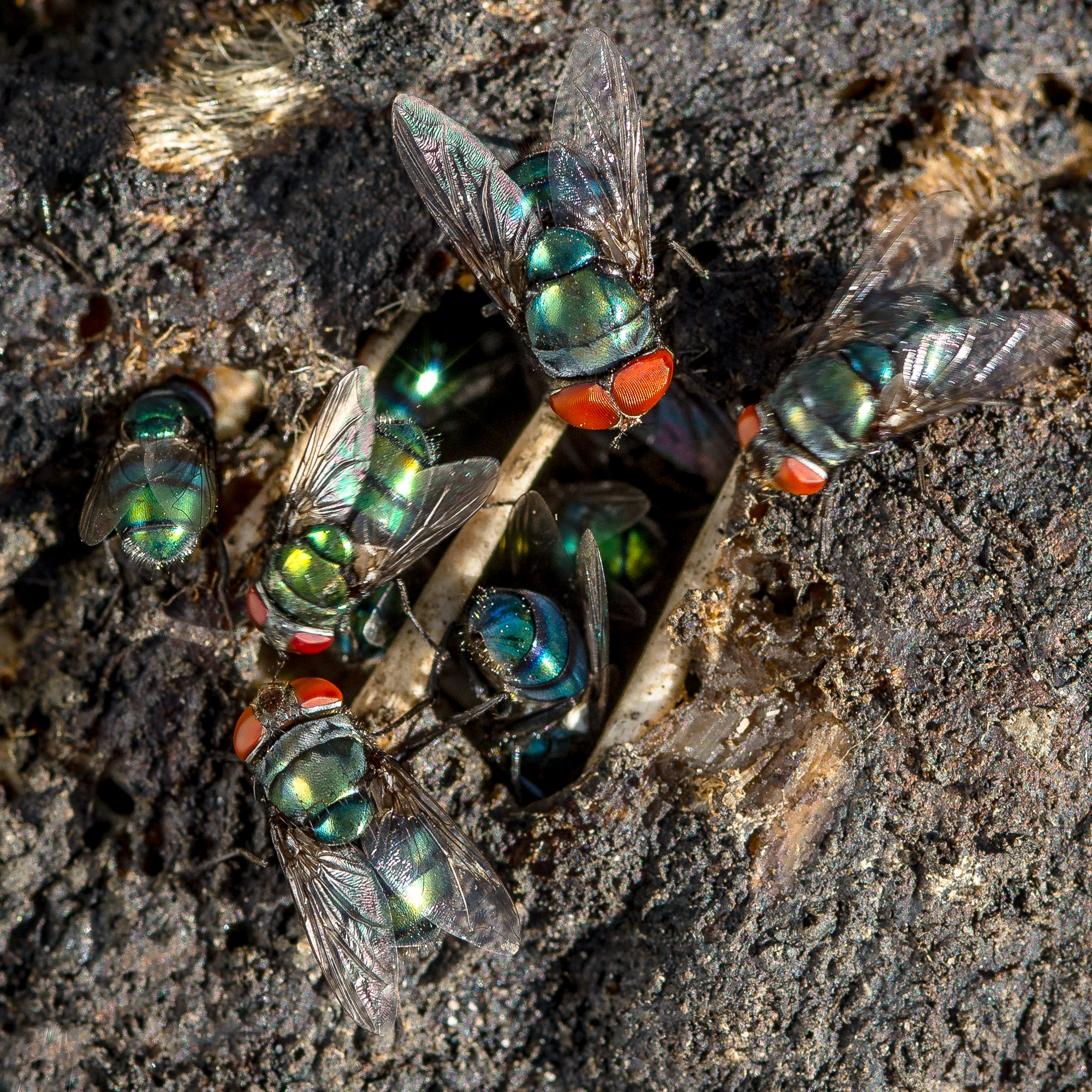
A C. rufifacies adult, the hairy maggot blow fly

The hairy maggot blow fly can be readily identified by examining for a shiny metallic blue-green color, a pale genal dilation, and a vestiture of the anterior thoracic spiracle that is pale in color. The mature adult is about 6–12 mm (0.24–0.47 in) in length.

The use of a microscope allows the investigator to identify setae on the fly's meron, a greater ampulla with stiff erect setae, black first and second abdominal tergites, and a black posterior margin of the third and fourth abdominal tergites. These features are characteristic of the genus Chrysomya. The differentiation between C. megacephala and C. rufifacies is accomplished by observing the anterior thoracic spiracle color. C. rufifacies has a pale or white anterior thoracic spiracle, while C. megacephala has a dark brown or dark orange anterior thoracic spiracle. Also, C. rufifacies contains three, faint pronotal thoracic stripes, which are not readily visible.

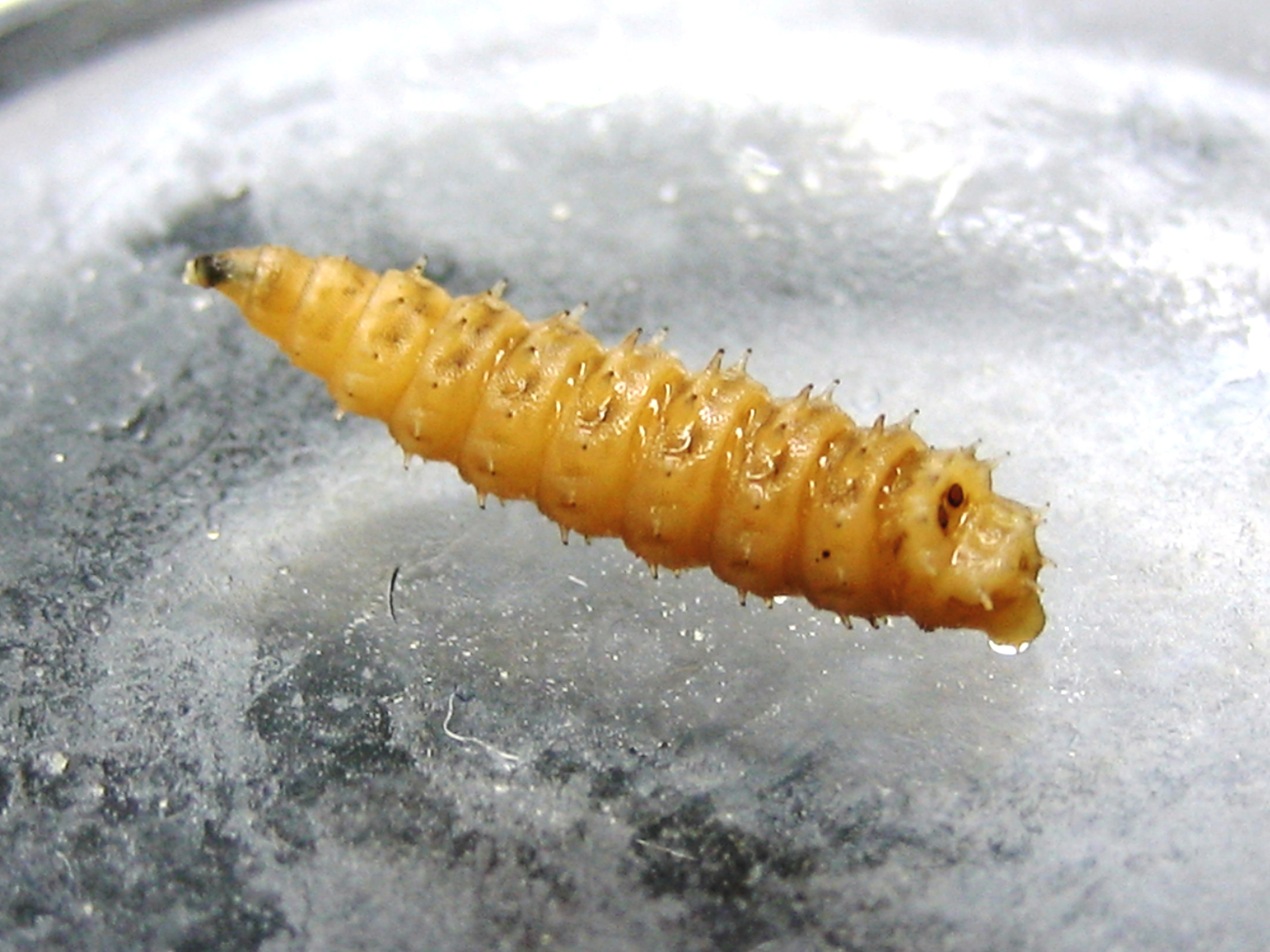
A C. rufifacies larva, the hairy maggot blow fly

=== Larvae ===
The larvae of C. rufifacies are very easily identified with sharp, fleshy tubercles running down their bodies, and the mature larva is about 14 mm (0.55 in) in length with a dirty yellowish color; hence the common name, hairy maggot blow fly. The peritreme of the posterior spiracle is very wide with a narrow gap that contains forked edges; the slits are short and wide, almost filling the plate.

== Lifecycle ==
Knowledge of the lifecycle of C. rufifacies is crucial in determining the post mortem interval for applications related to medicocriminal entomology. Accurate developmental and successional data for the species can significantly aid in legal investigations. C. rufifacies is especially important in these determinations due to its highly predictable developmental time and low degree of variation in larval development. The lifecycle of C. rufifacies is characterized by holometabolous development, consisting of egg, larva, pupa, and adult stages. The entire lifecycle takes 190 to 598 hours depending on temperature.

The female lays an average of 210 eggs and a recorded maximum of 368 eggs near fresh corpses and often during daylight hours. After the eggs have been laid, the first-instar larva of the insect emerges from the egg about 26 hours later at a temperature of 29 °C. Three larval instars are involved in the lifecycle of the species, and the entire larval development stage takes 2.5 days at 29 °C. The larvae are capable of regulating their body temperature by moving to a different position in the maggot mass to maintain a preferred developmental temperature. The maximal preferential temperature for the larvae of C. rufifacies is 35.1 °C. The developmental time of the species is highly dependent upon temperature due to the cold-blooded nature of insects and the number of accumulated degree days. Any variability in developmental times can also be due to different rearing temperatures under different conditions such as varying humidity, rearing media, and larval density.

A prepupal stage is often present and characterized by larval dispersion and migration away from the food source in search of a pupation site. The body length of the larva decreases during this stage in preparation for pupation. If the larvae are restricted from movement and not allowed to disperse during the prepupal stage, a 24-hour delay in pupation will be observed. Thus, in medicoforensic investigations, if a corpse is wrapped and causes restriction of maggot migration, altered developmental times should be considered. The prepupal stage takes 1.5 days and the pupal stage takes 3 days at 29 °C. Pupation usually occurs near the soil surface or near decaying flesh, and the skin of the larvae hardens to form a dark brown puparium or outer casing. Adults emerge after pupation and mate 3–7 days after emergence in summer, and 9–10 days after emergence in autumn. Adults are capable of living for 23–30 days, and oviposition occurs about 5 days after mating.

== Importance ==
=== Medical ===
Chrysomya rufifacies has been used successfully in maggot therapy to treat patients with osteomyelitis, a microbial infection of the bone. C. rufifacies can be a vector for enteric pathogens in countries such as India and Australia, specifically, if it enters homes due to its attraction to feces, fruits, meats, and refuse. Multiple pathogens such as Bacillus bacteria, roundworms, and pinworms have been recovered from the alimentary canal and feces of C. rufifacies. The late instars of the species are beneficial medically by acting as predators of maggots of pathogen-transmitting and myiasis-producing flies; thus, the larvae can be used as beneficial and effective biological control agents. However, certain strains from Australia, India, and Hawaii have been documented to have instars that are harmful when involved in secondary myiasis.

=== Economic ===
As a widely distributed species, C. rufifacies has a profound impact on both livestock and population of other dipteran species. It is beneficial to humans due to its facultatively predatory nature, in which it consumes maggots of other species, especially competitors on necrotic tissue. The species is known to control populations of Lucilia cuprina and Lucilia sericata, dipteran species that arrive first on a dead or rotten body. C. rufifacies can also behave cannibalistically when no other food source is present.

Although a report had been made in 1982 of a case in Hidalgo County, Texas, where myiasis had been discovered in a dog, C. rufifacies tends to primarily affect livestock. In many countries, especially Australia, C. rufifacies maggots are known to cause skin and underlying tissue damage of sheep; this processes is known as "sheep strike" and results in economic loss. Typically, economic damage inflicted by these maggots occurs as cutaneous myiasis on ovine livestock. Periodic oviposits on improperly cleaned newborn calves, as well as myiasis of mature cattle and sheep, have been reported in Texas and Arizona, where the fly has established resident populations. Animal myiasis caused by the species often produces large wounds that heal very slowly; however, this blow fly is not considered as a significant myiasis fly and is rarely involved in myiasis. Although the economic damage inflicted by the fly is unknown, estimates depend on the quality of livestock care and the size of the fly population.

=== Forensic ===
Chrysomya rufifacies is one of the most forensically important flies because of its extremely predictable developmental time, minimal larval length difference, and low regional variation. It has a pupal developmental time ranging from 134 hours to 162 hours. The adult begins to form during the 237th to the 289th hour. This is useful for the forensic entomologist in determining the time of death for a corpse. C. rufifacies could have an impact in distorting post mortem intervals by eliminating primary maggots on a corpse, due to its facultatively predatory nature during the second- and third-instar larval stages. The facultatively predatory instars feed on other dipteran larvae as alternative food sources, especially in conditions where limited food supplies exist. Even undernourished larvae can successfully pupate and become healthy adults. Further altering of the post mortem interval can occur due to cannibalism, which occurs when the second-instar larvae consume the first-instar larvae.

In the southeastern, central, and southwestern part of the United States, the adult C. rufifacies is one of the first insects to arrive on a fresh corpse. The adults normally arrive within the first 10 minutes after death. The larvae also have a shorter developmental time than other species, but because of their predatory nature, they can also alter entomological-based post mortem interval estimation. In Texas and Florida, the species emerges from corpses that are in an advanced stage of decomposition.

== Distribution ==
Chrysomya rufifacies can be found in a wide variety of human habitats. The fly is native to Australia and has been recently expanding greatly in distribution. Its wide distribution is due to natural dispersal and transportation through airplanes, boats, or automobiles. It occupies an altitudinal range from sea level to 1,250 m, 1,400 m, or 2,100 m. The first appearance of the species in the continental United States occurred in the 1980s. The species is now established in Southern California, Arizona, Texas, Louisiana, and Florida. It is expected to eventually occupy most of the United States in the near future. Due to rapid dispersion of the species, it has become the dominant blow fly on human cadavers in north and central Florida, while C. megacephala continues to be dominant in southern Florida.

== Future research ==
Chrysomya rufifacies is of primary forensic importance in the field of medicocriminal entomology and aids in establishing post mortem intervals. The species will become more significant ecologically, medically, and forensically as it displaces other native species and becomes a dominant blow fly. Future research is directed toward examining the potential effects of the widespread distribution of this species. C. rufifacies competes with the native Cochliomyia macellaria species and may cause the latter to become extinct. The fly has been successful in competing with other species in many regions of the world. This newly achieved success will require close monitoring of the species to examine its ecological effects and determine any serious involvement in myiasis. Further research in the developmental and successional behavior of the species will allow for more accurate post mortem interval calculations in the field of medicocriminal entomology.
