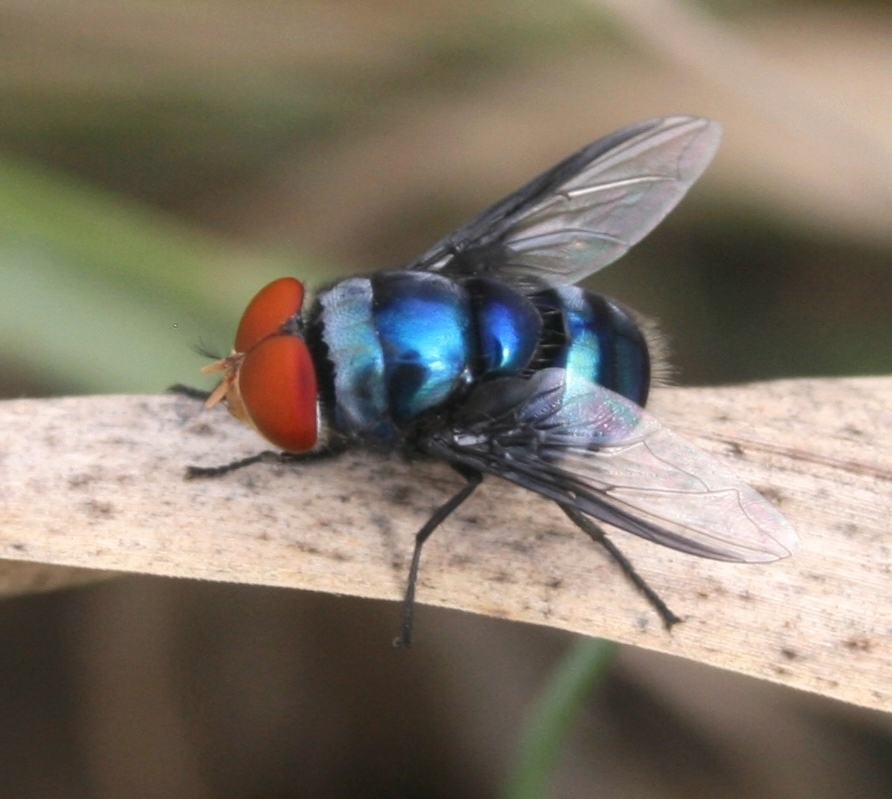

Scientific classification
- Kingdom: Animalia
- Phylum: Arthropoda
- Class: Insecta
- Order: Diptera
- Family: Calliphoridae
- Genus: Chrysomya
- Species: C. marginalis

Binomial name
- Chrysomya marginalis (Wiedemann, 1830)

Synonyms
- Musca marginalis Wiedemann, 1830; Chrysomya regalis (Robineau-Desvoidy, 1830)

= Chrysomya marginalis =

Species of fly

Chrysomya marginalis, the regal blowfly, also referred to as the regal bluebottle or the bordered blowfly is an uncommon and relatively large species of fly that was described by Weidemann in 1830. It is found in Africa to the south of the Sahara, and is also found in various Middle-Eastern countries.

== Description ==
The regal blowfly is a large fly, whose body reaches a length of 18 mm. The body of the fly is cylindrical in shape and robust indeed. It is highly iridescent, reflecting light in a rich blue, a greenish-cyan, or a blueish-violet depending on the angle of which the creature is observed. The abdomen is divided into a few segments, marked with darkened bands with relative thickness. It is short and compacted, almost cubic and geometrical. The thorax of the fly is shield-like and broad, split into three distinctive segments, and like the abdomen highlighted with darkened bands to mark said segments. The head of the fly is pale yellow bearing large, red, and faceted compound eyes. The male’s compound eyes are holoptic. Three ocelli are arranged in a triangular formation atop the fly’s head. Perhaps the most remarkable feature of the fly is its pair of wings. They are windowlike and hyaline, and possessing a darkened anterior wing margin which is the main defining feature used to identify the species, as it has been often confused with a similar species, Chrysomya megacephala.
