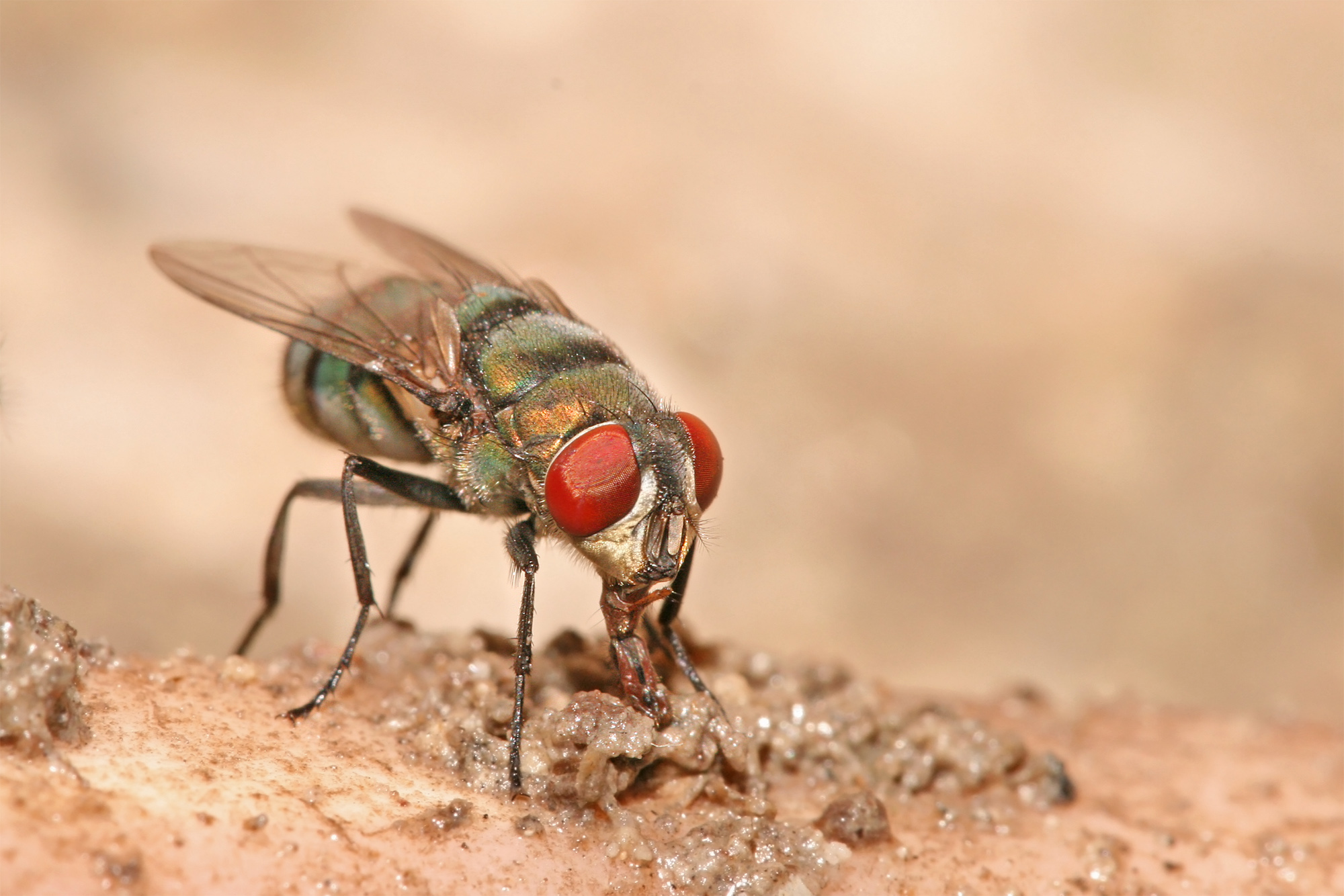
- Chrysomya albiceps feeding on rotting meat

Scientific classification
- Kingdom: Animalia
- Phylum: Arthropoda
- Class: Insecta
- Order: Diptera
- Family: Calliphoridae
- Genus: Chrysomya
- Species: C. albiceps

Binomial name
- Chrysomya albiceps (Wiedemann, 1819)

Synonyms
- Chrysomyia indica Patton, 1934; Compsomyia flaviceps Seguy, 1927; Compsomyia mascarenhasi Seguy, 1927; Paracompsomyia verticalis Adams, 1905; Somomyia annulata Brauer, 1899; Somomyia arussica Corti, 1895; Somomyia nubiana Bigot, 1877; Musca felix Walker, 1853; Lucilia arcuata Macquart, 1851; Lucilia testaceifacies Macquart, 1851; Musca emoda Walker, 1849; Musca elara Walker, 1849; Musca himella Walker, 1849; Musca bibula Wiedemann, 1830

= Chrysomya albiceps =

Species of fly

Chrysomya albiceps is a species belonging to the blow fly family, Calliphoridae.

== Taxonomy ==
Chrysomya albiceps is considered conspecific with Chrysomya rufifacies by some authorities. The two species have a similar biology and the morphological differences are slight (prostigmatic bristle present in C. albiceps absent in C. rufifacies (but not all rufifacies so this character is unreliable)).There are minor differences in larval morphology. The taxonomy of C. rufifacies is therefore not completely clear, and its relation to C. albiceps has not been fully determined.

== Distribution ==
This species was originally spread in the African continent, southern Europe and Asia. From the seventies it began to spread also in neo-tropical regions such as Colombia, Argentina, Peru and Paraguay.

It is a very common species in the Mediterranean regions, and it is present in Egypt, Iran, Iraq, Kuwait, Lebanon, Libya, Oman, Pakistan, Kingdom of Saudi Arabia, Syria, United Arab Emirates and Turkey.

== Habitat ==
C. albiceps is a subtropical to temperate species. It is present at altitudes of 200–1,000 metres (660–3,280 ft), but it is more abundant at an elevation of 1,000–3,100 metres (3,300–10,200 ft) above sea level.

== Description ==
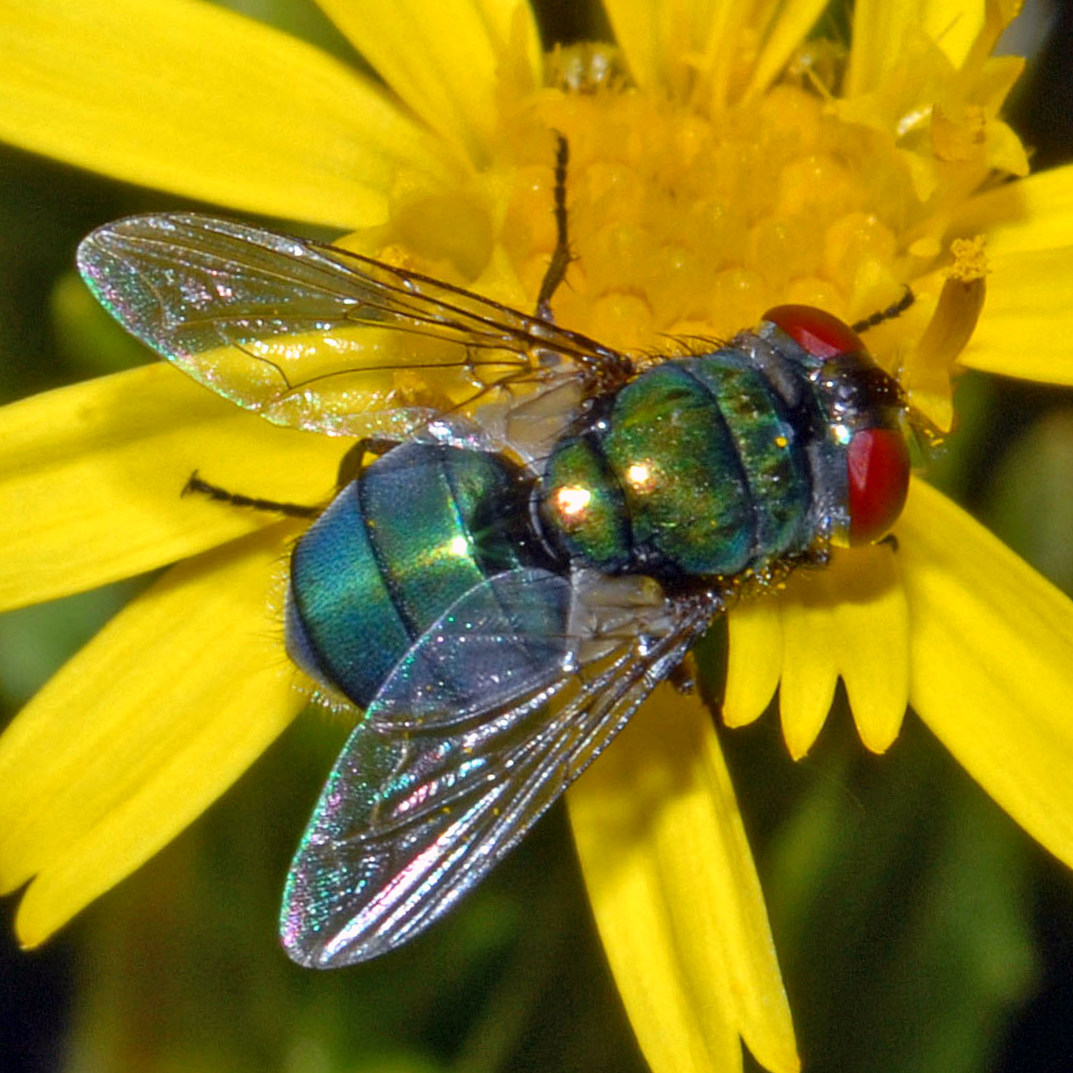
Chrysomya albiceps feeding on a flower of Dittrichia viscosa

Chrysomya albiceps can reach a length of 6–9 millimetres (0.24–0.35 in). In these blow flies, thorax and abdomen are metallic blue to green. Wings are completely hyaline. Thorax bears a row of thick bristles on the meron and greater ampulla and the head shows plumose arista. The third antennal segment is dark-grayish. In males frons of the head is very narrow and the eyes are very close to each other. Frons of females have a dark brown to black color.

== Biology ==
Adults feed on many things including decaying matter, excreta, and flowers. This insect normally reproduces within carcasses of dead animals, leaving eggs inside, usually together eggs of other species. Thus, although the first larvae feed on nutrients of decomposing tissues, the second and third series of larvae become predators, feeding on larvae of different species and even practicing cannibalism. Although eggs are normally deposited in decomposing tissues, they may, however, also be found in wounds of living tissues, both in animals and in humans. The ideal heat range for egg laying is 25 to 27 °C. The duration of the larval stage may differ as a result of temperature.

This species plays also a significant role as a voracious predator of other dipteran larvae during the maggot stage.

At temperatures between 20 and 30 °C the life cycle of Chrysomya albiceps from egg to adult lasts about 66 days.

== Human relevance ==
Chrysomya albiceps is of great medical and sanitary importance, being associated with myiasis in Africa and America. It is also of importance in forensic science and forensic entomology because it is the first insect to come in contact with carrion due to their ability to smell dead animal matter from up to ten miles (16 km) away. C. albiceps belongs to the same genus as the other myiasis-causing flies Chrysomya bezziana and Chrysomya putoria.

== Bibliography ==
- Erzinclioglu, Y. Z., The larvae of some blow flies of medical and veterinary importance, in Med. Vet. Entomol. 1987; 1: 121–125.
- Faria, D.B.L., Orsi, L., Trinca, L.A. et al., The larval predation by Chrysomya albiceps on Cocliomyia macellaria, Chrysomya megacephala and Chrysomya putoria, in Entomol. Exp. Appl. 1999; 149–155.
- M. E. Fueller, The insect inhabitants of carrion: a study in animal ecology, in Bulletin Council of Science and Industry Research in Australia 1932; 82 (1): 1-62.
- F. W. Hope, On insects and their larvae occasionally found in the human body, in R. Entomol. Soc. London 1840; 2: 256–271.
- Baumgartner D.L., Review of Chrysomya rufifacies (Diptera: Calliphoridae), in J. Med. Entomol. 1993; 30:338-352.
