= MedMagLabs =

Australian maggot therapy company

- Industry: Healthcare
- Headquarters: Australia
- Key people: Frank Stadler (Team Leader)
- Website: www.medmaglabs.com

MedMagLabs is an Australian company that creates wound-care treatment systems for people in humanitarian emergencies using maggot therapy.

== History ==
MedMagLabs was founded in 2019 at Griffith University where it was awarded government funding to create its first laboratory.

== Products ==
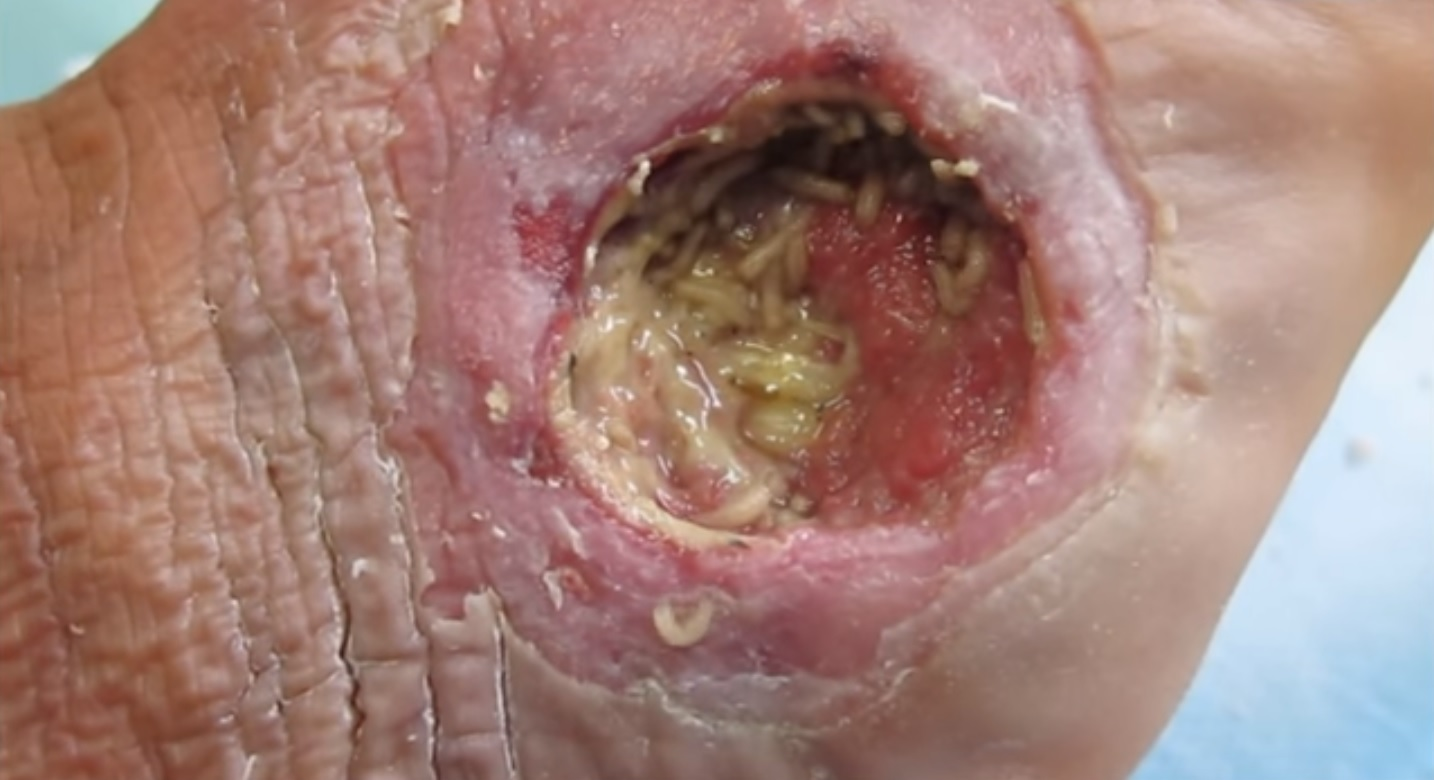
Maggot therapy, wound debridement of a diabetic ulcer

MedMagLabs builds medical maggot laboratories inside shipping containers; their "do it yourself" designs are freely available online for anyone to replicate. The laboratories are designed to be operated by non-healthcare professionals, in countries with weak healthcare systems, specifically countries experiencing armed conflict.

== People ==
MedMagLabs is led by Frank Stadler.
