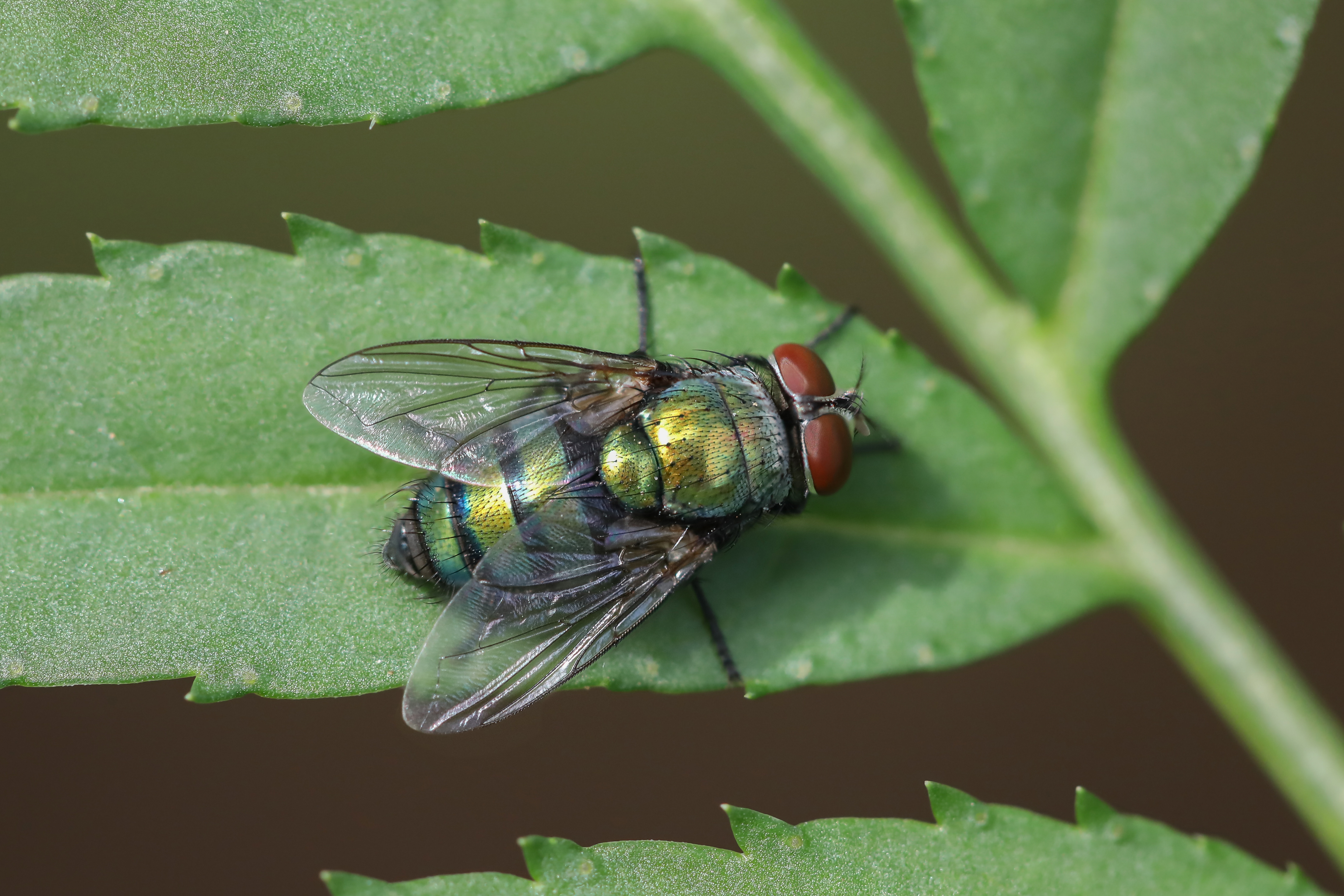
- Member of genus Chrysomya (Old World blow fly) on a leaf

Scientific classification
- Kingdom: Animalia
- Phylum: Arthropoda
- Clade: Pancrustacea
- Class: Insecta
- Order: Diptera
- Family: Calliphoridae
- Genus: Chrysomya
- Species: C. putoria

Binomial name
- Chrysomya putoria (Wiedemann, 1830)

= Chrysomya putoria =

Species of fly

Chrysomya putoria, also known as the tropical African latrine blowfly, is a fly species belonging to the blowfly family, Calliphoridae. C. putoria is native to Africa and has recently spread to the Americas. These flies pose significant health risks, especially due to their close association with human settlements. Adult flies can carry pathogens, while larvae may cause myiasis by growing and feeding on the flesh of domestic animals and humans. Other myiasis-causing flies in the same genus are C. bezziana and C. megacephala. C. putoria and other flies that feed on decomposing tissue are used as important tools in forensic entomology to establish the post-mortem interval, or the time elapsed since death.

== Description ==
The adult body is 8–10 mm (0.31–0.39 in) long, slightly larger than the average housefly, and metallic green, with an occasional tinge of metallic dark blue or bronze. The face of C. putoria is generally dark in color. Their wings are translucent, and the posterior edge of the abdomen is striped with black bands. While both sexes have black frons, the female has a much broader frons located between its widely-spaced eyes. This species has easily visible dusting on the upper side of its thorax, allowing it to be distinguished from many other closely related Calliphoridae species.

== Habitat and distribution ==
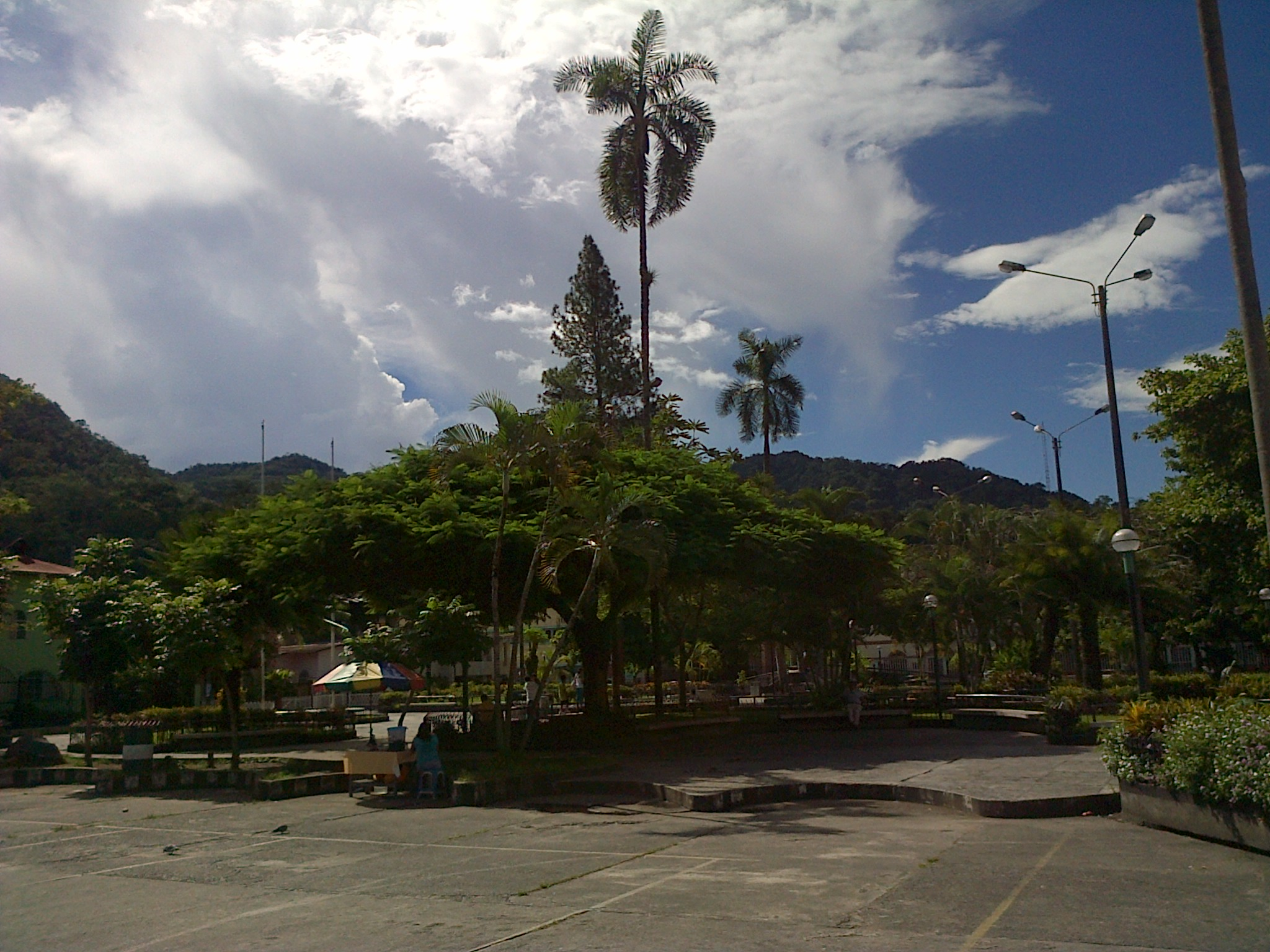
San Ramón, Peru, where populations of C. putoria have been studied

C. putoria originates from the tropics of the Old World, specifically Africa. The fly is widely distributed across the central and southern regions of the African continent, and found in countries including Zambia, Ethiopia, and Madagascar. Within the past few decades, several Chrysomya species, including C. putoria, invaded South America. These flies may have been initially introduced into Brazil from Africa in the 1970s before spreading across the rest of the continent. This dispersal may be connected to human mobility through the use of transportation like airplanes and ships. C. putoria is now found in many South American countries, including Argentina, Brazil, Colombia, Paraguay, and Peru. This spread of wild fly species may have also been facilitated by the fly's strong flying skills and synanthropy, known as the ability to benefit by closely associating with human habitats. As a tropical species, C. putoria prefers to inhabit warmer climates. In its native Old World habitat, this fly is generally found in areas with a temperature above 26.7 °C.

== Taxonomy ==
Members of the family Calliphoridae lay larvae in the tissue and feces of warm-blooded animals, such as in pit latrines.

The African blowfly C. chloropyga is the sister species of C. putoria and also breeds on feces and decaying flesh. Due to morphological similarities, these flies were previously considered to be subspecies. Phylogenetic analysis of cytochrome c oxidase gene sequences indicates that the two species diverged just a few thousand years ago.

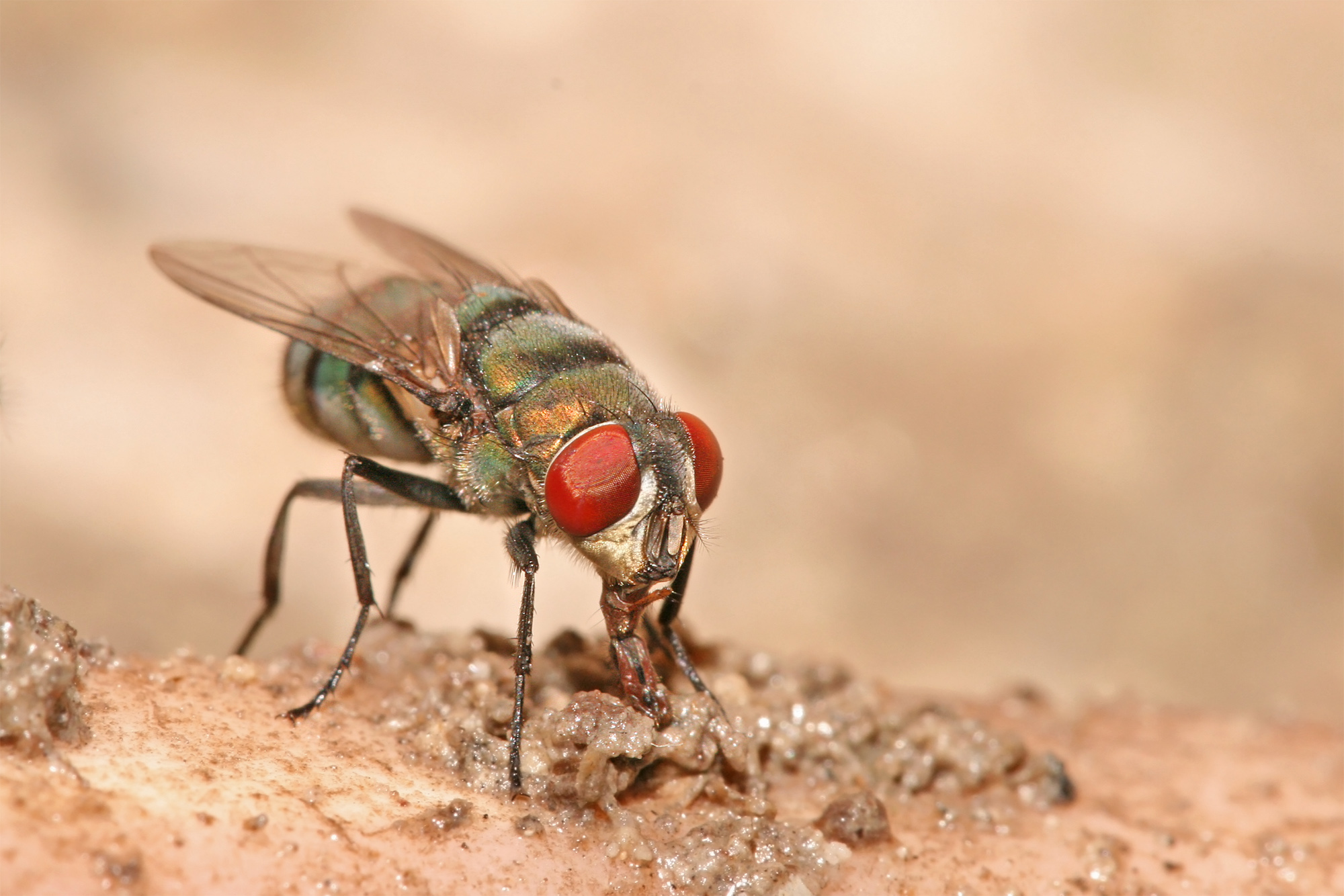
Chrysomya albiceps, another member of genus Chrysomya

C. albiceps and C. putoria both spread to the Peruvian Andes by 1980. While they broadly overlap at the elevation of 1,000 m (3,300 ft), their distributions indicate differential temperature preferences. C. putoria prefers inhabiting warmer, tropical areas below 1,000 m (3,300 ft), while C. albiceps can typically be found in temperate areas between 1,000 and 3,100 m (3,300 and 10,200 ft).

== Life history ==
=== Egg ===
C. putoria eggs are approximately 1.5 mm (0.06 in) long, rod-shaped, and cream-white in color.

=== Larva ===
C. putoria undergoes three larval instar stages. After hatching from the egg, the larva in the first instar is 3–4 mm (0.12–0.16 in) long with 11 spine bands aligned along its 12 separate body segments. In addition, a pair of spiracles can be seen on its most posterior segment with a singular spiracular opening. During the second instar, the larva remains cream-white in color and grows to 6–10 mm (0.24–0.39 in) in length. It develops fleshy folds and a pair of spiracles along its 2nd segment. The posterior spiracles now present two spiracular openings. The maxillary palp and antennae are also more developed. In the final instar stage, the larva reaches a length of 13 mm (0.51 in) and develops larger fleshy folds. The posterior spiracles are then fully developed with three spiracular openings. The spine on the anal segment has a bell-shaped appearance.

=== Pupa ===
The pupal stage lasts approximately 5 days. Early on, the malleable outer layer of the final instar becomes brittle and hard. The surface of the pupa is rough, bumpy, and unreflective. At the same time, the translucent cuticle gains creamy-white pigmentation. The body transforms on the second day, taking on yellow pigmentation and increasing the size of the head and wings. On the third day, the eyes turn orange and the body pigmentation shows a reddish tinge with a black stripe across the abdomen. On the fourth day, three black stripes appear across the abdomen, the wings, the legs become black, and the eyes and body darken into a brown color. On the fifth and final day, the body turns black, and the fly ecloses by breaking through the pupal casing.

=== Adult ===
The adult female has approximately 80 ovarioles in each of her two ovaries. She also has a pair of tubular sexual accessory glands that lead into the common oviduct. In addition, the female has three spherical spermathecae that store sperm from males after mating.

== Food resources ==
Adult C. putoria females lay eggs on feces, decaying flesh, and rotting food matter. As a result, the larvae feed and grow on these substrates.

If there is a scarcity of resources, C. putoria larvae may cannibalize one another after 24 hours. In addition, injured larvae leak hemolymph, which may induce cannibalistic tendencies in other larvae.

== Social behavior ==
Similar to other blowfly species, C. putoria exhibit larval gregariousness. The aggregation of larvae in isolated, temporal patches of food demonstrates intraspecific and interspecific competition.

== Predators and pathogens ==
Podisus nigrispinus, a species of stinkbug, is a predator of C. putoria larvae. The larvae of C. albiceps, another member of the blowfly family, are facultative predators of C. putoria larvae and the larvae of other fly species. C. albiceps larvae will surround then fatally pierce the target.

C. putoria are affected by pathogenic fungi Metarhizium anisopliae and Beauveria bassiana that act as parasitoids and can eventually kill.

== Genetics ==
The diploid chromosome number is 2n = 12, and all the chromosomal pairs are metacentric. Their count consists of 5 autosomal pairs and a sex chromosomal pair with an XY sex-determination system. Karyotype analysis indicates that the pericentromeric region of the autosomal chromosomes includes a C band, while the 3rd pair of chromosomes additionally includes an interstitial band.

== Physiology ==
Studies on the effect of temperature changes on the development of these flies found that the optimal temperature for egg survivability is between 20 and 30 °C (68 and 86 °F), consistent with the flies' preference for tropical climates. C. putoria has a developmental threshold of ~13.42 °C (56.16 °F), which is relatively higher than C. chloropyga's threshold of ~10.91 °C (51.64 °F), supporting their differential adaptations to temperature.

== Interactions with humans ==
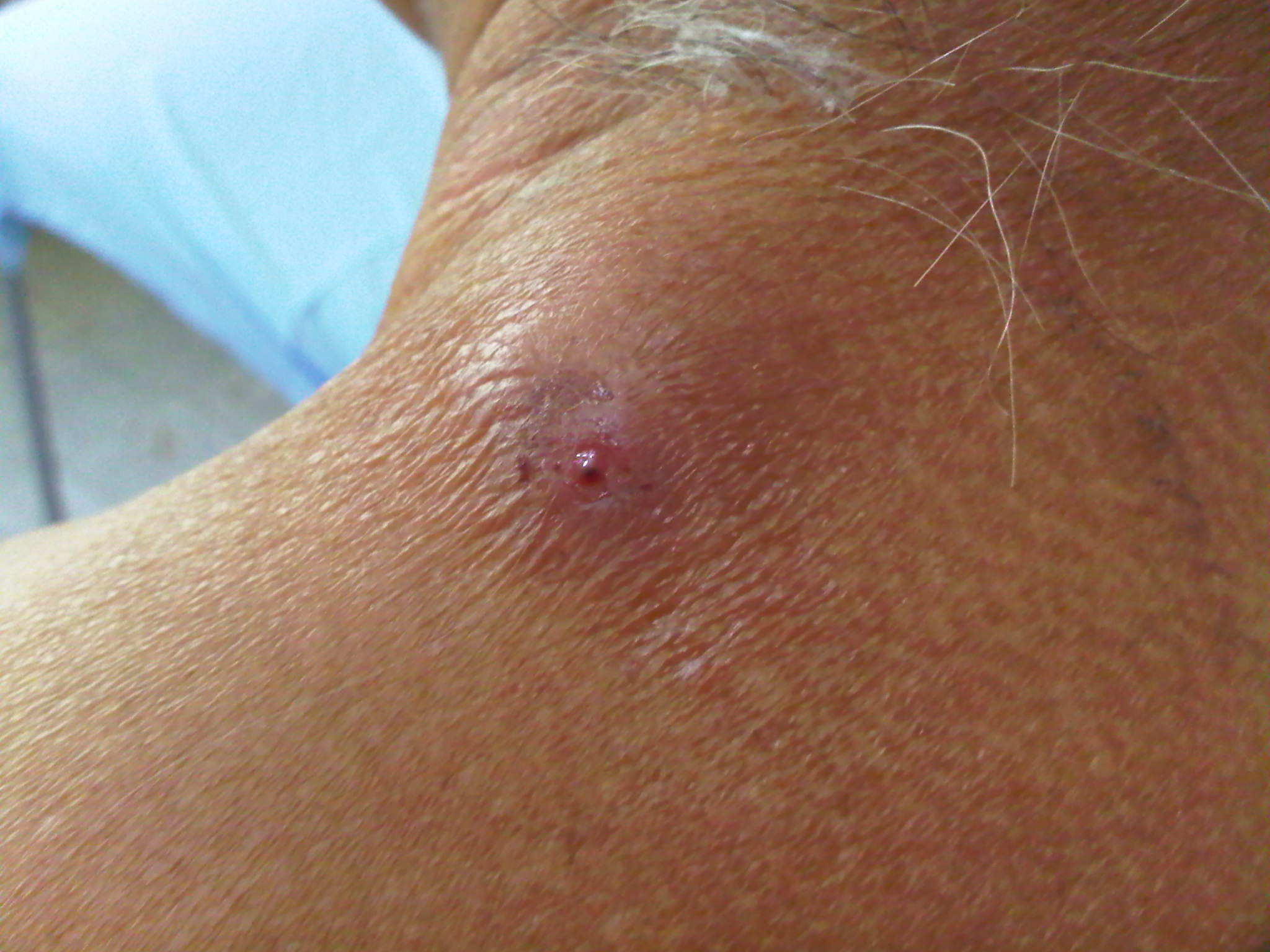
A human case of myiasis

=== Medical significance ===
The synanthropy of these flies is especially concerning, as their preference for human settlements may contribute to a major health impact in developing countries. Since these flies often breed in latrines, they are especially dangerous pests in areas with low sanitation. The effect of these flies is further compounded by their high population density and capability of widespread dispersal. Breeding in the feces of domestic animals, especially poultry, can spread pathogens to humans. Furthermore, their attraction to breeding on human and dog feces can make them vectors of diarrheal pathogens. This is supported by PCR analysis showing C. putoria flies infected with E. coli, Salmonella, and Shigella. Myiasis can also occur if an adult female lays eggs inside the body of a living animal.

While chemical insecticides are commonly used to control synanthropic fly populations, there are potential adverse side-effects of these chemicals on the health of humans, animals, crops, and the environment. Efforts to target latrines may be effective at reducing the impact of these pests, since latrines are a major source of fly populations.

Chrysomya putoria larvae have potential use in maggot therapy since their removal of dead tissue in wounds can promote the growth of new tissue.

=== Forensic importance ===
Since the larvae of C. putoria and other blowfly species actively decompose cadavers, understanding their life cycle duration can be used to estimate the PMI (post-mortem interval). Cocaine and other drugs in the cadaver's system can accelerate the life cycle of the larvae, therefore introducing error into PMI analysis. Ongoing studies on the impact of drugs on the life cycle duration can reduce potential sources of PMI estimation errors.
