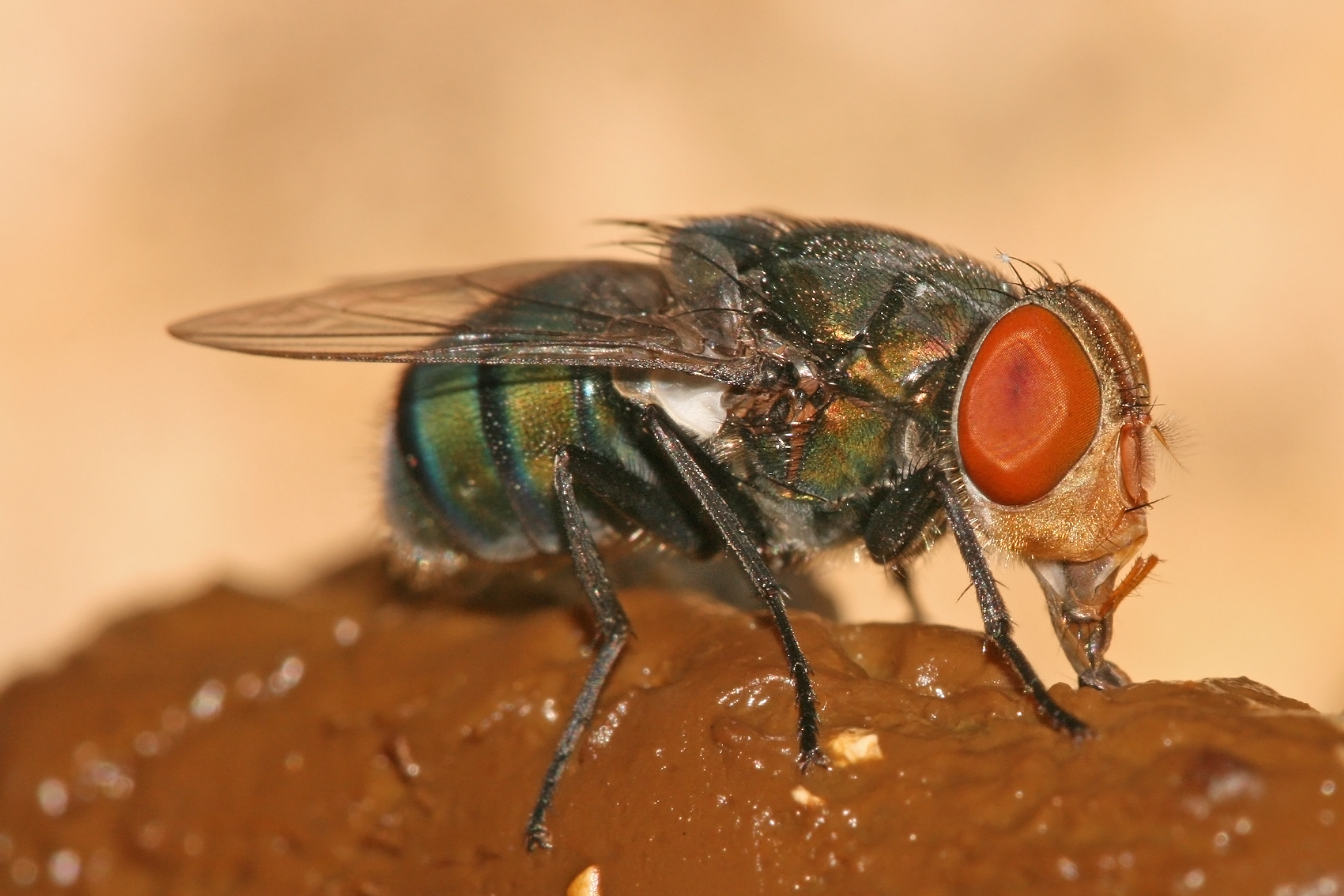
- Female C. megacephala
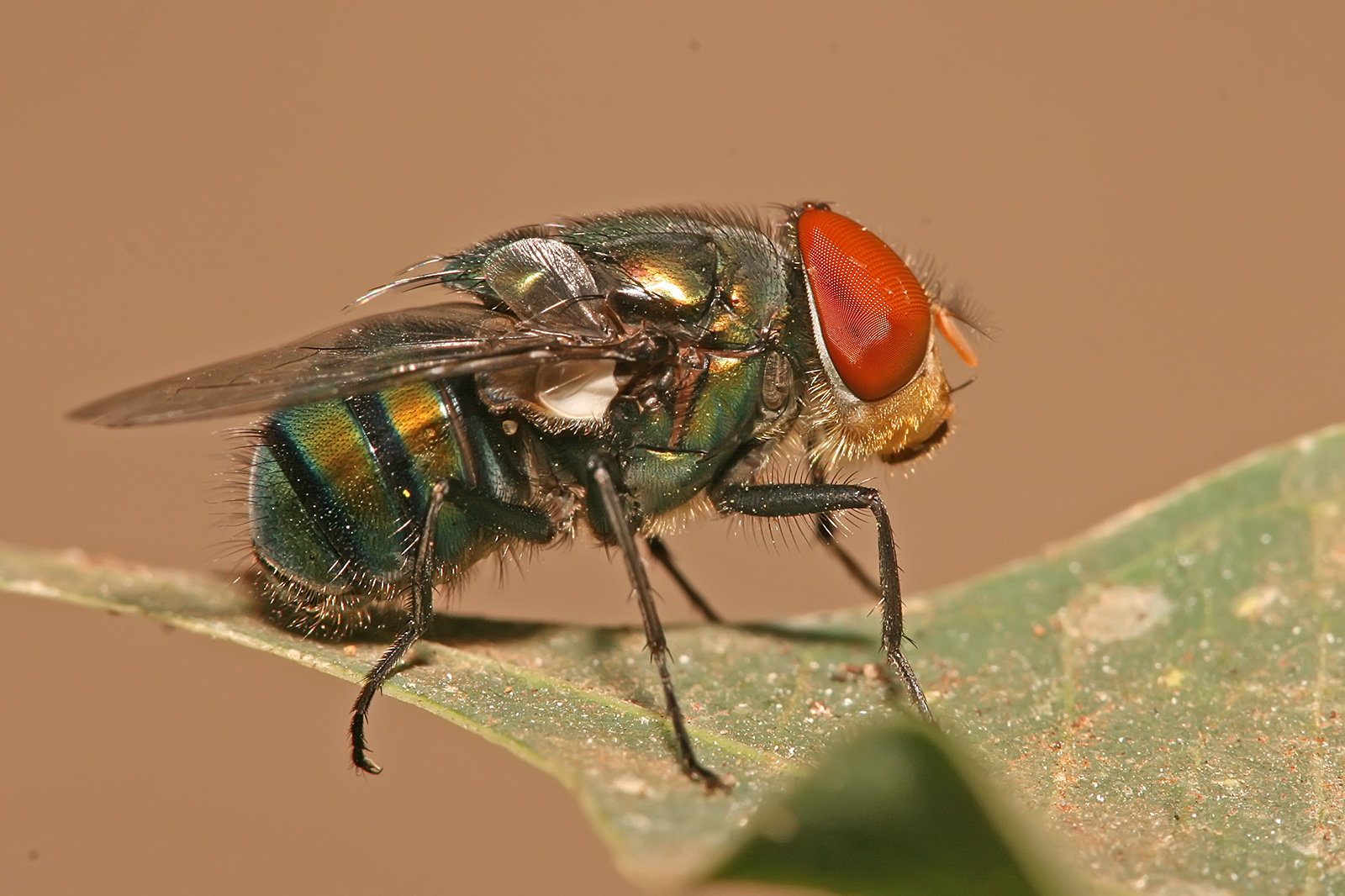
- Male C. megacephala

Scientific classification
- Kingdom: Animalia
- Phylum: Arthropoda
- Clade: Pancrustacea
- Class: Insecta
- Order: Diptera
- Family: Calliphoridae
- Genus: Chrysomya
- Species: C. megacephala

Binomial name
- Chrysomya megacephala (Fabricius, 1794)

Synonyms
- Musca megacephala Fabricius, 1794; Cosmina basalis (Smith, 1876); Pollenia basalis Smith, 1876

= Chrysomya megacephala =

Species of fly

Chrysomya megacephala, more commonly known as the oriental latrine fly or oriental blue fly, is a member of the family Calliphoridae (blowflies). It is a warm-weather fly with a greenish-blue metallic box-like body. The fly infests corpses soon after death, making it important to forensic science. This fly is implicated in some public health issues; it can be the cause of myiasis, and also infects fish and livestock.

== Description ==
Chrysomya megacephala's eggs are "oval with one flat face and another convex". Adult flies reflect a metallic blue-green color on their thorax and abdomen and have yellow gena, or cheeks. Larvae vary in size according to instar and are shaped more thickly towards the rear. C. megacephala have large red eyes, those of males being close together, and those of females farther apart. The cercus of the male is longer than that of the female.

== Distribution and habitat ==
Chrysomya megacephala has a wide geographical distribution. It is most common in the Oriental and Australasian realms. It is also found in Japan and the Palearctic realm. The range of C. megacephala has grown since the 1970s, with the species expanding into New Zealand and Africa, along with South, Central, and North America. C. megacephala entered the United States through harbors and airports. The fly has been found in California, as well as Texas, Louisiana, and Hawaii. C. megacephala exists in two forms, the normal and the derived. Tropical forests on the Pacific Islands, such as Samoa, are home to the normal form; the normal is considered to be the plesiomorphic form of C. megacephala. The derived form is thought to have emerged from Papua New Guinea and is said to be synanthropic, or ecologically associated with humans.

== Behavior and ecology ==
=== Climatic variation ===
Chrysomya megacephala prefer warm climates, and display a correlation between warmer temperatures and higher fecundity. In tropical populations, such as in Brazil, fertility is also lower in areas with high densities of larvae, where many in one small area compete for the same food source. A correlation between wing size and temperature as well as tibia size and temperature has also been found in this species. There was a similar relationship between wing and tibia size and fecundity. All three of these values variables, fecundity, wing size and tibia size, stay within the same range throughout the year, showing seasonal variation to be absent. This has been of interest to researchers, since this fly is present in high numbers in warm weather and low numbers in cold weather. The majority of Dipteran species that have had a life table constructed have demonstrated a tendency for smaller bodies in the warmer months. C. megacephala has a relatively long lifespan as an adult which has helped the species become successful at invading new geographical areas. The long adult lifespan means that the parents are present to rear the offspring, ensuring their survival.

=== Reproduction ===
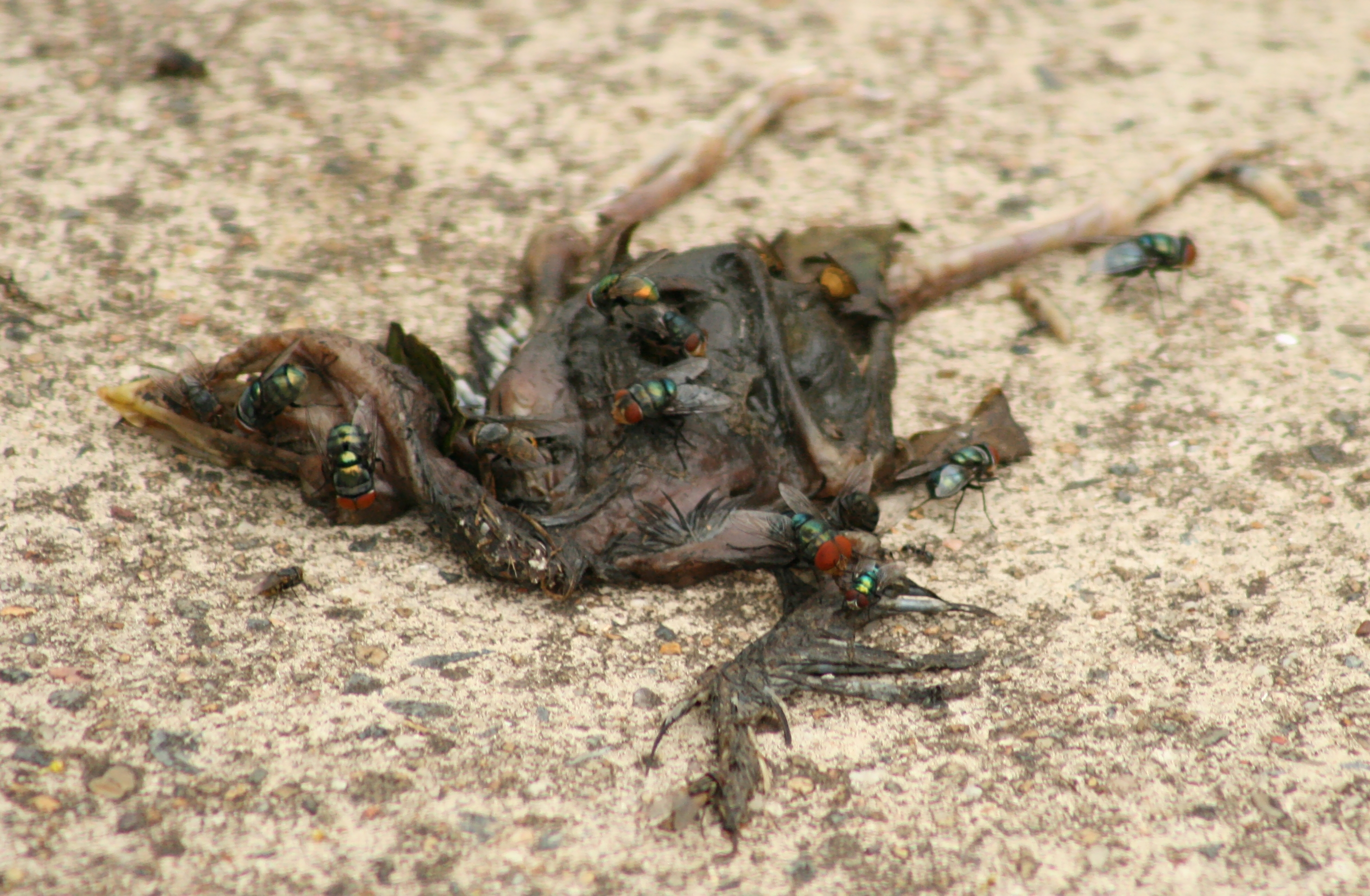
Flies laying eggs on a dead baby bird.

The developmental stages of C. megacephala include egg, larva and pupa. A female fly may lay as many as 200 to 300 eggs, often in human feces, meat or fish. Larval stages include first, second and third instals or growth periods. The eggs take approximately one day to develop, while the larvae take 5.4 days and the pupae 5.3 days. Population numbers as well as body size are greatly influenced by temperature. The adult lifespan of the fly is approximately seven days. The development of C. megacephala is linked to the length of time spent feeding in the larval stage, as well as to temperature; the lower the temperature, the more slowly the larvae develop. In laboratory studies conducted at 27 °C., eggs hatch in 18 hours; the first molt occurs in 30 hours; the second molt in 72 hours; pupation after 144 hours; and the adult emerges after approximately 234 hours. These intervals vary depending on geographical location; other environmental factors also can determine how long flies will stay in the larval stage. Males tend to emerge two or three hours ahead of the females.

The reproduction and survival rates of C. megacephala are closely related to developmental factors, including the amount of available food, and competition from larvae of other species, such as C. rufifacies. In the presence of competing larvae, those of C. megacephala spend less time feeding, leading to early pupation, smaller adults, and early reproduction. The second and third instar larvae of C. rufifacies are known predator that feeds on the larvae of C. megacephala when feeding substrate is less or larval density is high. In such cases C. megacephala tend to disperse early, thus remains malnourished.

=== Predators and prey ===
Chrysomya albiceps is also known to prey on C. megacephala during the larval stage when they must compete for the same food source. Beetles are also known to prey on C. megacephala. C. megacephala is not predaceous in the adult or larval form, preferring to feed on necrophagous material of any kind, such as fish, cows and humans.

=== Larval competition ===
Chrysomya megacephala larvae are known to compete with C. rufifacies larvae for food in a mixed-species environment. Research has shown that under specific population densities, C. rufifacies will facultatively feed on other species of maggots and on its own species. When C. rufifacies and C. megacephala larvae are put into cultures separately from one another in high densities, C. megacephala has a higher rate of survival than C. rufifacies. Both species had a lighter adult weight than normal and pupated earlier. The third instar of C. rufifacies will eat Chrysomya megacephala when the larvae are in high density. Despite this predation on Chrysomya megacephala, both species had a lower survival rate, lighter adult weight and pupated early.

== Forensic science ==
=== Importance in forensic science ===
C. megacephala is considered important to forensic science because it is one of the first flies to show up on a corpse, and so the time of death can easily be determined when Chrysomya megacephala larvae are found on a body. In many forensic entomology cases either C. rufifacies or Chrysomya megacephala are found on the decaying corpse; mitochondrial DNA is the main method used to determine which subfamily is present. The species' wide geographical distribution and high fecundity also make it useful in forensic cases; C. megacephala is among the most common blowflies found.

Larval dispersion patterns of C. megacephala also make it forensically important. Knowing that, to pupate, larvae move away from the food source to find a safe place to metamorphose, forensic entomologists can accurately calculate a post mortem interval. Knowledge of larval competition is also useful in forensic studies, because it could affect the estimate of the time of death. If only C. rufifacies is found on a body, it is not accurate to use only this species to calculate a time of colonization. The colonization of C. megacephala prior to C. rufifacies must be taken into account.

=== Larval-state poisoning detection ===
In any part of the world that uses organophosphates, C. megacephala could prove to be beneficial. Organophosphate compounds are used in agriculture and are highly toxic. Organophosphate poisoning often causes death, and in many cases, by evaluating the body tissue and fluids, the toxin can be identified as the source of the poisoning. However, it is somewhat difficult to evaluate the body tissue in a body that is exceedingly decomposed. Nevertheless, a medical examiner in Hawaii worked on a case in which poisoning by malathion, an organophosphate insecticide, was thought to be the cause of death. The victim's stomach contents and body fat were examined and found to have contained malathion. The fly larvae of Chrysomya megacephala and Chrysomya rufifacies were also present at the scene on the body and were tested for malathion. Both of these species did contain malathion, but there had been no previous record of organophosphates in their larvae. Studying larvae from decomposed remains may provide an effective method of determining the presence of these toxins in a body that is extremely decayed.

== Use in other research ==
Chrysomya megacephala has a beneficial and practical value apart from being significant in forensic investigations; this blowfly is the source of pollination for mangos in the Australian region. While most areas wish to rid themselves of C. megacephala, Taiwanese farmers have found ways to enhance the population of this blowfly so that more mangos will be pollinated.

== Public health and agricultural issues ==
=== Myiasis in livestock ===
Chrysomya megacephala causes myiasis in humans and animals. This causes losses in cattle and fish industries all over the world. Studies are being done on C. megacephala to determine its role as a vector for diarrhea-causing bacteria such as E. coli.

=== Public health importance and management control ===
Chrysomya megacephala are known to be the source of accidental (secondary) myiasis in humans, where the flies do not pierce the skin but invade an open wound. The first record of human myiasis caused by C. megacephala and C. rufifacies was in Thailand, where a 53-year-old man had a tumor lesion where the larvae accumulated. Most recorded myiasis cases, however, do not involve the fly. C. megacephala is a carrier of pathogens, such as bacteria, protozoan cysts, and helminth eggs, to human food, because it lays its eggs on human feces, and will land on human food soon after.

The flies also cause a huge economic problem in Asia, Africa, and the Pacific. In these areas sun-drying is the major method of preserving fish, as ice is typically unaffordable. However, blowfly larvae tend to infect these sun-dried fish when the weather is warm and humid. In an experiment, 95% of the infecting flies were found to be C. megacephala. The flies can be controlled by using an odor that the flies are attracted to trap them. Insecticides are also used, although this results in the development of resistance.

== See also ==
- Chrysomya bezziana
- Chrysomya albiceps
- Chrysomya rufifacies
