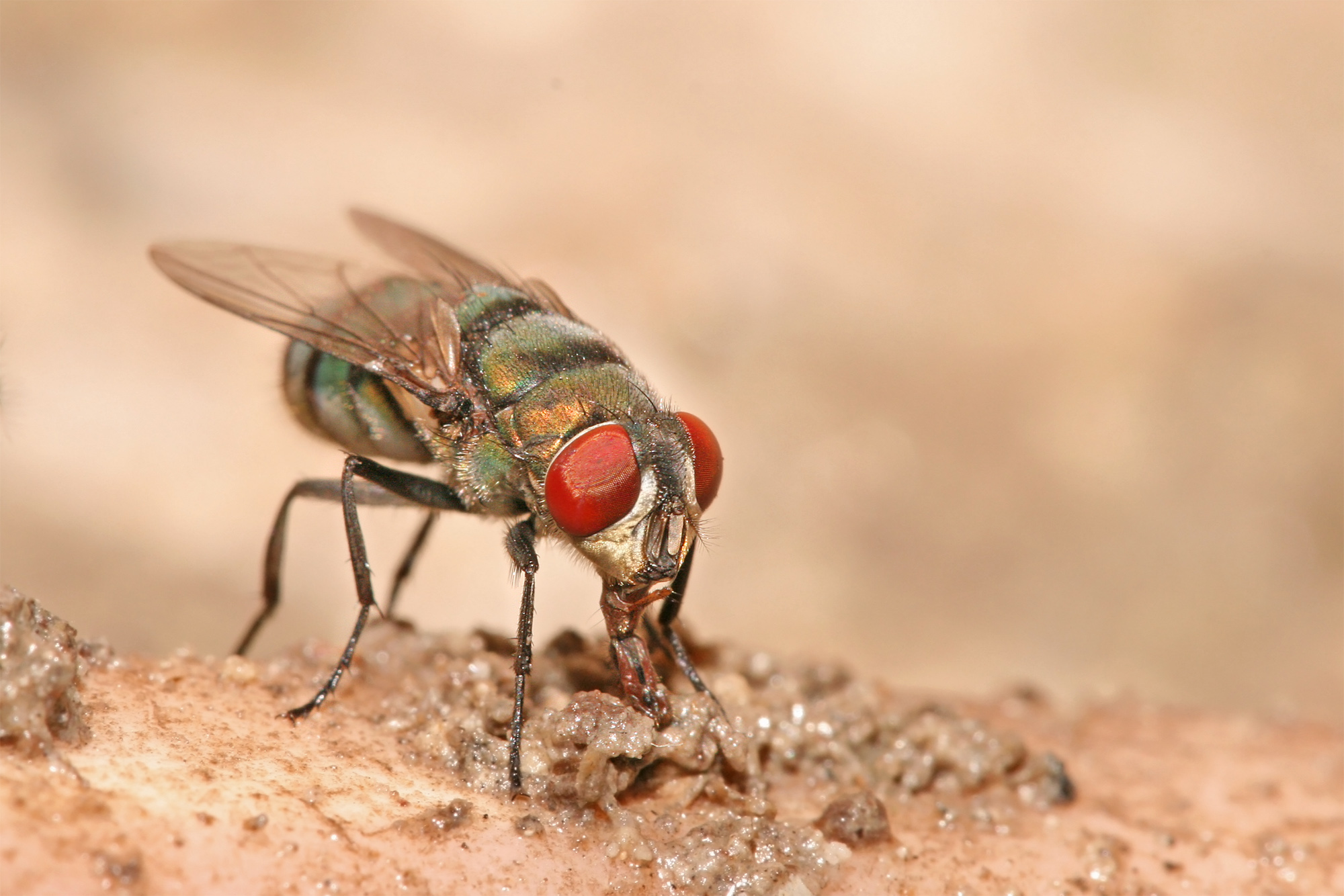
- Chrysomya albiceps

Scientific classification
- Kingdom: Animalia
- Phylum: Arthropoda
- Clade: Pancrustacea
- Class: Insecta
- Order: Diptera
- Family: Calliphoridae
- Subfamily: Chrysomyinae
- Genus: Chrysomya; Robineau-Desvoidy, 1830

Species
- See text

= Chrysomya =

Genus of flies

Chrysomya is an Old World blow fly genus of the family Calliphoridae. The genus Chrysomya contains a number of species including Chrysomya rufifacies and Chrysomya megacephala. The term “Old World blow fly” is a derivative of both the associated family, Calliphoridae (blow flies), and the belief that the genus Chrysomya originated in Asia and migrated to North America only relatively recently. Chrysomya’s primary importance to the field of medico-criminal forensic entomology is due to the genus’ reliable life cycle, allowing investigators to accurately develop a postmortem interval. Chrysomya adults are typically metallic colored with thick setae on the meron and plumose arista. The name comes from the word chrysos, meaning “golden” in reference to the metallic sheen of the genus’ species, and -mya, a derivation from the word myia, meaning “fly”.

== Description ==
=== Adults ===
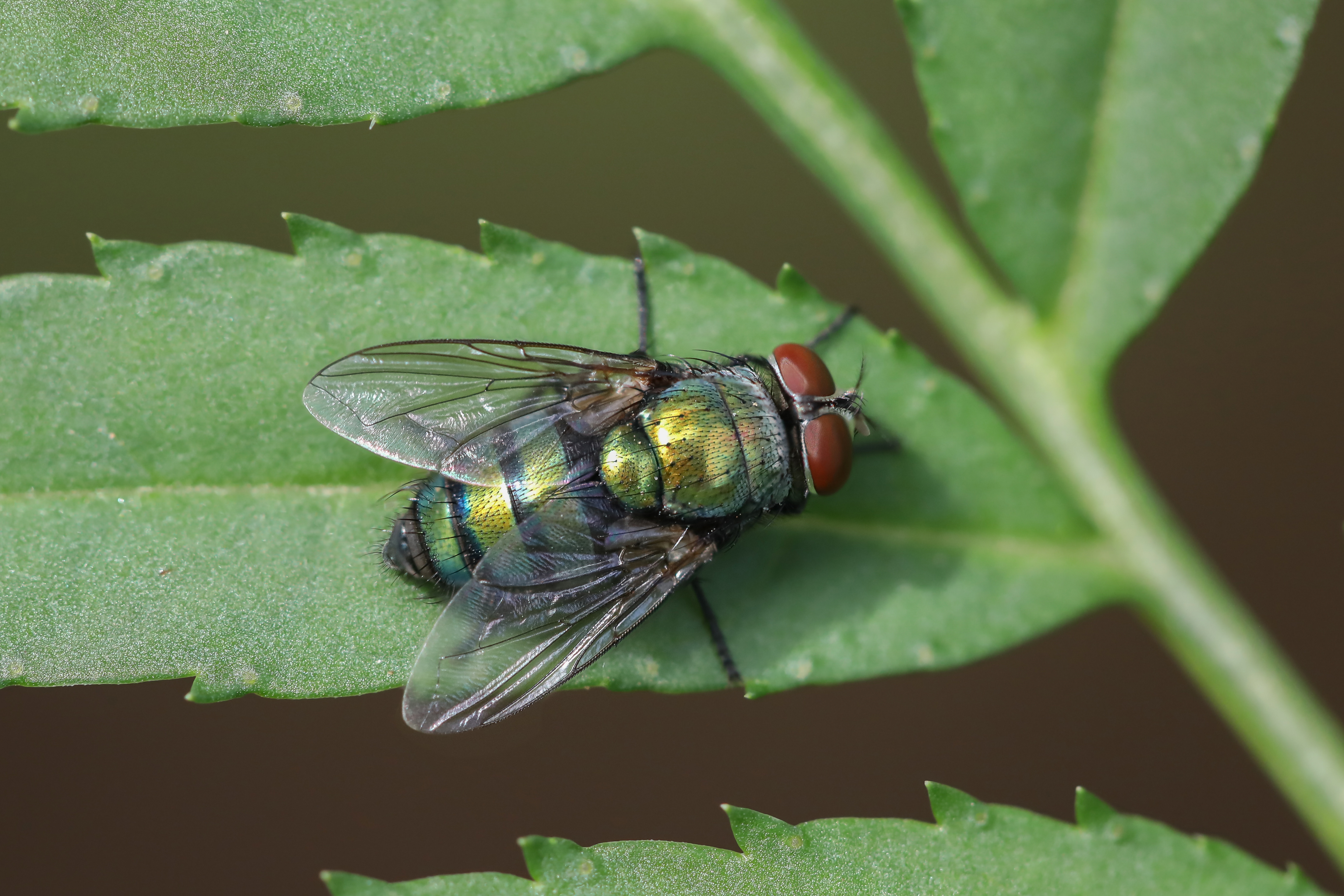
Chrysomya usually have blue/green metallic bodies

Identifying traits of the genus Chrysomya include:

- 10–12 mm bodies
- Metallic bodies
- Blue/green bodies
- Thick Setae on the meron
- Plumose arista

Keep in mind, however, that not all species will conform completely to these guidelines. Adults feed on many things including decaying matter, excreta, and flowers. In their six-week lifespan, (specific length may differ as a result of temperature, weather, etc.) females lay egg masses typically consisting of 50-200 eggs. Different species within this genus exhibit varying egg laying procedures. The species Chrysomya bezziana, for example, lay their eggs exclusively on live mammals. In contrast, most Chrysomya species prefer to perform oviposition on dead organisms. And, as with many fly genera primary and secondary myiasis is possible but unlikely.

=== Larvae ===
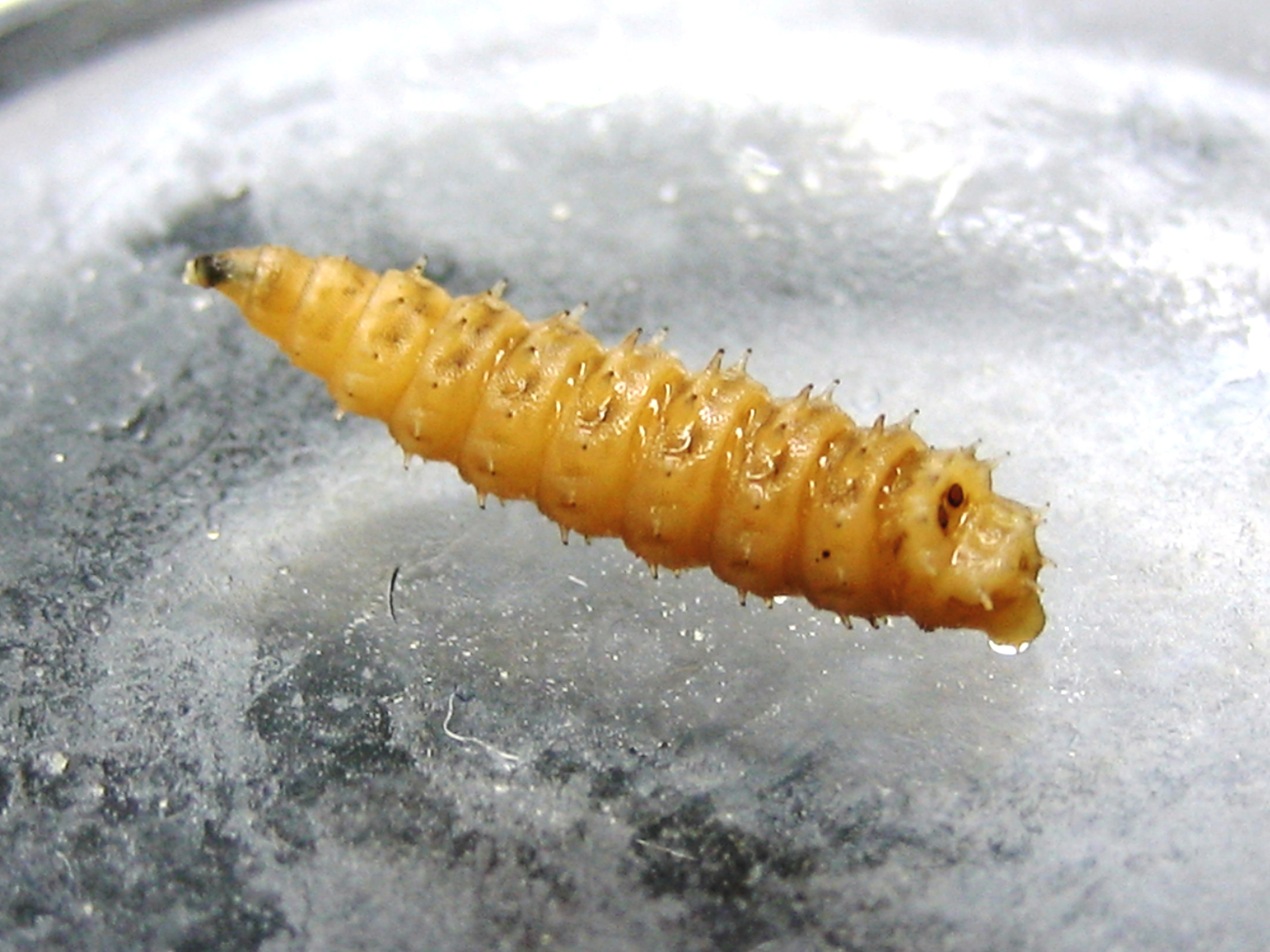
A Chrysomya rufifacies larva

The genus Chrysomya contains 12 species, several of which cause primary and secondary myiases of domestic animals. The larvae of one species, Chrysomya rufifacies, have very distinct thornlike processes covering its entire body, giving it the common name “hairy maggot blow fly”. The hairy appearance of C. rufifacies makes it easy to distinguish 2nd and 3rd instars from close relative, Chrysomya megacephela. Although the 1st instars are fairly similar, C. megacephela are characterized by thicker spiracle hairs in the 2nd and 3rd instars.

== Life cycle ==
Chrysomya, like other fly genera, are holometabolous and have four developmental stages: egg, larva, pupa, and adult. This life cycle is extremely short, and therefore valuable in determining an accurate post mortem interval in forensic entomology. Depending on temperature, the entire life cycle, involving development from egg to adult, takes only between 190 and 598 hours. Eggs are approximately 1 mm long and are laid in a mass typically consisting of 50 to 200 eggs. If females participate in group oviposition, the results are much larger masses containing thousands of eggs that may completely cover a decomposing carcass. These eggs are typically yellowish or white in color and, when laid, look like rice balls. The eggs hatch in as little as eight hours. This depends on air temperature and the ability of larvae to feed on carrion, until consuming enough calories to progress through the final larval stage (the third instar); mature third instars travel away from the corpse, usually into shallow soil, and pupate. During this time, the larval skin, which was initially milky white, actually shrinks and hardens to form a dark brown puparium. This stage may last as long as 12 days, while some adults emerge in seven to eight days, again depending on temperature. Generally the warmer the temperature, the faster the life cycle is completed. Once in adult form, C. rufifacies oviposits approximately five days after mating, and lives an average of six weeks.

== Myiasis ==
Myiasis is the infestation of vertebrate tissue by dipterous larvae. These larvae feed on the dead or living tissue of their vertebrate hosts. Several species of Chrysomya are known to cause myiasis in animals and/or humans. One species, Chrysomya albiceps, feeds on only diseased tissue of a host. A second species, Chrysomya rufifacies, is a predator of primary parasites and was once used as a treatment for osteomyelitis. Another species, Chrysomya bezziana, is one of the most important causes of myiasis in the Old World. Cattle are the main host of this larvae, as well as humans and other domestic animals.

== Predation ==
The majority of Chrysomya species are known for being voracious predators of other blow fly species during the maggot stage. Two of the major predatory species of the family Calliphoridae include: Chrysomya rufifacies and C. albiceps. C. albiceps is thought to be a mechanical vector of various diseases due to its association with filth. C. rufifacies predation of other fly species can have a profound effect on PMI estimates and actual survivorship of the host fly species. Studies showed that predation by C. rufifacies on Cochliomyia macellaria caused a dramatic decrease in survivorship, from 36.3% to 10%.

== Selected species ==
=== Chrysomya rufifacies ===
Geographical Location
Chrysomya rufifacies is found widespread throughout the southern US, including southern California, Arizona, Texas, Louisiana, and Florida. It is known to occupy areas of Central America, Japan, and India. Chrysomya rufifacies was not discovered in the United States until 1980 and is believed to be a recent immigrant. The fact that this species of fly has only been found in America recently but has been found in most tropic countries of the “Old World” for some time leads to its surname, the “Old World blow fly”. New research has shown evidence of C. rufifacies in Ontario during the fall season. As temperatures increase due to global warming, colonies of C. rufifacies are predicted to spread well into southern Ontario and Quebec.

=== Chrysomya megacephala ===
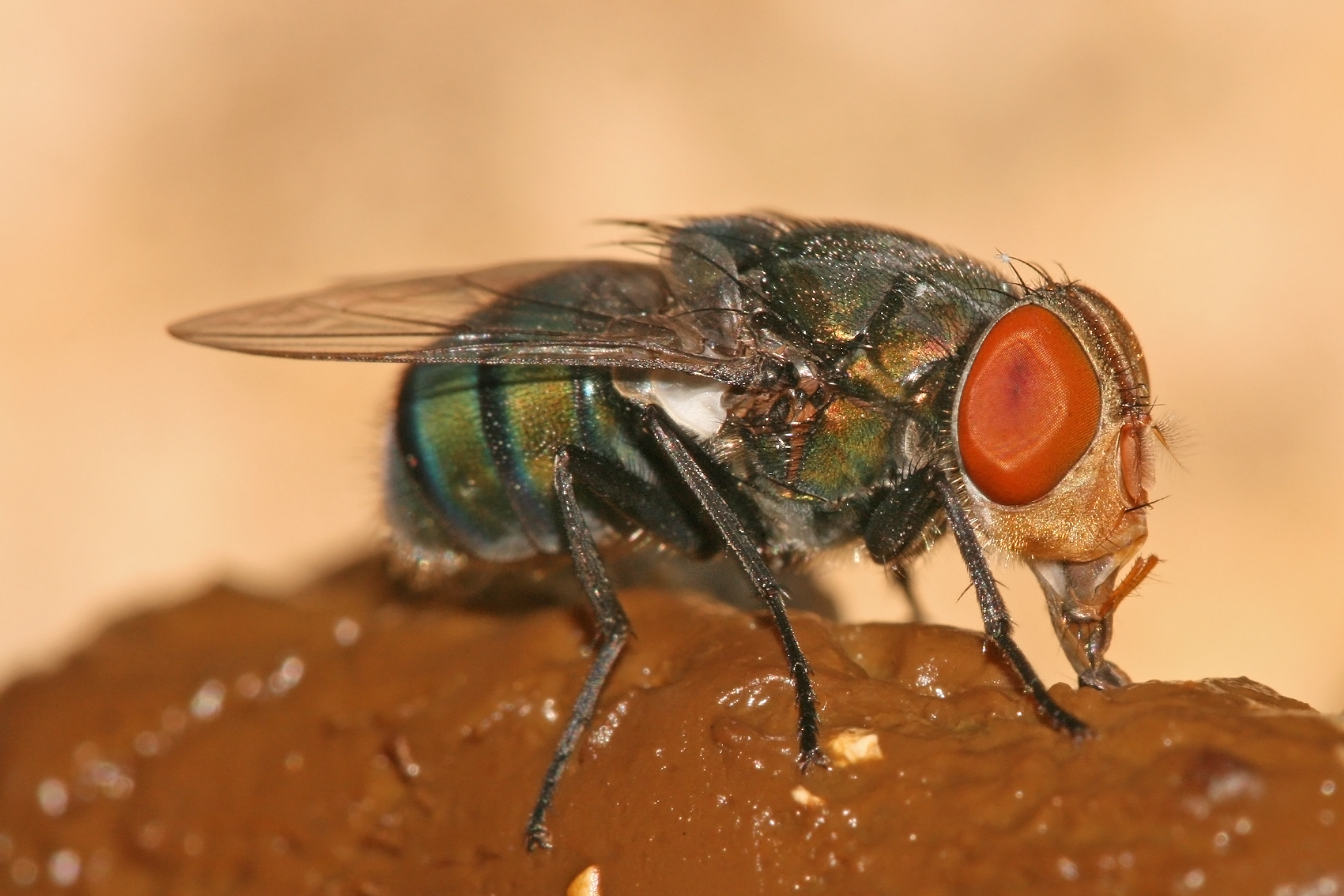
A female Chrysomya megacephala feeding on feces

Geographical Location
C. megacephala exhibits a widely ranged distribution throughout the Asian regions, South Africa, and South America. This species has recently become well established within the southern United States, as well. C. megacephala is one species that prefers higher temperatures and undergoes the bulk of activity during peak heat periods of the afternoon.

=== Characteristics ===
The larvae of Chrysomya rufifacies are the most easily identified stage of the species. The larvae can get up to approximately 14mm in length with a yellow/orange color and have conical fleshy tubercles down the length of their bodies that give these maggots a slightly hairy appearance even though it does not possess any true hairs. The larvae of C. rufifacies are predatory, meaning that they are typically secondary colonists to a fresh corpse and will devour the maggots of the primary colonist species. If resources are especially scarce, the larvae of C. rufifacies may become cannibalistic and prey upon other C. rufifacies larvae. Third instar C. rufifacies larvae are capable of potentially expelling other maggots from a feeding site with use of their large fleshy tubercles. The pupae of C. rufifacies typically resemble rodent droppings or cockroach egg casings. The adult C. rufifacies are typically between 10 and 12mm in length with a metallic colored body. The adult fly’s body color is generally a metallic blue/green. While color does play a role in distinguishing between members of the family Calliphoridae, the arrangement of setae is the most accurate way to distinguish most species. All species of Chrysomya possess setae on the meron, and black abdominal tergites. The easiest way to distinguish C. rufifacies from C. megacephala is to examine the anterior thoracic spiracle, on the adult fly’s body. C. rufifacies has a pale colored anterior thoracic spiracle while C. megacephala has a dark brown or dark orange anterior thoracic spiracle. The C. rufifacies adult possesses three faint thoracic stripes in the pronotal region. C. megacephala are typically a shorter, more stout bodied fly with its tell tale signs being a larger head and prominent red eyes.

== Forensic importance ==
Chrysomya rufifacies adults are usually the first to colonize a fresh corpse. In the southern U.S., this can happen within hours, sometimes minutes, of the host's death. This “hairy maggot blow fly” is the most common maggot found on corpses, and its consistent developmental time is extremely helpful when establishing a post mortem interval. However, C. rufifacies can have the opposite effect since its second and third instar larvae are known to be predacious, feeding on other maggots that might have colonized the body first. In addition, C. rufifacies are known to be cannibalistic as when the second and third instars feed on young first instars. The larvae are able to burrow inches into the ground to reach food and inhabit a buried corpse. It is proven that organic chemistry can be used to determine the age of post-feeding larvae. The hydrocarbon composition of the larvae was found to correlate with age. This is a huge discovery since cuticular hydrocarbon composition is a more accurate method of determining post-feeding larvae age as compared to previous methods of measuring larval crop length, for example.

== Species ==
- Chrysomya albiceps (Wiedemann, 1819)
- Chrysomya bezziana Villeneuve, 1914
- Chrysomya chloropyga (Wiedemann, 1818)
- Chrysomya fulvicruris Robineau-Desvoidy, 1830
- Chrysomya inclinata Walker, 1861 (Synonyms: C. grienieri Rickenbach, 1959, C. roubaudi Séguy, 1926, C. tellinii Bezzi, 1908)
- Chrysomya marginalis (Wiedemann, 1830)
- Chrysomya megacephala (Fabricius, 1794)
- Chrysomya obscura Bigot, 1891
- Chrysomya pinguis (Walker), 1858
- Chrysomya putoria (Wiedemann, 1830)
- Chrysomya rufifacies Macquart, 1843
- Chrysomya villeneuvi Patton, 1922
