= John Forney Zacharias =

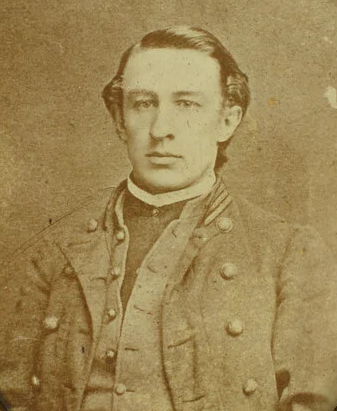

John Forney Zacharias (2 December 1837 – 16 August 1904) was an American surgeon who served in the confederate army. He was among the first in America to make use of maggots to treat gangrene.

Zacharias was born in Frederick City, Maryland, to Rev. Daniel and Catherine Zinn Forney. He was educated at Frederick Academy and then received an MD from Jefferson Medical College, Philadelphia, in 1860 with a thesis on knee-joint diseases. He then practices in Frederick City. He served as an assistant surgeon in the Confederate States Army from 1862 to 1865 and then practiced in Leesburg and from 1870 in Cumberland, Maryland. He is noted for his use of maggots of the blow fly to treat hospital gangrene. He used them at Danville, Virginia, and noted that "I first used maggots to remove the decayed tissue in hospital gangrene and with eminent satisfaction. In a single day they would clean a wound much better than any agents we had at our command. I used them afterwards at various places. I am sure I saved many lives by their use, escaped septicaemia, and had rapid recoveries." He died in Cumberland at his drug store.
