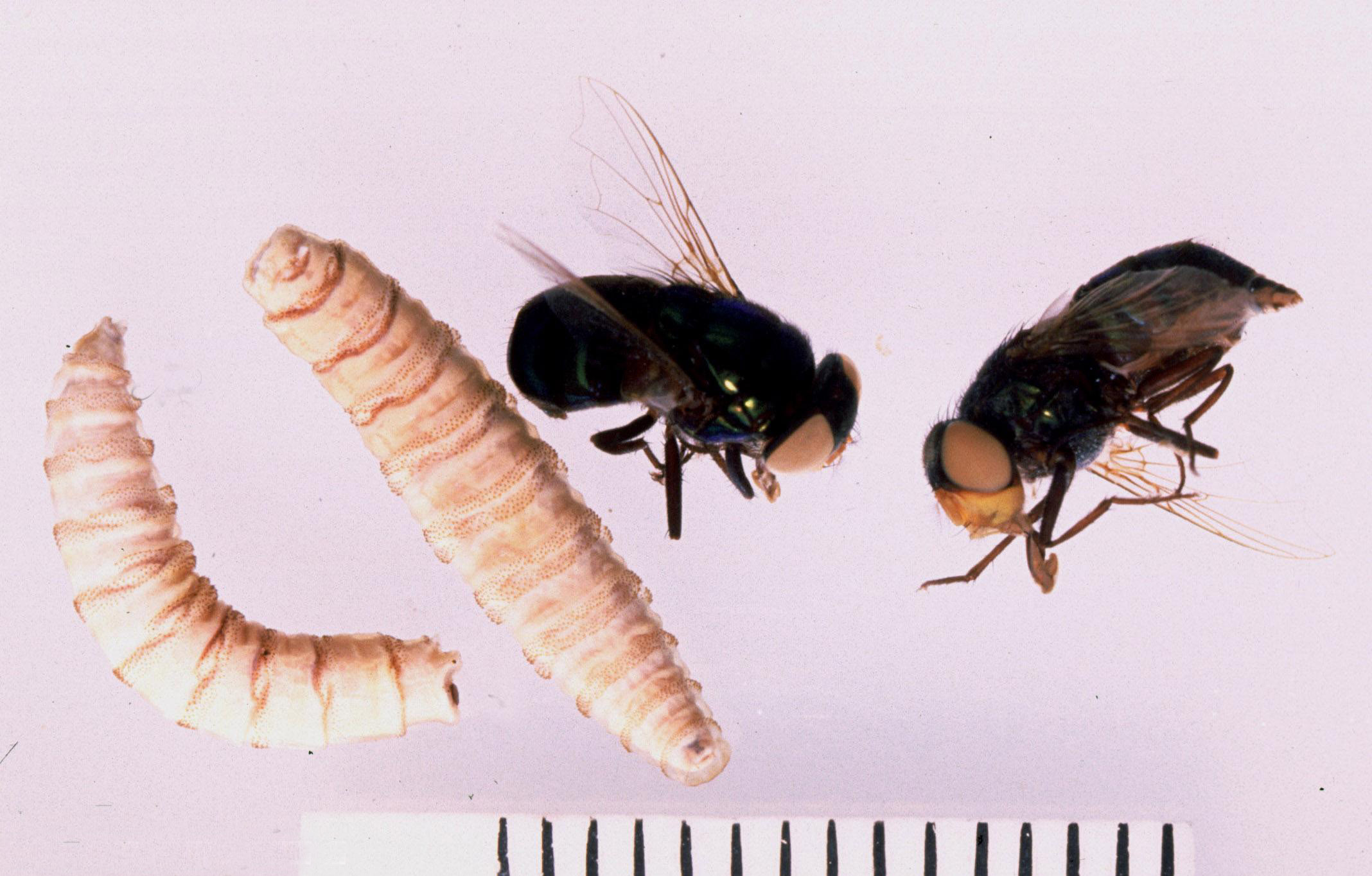
- Chrysomya bezziana adult and larva

Scientific classification
- Kingdom: Animalia
- Phylum: Arthropoda
- Clade: Pancrustacea
- Class: Insecta
- Order: Diptera
- Family: Calliphoridae
- Genus: Chrysomya
- Species: C. bezziana

Binomial name
- Chrysomya bezziana (Villeneuve, 1914)

= Chrysomya bezziana =

Species of fly

Chrysomya bezziana, also known as the Old World screwworm fly or screwworm, is an obligate parasite of mammals. Obligate parasitic flies require a host to complete their development. Named to honor the Italian entomologist Mario Bezzi, this fly is widely distributed in Asia, tropical Africa, India, and Papua New Guinea. The adult can be identified as metallic green or blue with a yellow face, and the larvae are smooth, lacking any obvious body processes except on the last segment.

The screwworm adult feeds on decaying organic matter, while the fly larvae feed on the living tissue of warm-blooded mammals as opposed to necrotic tissue on which many other fly larvae feed. Since the larvae can cause permanent tissue damage, C. bezziana has caused much public concern. Management procedures include both prevention of colonization of the fly and treatment of a current infestation.

Chrysomya bezziana belongs to the genus Chrysomya, which contains Chrysomya rufifacies and Chrysomya putoria. C. bezziana and other members of this genus can be used to estimate the post-mortem interval in forensic entomology.

== Geographical distribution ==
Chrysomya bezziana is widely distributed throughout tropical areas in the Old World. It is most prevalent in Southeast Asia, tropical and subtropical Africa, some countries in the Middle East, India, the Malay Peninsula, the Indonesian and Philippine Islands, and Papua New Guinea. C. bezziana is not found at altitudes higher than 2500 meters above sea level.

In countries where C. bezziana does not exist, scientists and those in agriculture are worried that commercial flights, boats, or vehicles could distribute the fly. The climates in which C. bezziana thrives are present in Australia and the Americas; the fly requires climates similar to its New World relative, Cochliomyia hominivorax. Spread of the pest from Papua New Guinea to Australia has become a concern for Australia, as the presence of C. bezziana could cost livestock industries up to $500 million a year.

== Characteristics ==
Chrysomya bezziana belongs to the fly family Calliphoridae. This family comprises blow flies, carrion flies, and cluster flies. Other parasitic screwworms are found in this family, such as Cochliomyia hominivorax and Cochliomyia macellaria.

=== Adult ===
The body of the C. bezziana adult is typically metallic green or blue. The face of this species is typically yellow with soft, fine, yellow hairs. The length of an adult fly ranges between 8 and 12 mm. The abdominal tergites (the segments of the dorsal portion of the fly) have narrow darker bands and the legs are black or dark brown. Only the bases of the wings are infuscated; the wings have a glassy appearance. The anterior spiracles (small openings on the surface for the respiratory system) range from dark brown to orange.

Another close relative, Chrysomya megacephala, occurs in many of the same regions as C. bezziana, so being able to distinguish between the flies is important. The male fly can be distinguished from C. megacephala by its eye facets. C. bezziana does not have a boundary dividing the upper and lower eye facets, while C. megacephala does have a boundary distinguishing them.The female does not have as distinct differences and cannot be as easily distinguished from C. megacephala, but can be identified by analyzing the frons (the uppermost part of the head of an insect). The frons of C. bezziana is more parallel, while C. megacephala has a frons that is distinctly narrow in the center.

=== Larvae ===
The third-instar larvae are smooth, lacking obvious body processes except on the last segment. The posterior spiracles are not hidden in the body cavity, and the peritreme of these spiracles is open. The larvae can be distinguished from its New World relative C. hominivorax by observing the dorsal tracheal trunks. Those of C. hominivorax are darkly pigmented from the 12th segment to the 10th or sometimes 9th segment, while those of C. bezziana are only pigmented for the last half of the 12th segment. The anterior spiracle has four to six lobes, with three or seven on occasion.

== Life cycle ==
The female lays around 150–200 eggs at a time, in wounds and mucous membranes of a live mammal, and will hatch after 24 hours. The larvae feed on living tissue and are especially attracted to blood. The larvae feed on the host tissue for 5–7 days while they complete their development, then they fall to the ground to pupate.

The pupal stage is temperature-dependent with warm weather favoring growth. Depending on the temperature, the pupal stage can last from 1 week to 2 months. The males become sexually mature after 24 hours of leaving their puparium (the hardened shell in which the pupae mature), while females take about 6–7 days to become fully sexually mature. If the weather is tropical (29 °C or 84.2 °F), the entire lifecycle will last about 24 days, but at cooler temperatures (below 22 °C or 71.6 °F), the life ycle can take 2–3 months to complete.

== Medical importance ==
Chrysomya bezziana usually infects livestock, causing myiasis, which is the infestation of tissue (living or dead) on a living mammal by fly larvae. Mammals such as sheep, dogs, cattle, pigs, and even humans can become infested.

The adult female lays her eggs on superficial wounds in live animals, preferring wounds that are several days old. Eggs of C. bezziana are commonly laid in the navel of newborn livestock species or on castration wounds in cattle. Eggs are also laid on open sores, ulcers, scratches externally, or mucous membranes throughout the body. Wounds as small as a tick bite are large enough for a female to lay her eggs.

When the eggs hatch, the larvae burrow into the animal's living tissue and feed on it. Their common name, "screwworms", is derived from the maggots that embed themselves into the flesh of their host in a screw-like fashion. The larvae can burrow as deep as 15 cm (5.9 in) into the host's living tissue. As the maggots feed and cause tissue damage, the wound produces a characteristic odor, which can go unnoticed by humans. However, this odor entices more female flies to the wound and encourages them to lay their eggs there, as well, causing further infestation.

C. bezziana is different from other fly species because tissue infestation can occur in the absence of necrotic tissue. The C. bezziana maggots may cause serious and permanent tissue damage. Extremely infested wounds can lead to death if not treated. The sexually mature adult imago feeds on decomposing corpses, decaying matter, excreta, and flowers. Due to their diet, these adult flies can be a mechanical vector for pathogens.

== Forensic importance ==
Forensic entomologists give a time that, at the very earliest, the corpse could have been colonized by insects instead of giving a time of death; this is because the time of colonization is not always concurrent with the time of death. They provide the shortest post mortem interval possible.

The adults are attracted to decaying matter, thus they can be found on dead bodies. However, because C. bezziana can cause myiasis and lay its eggs on a live mammal, determining a time of colonization can be more complicated. If the fly laid its eggs and the maggots hatched prior to the death of the corpse and the forensic entomologist does not take this into account, the entomologist could give an incorrect time of colonization.

== Public concern ==
Because C. bezziana is an agent of myiasis, public concern has been raised over this fly. However, most human cases documented are debilitated patients not fully capable of taking care of themselves and dressing their own wounds. Caretakers of debilitated patients are encouraged to keep the environment where the patient resides clean. Keeping the area free of decaying organic matter, such as trash, decaying plants, or excreta prevents the flies from being attracted to the patient's residence, and in turn, the patient. Caretakers should also practice good hygiene themselves to prevent bringing a screwworm with them. The public can take measures to protect themselves from this fly with basic fly-proofing methods, such as screens.

Wounds should be cleaned and dressed properly to prevent infestation of the fly, as C. bezziana is attracted to wound fluids and blood to lay her eggs. If people suspect that their animals or livestock have been a victim of fly strike, they should bring the case to the attention of their veterinarian for analysis.

== Management and control ==
Management of C. bezziana can be conducted using several different methods, depending upon the adult or larvae form.

To remove and manage the infestation of larvae in the host, the larvae may be removed with forceps. This removal process should take place daily or as often as needed until the infestation is clear. These larvae can also be killed by applying proper insecticides to the infected areas and making sure the wounds are properly dressed. Organophosphorus insecticides, such as coumaphos, dichlofenthion, and fenchlorphos, can be applied to wounds with fly larvae. These cause the larvae to leave the wound and fall to the ground, and the larvae die from being without a host or from the chemical. Castration wounds in cattle that have insect growth regulators, such as dicyclanil, have high success rates of preventing the establishment of C. bezziana.

When trying to manage areas that have adults of C. bezziana, one of the first tasks is to improve sanitation of the area. Many types of decaying matter serve as a food source and should be cleared out of the area. Adult flies can also be controlled by the use of insecticides. A few of the insecticides that are available for use in the management of adult C. bezziana include ectopor, diazinon, nagasunt, and coumaphos. When trying to prevent infestation of livestock and other animals, proper spraying and dipping with these insecticides can help in their control.

=== Sterile insect technique ===
The sterile insect technique (SIT), also known as sterile insect release method (SIRM), is a control method in which sterile insects are released to mate with other wild insects. Usually, the males are sterilized using radiation and then dispersed in a population to compete with wild males. If a sterile male mates with a wild female, she will produce no offspring, reducing the new population.

Studies have been conducted involving C. bezziana and the sterile insect technique. In 1989, an experiment proved that SIRM had success rates similar to C. hominivorax, which was successfully eradicated from most of North America in 1982. The success of SIT as an eradication method depends on the number of sterile insects released, on how competitive the sterile insects are in relation to their wild counterparts, and on whether the female insect mates once or multiple times. SIT is supported by the extensive use of pesticides. To this date, however, C. bezziana has not been eradicated using this method.

=== Vaccination ===
In 2000, vaccination of livestock against C. bezziana was explored. The results were promising in vitro (outside of the body in controlled environments, like a petri dish) and in vivo (tested with living animals). The animals vaccinated led to C. bezziana larvae with lower weights. The effects of larvae with lower weights could lessen the damage caused to the living tissue of the maggots, and it could also reduce the fly development. The potential of vaccination as a control source was still unresolved, as the immunological mechanisms are very complex and follow-up studies need to be conducted.

== Case studies ==
A case study reported in 2009 involving C. bezziana included a 65-year-old woman with skin cancer. The woman had facial squamous cell carcinoma (SCC). A tumor developed as an ulcer on her left cheek, and the woman did not keep the wound covered. When the ulcer began to spread, she did not seek any treatment for the myiasis for two years. Ultimately, the case was handled by removal of the larvae using forceps until about 60 larvae were removed. The patient was discharged and two days later returned to have 10 more larvae removed from her face. Infestation of C, bezziana in cancerous wounds is very rare and most of the cases deal with SCC among elderly patients.

Many cases among humans involve infestation of the oral cavity. Early reported cases of infestation of the mouth were found in India in 1946. According to the Communicable Diseases Watch newsletter, 11 of the 21 infestations in Hong Kong between October 2002 and December 2004 were in the oral cavity.

Another case study, reported in 2008, involved a 9-year-old boy in Indonesia. He was hospitalized due to maggots inside his right ear. The maggots were removed, and while the patient was recovering, the right eye was found to be red. Upon examination, a maggot was found inside a lesion in the bulbar conjunctiva, and this maggot was then removed.

== Current research ==
According to a pest control officer for the Food and Hygiene Department in 2009, the Hong Kong government (where many of the case studies are published) is unaware of any research in this field. The most recent research done on this fly was published in January 2008 and involved identifying fly eggs using a scanning electron microscope for use in forensic investigations.

It is not a suitable fly for research in maggot therapy, because it can cause permanent damage by feeding on the underlying tissues, so most studies published on the subject do not include C. bezziana.
