= Prostigma =

In flies of the order Diptera, the prostigma (also called stigma anteriore or anterior spiracle) is the anterior of the two pairs of spiracles opening on the pleura. The mesothoracic (anterior) pair is located between the pro- and mesothorax and the metathoracic pair (developed mainly in nematocerous Diptera) between the meso- and metathothorax. The following illustration shows the prostigma as number 13 on the right side of the image. The function of the prostigma (as well as the anterior stigma) is to provide an airway into the insect's thorax to facilitate respiration.
