= Maggot therapy =

Wound care by maggot therapy

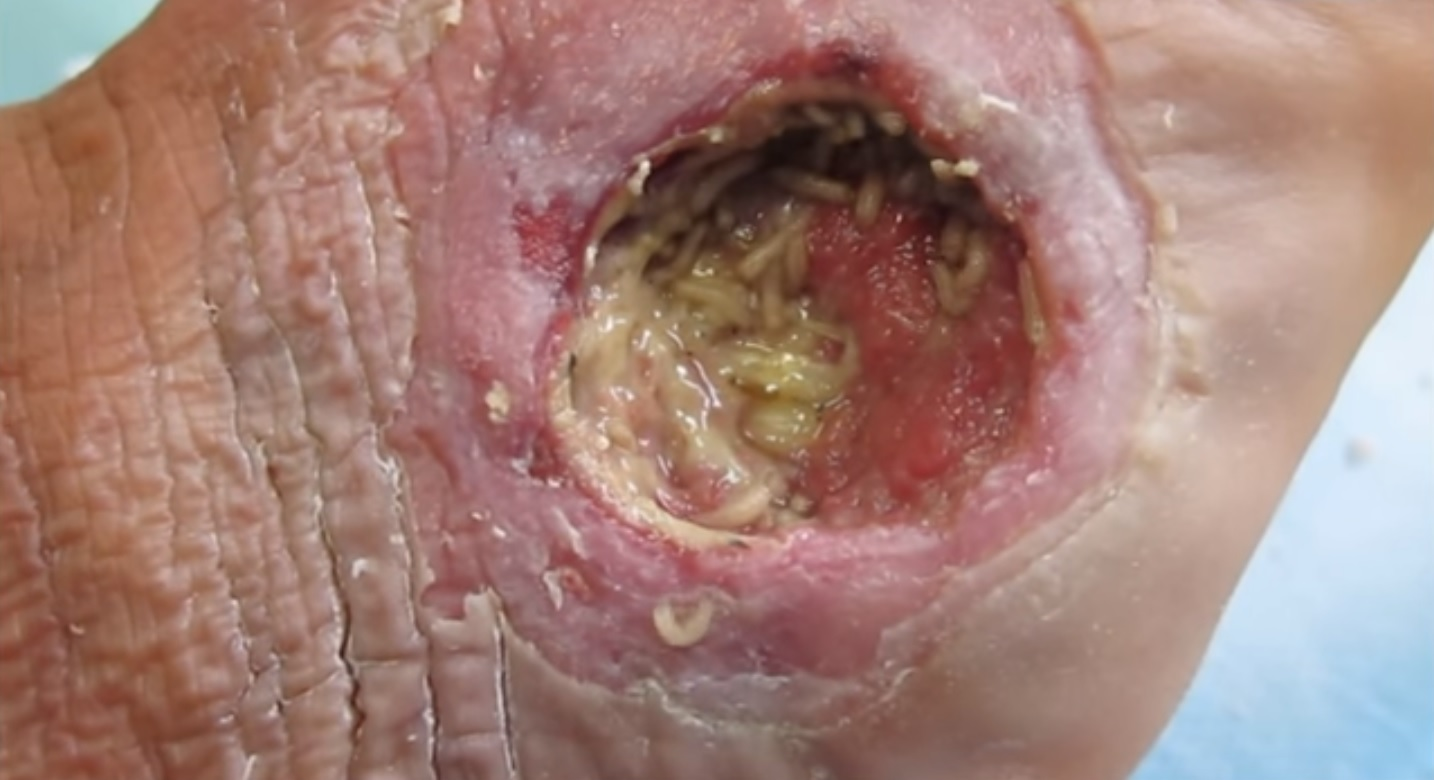
- Maggot debridement therapy on a wound from a diabetic foot
- Other names: maggot debridement therapy (MDT), larval therapy, larva therapy, larvae therapy, biodebridement, biosurgery

Maggot debridement therapy (also known as MDT, larval therapy, or simply maggot therapy) is a type of biotherapy involving the introduction of live, disinfected maggots into non-healing skin and soft-tissue wounds of a human or other animal for the purpose of cleaning out the necrotic tissue within a wound (debridement), and disinfection. There is evidence that maggot therapy may help with wound healing.

== Medical uses ==
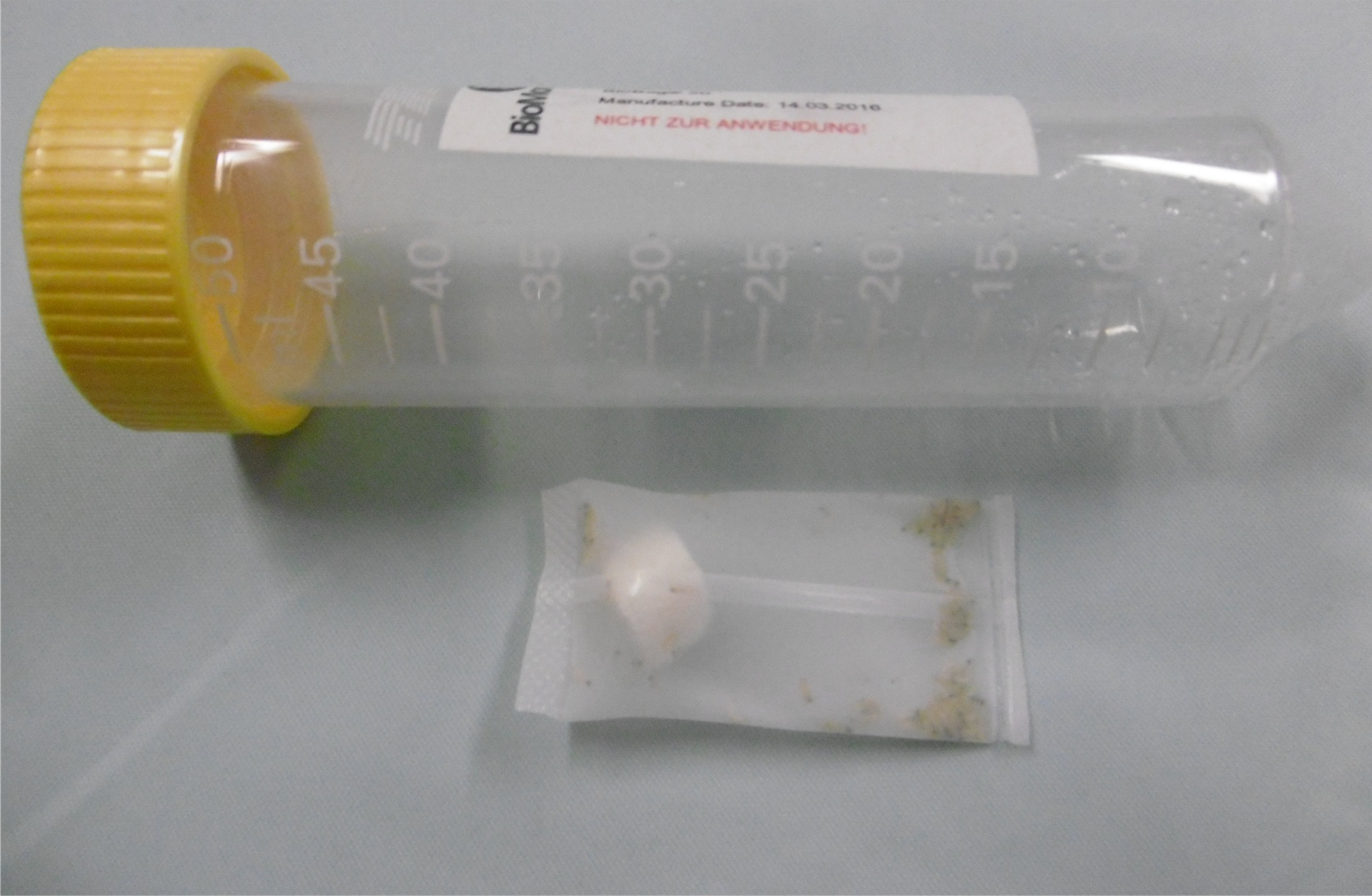
Maggots in medical packaging

Maggot therapy improves healing in chronic ulcers. In diabetic foot ulcers there is tentative evidence of benefit. A Cochrane review of methods for the debridement of venous leg ulcers found maggot therapy to be broadly as effective as most other methods, but the study also noted that the quality of data was poor.

In 2003, the United States Food and Drug Administration (FDA) cleared maggots from the common green bottle fly for use as a "medical device" in the US for the purpose of treatment of:

- Non-healing necrotic skin and soft tissue wounds
- Pressure ulcers
- Venous stasis ulcers
- Neuropathic foot ulcers
- Non-healing traumatic or post-surgical wounds

=== Limitations ===
The wound must be of a type that can benefit from the application of maggot therapy. A moist, exudating wound with sufficient oxygen supply is a prerequisite. Not all wound-types are suitable: wounds which are dry, or open wounds of body cavities do not provide a good environment for maggots to feed. In some cases it may be possible to make a dry wound suitable for larval therapy by moistening it with saline soaks.

Patients and doctors may find maggots distasteful, although studies have shown that this does not cause patients to refuse the offer of maggot therapy. Maggots can be enclosed in opaque polymer bags to hide them from sight. Dressings must be designed to prevent any maggots from escaping, while allowing air to get to the maggots. Dressings are also designed to minimize the uncomfortable tickling sensation that the maggots often cause.

== Mechanisms of action ==
The maggots have four principal actions:

- Debridement
- Disinfection of the wound
- Stimulation of healing
- Biofilm inhibition and eradication

=== Debridement ===
In maggot therapy, large numbers of small maggots consume necrotic tissue far more precisely than is possible in a normal surgical operation, and can debride a wound in a day or two. The area of a wound's surface is typically increased with the use of maggots due to the undebrided surface not revealing the actual underlying size of the wound. They derive nutrients through a process known as "extracorporeal digestion" by secreting a broad spectrum of proteolytic enzymes that liquefy necrotic tissue, and absorb the semi-liquid result within a few days. In an optimum wound environment maggots molt twice, increasing in length from about 2 mm to about 10 mm, and in girth, within a period of 48–72 hours by ingesting necrotic tissue, leaving a clean wound free of necrotic tissue when they are removed.

=== Disinfection ===
Secretions from maggots believed to have broad-spectrum antimicrobial activity include allantoin, urea, phenylacetic acid, phenylacetaldehyde, calcium carbonate, proteolytic enzymes, and many others. In vitro studies have shown that maggots inhibit and destroy a wide range of pathogenic bacteria including methicillin-resistant Staphylococcus aureus (MRSA), group A and B streptococci, and Gram-positive aerobic and anaerobic strains. Other bacteria like Pseudomonas aeruginosa, E. coli or Proteus spp. are not attacked by maggots, and in case of Pseudomonas even the maggots are in danger.

=== Biology of maggots ===
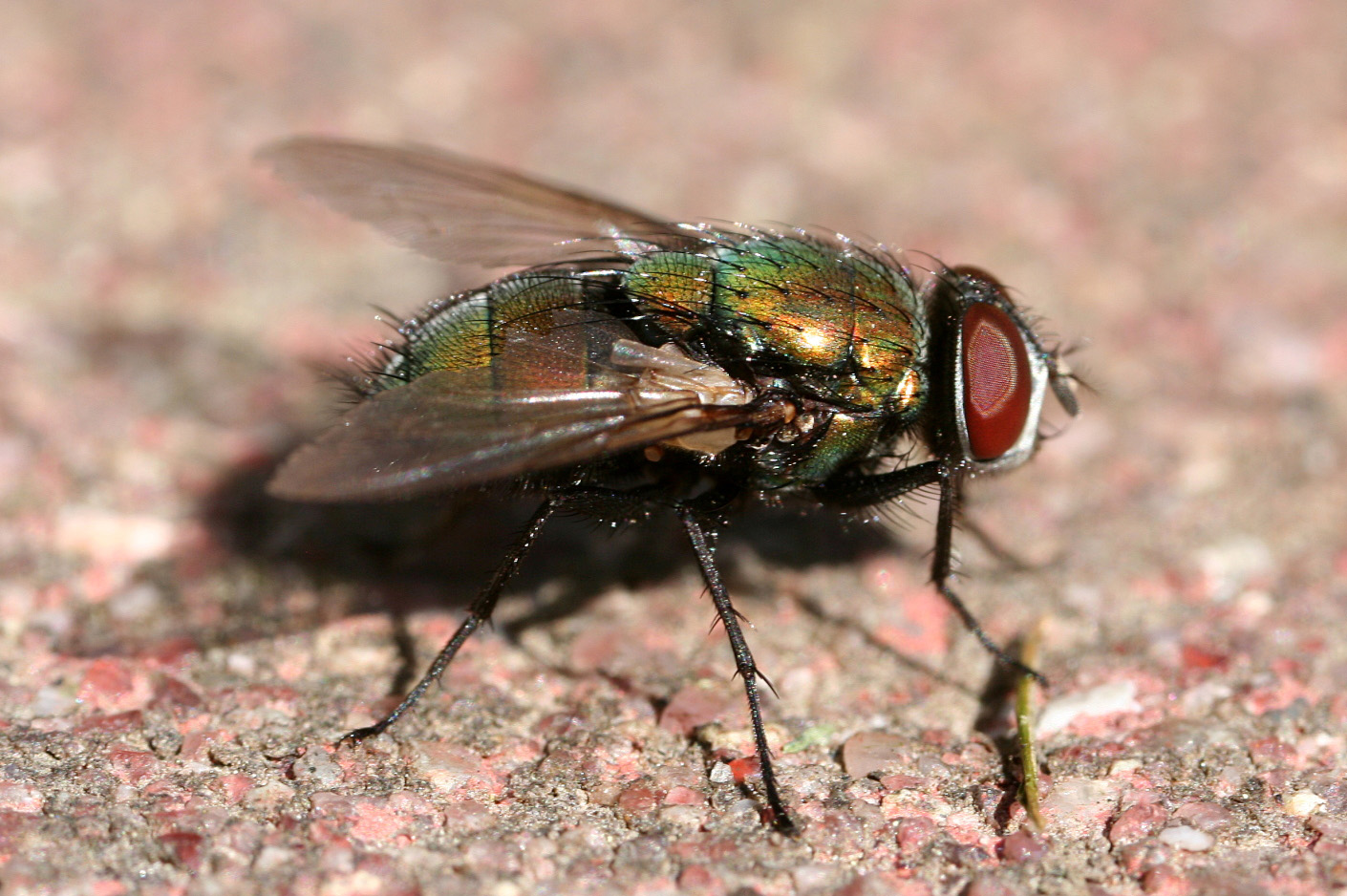
Lucilia sericata, green bottle fly

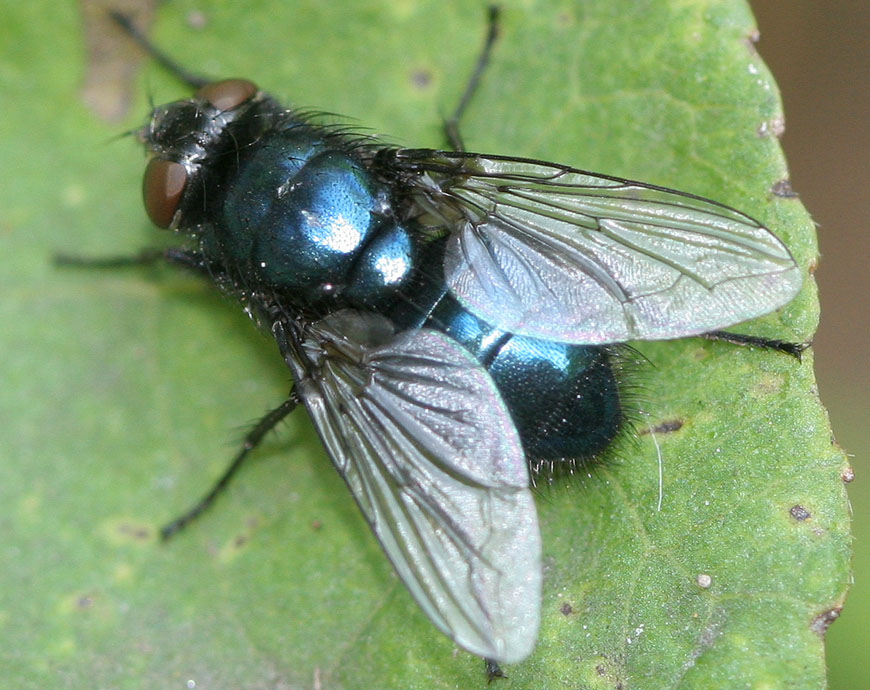
Protophormia terraenovae, northern blowfly

Those flies whose larvae feed on dead animals will sometimes lay their eggs on the dead parts (necrotic or gangrenous tissue) of living animals. The infestation by maggots of live animals is called myiasis. Some maggots will feed only on dead tissue, some only on live tissue, and some on live or dead tissue. The flies used most often for the purpose of maggot therapy are blow flies of the family Calliphoridae: the blow fly species used most commonly is Lucilia sericata, the common green bottle fly. Another important species, Protophormia terraenovae, is also notable for its feeding secretions, which combat infection by Streptococcus pyogenes and S. pneumoniae.

== History ==
Written records have documented that maggots have been used since antiquity as a wound treatment. There are reports of the use of maggots for wound healing by Maya, Native Americans, and Aboriginal Australians. Maggot treatment was reported in Renaissance times. Military physicians observed that soldiers whose wounds had become colonized with maggots experienced significantly less morbidity and mortality than soldiers whose wounds had not become colonized. These physicians included Napoleon's surgeon-general, Baron Dominique Larrey. Larrey reported during the French campaign in Egypt and Syria (1798–1801) that certain species of fly consumed only dead tissue and helped wounds to heal.

Joseph Jones, a ranking Confederate medical officer during the American Civil War, stated:

I have frequently seen neglected wounds ... filled with maggots ... as far as my experience extends, these worms eat only dead tissues, and do not injure specifically the well parts.

The first documented therapeutic use of maggots in the United States is credited to a second Confederate medical officer Dr. J.F. Zacharias, who reported during the American Civil War that:

Maggots in a single day would clean a wound much better than any agents we had at our command ... I am sure I saved many lives by their use.

He recorded a high survival rate in patients he treated with maggots.

During World War I, orthopedic surgeon William S. Baer recorded the case of a soldier left for several days on the battlefield who had sustained compound fractures of the femur and large flesh wounds. The soldier arrived at the hospital with maggots infesting his wounds but had no fever or other signs of infection and survived his injuries, which would normally have been fatal. After the war, Baer began using maggot therapy at Boston Children's Hospital in Massachusetts.

There were reports that American prisoners of war of the Japanese in World War II resorted to maggot therapy to treat severe wounds.

A survey of US Army doctors published in 2013 found that 10% of them had used maggot therapy.

== Regulation ==
In the US, in January 2004, the FDA granted permission to produce and market maggots for use in humans or animals as a prescription-only medical device for the following indications: "For debriding non-healing necrotic skin and soft tissue wounds, including pressure ulcers, venous stasis ulcers, neuropathic foot ulcers, and non-healing traumatic or post-surgical wounds."

Maggots supplied by an Australian company, MedMagLabs, have been used in humanitarian emergencies and conflict zone.

== Veterinary use ==
The use of maggots to clean dead tissue from animal wounds is part of folk medicine in many parts of the world. It is particularly helpful with chronic osteomyelitis, chronic ulcers, and other pus-producing infections that are frequently caused by chafing due to work equipment. Maggot therapy for horses in the United States was re-introduced after a study published in 2003 by veterinarian Dr. Scott Morrison. This therapy is used in horses for conditions such as osteomyelitis secondary to laminitis, sub-solar abscesses leading to osteomyelitis, post-surgical treatment of street-nail procedure for puncture wounds infecting the navicular bursa, canker, non-healing ulcers on the frog, and post-surgical site cleaning for keratoma removal.

However, there have not been many case studies done with maggot debridement therapy on animals, and as such it can be difficult to accurately assess how successful it is.
