= List of arthropods of Qatar =

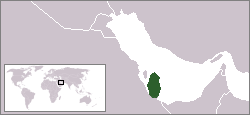
Location of Qatar

The arthropods of Qatar consist of many organisms including insects and arachnids, as well as myriapods and crustaceans recorded from Qatar.

== Class Insecta ==
=== Coleoptera ===
==== Anobiidae ====
- Lasidoerma serricorne

==== Buprestidae ====
- Chrysobothris parvipunctata (Obenberger, 1914)
- Julodis euphratica (Laporte & Gory, 1835)
- Psiloptera mimosae

==== Carabidae ====
- Anthia duodecimguttata
- Calosoma chlorostictum
- Calosoma imbricatum
- Cicindela melancholica

==== Cerambycidae ====
- Apomecyna lameerei

==== Cleridae ====
- Necrobia rufipes

==== Coccinellidae ====
- Cheilomenes sexmaculata (Fabricius, 1781)
- Coccinella septempunctata (Linnaeus, 1758)
- Coccinella undecimpunctata (Linnaeus, 1758)
- Hyperaspis vinciguerrae (Capra, 1929)
- Scymnus nubilus (Mulsant, 1850)

==== Dytiscidae ====
- Eretes sticiticus

==== Geotrupidae ====
- Pseudoathyerus orientalis (Laporte, 1840)

==== Glaresidae ====
- Glaresis arabica (Paulian, 1980)

==== Hybosoridae ====
- Brenskea coronata Reitter, 1891
- Hybosorus roei Westwood, 1845

==== Scarabaeidae ====
- Labarrus lividus (Olivier, 1789)
- Maladera insanabilis (Brenske, 1894)
- Oryctes agamemnon (Burmeister, 1847)
- Oryctes elegans (Prell, 1914)
- Pentodon algerinus dispar (Fuessly, 1788)
- Pentodon bispinosus
- Phylloganthus cristatus
- Scarabaeus bannuensis (Janssens, 1940)
- Scarabaeus sacer
- Stalagmopygus albella

==== Silvanidae ====
- Oryzaephilus surinamensis

==== Tenebrionidae ====
- Gonocephalum rusticum
- Gonocephalum setulosum
- Mesostena angustata
- Mesostena elegans
- Ocnera hispida
- Ocnera philistina
- Opatroides punctulatus
- Tribolium confusum

==== Trogidae ====
- Afromorgus gemmatus (A.G. Olivier, 1789)

=== Diptera ===
==== Calliphoridae ====
- Calliphora vicina (Robineau-Desvoidy, 1830)
- Chrysomya albiceps (Wiedemann, 1819)
- Chrysomya marginalis (Wiedemann, 1830)
- Chrysomya megacephala (Fabricius, 1794)
- Lucilia sericata (Meigen, 1826)

==== Muscidae ====
- Coenosia attenuata (Stein, 1903)
- Coenosia tigrina (Fabricius, 1775)
- Musca albina (Wiedemann, 1830)
- Musca domestica (Linnaeus, 1758)
- Musca sorbens (Wiedemann, 1830)
- Stomoxys calcitrans (Linnaeus, 1758)

==== Tabanidae ====
- Tabanus sufis (Jaennicke, 1867)

=== Lepidoptera ===
List of Lepidoptera of Qatar

=== Lepismatidae ===
- Lepisma saccharina (Linnaeus, 1758)
- Thermobia aegyptiaca (Lucas, 1840)
- Thermobia domestica (Packard, 1873)
