= Neodexiopsis ovata =

Scientific classification
- Kingdom: Animalia
- Phylum: Arthropoda
- Clade: Pancrustacea
- Class: Insecta
- Order: Diptera
- Family: Muscidae
- Tribe: Coenosiini
- Genus: Neodexiopsis
- Species: N. ovata

Binomial name
- Neodexiopsis ovata (Stein, 1898)

Synonyms
- Coenosia ovata Stein, 1898

Species of fly

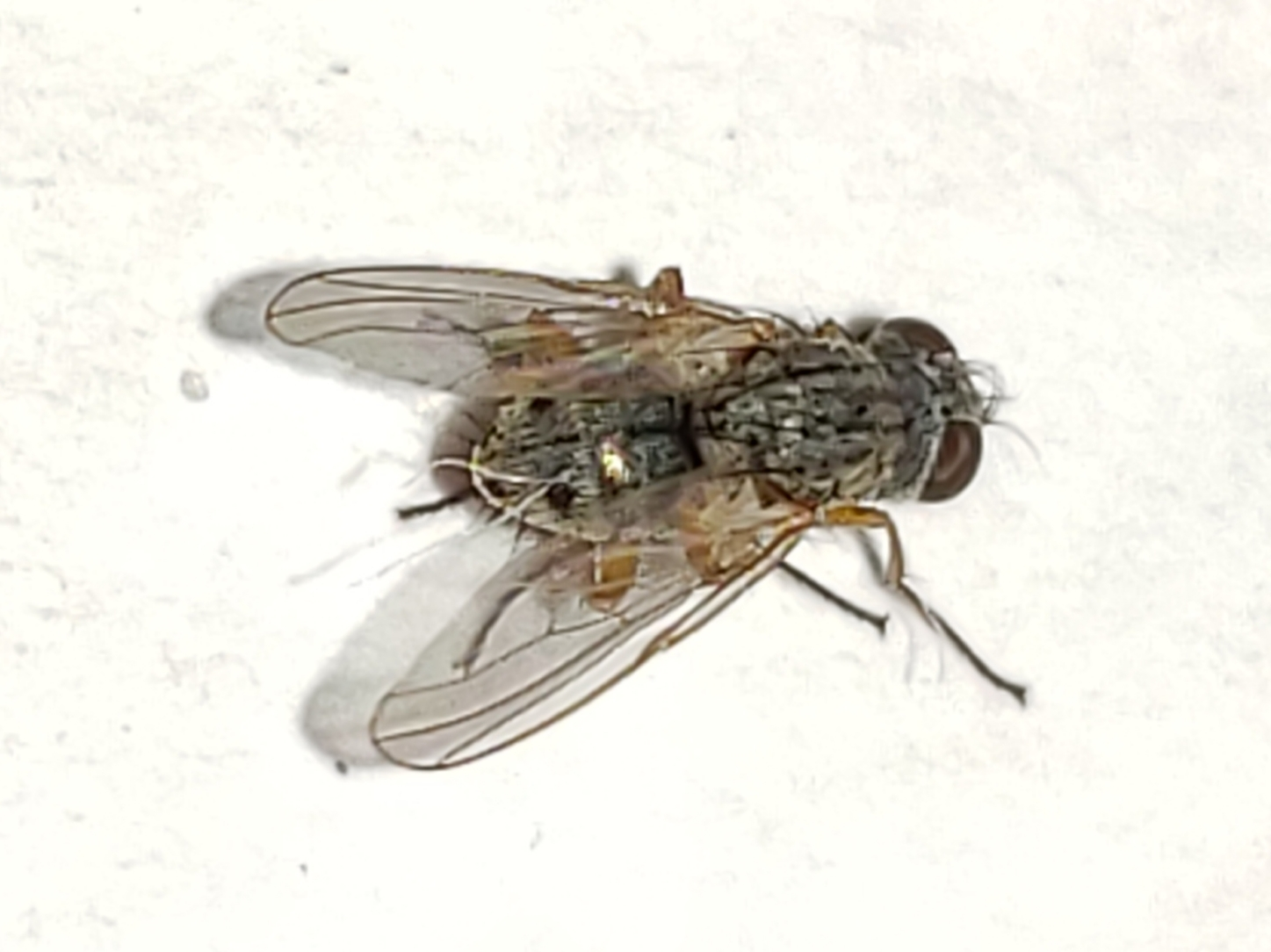
Neodexiopsis ovata in Tampa, Florida

Neodexiopsis ovata is a species of house flies, etc. in the family Muscidae.
