= Coenosia lata =

Scientific classification
- Domain: Eukaryota
- Kingdom: Animalia
- Phylum: Arthropoda
- Class: Insecta
- Order: Diptera
- Family: Muscidae
- Tribe: Coenosiini
- Genus: Coenosia
- Species: C. lata

Binomial name
- Coenosia lata Walker, 1853

Synonyms
- Coenosia hypopygialis Stein, 1898; Coenosia intricata Huckett, 1934

Species of fly

Coenosia lata is a species in the family Muscidae.
