= Labarrus splendidus =

Scientific classification
- Kingdom: Animalia
- Phylum: Arthropoda
- Clade: Pancrustacea
- Class: Insecta
- Order: Coleoptera
- Suborder: Polyphaga
- Infraorder: Scarabaeiformia
- Family: Scarabaeidae
- Genus: Labarrus
- Species: L. splendidus

Binomial name
- Labarrus splendidus (Petrovitz, 1955)

Synonyms
- Nialus splendidus Petrovitz, 1955

Species of beetle

Labarrus splendidus is a species of beetle of the family Scarabaeidae. It is found in Afghanistan, Iran, Iraq, Egypt, Qatar, Pakistan and Saudi Arabia.

== Description ==
Adults reach a length of about 4.8–5.7 mm (0.19–0.22 in). They are very similar to Labarrus digitatus, but the anterior part of the body is highly lustrous, with a yellowish-brown dorsal surface.
