= Bithoracochaeta leucoprocta =

Scientific classification
- Domain: Eukaryota
- Kingdom: Animalia
- Phylum: Arthropoda
- Class: Insecta
- Order: Diptera
- Family: Muscidae
- Tribe: Coenosiini
- Genus: Bithoracochaeta
- Species: B. leucoprocta

Binomial name
- Bithoracochaeta leucoprocta (Wiedemann, 1830)

Synonyms
- Anthomyia despecta Walker, 1853; Anthomyia leucoprocta Wiedemann, 1830; Caricea insignis Stein, 1898; Caricea multiplicata Stein, 1901; Caricea praeterita Stein, 1901; Coenosia antica Walker, 1853

Species of fly

Bithoracochaeta leucoprocta is a species of house flies, etc. in the family Muscidae.
