= Coenosia nivea =

Scientific classification
- Domain: Eukaryota
- Kingdom: Animalia
- Phylum: Arthropoda
- Class: Insecta
- Order: Diptera
- Family: Muscidae
- Tribe: Coenosiini
- Genus: Coenosia
- Species: C. nivea

Binomial name
- Coenosia nivea Loew, 1872

Synonyms
- Coenosia brunnescens Malloch, 1920

Species of fly

Coenosia nivea is a species of house flies, etc. in the family Muscidae.
