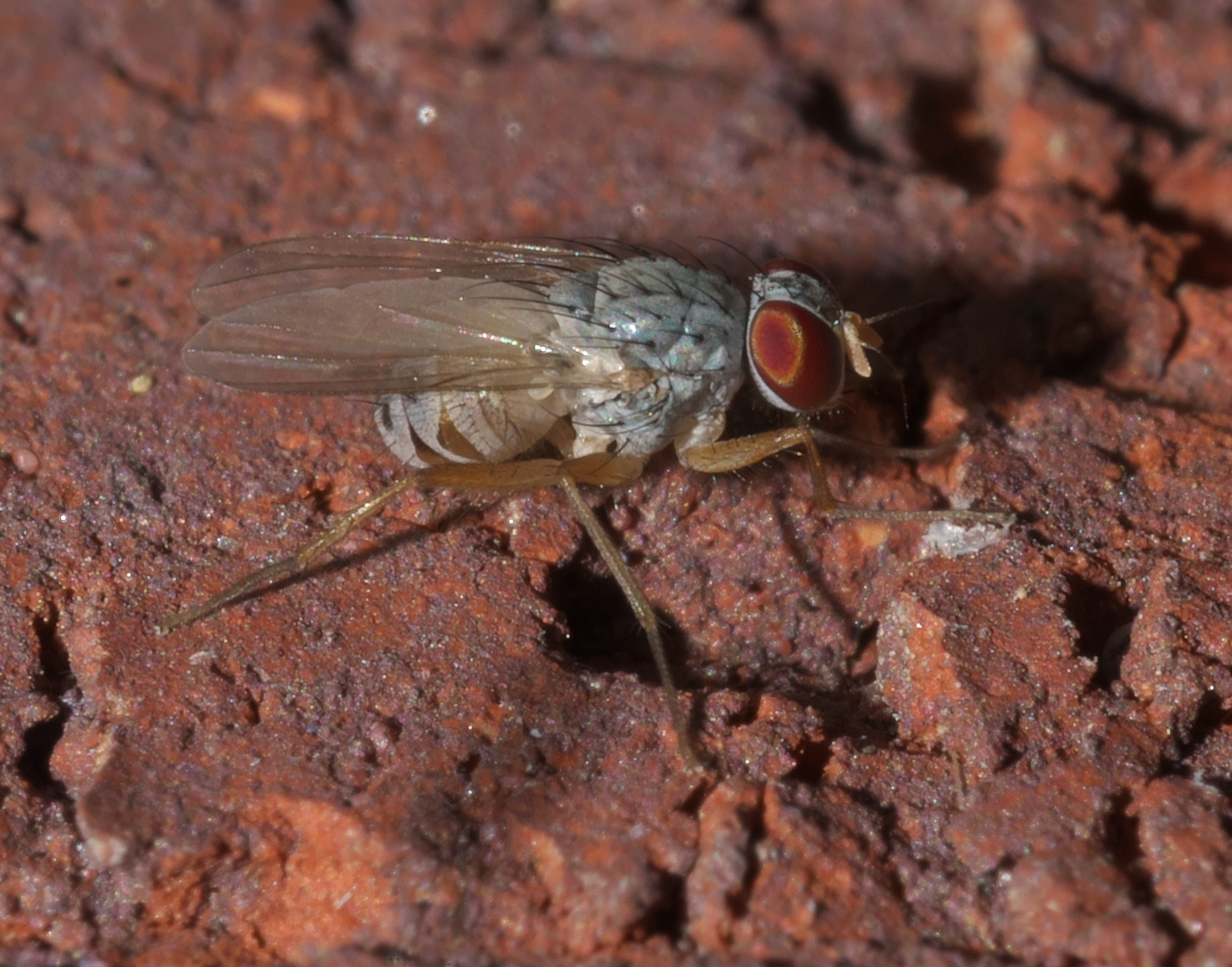
- Neodexiopsis calopyga, Oklahoma

Scientific classification
- Kingdom: Animalia
- Phylum: Arthropoda
- Clade: Pancrustacea
- Class: Insecta
- Order: Diptera
- Family: Muscidae
- Tribe: Coenosiini
- Genus: Neodexiopsis
- Species: N. calopyga

Binomial name
- Neodexiopsis calopyga (Loew, 1872)

Synonyms
- Coenosia calopyga Loew, 1872

= Neodexiopsis calopyga =

Species of fly

Neodexiopsis calopyga is a species of house fly in the family Muscidae.
