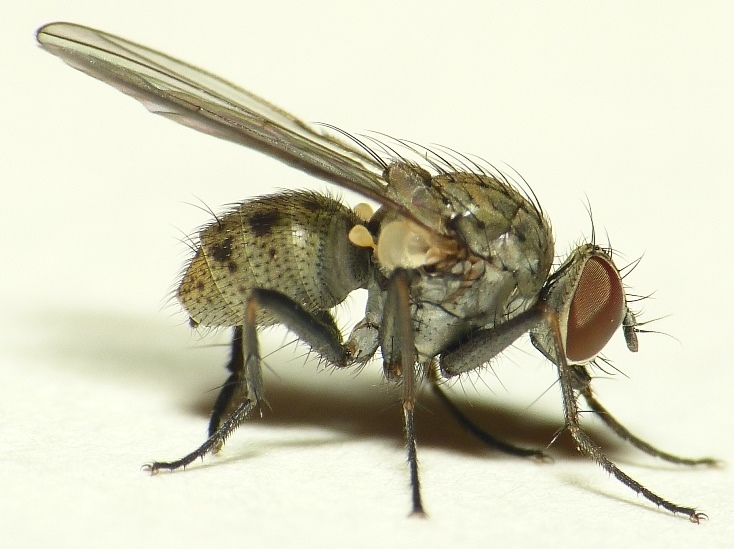

Scientific classification
- Domain: Eukaryota
- Kingdom: Animalia
- Phylum: Arthropoda
- Class: Insecta
- Order: Diptera
- Family: Muscidae
- Tribe: Coenosiini
- Genus: Coenosia
- Species: C. humilis

Binomial name
- Coenosia humilis Meigen, 1826

Synonyms
- Anthomyza nana Zetterstedt, 1845

= Coenosia humilis =

Species of fly

Coenosia humilis, a tiger fly (genus Coenosia), is a species of house flies, etc. in the family Muscidae. It is found in Europe.
