= Neodexiopsis major =

Scientific classification
- Domain: Eukaryota
- Kingdom: Animalia
- Phylum: Arthropoda
- Class: Insecta
- Order: Diptera
- Family: Muscidae
- Tribe: Coenosiini
- Genus: Neodexiopsis
- Species: N. major

Binomial name
- Neodexiopsis major (Malloch, 1920)

Synonyms
- Xenocoenosia major Malloch, 1920

Species of fly

Neodexiopsis major is a species of house flies, etc. in the family Muscidae.
