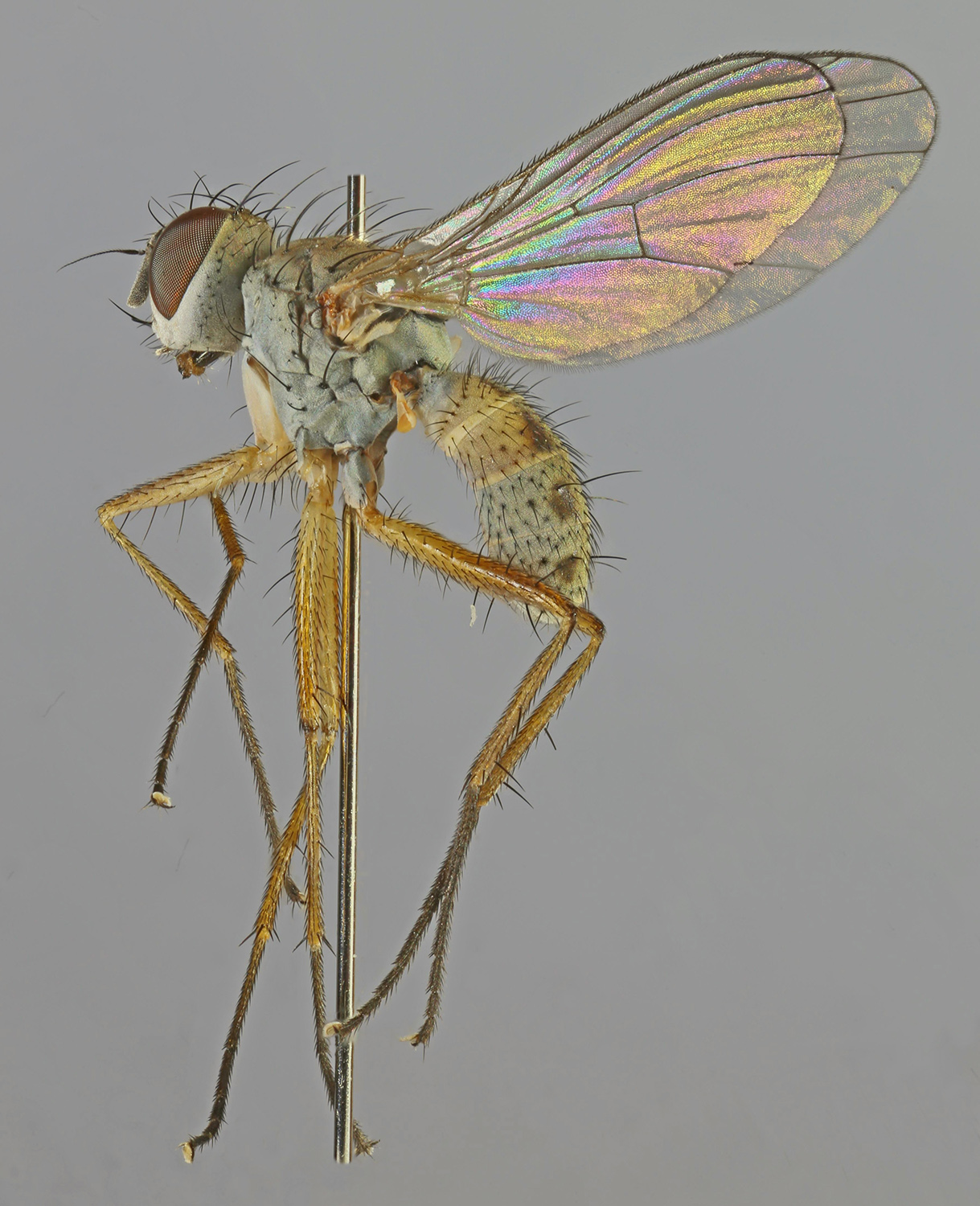
- Coenosia testacea North Wales

Scientific classification
- Kingdom: Animalia
- Phylum: Arthropoda
- Class: Insecta
- Order: Diptera
- Family: Muscidae
- Genus: Coenosia
- Species: C. testacea

Binomial name
- Coenosia testacea (Robineau-Desvoidy, 1830)

= Coenosia testacea =

Species of fly

Coenosia testacea is a species of fly in the family Muscidae. It is found in the Palearctic.
