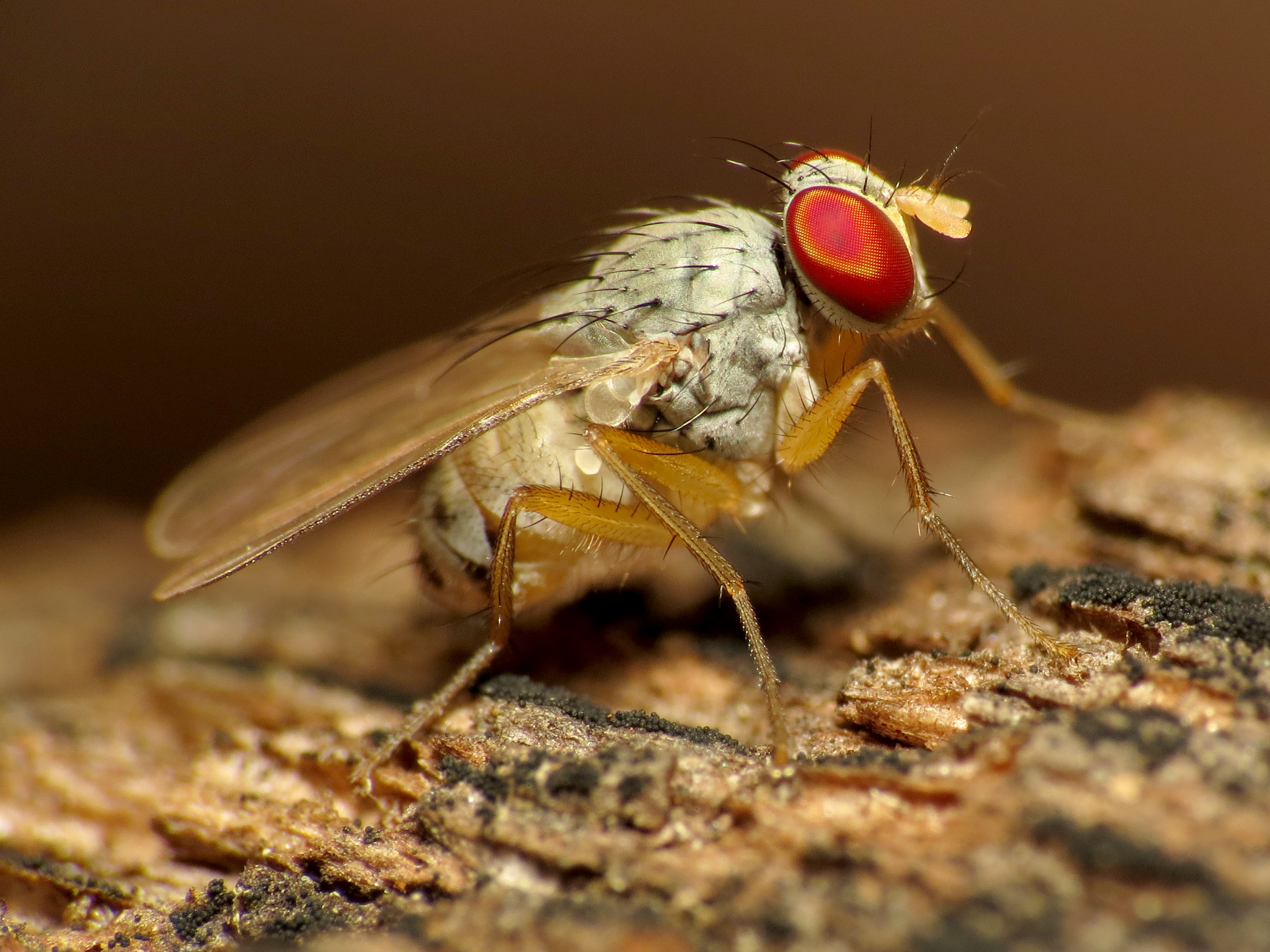

Scientific classification
- Kingdom: Animalia
- Phylum: Arthropoda
- Class: Insecta
- Order: Diptera
- Family: Muscidae
- Subfamily: Coenosiinae
- Tribe: Coenosiini
- Genus: Neodexiopsis; Malloch, 1920

= Neodexiopsis =

Genus of flies

Neodexiopsis is a genus of house flies, insects in the family Muscidae. There are at least 80 described species in Neodexiopsis.

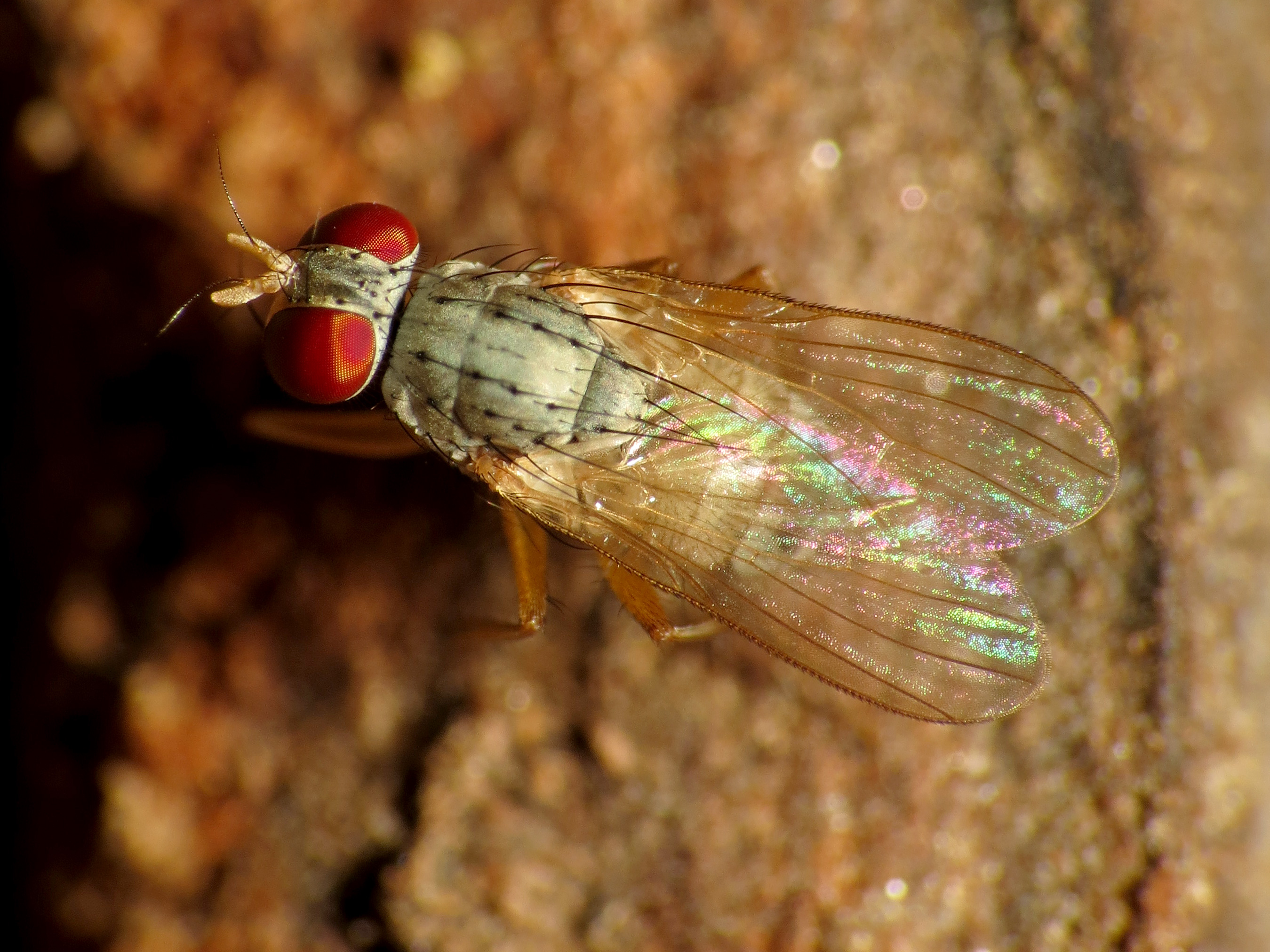

== Species ==
These 89 species belong to the genus Neodexiopsis:

- Neodexiopsis alacris Couri & Albuquerque, 1979^{c g}
- Neodexiopsis antennata Couri, 1987^{c g}
- Neodexiopsis arizona Snyder, 1958^{i c g}
- Neodexiopsis barbiventris Couri & Albuquerque, 1979^{c g}
- Neodexiopsis basalis (Stein, 1898)^{i c g}
- Neodexiopsis borea Snyder, 1958^{i c g}
- Neodexiopsis brasiliensis (Walker, 1853)^{c g}
- Neodexiopsis brevicornis (Malloch, 1934)^{c}
- Neodexiopsis cacumina Snyder, 1957^{c g}
- Neodexiopsis calopyga (Loew, 1872)^{i c g b}
- Neodexiopsis cavalata Snyder, 1957^{c g}
- Neodexiopsis cera Snyder, 1958^{c g}
- Neodexiopsis cinerea Costacurta, Couri & Carvalho, 2005^{c g}
- Neodexiopsis cirratipila Snyder, 1957^{c g}
- Neodexiopsis clavacula Snyder, 1957^{c g}
- Neodexiopsis crassicrurus Snyder, 1957^{c g}
- Neodexiopsis crispiseta Snyder, 1957^{c g}
- Neodexiopsis croceafrons Snyder, 1957^{c g}
- Neodexiopsis declivis (Stein, 1904)^{c g}
- Neodexiopsis devia (Curran, 1934)^{c}
- Neodexiopsis discolorisexus Snyder, 1957^{c g}
- Neodexiopsis ditiportus Snyder, 1957^{c g}
- Neodexiopsis ebenifemus Snyder, 1957^{c g}
- Neodexiopsis emmesa (Malloch, 1934)^{c g}
- Neodexiopsis equator Snyder, 1958^{c g}
- Neodexiopsis erecta Costacurta, Couri & Carvalho, 2005^{c g}
- Neodexiopsis facilis Costacurta, Couri & Carvalho, 2005^{c g}
- Neodexiopsis flavipalis Albuquerque, 1956^{c g}
- Neodexiopsis flavipes (Williston, 1896)^{c g}
- Neodexiopsis floridensis (Malloch, 1920)^{i c g}
- Neodexiopsis fulvifrontis Couri & Albuquerque, 1979^{c g}
- Neodexiopsis geniculata (Bigot, 1885)^{c g}
- Neodexiopsis genupuncta (Stein, 1904)^{c g}
- Neodexiopsis hilaris (Huckett, 1966)^{i c g}
- Neodexiopsis hydrotaeiformis Snyder, 1958^{c g}
- Neodexiopsis intoniclunis Snyder, 1957^{c g}
- Neodexiopsis lanigera (Stein, 1918)^{c g}
- Neodexiopsis latifrons (Thomson, 1869)^{c g}
- Neodexiopsis legitima Costacurta, Couri & Carvalho, 2005^{c g}
- Neodexiopsis lineata (Stein, 1904)^{c}
- Neodexiopsis longipilis (Albuquerque, 1954)^{c g}
- Neodexiopsis lunatisigna Snyder, 1957^{c g}
- Neodexiopsis macrocera (Wulp, 1896)^{i c g}
- Neodexiopsis magnicornis Snyder, 1958^{c g}
- Neodexiopsis major (Malloch, 1920)^{i c g b}
- Neodexiopsis maldonadoi Snyder, 1957^{c g}
- Neodexiopsis micans Snyder, 1957^{c g}
- Neodexiopsis microchaeta (Malloch, 1934)^{c g}
- Neodexiopsis neoaustralis Snyder, 1957^{c g}
- Neodexiopsis neoflavipes Snyder, 1957^{c g}
- Neodexiopsis neomacrocera Snyder, 1957^{c g}
- Neodexiopsis novissimum Couri & Albuquerque, 1979^{c g}
- Neodexiopsis obtusilora (Malloch, 1934)^{c g}
- Neodexiopsis oculata (Stein, 1911)^{c g}
- Neodexiopsis oscillans (Wulp, 1896)^{c g}
- Neodexiopsis ovata (Stein, 1898)^{i c g b}
- Neodexiopsis paranaensis Costacurta, Couri & Carvalho, 2005^{c g}
- Neodexiopsis parvula Albuquerque, 1958^{c g}
- Neodexiopsis paulistensis Albuquerque, 1956^{c g}
- Neodexiopsis pectinata Couri & Albuquerque, 1979^{c g}
- Neodexiopsis pectoralis (Huckett, 1934)^{i c g}
- Neodexiopsis peninsula Snyder, 1958^{i c g}
- Neodexiopsis peruviana Snyder, 1958^{c g}
- Neodexiopsis pilosa (Stein, 1904)^{c g}
- Neodexiopsis ponti Couri, 1987^{c g}
- Neodexiopsis preacuta Snyder, 1958^{c g}
- Neodexiopsis priscipagus Snyder, 1958^{c g}
- Neodexiopsis punctulata (Wulp, 1896)^{i c g}
- Neodexiopsis pura Costacurta, Couri & Carvalho, 2005^{c g}
- Neodexiopsis quintivena Snyder, 1957^{c g}
- Neodexiopsis rara Costacurta, Couri & Carvalho, 2005^{c g}
- Neodexiopsis rava Snyder, 1957^{c g}
- Neodexiopsis recedens (Stein, 1904)^{c g}
- Neodexiopsis rex Curran, 1928^{c g}
- Neodexiopsis rufitibia (Stein, 1919)^{i c g}
- Neodexiopsis setilamina (Huckett, 1966)^{i c g}
- Neodexiopsis setipuncta Snyder, 1957^{c g}
- Neodexiopsis sima Snyder, 1957^{c g}
- Neodexiopsis similis Costacurta, Couri & Carvalho, 2005^{c g}
- Neodexiopsis simplicissima Pont, 1988^{i g}
- Neodexiopsis subtilis Couri & Albuquerque, 1979^{c g}
- Neodexiopsis sulina Couri, 1987^{c g}
- Neodexiopsis tenuicornis (Wulp, 1896)^{c g}
- Neodexiopsis uber Costacurta, Couri & Carvalho, 2005^{c g}
- Neodexiopsis uspallata Snyder, 1957^{c g}
- Neodexiopsis vitilis (Giglio-Tos, 1894)^{c g}
- Neodexiopsis vittiventris (Albuquerque, 1955)^{c g}
- Neodexiopsis vulgaris Couri & Albuquerque, 1979^{c g}
- Neodexiopsis willistoni Snyder, 1958^{c g}

Data sources: i = ITIS, c = Catalogue of Life, g = GBIF, b = Bugguide.net
