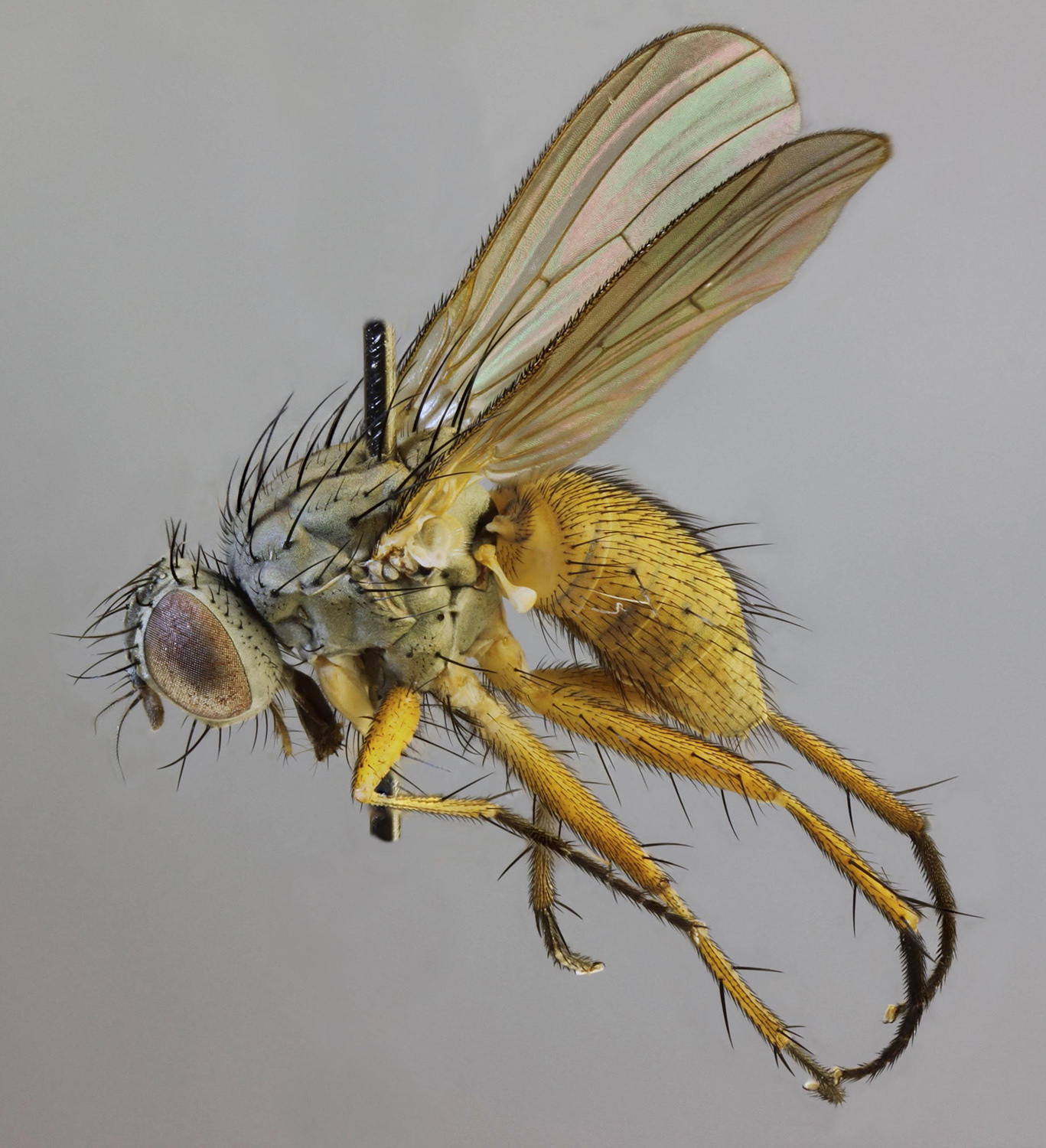
- Coenosia mollicula North Wales

Scientific classification
- Kingdom: Animalia
- Phylum: Arthropoda
- Class: Insecta
- Order: Diptera
- Family: Muscidae
- Genus: Coenosia
- Species: C. mollicula

Binomial name
- Coenosia mollicula (Fallen, 1825)

= Coenosia mollicula =

Species of fly

Coenosia mollicula is a species of fly in the family Muscidae. It is found in the Palearctic.
