= Labarrus hoabinhensis =

Scientific classification
- Kingdom: Animalia
- Phylum: Arthropoda
- Clade: Pancrustacea
- Class: Insecta
- Order: Coleoptera
- Suborder: Polyphaga
- Infraorder: Scarabaeiformia
- Family: Scarabaeidae
- Genus: Labarrus
- Species: L. hoabinhensis

Binomial name
- Labarrus hoabinhensis (Balthasar, 1946)

Synonyms
- Aphodius hoabinhensis Balthasar 1946; Aphodius insularis Petrovitz, 1961; Afrodiastictus insularis (Petrovitz, 1969)

Species of beetle

Labarrus hoabinhensis, is a species of dung beetle found throughout the Oriental Region from the countries Bhutan, India (Goa, Rajasthan), Nepal, the Philippines, Sri Lanka, Thailand and Vietnam.

== Description ==
Adults reach a length of about 3.8–4 mm (0.15–0.16 in). They have an elongate, fairly parallel-sided, highly convex, strongly shining, glabrous, light yellowish-brown body, with the head, the markings on the pronotal disc and the scutellum dark brown. The elytra are yellowish-brown, with the sutural interval darker and each with a large, diffuse spot. The underside and legs are yellowish-brown.
