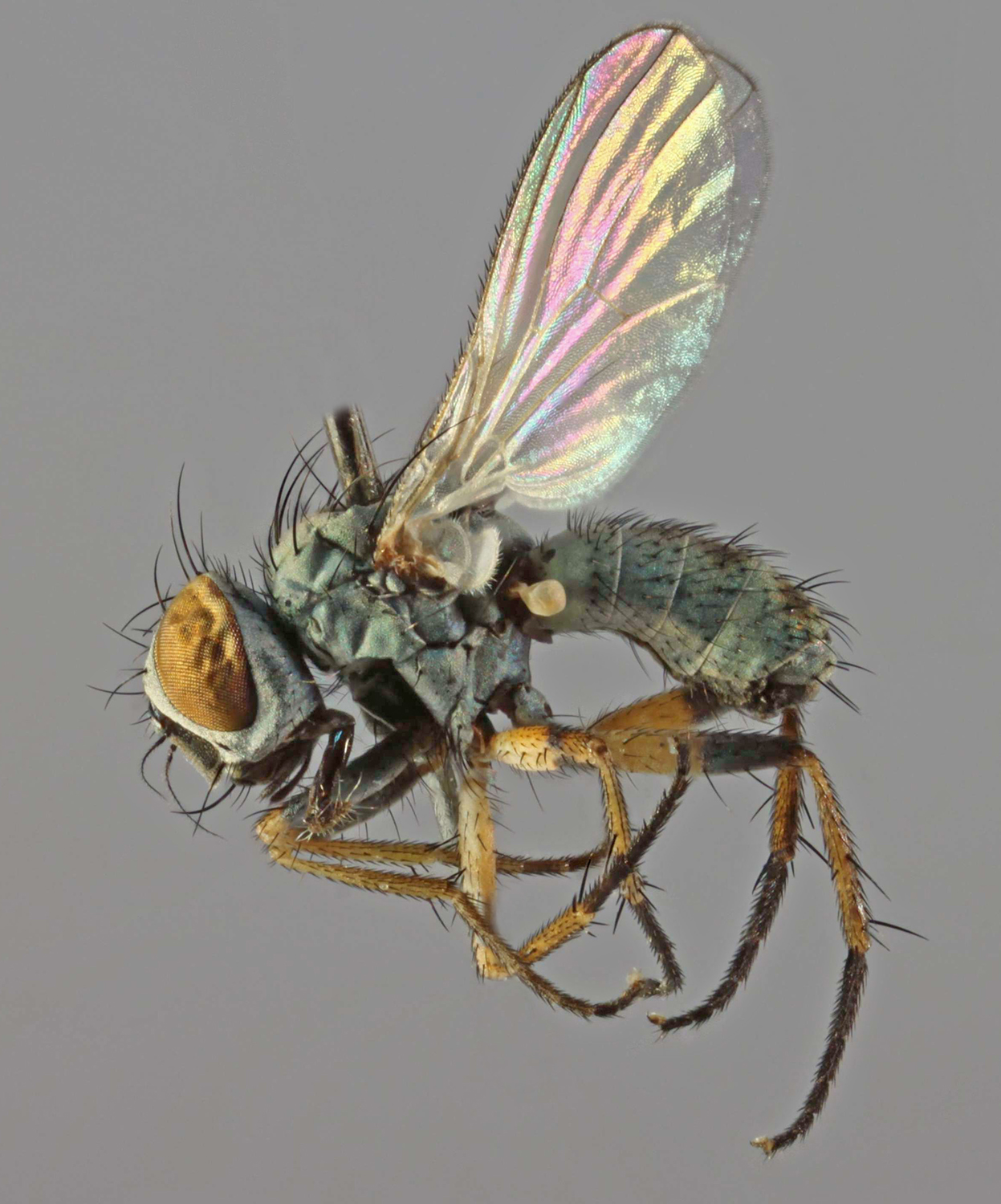
- Coenosia verralli North Wales

Scientific classification
- Kingdom: Animalia
- Phylum: Arthropoda
- Class: Insecta
- Order: Diptera
- Family: Muscidae
- Genus: Coenosia
- Species: C. verralli

Binomial name
- Coenosia verralli Collin, 1953

= Coenosia verralli =

Species of fly

Coenosia verralli is a species of fly in the family Muscidae. It is found in the Palearctic. The name honours George Henry Verrall
