= Labarrus sublimbatus =

Scientific classification
- Kingdom: Animalia
- Phylum: Arthropoda
- Clade: Pancrustacea
- Class: Insecta
- Order: Coleoptera
- Suborder: Polyphaga
- Infraorder: Scarabaeiformia
- Family: Scarabaeidae
- Genus: Labarrus
- Species: L. sublimbatus

Binomial name
- Labarrus sublimbatus (Motschulsky, 1860)

Synonyms
- Chilothorax sublimbatus Motschulsky, 1860; Aphodius (Calamosternus) ussuriensis Petrovitz, 1961; Aphodius pallidicinctus Waterhouse, 1875

Species of beetle

Labarrus sublimbatus is a species of beetle of the family Scarabaeidae. It is found in China (Heilongjiang, Jilin, Nei Mongol, Ningxia), Japan, Korea, the Russian Far East, Siberia, Taiwan and Thailand.

== Description ==
Adults reach a length of about 3.8–5 mm (0.15–0.20 in). They have a quite strongly convex, shiny, glabrous body. The head and pronotum are dark brown, with the anterior margin of the former reddish, while the sides of the pronotum are yellow with a dark spot. The scutellum is dark and the elytra are yellow-brown with a dark sutural interval and a dark patch. The legs are brown.

== Life history ==
Specimens have been collected from cow and sheep dung.
