= Labarrus nabeleki =

Scientific classification
- Kingdom: Animalia
- Phylum: Arthropoda
- Clade: Pancrustacea
- Class: Insecta
- Order: Coleoptera
- Suborder: Polyphaga
- Infraorder: Scarabaeiformia
- Family: Scarabaeidae
- Genus: Labarrus
- Species: L. nabeleki

Binomial name
- Labarrus nabeleki (Balthasar, 1936)

Synonyms
- Aphodius (Calamosternus) nabeleki Balthasar, 1936

Species of beetle

Labarrus nabeleki is a species of beetle of the family Scarabaeidae. It is found in China (Shandong).

== Description ==
Adults reach a length of about 3.5 mm (0.14 in). They have a nearly parallel-sided, shining, glabrous, yellow to light yellowish-brown body, with the margin of the clypeus, the disc of the pronotum and the scutellum darker brown. The sutural interval of the elytra is darkened and the legs are yellowish-brown.
