= Coenosia atrata =

Scientific classification
- Kingdom: Animalia
- Phylum: Arthropoda
- Class: Insecta
- Order: Diptera
- Family: Muscidae
- Genus: Coenosia
- Species: C. atrata

Binomial name
- Coenosia atrata Walker, 1853

Synonyms
- Coenosia canescens Stein, 1898; Coenosia illata Stein, 1901

Species of fly

Coenosia atrata is a species of fly in the family Muscidae.
