= Labarrus pseudolividus =

Scientific classification
- Kingdom: Animalia
- Phylum: Arthropoda
- Clade: Pancrustacea
- Class: Insecta
- Order: Coleoptera
- Suborder: Polyphaga
- Infraorder: Scarabaeiformia
- Family: Scarabaeidae
- Genus: Labarrus
- Species: L. pseudolividus

Binomial name
- Labarrus pseudolividus (Balthasar, 1941)

Synonyms
- Aphodius (Nialus) pseudolividus Balthasar, 1941; Aphodius cinticulus Hope, 1847

Species of beetle

Labarrus pseudolividus is a species of beetle of the family Scarabaeidae.

== Description ==
Adults reach a length of about 3.5–5.2 mm (0.14–0.20 in). The clypeus and frons are punctate with small and close punctures and the clypeus has weak emargination.

== Distribution ==
Nearctic: USA (Arizona, California, Colorado, Florida, Hawai, Iowa, Kansas, Louisiana, Maryland, Nevada, North Carolina, South Carolina). Neotropical: Argentina, Bolivia, Brazil (Alagoas, Bahia, Distrito Federal, Goiás, Maranhão, Mato Grosso, Mato Grosso do Sul, Minas Gerais, Paraná, Rio de Janeiro, Rio Grande do Sul, São Paulo, Tocantins), Chile, Colombia, Costa Rica, Ecuador, Guatemala, Mexico (Aguascalientes, Distrito Federal, Chihuahua, Coahuila, Durango, Guanajuato, Guerrero, Hidalgo, México, Michoacán, Morelos, Nayarit, Oaxaca, Puebla, Querétaro, Sonora, Tabasco, Tamaulipas, Tlaxcala, Veracruz, Yucatán), Panama, Paraguay, Peru, Puerto Rico, Suriname, Uruguay, Venezuela. Australia: Western Australia, Oceania, New Zealand. Afrotropical: Angola, Botswana, Chad, Kenya, Malawi, Mozambique, Namibia, Democratic Republic of the Congo, Republic of the Congo, South Africa (KwaZulu-Natal, Cape, Orange Free State), Senegal, Somalia, Tanzania, Uganda, Zambia, Zimbabwe, Madagascar, the Seychelles.

== Life history ==
They are found in open areas such as grasslands and soy crops or in areas of secondary forest. Specimens have been collected in bovine, human, pig, horse and Tapirus feces.
