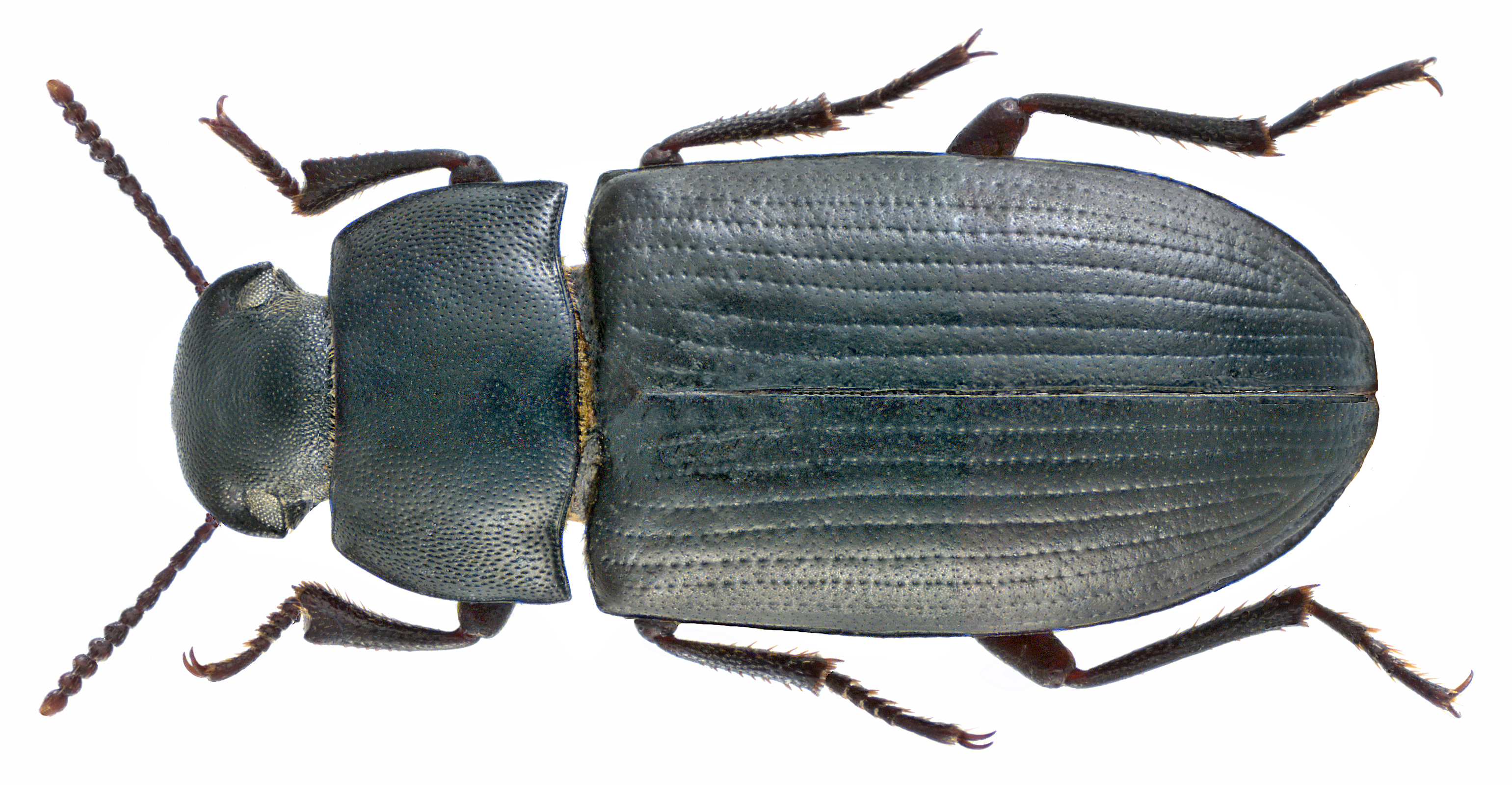
- Opatroides punctulatus

Scientific classification
- Domain: Eukaryota
- Kingdom: Animalia
- Phylum: Arthropoda
- Class: Insecta
- Order: Coleoptera
- Suborder: Polyphaga
- Infraorder: Cucujiformia
- Family: Tenebrionidae
- Tribe: Opatrini
- Genus: Opatroides; Brulle, 1832

= Opatroides =

Genus of beetles

Opatroides is a genus of darkling beetles in the family Tenebrionidae. There are at least three described species in Opatroides.

== Species ==
These three species belong to the genus Opatroides:

- Opatroides punctulatus Brull, 1832^{g b}
- Opatroides thoracicus (Rosenhauer, 1856)^{g}
- Opatroides vicinus Fairmaire, 1896^{g}

Data sources: i = ITIS, c = Catalogue of Life, g = GBIF, b = Bugguide.net
