= Labarrus translucidus =

Scientific classification
- Kingdom: Animalia
- Phylum: Arthropoda
- Clade: Pancrustacea
- Class: Insecta
- Order: Coleoptera
- Suborder: Polyphaga
- Infraorder: Scarabaeiformia
- Family: Scarabaeidae
- Genus: Labarrus
- Species: L. translucidus

Binomial name
- Labarrus translucidus (Petrovitz, 1961)

Synonyms
- Aphodius (Nialus) translucidus Petrovitz, 1961

Species of beetle

Labarrus translucidus is a species of beetle of the family Scarabaeidae. It is found in Afghanistan, India (Uttarakhand), Iraq, Iran, Oman, Pakistan, Russia, Saudi Arabia, Turkmenistan and the United Arab Emirates.

== Description ==
Adults reach a length of about 4–4.5 mm (0.16–0.18 in). They are brownish-yellow and translucent, with the margins of the scutellum and the suture of the elytra dark brown. The clypeus and most of the pronotum are light reddish-brown.
