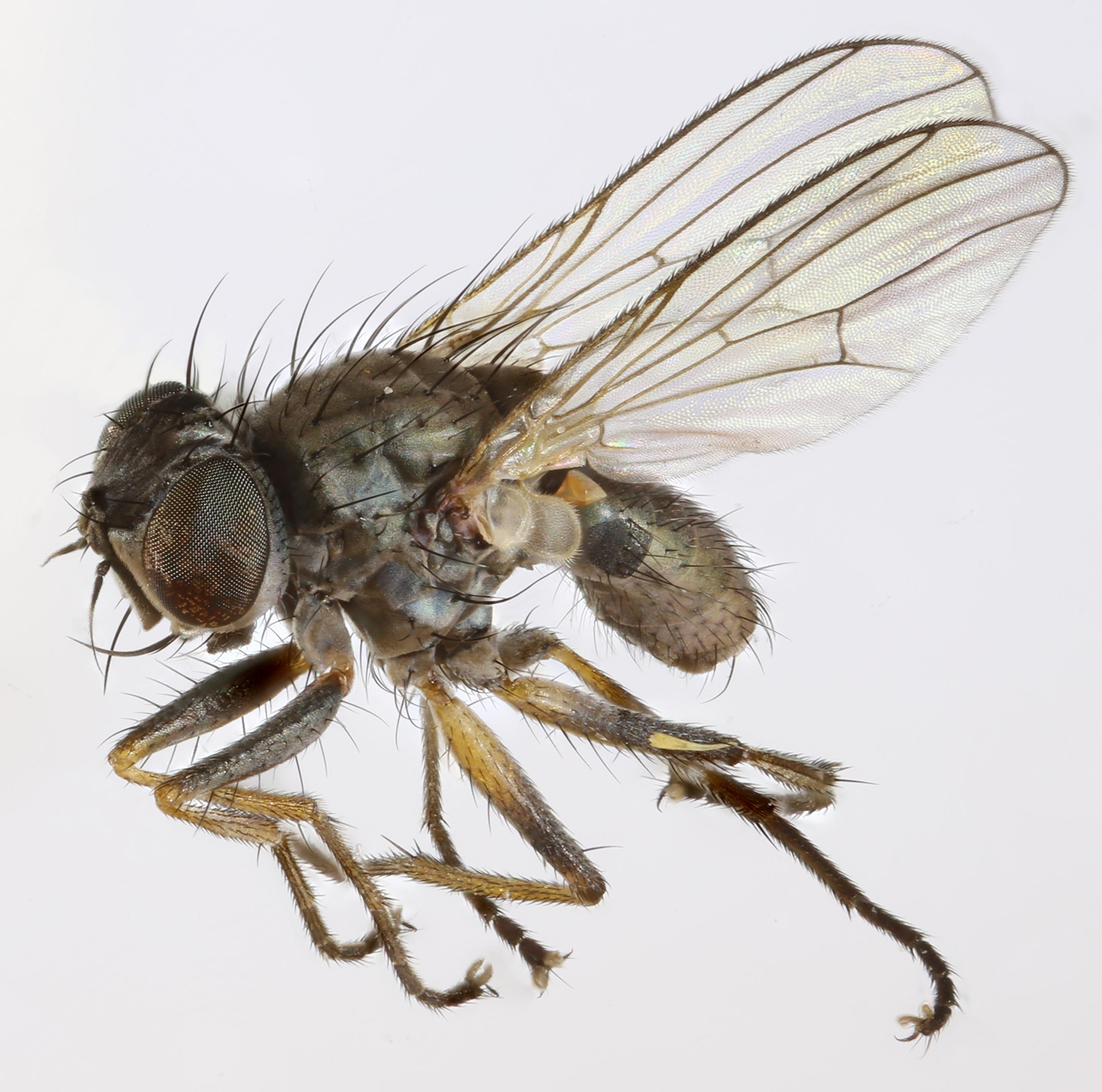
- Coenosia antennata North Wales

Scientific classification
- Kingdom: Animalia
- Phylum: Arthropoda
- Class: Insecta
- Order: Diptera
- Family: Muscidae
- Genus: Coenosia
- Species: C. antennata

Binomial name
- Coenosia antennata (Zetterstedt, 1849)

= Coenosia antennata =

Species of fly

Coenosia antennata is a species of fly in the family Muscidae. It is found in the Palearctic.
