= Labarrus rigidus =

Scientific classification
- Kingdom: Animalia
- Phylum: Arthropoda
- Clade: Pancrustacea
- Class: Insecta
- Order: Coleoptera
- Suborder: Polyphaga
- Infraorder: Scarabaeiformia
- Family: Scarabaeidae
- Genus: Labarrus
- Species: L. rigidus

Binomial name
- Labarrus rigidus (Balthasar, 1936)

Synonyms
- Aphodius (Pseudocalamosternus) rigidus Balthasar, 1936

Species of beetle

Labarrus rigidus is a species of beetle of the family Scarabaeidae. It is found in China (Shandong).

== Description ==
Adults reach a length of about 4 mm (0.16 in). They have a nearly parallel-sided, moderately convex, shining, glabrous body. The head is dark brown and the disc of the pronotum is blackish-brown, while lateral margins are yellowish-brown. The scutellum is dark and the elytra are yellow, each with a darker spot. The legs are yellowish-brown.
