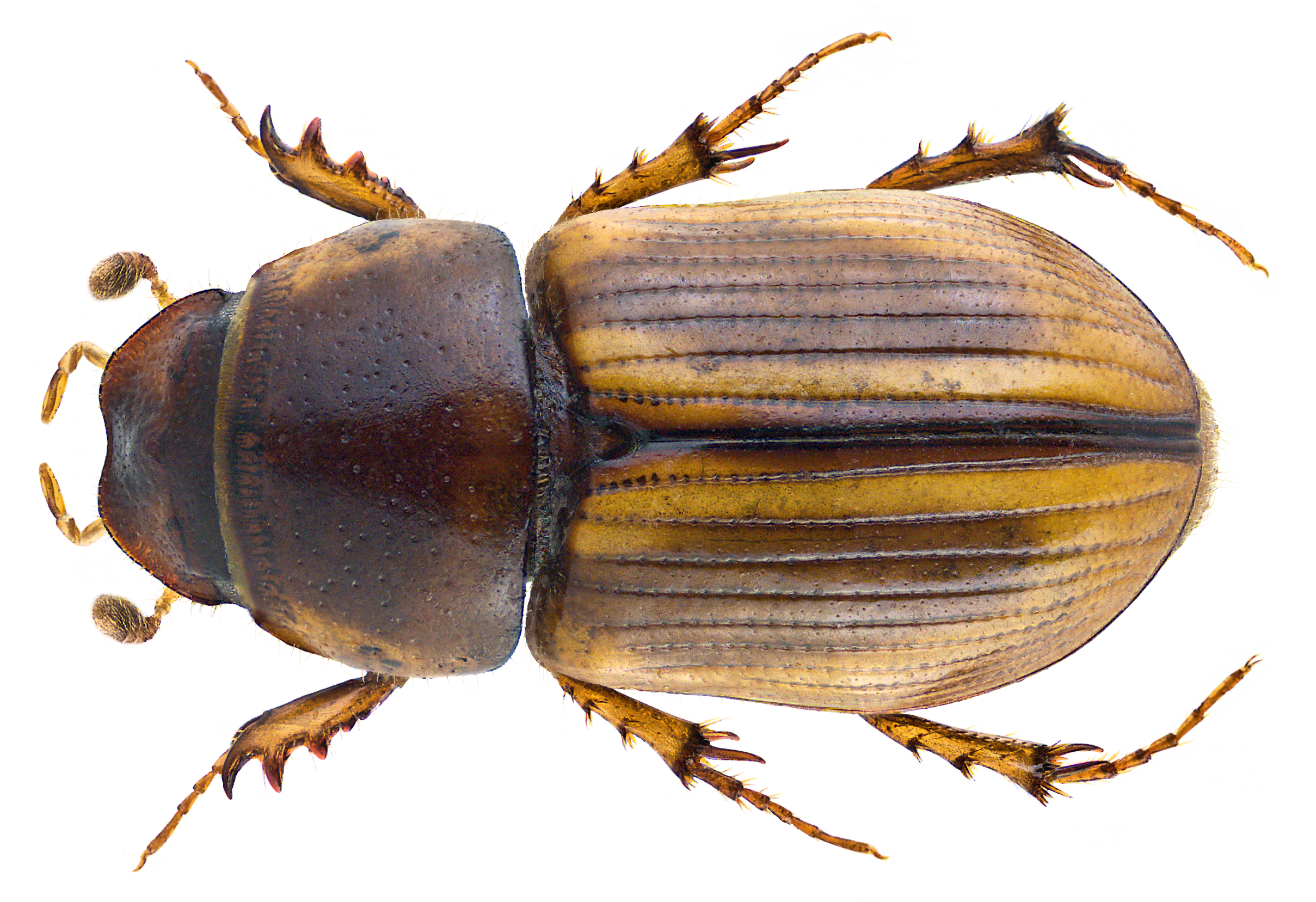
- Labarrus witboii, Namibia

Scientific classification
- Kingdom: Animalia
- Phylum: Arthropoda
- Clade: Pancrustacea
- Class: Insecta
- Order: Coleoptera
- Suborder: Polyphaga
- Infraorder: Scarabaeiformia
- Family: Scarabaeidae
- Subfamily: Aphodiinae
- Tribe: Aphodiini
- Genus: Labarrus; Mulsant & Rey, 1869

Synonyms
- Aphodius (Labarrus) Mulsant & Rey, 1870; Aphodius (Pseudocalamosternus) Balthasar, 1936

= Labarrus =

Genus of beetles

Labarrus is a genus of scarab beetles in the family Scarabaeidae. There are about 20 described species in Labarrus, found worldwide.

== Species ==
These species belong to the genus Labarrus:

- Labarrus digitatus (Harold, 1871)
- Labarrus evachromae (Chromý, 1993)
- Labarrus hoabinhensis (Balthasar, 1946)
- Labarrus innumerabilis (Schmidt, 1911) (including Labarrus meruensis)
- Labarrus kasyi (Petrovitz, 1965)
- Labarrus lividus (Olivier, 1789) (including Labarrus cincticulus, which is treated as a valid species in some schemes)
- Labarrus madagassicus (Petrovitz, 1961)
- Labarrus nabeleki (Balthasar, 1936)
- Labarrus paludani (Petrovitz, 1955)
- Labarrus paralividus (Balthasar, 1941)
- Labarrus parnaguaensis (Petrovitz, 1961)
- Labarrus pseudolividus (Balthasar, 1941)
- Labarrus rigidus (Balthasar, 1936)
- Labarrus rugosicapita (Mittal, 1993)
- Labarrus splendidus (Petrovitz, 1955)
- Labarrus sublimbatus (Motschulsky, 1860)
- Labarrus translucidus (Petrovitz, 1961)
- Labarrus umbratus (Petrovitz, 1961)
- Labarrus witboii (Petrovitz, 1961)
