= List of Lepidoptera of Qatar =

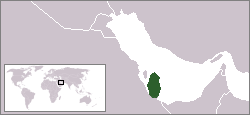
Location of Qatar

According to a recent estimate, there are about 34 Lepidoptera species (butterflies and moths) in Qatar.

== Butterflies ==
=== Hesperiidae ===
- Gegenes nostradamus (Fabricius, 1793)
- Pelopidas thrax (Hübner, 1821)

=== Lycaenidae ===
- Azanus ubaldus (Stoll, 1782)
- Brephidium exilis (Boisduval, 1852)
- Lampides boeticus (Linnaeus, 1767)
- Tarucus balkanicus (Freyer, 1885)
- Tarucus rosacea (Austaut, 1885)
- Zizeeria karsandra (Moore, 1865)
- Zizeeria knysna (Trimen, 1862)

=== Nymphalidae ===
- Danaus chrysippus chrysippus (Linnaeus, 1758)
- Junonia orithya (Linnaeus, 1758)
- Vanessa cardui (Linnaeus, 1758)

=== Papilionidae ===
- Papilio demoleus demoleus Linnaeus, 1758

=== Pieridae ===
- Belenois aurota (Fabricius, 1793)
- Colias croceus (Geoffroy, 1785)
- Colotis fausta (Olivier, 1804)
- Colotis phisadia (Godart, 1819)
- Pieris rapae (Linnaeus, 1758)
- Pontia glauconome (Klug, 1829)

== Moths ==
=== Crambidae ===
- Cornifrons ulceratalis Lederer, 1858
- Euchromius ocellea (Haworth, 1811)
- Herpetogramma licarsisalis (Walker, 1859)
- Nomophila noctuella (Denis & Schiffermüller, 1775)
- Pyrausta phaenicealis (Hübner, 1818)
- Spoladea recurvalis (Fabricius, 1775)

=== Cossidae ===
- Eremocossus vaulogeri (Staudinger, 1897)
- Holcocerus gloriosus (Erschoff, 1874)

=== Erebidae ===
- Clytie haifae (Habich, 1905)
- Lygephila exsiccata Lederer, 1855
- Mocis frugalis (Fabricius, 1775)
- Utetheisa pulchella (Linnaeus, 1758)

=== Geometridae ===
- Scopula coenosaria Lederer 1855
- Scopula minorata ochroleucaria (Herrich-Schäffer, 1851)
- Rhodometra sacraria Linnaeus, 1767

=== Lasiocampidae ===
- Streblote siva (Lefèbvre, 1827)

=== Noctuidae ===
- Agrotis ipsilon (Hufnagel, 1766)
- Autographa gamma (Linnaeus, 1758)
- Cornutiplusia circumflexa Linnaeus, 1767
- Helicoverpa zea (Boddie, 1850)
- Heliothis peltigera (Denis & Schiffermüller, 1775)
- Spodoptera exigua (Hübner, 1808)
- Spodoptera littoralis Boisduval, 1833
- Trichoplusia ni (Hübner, 1800-1803)

=== Sphingidae ===
- Acherontia atropos (Linnaeus, 1758)
- Acherontia styx (Westwood, 1847)
- Agrius convolvuli (Linnaeus, 1758)
- Daphnis nerii (Linnaeus, 1758)
- Hippotion celerio (Linnaeus, 1758)
- Hyles lineata (Fabricius, 1775)

== See also ==
- List of arthropods of Qatar
