= Labarrus parnaguaensis =

Scientific classification
- Kingdom: Animalia
- Phylum: Arthropoda
- Clade: Pancrustacea
- Class: Insecta
- Order: Coleoptera
- Suborder: Polyphaga
- Infraorder: Scarabaeiformia
- Family: Scarabaeidae
- Genus: Labarrus
- Species: L. parnaguaensis

Binomial name
- Labarrus parnaguaensis (Petrovitz, 1961)

Synonyms
- Aphodius (Nialus) parnaguaensis Petrovitz, 1961

Species of beetle

Labarrus parnaguaensis is a species of beetle of the family Scarabaeidae. It is found in Argentina, Bolivia, Brazil (Amazonas, Bahia, Ceará, Distrito Federal, Goiás, Maranhão, Mato Grosso, Mato Grosso do Sul, Minas Gerais, Paraíba, Paraná, Piauí, Rio de Janeiro, Rio Grande do Sul, Santa Catarina, São Paulo, Tocantins), Ecuador, Mexico (Hidalgo, Oaxaca), Paraguay, Peru, Uruguay, Venezuela, Botswana, Ethiopia, Kenya, Mozambique, Namibia, Republic of the Congo, South Africa, Somalia, Tanzania, Uganda, Zambia, Zimbabwe, the Comores and Madagascar.

== Description ==
Adults reach a length of about 3.2–3.9 mm (0.13–0.15 in). The clypeus is clearly emarginate, with coarse punctures extending to the frons.

== Life history ==
They are attracted to bovine, human, pig and Tapirus feces.
