= Bithoracochaeta =

Scientific classification
- Domain: Eukaryota
- Kingdom: Animalia
- Phylum: Arthropoda
- Class: Insecta
- Order: Diptera
- Family: Muscidae
- Subfamily: Coenosiinae
- Tribe: Coenosiini
- Genus: Bithoracochaeta; Stein, 1911

Genus of flies

Bithoracochaeta is a genus of house flies, in the family Muscidae. There are about 14 described species in Bithoracochaeta.

== Species ==
These 14 species belong to the genus Bithoracochaeta:

- Bithoracochaeta annulata Stein, 1911^{c g}
- Bithoracochaeta atricornis Malloch, 1934^{c g}
- Bithoracochaeta calopus Bigot, 1885^{g}
- Bithoracochaeta couriae Jaume-Schinkel & Ibáñez-Bernal, 2020 ^{g}
- Bithoracochaeta equatorialis Couri & Marques, 2001^{c g}
- Bithoracochaeta flavicoxa Malloch, 1934^{c g}
- Bithoracochaeta leucoprocta (Wiedemann, 1830)^{i c g b}
- Bithoracochaeta maricaensis Couri & Motta, 1995^{c g}
- Bithoracochaeta nigricornis Malloch, 1934^{c g}
- Bithoracochaeta nigricoxa Couri, 2005^{c g}
- Bithoracochaeta pacifera (Giglio-Tos, 1893)^{c g}
- Bithoracochaeta plumata Albuquerque, 1955^{c g}
- Bithoracochaeta sociabilis Blanchard, 1937^{c g}
- Bithoracochaeta varicornis (Coquillett, 1900)^{c g}

Data sources: i = ITIS, c = Catalogue of Life, g = GBIF, b = Bugguide.net
