= Coenosia elegans =

Scientific classification
- Domain: Eukaryota
- Kingdom: Animalia
- Phylum: Arthropoda
- Class: Insecta
- Order: Diptera
- Family: Muscidae
- Genus: Coenosia
- Species: C. elegans

Binomial name
- Coenosia elegans Huckett, 1965

Species of fly

Coenosia elegans is a species of fly in the genus Coenosia. It is found in Alaska.
