= Labarrus paludani =

Scientific classification
- Kingdom: Animalia
- Phylum: Arthropoda
- Clade: Pancrustacea
- Class: Insecta
- Order: Coleoptera
- Suborder: Polyphaga
- Infraorder: Scarabaeiformia
- Family: Scarabaeidae
- Genus: Labarrus
- Species: L. paludani

Binomial name
- Labarrus paludani (Petrovitz, 1955)

Synonyms
- Aphodius (Calamosternus) paludani Petrovitz, 1955

Species of beetle

Labarrus paludani is a species of beetle of the family Scarabaeidae. It is found in Afghanistan and Iran.

== Description ==
Adults reach a length of about 5–5.7 mm (0.20–0.22 in). They have an elongate, parallel-sided, shiny, glabrous, light yellowish-brown body, with the head, the disc and a spot on each side of the pronotum, a spot on each elytron, and the sutural margin darker brown. The legs are brown.
