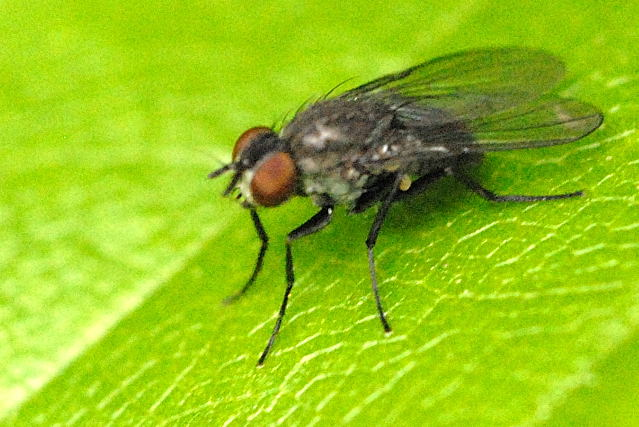
- Coenosia sexmaculata

Scientific classification
- Kingdom: Animalia
- Phylum: Arthropoda
- Clade: Pancrustacea
- Class: Insecta
- Order: Diptera
- Family: Muscidae
- Subfamily: Coenosiinae
- Tribe: Coenosiini
- Genus: Coenosia; Meigen, 1826

Type species
- Musca tigrina Fabricius, 1775

Synonyms
- Allognota Pokorny, 1893; Caricea Robineau-Desvoidy, 1830; Dexiopsis Pokorny, 1893; Hoplogaster Rondani, 1871; Limosia Robineau-Desvoidy, 1830; Oplogaster Rondani, 1856

= Coenosia =

Genus of flies

Coenosia atra with prey

Coenosia is a very large genus (more than 350 species) of true flies of the family Muscidae. Coenosia are known as tiger flies since they are predators and hunt many kinds of insects and other invertebrates.

In Denmark, fungi Strongwellsea tigrinae and Strongwellsea acerosa (from the Strongwellsea genus, order Entomophthorales) infect the flying hosts from the genus Coenosia, including species Coenosia tigrina and Coenosia testacea. While most fungi spore once the host is dead, with Strongwellsea, the host continues to live for days, carrying out normal activities and socialising with other flies while the fungus consumes its genitals, fat reserves, reproductive organs and finally its muscle, all the while shooting out thousands of spores on to other individuals.

== Species ==
- Coenosia acuminata Strobl, 1898
- Coenosia agromyzina (Fallén, 1825)
- Coenosia alaskensis Huckett, 1965
- Coenosia albibasis Stein, 1920
- Coenosia albicornis Meigen, 1826
- Coenosia albifacies (Johnson, 1922)
- Coenosia algivora Hutton, 1901
- Coenosia aliena Malloch, 1921
- Coenosia alticola Malloch, 1919
- Coenosia ambigua Séguy, 1923
- Coenosia ambulans Meigen, 1826
- Coenosia antennalis Stein, 1898
- Coenosia antennata (Zetterstedt, 1849)
- Coenosia anthracina Malloch, 1921
- Coenosia apicata Huckett, 1965
- Coenosia argentata Coquillett, 1904
- Coenosia argenticeps Malloch, 1920
- Coenosia armiger Huckett, 1934
- Coenosia atrata Walker, 1853
- Coenosia atra Meigen, 1830
- Coenosia atritibia Ringdahl, 1926
- Coenosia attenuata Stein, 1903
- Coenosia barbipes Rondani, 1866
- Coenosia bartaki Gregor, 1991
- Coenosia beschovskii Lavciev, 1970
- Coenosia bilineella (Zetterstedt, 1838)
- Coenosia bivittata Stein, 1908
- Coenosia bohemica Gregor & Rozkosný, 2008
- Coenosia bonita Huckett, 1934
- Coenosia brevisquama d'Assis-Fonseca, 1966
- Coenosia californica (Malloch, 1920)
- Coenosia campestris (Robineau-Desvoidy, 1830)
- Coenosia canadensis Curran, 1933
- Coenosia candida Huckett, 1934
- Coenosia cilicauda Malloch, 1920
- Coenosia cingulipes (Zetterstedt, 1849)
- Coenosia comita (Huckett, 1936)
- Coenosia compressa Stein, 1904
- Coenosia conflicta Huckett, 1965
- Coenosia conforma Huckett, 1934
- Coenosia dealbata (Zetterstedt, 1838)
- Coenosia demoralis Huckett, 1965
- Coenosia distinguens Collin, 1930
- Coenosia dorsovittata Malloch, 1920
- Coenosia dubiosa Hennig, 1961
- Coenosia effulgens Huckett, 1934
- Coenosia elegans Huckett, 1965
- Coenosia emiliae Lukasheva, 1986
- Coenosia errans Malloch, 1920
- Coenosia facilis Huckett, 1965
- Coenosia femoralis (Robineau-Desvoidy, 1830)
- Coenosia flagelliseta Muller, 2019
- Coenosia flavibasis Huckett, 1934
- Coenosia flavicornis (Fallén, 1825)
- Coenosia flavidipalpis Huckett, 1934
- Coenosia flavifrons Stein, 1898
- Coenosia flavimana (Zetterstedt, 1845)
- Coenosia flaviseta Huckett, 1965
- Coenosia flavissima Hennig, 1961
- Coenosia fontana Huckett, 1966
- Coenosia fraterna Malloch, 1918
- Coenosia freyi Tiensuu, 1945
- Coenosia frisoni Malloch, 1920
- Coenosia fulvipes Huckett, 1965
- Coenosia fumipennis Huckett, 1934
- Coenosia furtiva Huckett, 1934
- Coenosia fuscifrons Malloch, 1919
- Coenosia fuscipes Huckett, 1965
- Coenosia genualis Rondani, 1866
- Coenosia globuliseta Pont, 1980
- Coenosia gracilis Stein, 1916
- Coenosia graciliventris Ringdahl, 1954
- Coenosia hucketti Patitucci, Mulieri, Couri & Domínguez, 2023
- Coenosia humilis Meigen, 1826
- Coenosia imperator (Walker, 1849)
- Coenosia impunctata Malloch, 1920
- Coenosia incisurata Wulp, 1869
- Coenosia infantula Rondani, 1866
- Coenosia intacta Walker, 1853
- Coenosia intermedia (Fallén, 1825)
- Coenosia johnsoni Malloch, 1920
- Coenosia karli Pont, 2001
- Coenosia lacteipennis (Zetterstedt, 1845)
- Coenosia laeta Huckett, 1934
- Coenosia laricata Malloch, 1920
- Coenosia lata Walker, 1853
- Coenosia lineatipes (Zetterstedt, 1845)
- Coenosia longimaculata Stein, 1920
- Coenosia lyneborgi Pont, 1972
- Coenosia macrotriseta Muller & Miller, 2013
- Coenosia maculiventris Huckett, 1934
- Coenosia means Meigen, 1826
- Coenosia minor Huckett, 1965
- Coenosia minutalis (Zetterstedt, 1860)
- Coenosia mixta Schnabl, 1911
- Coenosia modesta Loew, 1872
- Coenosia mollicula (Fallén, 1825)
- Coenosia nevadensis Lyneborg, 1970
- Coenosia nigricoxa Stein, 1920
- Coenosia nigridigita Rondani, 1866
- Coenosia nigrifemorata Huckett, 1965
- Coenosia nigritarsis (Stein, 1898)
- Coenosia nigritella Huckett, 1934
- Coenosia nivea Loew, 1872
- Coenosia nudipes Stein, 1920
- Coenosia nudiseta Stein, 1898
- Coenosia obscuricula (Rondani, 1871)
- Coenosia octopunctata (Zetterstedt, 1838)
- Coenosia octosignata Rondani, 1866
- Coenosia oregonensis Malloch, 1919
- Coenosia pallipes Stein, 1898
- Coenosia paludis Tiensuu, 1939
- Coenosia patelligera Rondani, 1866
- Coenosia pauli Pont, 2001
- Coenosia pedella (Fallén, 1825)
- Coenosia perpusilla Meigen, 1826
- Coenosia perspicua Huckett, 1934
- Coenosia pilosissima Stein, 1920
- Coenosia praetexta Pandellé, 1899
- Coenosia pudorosa Collin, 1953
- Coenosia pulicaria (Zetterstedt, 1845)
- Coenosia pumila (Fallén, 1825)
- Coenosia pygmaea (Zetterstedt, 1845)
- Coenosia remissa Huckett, 1965
- Coenosia rhaensis Hennig, 1961
- Coenosia rubrina Huckett, 1934
- Coenosia rufibasis Stein, 1920
- Coenosia ruficornis Macquart, 1835
- Coenosia rufipalpis Meigen, 1826
- Coenosia rufitibia Stein, 1920
- Coenosia sallae Tiensuu, 1938
- Coenosia semivitta (Malloch, 1918)
- Coenosia setigera Malloch, 1918
- Coenosia setipes Huckett, 1965
- Coenosia sexmaculata Meigen, 1838
- Coenosia sexpustulata Rondani, 1866
- Coenosia stigmatica Wood, 1913
- Coenosia strigifemur Stein, 1920
- Coenosia strigipes Stein, 1916
- Coenosia styriaca Hennig, 1961
- Coenosia tausa Huckett, 1934
- Coenosia tendipes Huckett, 1965
- Coenosia testacea (Robineau-Desvoidy, 1830)
- Coenosia tigrina (Fabricius, 1775)
- Coenosia toshua Huckett, 1934
- Coenosia transiens Stein, 1901
- Coenosia trilineella (Zetterstedt, 1838)
- Coenosia verralli Collin, 1953
- Coenosia vibrissata Collin, 1953
- Coenosia villipes Rondani, 1866
- Coenosia wulpi Pont, 1972
- Coenosia xanthocera Hennig, 1961
