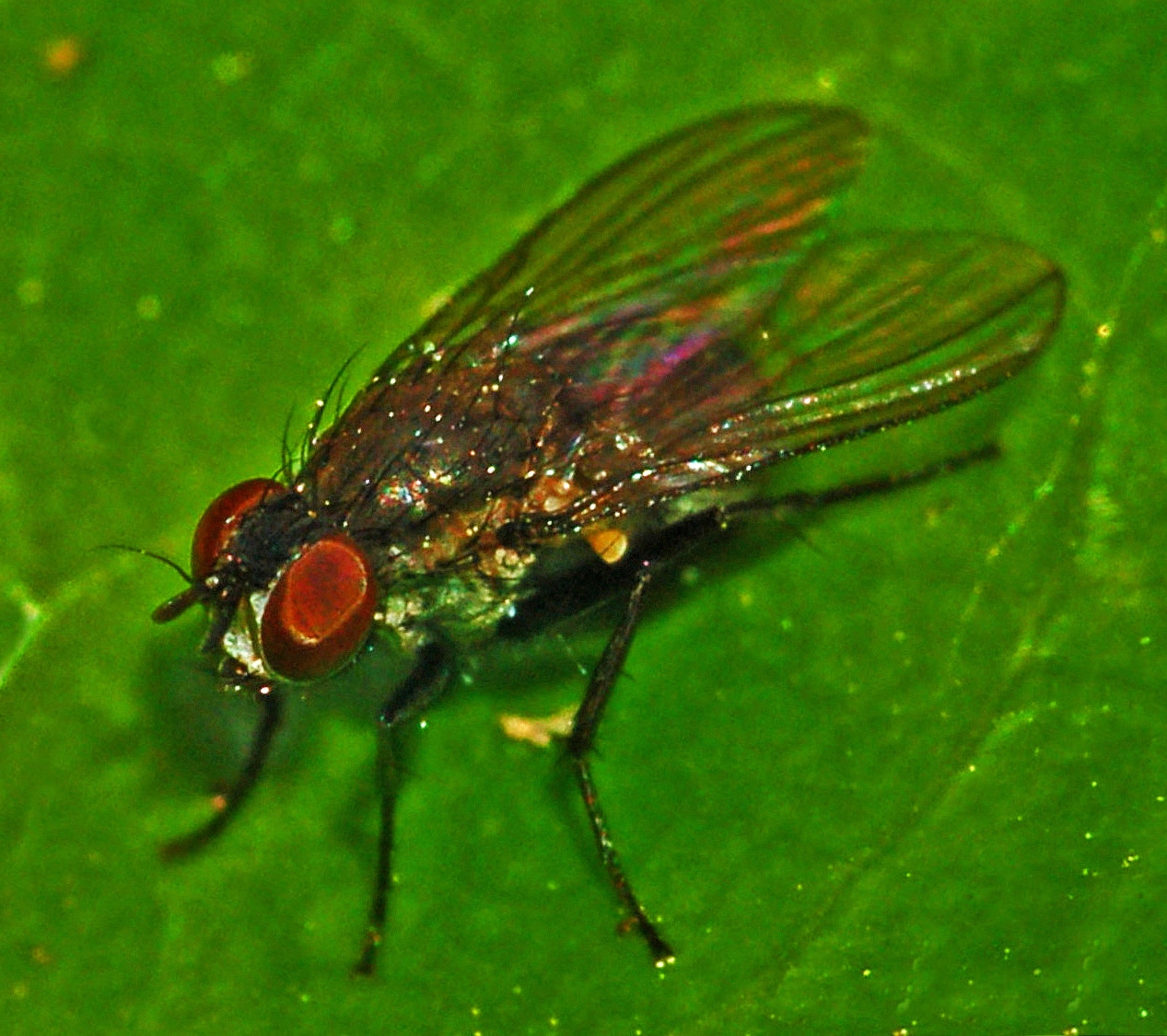

Scientific classification
- Kingdom: Animalia
- Phylum: Arthropoda
- Class: Insecta
- Order: Diptera
- Family: Muscidae
- Genus: Coenosia
- Species: C. agromyzina

Binomial name
- Coenosia agromyzina (Fallen, 1825)

Synonyms
- Anthomyia luctuosa Meigen, 1826; Aricia opacula Zetterstedt, 1855; Caenosia agromizella Rondani, 1866; Coenosia nigra Meigen, 1826; Coenosia simplex Meigen, 1826; Diatinoza trentina Enderlein, 1936

= Coenosia agromyzina =

Species of fly

Coenosia agromyzina is a species of fly in the family Muscidae.

== Distribution ==
This common species can be found in the Palearctic realm .

== Description ==
Coenosia agromyzina can reach a length of 2–3.5 millimetres (0.079–0.138 in). The thorax and abdomen show a brownish-black coloration. The antennae are black and rather elongated. Also palps are black. The legs are black. The wings are slightly brown-gray tinted. The main vein running along the leading edge of the wings ends at the cubital vein.

== Biology ==
Adults fly from May to October preying on small chironomids, honeydew and Hedera flowers. Larvae of these flies can be found in March feeding on tiny earthworms (Oligochaeta).

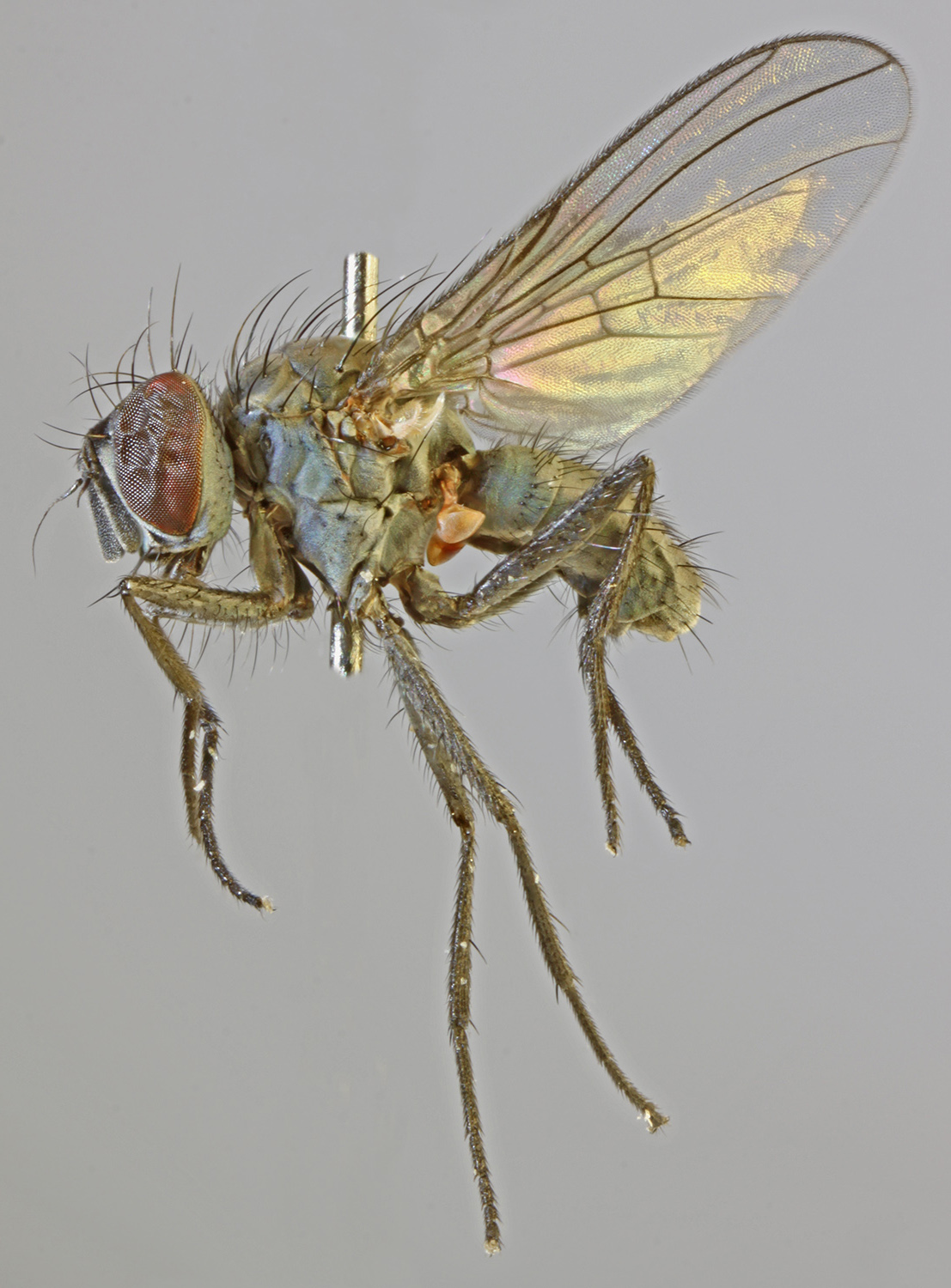
Mounted specimen
