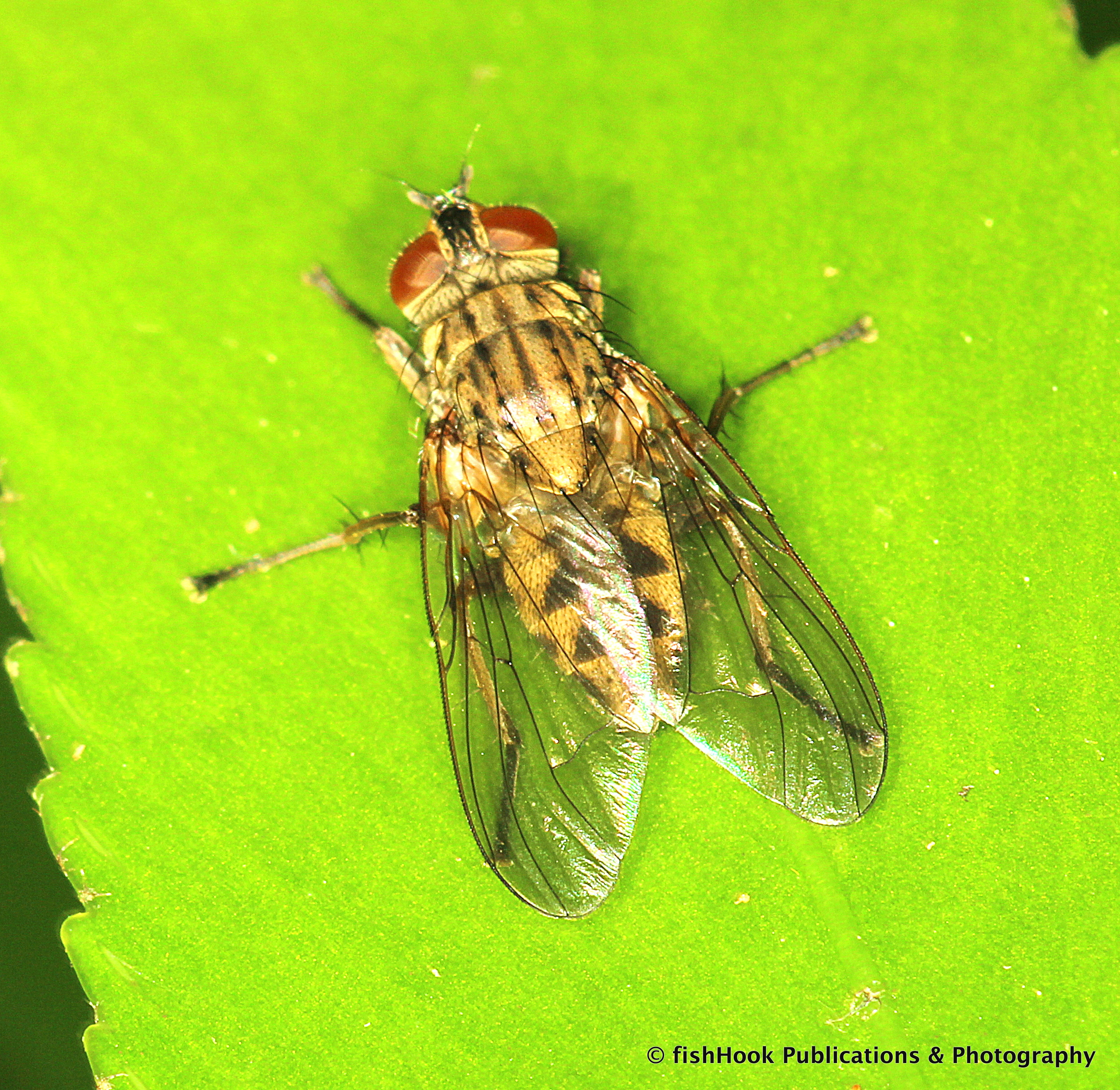

Scientific classification
- Kingdom: Animalia
- Phylum: Arthropoda
- Class: Insecta
- Order: Diptera
- Family: Muscidae
- Genus: Coenosia
- Species: C. algivora

Binomial name
- Coenosia algivora Hutton, 1901

= Coenosia algivora =

Species of fly

Coenosia algivora, also known as Hutton's tiger fly, is a species of fly endemic to New Zealand. Recorded from the Type locality: Christchurch (Hutton 1901), and in the Wellington region, Polhill Reserve.

== Description ==
Body yellowish with distinctive parallel dark stripes on thorax and prominent triangular patches on upper abdomen.

Thorax pale yellowish-grey, with indistinct longitudinal dark bands. Abdomen pale yellowish-grey. A large rather darker triangular mark covers the centres of the second and third segments, its broad base being on the posterior border of the latter segment. The fourth segment has three indistinct dark spots; the fifth segment is irregularly marked. Legs dark-grey. Halteres brown.

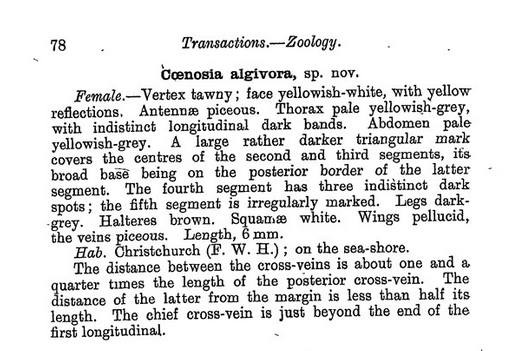

== Ecology ==
Coenosia is one of the most speciose genera of muscid flies in the world, with more than 360 known species. They are distributed throughout all biogeographic regions and the adults are considered to be obligate carnivores.
