= Labarrus innumerabilis =

Scientific classification
- Kingdom: Animalia
- Phylum: Arthropoda
- Clade: Pancrustacea
- Class: Insecta
- Order: Coleoptera
- Suborder: Polyphaga
- Infraorder: Scarabaeiformia
- Family: Scarabaeidae
- Genus: Labarrus
- Species: L. innumerabilis

Binomial name
- Labarrus innumerabilis (Schmidt, 1910)

Synonyms
- Aphodius lividus innumerabilis Schmidt, 1910; Aphodius (Labarrus) afrolividus Rakovič, 1991; Aphodius (Nialus) tanganyicensus Balthasar, 1967; Aphodius (Nialus) meruensis Petrovitz, 1961; Aphodius (Nialus) sublividus Balthasar, 1941

Species of beetle

Labarrus innumerabilis is a species of beetle of the family Scarabaeidae. It is found in Eritrea, Ethiopia, Ghana, Kenya, Namibia, the Democratic Republic of the Congo, the Republic of the Congo, Rwanda, Somalia, Tanzania, Uganda, Zambia, Madagascar and the Comoros.
