= Hyperaspis vinciguerrae =

Scientific classification
- Kingdom: Animalia
- Phylum: Arthropoda
- Clade: Pancrustacea
- Class: Insecta
- Order: Coleoptera
- Suborder: Polyphaga
- Infraorder: Cucujiformia
- Family: Coccinellidae
- Genus: Hyperaspis
- Species: H. vinciguerrae

Binomial name
- Hyperaspis vinciguerrae (Capra, 1929)

Species of beetle

Hyperaspis vinciguerrae, the pitchfork lady beetle, is a species of lady beetle in the family Coccinellidae. It is found in Northern Africa and Western Asia
