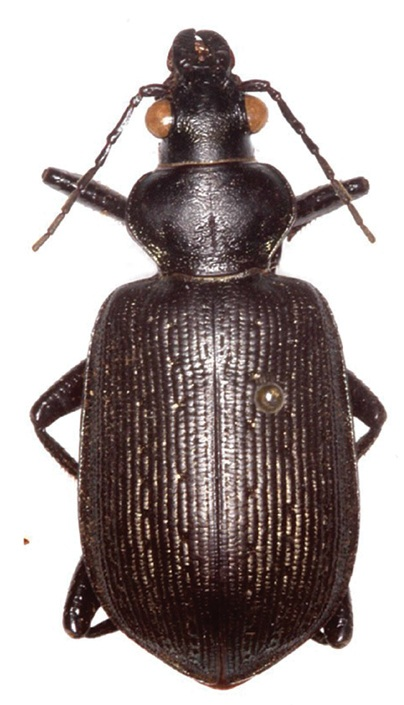
- Calosoma imbricatum hottentottum

Scientific classification
- Domain: Eukaryota
- Kingdom: Animalia
- Phylum: Arthropoda
- Class: Insecta
- Order: Coleoptera
- Suborder: Adephaga
- Family: Carabidae
- Genus: Calosoma
- Species: C. imbricatum

Binomial name
- Calosoma imbricatum Klug, 1832

Synonyms
- Calosoma augustasi Obydov, 2005; Caminara arabica Motschulsky, 1866; Calosoma linnavuorii Mandl, 1968; Calosoma loeffleri Mandl, 1953

= Calosoma imbricatum =

Species of beetle

Calosoma imbricatum is a species of ground beetle in the subfamily of Carabinae. It was described by Johann Christoph Friedrich Klug in 1832. It is found in Egypt, Iraq, Saudi Arabia, Arab Emirates, Yemen, Iran, Kazakhstan, Uzbekistan, Turkmenistan, Cape Verde, Senegal/Gambia, Mali, Burkina Faso, Niger, Chad, Sudan, Eritrea, Djibouti, Somalia, Kenya, Tanzania, Namibia, South Africa, Pakistan, India, Vietnam and Russia.

== Subspecies ==
- Calosoma imbricatum imbricatum (Algeria, Libya, Egypt, Iraq, Saudi Arabia, Arab Emirates, Oman, Yemen, Iran, Canary Islands, Cape Verde, Senegal/Gambia, Mali, Burkina Faso, Niger, Chad, Sudan, Eritrea, Djibouti, Somalia, Pakistan)
- Calosoma imbricatum andrewesi Breuning, 1928 (India, Vietnam)
- Calosoma imbricatum deserticola Semenov, 1897 (Iran, Kazakhstan, Uzbekistan, Turkmenistan, Kyrgyzstan, Afghanistan, Russia, Mongolia)
- Calosoma imbricatum hottentottum Chaudoir, 1852 (Niger, Chad, Sudan, Kenya, Tanzania, Angola, Namibia, South Africa)
