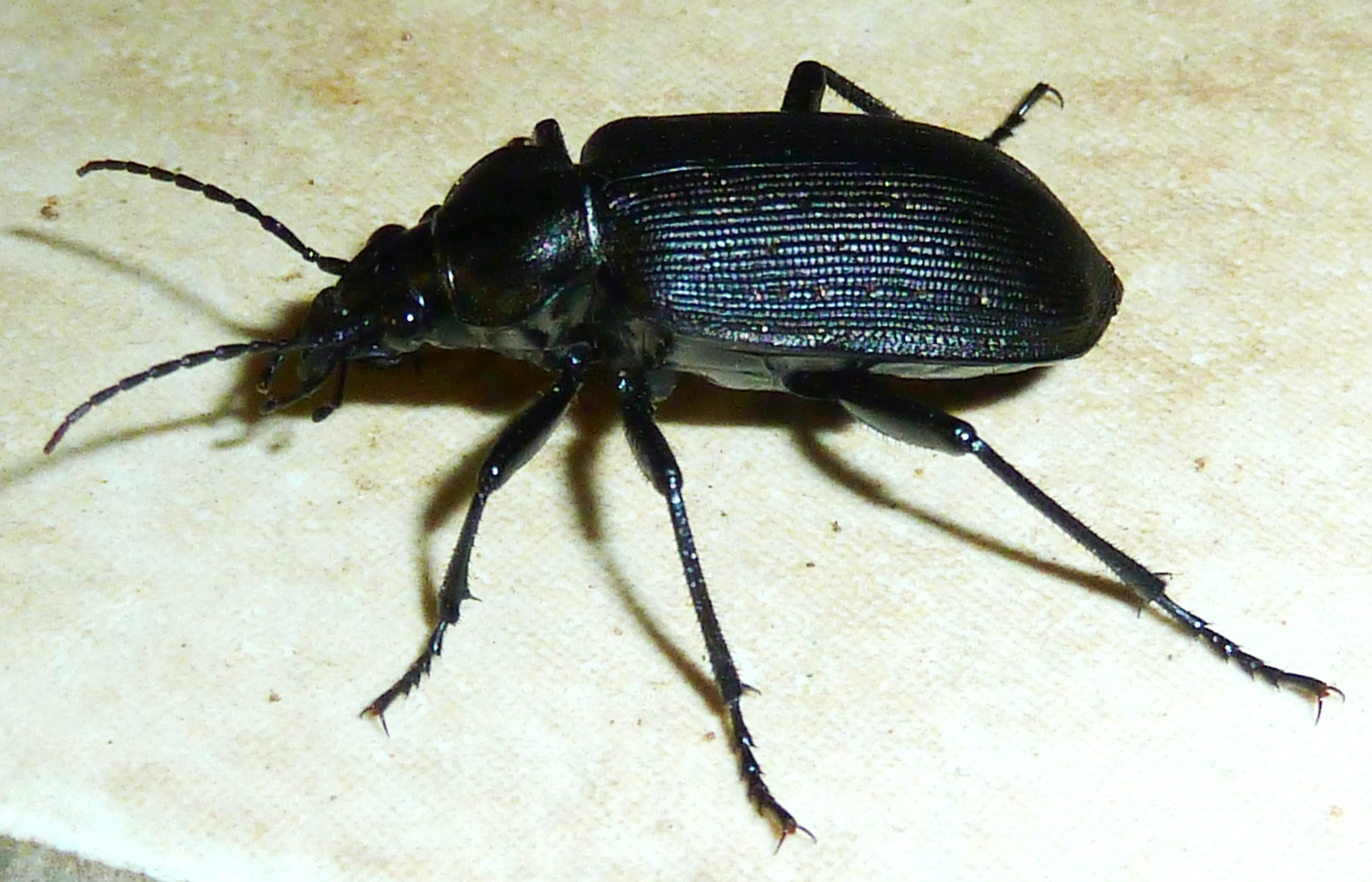

Scientific classification
- Kingdom: Animalia
- Phylum: Arthropoda
- Class: Insecta
- Order: Coleoptera
- Suborder: Adephaga
- Family: Carabidae
- Genus: Calosoma
- Species: C. chlorostictum

Binomial name
- Calosoma chlorostictum Dejean, 1831

Synonyms
- Calosoma curvipes Kirby, 1819; Calosoma ivinskisi Obydov & Saldaitis, 2010; Calosoma rugosulum Mandl, 1970; Calosoma kasyi Mandl, 1967; Calosoma amabile Mandl, 1954; Calosoma hadramautum Mandl, 1954; Calosoma calidum Lapouge, 1924; Calosoma elegans Géhin, 1885; Calosoma australe Hope, 1845; Calosoma crassipes Chaudoir, 1843; Carabus rugosus DeGeer, 1778; Calosoma tegulatum Wollaston, 1867; Calosoma haligena Wollaston, 1861

= Calosoma chlorostictum =

Species of beetle

Calosoma chlorostictum is a species of ground beetle in the subfamily of Carabinae. It was described by Dejean in 1831. This species is found in Egypt, Israel/Palestine, Iraq, Saudi Arabia, Yemen, Iran, Socotra, Cape Verde, Sudan, Eritrea, Djibouti, Somalia, DR Congo, Kenya, Tanzania, Mozambique, Zimbabwe, Botswana, Namibia, South Africa and on St. Helena.

== Subspecies ==
- Calosoma chlorostictum chlorostictum (Egypt, Israel/Palestine, Iraq, Saudi Arabia, Yemen, Iran, Socotra, Sudan, Eritrea, Djibouti, Somalia, DR Congo, Kenya, Tanzania, Mozambique, Zimbabwe, Botswana, Namibia, South Africa)
- Calosoma chlorostictum cognatum Chaudoir, 1850 (Cape Verde)
- Calosoma chlorostictum helenae Hope, 1838 (St. Helena)
