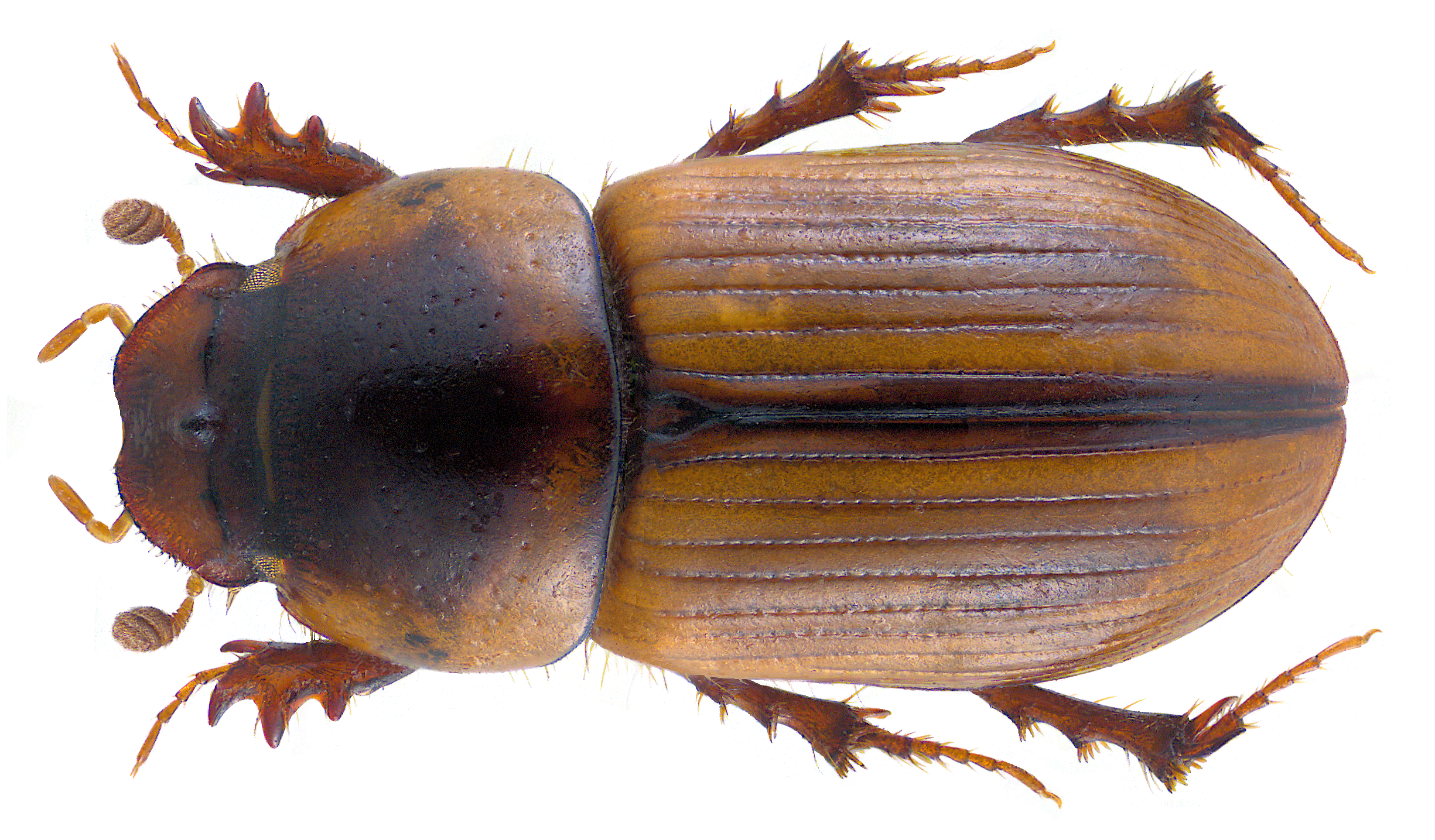
- Labarrus lividus, 4.4 mm, Antalya province, Turkey

Scientific classification
- Kingdom: Animalia
- Phylum: Arthropoda
- Clade: Pancrustacea
- Class: Insecta
- Order: Coleoptera
- Suborder: Polyphaga
- Infraorder: Scarabaeiformia
- Family: Scarabaeidae
- Genus: Labarrus
- Species: L. lividus

Binomial name
- Labarrus lividus (Olivier, 1789)

Synonyms
- Aphodius lividus Olivier, 1789; Aphodius maculicollis Montrouzier, 1860; Aphodius sequens Walker, 1858; Aphodius fimetifex Gistel, 1857; Aphodius hircinus Gistel, 1857; Aphodius scutellaris Roth, 1851; Aphodius spilopterus Germar, 1848; Aphodius cincticulus Hope, 1846; Aphodius discus Wiedemann, 1823; Aphodius limbatus Wiedemann & Germar, 1821; Scarabaeus bilituratus Marsham, 1802; Aphodius anachoreta Fabricius, 1801; Aphodius obsoletus Fabricius, 1801; Scarabaeus vespertinus Panzer, 1799; Scarabaeus limicola Panzer, 1798; Scarabaeus suturalis Fabricius, 1792; Aphodius lividus matusitai Nakane, 1961

= Labarrus lividus =

Species of beetle

Labarrus lividus is a species of dung beetles in the subfamily Aphodiinae.

== Description ==
Adults reach a length of about 3–4.5 mm (0.12–0.18 in). The clypeus is clearly emarginate, and anteriorly rugosely punctured. The pronotum is strongly convex, with punctures of two sizes, and with the larger punctures scarce.

== Distribution ==
Palaearctic: Afghanistan, Albania, Algeria, Armenia, Austria, Azores, Belarus, Belgium, Bosnia Herzegovina, Bulgaria, Canary Islands, China (Beijing), Croatia, Cyprus, Czech Republic, Egypt, Estonia, Finland, France, Georgia, Germany, Great Britain, Greece, Hungary, India (Himachal Pradesh), Iran, Israel, Italy, Kazakhstan, Kuwait, Kyrgyzstan, Latvia, Lebanon, Libya, Lithuania, Madeira, Malta, Mongolia, Morocco, Nepal, Netherlands, Oman, Poland, Portugal, Romania, Qatar, Russia, Saudi Arabia, Slovakia, Slovenia, Spain, Sweden, Switzerland, Syria, Taiwan, Tajikistan, Tunisia, Turkey, Turkmenistan, Ukraine, United Arab Emirates, Uzbekistan. Afrotropical: Angola, Cameroon, Chad, Ethiopia, Ivory Coast, Mauretania, Namibia, Niger, Rwanda, Senegal, Somalia, Sudan, Madagascar. Nearctic: USA (Colorado, Illinois, Indiana, Iowa, Kansas, Maryland, Texas). Neotropical: Brazil (Maranhão, Mato Grosso do Sul, Pernambuco), Cuba, Guatemala, Mexico (Aguascalientes, Chihuahua, Coahuila, Distrito Federal, Guerrero, Hidalgo, Jalisco, México, Michoacán, Morelos, Nayarit, Oaxaca, Puebla, Sinaloa, Sonora, Tabasco, Tamaulipas, Veracruz), Nicaragua, Panama, Peru, Santo Domingo, Suriname. Australian: Australia, Papua New Guinea. Oriental: India (Andaman & Nicobar, Haryana, Rajasthan, Uttar Pradesh).

== Subspecies ==
- Labarrus lividus lividus
- Labarrus lividus matusitai (Nakane, 1961) (Saipan Island)
