= Tabanus sufis =

Scientific classification
- Kingdom: Animalia
- Phylum: Arthropoda
- Clade: Pancrustacea
- Class: Insecta
- Order: Diptera
- Family: Tabanidae
- Genus: Tabanus
- Species: T. sufis

Binomial name
- Tabanus sufis Jaennicke, 1867

Species of horse fly

Tabanus sufis, also called estuary horsefly, is a species of horse fly in the family Tabanidae.

== Distribution ==
Originally described as Tabanus sufis in 1867 by Johann Friedrich Jaennicke from specimens collected in Sudan [as "Nubia"]. Afrotropical and Palearctic species. Widespread in Africa penetrating the Palearctic realm through the East Mediterranean from Egypt and Cyprus to Saudi Arabia and the Levant north and eastwards to Iraq, Iran, Pakistan and India.

== Blood feeding hosts and veterinary relevance ==
Known hosts in Europe and the Levant are horses, donkeys, camels and humans, in Africa—horses, cattle, and humans. In Africa and the Arabian Peninsula this species is an major vector for Trypanosoma parasites causing the disease called surra. Surra is a major disease in camels, equines, cattle, and dogs, in which it can often be fatal.
