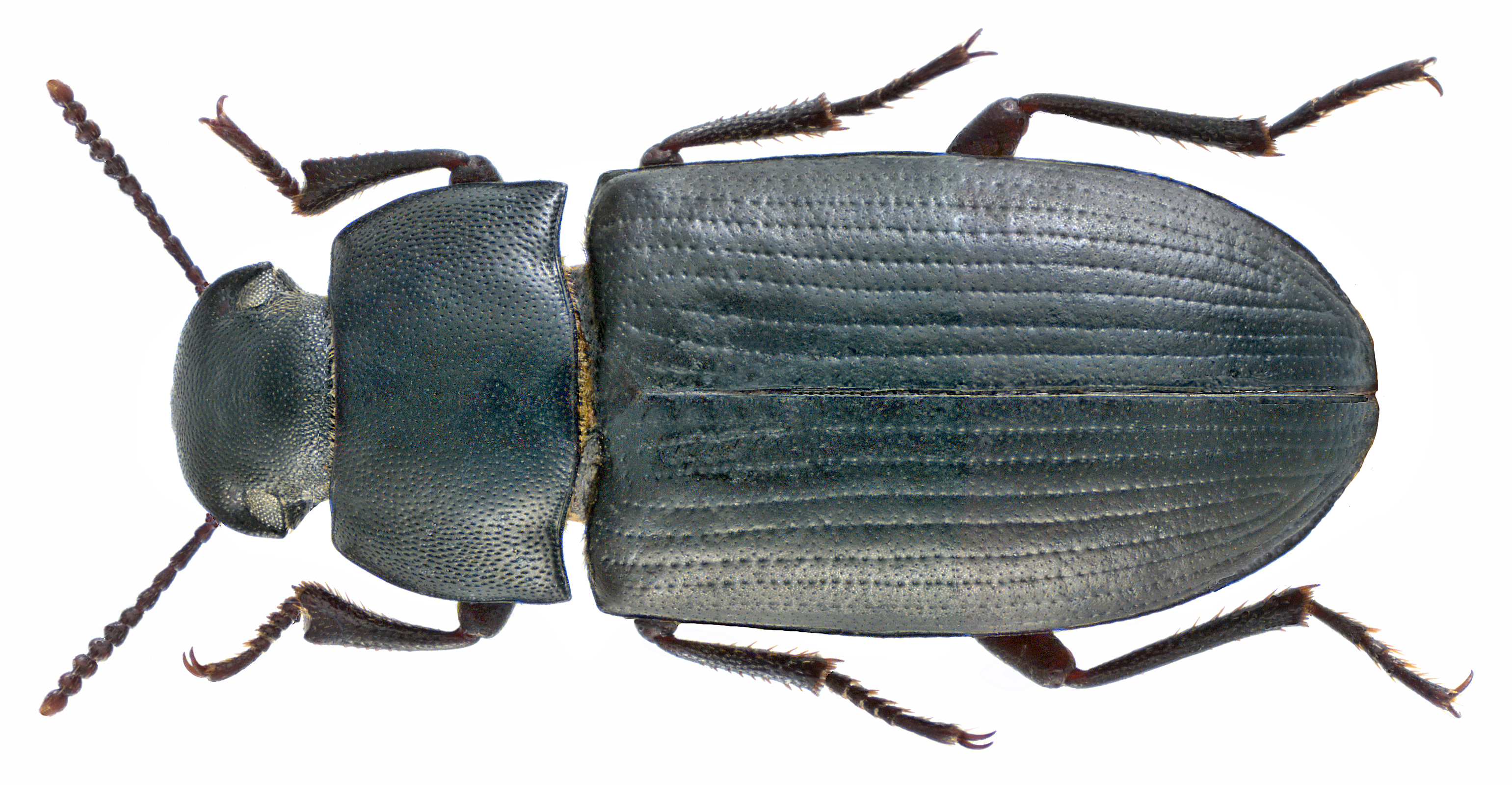

Scientific classification
- Domain: Eukaryota
- Kingdom: Animalia
- Phylum: Arthropoda
- Class: Insecta
- Order: Coleoptera
- Suborder: Polyphaga
- Infraorder: Cucujiformia
- Family: Tenebrionidae
- Genus: Opatroides
- Species: O. punctulatus

Binomial name
- Opatroides punctulatus Brull, 1832

= Opatroides punctulatus =

Species of beetle

Opatroides punctulatus is a species of darkling beetle in the family Tenebrionidae.

== Subspecies ==
These two subspecies belong to the species Opatroides punctulatus:

- Opatroides punctulatus punctulatus Brulle, 1832^{g}
- Opatroides punctulatus subcylindricus (Menetries, 1849)^{g}

Data sources: i = ITIS, c = Catalogue of Life, g = GBIF, b = Bugguide.net
