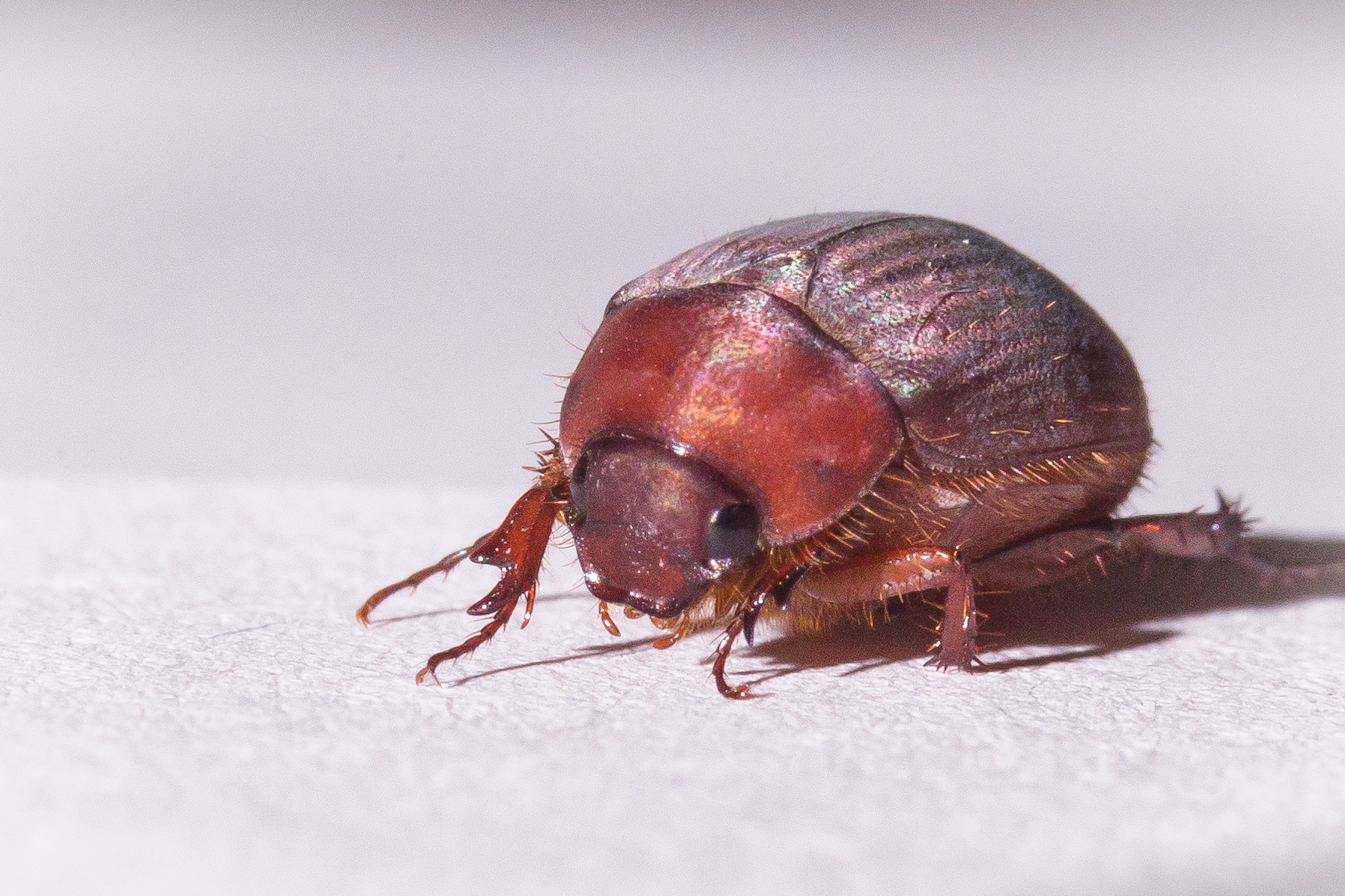

Scientific classification
- Kingdom: Animalia
- Phylum: Arthropoda
- Clade: Pancrustacea
- Class: Insecta
- Order: Coleoptera
- Suborder: Polyphaga
- Infraorder: Scarabaeiformia
- Family: Scarabaeidae
- Genus: Maladera
- Species: M. insanabilis

Binomial name
- Maladera insanabilis (Brenske, 1894)

Synonyms
- Maladera matrida Argaman, 1986; Serica insanabilis Brenske, 1894; Autoserica esfandiarii Petrovitz, 1970; Autoserica immutabilis Brenske, 1899; Autoserica insanabilis Brenske, 1899; Autoserica adjuncta Brenske, 1898

= Maladera insanabilis =

Species of beetle

Maladera insanabilis, sometimes colloquially called "Khomeini beetle", is a species of a beetle in the family Scarabaeidae. It is prevalent in Iran and other countries in the Middle-East.

Adults are active in the summer and in the spring. Males can be seen flying at night searching for females, and their attraction to light makes them a common household pest. Adults range in length from 7 to 9 mm and possess a brownish-red color.

== Distribution ==
It is found in Afghanistan, India (Himachal Pradesh, Jammu & Kashmir, Uttarakhand, Andhra Pradesh, Haryana, Punjab, Rajasthan, Uttar Pradesh), Iran, Iraq, Israel, Jordan, Kuwait, Libya, Morocco, Nepal, Oman, Pakistan, Palestine, Saudi Arabia, Qatar, Tunisia and the United Arab Emirates.

== Diet ==
The adult diet consists of leaves, buds and flowers of several plants like roses, sweet potato and citrus trees. The female lays between 60 and 100 eggs on the soil in clusters. The larval forms of M. insanabilis live underground. Their diet consists of roots and may cause serious damage to crops like sweet potato.

== Introduction to Israeli ecosystem and origin of name ==
The species was originally first described from India in 1894. It was dispersed to Iran in the 1960s, while it reached Israel in the 1980s. It is believed that a number of specimens arrived on shipments of pistachios and oil that were brought from Iran. Unaware that this beetle was already well-known elsewhere, an Israeli researcher mistakenly renamed it Maladera matrida, the new scientific name reflecting the nuisance it brings: "matrida" "מטרידה" means "bothersome" in Hebrew. Due to its Iranian origin and brown color ("חום khoom" in Hebrew), it is colloquially named 'Khomeini' after Iranian politician Ruhollah Khomeini, spiritual leader of Iran at the time the insect began spreading in Israel. This invasive species is distributed in the Arabian peninsula and northern Africa as well.

== See also ==
- Wildlife in Israel
