= Omorgus gemmatus =

Scientific classification
- Kingdom: Animalia
- Phylum: Arthropoda
- Clade: Pancrustacea
- Class: Insecta
- Order: Coleoptera
- Suborder: Polyphaga
- Infraorder: Scarabaeiformia
- Family: Trogidae
- Genus: Omorgus
- Species: O. gemmatus

Binomial name
- Omorgus gemmatus (Olivier, 1789)

Synonyms
- Trox gemmatus Olivier, 1789

Species of beetle

Omorgus gemmatus is a species of hide beetle in the subfamily Omorginae and subgenus Afromorgus.
