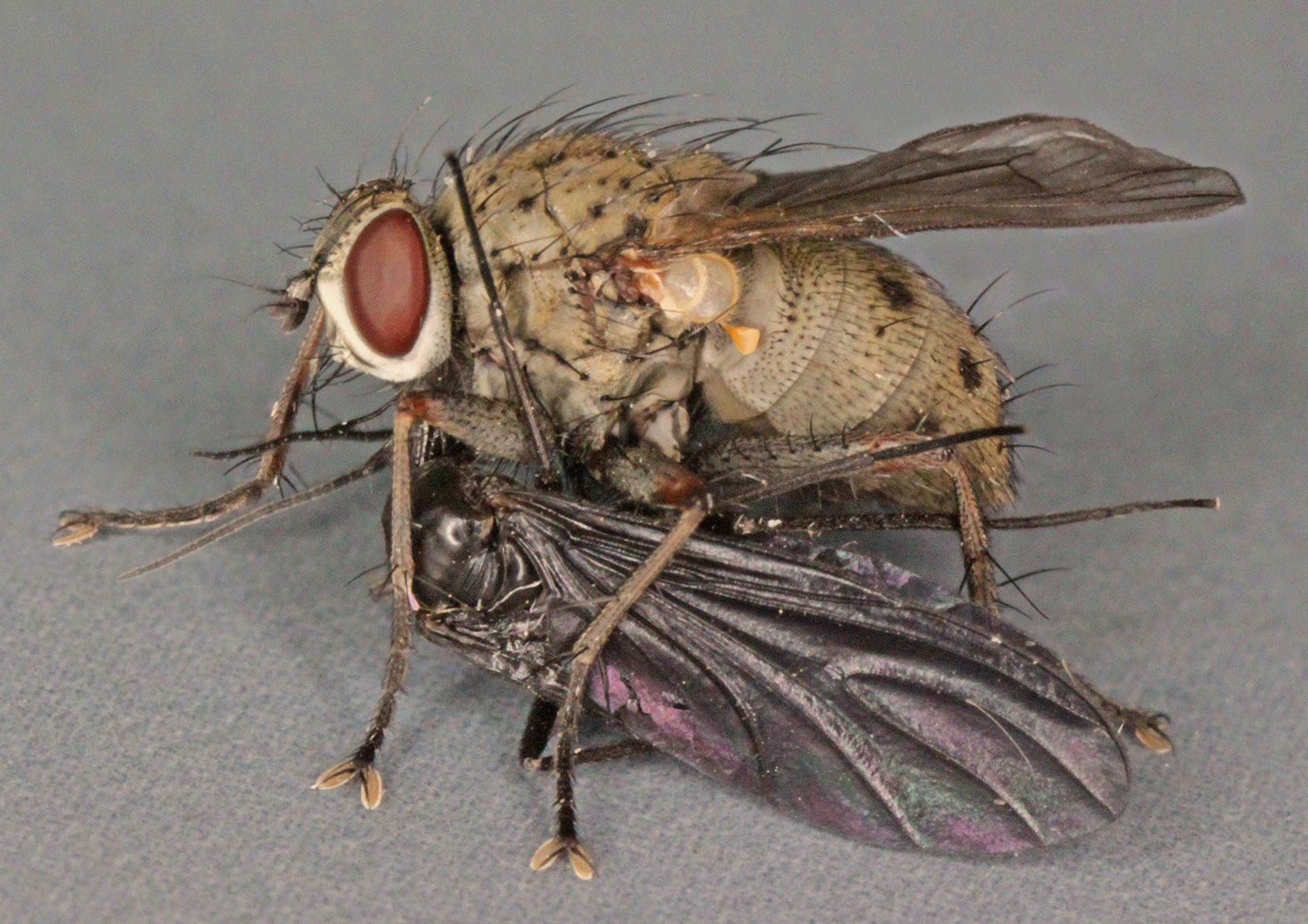
- Coenosia tigrina North Wales

Scientific classification
- Kingdom: Animalia
- Phylum: Arthropoda
- Clade: Pancrustacea
- Class: Insecta
- Order: Diptera
- Family: Muscidae
- Genus: Coenosia
- Species: C. tigrina

Binomial name
- Coenosia tigrina (Fabricius, 1775)

= Coenosia tigrina =

Species of fly

Coenosia tigrina, the hunter fly, killer fly, or common tiger fly, is a species of fly in the family Muscidae. Like other members of the genus, adults are predators that hunt flying insects, while larvae feed on earthworms. It is found in the Palearctic.
