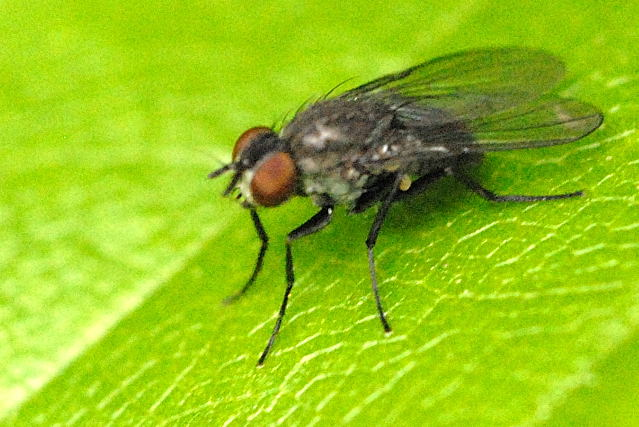

Scientific classification
- Kingdom: Animalia
- Phylum: Arthropoda
- Clade: Pancrustacea
- Class: Insecta
- Order: Diptera
- Family: Muscidae
- Genus: Coenosia
- Species: C. sexmaculata

Binomial name
- Coenosia sexmaculata Meigen, 1838

= Coenosia sexmaculata =

Species of fly

Coenosia sexmaculata is a fly from the family Muscidae.
