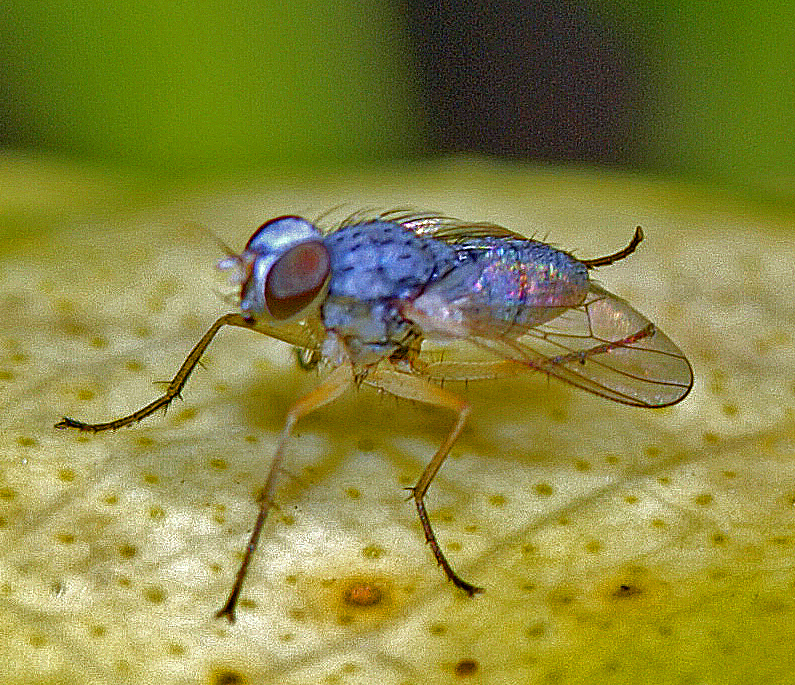
- Coenosia attenuata male

Scientific classification
- Kingdom: Animalia
- Phylum: Arthropoda
- Class: Insecta
- Order: Diptera
- Family: Muscidae
- Genus: Coenosia
- Species: C. attenuata

Binomial name
- Coenosia attenuata Stein, 1903

Synonyms
- Coenosia affinis Santos Abreu, 1976; Coenosia confalonierii Seguy, 1930; Coenosia flavicornis Schnabl & Dziedzicki, 1911; Coenosia flavipes Santos Abreu, 1976

= Coenosia attenuata =

Species of fly

Coenosia attenuata (also sometimes cited as Coenosia attenuate), commonly called "hunter fly" or well known under the name "killer fly", is a predatory fly belonging to the family Muscidae.

Video clip

== Distribution ==
This species is native to Southern Europe, where it is present in Spain, France, Italy, Germany and Greece. It has now a worldwide distribution and it can also be found in the Afrotropical realm, in the Australasian realm, in the East Palearctic realm, in the Near East, in the Nearctic realm, in the Neotropical realm, in North Africa and in the Oriental realm.

It was first discovered in the United States in 2001 by an Integrated Pest Management scout in a greenhouse in New York State. It has since been found throughout North and South America.

== Description ==
Adults of Coenosia attenuata can reach a length of 2.5–4 millimetres (0.098–0.157 in). These tiny killer flies have a pale brownish or greyish body, with big reddish eyes. Antennae and legs are yellow in males. Females have brownish frons, with a golden ocellar triangle. Antennae and femora are black and the abdomen shows distinct black bands, that are missing in the males.

== Biology ==
Coenosia attenuata is a very effective generalist predator of insects, usually small bugs (Bemisia tabaci, Trialeurodes vaporariorum, Bactericera cockerelli) and flies (Bradysia species, Liriomyza species, Drosophila species), but also small Hymenoptera (Encarsia formosa). Potential prey are caught only in mid-air with its front legs. The preferred prey in greenhouses are dark-winged fungus gnats (Sciaridae).

This species is considered an important biological control agent against some plant pests, including fruit flies and other common greenhouse pests. It has also shown promise as a biological control agent of fungus gnats and shore flies.
