= Labarrus digitatus =

Scientific classification
- Kingdom: Animalia
- Phylum: Arthropoda
- Clade: Pancrustacea
- Class: Insecta
- Order: Coleoptera
- Suborder: Polyphaga
- Infraorder: Scarabaeiformia
- Family: Scarabaeidae
- Genus: Labarrus
- Species: L. digitatus

Binomial name
- Labarrus digitatus (Harold, 1871)

Synonyms
- Aphodius digitatus Harold, 1871; Aphodius (Nialus) matthiesseni Reitter, 1907

Species of beetle

Labarrus digitatus is a species of beetle of the family Scarabaeidae. It is found in Afghanistan, Iran, Iraq, Israel, Syria and Turkey.

== Description ==
Adults reach a length of about 5.5–6 mm (0.22–0.24 in). They have an elongate-oval, moderately convex, highly glossy, glabrous, light yellowish-brown body, with the back of the head and a triangular discal spot on the pronotum, an ill-defined spot in the middle of the lateral margins, the edges of the scutellum, and the sutural margin of the elytra all darker brown. The legs are dark yellowish-brown.
