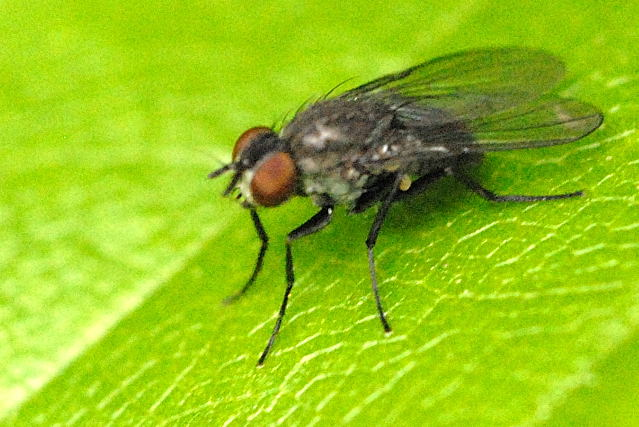
- Coenosia sexmaculata

Scientific classification
- Kingdom: Animalia
- Phylum: Arthropoda
- Clade: Pancrustacea
- Class: Insecta
- Order: Diptera
- Family: Muscidae
- Subfamily: Coenosiinae
- Tribe: Coenosiini; Verrall, 1890

= Coenosiini =

Tribe of flies

Schoenomyza litorella

Coenosiini is a tribe of flies from the family Muscidae.

== Genera ==
- Altimyia Couri, 2008
- Apsil Malloch, 1934
- Bithoracochaeta Stein, 1911
- Coenosia Meigen, 1826
- Cordiluroides Albuquerque, 1954
- Insulamyia Couri, 1982
- Limnospila Schnabl, 1902
- Lispocephala Pokorny, 1893
- Macrorchis Rondani, 1877
- Neodexiopsis Malloch, 1920
- Notoschoenomyza Malloch, 1934
- Orchisia Rondani, 1877
- Oxytonocera Stein, 1919
- Pentacricia Stein, 1898
- Pilispina Albuquerque, 1954
- Plumispina Albuquerque, 1954
- Pseudocoenosia Stein, 1916
- Reynoldsia Malloch, 1934
- Schoenomyza Haliday, 1833
- Schoenomyzina Malloch, 1934
- Spanochaeta Stein, 1919
- Spathipheromyia Bigot, 1884
- Stomopogon Malloch, 1930
