= Oxytachina setitibia =

Scientific classification
- Kingdom: Animalia
- Phylum: Arthropoda
- Class: Insecta
- Order: Diptera
- Family: Calliphoridae
- Subfamily: Rhinophorinae
- Tribe: Rhinophorini
- Genus: Oxytachina
- Species: O. setitibia

Binomial name
- Oxytachina setitibia (Crosskey, 1977)

Synonyms
- Rhinomorinia setitibia Crosskey, 1977

Species of fly

Oxytachina setitibia is a species of fly in the family Calliphoridae.

== Distribution ==
South Africa, Mozambique.
