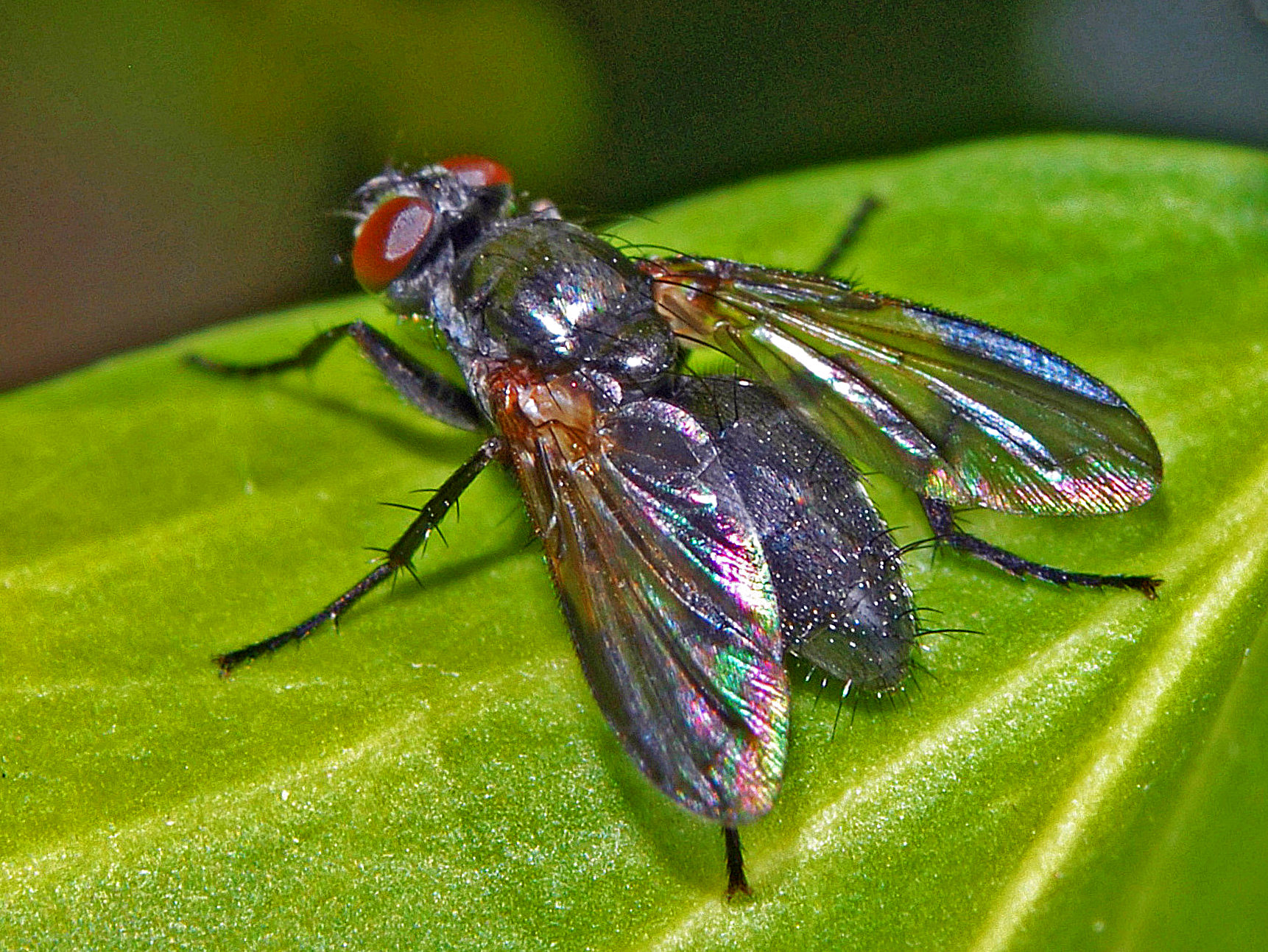

Scientific classification
- Kingdom: Animalia
- Phylum: Arthropoda
- Class: Insecta
- Order: Diptera
- Family: Calliphoridae
- Subfamily: Rhinophorinae
- Tribe: Phytonini
- Genus: Paykullia
- Species: P. maculata

Binomial name
- Paykullia maculata (Fallen, 1815)

Synonyms
- Melanophora ruficornis Macquart, 1855; Cuphocera ruficornis Macquart, 1845; Ocyptera maculata Fallén, 1815; Paykullia riparia Robineau-Desvoidy, 1830; Paykullia rubricornis Robineau-Desvoidy, 1830

= Paykullia maculata =

Species of fly

Paykullia maculata is a species of fly in the subfamily Rhinophorinae first described by Carl Fredrik Fallén in 1815.

== Distribution ==
This species can be found in most of Europe (Austria, Great Britain, Czech Republic, Denmark, France, Germany, Hungary, Ireland, Italy, Spain, Norway, Poland, Slovakia, Sweden, Switzerland, Netherlands) Habitats include wetlands, woodlands, parks and gardens.

== Description ==
Paykullia maculata can reach a length of 5–6 millimetres (0.20–0.24 in). The adults of this species are very variable, especially in size and in the pattern of wing markings. These small flies have a shining black body with bristly hair. The apical half of the wings show darkened veins and costal area.

== Biology ==
Adults can be seen from May to September, with several generations. Usually they rest or run around on stones or among the foliage. The larvae are intestinal parasites of Porcellio scaber and Oniscus asellus, and woodlice from Protracheoniscus and Trachelipus genera.
