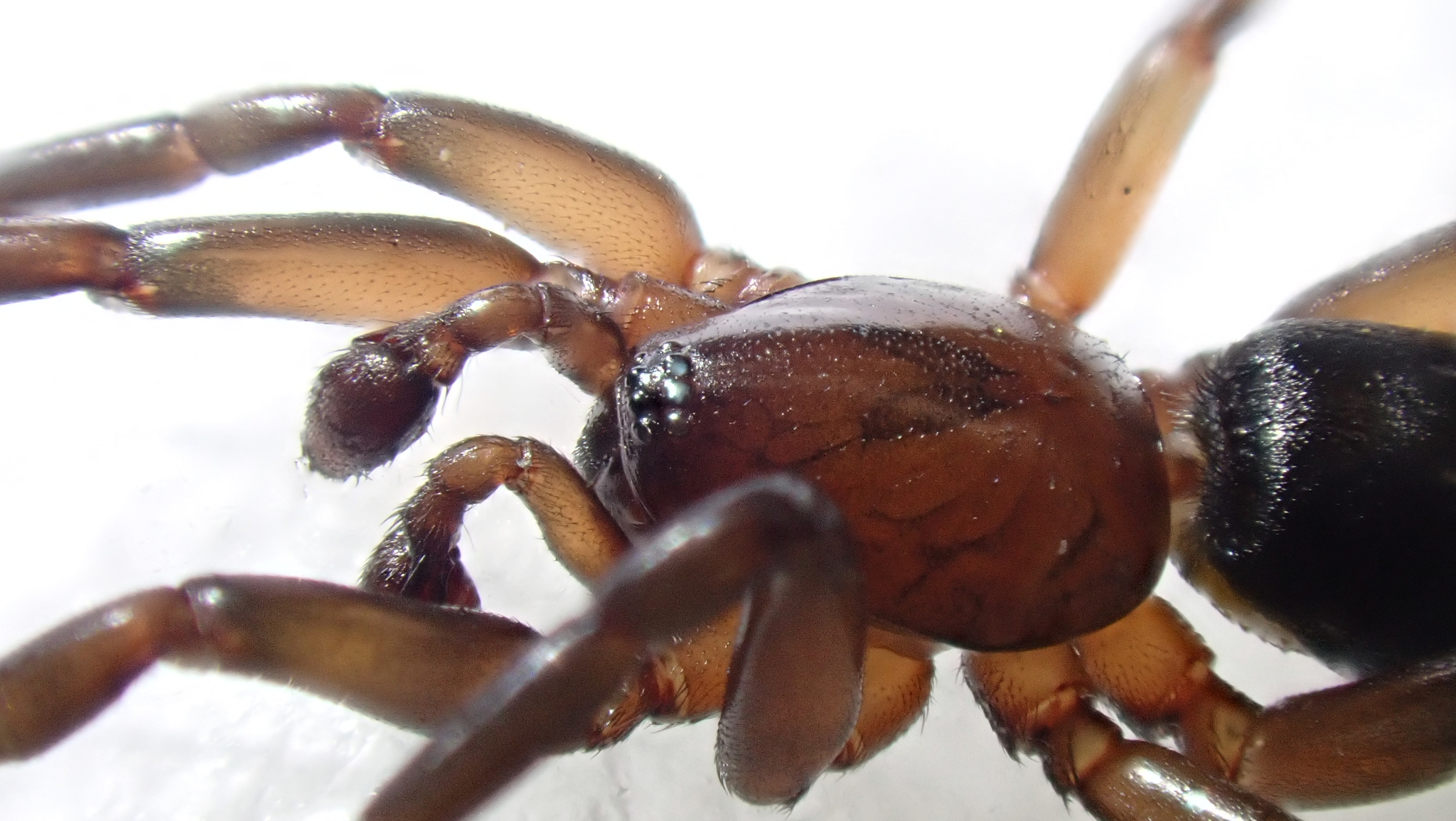
- male M. barbatus

Scientific classification
- Kingdom: Animalia
- Phylum: Arthropoda
- Subphylum: Chelicerata
- Class: Arachnida
- Order: Araneae
- Infraorder: Araneomorphae
- Family: Gnaphosidae
- Genus: Marinarozelotes; Ponomarev, 2020

Type species
- Melanophora barbata (L. Koch, 1866)

Species
- 23, see text

= Marinarozelotes =

Genus of spiders

Marinarozelotes is a genus of ground spiders first described by A. V. Ponomarev and V. Y. Shmatko in 2020. The type species, Marinarozelotes barbatus, was originally described under the name "Melanophora barbata".

== Species ==
As of October 2025, this genus includes 23 species:

- Marinarozelotes achaemenes Zamani, Chatzaki, Esyunin & Marusik, 2021 – Iran
- Marinarozelotes adriaticus (Caporiacco, 1951) – Italy to China
- Marinarozelotes ansimensis (Seo, 2002) – Korea
- Marinarozelotes baiyuensis (Xu, 1991) – China
- Marinarozelotes barbatus (L. Koch, 1866) – Mediterranean to Caucasus. Introduced to United States (type species)
- Marinarozelotes bardiae (Caporiacco, 1928) – Mediterranean
- Marinarozelotes chybyndensis (Tuneva & Esyunin, 2002) – Russia (Europe), Kazakhstan
- Marinarozelotes cumensis (Ponomarev, 1979) – Greece, Ukraine, Russia (Europe), Azerbaijan, Kazakhstan
- Marinarozelotes fuscipes (L. Koch, 1866) – Mediterranean, Iran, Kazakhstan, Uzbekistan, China
- Marinarozelotes glossus (Strand, 1915) – Turkey, Israel
- Marinarozelotes holosericeus (Simon, 1878) – Mediterranean
- Marinarozelotes huberti (Platnick & Murphy, 1984) – Algeria, Italy, Albania
- Marinarozelotes jaxartensis (Kroneberg, 1875) – Egypt, Cyprus, Russia (Europe), Caucasus, Israel, Oman, Iraq, Iran, Kazakhstan, Central Asia. Introduced to Hawaii, United States, Mexico, Ascension Is. Senegal, South Africa, India, China, Japan
- Marinarozelotes kulczynskii (Bösenberg, 1902) – North Macedonia, Bulgaria. Introduced to United States, Caribbean, Colombia, Brazil, Galapagos, Japan, Samoa
- Marinarozelotes lyonneti (Audouin, 1826) – Macaronesia, Mediterranean to Central Asia. Introduced to United States, Mexico, Peru, Brazil, St. Helena
- Marinarozelotes malkini (Platnick & Murphy, 1984) – Romania, Albania, North Macedonia, Bulgaria, Greece, Ukraine, Russia (Europe, Caucasus), Turkey, Georgia, Iran, Kazakhstan
- Marinarozelotes manytchensis (Ponomarev & Tsvetkov, 2006) – Ukraine, Russia (Europe)
- Marinarozelotes miniglossus (Levy, 2009) – Israel, Iran
- Marinarozelotes minutus (Crespo, 2010) – Portugal
- Marinarozelotes mutabilis (Simon, 1878) – Mediterranean, Romania
- Marinarozelotes ponticus Ponomarev, 2022 – Russia (Europe)
- Marinarozelotes ravidus (L. Koch, 1875) – Ethiopia
- Marinarozelotes stubbsi (Platnick & Murphy, 1984) – Greece, Cyprus, Israel

== See also ==
- Trachyzelotes
- Zelotes
