= Stevenia =

Stevenia is the scientific name of two genera of organisms and may refer to:

- Stevenia (fly), a genus of insects in the family Rhinophoridae
- Stevenia (plant), a genus of plants in the family Brassicaceae
