= Tromodesia vibripennis =

Scientific classification
- Kingdom: Animalia
- Phylum: Arthropoda
- Class: Insecta
- Order: Diptera
- Family: Calliphoridae
- Subfamily: Rhinophorinae
- Tribe: Rhinophorini
- Genus: Tromodesia
- Species: T. vibripennis

Binomial name
- Tromodesia vibripennis Rondani, 1856

Synonyms
- Morinia trifasciata Strobl, 1900; Morinia tricingulata Strobl, 1902

Species of fly

Tromodesia vibripennis is a species of fly in the family Calliphoridae.

== Distribution ==
Austria, Italy
