= Shannoniella cuspidata =

Scientific classification
- Kingdom: Animalia
- Phylum: Arthropoda
- Class: Insecta
- Order: Diptera
- Family: Calliphoridae
- Subfamily: Rhinophorinae
- Tribe: Rhinophorini
- Genus: Shannoniella
- Species: S. cuspidata

Binomial name
- Shannoniella cuspidata Townsend, 1939

Species of fly

Shannoniella cuspidata is a species of fly in the family Calliphoridae.

== Distribution ==
Brazil
