= Oplisa tergestina =

Scientific classification
- Kingdom: Animalia
- Phylum: Arthropoda
- Class: Insecta
- Order: Diptera
- Family: Calliphoridae
- Subfamily: Rhinophorinae
- Tribe: Rhinophorini
- Genus: Oplisa
- Species: O. tergestina

Binomial name
- Oplisa tergestina (Schiner, 1861)

Synonyms
- Morinia tergestina Schiner, 1861; Oplisa mendica Rondani, 1862

Species of fly

Oplisa tergestina is a genus of flies in the family Calliphoridae.

== Distribution ==
Czech Republic, Germany, Hungary, Italy, Poland, Romania, Slovakia, Switzerland, Ukraine.
