= Acompomintho lobata =

Scientific classification
- Kingdom: Animalia
- Phylum: Arthropoda
- Class: Insecta
- Order: Diptera
- Family: Calliphoridae
- Subfamily: Rhinophorinae
- Tribe: Rhinophorini
- Genus: Acompomintho
- Species: A. lobata

Binomial name
- Acompomintho lobata Villeneuve, 1927

Synonyms
- Wagneriopsis formosensis Townsend, 1927

Species of fly

Acompomintho lobata is a species of fly in the family Calliphoridae.

== Distribution ==
Taiwan
