= Melanomyoides =

Scientific classification
- Kingdom: Animalia
- Phylum: Arthropoda
- Class: Insecta
- Order: Diptera
- Family: Calliphoridae
- Subfamily: Rhinophorinae
- Tribe: Rhinophorini
- Genus: Melanomyoides; Crosskey, 1977

Type species
- Chaetostevenia capenis Zumpt, 1959

Genus of flies

Melanomyoides is a genus of flies in the family Calliphoridae.

== Species ==
- Melanomyoides capensis (Zumpt, 1959)

== Distribution ==
South Africa.
