= Zelotes lightfooti =

Lightfoot's Dark Ground Spider

Conservation status
- Least Concern (SANBI Red List)

Scientific classification
- Kingdom: Animalia
- Phylum: Arthropoda
- Subphylum: Chelicerata
- Class: Arachnida
- Order: Araneae
- Infraorder: Araneomorphae
- Family: Gnaphosidae
- Genus: Zelotes
- Species: Z. lightfooti

Binomial name
- Zelotes lightfooti (Purcell, 1907)

Synonyms
- Melanophora lightfooti Purcell, 1907; Zelotes ornatus Tucker, 1923

Species of spider

Zelotes lightfooti is a species of spider in the family Gnaphosidae. It is endemic to South Africa and is commonly known as the lightfoot's dark ground spider.

== Distribution ==
Zelotes lightfooti has been recorded from four South African provinces: Eastern Cape, Limpopo, Mpumalanga, and Western Cape. The species occurs at altitudes ranging from 249 to 2,040 m above sea level.

== Habitat and ecology ==
Zelotes lightfooti are free-running spiders found under stones during the day. The species has been sampled from the Fynbos, Nama Karoo, Grassland, and Savanna biomes.

== Conservation ==
Zelotes lightfooti is listed as Least Concern by the South African National Biodiversity Institute due to its wide range. There are no significant threats to the species, and it is protected in Verlorenvallei Nature Reserve, Anysberg Nature Reserve, and Witteberg Nature Reserve.

== Taxonomy ==
The species was originally described by William Frederick Purcell in 1907 from Ceres in the Western Cape as Melanophora lightfooti. FitzPatrick's 2007 revision synonymized Zelotes ornatus Tucker, 1923 with Z. lightfooti. The species is known only from the female.
