= Oxytachina =

Scientific classification
- Kingdom: Animalia
- Phylum: Arthropoda
- Class: Insecta
- Order: Diptera
- Family: Calliphoridae
- Subfamily: Rhinophorinae
- Tribe: Rhinophorini
- Genus: Oxytachina; Brauer & von Berganstamm, 1891

Type species
- Oxytachina vittata Brauer & von Berganstamm, 1891

Genus of flies

Oxytachina is a genus of flies in the family Calliphoridae.

== Species ==
- Oxytachina approximata (Crosskey, 1977)
- Oxytachina atra (Bischof, 1904)
- Oxytachina bisetosa (Crosskey, 1977)
- Oxytachina capensis (Brauer & von Berganstamm, 1893)
- Oxytachina scutellata (Crosskey, 1977)
- Oxytachina setitibia (Crosskey, 1977)
- Oxytachina verticalis (Crosskey, 1977)
- Oxytachina vittata Brauer & von Berganstamm, 1891
- Oxytachina xanthocephala (Bezzi, 1908)
