= Ameniamima =

Scientific classification
- Kingdom: Animalia
- Phylum: Arthropoda
- Clade: Pancrustacea
- Class: Insecta
- Order: Diptera
- Family: Tachinidae
- Genus: Rutilia
- Subgenus: Ameniamima; Crosskey, 1973

Type species
- Rutilia argentifera Bigot, 1874

Subgenus of flies

Ameniamima is a subgenus of flies in the family Tachinidae.

== Species ==
- Rutilia argentifera Bigot, 1874
- Rutilia cingulata (Malloch, 1930)
- Rutilia quadripunctata (Malloch, 1930)

== Distribution ==
Australia.
