= Donovanius =

Scientific classification
- Kingdom: Animalia
- Phylum: Arthropoda
- Clade: Pancrustacea
- Class: Insecta
- Order: Diptera
- Family: Tachinidae
- Genus: Rutilia
- Subgenus: Donovanius; Enderlein, 1936

Type species
- Rutilia regalis Guerin-Meneville, 1831

Synonyms
- Menevillea Enderlein, 1936

Subgenus of flies

Donovanius is a subgenus of flies in the family Tachinidae.

== Species ==
- Rutilia agalmiodes (Enderlein, 1936)
- Rutilia analoga Macquart, 1851
- Rutilia bisetosa (Enderlein, 1936)
- Rutilia brunneipennis (Crosskey, 1973)
- Rutilia ethoda (Enderlein, 1849)
- Rutilia inusta (Wiedemann, 1830)
- Rutilia lepida Guerin-Meneville, 1843
- Rutilia nigrihirta Malloch, 1935
- Rutilia pellucens Macquart, 1846
- Rutilia regalis Guerin-Meneville, 1831
- Rutilia retusa (Fabricius, 1775)
- Rutilia sabrata (Walker, 1849)
- Rutilia savaiiensis Malloch, 1935
- Rutilia spinolae Rondani, 1864
- Rutilia viridinigra Macquart, 1846
