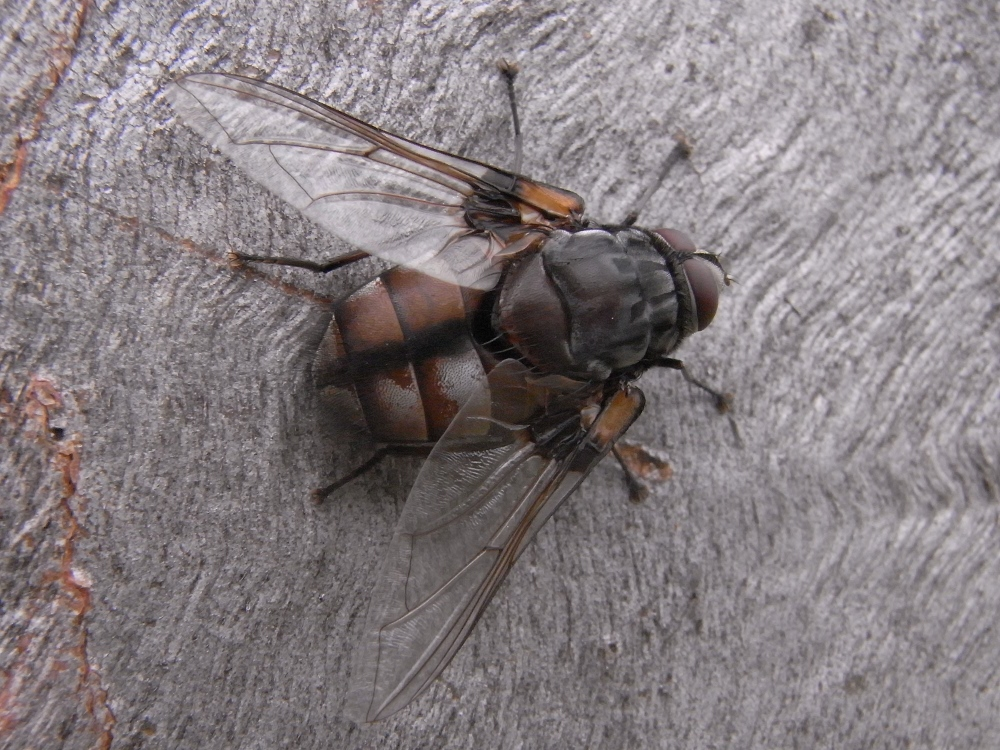
- Rutilia vivipara (?)

Scientific classification
- Kingdom: Animalia
- Phylum: Arthropoda
- Class: Insecta
- Order: Diptera
- Family: Tachinidae
- Subfamily: Dexiinae
- Tribe: Rutiliini
- Genus: Rutilia; Robineau-Desvoidy, 1830

Type species
- Rutilia vivipara Fabricius, 1805

= Rutilia =

Genus of flies

Rutilia is a large genus of medium to large (>20mm) flies in the family Tachinidae native to Australia and the Oriental region, though notably absent from New Zealand. Like the vast majority of tachinid flies, Rutilia species are parasitoids of other insects, specifically Rutilia are known to be parasitoids of late instar larvae of scarab beetles.

== Subgenera and species ==
Rutilia is a large genus comprising seven subgenera.

- Rutilia (Ameniamima) Crosskey, 1973
  - Rutilia argentifera Bigot, 1874 (Subgenus Type)
  - Rutilia cingulata (Malloch, 1930)
  - Rutilia quadripunctata (Malloch, 1930)
- Rutilia (Chrysorutilia) Townsend, 1915
  - Rutilia atrox (Enderlein, 1936)
  - Rutilia caeruleata (Enderlein, 1936)
  - Rutilia caesia (Enderlein, 1930)
  - Rutilia chersipho (Walker, 1849)
  - Rutilia corona Curran, 1930
  - Rutilia cryptica Crosskey, 1973
  - Rutilia decora Guerin-Meneville, 1843
  - Rutilia formosa Robineau-Desvoidy, 1830 (Subgenus Type)
  - Rutilia goerlingiana (Enderlein, 1936)
  - Rutilia idesa (Walker, 1849)
  - Rutilia imperialis Guerin-Meneville, 1843
  - Rutilia imperialoides (Crosskey, 1973)
  - Rutilia luzona (Enderlein, 1936)
  - Rutilia nana (Enderlein, 1936)
  - Rutilia panthea (Walker, 1874)
  - Rutilia rubriceps Macquart, 1847
  - Rutilia splendida (Donovan, 1805)
  - Rutilia townsendi Crosskey, 1973
  - Rutilia transversa Malloch, 1936
- Rutilia (Donovanius) Enderlein, 1936
  - Rutilia agalmiodes (Enderlein, 1936)
  - Rutilia analoga Macquart, 1851
  - Rutilia bisetosa (Enderlein, 1936)
  - Rutilia brunneipennis (Crosskey, 1973)
  - Rutilia ethoda (Enderlein, 1849)
  - Rutilia inusta (Wiedemann, 1830)
  - Rutilia lepida Guerin-Meneville, 1843
  - Rutilia nigrihirta Malloch, 1935
  - Rutilia pellucens Macquart, 1846
  - Rutilia regalis Guerin-Meneville, 1831 (Subgenus Type)
  - Rutilia retusa (Fabricius, 1775)
  - Rutilia sabrata (Walker, 1849)
  - Rutilia savaiiensis Malloch, 1935
  - Rutilia spinolae Rondani, 1864
  - Rutilia viridinigra Macquart, 1846
- Rutilia (Grapholostylum) Macquart, 1851
  - Rutilia albovirida Malloch, 1929
  - Rutilia dorsomaculata (Macquart, 1851) (Subgenus Type)
  - Rutilia micans Malloch, 1929
  - Rutilia subtustomentosa Macquart, 1851
- Rutilia (Microrutilia) Townsend, 1915
  - Rutilia cupreiventris Malloch, 1936
  - Rutilia fulviventris Bigot, 1874
  - Rutilia hirticeps Malloch, 1929
  - Rutilia liris (Walker, 1849)
  - Rutilia media Macquart, 1846
  - Rutilia minor Macquart, 1846 (Subgenus Type)
  - Rutilia nigriceps Malloch, 1929
  - Rutilia nigripes (Enderlein, 1936)
- Rutilia (Neorutilia) Malloch, 1936
  - Rutilia simplex Malloch, 1936 (Subgenus Type)
- Rutilia (Rutilia) Robineau-Desvoidy, 1830
  - Rutilia confusa (Malloch, 1929)
  - Rutilia dentata Crosskey, 1973
  - Rutilia setosa Malloch, 1929
  - Rutilia vivipara (Fabricius, 1805) (Genus Type species)
