= Ventrops =

Scientific classification
- Kingdom: Animalia
- Phylum: Arthropoda
- Class: Insecta
- Order: Diptera
- Family: Calliphoridae
- Subfamily: Rhinophorinae
- Tribe: Rhinophorini
- Genus: Ventrops; Crosskey, 1977

Type species
- Ventrops milichioides Crosskey, 1977

Genus of flies

Ventrops is a genus of flies in the family Calliphoridae.

== Species ==
- Ventrops aethiopicus Cerretti & Pape, 2012
- Ventrops freidbergi Cerretti & Pape, 2012
- Ventrops hannemariae Pape, 1987
- Ventrops incisus Pape, 1987
- Ventrops intermedius Pape, 1987
- Ventrops milichioides Crosskey, 1977
- Ventrops stuckenbergi Cerretti & Pape, 2012
- Ventrops vikhrevi Cerretti, Ziegler & Pape, 2014
