= Torocca abdominalis =

Scientific classification
- Kingdom: Animalia
- Phylum: Arthropoda
- Class: Insecta
- Order: Diptera
- Family: Tachinidae
- Subfamily: Dexiinae
- Tribe: Doleschallini
- Genus: Torocca
- Species: T. abdominalis

Binomial name
- Torocca abdominalis Walker, 1859

Species of fly

Torocca abdominalis is a species of fly in the family Tachinidae.

== Distribution ==
Sulawesi.
