= Torocca munda =

Scientific classification
- Kingdom: Animalia
- Phylum: Arthropoda
- Class: Insecta
- Order: Diptera
- Family: Tachinidae
- Subfamily: Dexiinae
- Tribe: Doleschallini
- Genus: Torocca
- Species: T. munda

Binomial name
- Torocca munda (Walker, 1856)

Synonyms
- Dexia munda Walker, 1856

Species of fly

Torocca munda is a species of fly in the family Tachinidae.

== Distribution ==
Japan, India, Borneo, Java, Sumatra, Malaysia, China, Thailand, Vietnam.
