= Doleschalla cylindrica =

Scientific classification
- Kingdom: Animalia
- Phylum: Arthropoda
- Class: Insecta
- Order: Diptera
- Family: Tachinidae
- Subfamily: Dexiinae
- Tribe: Doleschallini
- Genus: Doleschalla
- Species: D. cylindrica

Binomial name
- Doleschalla cylindrica Walker, 1861

Synonyms
- Dexia cylindrica Walker, 1861; Doleschalla consors Walker, 1864; Doleschalla gonypedoides Walker, 1864; Doleschalla venosa Bigot, 1888

Species of fly

Doleschalla cylindrica is a species of fly in the family Tachinidae.

== Distribution ==
Indonesia, Solomon Islands.
