= Comoromyia =

Scientific classification
- Kingdom: Animalia
- Phylum: Arthropoda
- Class: Insecta
- Order: Diptera
- Family: Calliphoridae
- Subfamily: Rhinophorinae
- Tribe: Phytonini
- Genus: Comoromyia; Crosskey, 1977

Type species
- Comoromyia griseithorax Crosskey, 1977

Genus of flies

Comoromyia is a genus of flies in the family Calliphoridae.

== Species ==
- Comoromyia griseithorax Crosskey, 1977

== Distribution ==
Comoro Islands.
