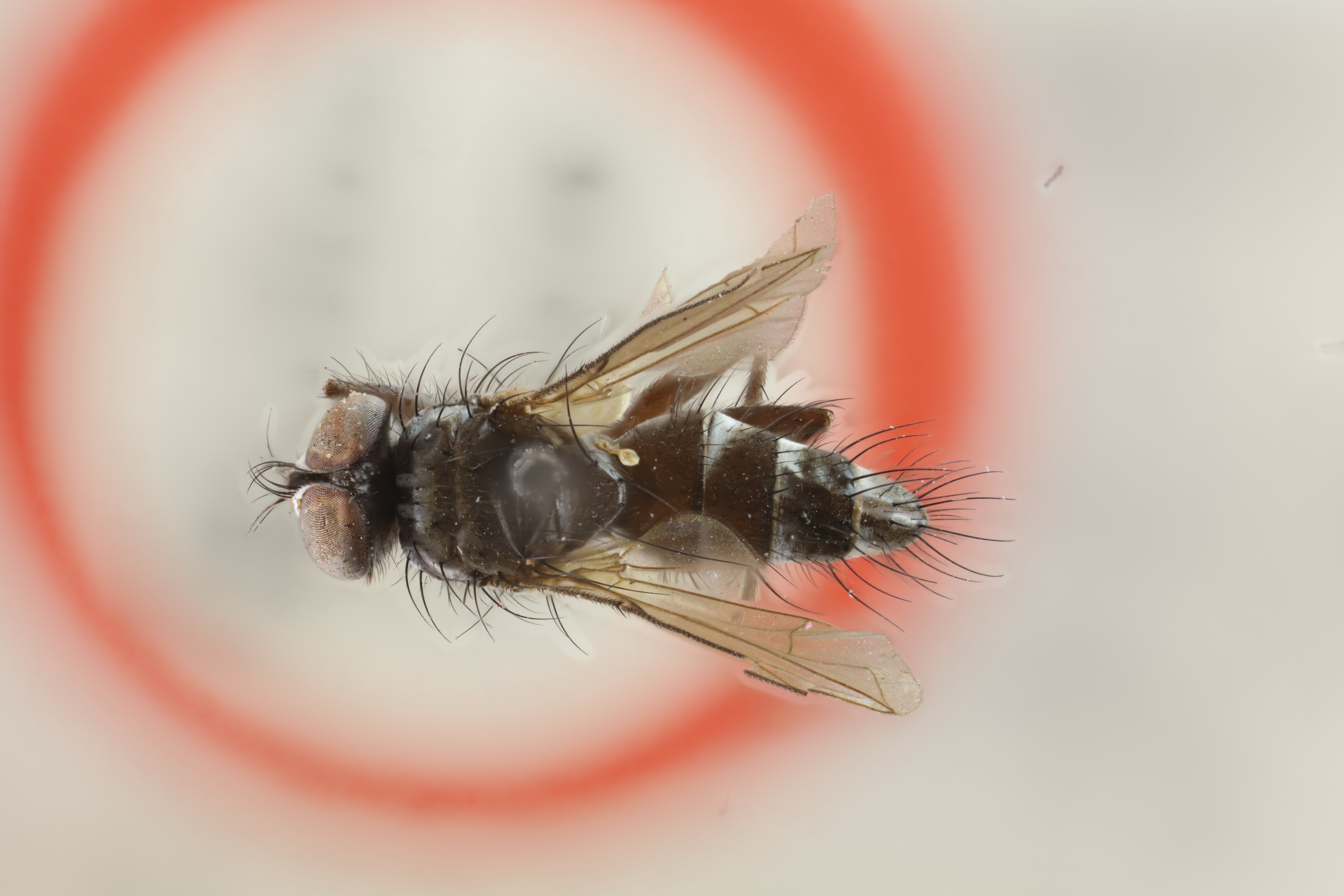
- Phyto parafacialis

Scientific classification
- Kingdom: Animalia
- Phylum: Arthropoda
- Class: Insecta
- Order: Diptera
- Family: Calliphoridae
- Subfamily: Rhinophorinae
- Tribe: Phytonini
- Genus: Phyto; Robineau-Desvoidy, 1830

Type species
- Phyto nigra Robineau-Desvoidy, 1830

Synonyms
- Britea Curran, 1927; Cirillia Rondani, 1856; Cyrillia Bezzi, 1907; Diprodexia Séguy, 1935; Kockia Robineau-Desvoidy, 1863; Metopisena Rondani, 1862; Metopostena Bezzi, 1906; Paramorinia Brauer & von Berganstamm, 1891; Phito Rondani, 1861; Protachaeta Enderlein, 1936; Savia Rondani, 1861; Semitachina Portschinsky, 1883; Styloneuria Brauer & von Berganstamm, 1891

= Phyto (fly) =

Genus of flies

Phyto is a genus of flies in the family Rhinophoridae.

== Species ==
- Phyto abbreviata Villeneuve, 1920
- Phyto adolescens Rondani, 1861
- Phyto anatolica Zeegers, 2011
- Phyto angustifrons (Rondani, 1856)
- Phyto armadillonis Kugler, 1978
- Phyto atrior (Villeneuve, 1941)
- Phyto brevipila Herting, 1961
- Phyto celer (Rondani, 1862)
- Phyto cingulata (Zetterstedt, 1844)
- Phyto discrepans Pandellé, 1896
- Phyto fernandezyepezi Báez, 1988
- Phyto hertingi Báez, 1979
- Phyto latifrons Kugler, 1978
- Phyto lechevalieri (Séguy, 1935)
- Phyto luteisquama Kugler, 1978
- Phyto mambilla Gisondi, Pape, Shima & Cerretti, 2020
- Phyto melanocephala (Meigen, 1824)
- Phyto nigrobarbata (Becker, 1908)
- Phyto parafacialis Crosskey, 1977
- Phyto paratachinoides Crosskey, 1977
- Phyto pauciseta Herting, 1961
- Phyto pilicornis (Villeneuve, 1920)
- Phyto similis Stein, 1924
- Phyto sordidisquama Villeneuve, 1920
- Phyto subalbida Herting, 1961
- Phyto tachinoides (Curran, 1927)
