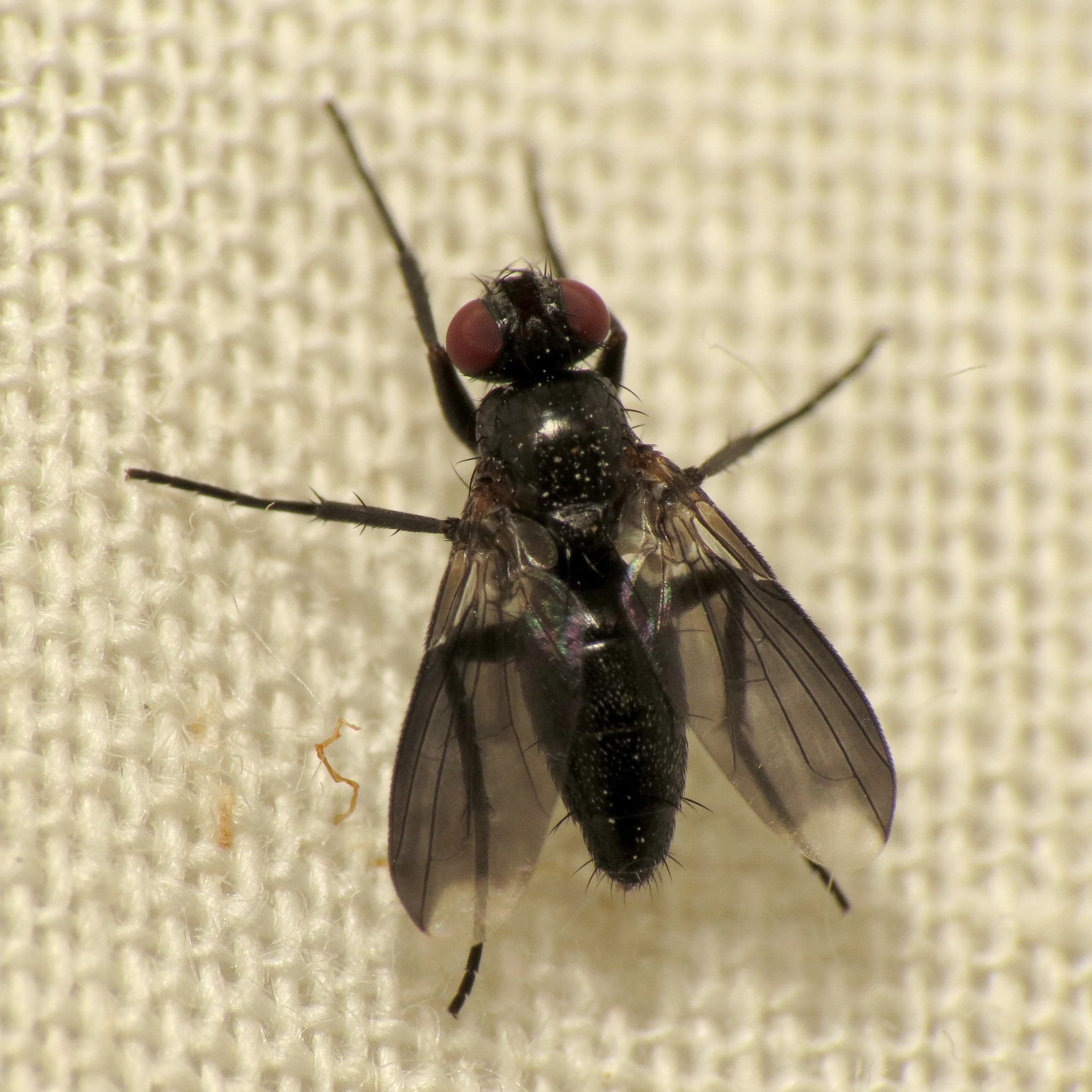
- female

Scientific classification
- Kingdom: Animalia
- Phylum: Arthropoda
- Class: Insecta
- Order: Diptera
- Family: Calliphoridae
- Subfamily: Rhinophorinae
- Tribe: Phytonini
- Genus: Melanophora
- Species: M. roralis

Binomial name
- Melanophora roralis (Linnaeus, 1758)

Synonyms
- Illigeria atra Robineau-Desvoidy, 1830; Illigeria brasiliensis Robineau-Desvoidy, 1863; Illigeria minor Robineau-Desvoidy, 1830; Melanophora americana Macquart, 1844; Melanophora appendiculata Macquart, 1855; Melanophora atra Robineau-Desvoidy, 1830; Melanophora distincta Robineau-Desvoidy, 1830; Melanophora festiva Robineau-Desvoidy, 1830; Melanophora nigerrima Macquart, 1834; Melanophora nitidiventris Curran, 1928; Melanophora stygia Harris, 1835; Melanophora violacea Robineau-Desvoidy, 1830; Musca atra Devillers, 1789; Musca grossificationis Linnaeus, 1758; Musca interventum Harris, 1780; Musca roralis Linnaeus, 1758; Tachina interlapsa Walker, 1853; Tachina plumigera Wiedemann, 1830

= Melanophora roralis =

Species of fly

Melanophora roralis is a species of woodlouse fly in the family Calliphoridae.

== Description ==
M. roralis is 3–5.5 millimetres (0.12–0.22 in) long, black in colour with hairy antennae and a shiny thorax.

== Distribution ==
It was introduced to North America from Europe and can be found from Southern Ontario to Chile and Argentina.

== Ecology ==
Species fly from mid-May to October and inhabit old forests and damp areas near the shore. The females of this species have a distinctive white spots at the tips of their wings and lay from 189 to 238 eggs in 6.5 to 7.5 hours. It takes up to 21 days for the species' to pupate. It is a parasite of Porcellio scaber.
