= Rutilia (subgenus) =

Scientific classification
- Kingdom: Animalia
- Phylum: Arthropoda
- Clade: Pancrustacea
- Class: Insecta
- Order: Diptera
- Family: Tachinidae
- Genus: Rutilia
- Subgenus: Rutilia; Robineau-Desvoidy, 1830

Type species
- Tachina vivipara Fabricius, 1805

Synonyms
- Psaroniella Enderlein, 1936; Stiraulax Enderlein, 1936

Subgenus of flies

Rutilia is a subgenus of flies in the family Tachinidae. It is found in Australia.

== Species ==
- Rutilia confusa (Malloch, 1929)
- Rutilia dentata Crosskey, 1973
- Rutilia setosa Malloch, 1929
- Rutilia vivipara (Fabricius, 1805)
