= Chrysorutilia =

Scientific classification
- Kingdom: Animalia
- Phylum: Arthropoda
- Clade: Pancrustacea
- Class: Insecta
- Order: Diptera
- Family: Tachinidae
- Genus: Rutilia
- Subgenus: Chrysorutilia; Townsend, 1915

Type species
- Rutilia formosa Robineau-Desvoidy, 1830

Synonyms
- Philippoformosia Townsend, 1927; Habrota Enderlein, 1936; Zoramsceus Enderlein, 1936; Idania Enderlein, 1936; Formotilia Paramonov, 1968

Subgenus of flies

Chrysorutilia is a subgenus of flies in the family Tachinidae.

== Species ==
- Rutilia atrox (Enderlein, 1936)
- Rutilia caeruleata (Enderlein, 1936)
- Rutilia caesia (Enderlein, 1930)
- Rutilia chersipho (Walker, 1849)
- Rutilia corona Curran, 1930
- Rutilia cryptica Crosskey, 1973
- Rutilia decora Guerin-Meneville, 1843
- Rutilia formosa Robineau-Desvoidy, 1830
- Rutilia goerlingiana (Enderlein, 1936)
- Rutilia idesa (Walker, 1849)
- Rutilia imperialis Guerin-Meneville, 1843
- Rutilia imperialoides (Crosskey, 1973)
- Rutilia luzona (Enderlein, 1936)
- Rutilia nana (Enderlein, 1936)
- Rutilia panthea (Walker, 1874)
- Rutilia rubriceps Macquart, 1847
- Rutilia splendida (Donovan, 1805)
- Rutilia townsendi Crosskey, 1973
- Rutilia transversa Malloch, 1936
