= Torocca =

Scientific classification
- Kingdom: Animalia
- Phylum: Arthropoda
- Class: Insecta
- Order: Diptera
- Family: Tachinidae
- Subfamily: Dexiinae
- Tribe: Doleschallini
- Genus: Torocca; Walker, 1859

Type species
- Torocca abdominalis Walker, 1859

Synonyms
- Eutorocca Townsend, 1919; Prosophia Townsend, 1927

Genus of flies

Torocca is a genus of flies in the family Tachinidae.

== Species ==
- Torocca abdominalis Walker, 1859
- Torocca fasciata (Townsend, 1919)
- Torocca kloofia (Townsend, 1927)
- Torocca munda (Walker, 1856)
- Torocca pollinosa Crosskey, 1963
