= Queximyia =

Scientific classification
- Kingdom: Animalia
- Phylum: Arthropoda
- Class: Insecta
- Order: Diptera
- Family: Calliphoridae
- Subfamily: Rhinophorinae
- Tribe: Rhinophorini
- Genus: Queximyia; Crosskey, 1977

Type species
- Queximyia flavipes Crosskey, 1977

Genus of flies

Queximyia is a genus of flies in the family Calliphoridae.

== Species ==
- Queximyia flavipes Crosskey, 1977

== Distribution ==
South Africa.
