= Rutilia vivipara =

Scientific classification
- Kingdom: Animalia
- Phylum: Arthropoda
- Clade: Pancrustacea
- Class: Insecta
- Order: Diptera
- Family: Tachinidae
- Genus: Rutilia
- Subgenus: Rutilia
- Species: R. vivipara

Binomial name
- Rutilia vivipara (Fabricius, 1805)

Synonyms
- Tachina vivipara Fabricius, 1805

Species of fly

Rutilia vivipara is a species of fly in the family Tachinidae.

== Distribution ==
Australia.
