= Azaisia =

Scientific classification
- Kingdom: Animalia
- Phylum: Arthropoda
- Class: Insecta
- Order: Diptera
- Family: Calliphoridae
- Subfamily: Rhinophorinae
- Tribe: Rhinophorini
- Genus: Azaisia; Villeneuve, 1939

Type species
- Azaisia setitarsis Villeneuve, 1939

Synonyms
- Azaisiella Villeneuve, 1939

Genus of flies

Azaisia is a genus of flies in the family Calliphoridae.

== Species ==
- Azaisia obscura Villeneuve, 1939
- Azaisia setitarsis Villeneuve, 1939

== Distribution ==
Madeira.
