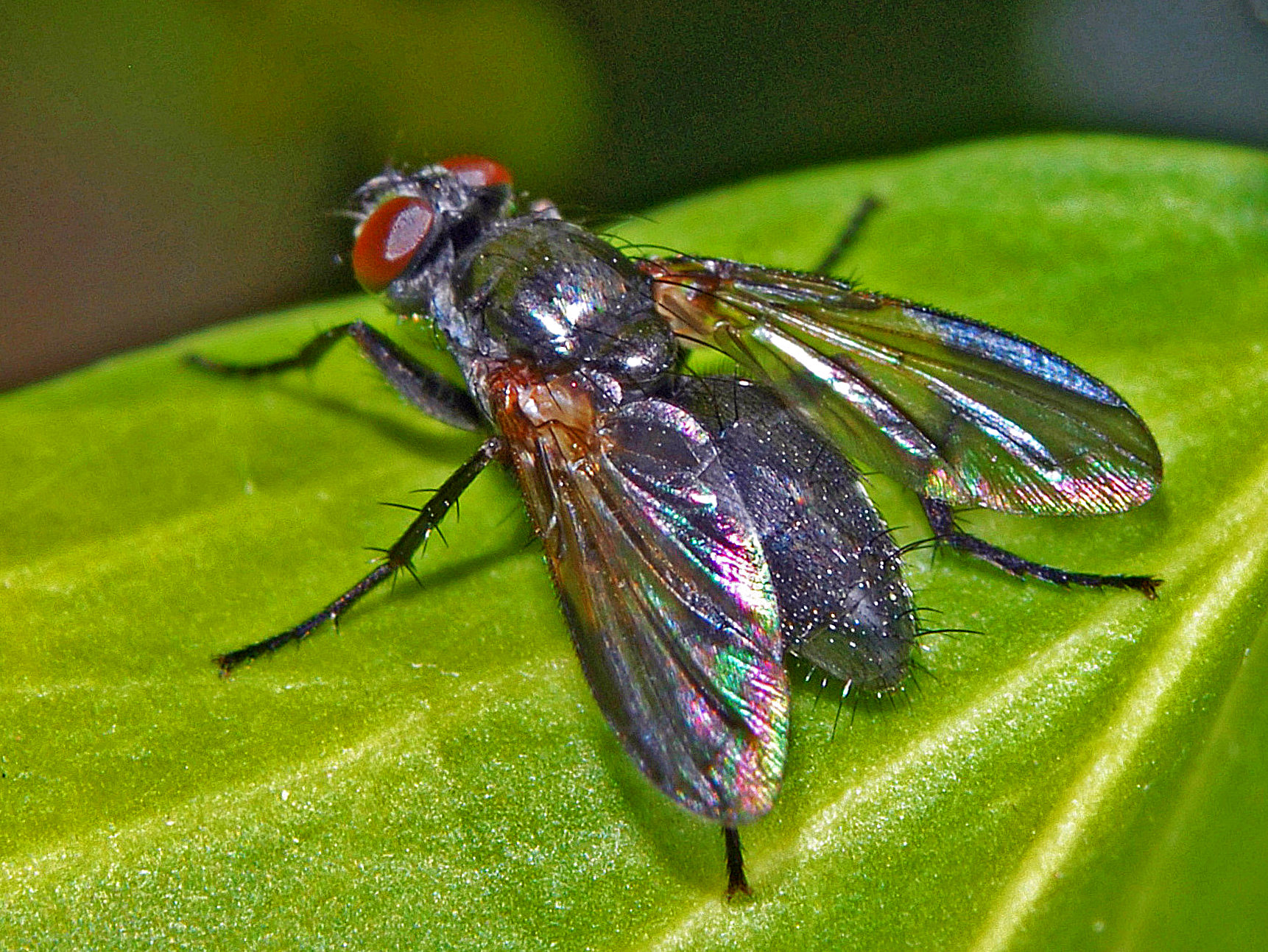
- Paykullia maculata

Scientific classification
- Kingdom: Animalia
- Phylum: Arthropoda
- Class: Insecta
- Order: Diptera
- Family: Calliphoridae
- Subfamily: Rhinophorinae
- Tribe: Phytonini
- Genus: Paykullia; Robineau-Desvoidy, 1830

Type species
- Paykullia rubricornis Robineau-Desvoidy, 1830

Synonyms
- Chaetostevenia Brauer, 1895; Euplesina Wainwright, 1933; Parafeburia Townsend, 1933; Paykulia Schiner, 1868

= Paykullia =

Genus of flies

Paykullia is a genus of flies in the family Calliphoridae.

== Species ==
- Paykullia braueri (Strobl, 1895)
- Paykullia brevicornis (Zetterstedt, 1844)
- Paykullia carmela (Peris, 1963)
- Paykullia insularis (Villeneuve, 1911)
- Paykullia kugleri (Herting, 1961)
- Paykullia maculata (Fallén, 1815)
- Paykullia nubilipennis (Loew, 1847)
- Paykullia partenopea (Rondani, 1861)
