= Tricogena =

Scientific classification
- Kingdom: Animalia
- Phylum: Arthropoda
- Class: Insecta
- Order: Diptera
- Family: Calliphoridae
- Subfamily: Rhinophorinae
- Tribe: Rhinophorini
- Genus: Tricogena; Rondani, 1856

Synonyms
- Frauenfeldia Egger, 1865; Talmonia Robineau-Desvoidy, 1863; Thricogena Neave, 1940

Genus of flies

Tricogena is a genus of flies in the family Calliphoridae.

== Species ==
- Tricogena rubricosa (Meigen, 1824)

== Distribution ==
Belgium, Czech Republic, Denmark, Finland, France, Germany, Ireland, Italy, Morocco, Norway, Poland, Portugal, Russia, Slovakia, Spain, Sweden, Switzerland, Tunisia, Ukraine, United Kingdom.
