= Trypetidomima =

Scientific classification
- Kingdom: Animalia
- Phylum: Arthropoda
- Class: Insecta
- Order: Diptera
- Family: Calliphoridae
- Subfamily: Rhinophorinae
- Tribe: Rhinophorini
- Genus: Trypetidomima; Townsend, 1935

Type species
- Trypetidomima lutea Townsend, 1935

Genus of flies

Trypetidomima is a genus of flies in the family Calliphoridae.

== Species ==
- Trypetidomima fusca Nihei & Andrade, 2014
- Trypetidomima lutea Townsend, 1935

== Distribution ==
Brazil.
