= Acompomintho =

Scientific classification
- Kingdom: Animalia
- Phylum: Arthropoda
- Class: Insecta
- Order: Diptera
- Family: Calliphoridae
- Subfamily: Rhinophorinae
- Tribe: Rhinophorini
- Genus: Acompomintho; Villeneuve, 1927

Type species
- Acompomintho lobata Villeneuve, 1927

Synonyms
- Acampomintho Lopes, 1938; Acampomintho Townsend, 1931; Wagneriopsis Townsend, 1927

Genus of flies

Acompomintho is a genus of flies in the family Calliphoridae.

== Species ==
- Acompomintho caucasica (Villeneuve, 1908)
- Acompomintho itoshimensis Kato & Tachi, 2016
- Acompomintho lobata Villeneuve, 1927
- Acompomintho sinensis (Villeneuve, 1936)
