= Metoplisa =

Scientific classification
- Kingdom: Animalia
- Phylum: Arthropoda
- Class: Insecta
- Order: Diptera
- Family: Calliphoridae
- Subfamily: Rhinophorinae
- Tribe: Rhinophorini
- Genus: Metoplisa; Kugler, 1978

Type species
- Metoplisa carbonaria Kugler, 1978

Genus of flies

Metoplisa is a genus of flies in the family Calliphoridae.

== Species ==
- Metoplisa carbonaria Kugler, 1978

== Distribution ==
Israel.
