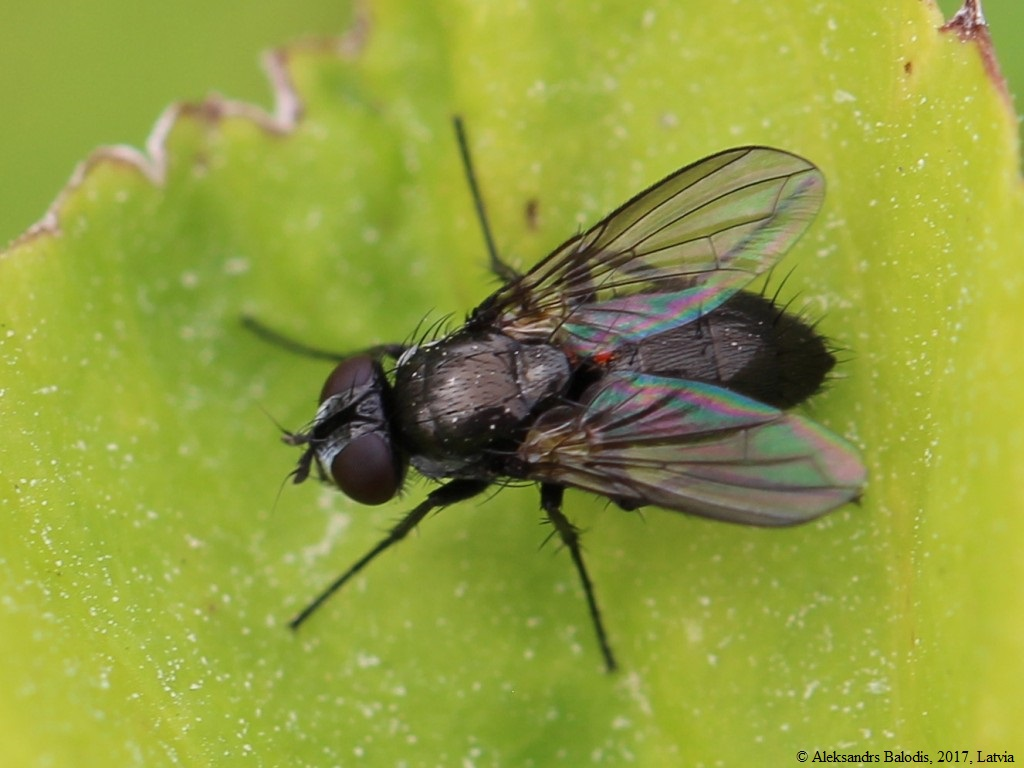
- Rhinophora lepida

Scientific classification
- Kingdom: Animalia
- Phylum: Arthropoda
- Class: Insecta
- Order: Diptera
- Family: Calliphoridae
- Subfamily: Rhinophorinae
- Tribe: Rhinophorini
- Genus: Rhinophora; Robineau-Desvoidy, 1830

Synonyms
- Rhynophoba Neave, 1940; Rhynophora Rondani, 1861

= Rhinophora =

Genus of flies

Rhinophora is a genus of flies in the family Calliphoridae.

== Species ==
- Rhinophora lepida (Meigen, 1824)

== Distribution ==
Belgium, Bulgaria, Cyprus, Czech Republic, Denmark, France, Germany, Hungary, Ireland, Italy, Netherlands, Poland, Russia, Slovakia, Spain, Sweden, Switzerland, Ukraine, United Kingdom.
