= Bezzimyia =

Scientific classification
- Kingdom: Animalia
- Phylum: Arthropoda
- Class: Insecta
- Order: Diptera
- Family: Calliphoridae
- Subfamily: Rhinophorinae
- Tribe: Rhinophorini
- Genus: Bezzimyia; Townsend, 1919

Type species
- Bezzimyia busckii Townsend, 1919

Synonyms
- Lutzomyia Curran, 1934; Pseudolutzomyia Rapp, 1945

Genus of flies

Bezzimyia is a genus of flies in the family Calliphoridae.

== Species ==
- Bezzimyia americana (Curran, 1934)
- Bezzimyia barbarista Pape & Arnaud, 2001
- Bezzimyia bisecta Pape & Arnaud, 2001
- Bezzimyia bulbosa Pape & Arnaud, 2001
- Bezzimyia busckii Townsend, 1919
- Bezzimyia floridensis Pape & Arnaud, 2001
- Bezzimyia hansoni Pape & Arnaud, 2001
- Bezzimyia jamaica Pape & Arnaud, 2001
- Bezzimyia lapidicina Pape & Arnaud, 2001
- Bezzimyia orestes Pape & Arnaud, 2001
- Bezzimyia pittieri Pape & Arnaud, 2001
- Bezzimyia platina Pape & Arnaud, 2001
- Bezzimyia ramicornis Pape & Arnaud, 2001
- Bezzimyia setifax Pape & Arnaud, 2001
- Bezzimyia sternothrix Pape & Arnaud, 2001
- Bezzimyia thompsonorum Pape & Arnaud, 2001
- Bezzimyia yepezi Pape & Arnaud, 2001
