= Rhinomorinia =

Scientific classification
- Kingdom: Animalia
- Phylum: Arthropoda
- Class: Insecta
- Order: Diptera
- Family: Calliphoridae
- Subfamily: Rhinophorinae
- Tribe: Rhinophorini
- Genus: Rhinomorinia; Brauer & von Berganstamm, 1889

Type species
- Morinia sarcophagina Schiner, 1861

Synonyms
- Dewetia Bischof, 1904; Pseudophania Brauer & von Berganstamm, 1893

Genus of flies

Rhinomorinia is a genus of flies in the family Calliphoridae.

== Species ==
- Rhinomorinia longifacies Herting, 1966
- Rhinomorinia sarcophagina (Schiner, 1861)
