= Neotarsina =

Scientific classification
- Kingdom: Animalia
- Phylum: Arthropoda
- Class: Insecta
- Order: Diptera
- Family: Calliphoridae
- Subfamily: Rhinophorinae
- Tribe: Rhinophorini
- Genus: Neotarsina; Cerretti & Pape, 2020

Type species
- Neotarsina caraibica Cerretti & Pape, 2020

Genus of flies

Neotarsina is a genus of flies in the family Calliphoridae.

== Species ==
- Neotarsina andina Cerretti & Pape, 2020
- Neotarsina caraibica Cerretti & Pape, 2020
