= Trachyzelotes lyonneti =

Scientific classification
- Domain: Eukaryota
- Kingdom: Animalia
- Phylum: Arthropoda
- Subphylum: Chelicerata
- Class: Arachnida
- Order: Araneae
- Infraorder: Araneomorphae
- Family: Gnaphosidae
- Genus: Trachyzelotes
- Species: T. lyonneti

Binomial name
- Trachyzelotes lyonneti (Audouin, 1826)

Species of spider

Trachyzelotes lyonneti is a species of ground spider in the family Gnaphosidae. It is found in Macaronesia, a range from Mediterranean to Central Asia, has been introduced into the United States, Mexico, Peru, and Brazil.
