= Tromodesia =

Scientific classification
- Kingdom: Animalia
- Phylum: Arthropoda
- Class: Insecta
- Order: Diptera
- Family: Calliphoridae
- Subfamily: Rhinophorinae
- Tribe: Rhinophorini
- Genus: Tromodesia; Rondani, 1856

Type species
- Tromodesia vibripennis Rondani, 1856

Synonyms
- Callidesia Kugler, 1978; Mimodexia Rohdendorf, 1935

Genus of flies

Tromodesia is a genus of flies in the family Calliphoridae.

== Species ==
- Tromodesia angustifrons Kugler, 1978
- Tromodesia guzari (Rohdendorf, 1935)
- Tromodesia intermedia (Rohdendorf, 1935)
- Tromodesia lindneriana (Rohdendorf, 1961)
- Tromodesia magnifica (Rohdendorf, 1935)
- Tromodesia obscurior (Rohdendorf, 1935)
- Tromodesia pallidissima (Rohdendorf, 1935)
- Tromodesia pictipennis (Kugler, 1978)
- Tromodesia setiventris (Rohdendorf, 1935)
- Tromodesia shachrudi (Rohdendorf, 1935)
- Tromodesia vibripennis Rondani, 1856
