= Bixinia =

Scientific classification
- Kingdom: Animalia
- Phylum: Arthropoda
- Class: Insecta
- Order: Diptera
- Family: Calliphoridae
- Subfamily: Rhinophorinae
- Tribe: Phytonini
- Genus: Bixinia; Cerretti, Lo Guidice & Pape, 2014

Type species
- Bixinia winkleri Cerretti, Lo Giudice & Pape, 2014

Genus of flies

Bixinia is a genus of flies in the family Calliphoridae.

== Species ==
- Bixinia collessi Cerretti, Lo Giudice & Pape, 2014
- Bixinia solitaria Cerretti, Lo Giudice & Pape, 2014
- Bixinia spei Cerretti, Lo Giudice & Pape, 2014
- Bixinia variabilis Cerretti, Lo Giudice & Pape, 2014
- Bixinia winkleri Cerretti, Lo Giudice & Pape, 2014
