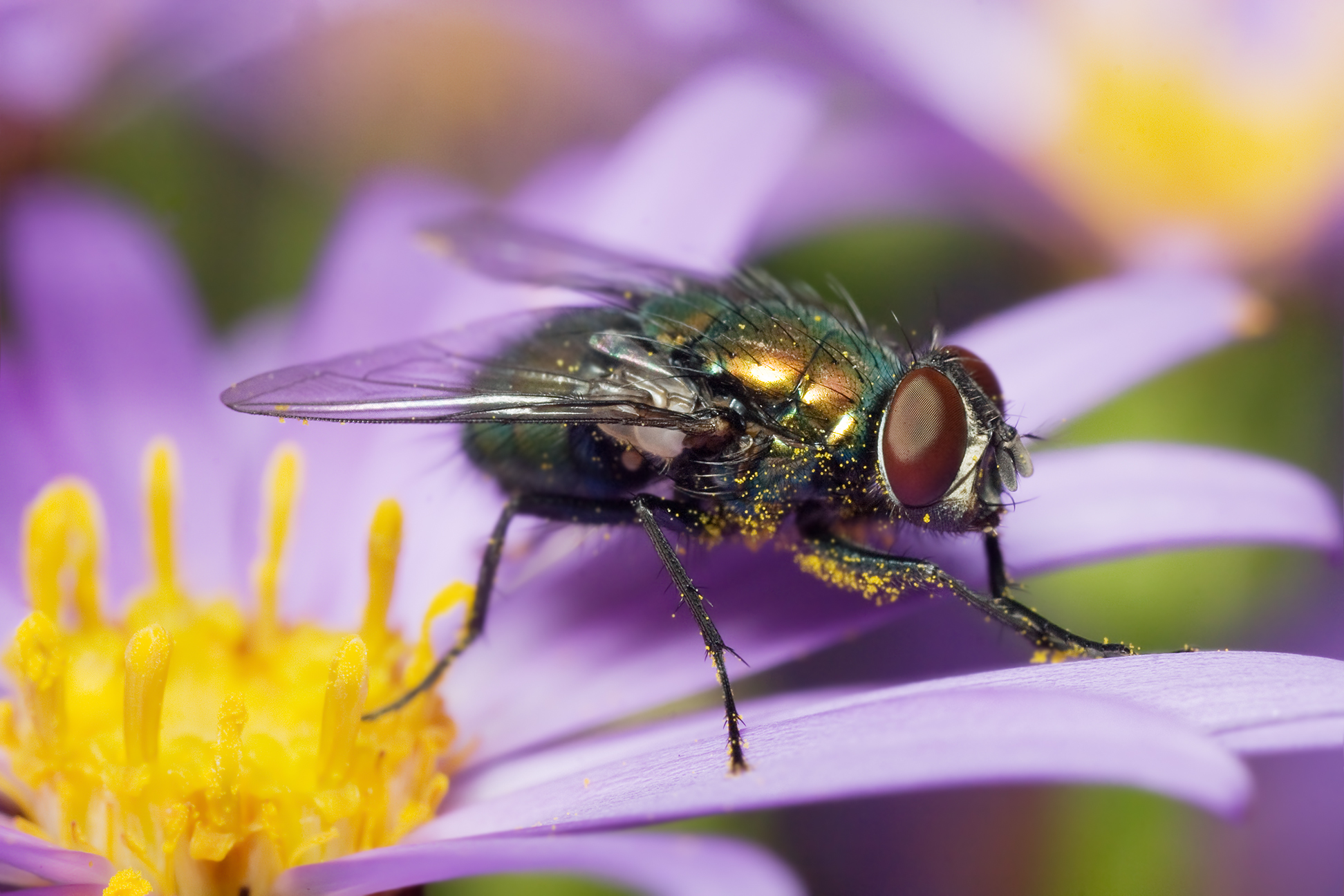

Scientific classification
- Kingdom: Animalia
- Phylum: Arthropoda
- Clade: Pancrustacea
- Class: Insecta
- Order: Diptera
- Family: Tachinidae
- Genus: Rutilia
- Subgenus: Chrysorutilia
- Species: R. formosa

Binomial name
- Rutilia formosa Robineau-Desvoidy, 1830

= Rutilia formosa =

Species of fly

Rutilia formosa is a species of fly in the family Tachinidae.

== Distribution ==
Australia.
