= Rutilia dorsomaculata =

Scientific classification
- Kingdom: Animalia
- Phylum: Arthropoda
- Clade: Pancrustacea
- Class: Insecta
- Order: Diptera
- Family: Tachinidae
- Genus: Rutilia
- Subgenus: Grapholostylum
- Species: R. dorsomaculata

Binomial name
- Rutilia dorsomaculata (Macquart, 1851)

Synonyms
- Formosia variegata Bigot, 1874

Species of fly

Rutilia dorsomaculata is a species of fly in the family Tachinidae.

== Distribution ==
Australia.
