= Doleschalla =

Scientific classification
- Kingdom: Animalia
- Phylum: Arthropoda
- Class: Insecta
- Order: Diptera
- Family: Tachinidae
- Subfamily: Dexiinae
- Tribe: Doleschallini
- Genus: Doleschalla; Walker, 1861

Type species
- Doleschalla cylindrica Walker, 1861

Synonyms
- Doleschallopsis Townsend, 1933; Macrosophia Townsend, 1933; Rhaphis Wulp, 1885

Genus of flies

Doleschalla is a genus of flies in the family Tachinidae.

== Species ==
- Doleschalla consobrina Bigot, 1888
- Doleschalla cylindrica Walker, 1861
- Doleschalla elongata (Wulp, 1885)
- Doleschalla maculifera Bigot, 1888
- Doleschalla makilingensis Townsend, 1928
- Doleschalla nigra Bigot, 1888
- Doleschalla papua (Townsend, 1933)
- Doleschalla parallela (Walker, 1861)
- Doleschalla picta Bigot, 1888
- Doleschalla solomonensis Baranov, 1934
- Doleschalla tenuis Malloch, 1932
