= Grapholostylum =

Scientific classification
- Kingdom: Animalia
- Phylum: Arthropoda
- Clade: Pancrustacea
- Class: Insecta
- Order: Diptera
- Family: Tachinidae
- Genus: Rutilia
- Subgenus: Grapholostylum; Macquart, 1851

Type species
- Grapholostylum dorso maculatum Macquart, 1851

Synonyms
- Graphalostylum Macquart, 1851; Agalmia Enderlein, 1936

Subgenus of flies

Grapholostylum is a subgenus of flies in the family Tachinidae.

== Species ==
- Rutilia albovirida Malloch, 1929
- Rutilia dorsomaculata (Macquart, 1851)
- Rutilia micans Malloch, 1929
- Rutilia subtustomentosa Macquart, 1851

== Distribution ==
Australia.
