= Aporeomyia =

Scientific classification
- Kingdom: Animalia
- Phylum: Arthropoda
- Class: Insecta
- Order: Diptera
- Family: Calliphoridae
- Subfamily: Rhinophorinae
- Tribe: Phytonini
- Genus: Aporeomyia; Pape & Shima, 1993

Type species
- Aporeomyia antennalis Pape & Shima, 1993

Genus of flies

Aporeomyia is a genus of flies in the family Calliphoridae. It was formally placed in the family Tachinidae.

== Species ==
- Aporeomyia antennalis Pape & Shima, 1993
- Aporeomyia elaphocera Gisondi, Pape, Shima & Cerretti, 2020
