= Macrotarsina =

Scientific classification
- Kingdom: Animalia
- Phylum: Arthropoda
- Class: Insecta
- Order: Diptera
- Family: Calliphoridae
- Subfamily: Rhinophorinae
- Tribe: Rhinophorini
- Genus: Macrotarsina; Schiner, 1857

Type species
- Macrotarsina zelleri Schiner, 1857

Synonyms
- Zelleria Egger, 1856

Genus of flies

Macrotarsina is a genus of flies in the family Calliphoridae.

== Species ==
- Macrotarsina longimanus (Egger, 1856)

== Distribution ==
Croatia, Cyprus, Gibraltar, Italy, Malta.
