= Rutilia minor =

Scientific classification
- Kingdom: Animalia
- Phylum: Arthropoda
- Clade: Pancrustacea
- Class: Insecta
- Order: Diptera
- Family: Tachinidae
- Genus: Rutilia
- Subgenus: Microrutilia
- Species: R. minor

Binomial name
- Rutilia minor Macquart, 1846

Species of fly

Rutilia minor is a species of fly in the family Tachinidae.

== Distribution ==
Australia.
