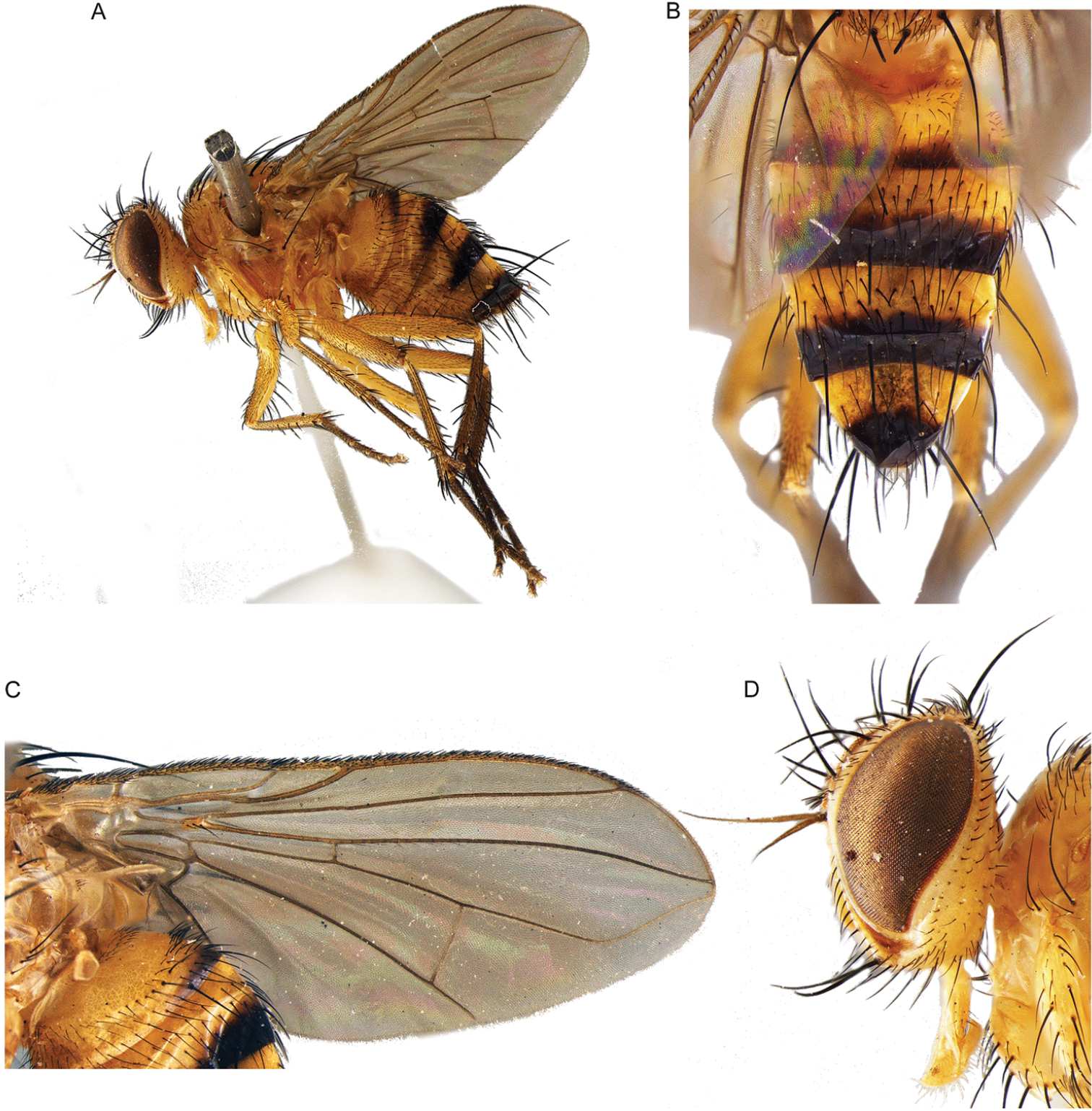
- Maurhinophora indoceanica

Scientific classification
- Kingdom: Animalia
- Phylum: Arthropoda
- Class: Insecta
- Order: Diptera
- Family: Calliphoridae
- Subfamily: Rhinophorinae
- Tribe: Rhinophorini
- Genus: Maurhinophora; Cerretti & Pape, 2020

Type species
- Maurhinophora indoceanica Cerretti & Pape, 2020

= Maurhinophora =

Genus of flies

Maurhinophora is a genus of flies in the family Calliphoridae.

== Species ==
- Maurhinophora indoceanica Cerretti & Pape, 2020

== Distribution ==
Mauritius
