= Neorutilia =

Scientific classification
- Kingdom: Animalia
- Phylum: Arthropoda
- Clade: Pancrustacea
- Class: Insecta
- Order: Diptera
- Family: Tachinidae
- Genus: Rutilia
- Subgenus: Neorutilia; Malloch, 1936

Type species
- Rutilia simplex Malloch, 1936

Subgenus of flies

Neorutilia is a subgenus of flies in the family Tachinidae. It is found in Australia.

== Species ==
- Rutilia simplex Malloch, 1874
