= Apomorphyto =

Scientific classification
- Kingdom: Animalia
- Phylum: Arthropoda
- Clade: Pancrustacea
- Class: Insecta
- Order: Diptera
- Family: Calliphoridae
- Subfamily: Rhinophorinae
- Tribe: Rhinophorini
- Genus: Apomorphyto; Cerretti, Lo Giudice & Pape, 2014

Type species
- Apomorphyto inbio Cerretti, Lo Giudice & Pape, 2014

Genus of flies

Apomorphyto is a genus of flies in the family Calliphoridae.

== Species ==
- Apomorphyto inbio Cerretti, Lo Giudice & Pape, 2014

== Distribution ==
Costa Rica, Nicaragua.
