= Rutilia regalis =

Scientific classification
- Kingdom: Animalia
- Phylum: Arthropoda
- Clade: Pancrustacea
- Class: Insecta
- Order: Diptera
- Family: Tachinidae
- Genus: Rutilia
- Subgenus: Donovanius
- Species: R. regalis

Binomial name
- Rutilia regalis Guerin, 1831

Species of fly

Rutilia regalis is a species of fly in the family Tachinidae.

== Distribution ==
Australia.
