= Baniassa =

Scientific classification
- Kingdom: Animalia
- Phylum: Arthropoda
- Clade: Pancrustacea
- Class: Insecta
- Order: Diptera
- Family: Calliphoridae
- Subfamily: Rhinophorinae
- Tribe: Phytonini
- Genus: Baniassa; Kugler, 1978

Type species
- Baniassa fascipennis Kugler, 1978

Genus of flies

Baniassa is a genus of flies in the family Calliphoridae.

== Species ==
- Baniassa fascipennis Kugler, 1978
- Baniassa fenestrata Zeegers, 2008
- Baniassa paucipila Pape, 1985
- Baniassa pennata Gisondi, Pape, Shima & Cerretti, 2020
