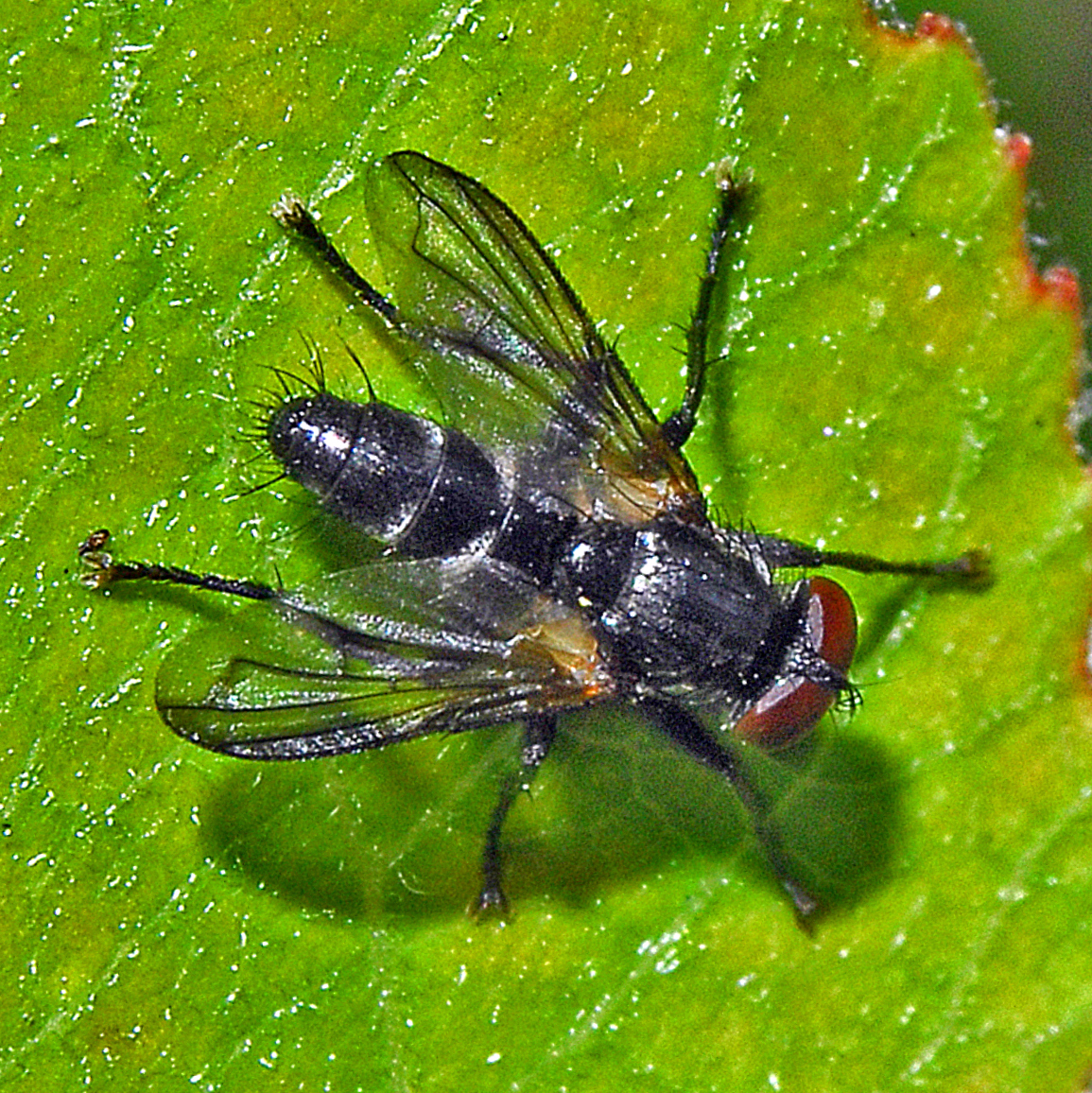
- Stevenia species

Scientific classification
- Kingdom: Animalia
- Phylum: Arthropoda
- Class: Insecta
- Order: Diptera
- Family: Calliphoridae
- Subfamily: Rhinophorinae
- Tribe: Rhinophorini
- Genus: Stevenia; Robineau-Desvoidy, 1830

Type species
- Stevenia tomentosa Robineau-Desvoidy, 1830

Synonyms
- Astevenia Belanovsky, 1951; Eophyto Townsend, 1919; Ptiloceroides Villeneuve, 1924; Ptilochaeta Bezzi & Stein, 1907; Sterenia Lioy, 1864; Trisonevra Lioy, 1864

= Stevenia (fly) =

Genus of flies

Stevenia is a genus of flies in the family Calliphoridae.

== Species ==
- Stevenia actenata Zeegers, 2008
- Stevenia acutangula (Villeneuve, 1910)
- Stevenia angustifrons Villeneuve, 1912
- Stevenia atramentaria (Meigen, 1824)
- Stevenia bertei (Rondani, 1865)
- Stevenia ceylanica (Townsend, 1919)
- Stevenia deceptoria (Loew, 1847)
- Stevenia etrusca Cerretti & Pape, 2007
- Stevenia fausti (Portschinsky, 1875)
- Stevenia fernandezi Báez, 1979
- Stevenia flaviventris Kugler, 1978
- Stevenia gilasiani Ziegler, Gisondi & Cerretti, 2019
- Stevenia hertingi Kugler, 1978
- Stevenia hirtigena Herting, 1961
- Stevenia kugleri Herting, 1961
- Stevenia nudiseta Belanovsky, 1951
- Stevenia obscuripennis (Loew, 1847)
- Stevenia palermitana Cerretti & Pape, 2007
- Stevenia pannonica Villeneuve, 1919
- Stevenia sardoa Villeneuve, 1920
- Stevenia signata (Mik, 1866)
- Stevenia socotrensis Crosskey, 1977
- Stevenia subalbida (Villeneuve, 1911)
- Stevenia triangulata (Loew, 1847)
- Stevenia umbratica (Fallén, 1820)
