= Kinabalumyia =

Scientific classification
- Kingdom: Animalia
- Phylum: Arthropoda
- Class: Insecta
- Order: Diptera
- Family: Calliphoridae
- Subfamily: Rhinophorinae
- Tribe: Phytonini
- Genus: Kinabalumyia; Cerretti & Pape, 2020

Type species
- Kinabalumyia pinax Cerretti & Pape, 2020

Genus of flies

Kinabalumyia is a genus of flies in the family Calliphoridae.

== Species ==
- Kinabalumyia pinax Cerretti & Pape, 2020

== Distribution ==
Sabah.
