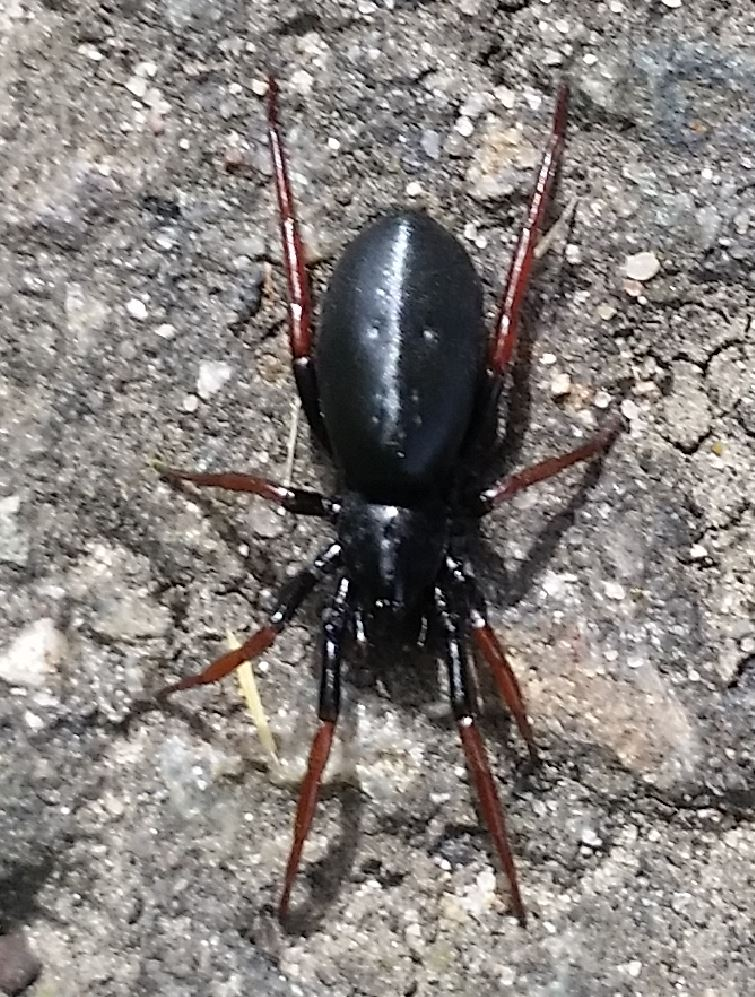

Scientific classification
- Kingdom: Animalia
- Phylum: Arthropoda
- Subphylum: Chelicerata
- Class: Arachnida
- Order: Araneae
- Infraorder: Araneomorphae
- Family: Gnaphosidae
- Genus: Trachyzelotes
- Species: T. pedestris

Binomial name
- Trachyzelotes pedestris (C. L. Koch, 1837)

= Trachyzelotes pedestris =

European ground spider

Trachyzelotes pedestris, The yellow-legged zipper spider, is a species of Trachyzelotes ground spider first described by C.L.Koch in 1837.

== Description ==
Embolus pointing in longitudinal direction of palpal. Epigyne with distinct median plate. Prosoma dark rust brown to brown-black. Chelicerae frontally densely provided with spines. Legs light yellow to orange. Femur darker. Opisthosoma male: with dark brown scuticula.

Body length male: 4.5-6 mm Body length female: 6.6-9.4 mm

== Range ==
In Britain, this species is confined to southern Britain south of a line from Norfolk to Herefordshire. It is widespread in western and central Europe as far north as Sweden, and as far South as Czech Republic.

Trachyzelotes pedestris can be found in the following European countries: Austria, Belgium, Britain, Bulgaria, Croatia, Czech Republic, Denmark, Estonia, France, Germany, Greece, Hungary, Italy, Latvia, Liechtenstein, Macedonia, the Netherlands, Poland, Portugal, Romania, Sicily, Slovakia, Slovenia, Spain, Sweden, Switzerland and Ukraine.

== Habitat and distribution ==
Trachyzelotes pedestris usually occurs in chalk and limestone grassland, often under stones in fairly open habitat. In Essex it occurs on dry south-facing grasslands, landslip areas and at the base of sea walls. It has occasionally been found in open sandy areas on Breckland heaths. P. Merrett notes an occurrence in his kitchen sink! (limestone grassland nearby). Egg-sacs are deposited under stones. Adults of both sexes have been recorded between May and August, mainly in June.
