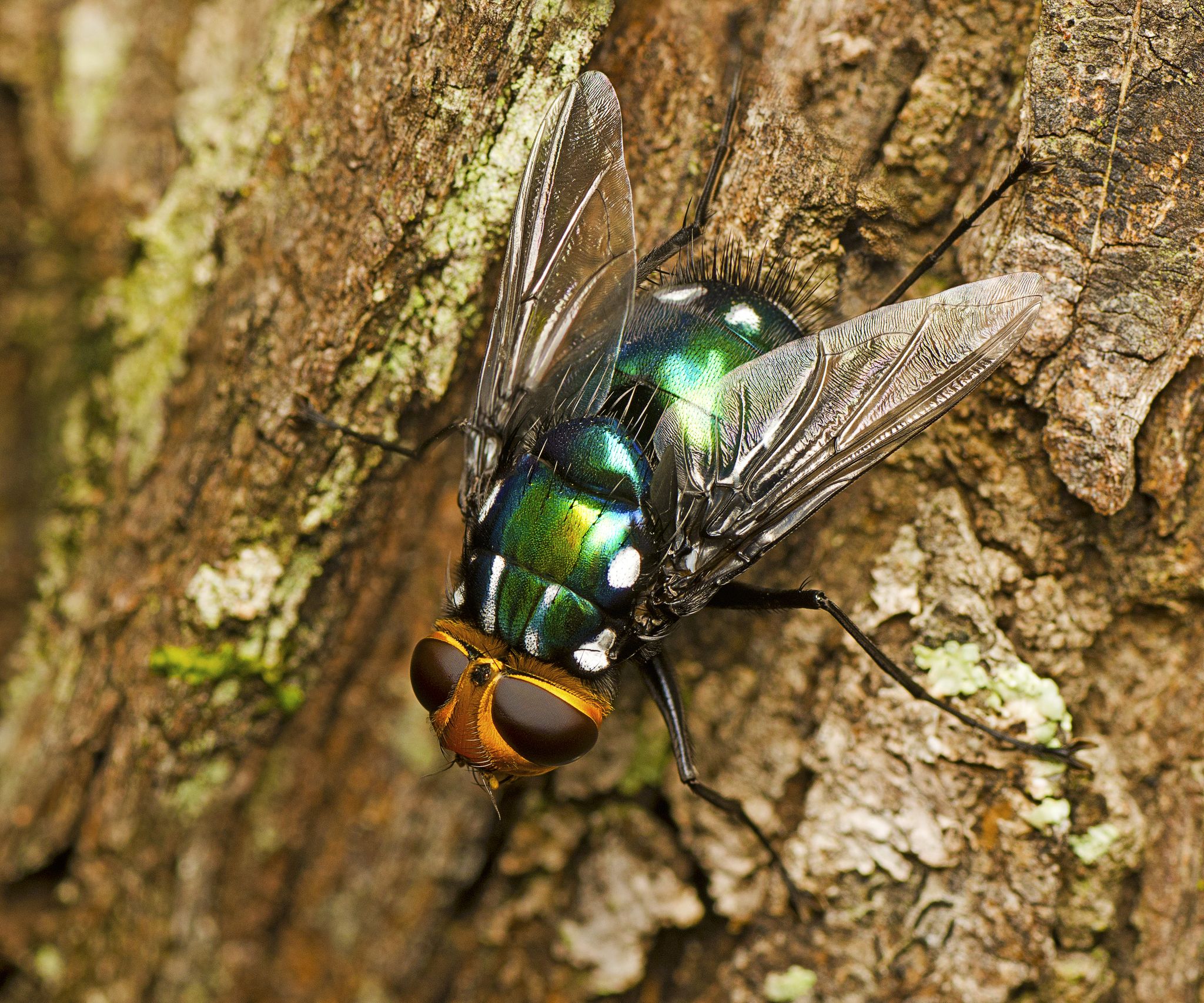

Scientific classification
- Kingdom: Animalia
- Phylum: Arthropoda
- Clade: Pancrustacea
- Class: Insecta
- Order: Diptera
- Family: Tachinidae
- Genus: Rutilia
- Subgenus: Ameniamima
- Species: R. argentifera

Binomial name
- Rutilia argentifera Bigot, 1874

= Rutilia argentifera =

Species of fly

Rutilia argentifera is a species of fly in the family Tachinidae.

== Distribution ==
Australia.
