= Marinarozelotes bardiae =

Scientific classification
- Kingdom: Animalia
- Phylum: Arthropoda
- Subphylum: Chelicerata
- Class: Arachnida
- Order: Araneae
- Infraorder: Araneomorphae
- Family: Gnaphosidae
- Genus: Marinarozelotes
- Species: M. bardiae

Binomial name
- Marinarozelotes bardiae (Caporiacco, 1928)

Species of spider

Marinarozelotes bardiae is a species of arachnid in the infraorder Araneomorphae, family Gnaphosidae, and genus Marinarozelotes. It was described by Caporiacco in 1928.

It is distributed in the Mediterranean. The male's body measures approximately 4.9–7.7 millimeters in length, and the female's measures 5.9–10.0 millimeters.
