= Shannoniella =

Scientific classification
- Kingdom: Animalia
- Phylum: Arthropoda
- Class: Insecta
- Order: Diptera
- Family: Calliphoridae
- Subfamily: Rhinophorinae
- Tribe: Rhinophorini
- Genus: Shannoniella; Townsend, 1939

Type species
- Shannoniella cuspidata Townsend, 1939

Genus of flies

Shannoniella is a genus of flies in the family Calliphoridae.

== Species ==
- Shannoniella cuspidata Townsend, 1939
- Shannoniella setinervis Nihei, Andrade, Pape & Cerretti, 2016
