= Rhinopeza =

Scientific classification
- Kingdom: Animalia
- Phylum: Arthropoda
- Class: Insecta
- Order: Diptera
- Family: Calliphoridae
- Subfamily: Rhinophorinae
- Tribe: Phytonini
- Genus: Rhinopeza; Cerretti, Lo Guidice & Pape, 2014

Type species
- Rhinopeza gracilis Cerretti, Lo Guidice & Pape, 2014

Genus of flies

Rhinopeza is a genus of flies in the family Calliphoridae.

== Species ==
- Rhinopeza gracilis Cerretti, Lo Giudice & Pape, 2014

== Distribution ==
Papua New Guinea.
