= Axinia =

Scientific classification
- Kingdom: Animalia
- Phylum: Arthropoda
- Class: Insecta
- Order: Diptera
- Family: Calliphoridae
- Subfamily: Rhinophorinae
- Tribe: Phytonini
- Genus: Axinia; Colless, 1994

Type species
- Axinia arenaria Colless, 1994

Synonyms
- Barrinea Colless, 1994; Chirops Colless, 1994; Ismaya Colless, 1994; Johnismaya Colless, 1994

Genus of flies

Axinia is a genus of flies in the family Calliphoridae.

== Species ==
- Axinia arcana (Colless, 1994)
- Axinia arenaria Colless, 1994
- Axinia austrina Colless, 1994
- Axinia bicolor Colless, 1994
- Axinia brevicentrum Colless, 1994
- Axinia cantrelli Colless, 1994
- Axinia carnei Colless, 1994
- Axinia cornuta Colless, 1994
- Axinia disjuncta (Colless, 1994)
- Axinia gressitti Colless, 1994
- Axinia lucaris Colless, 1994
- Axinia minuta Colless, 1994
- Axinia miranda (Colless, 1994)
- Axinia mutabilis Colless, 1994
- Axinia naumanni Colless, 1994
- Axinia zentae Colless, 1994
