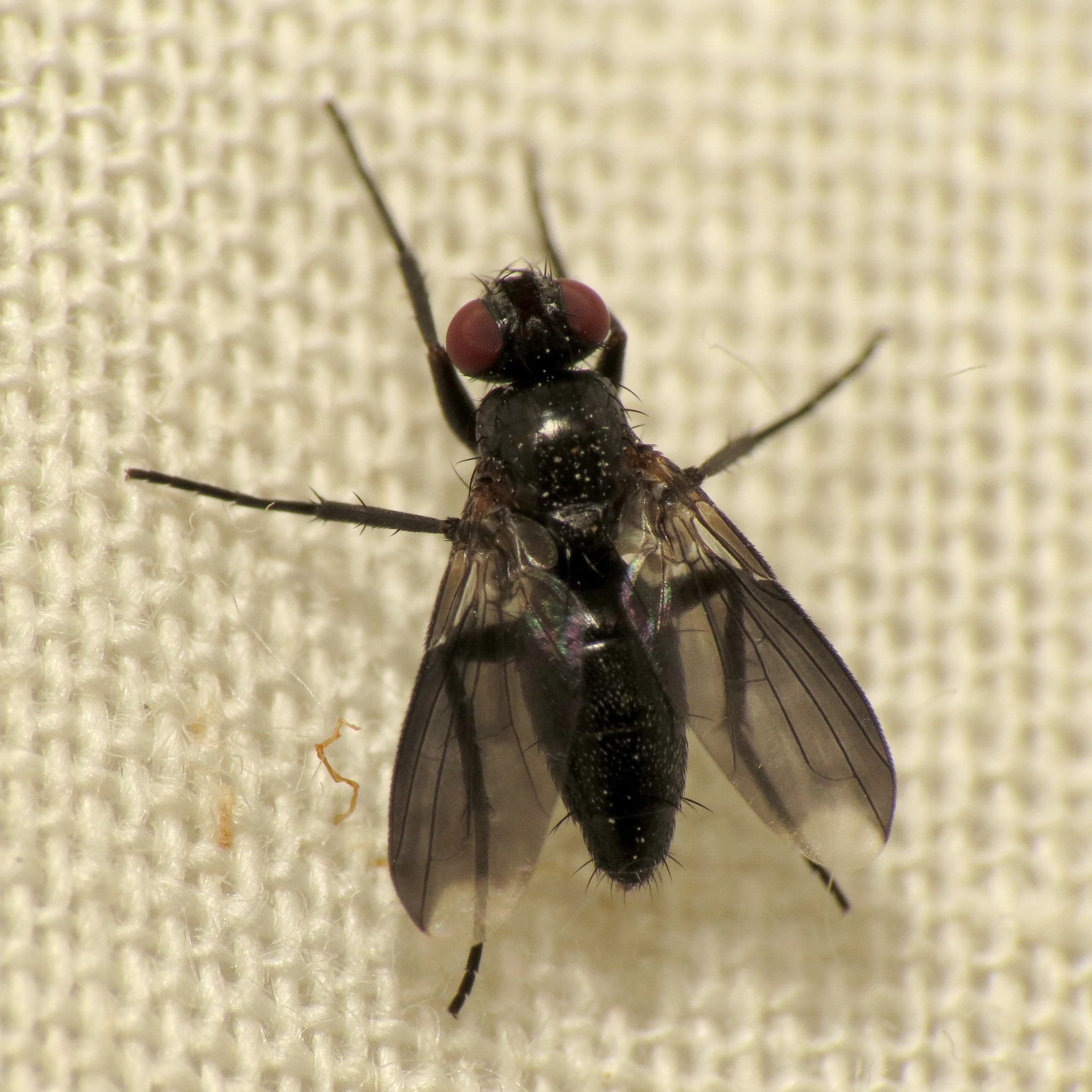
- Melanophora roralis

Scientific classification
- Kingdom: Animalia
- Phylum: Arthropoda
- Class: Insecta
- Order: Diptera
- Family: Calliphoridae
- Subfamily: Rhinophorinae
- Tribe: Phytonini

= Phytonini =

Family of flies

Phytonini is a tribe of flies (Diptera), known as woodlouse flies

== Genera ==
- Aporeomyia Pape & Shima, 1993
- Axinia Colless, 1994
- Baniassa Kugler, 1978
- Bixinia Cerretti, Lo Giudice & Pape, 2014
- Comoromyia Crosskey, 1977
- Kinabalumyia Cerretti & Pape, 2020
- Malayia Malloch, 1926
- Melanophora Meigen, 1803
- Parazamimus Verbeke, 1962
- Paykullia Robineau-Desvoidy, 1830
- Phyto Robineau-Desvoidy, 1830
- Rhinodonia Cerretti, Lo Giudice & Pape, 2014
- Rhinopeza Cerretti, Lo Giudice & Pape, 2014
