= Parazamimus =

Scientific classification
- Kingdom: Animalia
- Phylum: Arthropoda
- Class: Insecta
- Order: Diptera
- Family: Calliphoridae
- Subfamily: Rhinophorinae
- Tribe: Phytonini
- Genus: Parazamimus; Verbeke, 1962

Type species
- Parazamimus congolensis Verbeke, 1962

Genus of flies

Parazamimus is a genus of flies in the family Calliphoridae.

== Species ==
- Parazamimus congolensis Verbeke, 1962

== Distribution ==
Burundi, Congo.
