= Microrutilia =

Scientific classification
- Kingdom: Animalia
- Phylum: Arthropoda
- Clade: Pancrustacea
- Class: Insecta
- Order: Diptera
- Family: Tachinidae
- Genus: Rutilia
- Subgenus: Microrutilia; Townsend, 1915

Type species
- Rutilia minor Macquart, 1846

Synonyms
- Prosenostoma Townsend, 1932; Eucompsa Enderlein, 1936; Pogonagalmia Enderlein, 1936

Subgenus of flies

Microrutilia is a subgenus of flies in the family Tachinidae.

== Species ==
- Rutilia cupreiventris Malloch, 1936
- Rutilia fulviventris Bigot, 1874
- Rutilia hirticeps Malloch, 1929
- Rutilia liris (Walker, 1849)
- Rutilia media Macquart, 1846
- Rutilia minor Macquart, 1846
- Rutilia nigriceps Malloch, 1929
- Rutilia nigripes (Enderlein, 1936)

== Distribution ==
Australia.
