= Oplisa =

Scientific classification
- Kingdom: Animalia
- Phylum: Arthropoda
- Class: Insecta
- Order: Diptera
- Family: Calliphoridae
- Subfamily: Rhinophorinae
- Tribe: Rhinophorini
- Genus: Oplisa; Rondani, 1862

Type species
- Oplisa medica Rondani, 1862

Synonyms
- Anoplisa Herting, 1961; Hoplisa Bezzi, 1907; Hoplisa Brauer & von Berganstamm, 1889; Melanomelia Strobl, 1899

Genus of flies

Oplisa is a genus of flies in the family Calliphoridae.

== Species ==
- Oplisa aterrima (Strobl, 1899)
- Oplisa caesia (Villeneuve, 1911)
- Oplisa grandiloba Kugler, 1978
- Oplisa hertingi Zeegers, 2011
- Oplisa japonica Pape & Kurahashi, 1994
- Oplisa nudiseta Zeegers, 2011
- Oplisa oldenbergi (Herting, 1961)
- Oplisa pollinosa Kugler, 1978
- Oplisa tergestina (Schiner, 1861)
