= Malayia =

Scientific classification
- Kingdom: Animalia
- Phylum: Arthropoda
- Class: Insecta
- Order: Diptera
- Family: Calliphoridae
- Subfamily: Rhinophorinae
- Tribe: Phytonini
- Genus: Malayia; Malloch, 1926

Type species
- Malayia fuscinervis Malloch, 1926

Genus of flies

Malayia is a genus of flies in the family Calliphoridae.

== Species ==
- Malayia fuscinervis Malloch, 1926
- Malayia indica Lo Giudice, Pape & Cerretti, 2016
- Malayia nigripennis Malloch, 1927
