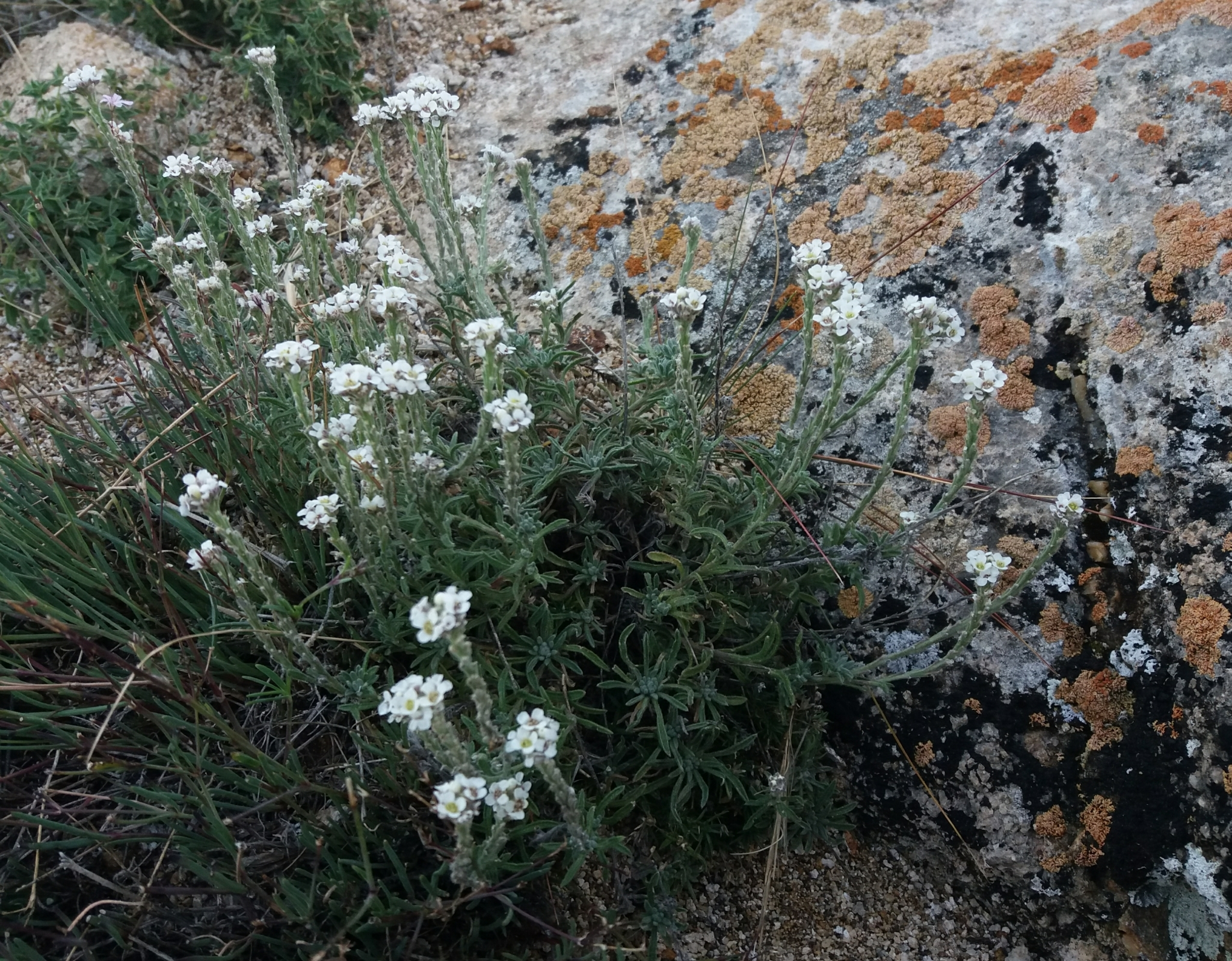
- Stevenia tenuifolia

Scientific classification
- Kingdom: Plantae
- Clade: Tracheophytes
- Clade: Angiosperms
- Clade: Eudicots
- Clade: Rosids
- Order: Brassicales
- Family: Brassicaceae
- Tribe: Stevenieae
- Genus: Stevenia; Adams & Fisch.

Synonyms
- Berteroella O.E.Schulz

= Stevenia (plant) =

Genus of flowering plants

Stevenia is a genus of flowering plants in the family Brassicaceae. It includes seven species native to temperate Asia, ranging from Kazakhstan and western Siberia to southeastern China, Japan, and the Russian Far East.

== Species ==
Seven species are accepted.

- Stevenia alyssoides Adams & Fisch.
- Stevenia cheiranthoides DC.
- Stevenia dahurica (Peschkova) D.A.German & Al-Shehbaz
- Stevenia incarnata Kamelin
- Stevenia maximowiczii (Palib.) D.A.German & Al-Shehbaz
- Stevenia sergievskajae (Krasnob.) Kamelin & Gubanov
- Stevenia tenuifolia (Stephan ex Willd.) D.A.German
