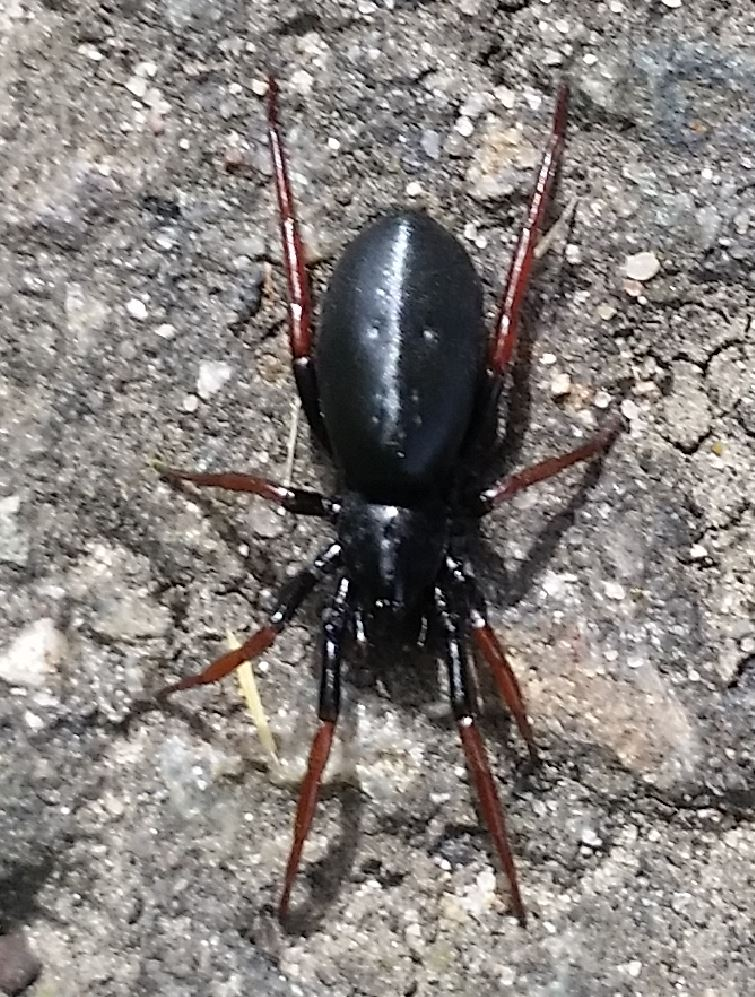
- T. pedestris

Scientific classification
- Kingdom: Animalia
- Phylum: Arthropoda
- Subphylum: Chelicerata
- Class: Arachnida
- Order: Araneae
- Infraorder: Araneomorphae
- Family: Gnaphosidae
- Genus: Trachyzelotes; Lohmander, 1944

Type species
- T. pedestris (C. L. Koch, 1837)

Species
- 22, see text

Synonyms
- Simonizelotes Marinaro, 1967

= Trachyzelotes =

Genus of spiders

Trachyzelotes is a genus of ground spiders that was first described by H. Lohmander in 1944 as a subgenus of Zelotes, and was raised to genus status in 1967. It has a body length of 3 to 13 millimetres (0.12 to 0.51 in).

== Species ==
As of May 2019 it contains twenty-two species:

- Trachyzelotes adriaticus (Caporiacco, 1951) – Italy to China
- Trachyzelotes ansimensis Seo, 2002 – Korea
- Trachyzelotes baiyuensis Xu, 1991 – China
- Trachyzelotes barbatus (L. Koch, 1866) – Mediterranean to Caucasus. Introduced to US.
- Trachyzelotes bardiae (Caporiacco, 1928) – Mediterranean
- Trachyzelotes chybyndensis Tuneva & Esyunin, 2002 – Russia (Europe), Kazakhstan
- Trachyzelotes cumensis (Ponomarev, 1979) – Ukraine, Russia (Europe), Azerbaijan, Kazakhstan
- Trachyzelotes fuscipes (L. Koch, 1866) – Mediterranean, Kazakhstan, China
- Trachyzelotes glossus (Strand, 1915) – Turkey, Israel
- Trachyzelotes holosericeus (Simon, 1878) – Mediterranean
- Trachyzelotes huberti Platnick & Murphy, 1984 – Algeria, Italy, Albania
- Trachyzelotes jaxartensis (Kroneberg, 1875) – Northern Africa to Caucasus, Russia (Europe) to Central Asia, Iran. Introduced to Hawaii, US, Mexico, South Africa, India, China
- Trachyzelotes kulczynskii (Bösenberg, 1902) – Macedonia, Bulgaria. Introduced to US, Caribbean, Colombia, Brazil, Japan, Samoa
- Trachyzelotes lyonneti (Audouin, 1826) – Macaronesia, Mediterranean to Central Asia. Introduced to US, Mexico, Peru, Brazil
- Trachyzelotes malkini Platnick & Murphy, 1984 – Romania, Albania, Macedonia, Bulgaria, Greece, Ukraine, Russia (Europe, Caucasus), Turkey, Iran, Kazakhstan
- Trachyzelotes manytchensis Ponomarev & Tsvetkov, 2006 – Russia (Europe), Iran
- Trachyzelotes miniglossus Levy, 2009 – Israel, Iran
- Trachyzelotes minutus Crespo, 2010 – Portugal
- Trachyzelotes mutabilis (Simon, 1878) – Mediterranean, Romania
- Trachyzelotes pedestris (C. L. Koch, 1837) (type) – Europe, Caucasus, Turkey, Iran
- Trachyzelotes ravidus (L. Koch, 1875) – Ethiopia
- Trachyzelotes stubbsi Platnick & Murphy, 1984 – Greece, Cyprus
