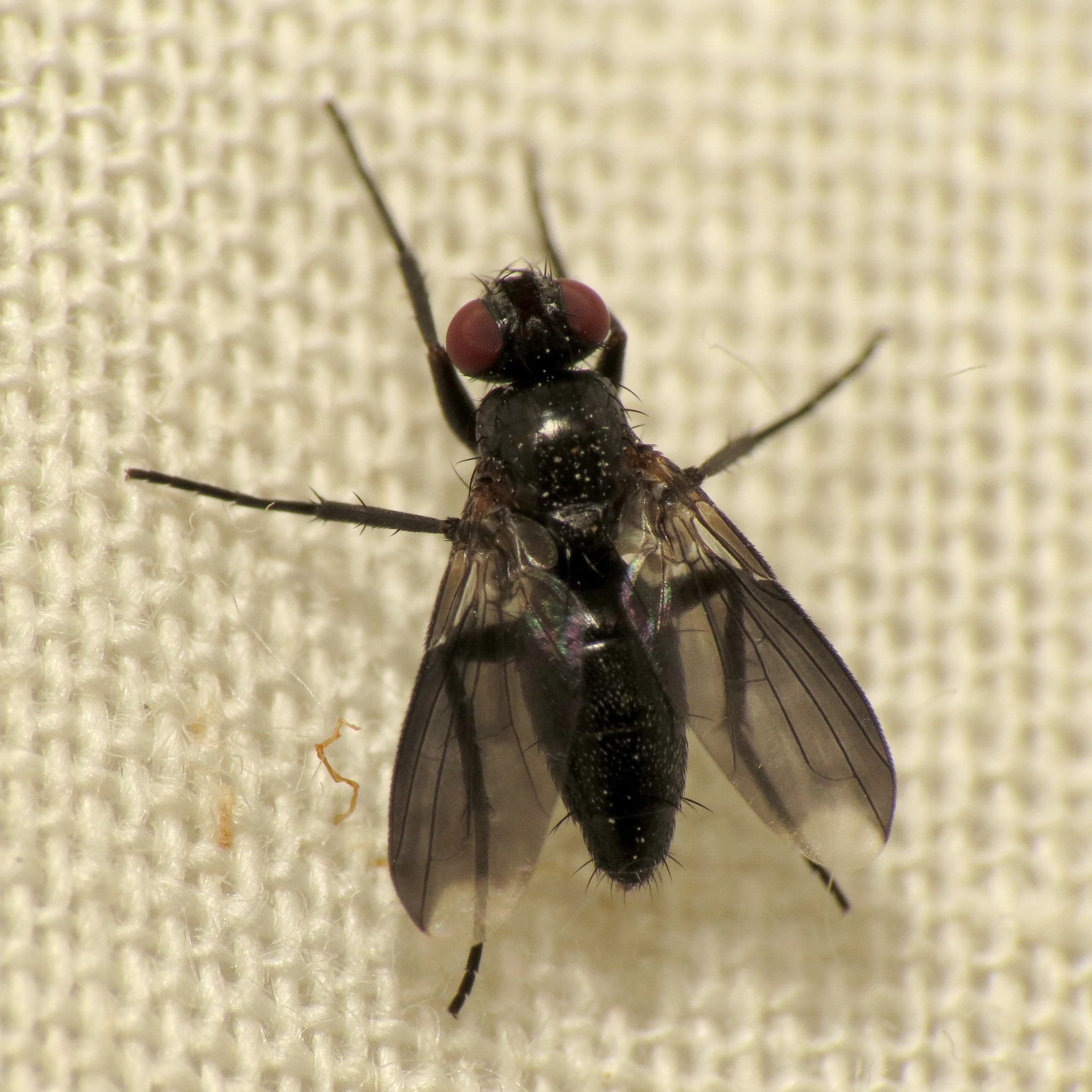
- Melanophora roralis

Scientific classification
- Kingdom: Animalia
- Phylum: Arthropoda
- Class: Insecta
- Order: Diptera
- Family: Calliphoridae
- Subfamily: Rhinophorinae
- Tribe: Phytonini
- Genus: Melanophora; Meigen, 1803

Type species
- Musca grossificationis (Linnaeus, 1758)

Synonyms
- Bequaertiana Curran, 1929; Illigeria Robineau-Desvoidy, 1830; Melanophera Fischer, 1813; Melanosphora Shimer, 1871; Milanophora Fabricius, 1805

= Melanophora =

Genus of flies

Melanophora is a genus of woodlouse flies in the family Calliphoridae.

== Species ==
- Melanophora argyriventris (Curran, 1929)
- Melanophora asetosa Kugler, 1978
- Melanophora basilewskyi (Peris, 1957)
- Melanophora chia Cerretti & Pape, 2009
- Melanophora roralis (Linnaeus, 1758)
