= Doleschallini =

Scientific classification
- Kingdom: Animalia
- Phylum: Arthropoda
- Class: Insecta
- Order: Diptera
- Family: Tachinidae
- Subfamily: Dexiinae
- Tribe: Doleschallini; Mesnil & Shima, 1979

Tribe of flies

Doleschallini is a tribe of flies in the family Tachinidae.

== Genera ==
- Doleschalla Walker, 1861
- Torocca Walker, 1859
