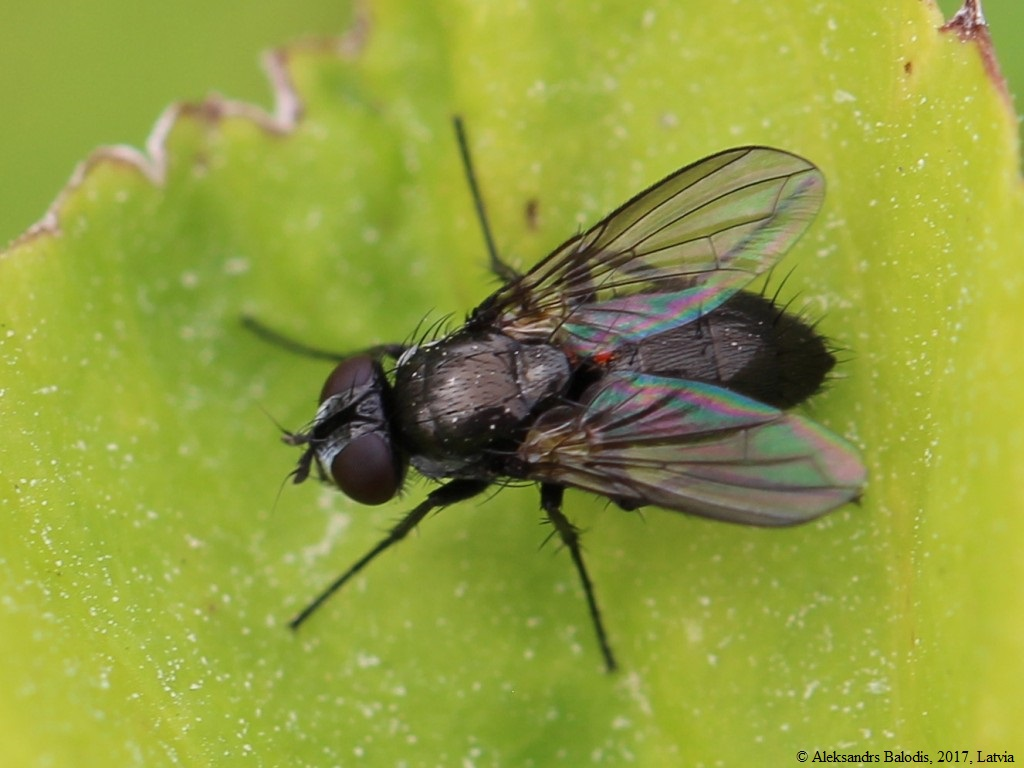
- Rhinophora lepida

Scientific classification
- Domain: Eukaryota
- Kingdom: Animalia
- Phylum: Arthropoda
- Class: Insecta
- Order: Diptera
- Family: Calliphoridae
- Subfamily: Rhinophorinae
- Tribe: Rhinophorini

= Rhinophorini =

Family of flies

Rhinophorini is a tribe of flies (Diptera), known as woodlouse flies

== Genera ==
- Acompomintho Villeneuve, 1927
- Apomorphyto Cerretti, Lo Giudice & Pape, 2014
- Azaisia Villeneuve, 1939
- Bezzimyia Townsend, 1919
- Macrotarsina Schiner, 1857
- Maurhinophora Cerretti & Pape, 2020
- Melanomyoides Crosskey, 1977
- Marshallicona Cerretti & Pape, 2020
- Metoplisa Kugler, 1978
- Neotarsina Cerretti & Pape, 2020
- Oplisa Rondani, 1862
- Oxytachina Brauer & von Berganstamm, 1891
- Queximyia Crosskey, 1977
- Rhinomorinia Brauer & von Bergenstamm, 1889
- Rhinophora Robineau-Desvoidy, 1830
- Shannoniella Townsend, 1939
- Stevenia Robineau-Desvoidy, 1830
- Tricogena Rondani, 1856
- Tromodesia Rondani, 1856
- Trypetidomima Townsend, 1935
- Ventrops Crosskey, 1977
