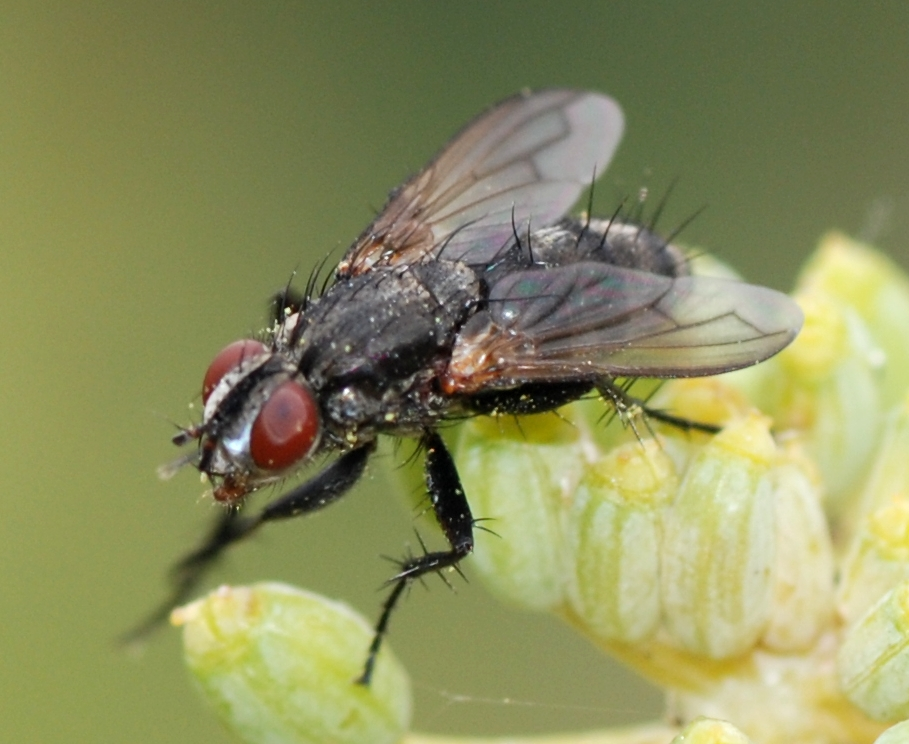
- Stevenia sp.

Scientific classification
- Kingdom: Animalia
- Phylum: Arthropoda
- Clade: Pancrustacea
- Class: Insecta
- Order: Diptera
- Clade: Cyclorrhapha
- Section: Schizophora
- Subsection: Calyptratae
- Superfamily: Oestroidea
- Family: Calliphoridae
- Subfamily: Rhinophorinae; Robineau-Desvoidy, 1863

Tribes
- Rhinophorini; Phytonini

Synonyms
- Axiniidae Colless, 1994

= Rhinophorinae =

Family of flies

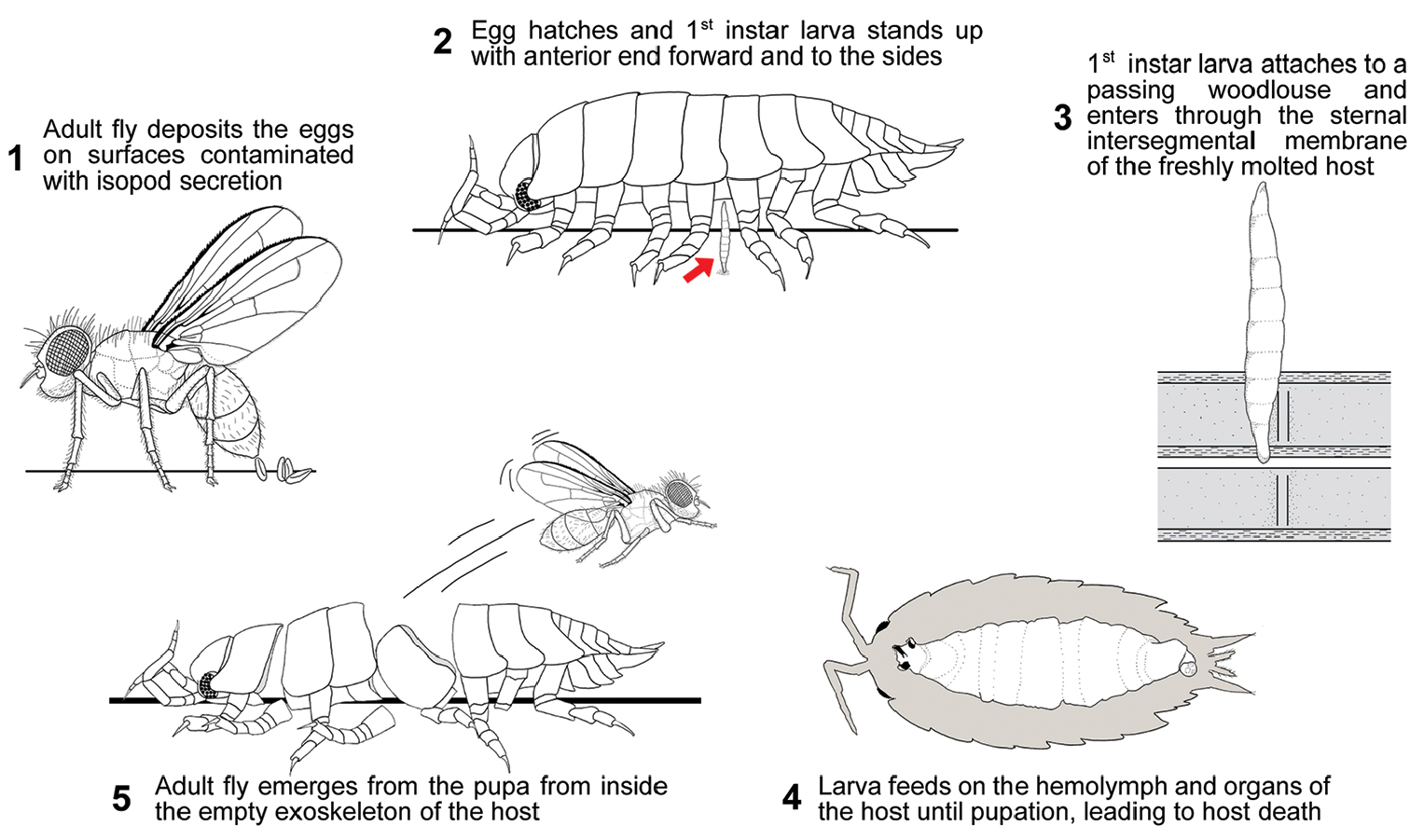
Schematic representation of the infection cycle of a Rhinophoridae fly in a woodlouse host.

Rhinophora lepida on Cardamine pratensis (video, 1m 50s)

Rhinophorinae is a subfamily of flies (Diptera), commonly known as Woodlouse Flies, found in all zoogeographic regions except Oceania, but mainly in the Palaearctic and Afrotropical regions.

They are small, slender, black, bristly flies phylogenetically close to the Tachinidae, formally many authors considered them a family, they are now a subfamily in the Calliphoridae. The larvae are mostly parasitoids of woodlice, beetles, spiders, and other arthropods, and occasionally snails.

By 2020, about 33 genera were placed in the family, with a total 177 species.

== Genera ==
- Acompomintho Villeneuve, 1927
- Apomorphyto Cerretti, Lo Giudice & Pape, 2014
- Aporeomyia Pape & Shima, 1993
- Axinia Colless, 1994
- Azaisia Villeneuve, 1939
- Baniassa Kugler, 1978
- Bezzimyia Townsend, 1919
- Bixinia Cerretti, Lo Giudice & Pape, 2014
- Comoromyia Crosskey, 1977
- Kinabalumyia Cerretti & Pape, 2020
- Macrotarsina Schiner, 1857
- Malayia Malloch, 1926
- Marshallicona Cerretti & Pape, 2020
- Maurhinophora Cerretti & Pape, 2020
- Melanomyoides Crosskey, 1977
- Melanophora Meigen, 1803
- Metoplisa Kugler, 1978
- Neotarsina Cerretti & Pape, 2020
- Oplisa Rondani, 1862
- Oxytachina Brauer & von Berganstamm, 1891
- Parazamimus Verbeke, 1962
- Paykullia Robineau-Desvoidy, 1830
- Phyto Robineau-Desvoidy, 1830
- Queximyia Crosskey, 1977
- Rhinodonia Cerretti, Lo Giudice & Pape, 2014
- Rhinomorinia Brauer & von Bergenstamm, 1889
- Rhinopeza Cerretti, Lo Giudice & Pape, 2014
- Rhinophora Robineau-Desvoidy, 1830
- Shannoniella Townsend, 1939
- Stevenia Robineau-Desvoidy, 1830
- Tricogena Rondani, 1856
- Tromodesia Rondani, 1856
- Trypetidomima Townsend, 1935
- Ventrops Crosskey, 1977
