= Roger Ward Crosskey =

British entomologist (1930–2017)

Roger Ward Crosskey (29 January 1930 - 4 September 2017) was a British entomologist who worked at the Commonwealth Institute of Entomology and at the Natural History Museum in London specializing in blackflies (Simuliidae), Tachinidae and the hymenopteran superfamily Evanioidea.

Roger Crosskey was born in Croydon to Harold and Elfreda née Ward. His mother died of cancer when he was sixteen and after that spent a lot of his time outdoors collecting insects including butterflies and diving beetles. He studied at Whitgift School and his first publication was in 1951. He studied ensign wasps (Aulacidae and Gasteruptiidae) for his master's degree from the University of London. He married Margaret Eileen ("Peggy") née Godfrey with whom he studied at college. Peggy was also an entomologist and worked alongside him throughout his career. Crosskey joined as an entomologist in the service of the Government of Northern Nigeria to study sleeping sickness in 1951. He also studied onchocerciasis vectors and helped in monitoring and examining the effectiveness of control measures. Along with John B. Davies, he conducted studies on blackflies in the Galma valley. The work conducted over six years involved catching nearly 13,000 flies over an area of 1000 square miles and dissecting 1200 flies to check for larvae of Onchocerca volvulus. They found nearly 20% of the flies being infected in the rainy season and formulated a DDT spraying scheme to reduce the transmission of the parasite. The scheme has come to be called the Crosskey-Davies Experiment of 1954–1960. He returned from Africa to London in 1959 and began to work as a dipterologist and specialized in the Tachinidae.

Roger illustrated most of his publications by himself. Crosskey revamped the classification of the Simuliidae. Crosskey and Graham B. White used the biogeographical designation of "Afrotropical Region" as a more specific term than the previously used terms such as "Ethiopian region" or "Sub-Saharan Africa". He began to work along with Curtis Sabrosky and became a key member of the ICZN code committee.

The tachinid genera Crosskeya and Crosskeyellum are named in his honour as are nearly a dozen species of flies with the epithet crosskeyi. Crosskey himself described a couple of hundred species and established a few new genera while revising the dipteran groups that he worked on.
