= Prodiaphania testacea =

Scientific classification
- Kingdom: Animalia
- Phylum: Arthropoda
- Clade: Pancrustacea
- Class: Insecta
- Order: Diptera
- Family: Tachinidae
- Subfamily: Dexiinae
- Tribe: Rutiliini
- Genus: Prodiaphania
- Species: P. testacea

Binomial name
- Prodiaphania testacea (Macquart, 1844)

Synonyms
- Diaphania testacea Macquart, 1844

Species of fly

Prodiaphania testacea is a species of fly in the family Tachinidae.

== Distribution ==
Australia.
