= Chetogaster violacea =

Scientific classification
- Kingdom: Animalia
- Phylum: Arthropoda
- Clade: Pancrustacea
- Class: Insecta
- Order: Diptera
- Family: Tachinidae
- Subfamily: Dexiinae
- Tribe: Rutiliini
- Genus: Chetogaster
- Species: C. violacea

Binomial name
- Chetogaster violacea Macquart, 1851

Species of fly

Chetogaster violacea is a species of fly in the family Tachinidae.

== Distribution ==
Australia.
