= Prodiaphania echinomides =

Scientific classification
- Kingdom: Animalia
- Phylum: Arthropoda
- Clade: Pancrustacea
- Class: Insecta
- Order: Diptera
- Family: Tachinidae
- Subfamily: Dexiinae
- Tribe: Rutiliini
- Genus: Prodiaphania
- Species: P. echinomides

Binomial name
- Prodiaphania echinomides (Bigot, 1874)

Synonyms
- Rutilia echinomides Bigot, 1874; Rutilia echinomides Bigot, 1874; Rutilia echinomyidea Bigot, 1880

Species of fly

Prodiaphania echinomides is a species of fly in the family Tachinidae.

== Distribution ==
Australia.
