= Prodiaphania =

Scientific classification
- Kingdom: Animalia
- Phylum: Arthropoda
- Class: Insecta
- Order: Diptera
- Family: Tachinidae
- Subfamily: Dexiinae
- Tribe: Rutiliini
- Genus: Prodiaphania; Townsend, 1927

Type species
- Diaphania testacea Macquart, 1844

Synonyms
- Diaphania Macquart, 1844

Genus of flies

Prodiaphania is a genus of flies in the family Tachinidae.

== Species ==
- Prodiaphania arida Paramonov, 1968
- Prodiaphania biarmata (Malloch, 1936)
- Prodiaphania brevitarsis Paramonov, 1968
- Prodiaphania claripennis Malloch, 1929
- Prodiaphania commoni Paramonov, 1968
- Prodiaphania cygnus (Malloch, 1936)
- Prodiaphania deserta Paramonov, 1968
- Prodiaphania echinomides (Bigot, 1874)
- Prodiaphania fullerae Paramonov, 1968
- Prodiaphania funebris Paramonov, 1968
- Prodiaphania furcata (Malloch, 1936)
- Prodiaphania genitalis Paramonov, 1968
- Prodiaphania georgei Malloch, 1929
- Prodiaphania minuta Paramonov, 1968
- Prodiaphania regina (Malloch, 1936)
- Prodiaphania testacea (Macquart, 1844)
- Prodiaphania victoriae (Malloch, 1936)
- Prodiaphania vittata (Macquart, 1855)
- Prodiaphania walkeri Paramonov, 1968
