= Amphibolia valentina =

Scientific classification
- Kingdom: Animalia
- Phylum: Arthropoda
- Clade: Pancrustacea
- Class: Insecta
- Order: Diptera
- Family: Tachinidae
- Genus: Amphibolia
- Subgenus: Amphibolia
- Species: A. valentina

Binomial name
- Amphibolia valentina Macquart, 1844

Species of fly

Amphibolia valentina is a species of fly in the family Tachinidae.

== Distribution ==
Australia.
