= Pseudoformosia =

Scientific classification
- Kingdom: Animalia
- Phylum: Arthropoda
- Clade: Pancrustacea
- Class: Insecta
- Order: Diptera
- Family: Tachinidae
- Genus: Formosia
- Subgenus: Pseudoformosia; Brauer & von Bergenstamm, 1889

Type species
- Formosia moneta Gerstaecker, 1860

Synonyms
- Laccura Enderlein, 1936

Subgenus of flies

Pseudoformosia is a subgenus of flies in the family Tachinidae.

== Species ==
- Formosia excelsa (Walker, 1861)
- Formosia moneta Gerstaecker, 1860
- Formosia paupera Meijere, 1904
- Formosia saturatissima (Walker, 1861)
