= Amphibolia stolida =

Scientific classification
- Kingdom: Animalia
- Phylum: Arthropoda
- Clade: Pancrustacea
- Class: Insecta
- Order: Diptera
- Family: Tachinidae
- Genus: Amphibolia
- Subgenus: Paramphibolia
- Species: A. stolida

Binomial name
- Amphibolia stolida (Malloch, 1929)

Synonyms
- Chaetogastrina stolida Malloch, 1929

Species of fly

Amphibolia stolida is a species of fly in the family Tachinidae.

== Distribution ==
Australia.
