= Formosia moneta =

Scientific classification
- Kingdom: Animalia
- Phylum: Arthropoda
- Clade: Pancrustacea
- Class: Insecta
- Order: Diptera
- Family: Tachinidae
- Genus: Formosia
- Subgenus: Pseudoformosia
- Species: F. moneta

Binomial name
- Formosia moneta Gerstaecker, 1860

Species of fly

Formosia moneta is a species of fly in the family Tachinidae.

== Distribution ==
Western New Guinea, Papua New Guinea.
