= Formosia (subgenus) =

Scientific classification
- Kingdom: Animalia
- Phylum: Arthropoda
- Clade: Pancrustacea
- Class: Insecta
- Order: Diptera
- Family: Tachinidae
- Genus: Formosia
- Subgenus: Formosia; Guerin-Meneville, 1843

Type species
- Rutilia mirabilis Guerin-Meneville, 1831

Synonyms
- Pancala Enderlein, 1936

Subgenus of flies

Formosia is a subgenus of flies in the family Tachinidae.

== Species ==
- Formosia blattina (Enderlein, 1936)
- Formosia bracteata (Enderlein, 1936)
- Formosia callipygos Gerstaecker, 1860
- Formosia eos (Enderlein, 1936)
- Formosia fervens (Walker, 1861)
- Formosia flavipennis (Macquart, 1848)
- Formosia gemmata (Enderlein, 1936)
- Formosia glorificans (Walker, 1861)
- Formosia heinrichiana (Enderlein, 1936)
- Formosia heinrothi (Enderlein, 1936)
- Formosia mirabilis (Guerin-Meneville, 1831)
- Formosia solomonicola Baranov, 1936
- Formosia viridiventris Crosskey, 1973
