= Euamphibolia =

Scientific classification
- Kingdom: Animalia
- Phylum: Arthropoda
- Clade: Pancrustacea
- Class: Insecta
- Order: Diptera
- Family: Tachinidae
- Genus: Formosia
- Subgenus: Euamphibolia; Townsend, 1916

Type species
- Rutilia fulvipes Guerin-Meneville, 1843

Synonyms
- Hega Enderlein, 1936; Chromocharis Enderlein, 1936

Subgenus of flies

Euamphibolia is a subgenus of flies in the family Tachinidae.

== Species ==
- Formosia atribasis (Walker, 1861)
- Formosia complicita (Walker, 1861)
- Formosia faceta (Enderlein, 1936)
- Formosia fusca Crosskey, 1973
- Formosia smaragdina Malloch, 1929
- Formosia speciosa (Erichson, 1842)
