= Formosia =

Scientific classification
- Kingdom: Animalia
- Phylum: Arthropoda
- Class: Insecta
- Order: Diptera
- Family: Tachinidae
- Subfamily: Dexiinae
- Tribe: Rutiliini
- Genus: Formosia; Guerin-Meneville, 1843

Type species
- Rutilia mirabilis Guerin-Meneville, 1831

Synonyms
- Pancala Enderlein, 1936

Genus of flies

Formosia is a genus of flies in the family Tachinidae.

== Species & subgenera ==
- Euamphibolia Townsend, 1916

- Formosia atribasis (Walker, 1861)
- Formosia complicita (Walker, 1861)
- Formosia engeli (Enderlein, 1936)
- Formosia faceta (Enderlein, 1936)
- Formosia fusca Crosskey, 1973
- Formosia smaragdina Malloch, 1929
- Formosia speciosa (Erichson, 1842)

- Formosia Guerin-Meneville, 1843

- Formosia blattina (Enderlein, 1936)
- Formosia bracteata (Enderlein, 1936)
- Formosia callipygos Gerstaecker, 1860
- Formosia eos (Enderlein, 1936)
- Formosia fervens (Walker, 1861)
- Formosia flavipennis (Macquart, 1848)
- Formosia gemmata (Enderlein, 1936)
- Formosia glorificans (Walker, 1861)
- Formosia heinrichiana (Enderlein, 1936)
- Formosia heinrothi (Enderlein, 1936)
- Formosia mirabilis (Guerin-Meneville, 1831)
- Formosia solomonicola Baranov, 1936
- Formosia viridiventris Crosskey, 1973

- Pseudoformosia Brauer & von Bergenstamm, 1889

- Formosia excelsa (Walker, 1861)
- Formosia moneta Gerstaecker, 1860
- Formosia paupera Meijere, 1904
- Formosia saturatissima (Walker, 1861)
