= Chetogaster =

Scientific classification
- Kingdom: Animalia
- Phylum: Arthropoda
- Clade: Pancrustacea
- Class: Insecta
- Order: Diptera
- Family: Tachinidae
- Subfamily: Dexiinae
- Tribe: Rutiliini
- Genus: Chetogaster; Macquart, 1851

Type species
- Chetogaster violacea Macquart, 1851

Synonyms
- Chaetogaster Macquart, 1851; Codium Enderlein, 1936

Genus of flies

Chetogaster is a genus of flies in the family Tachinidae.

== Species ==
- Chetogaster argentifera Malloch, 1936
- Chetogaster auriceps Paramonov, 1968
- Chetogaster canberrae Paramonov, 1954
- Chetogaster oblonga (Macquart, 1847)
- Chetogaster violacea Macquart, 1851
- Chetogaster viridis Malloch, 1936
