= Amphibolia (subgenus) =

Scientific classification
- Kingdom: Animalia
- Phylum: Arthropoda
- Clade: Pancrustacea
- Class: Insecta
- Order: Diptera
- Family: Tachinidae
- Genus: Amphibolia
- Subgenus: Amphibolia; Macquart, 1844

Type species
- Amphibolia valentina Macquart, 1844

Subgenus of flies

Amphibolia is a subgenus of bristle flies in the family Tachinidae.

== Species ==
- Amphibolia albocincta (Malloch, 1930)
- Amphibolia campbelli Paramonov, 1950
- Amphibolia commoni Paramonov, 1968
- Amphibolia ignorata Paramonov, 1950
- Amphibolia papuana Crosskey, 1973
- Amphibolia valentina Macquart, 1844
- Amphibolia wilsoni Paramonov, 1950
