= Formosia mirabilis =

Scientific classification
- Kingdom: Animalia
- Phylum: Arthropoda
- Clade: Pancrustacea
- Class: Insecta
- Order: Diptera
- Family: Tachinidae
- Genus: Formosia
- Subgenus: Formosia
- Species: F. mirabilis

Binomial name
- Formosia mirabilis (Guerin-Meneville, 1831)

Synonyms
- Rutilia mirabilis Guerin-Meneville, 1831

Species of fly

Formosia mirabilis is a species of fly in the family Tachinidae.

== Distribution ==
Indonesia.
