= Formodexia =

Scientific classification
- Kingdom: Animalia
- Phylum: Arthropoda
- Class: Insecta
- Order: Diptera
- Family: Tachinidae
- Subfamily: Dexiinae
- Tribe: Rutiliini
- Genus: Formodexia; Crosskey, 1973

Type species
- Rutilia volucelloides Walker, 1861

Genus of flies

Formodexia is a genus of flies in the family Tachinidae.

== Species ==
- Formodexia volucelloides (Walker, 1861)

== Distribution ==
Indonesia.
