= Formosia speciosa =

Scientific classification
- Kingdom: Animalia
- Phylum: Arthropoda
- Clade: Pancrustacea
- Class: Insecta
- Order: Diptera
- Family: Tachinidae
- Genus: Formosia
- Subgenus: Euamphibolia
- Species: F. speciosa

Binomial name
- Formosia speciosa (Erichson, 1842)

Synonyms
- Rutilia speciosa Erichson, 1842

Species of fly

Formosia speciosa is a species of fly in the family Tachinidae. It's also known as the Giant Black and White Fly.

== Distribution ==
Australia.
