= Paramphibolia =

Scientific classification
- Kingdom: Animalia
- Phylum: Arthropoda
- Clade: Pancrustacea
- Class: Insecta
- Order: Diptera
- Family: Tachinidae
- Genus: Amphibolia
- Subgenus: Paramphibolia; Brauer & von Bergenstamm, 1891

Type species
- Rutilia assimilis Macquart, 1851

Synonyms
- Chaetogastrina Malloch, 1929

Subgenus of flies

Paramphibolia is a subgenus of bristle flies in the family Tachinidae.

== Species ==
- Amphibolia assimilis (Macquart, 1851)
- Amphibolia stolida (Malloch, 1929)
