= Chrysopasta =

Scientific classification
- Kingdom: Animalia
- Phylum: Arthropoda
- Clade: Pancrustacea
- Class: Insecta
- Order: Diptera
- Family: Tachinidae
- Subfamily: Dexiinae
- Tribe: Rutiliini
- Genus: Chrysopasta; Brauer & von Bergenstamm, 1889

Type species
- Rutilia elegans Macquart, 1846

Synonyms
- Roederia Brauer & von Bergenstamm, 1893; Echrysopasta Townsend, 1932; Euchrysopasta Paramonov, 1968

Genus of flies

Chrysopasta elegans feeding on the pollen and nectar from a flower

Chrysopasta is a genus of flies in the family Tachinidae.

== Species ==
- Chrysopasta elegans (Macquart, 1846)

== Distribution ==
Australia.
