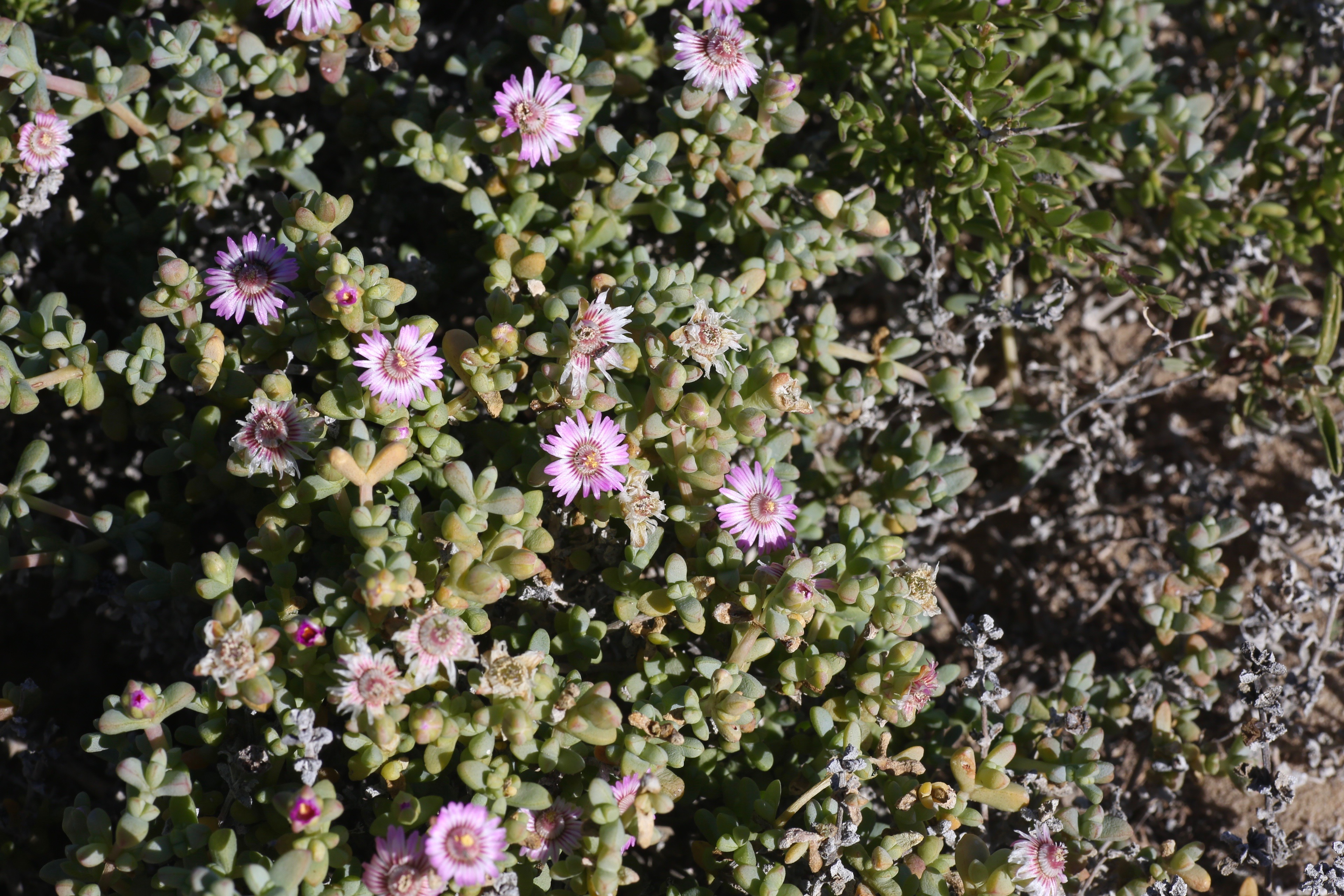
- A. maritima

Scientific classification
- Kingdom: Animalia
- Phylum: Arthropoda
- Clade: Pancrustacea
- Class: Insecta
- Order: Diptera
- Family: Tachinidae
- Subfamily: Dexiinae
- Tribe: Rutiliini
- Genus: Amphibolia; Macquart, 1844

Type species
- Amphibolia valentina Macquart, 1844

= Amphibolia (fly) =

Genus of flies

Amphibolia is a genus of bristle flies in the family Tachinidae.

== Subgenera and species ==
- Amphibolia Macquart, 1844
  - Amphibolia albocincta (Malloch, 1930)
  - Amphibolia campbelli Paramonov, 1950
  - Amphibolia commoni Paramonov, 1968
  - Amphibolia ignorata Paramonov, 1950
  - Amphibolia papuana Crosskey, 1973
  - Amphibolia valentina Macquart, 1844
  - Amphibolia wilsoni Paramonov, 1950
- Paramphibolia Brauer & von Bergenstamm, 1891
  - Amphibolia assimilis (Macquart, 1851)
  - Amphibolia stolida (Malloch, 1929)
