= Amphibolia assimilis =

Scientific classification
- Kingdom: Animalia
- Phylum: Arthropoda
- Clade: Pancrustacea
- Class: Insecta
- Order: Diptera
- Family: Tachinidae
- Genus: Amphibolia
- Subgenus: Paramphibolia
- Species: A. assimilis

Binomial name
- Amphibolia assimilis (Macquart, 1851)

Synonyms
- Rutilia assimilis Macquart, 1851

Species of fly

Amphibolia assimilis is a species of fly in the family Tachinidae.

== Distribution ==
Australia.
