= Rutilodexia =

Scientific classification
- Kingdom: Animalia
- Phylum: Arthropoda
- Class: Insecta
- Order: Diptera
- Family: Tachinidae
- Subfamily: Dexiinae
- Tribe: Rutiliini
- Genus: Rutilodexia; Townsend, 1915

Type species
- Rutilia angustipennis Walker, 1858

Synonyms
- Tutilodexia Townsend, 1928; Bothrostira Enderlein, 1936; Rutilosia Paramonov, 1968

Genus of flies

Rutilodexia is a genus of parasitic flies in the family Tachinidae.

== Species ==
- Rutilodexia angustipennis (Walker, 1858)
- Rutilodexia papua (Bigot, 1880)
- Rutilodexia prisca (Enderlein, 1936)
