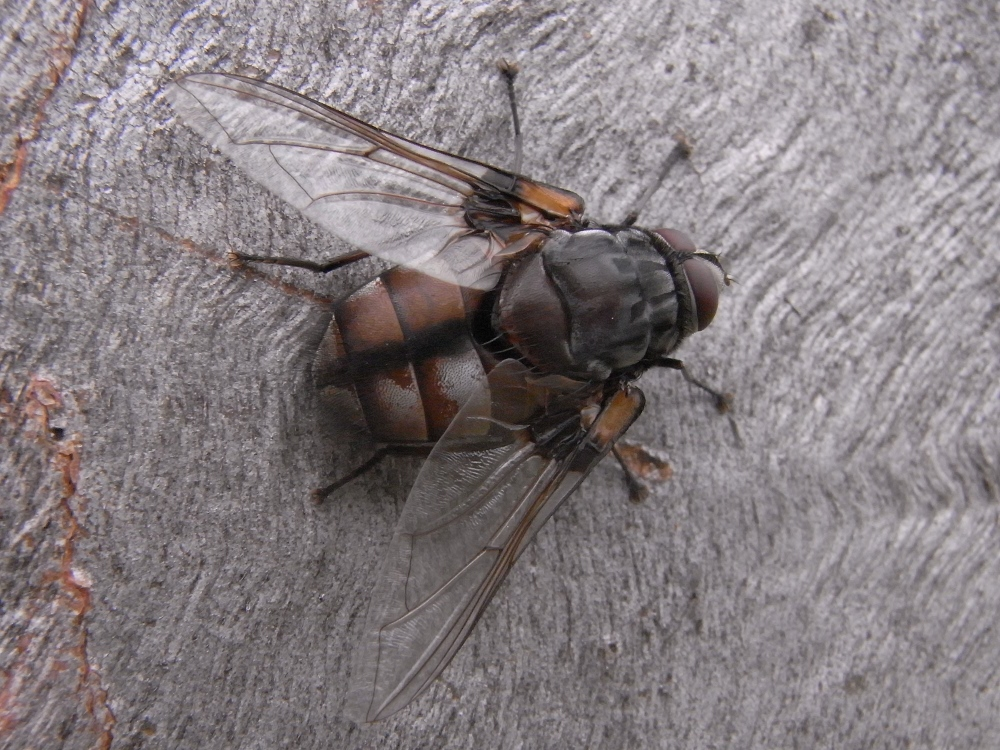
- Rutilia vivipara (?)

Scientific classification
- Kingdom: Animalia
- Phylum: Arthropoda
- Class: Insecta
- Order: Diptera
- Family: Tachinidae
- Subfamily: Dexiinae
- Tribe: Rutiliini; Malloch, 1929

= Rutiliini =

Tribe of flies

Rutiliini is a tribe of flies in the family Tachinidae.

== Genera ==
- Amphibolia Macquart, 1844
- Chetogaster Macquart, 1851
- Chrysopasta Brauer & von Bergenstamm, 1889
- Formodexia Crosskey, 1973
- Formosia Guerin-Meneville, 1843
- Prodiaphania Townsend, 1927
- Rutilia Robineau-Desvoidy, 1830
- Rutilodexia Townsend, 1915
