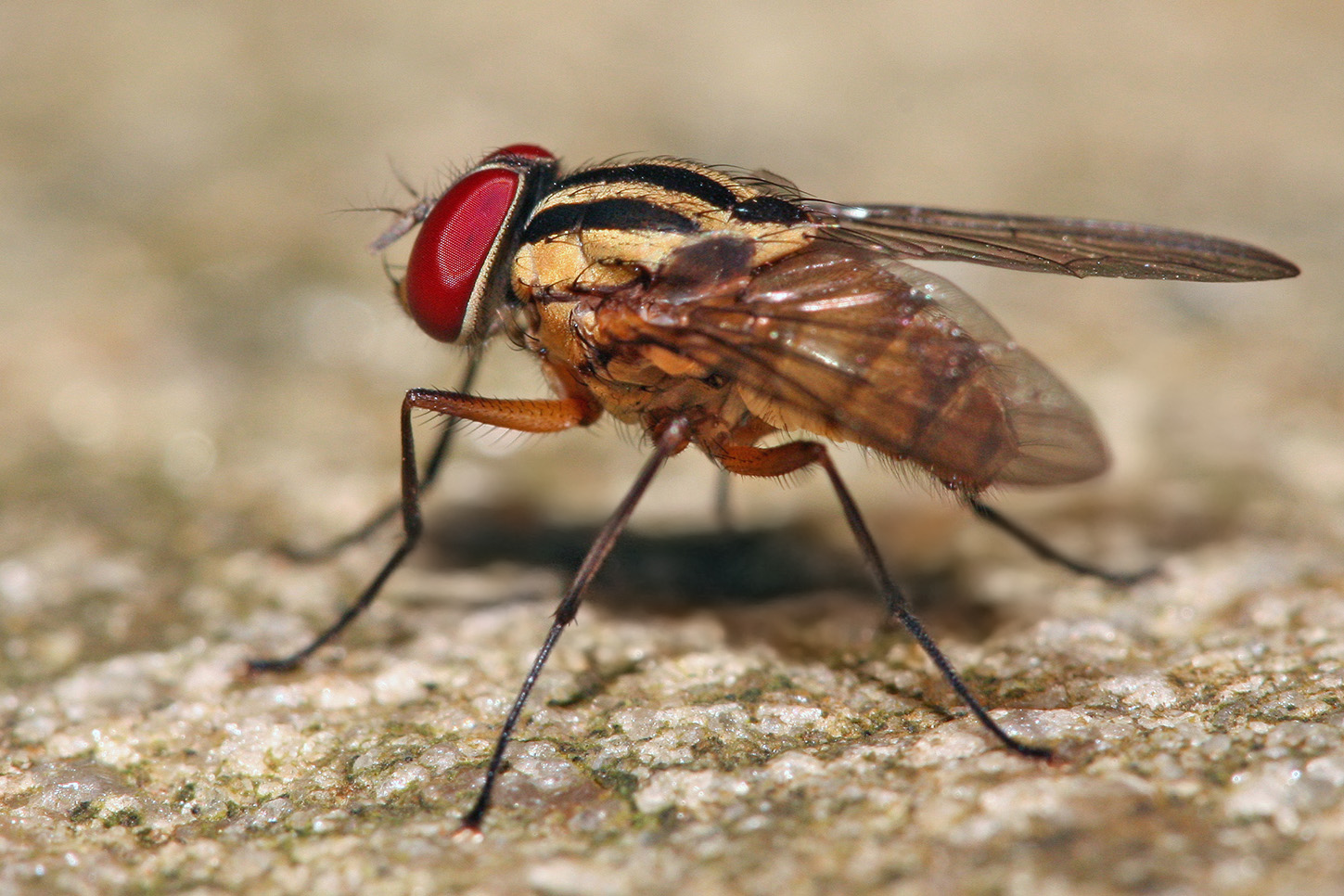
- Graphomya eustolia

Scientific classification
- Kingdom: Animalia
- Phylum: Arthropoda
- Clade: Pancrustacea
- Class: Insecta
- Order: Diptera
- Family: Muscidae
- Subfamily: Mydaeinae; Verrall, 1888

Genera
- See text

= Mydaeinae =

Subfamily of flies

The Mydaeinae are a subfamily of true flies, belonging to the family Muscidae.

== Genera ==
- Brontaea Kowarz, 1873
- Graphomya Robineau-Desvoidy, 1830
- Hebecnema Schnabl, 1889
- Hemichlora Van der Wulp, 1896
- Mydaea Robineau-Desvoidy, 1830
- Myospila Rondani, 1856
- Scenetes Malloch, 1936
- Scutellomusca Townsend, 1931
