= Pygophora =

Pygophora may refer to:

- Pygophora (crustacean), a family of crustaceans
- Pygophora (fly), a genus of flies

== See also ==
- Pygophorinia
