= Caricea erythrocera =

Scientific classification
- Domain: Eukaryota
- Kingdom: Animalia
- Phylum: Arthropoda
- Class: Insecta
- Order: Diptera
- Family: Muscidae
- Tribe: Coenosiini
- Genus: Caricea
- Species: C. erythrocera

Binomial name
- Caricea erythrocera Robineau-desvoidy, 1830

Synonyms
- Anthomyza lacteipennis Zetterstedt, 1845; Coenosia diversa Stein, 1901; Lispocephala sexnotata Stein, 1901

Species of fly

Caricea erythrocera is a species of house flies in the family Muscidae. It is found in Europe.
