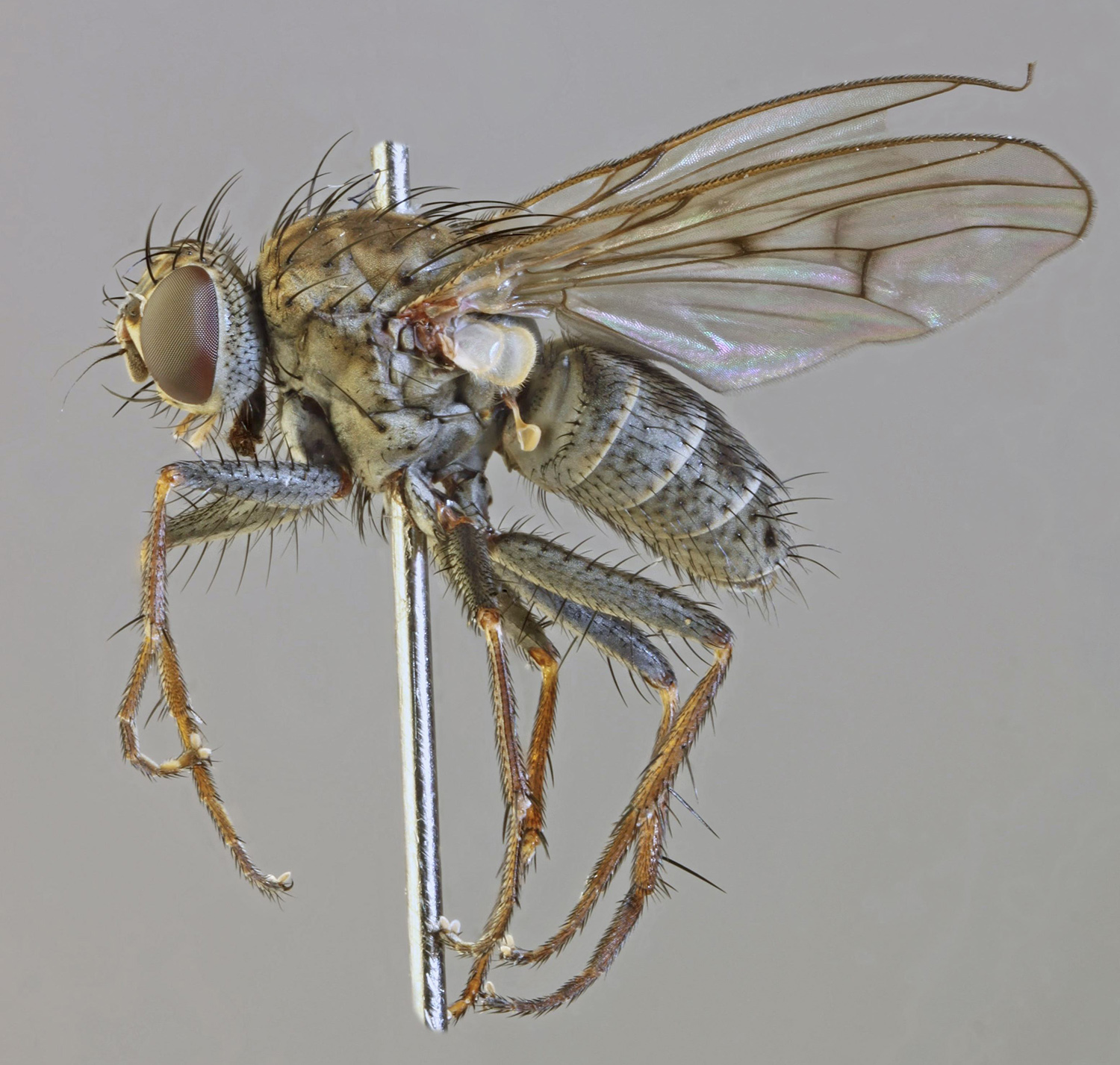
- Lispocephala_alma
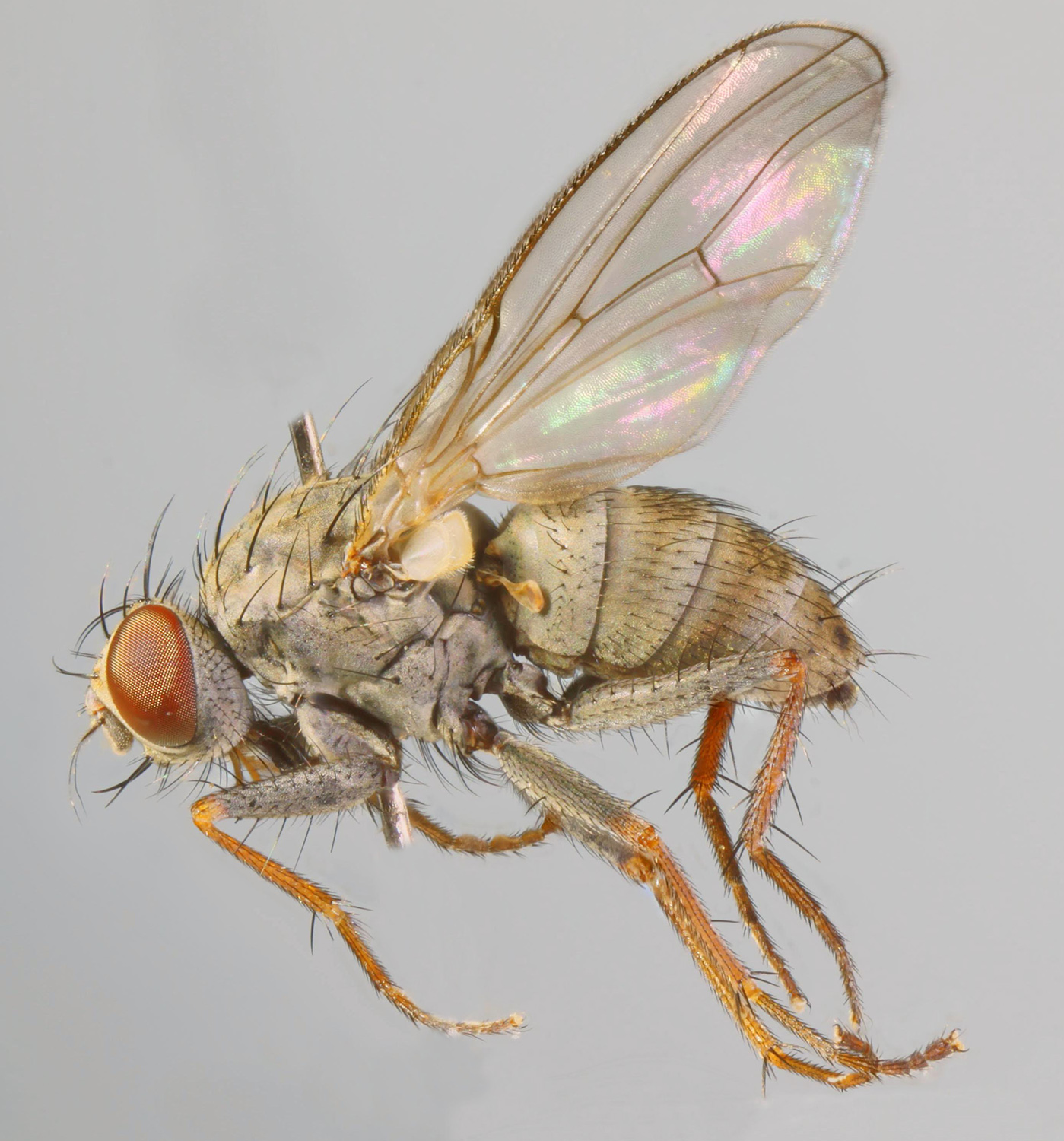
- Lispocephala_erythrocera

Scientific classification
- Kingdom: Animalia
- Phylum: Arthropoda
- Class: Insecta
- Order: Diptera
- Family: Muscidae
- Subfamily: Coenosiinae
- Tribe: Coenosiini
- Genus: Lispocephala; Pokorny, 1893

Type species
- Anthomyia alma Meigen, 1826

= Lispocephala =

Genus of flies

Lispocephala is a very large genus of true flies of the family Muscidae.

== Description ==
frons are broad in both sexes. There are two orbital setae and two frontal setae on each fronta-orbital plate.

== Biology ==
The biology of the genus is, at present unknown, only a pupa of one species (L. alma) has been described. Some Lispocephala are known to be specialized predators on Drosophilidae in the Hawaiian Islands.

== Species ==
- L. alma (Meigen, 1826)
- L. bistriata (Stein, 1908)
- L. brachialis (Rondani, 1877)
- L. erythrocera (Robineau-Desvoidy, 1830)
- L. falculata Collin, 1963
- L. fuscitibia Ringdahl, 1944
- L. mikii (Strobl, 1893)
- L. pallipalpis (Zetterstedt, 1845)
- L. rubricornis (Zetterstedt, 1849)
- L. spuria (Zetterstedt, 1838)
- L. ungulata (Rondani, 1866)
- L. verna (Fabricius, 1794)
