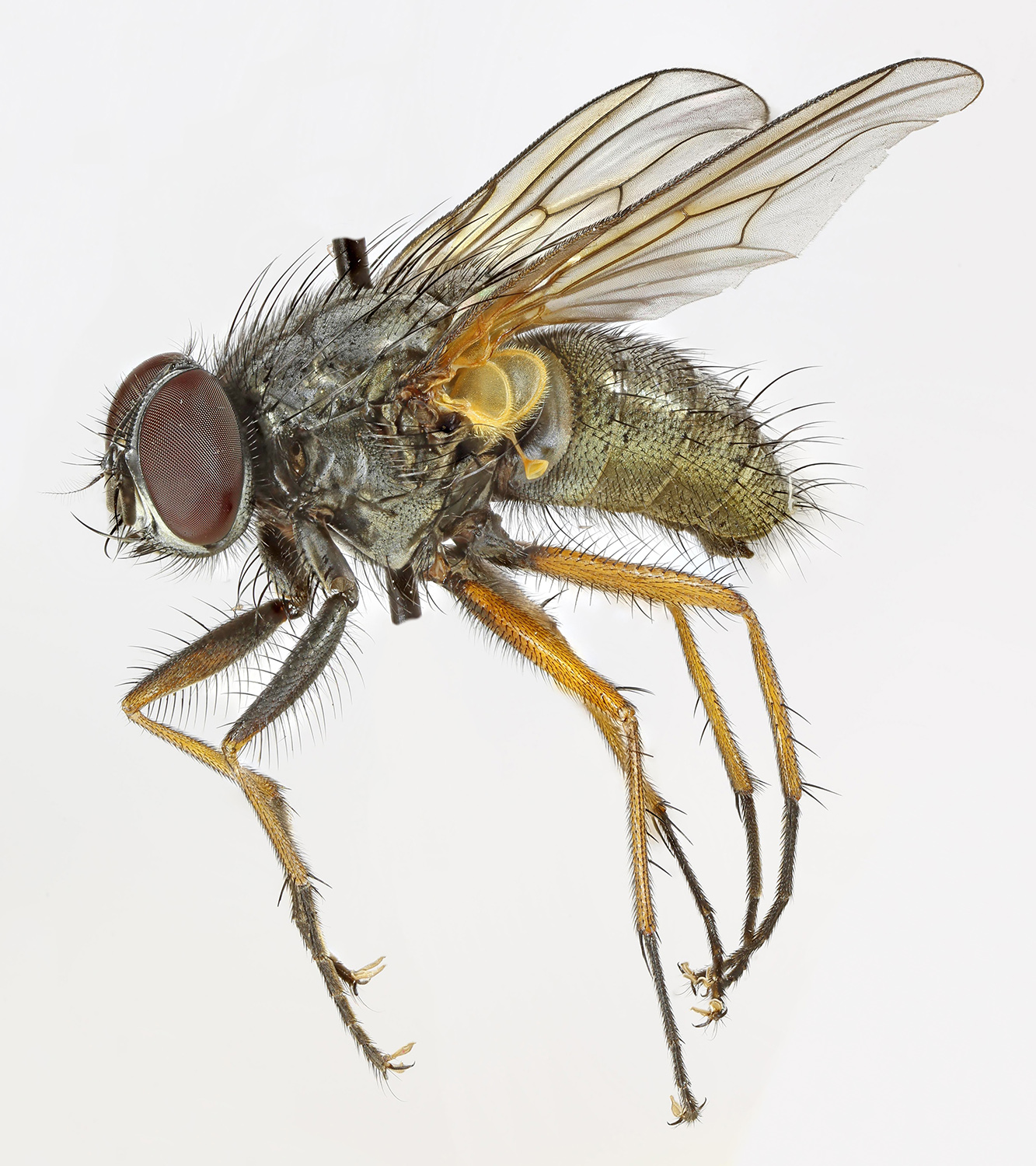
- Mydaea urbana North Wales

Scientific classification
- Kingdom: Animalia
- Phylum: Arthropoda
- Clade: Pancrustacea
- Class: Insecta
- Order: Diptera
- Family: Muscidae
- Genus: Mydaea
- Species: M. urbana

Binomial name
- Mydaea urbana (Meigen, 1826)

= Mydaea urbana =

Species of fly

Mydaea urbana is a fly from the family Muscidae. It is found in the Palearctic.
