= Caricea alma =

Scientific classification
- Domain: Eukaryota
- Kingdom: Animalia
- Phylum: Arthropoda
- Class: Insecta
- Order: Diptera
- Family: Muscidae
- Genus: Caricea
- Species: C. alma

Binomial name
- Caricea alma (Meigen, 1826)

Synonyms
- Anthomyia alma Meigen, 1826

Species of fly

Caricea alma is a species of house flies, etc. in the family Muscidae.
