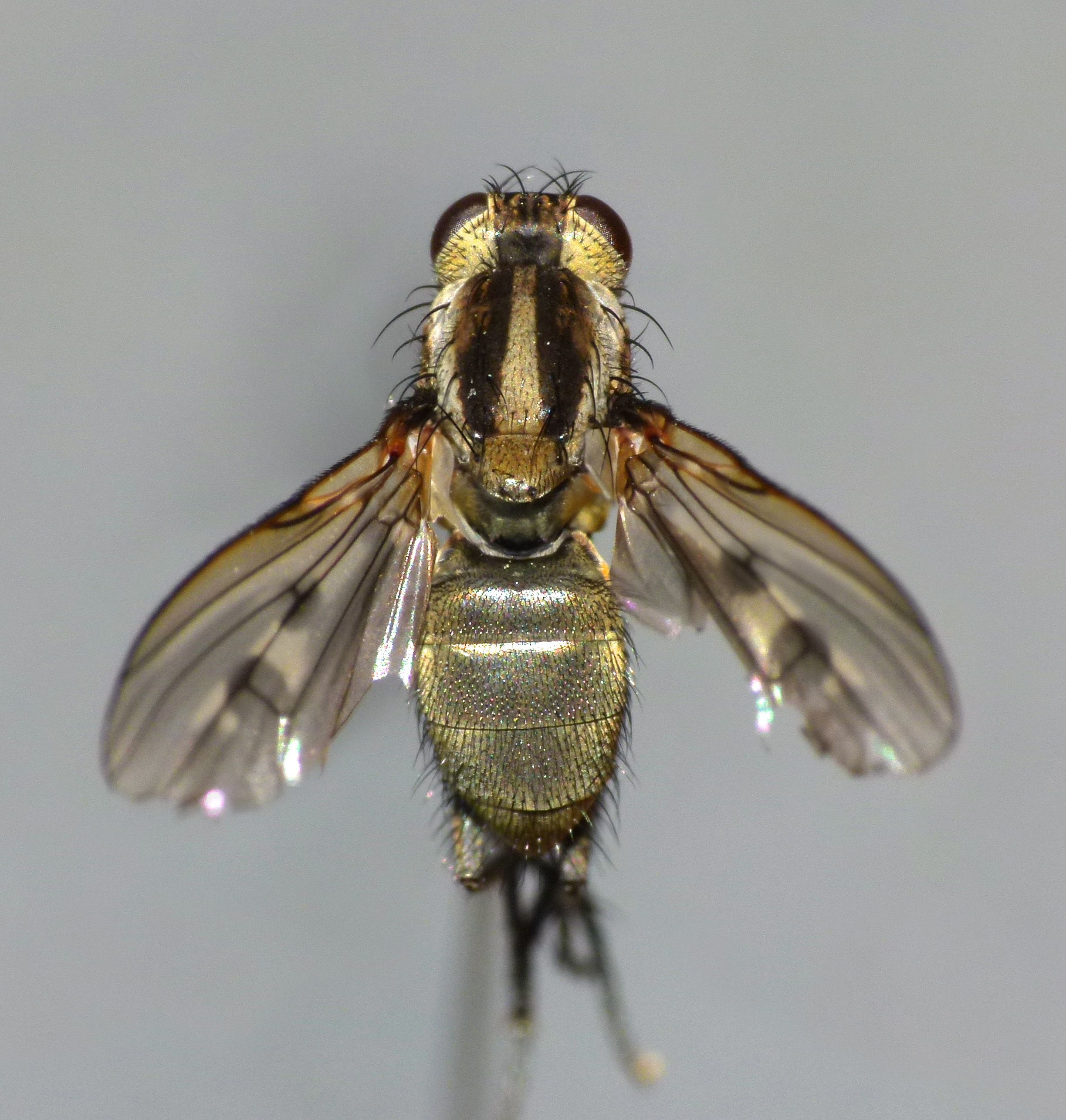
- Limnohelina bivittata from McPhees Rock / Loganburn Reservoir, Otago, NZ (dorsal view)

Scientific classification
- Kingdom: Animalia
- Phylum: Arthropoda
- Class: Insecta
- Order: Diptera
- Family: Muscidae
- Subfamily: Coenosiinae
- Tribe: Limnophorini
- Genus: Limnohelina; Malloch, 1930

= Limnohelina =

Genus of flies

Limnohelina is a genus of flies in the family Muscidae.

== Species ==
- Limnohelina bivittata
- Limnohelina debilis
- Limnohelina dorsovittata
- Limnohelina grisea
- Limnohelina huttoni
- Limnohelina nelsoni
- Limnohelina nigripes
- Limnohelina smithii
- Limnohelina spinipes
- Limnohelina uniformis
