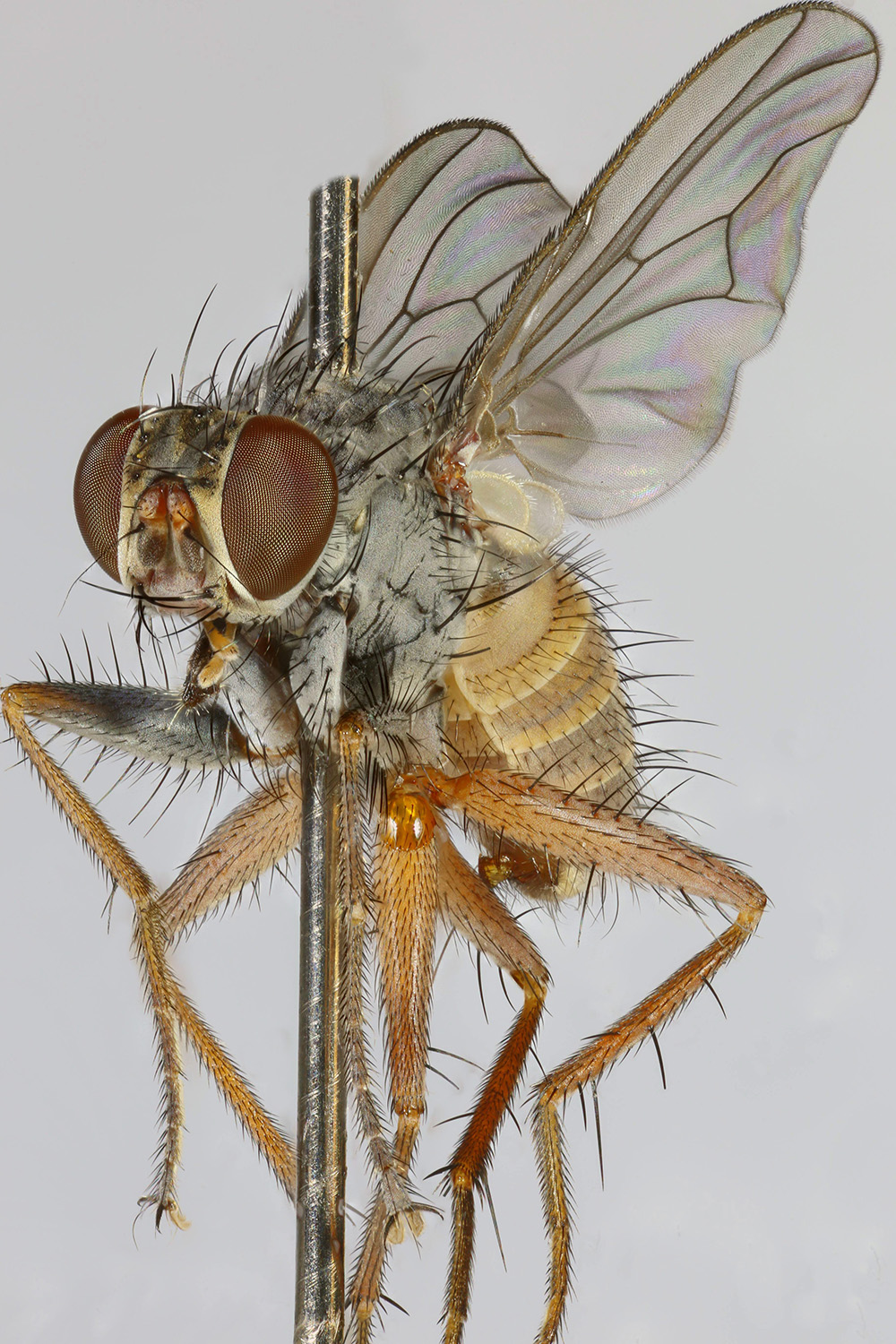

Scientific classification
- Kingdom: Animalia
- Phylum: Arthropoda
- Clade: Pancrustacea
- Class: Insecta
- Order: Diptera
- Family: Muscidae
- Genus: Lispocephala
- Species: L. brachialis

Binomial name
- Lispocephala brachialis (Rondani, 1877)

Synonyms
- Coenosia brachialis Rondani, 1877

= Lispocephala brachialis =

Species of fly

Lispocephala brachialis is a fly from the family Muscidae.

== Description ==
A small fly of 4–5.5mm, and distinctly more yellow that other species of the same genus. All tarsi dark at the apex. Legs are yellow, apart from the front femora.

== Distribution ==
Rare in Great Britain (England only), More common in Central and Southern Europe, as far south as North Africa.
