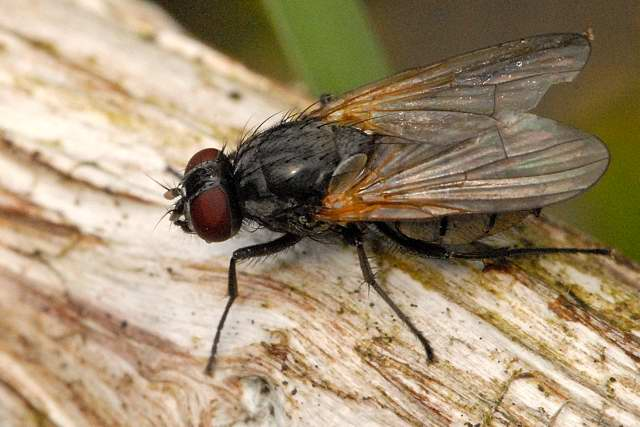

Scientific classification
- Kingdom: Animalia
- Phylum: Arthropoda
- Clade: Pancrustacea
- Class: Insecta
- Order: Diptera
- Family: Muscidae
- Genus: Mydaea
- Species: M. ancilla

Binomial name
- Mydaea ancilla (Meigen, 1826)

Synonyms
- Anthomyia ancilla Meigen, 1826; Anthomyia praeterita Walker, 1853; Mydaea praeterita (Walker, 1853)

= Mydaea ancilla =

Species of fly

Mydaea ancilla is a fly from the family Muscidae.
