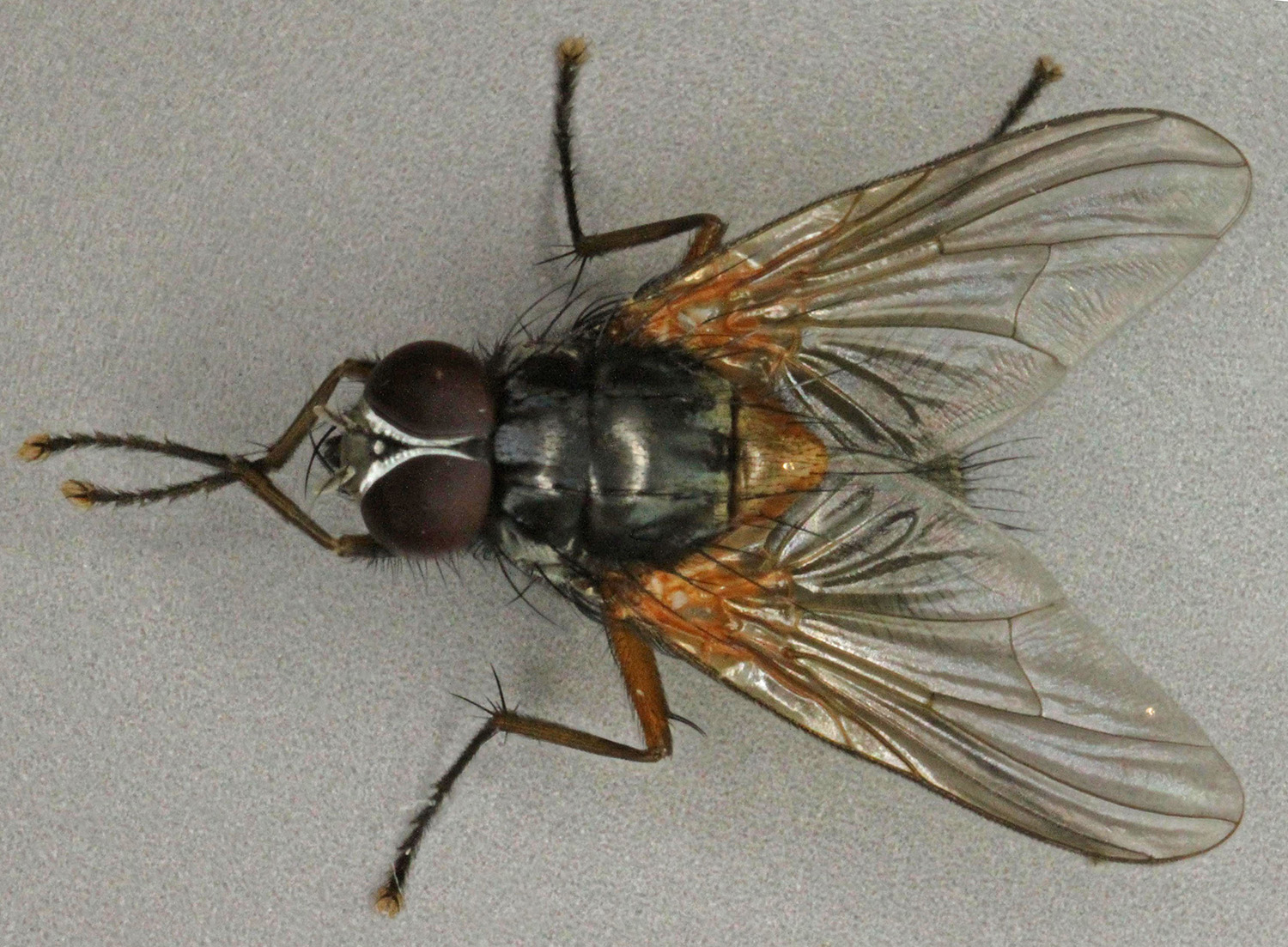

Scientific classification
- Kingdom: Animalia
- Phylum: Arthropoda
- Clade: Pancrustacea
- Class: Insecta
- Order: Diptera
- Family: Muscidae
- Genus: Mydaea
- Species: M. setifemur

Binomial name
- Mydaea setifemur Ringdahl, 1924

= Mydaea setifemur =

Species of fly

Mydaea setifemur is a fly from the family Muscidae.
