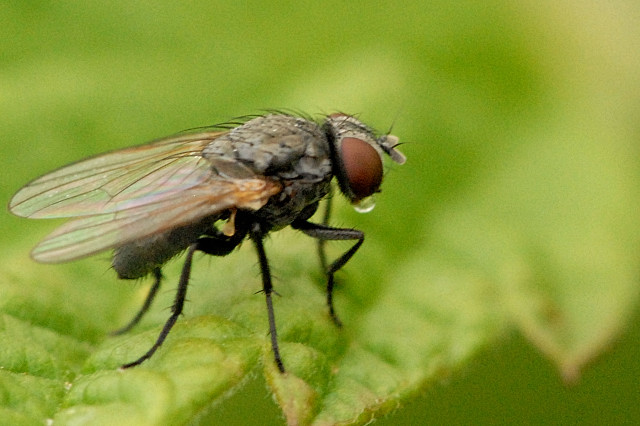

Scientific classification
- Kingdom: Animalia
- Phylum: Arthropoda
- Clade: Pancrustacea
- Class: Insecta
- Order: Diptera
- Family: Muscidae
- Genus: Hebecnema
- Species: H. umbratica

Binomial name
- Hebecnema umbratica (Meigen, 1826)

Synonyms
- Anthomyia umbratica Meigen, 1826; Anthomyia debilis Walker, 1853; Hebecnema debilis (Walker, 1853)

= Hebecnema umbratica =

Species of fly

Hebecnema umbratica is a fly from the family Muscidae. It is the type species of the genus Hebecnema.

== Description ==
See Morphology of Diptera for terms. Eyes densely long· (male) or short- (female) haired. The abdomen, seen from behind, with (male) rather dense grey dusting and a sharply defined narrow median dark line, or (female) with thin dusting and a broader, less sharply defined dark median area and faint shifting dark spots. The female thorax, seen from in front, with 4 faint but more or less distinct darker stripes; frontal triangle, seen from slightly behind, usually extending almost to lunule. 3.5–6 mm.
