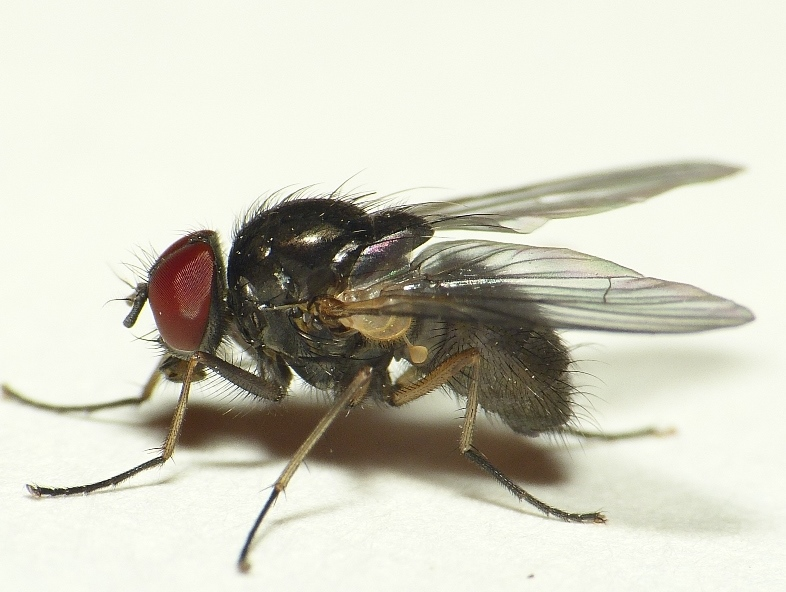
- Hebecnema nigricolor Netherlands

Scientific classification
- Kingdom: Animalia
- Phylum: Arthropoda
- Clade: Pancrustacea
- Class: Insecta
- Order: Diptera
- Family: Muscidae
- Genus: Hebecnema
- Species: H. nigricolor

Binomial name
- Hebecnema nigricolor (Fallen, 1825)

= Hebecnema nigricolor =

Species of fly

Hebecnema nigricolor is a fly from the family Muscidae. It is found in the Palearctic.
