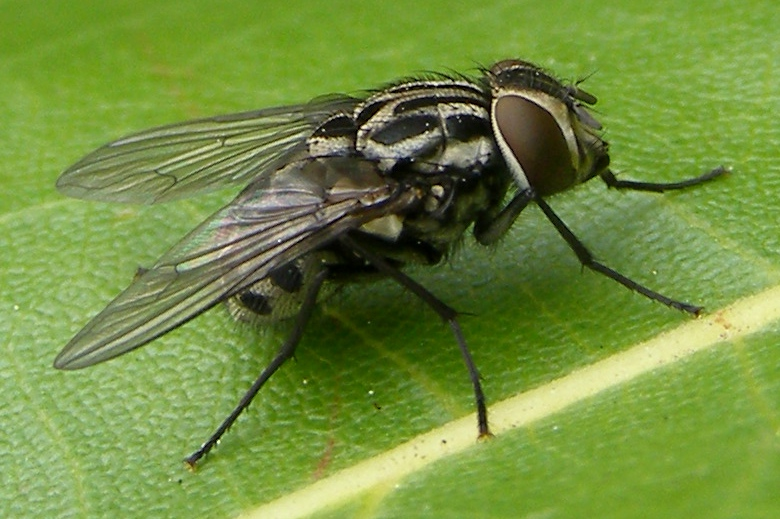
- Female Graphomya maculata

Scientific classification
- Kingdom: Animalia
- Phylum: Arthropoda
- Class: Insecta
- Order: Diptera
- Family: Muscidae
- Genus: Graphomya
- Species: G. maculata

Binomial name
- Graphomya maculata (Scopoli, 1763)

Synonyms
- Graphomya compuncta (Harris, 1780); Graphomya maculata (Harris, 1780); Musca compuncta Harris, 1780; Musca maculata Harris, 1780; Musca maculata Scopoli, 1763

= Graphomya maculata =

Species of fly

Graphomya maculata is a species of fly. It is widespread and common in most parts of Europe and also occurs in North Africa including the Canary Islands. The thorax bears the same black and white pattern in both sexes. Females also have a black and white abdomen, while the male has orange colouration on the abdomen as seen in the picture.

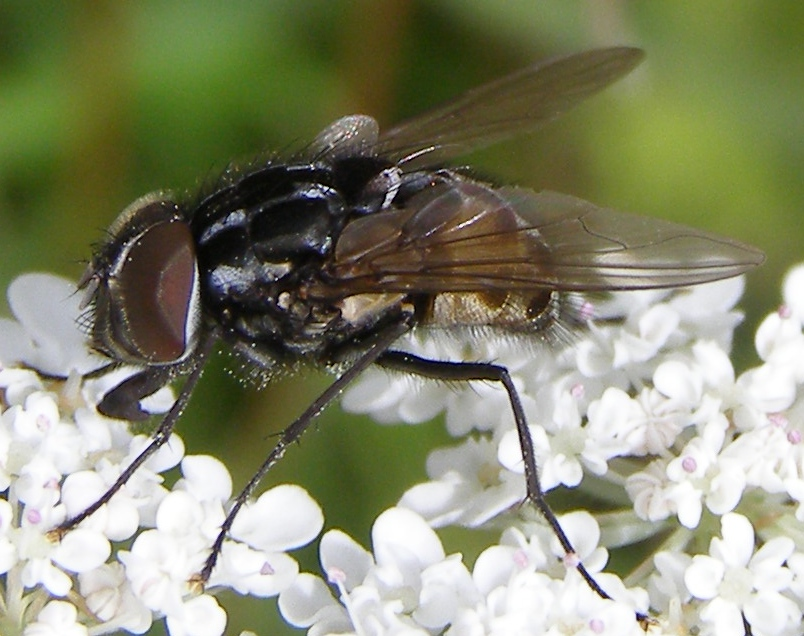
A male Graphomya maculata

While adults are not predatory and can be found nectaring on flowers in meadows, hedge rows, and roadside vegetation, the larvae are predatory, feeding in muddy pools and damp leaf litter.
