= Brontaea =

Scientific classification
- Kingdom: Animalia
- Phylum: Arthropoda
- Clade: Pancrustacea
- Class: Insecta
- Order: Diptera
- Family: Muscidae
- Subfamily: Mydaeinae
- Genus: Brontaea; Kowarz, 1873

Genus of flies

Brontaea is a genus of house flies in the family Muscidae. There are about five described species in Brontaea.

== Species ==
These five species belong to the genus Brontaea:

- Brontaea cilifera (Malloch, 1920)^{i}
- Brontaea debilis (Williston, 1896)^{i}
- Brontaea delecta^{b}
- Brontaea humilis (Zetterstedt, 1860)^{i b}
- Brontaea quadristigma (Thomson, 1869)^{i}

Data sources: i = ITIS, c = Catalogue of Life, g = GBIF, b = Bugguide.net
