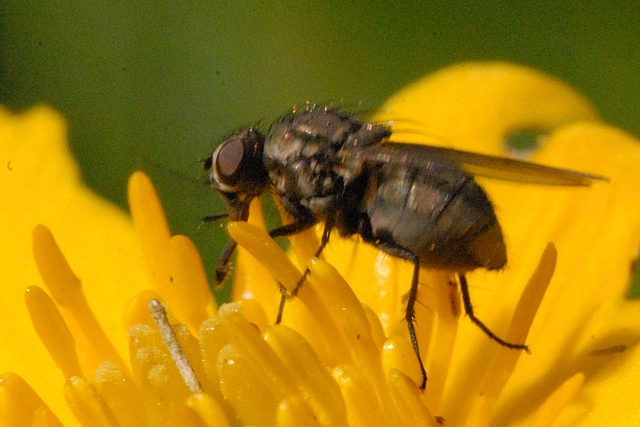
- Mydaea nebulosa

Scientific classification
- Kingdom: Animalia
- Phylum: Arthropoda
- Clade: Pancrustacea
- Class: Insecta
- Order: Diptera
- Family: Muscidae
- Genus: Mydaea
- Species: M. nebulosa

Binomial name
- Mydaea nebulosa (Stein, 1893)

Synonyms
- Spilogaster nebulosa Stein, 1893

= Mydaea nebulosa =

Species of fly

Mydaea nebulosa is a fly from the family Muscidae.
