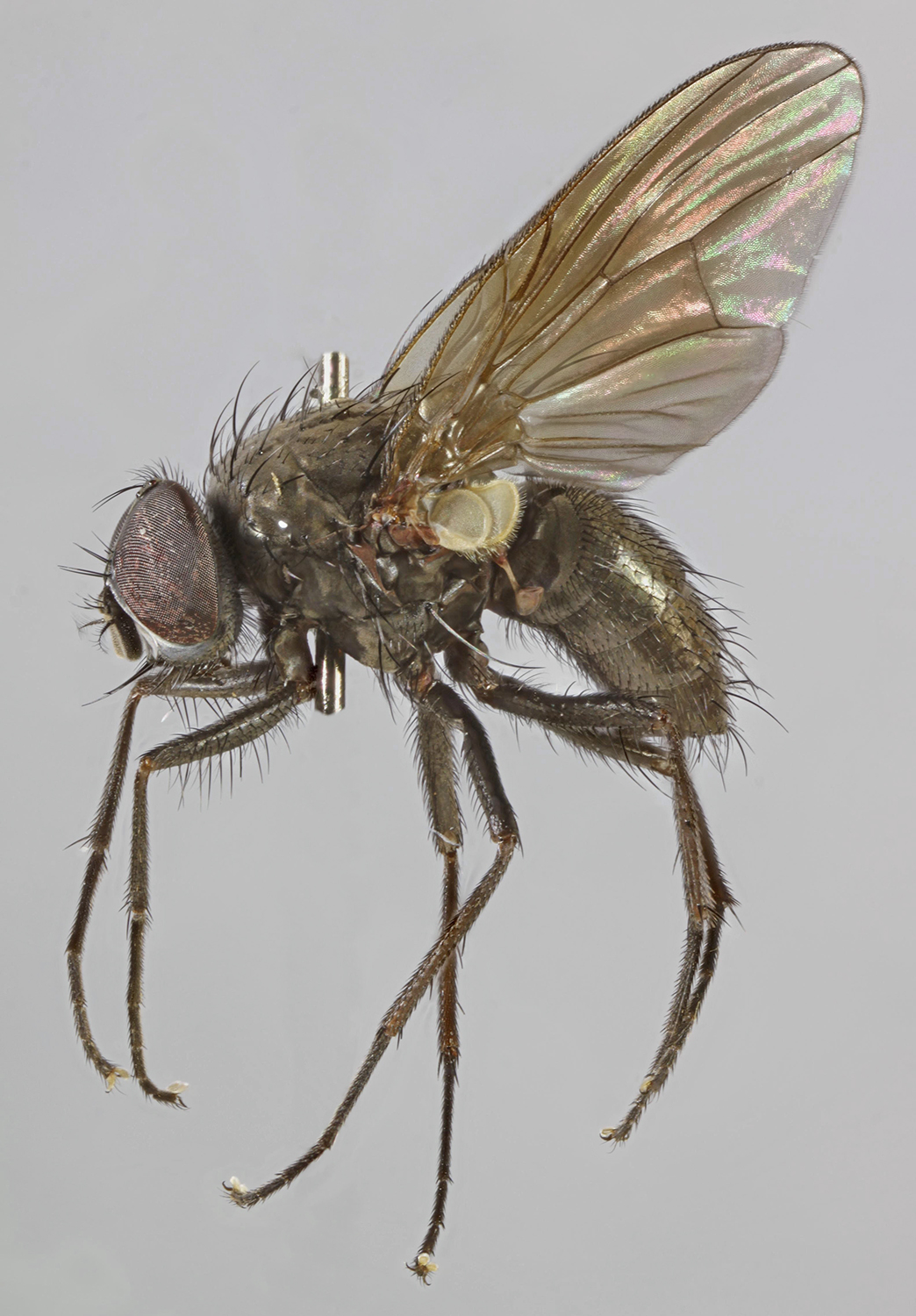

Scientific classification
- Kingdom: Animalia
- Phylum: Arthropoda
- Clade: Pancrustacea
- Class: Insecta
- Order: Diptera
- Family: Muscidae
- Genus: Hebecnema
- Species: H. nigra

Binomial name
- Hebecnema nigra (Robineau-Desvoidy, 1830)

Synonyms
- Mydina nigra Robineau-Desvoidy, 1830

= Hebecnema nigra =

Species of fly

Hebecnema nigra is a fly from the family Muscidae. It is found in the Palearctic.
