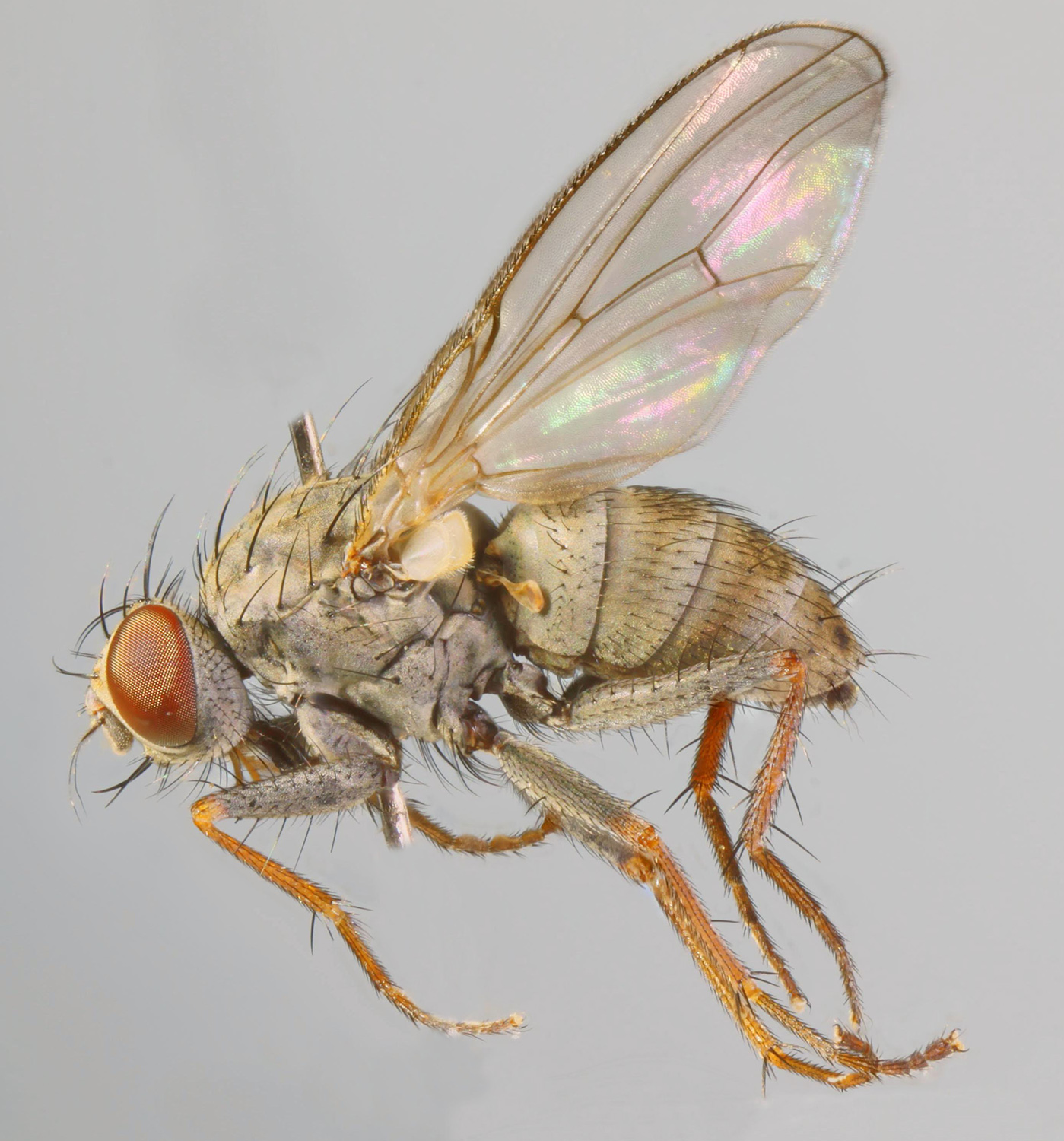
- Lispocephala erythrocera North Wales

Scientific classification
- Kingdom: Animalia
- Phylum: Arthropoda
- Clade: Pancrustacea
- Class: Insecta
- Order: Diptera
- Family: Muscidae
- Genus: Lispocephala
- Species: L. erythrocera

Binomial name
- Lispocephala erythrocera (Robineau-Desvoidy, 1830)

= Lispocephala erythrocera =

Species of fly

Lispocephala erythrocera is a fly from the family Muscidae. It is found in the Palearctic, and was first described by Jean-Baptiste Robineau-Desvoidy in 1830. The species is distributed most commonly in Finland, the United Kingdom, and Canada.
