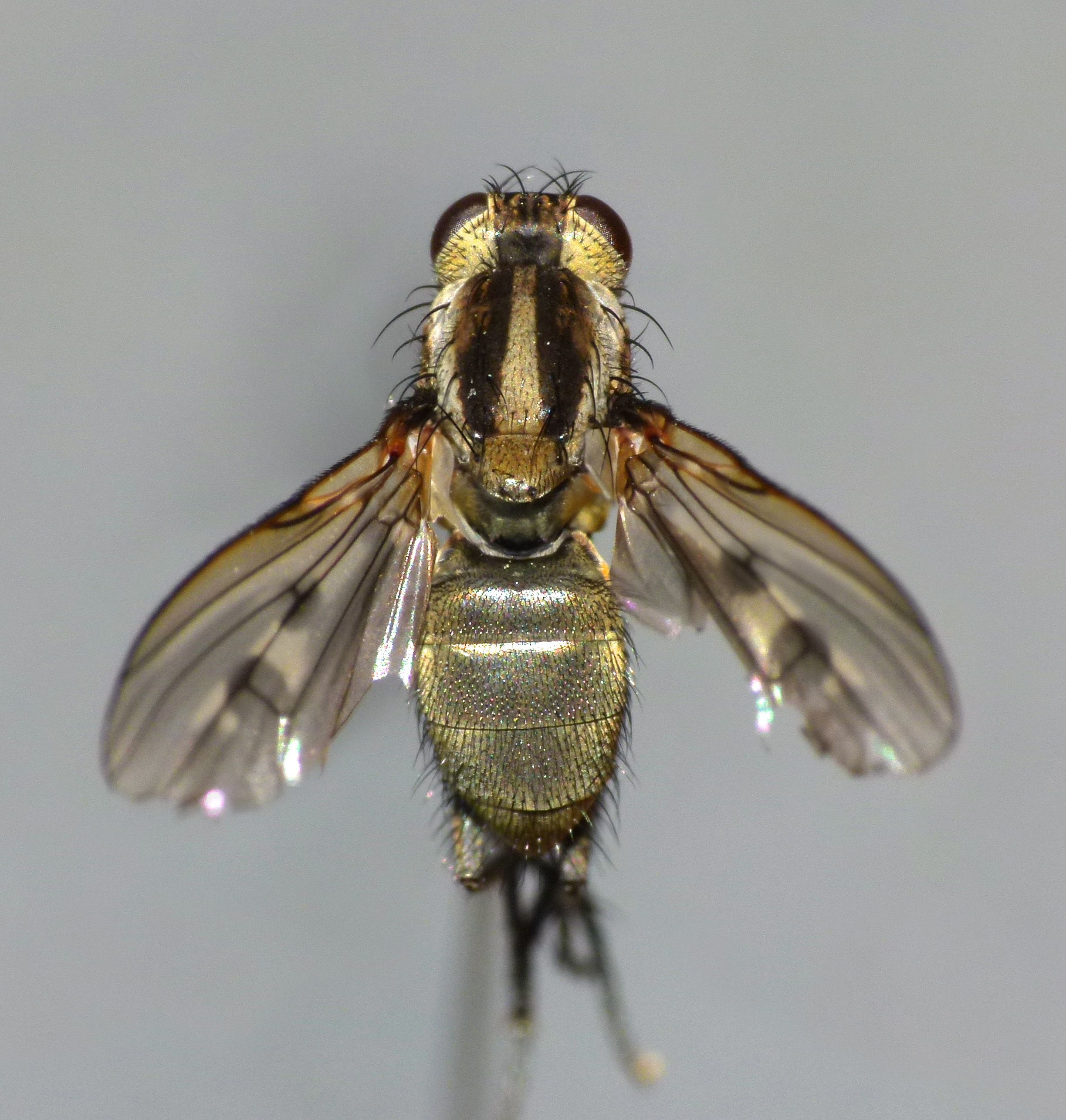
- Limnohelina bivittata from McPhees Rock / Loganburn Reservoir, Otago, NZ (dorsal view)
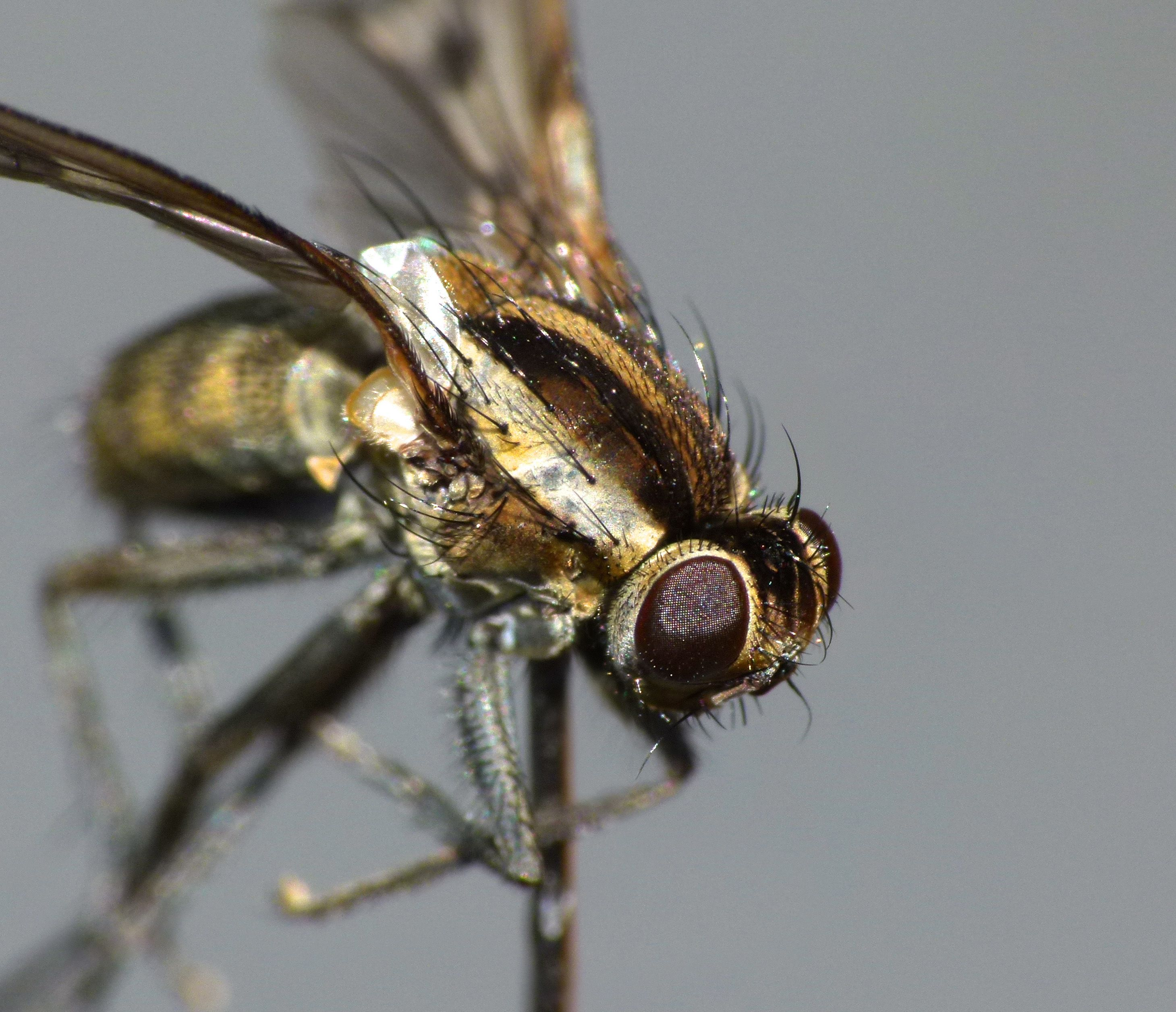
- Limnohelina bivittata from McPhees Rock / Loganburn Reservoir, Otago, NZ (lateral view)

Scientific classification
- Kingdom: Animalia
- Phylum: Arthropoda
- Clade: Pancrustacea
- Class: Insecta
- Order: Diptera
- Family: Muscidae
- Genus: Limnohelina
- Species: L. bivittata

Binomial name
- Limnohelina bivittata Malloch, 1931

= Limnohelina bivittata =

Species of fly

Limnohelina bivittata is a fly from the family Muscidae. It is found in New Zealand.

== Description ==
Malloch 1931 says, "This species is strikingly different from all the other NZ species in the group with four pairs of postsutural dorsocentral bristles, and two broad opaque black-brown vittae on the mesonotum which are divided by a paler central vitta. The lateral margins of mesonotum (are) densely greyish-white dusted. (The) upper third of frons velvety black and brown at anterior ocellus."
