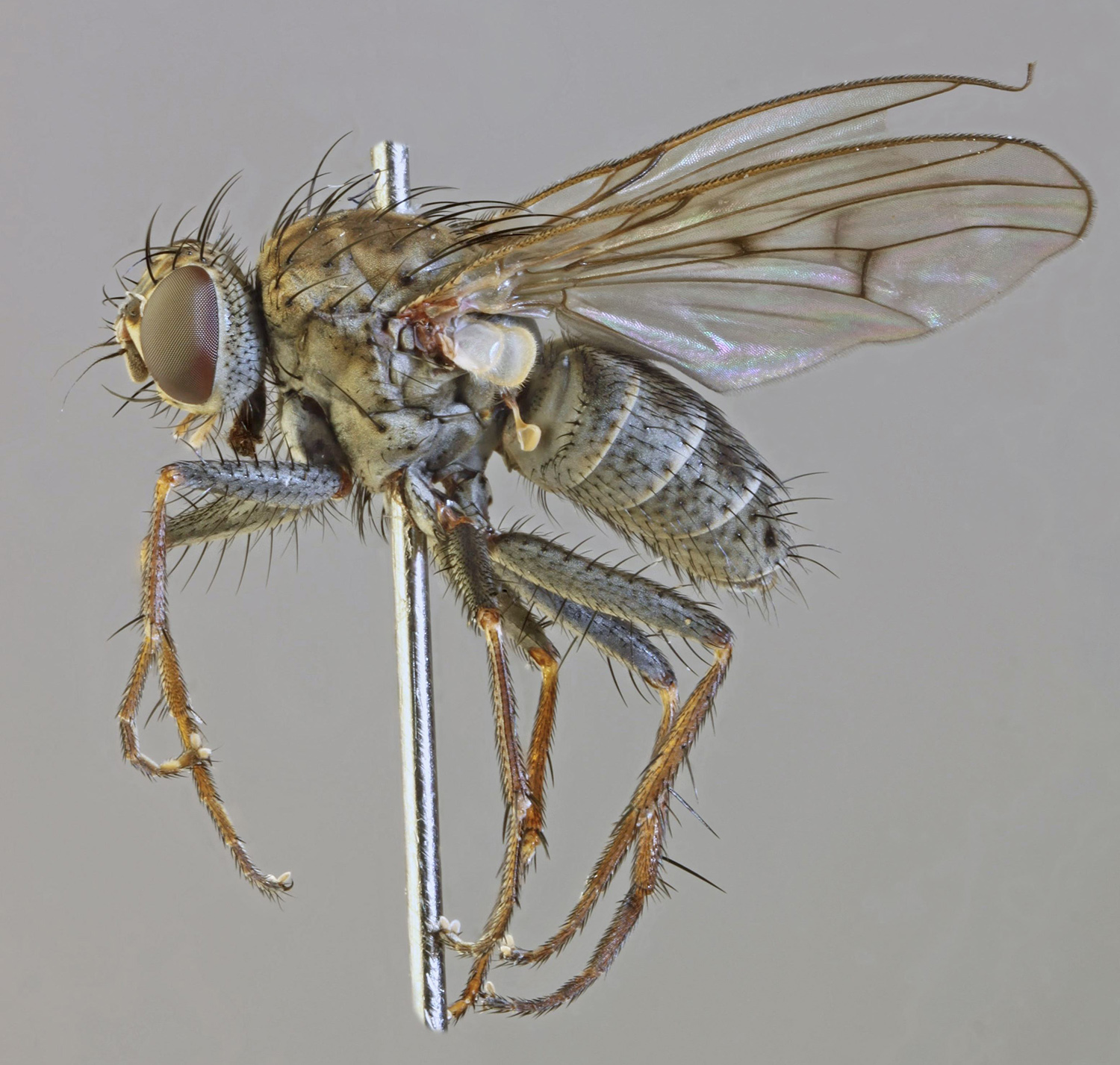
- Lispocephala alma female

Scientific classification
- Kingdom: Animalia
- Phylum: Arthropoda
- Clade: Pancrustacea
- Class: Insecta
- Order: Diptera
- Family: Muscidae
- Genus: Lispocephala
- Species: L. alma

Binomial name
- Lispocephala alma (Meigen, 1826)

Synonyms
- Anthomyia alma Meigen, 1826

= Lispocephala alma =

Species of fly

Lispocephala alma is a fly from the family Muscidae.

== Description ==
A small fly of 3.5 - 5mm, Head and body are mostly dark. Both basal segments of the antenna are reddish yellow. All femora are dark.

== Distribution ==
Holarctic, but common in Southern Europe. It could be more common than thought, as it is easily confused with other species.
