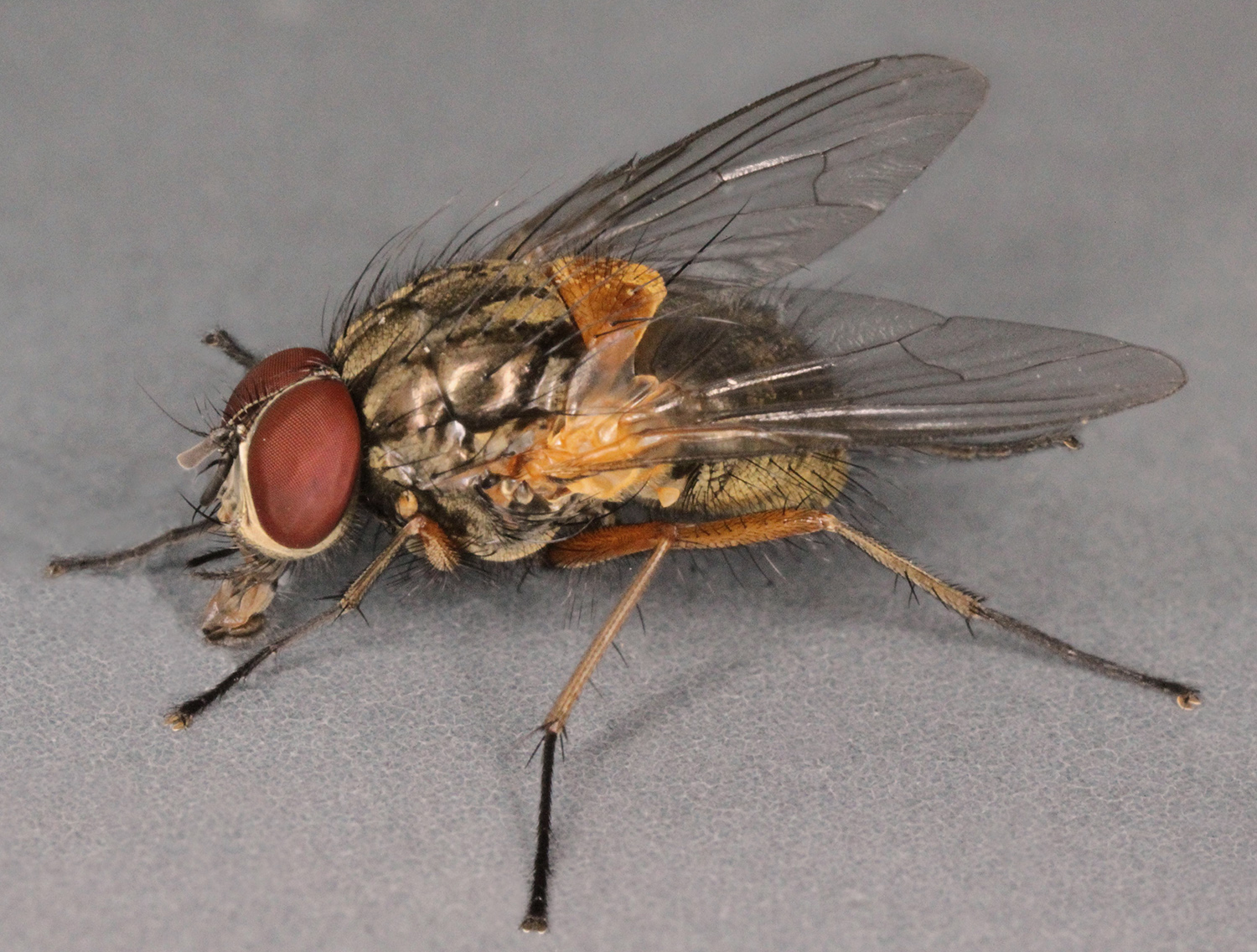
- Mydaea corni North Wales

Scientific classification
- Kingdom: Animalia
- Phylum: Arthropoda
- Clade: Pancrustacea
- Class: Insecta
- Order: Diptera
- Family: Muscidae
- Genus: Mydaea
- Species: M. corni

Binomial name
- Mydaea corni (Scopoli, 1763)

= Mydaea corni =

Species of fly

Mydaea corni is a fly from the family Muscidae. It is found in the Palearctic.
