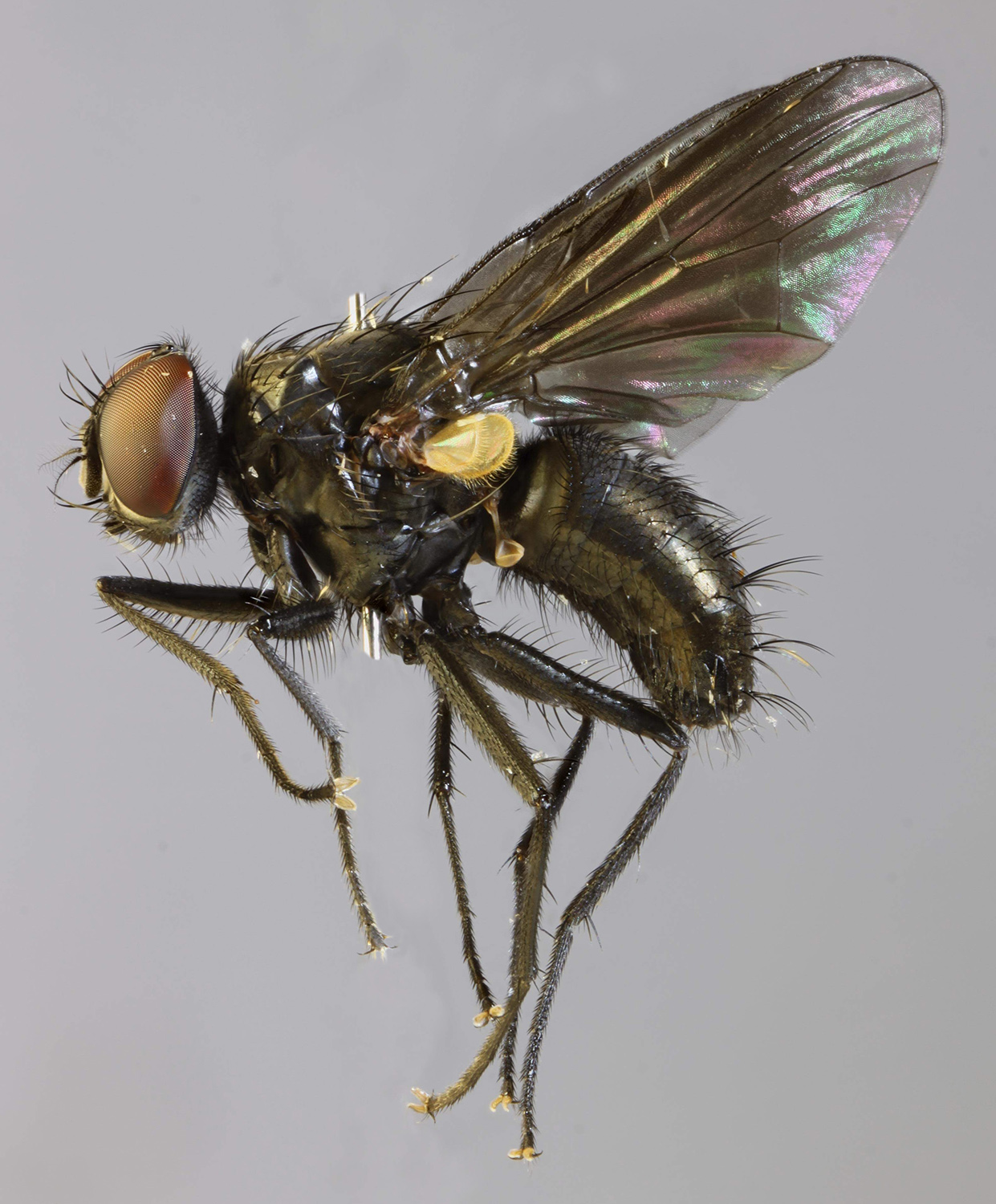
- Hebecnema vespertina North Wales

Scientific classification
- Kingdom: Animalia
- Phylum: Arthropoda
- Clade: Pancrustacea
- Class: Insecta
- Order: Diptera
- Family: Muscidae
- Genus: Hebecnema
- Species: H. vespertina

Binomial name
- Hebecnema vespertina (Fallén, 1823)

Synonyms
- Musca vespertina Fallén, 1823; Anthomyia dispar Stephens, 1829; Hebecnema affinis Malloch, 1921

= Hebecnema vespertina =

Species of fly

Hebecnema vespertina is a fly from the family Muscidae. It is found in the Palearctic.
