= Brontaea humilis =

Scientific classification
- Kingdom: Animalia
- Phylum: Arthropoda
- Clade: Pancrustacea
- Class: Insecta
- Order: Diptera
- Family: Muscidae
- Genus: Brontaea
- Species: B. humilis

Binomial name
- Brontaea humilis (Zetterstedt, 1860)

Synonyms
- Aricia humilis Zetterstedt, 1860

Species of fly

Brontaea humilis is a species of fly in the family Muscidae.
