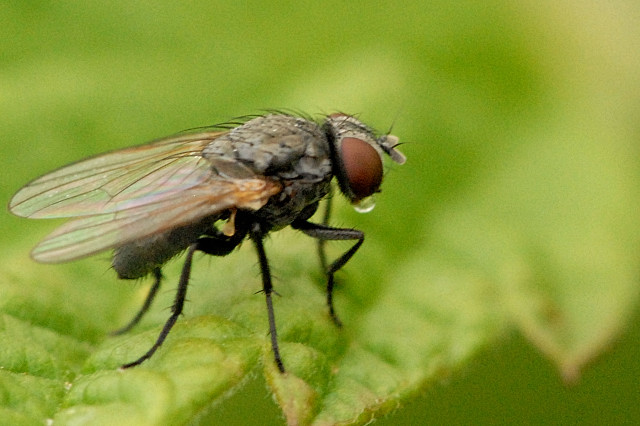
- Hebecnema umbratica

Scientific classification
- Kingdom: Animalia
- Phylum: Arthropoda
- Class: Insecta
- Order: Diptera
- Family: Muscidae
- Subfamily: Mydaeinae
- Genus: Hebecnema; Schnabl, 1889

Type species
- Anthomyia umbratica Meigen, 1826

Synonyms
- Graphomyia Agassiz, 1847

= Hebecnema =

Genus of flies

Hebecnema is a genus of true flies of the family Muscidae.

== Species ==
- Hebecnema anthracina Stein, 1908
- Hebecnema fulva (Bigot, 1885)
- Hebecnema fumosa (Meigen, 1826)
- Hebecnema nigra (Robineau-Desvoidy, 1830)
- Hebecnema nigricolor (Fallén, 1825)
- Hebecnema umbratica (Meigen, 1826)
- Hebecnema vespertina (Fallén, 1823)
