= Arthurella =

Scientific classification
- Kingdom: Animalia
- Phylum: Arthropoda
- Class: Insecta
- Order: Diptera
- Family: Muscidae
- Subfamily: Cyrtoneurininae
- Genus: Arthurella; Albuquerque, 1954

Genus of flies

Arthurella is a genus of flies in the family Muscidae.

== Selected species ==
- Arthurella choelensis Patitucci & Mariluis, 2011
- Arthurella nudiseta Albuquerque, 1954
