= Bryantina =

Scientific classification
- Domain: Eukaryota
- Kingdom: Animalia
- Phylum: Arthropoda
- Class: Insecta
- Order: Diptera
- Family: Muscidae
- Genus: Bryantina; Malloch, 1926
- Species: B. javensis

Binomial name
- Bryantina javensis Malloch, 1926

Genus of flies

Bryantina is a monotypic genus of flies belonging to the family Muscidae. The only species is Bryantina javensis.
