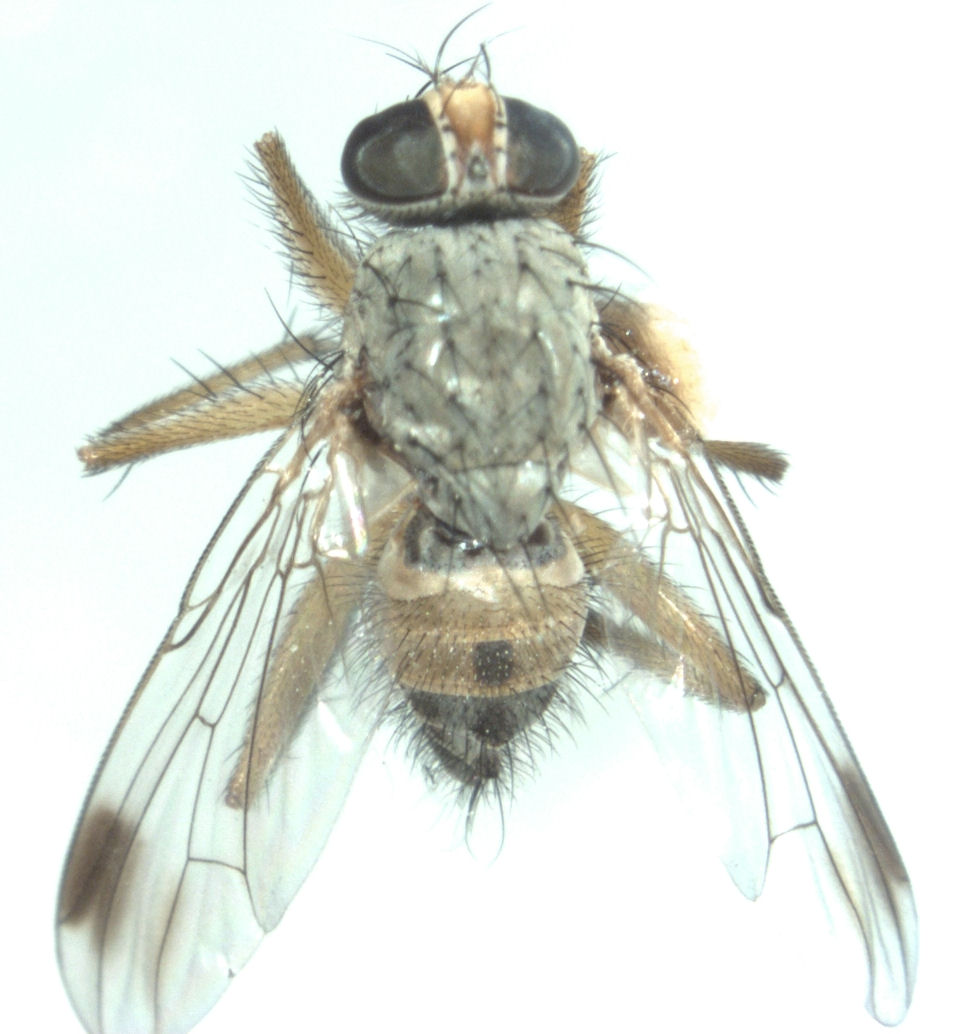
- Pygophora apicalis

Scientific classification
- Kingdom: Animalia
- Phylum: Arthropoda
- Class: Insecta
- Order: Diptera
- Family: Muscidae
- Genus: Pygophora; Schiner, 1868

Species
- See text

= Pygophora (fly) =

Genus of flies

Pygophora is a genus of flies belonging to the family Muscidae, comprising roughly 80 species as of 2023.

The species of this genus are found in Africa, Asia, Australia, New Zealand and the Pacific Islands.

== Description ==
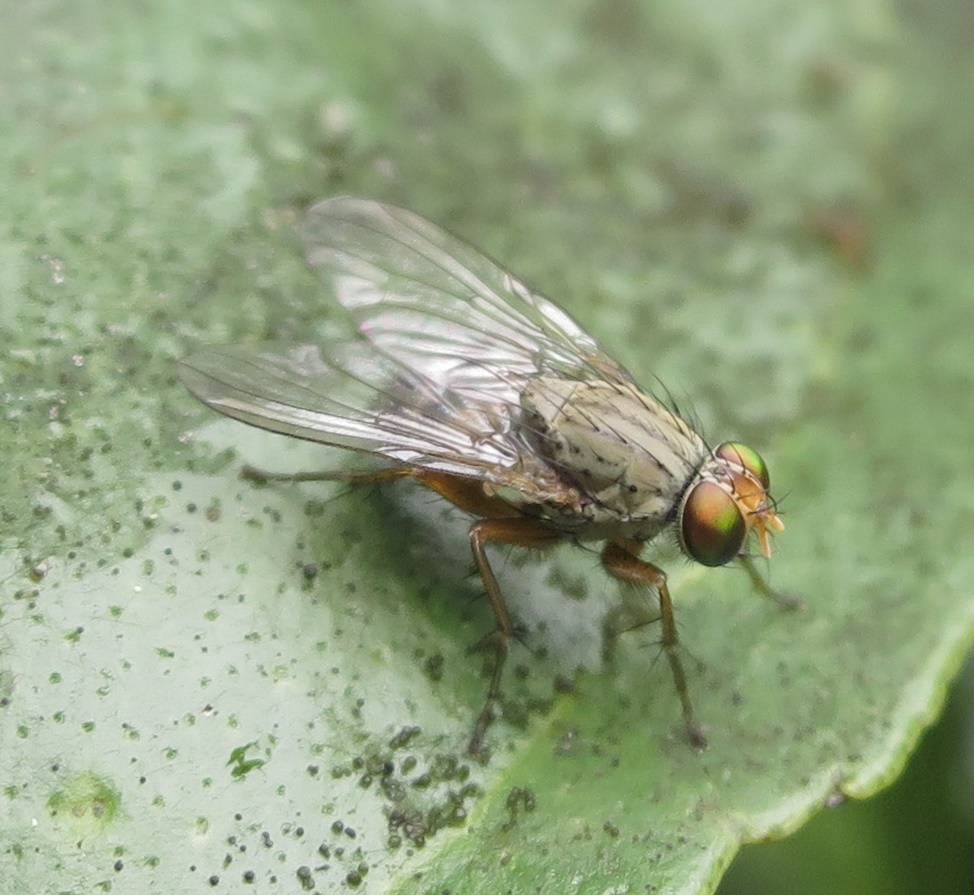
Pygophora apicalis, New Zealand

The head of adult Pygophora has the upper inclinate frontal setae inserted much closer to lower reclinate frontal setae than to lower inclinate frontal setae. The arista of the antennae is very plumose (hairy) on the basal half and bare on the apical half (rarely, the basal four-fifths are sparsely plumose. The ocellar setae are moderately developed and always distinct. On the thorax, the lowest sternopleural setae is much shorter and finer than either of the upper sternopleural setae. The fore tibia has a strong submedian postero-ventral seta.

The genus can be divided into two groups based on the number of preapical setae on the mid femur. Some species have only one preapical setae, and these occur in Asia and Africa while being unknown in New Guinea, Australia and the Pacific. Conversely, the species with two preapical setae occur mainly in Indonesia, New Guinea, Australia and the western Pacific, with few species in mainland Asia and none in mainland Asia.

== Ecology ==
Pygophora, like some other members of subfamily Coenosiinae, are predators. Their known prey include other flies in the families Psychodidae (moth flies), Culicidae (mosquitoes), Chironomidae (non-biting midges) and Mycetophilidae (fungus gnats).

== Species ==
The genus Pygophora includes the following species:

- Pygophora absentiseta Crosskey, 1962
- Pygophora acromiata (Speiser, 1910)
- Pygophora africana Crosskey, 1962
- Pygophora apicalis
