= Atherigoninae =

Scientific classification
- Kingdom: Animalia
- Phylum: Arthropoda
- Clade: Pancrustacea
- Class: Insecta
- Order: Diptera
- Family: Muscidae
- Subfamily: Atherigoninae; Fan, 1965

Group of flies

Atherigoninae is a subfamily of insects within the Diptera family Muscidae.

== Genera ==
- Achanthiptera Rondani, 1856
- Atherigona Rondani, 1856
