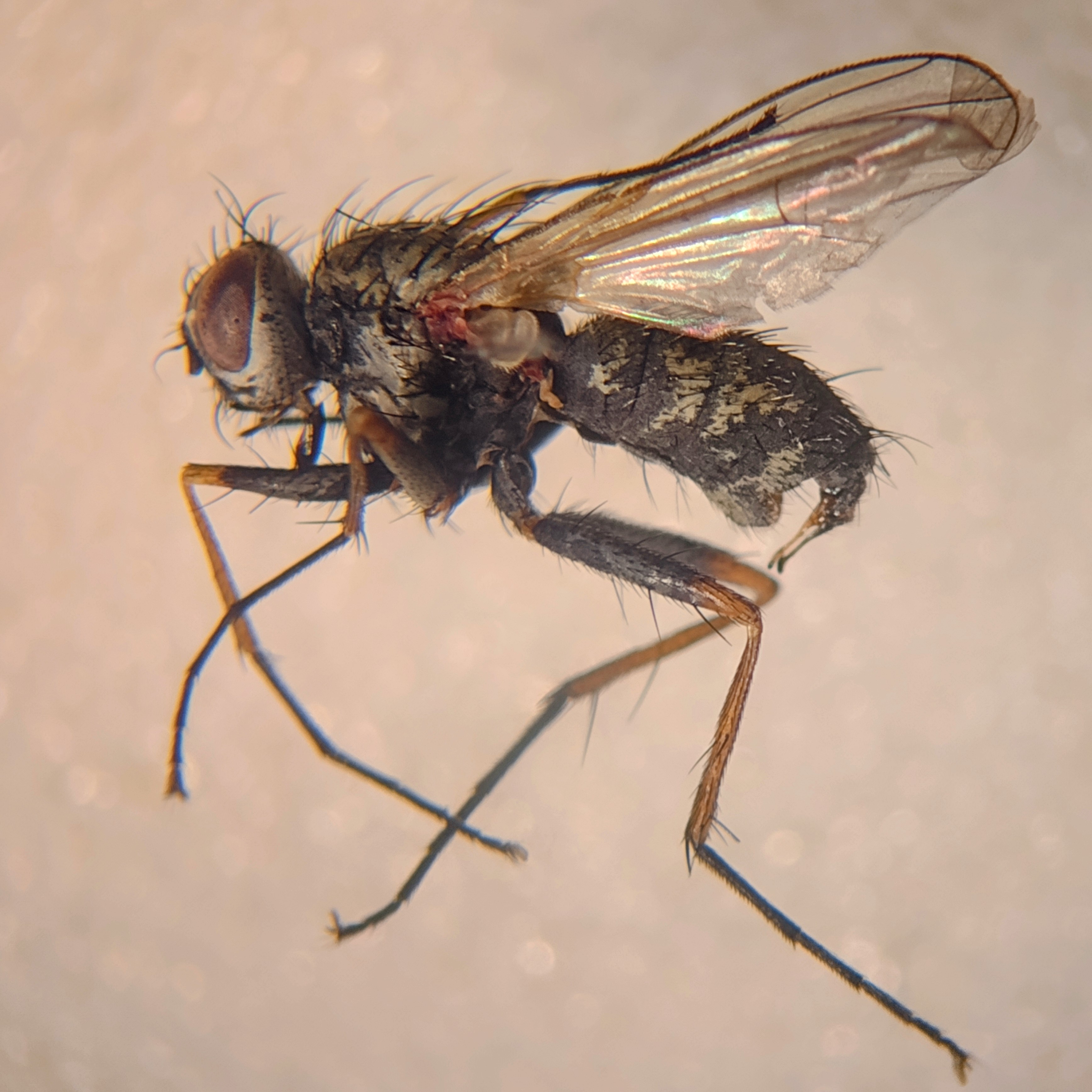
- Macrorchis meditata

Scientific classification
- Kingdom: Animalia
- Phylum: Arthropoda
- Class: Insecta
- Order: Diptera
- Family: Muscidae
- Genus: Macrorchis; Rondani, 1877

Synonyms
- Machorchis Meade, 1883

= Macrorchis =

Genus of flies

Macrorchis is a genus of flies belonging to the family Muscidae.

The species of this genus are found in Europe and North America.

== Species ==
The following species are recognised in the genus Macrorchis:

- Macrorchis alone (Walker, 1849)
- Macrorchis ausoba (Walker, 1849)
- Macrorchis majuscula (Coquillett, 1904)
- Macrorchis meditata (Fallén, 1825)
