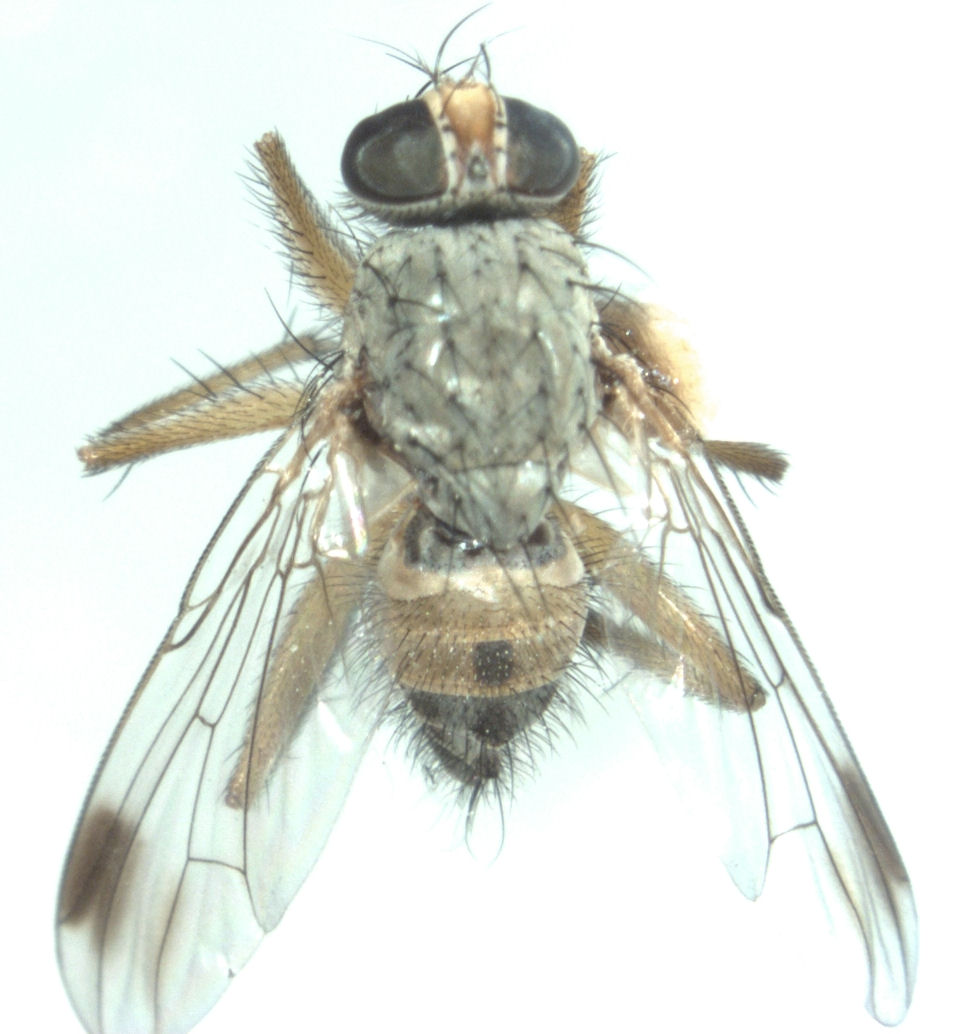
- Male

Scientific classification
- Kingdom: Animalia
- Phylum: Arthropoda
- Class: Insecta
- Order: Diptera
- Family: Muscidae
- Genus: Pygophora
- Species: P. apicalis

Binomial name
- Pygophora apicalis Schiner, 1868

= Pygophora apicalis =

Species of fly in family Muscidae

Pygophora apicalis is a species of fly in the family Muscidae and subfamily Coenosiinae. It is native to Australia and has been introduced to New Zealand.

== Description ==
Adult males are 5.6-6.0 mm long. The eyes are iridescent green in living flies. The thorax is grey and has black bristles. The abdomen is yellow with a dark grey pattern, and the third and fourth visible tergites have three black spots each. The fourth visible tergite has a pinched dorsal edge. The ventral surface of the body is yellow, as are the legs and antennae. The tibiae of the hind legs have modified tips, each tibia having a small ventral lobe bearing a few short and stout setae. The wings are clear and each one usually has a dark patch near its apex.

Females are slightly larger than males at 6.1–6.5 mm long. They are overall similar to males, but the mesonotum is more yellowish, the wings never have dark patches, the fourth abdominal tergite does not have a pinched dorsal edge, and the hind tibia is unmodified.

== Ecology ==
Pygophora apicalis have been found in fruit fly (Tephritidae) surveillance traps, on vegetation, in buildings and in cars.

The adults are presumably predators, based on knowledge from other species of Pygophora. The larvae are unknown. Based on larvae of other Coenosiini, they may live in soil and prey on small invertebrates.

== Gallery ==
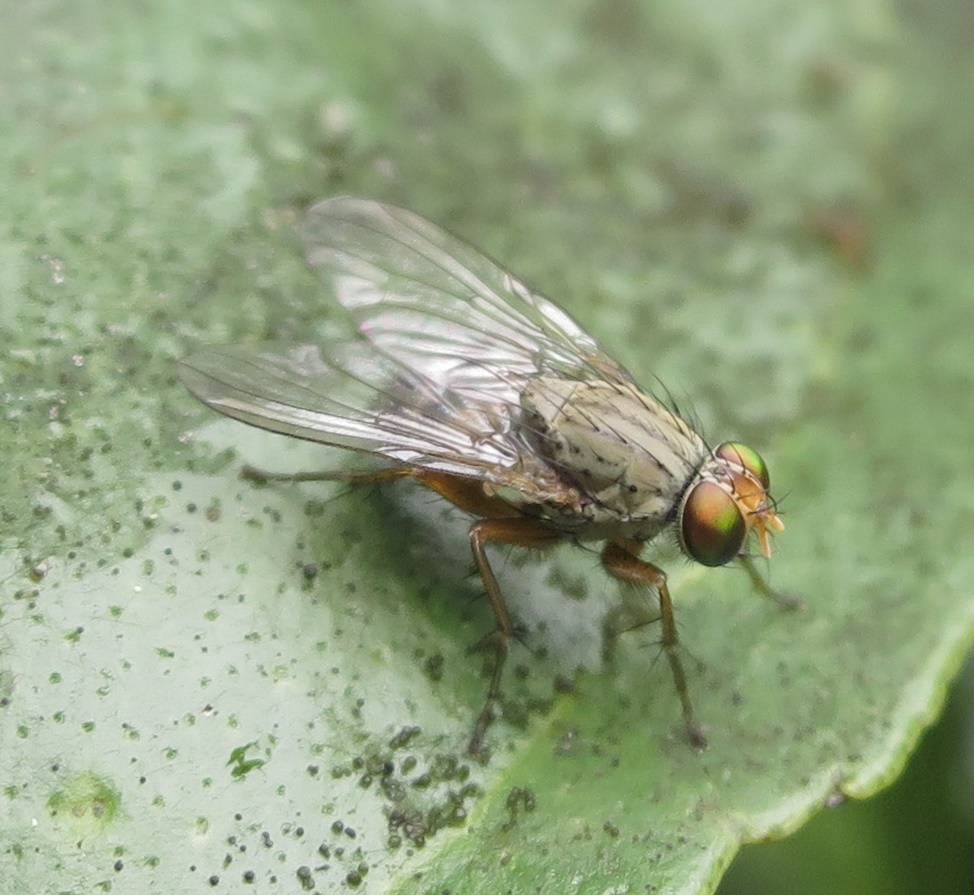
On leaf
