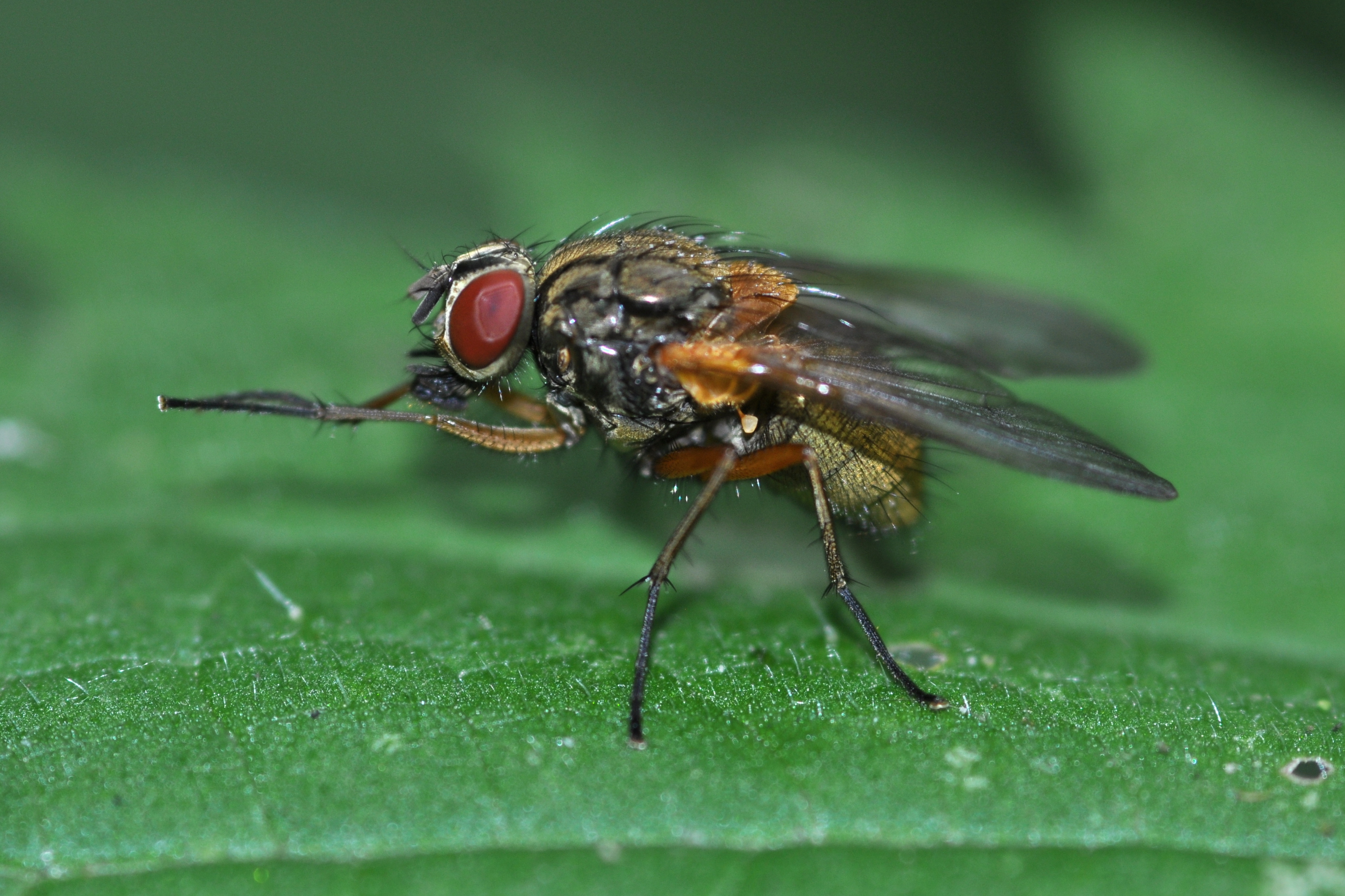
- Mydaea ancilla

Scientific classification
- Kingdom: Animalia
- Phylum: Arthropoda
- Clade: Pancrustacea
- Class: Insecta
- Order: Diptera
- Family: Muscidae
- Subfamily: Mydaeinae
- Genus: Mydaea; Robineau-Desvoidy, 1830

= Mydaea =

Genus of flies

Mydaea is a large genus from the fly family Muscidae.

== Species ==
- M. affinis Meade, 1891
- M. ancilla (Meigen, 1826)
- M. anicula (Zetterstedt, 1860)
- M. armatipes Malloch, 1921
- M. brevipilosa Malloch, 1920
- M. canescens Huckett, 1965
- M. corni (Scopoli, 1763)
- M. cresa Snyder, 1949
- M. deserta (Zetterstedt, 1845)
- M. discimanoides Snyder, 1949
- M. electa (Zetterstedt, 1860)
- M. flavicornis Coquillett, 1902
- M. fulvicrura (Huckett, 1965)
- M. fumipennis (Wulp, 1896)
- M. furtiva Stein, 1920
- M. fuscomarginata (Malloch, 1919)
- M. grata Huckett, 1973
- M. hirtiventris Malloch, 1920
- M. humeralis Robineau-Desvoidy, 1830
- M. impedita Stein, 1920
- M. insons (Giglio-tos, 1893)
- M. laevis (Huckett, 1965)
- M. lateritia (Rondani, 1866)
- M. longuseta (Wulp, 1896)
- M. maculipennis (Huckett, 1966)
- M. maculiventris (Zetterstedt, 1846)
- M. micans Ringdahl, 1936
- M. narona Snyder, 1949
- M. nebulosa (Stein, 1893)
- M. neglecta Malloch, 1920
- M. neobscura Snyder, 1949
- M. nitidiventris (Ringdahl, 1934)
- M. nubila Stein, 1916
- M. nudiseta Stein, 1920
- M. obscurella Malloch, 1921
- M. occidentalis Malloch, 1920
- M. orthonevra (Macquart, 1835)
- M. otiosa Stein, 1920
- M. palpalis Stein, 1916
- M. pansa (Giglio-tos, 1893)
- M. plaumanni Snyder, 1941
- M. pogonoides (Snyder, 1949)
- M. pseudonubila Huckett, 1965
- M. rufinervis (Pokorny, 1889)
- M. setifemur Ringdahl, 1924
- M. setitibia (Huckett, 1965)
- M. sootryeni Ringdahl, 1928
- M. urbana (Meigen, 1826)
- M. winnemana Malloch, 1919
