= Caricea =

Scientific classification
- Domain: Eukaryota
- Kingdom: Animalia
- Phylum: Arthropoda
- Class: Insecta
- Order: Diptera
- Family: Muscidae
- Tribe: Coenosiini
- Genus: Caricea

Genus of flies

Caricea is a genus of house flies, in the family Muscidae. There are at least 30 described species in Caricea.

== Species ==
- Caricea acerca Xue, 1991
- Caricea acuticauda (Huckett, 1966)
- Caricea aemulata (Huckett, 1973)
- Caricea alma (Meigen, 1826)
- Caricea bistriata Stein, 1908
- Caricea brachialis (Rondani, 1877)
- Caricea brevitarsis (Malloch, 1935)
- Caricea curvivesica Xue, Feng & Liu, 1998
- Caricea eludens (Huckett, 1965)
- Caricea erythrocera Robineau-desvoidy, 1830
- Caricea falculata (Collin, 1963)
- Caricea frigida Feng & Xue, 1997
- Caricea fuscitibia (Ringdahl, 1944)
- Caricea iyoensis Shinonaga, 2003
- Caricea japonica Shinonaga, 2003
- Caricea kanoi Shinonaga, 2003
- Caricea montana (Hennig, 1961)
- Caricea nearctica (Huckett, 1965)
- Caricea obfuscatipennis Xue, 1998
- Caricea okinawensis Shinonaga, 2003
- Caricea orbiprotuberans Xue & Yang, 1998
- Caricea pallipalpis (Zetterstedt, 1845)
- Caricea paulihamata Xue, Feng & Liu, 1998
- Caricea postifolifera Feng & Xue, 1997
- Caricea rubricornis (Zetterstedt, 1849)
- Caricea securisocialis Xue, Feng & Liu, 1998
- Caricea setipes (Malloch, 1935)
- Caricea spuria (Zetterstedt, 1838)
- Caricea tinctinervis (Malloch, 1935)
- Caricea ungulata (Rondani, 1866)
- Caricea ungulitigris Feng & Xue, 1997
- Caricea unicolor Stein, 1907
- Caricea varians (Malloch, 1935)
- Caricea verna (Fabricius, 1794)
- Caricea vernalis Stein, 1907
- Caricea xanthogaster Shinonaga, 2003
- Caricea yakushimensis Shinonaga, 2003
