= Cyrtoneurininae =

Scientific classification
- Kingdom: Animalia
- Phylum: Arthropoda
- Clade: Pancrustacea
- Class: Insecta
- Order: Diptera
- Family: Muscidae
- Subfamily: Cyrtoneurininae; Snyder, 1954

Subfamily of flies

The Cyrtoneurininae are a subfamily within the Diptera family Muscidae.

== Genera ==
- Arthurella Albuquerque, 1954
- Cariocamyia Snyder, 1951
- Charadrella Wulp, 1896
- Chortinus Aldrich, 1932
- Cyrtoneurina Giglio-Tos, 1983
- Cyrtoneuropsis Malloch, 1925
- Mulfordia Malloch, 1928
- Neomuscina Townsend, 1919
- Neomusciniopsis Albuquerque & Lopes
- Neurotrixa Shannon & Del Ponte, 1926
- Polietina Schnabl & Dziedzicki, 1911
- Pseudoptilolepis Snyder, 1949
