= Magma (fly) =

Scientific classification
- Domain: Eukaryota
- Kingdom: Animalia
- Phylum: Arthropoda
- Class: Insecta
- Order: Diptera
- Family: Muscidae
- Genus: Magma; Albuquerque, 1949

Genus of flies

Magma is a genus of house flies in the family Muscidae. There is at least one described species in Magma, M. opportunum.
