= Pygophora (crustacean) =

Family of crustaceans

Pygophora is a family of barnacles. It was formerly considered an order until Chan et al. (2021) reduced orders Pygophora and Apygophora to families within the order Lithoglyptida.
