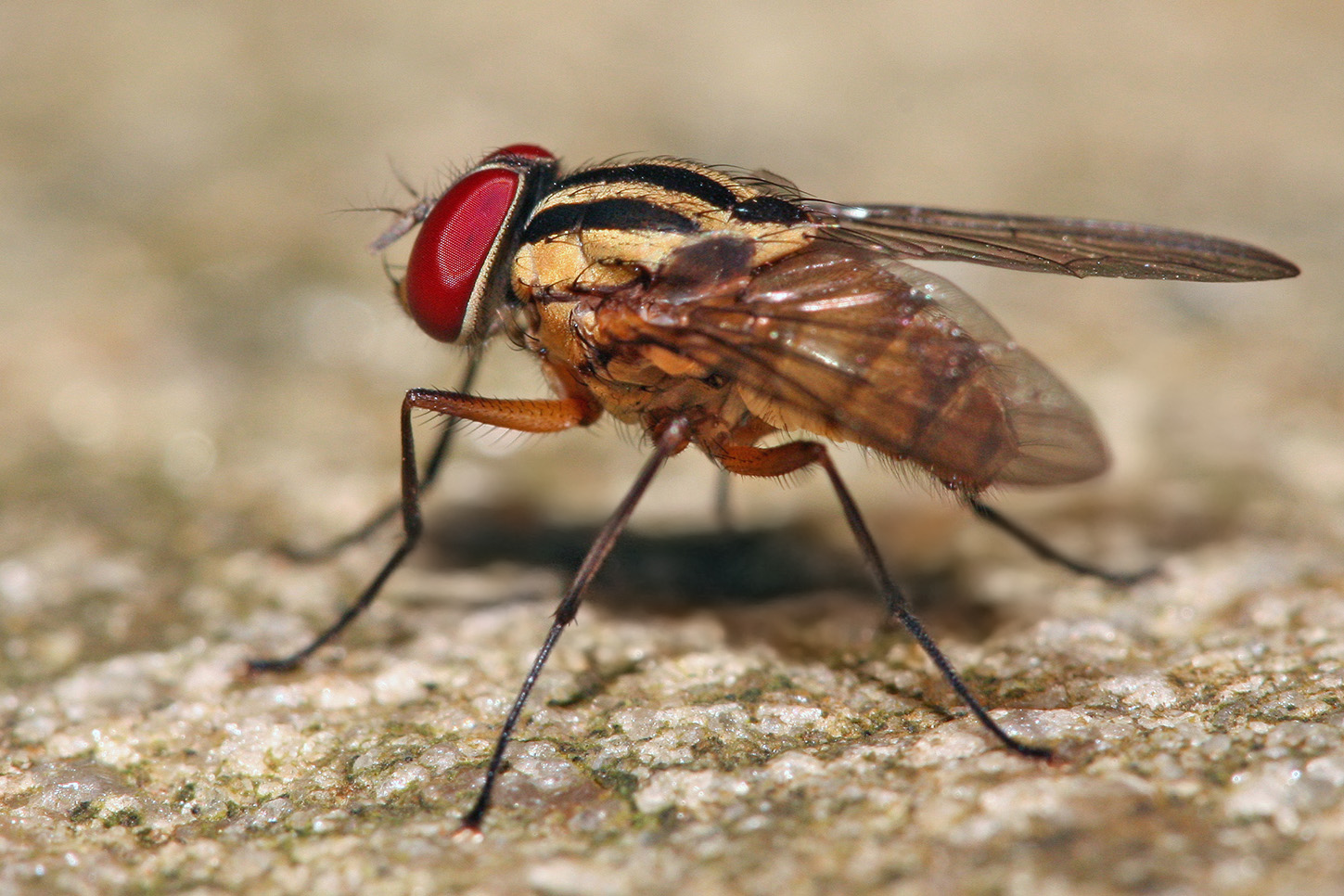

Scientific classification
- Kingdom: Animalia
- Phylum: Arthropoda
- Clade: Pancrustacea
- Class: Insecta
- Order: Diptera
- Family: Muscidae
- Genus: Graphomya
- Species: G. eustolia

Binomial name
- Graphomya eustolia (Walker, 1849)

Synonyms
- Musca eustolia Walker, 1849; Graphomuscina africana Townsend, 1918; Spilogaster trivittata Stein, 1906

= Graphomya eustolia =

Species of fly

Graphomya eustolia is a species of fly from the family Muscidae. It occurs in Southern Africa.
