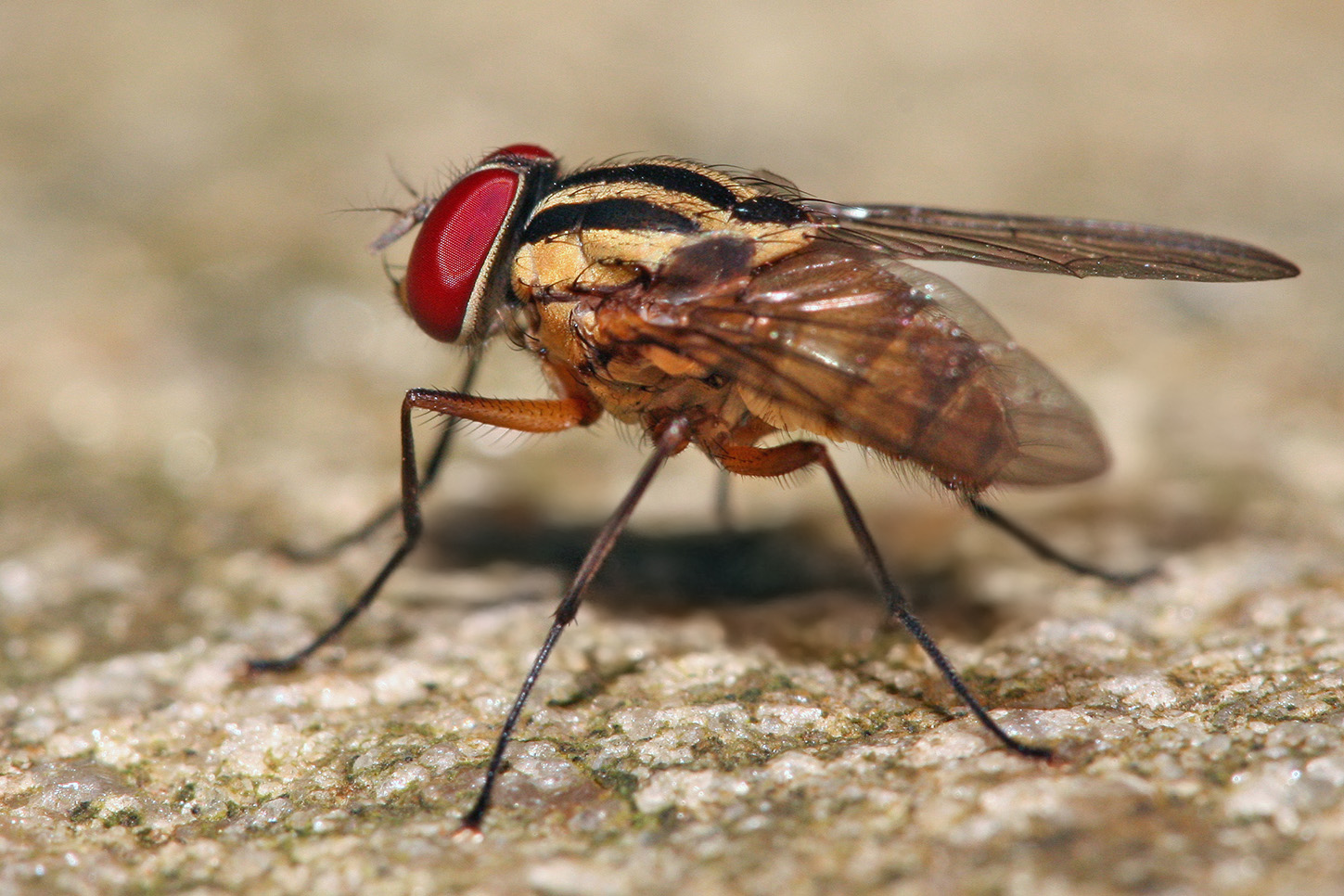
- Graphomya eustolia

Scientific classification
- Kingdom: Animalia
- Phylum: Arthropoda
- Class: Insecta
- Order: Diptera
- Family: Muscidae
- Genus: Graphomya; Robineau-Desvoidy, 1830

Type species
- Musca maculata Scopoli, 1763

Synonyms
- Graphomyia Agassiz, 1847

= Graphomya =

Genus of flies

Graphomya is a genus of true flies of the family Muscidae.

== Species ==
- G. alaskensis Arntfield, 1975
- G. americana Robineau-Desvoidy, 1830
- G. columbiana Arntfield, 1975
- G. eustolia Walker, 1849
- G. idessa (Walker, 1849)
- G. interior Arntfield, 1975
- G. maculata (Scopoli, 1763)
- G. minor Robineau-Desvoidy, 1830
- G. minuta Arntfield, 1975
- G. occidentalis Arntfield, 1975
- G. transitionis Arntfield, 1975
- G. ungava Arntfield, 1975
