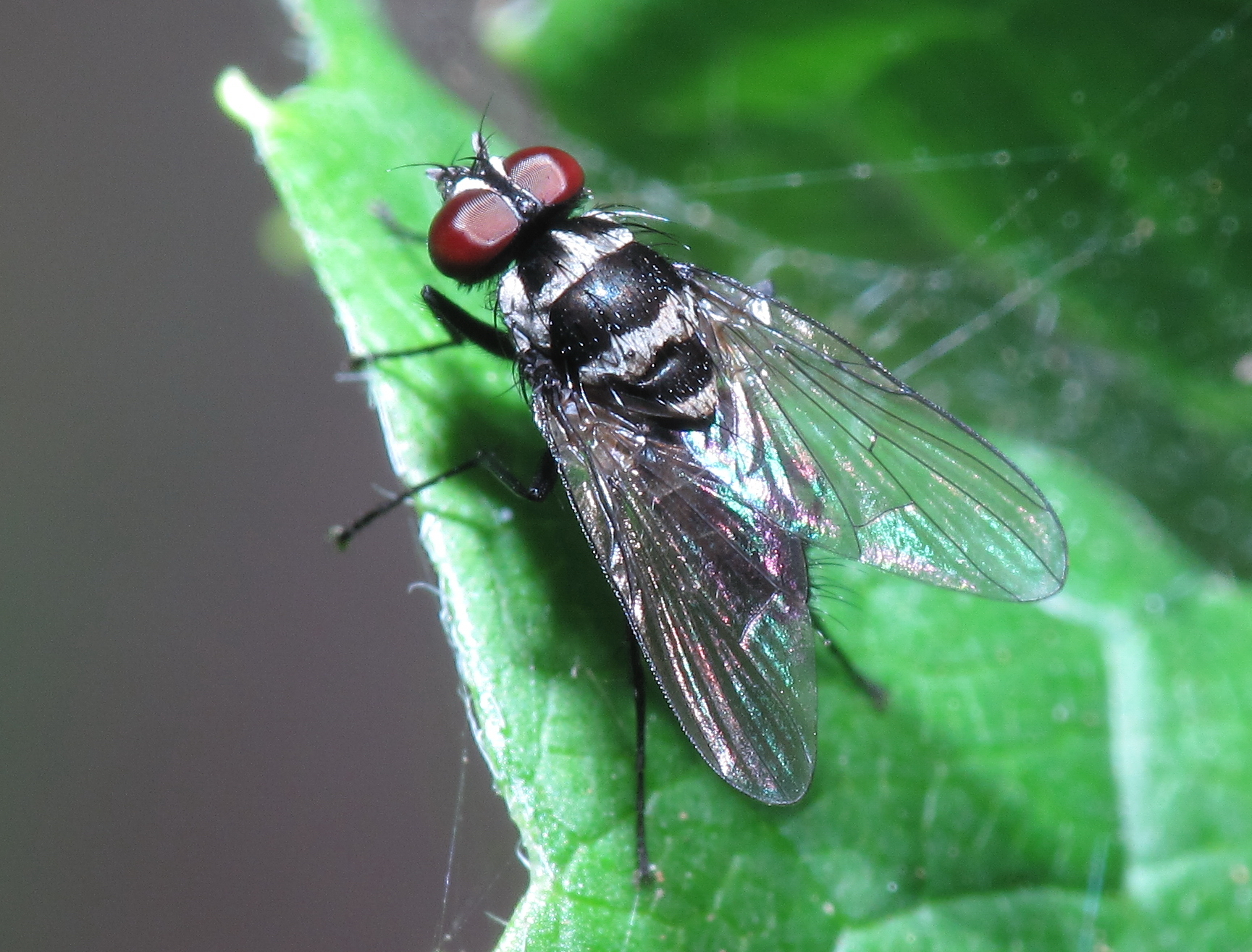
- Limnophora tigrina (Limnophorini)

Scientific classification
- Kingdom: Animalia
- Phylum: Arthropoda
- Clade: Pancrustacea
- Class: Insecta
- Order: Diptera
- Family: Muscidae
- Subfamily: Coenosiinae; Verrall, 1888

Tribes
- Coenosiini; Limnophorini

= Coenosiinae =

Subfamily of flies

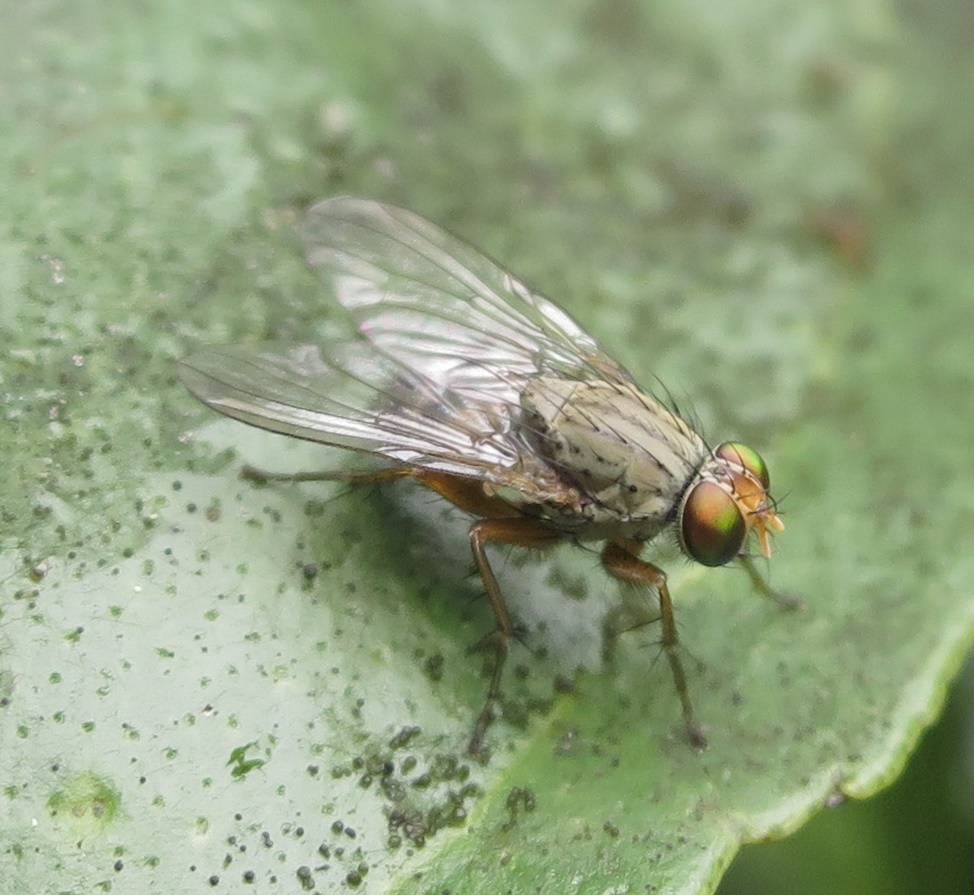
Pygophora apicalis (Coenosiini)

The Coenosiinae are a subfamily of true flies, belonging to the family Muscidae.
