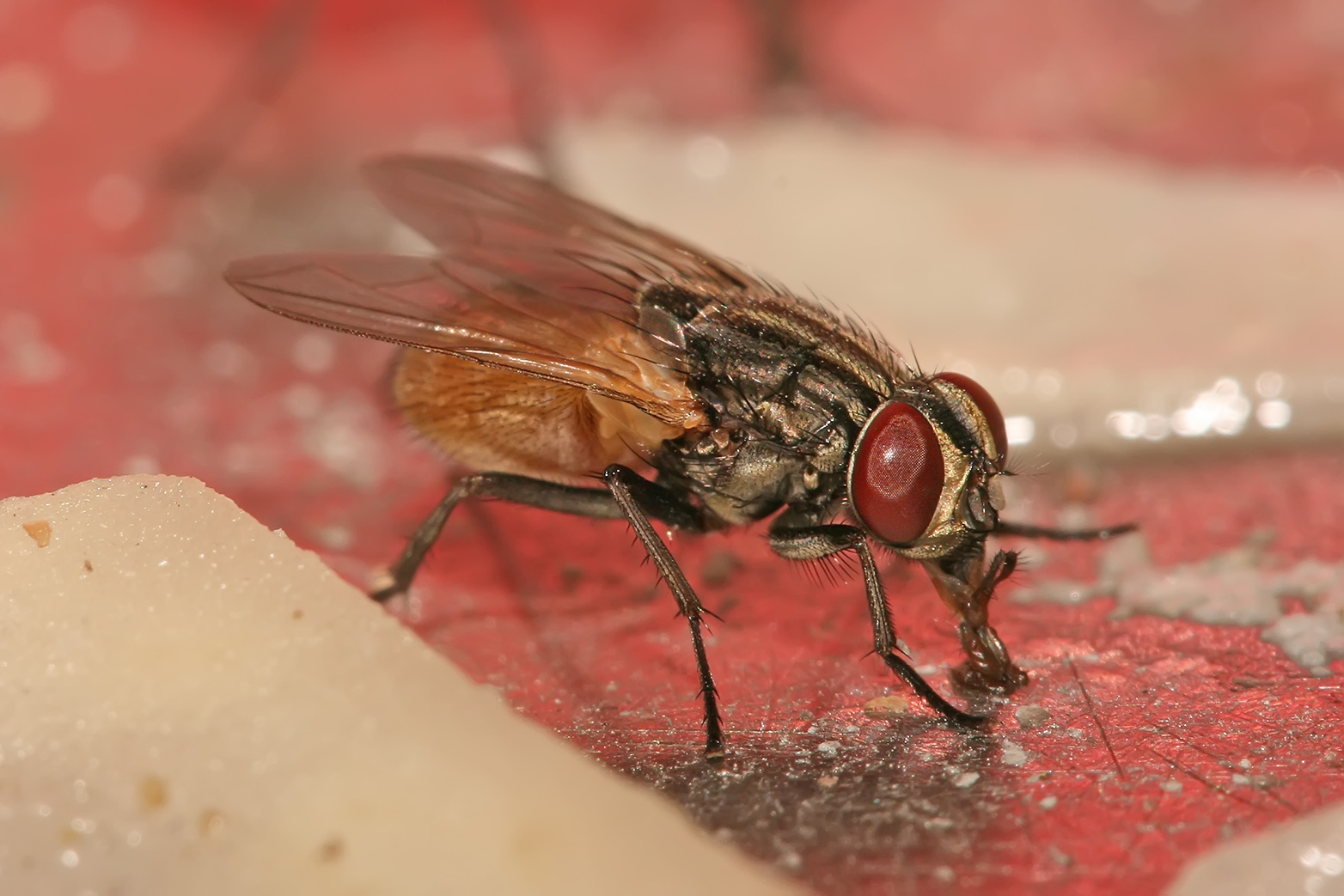
- Musca domestica

Scientific classification
- Kingdom: Animalia
- Phylum: Arthropoda
- Clade: Pancrustacea
- Class: Insecta
- Order: Diptera
- Clade: Eremoneura
- Clade: Cyclorrhapha
- Section: Schizophora
- Subsection: Calyptratae
- Superfamily: Muscoidea
- Family: Muscidae; Latreille, 1802

Subfamilies
- Atherigoninae; Azeliinae; Coenosiinae; Cyrtoneurininae; Muscinae; Mydaeinae; Phaoniinae

= Muscidae =

Family of flies

Muscidae are a family of flies found in the superfamily Muscoidea.

Muscidae, some of which are commonly known as house flies or stable flies due to their synanthropy, are worldwide in distribution and contain almost 4,000 described species in over 100 genera.

Most species are not synanthropic. Adults can be predatory, hematophagous, saprophagous, or feed on a number of types of plant and animal exudates. They can be attracted to various substances including sugar, sweat, tears and blood. Larvae occur in various habitats including decaying vegetation, dry and wet soil, nests of insects and birds, fresh water, and carrion.

The housefly, Musca domestica, is the best known and most important species.

Some, from the genera Hydrotaea and Muscina, are involved in forensic case studies.

== Identifying characteristics ==
The antennae are three-segmented and aristate; vein Rs is two-branched, a frontal suture is present, and the calypters are well developed. The arista is often plumose for the entire length. The hypopleuron is usually without bristles; generally, more than one sternopleural bristle is present. The R5 cell is either parallel-sided or narrowed distally. Vein 2A is short and does not reach the wing margin.

The Fanniidae, which used to be a subfamily (Fanniinae) of the Muscidae, share these characters, but may be separated from them by the absence of the identifying characteristics for the family Fanniidae.

== Biology ==
Larvae mainly develop in decaying plant material or manure.

== Health and economic importance ==
Adults of many species are passive vectors of pathogens for diseases such as typhoid fever, dysentery, anthrax, and African sleeping sickness.

Larvae of some Atherigona species are important pests in cultivation of cereals, like rice and maize.

== Evolution ==
Seven species in six described genera have been recorded from the fossil record. Lambrecht (1980: 369) estimated that the family Muscidae originated as long ago as the Permian, although no fossil record exists for the family any older than the Eocene.

== Genera ==
List of genera according to the Catalogue of Life:

- Adia
- Aethiopomyia
- Afromydaea
- Agenamyia
- Albertinella
- Alluaudinella
- Altimyia
- Amicitia
- Anaphalantus
- Andersonosia
- Anthocoenosia
- Apsil
- Arthurella
- Atelia
- Atherigona
- Auria
- Azelia
- Balioglutum
- Beccimyia
- Biopyrellia
- Bithoracochaeta
- Brachygasterina
- Brevicosta
- Bruceomyia
- Bryantina
- Buccophaonia
- Calliphoroides
- Camptotarsopoda
- Caricea
- Cariocamyia
- Cephalispa
- Chaetagenia
- Chaetopapuaia
- Chaetophaonia
- Charadrella
- Chortinus
- Coenosia
- Cordilura
- Cordiluroides
- Correntosia
- Crucianella
- Curranosia
- Cypselodopteryx
- Cyrtoneurina
- Dasyphora
- Deltotus
- Dichaetomyia
- Dimorphia
- Dolichophaonia
- Drepanocnemis
- Drymeia
- Eginia
- Eginiella
- Eudasyphora
- Exsul
- Fraserella
- Graphomya
- Gymnodia
- Gymnopapuaia
- Haematobia
- Haematobosca
- Haematostoma
- Haroldopsis
- Hebecnema
- Helina
- Helinomydaea
- Heliographa
- Hemichlora
- Hennigiola
- Hennigmyia
- Huckettomyia
- Hydrotaea
- Idiohelina
- Insulamyia
- Itatingamyia
- Lasiopelta
- Limnohelina
- Limnophora
- Limnospila
- Lispacoenosia
- Lispe
- Lispocephala
- Lispoides
- Lophosceles
- Macroeginia
- Macrorchis
- Magma
- Megophyra
- Mesembrina
- Metopomyia
- Microcalyptra
- Mitroplatia
- Morellia
- Mulfordia
- Musca
- Muscina
- Mydaea
- Myiophaea
- Myospila
- Neivamyia
- Neodexiopsis
- Neohelina
- Neolimnophora
- Neomuscina
- Neomyia
- Neorypellia
- Neurotrixa
- Notoschoenomyza
- Nystomyia
- Ochromusca
- Ocypodomyia
- Ophyra
- Opsolasia
- Orchisia
- Oxytonocera
- Pachyceramyia
- Palpibracus
- Papuaia
- Papuaiella
- Paracoenosia
- Paralimnophora
- Parastomoxys
- Parvisquama
- Passeromyia
- Pectiniseta
- Pentacricia
- Phaomusca
- Phaonia
- Phaonidia
- Phaonina
- Philornis
- Pictia
- Pilispina
- Plexiopsis
- Plumispina
- Polietes
- Polietina
- Potamia
- Prohardyia
- Prostomoxys
- Pseudocoenosia
- Pseudohelina
- Pseudoptilolepis
- Psilochaeta
- Pygophora
- Pyrellia
- Pyrellina
- Reinwardtia
- Reynoldsia
- Rhabdoptera
- Rhinomusca
- Rhynchomydaea
- Rypellia
- Sarcopromusca
- Scenetes
- Schoenomyza
- Schoenomyzina
- Scutellomusca
- Sinophaonia
- Souzalopesmyia
- Spanochaeta
- Spathipheromyia
- Spilogona
- Stomopogon
- Stomoxys
- Stygeromyia
- Syllimnophora
- Syngamoptera
- Synthesiomyia
- Tamilomyia
- Tertiuseginia
- Tetramerinx
- Thaumasiochaeta
- Thricops
- Trichomorellia
- Villeneuvia
- Xenomorellia
- Xenomyia
- Xenotachina
- Xestomyia

== Types ==
- Types in the Natural History Museum of Berlin

== Images ==
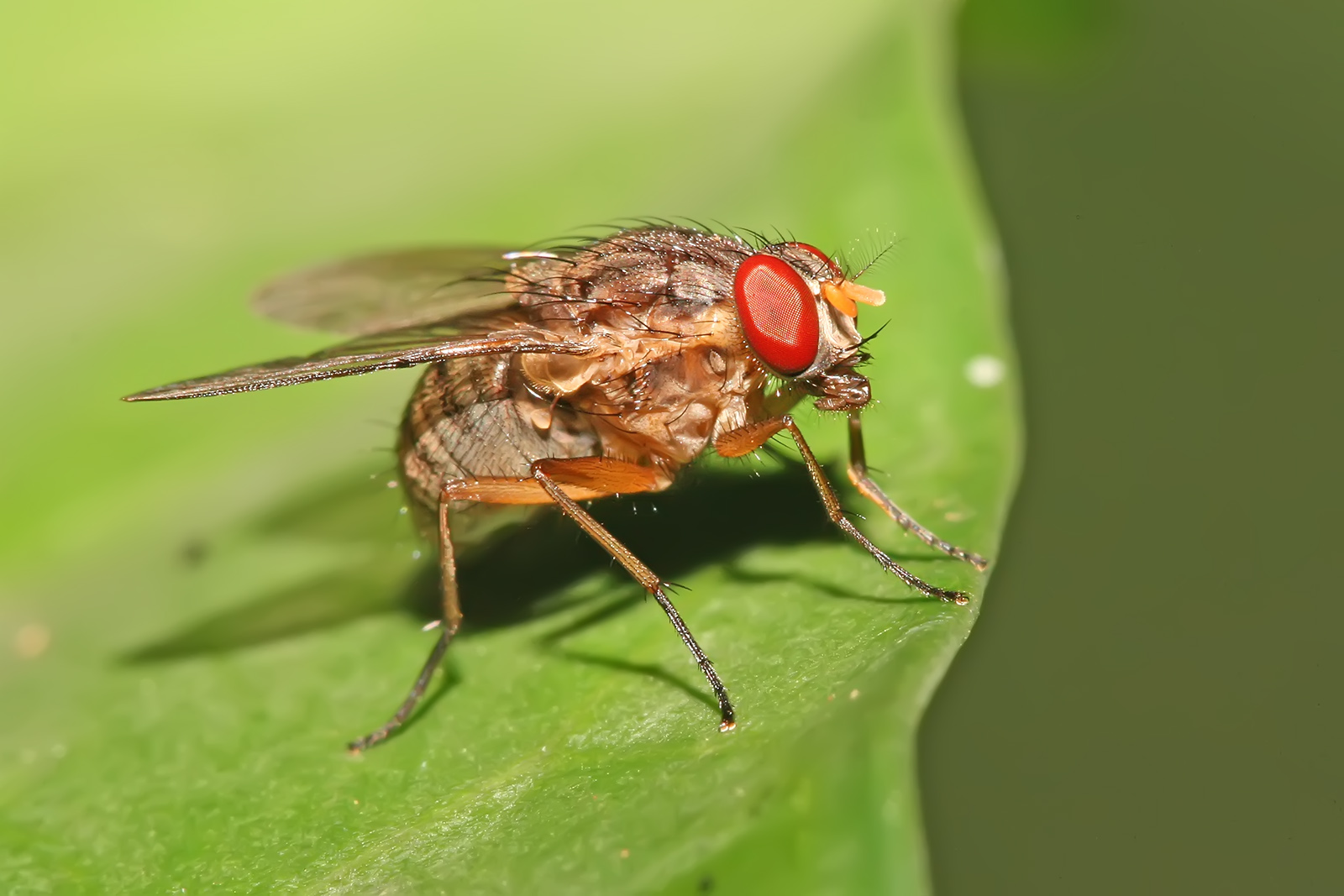
Mydaeinae sp.

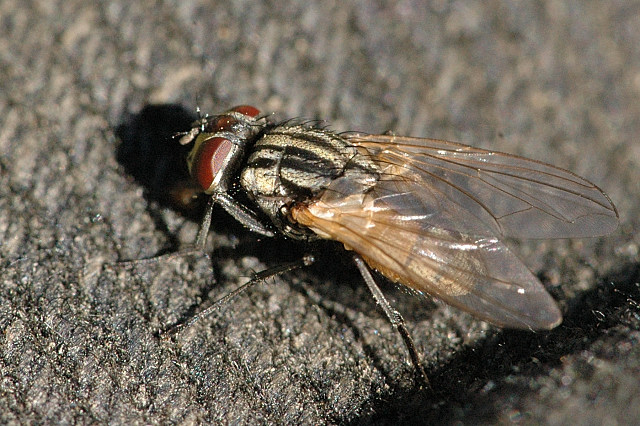
Musca domestica

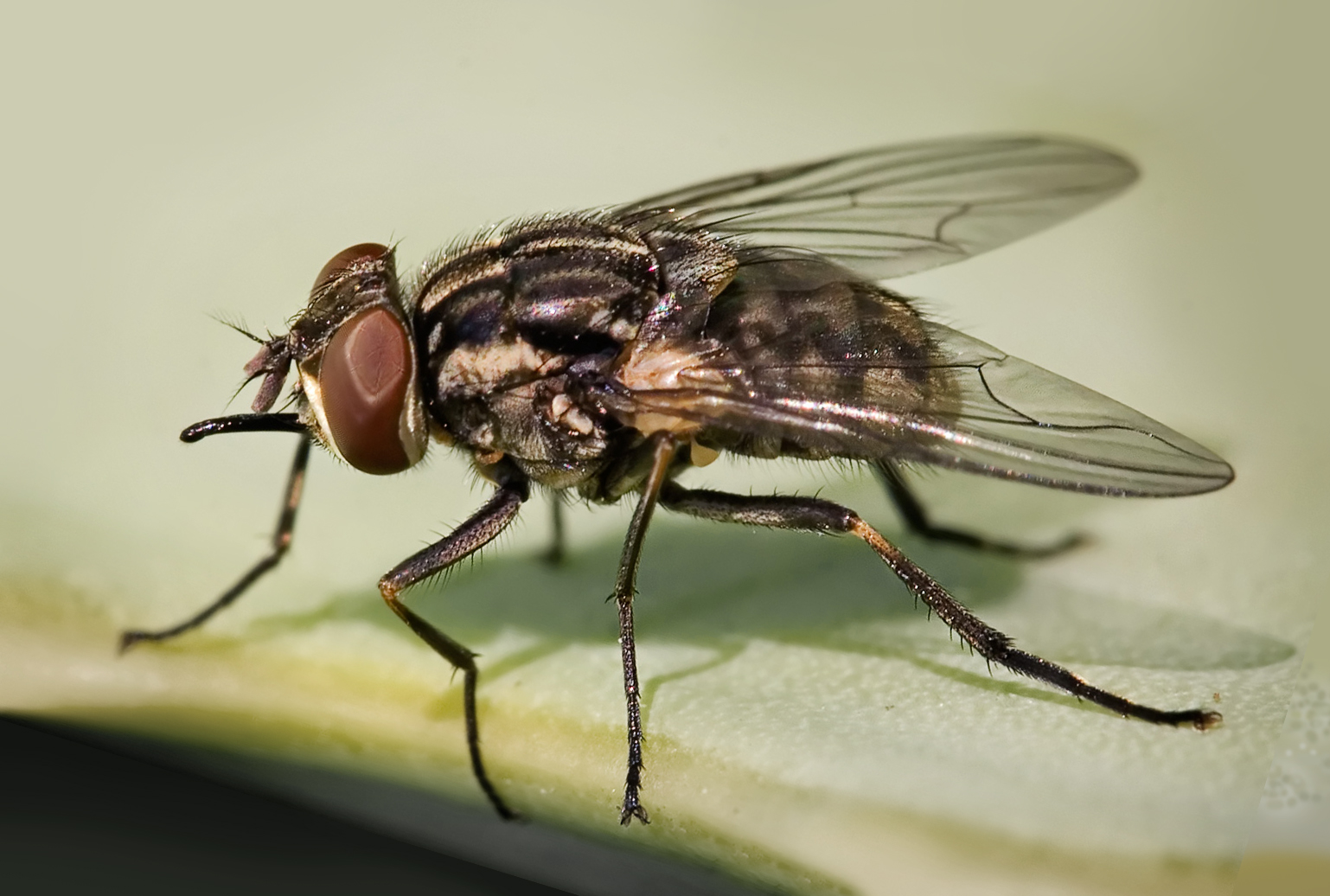
Stable fly, Stomoxys calcitrans, Albuquerque

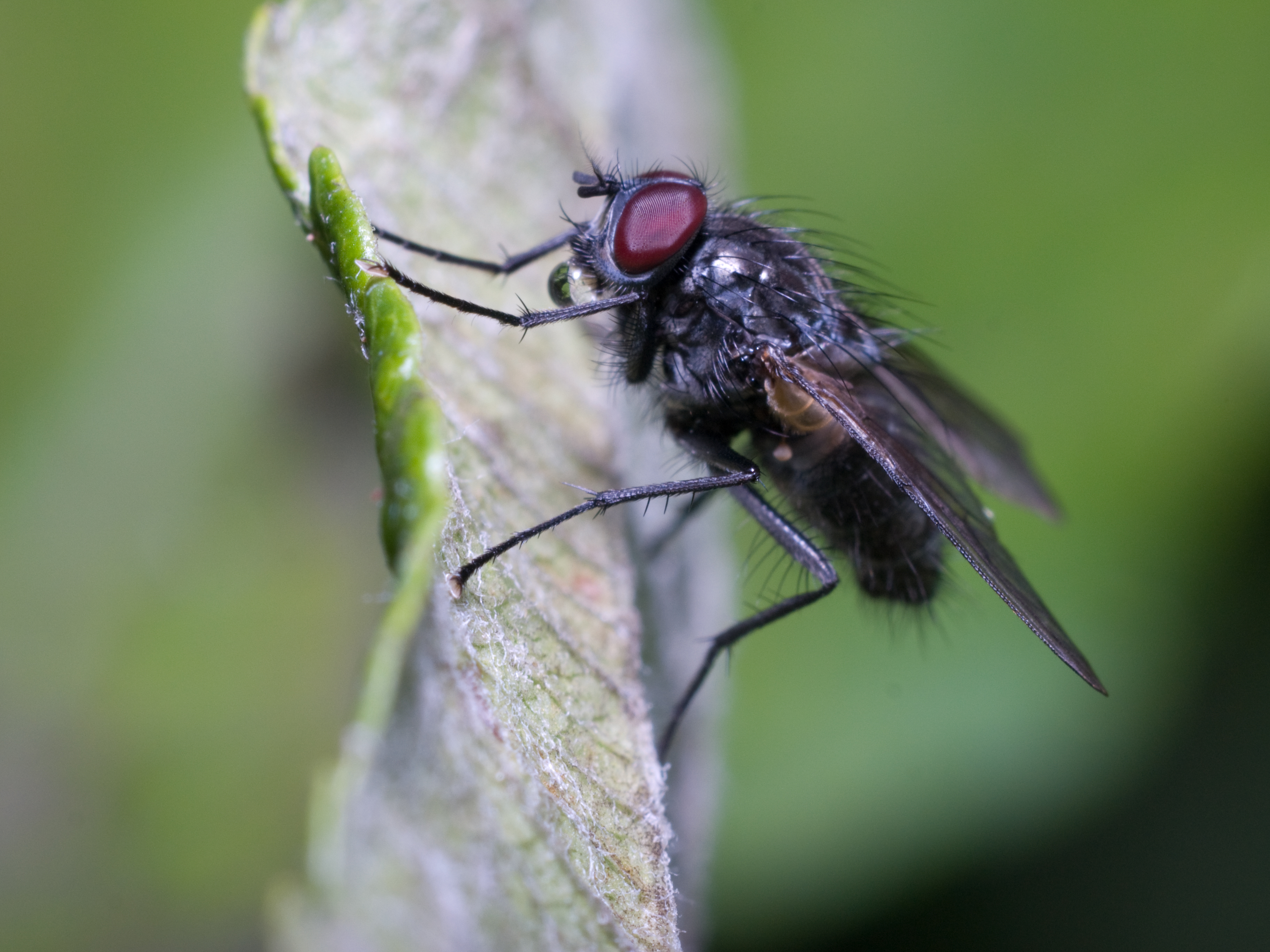
Muscidae sp.

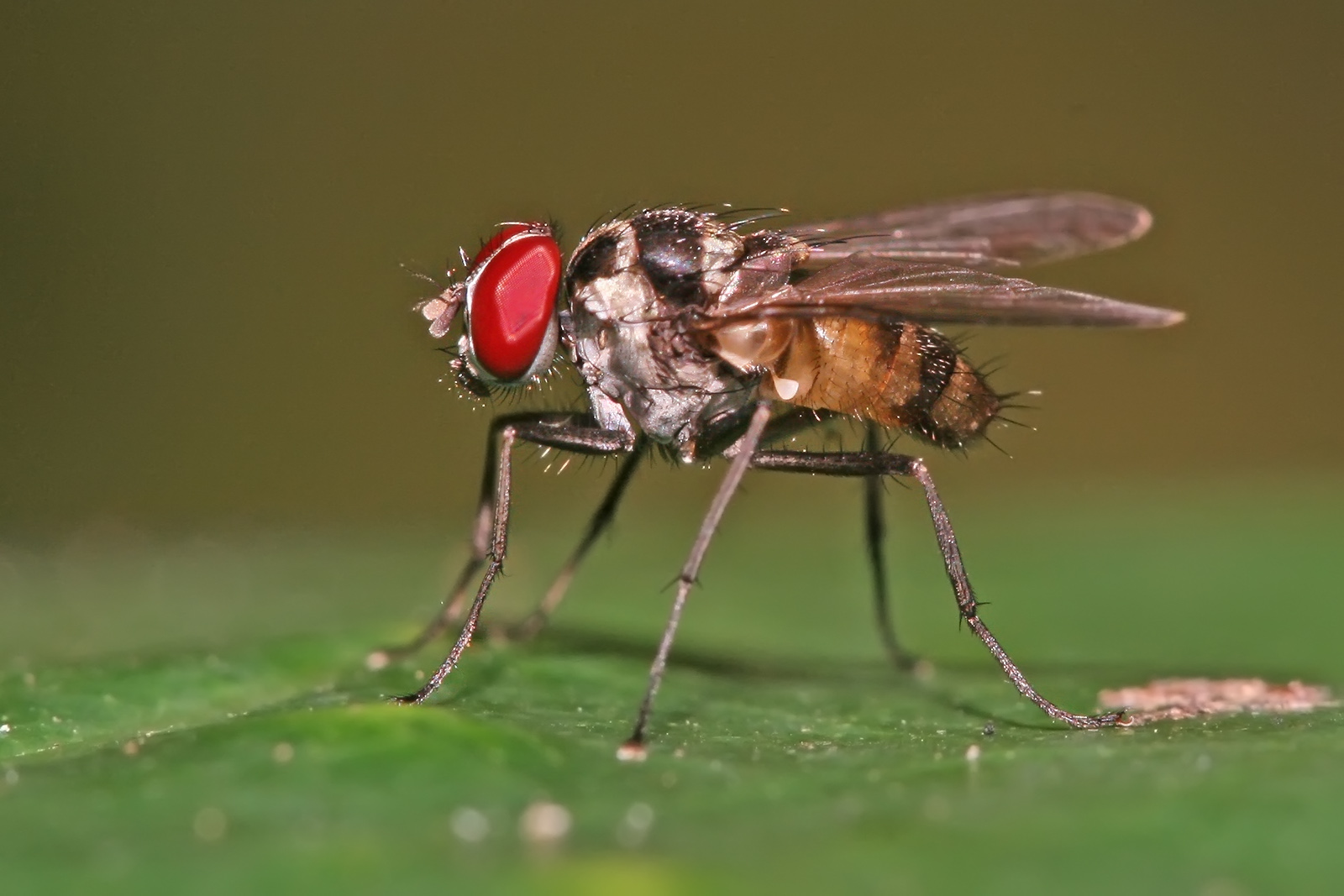
Limnophora sp.

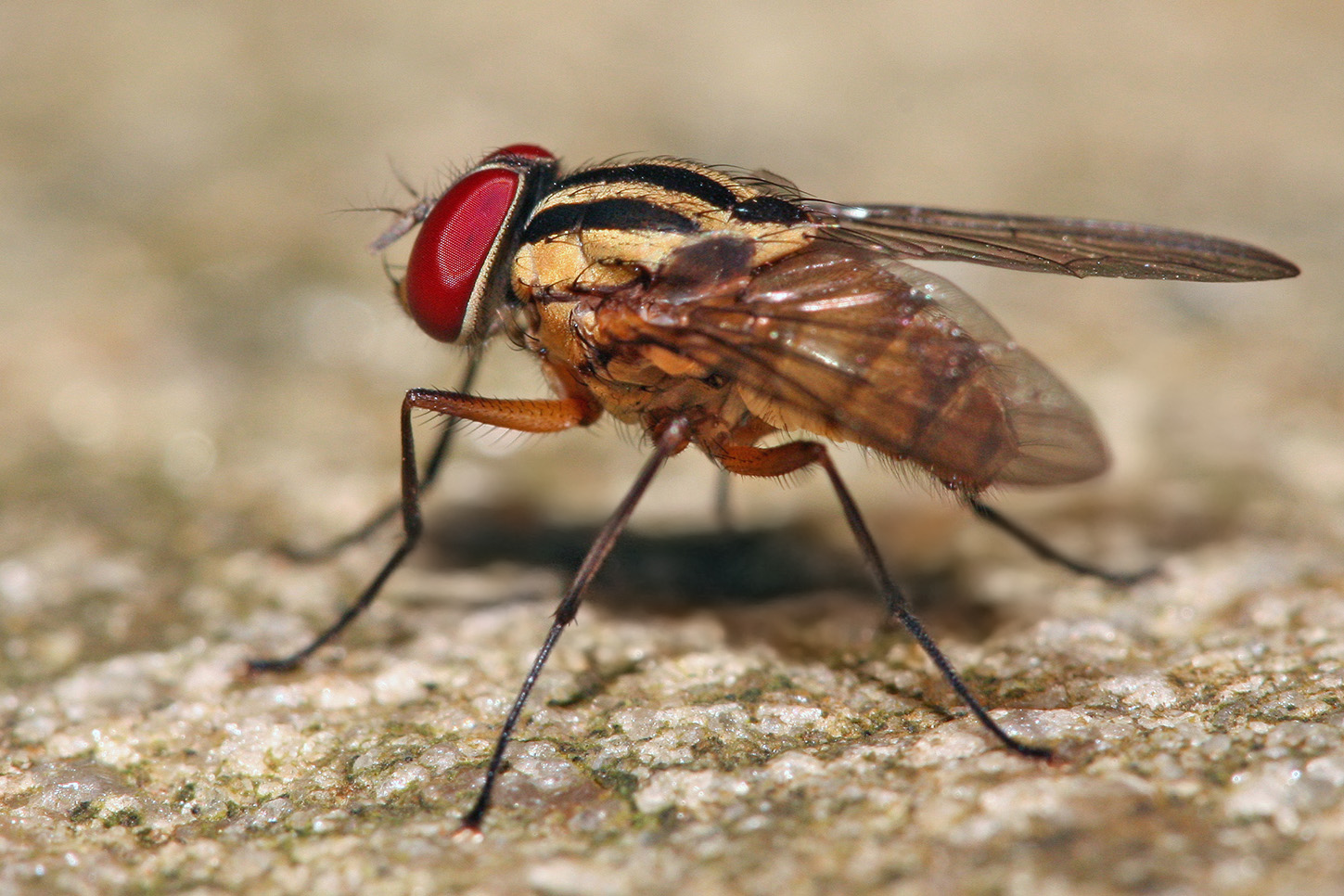
Graphomya eustolia

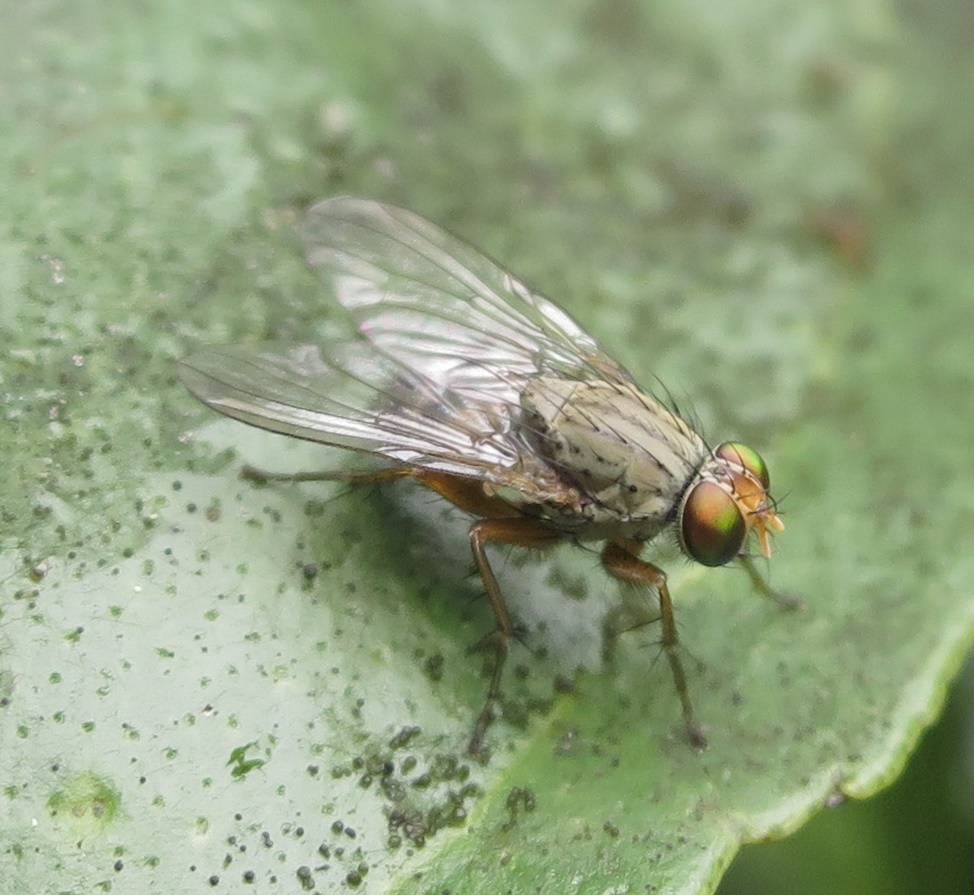
Pygophora apicalis

== Links to Genera and species lists ==
- Palaearctic
- Nearctic
- Japan
