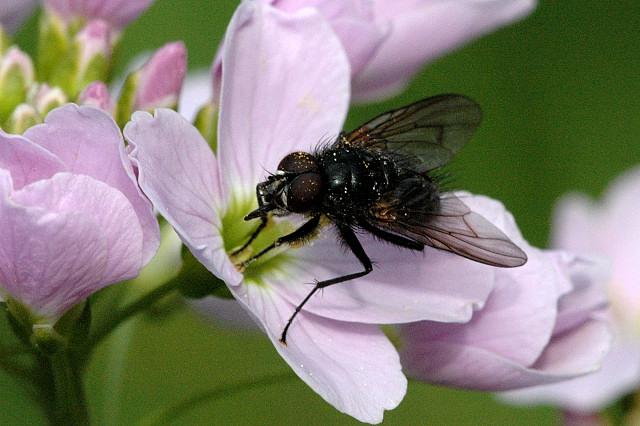

Scientific classification
- Kingdom: Animalia
- Phylum: Arthropoda
- Class: Insecta
- Order: Diptera
- Family: Muscidae
- Subfamily: Phaoniinae
- Tribe: Phaoniini
- Genus: Phaonia
- Species: P. siebecki

Binomial name
- Phaonia siebecki Schnabl in Schnabl & Dziedzicki, 1911

Synonyms
- Anthomyza confluens Stein, 1914

= Phaonia siebecki =

Species of fly

Phaonia siebecki is a species of fly which is distributed across parts the Palaearctic.
