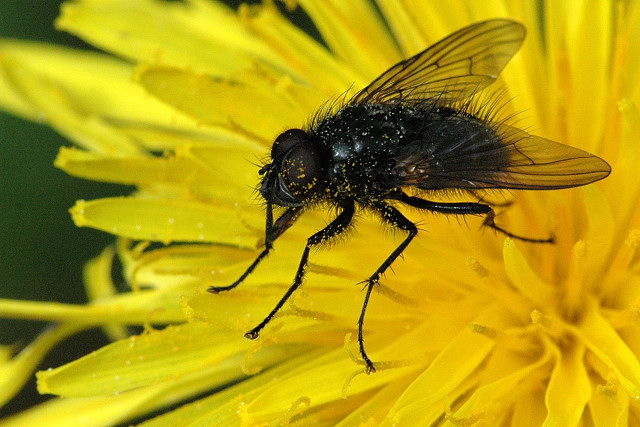
- Phaonia atriceps

Scientific classification
- Kingdom: Animalia
- Phylum: Arthropoda
- Clade: Pancrustacea
- Class: Insecta
- Order: Diptera
- Family: Muscidae
- Subfamily: Phaoniinae
- Tribe: Phaoniini
- Genus: Phaonia; Robineau-Desvoidy, 1830

Type species
- P. viarum Robineau-Desvoidy, 1830

Synonyms
- Dialyta Meigen, 1826; Dialytina Ringdahl, 1945; Hyetodesia authors; Hyetodesia Mik, 1881; Rohrella Robineau-Desvoidy, 1830; Wahlgrenia Ringdahl, 1929

= Phaonia =

Genus of flies

Phaonia is a very large genus from the fly family Muscidae. It is distributed worldwide, with more than 750 species having been described.

== Species list ==
- P. abditus (Giglio-Tos, 1893)
- P. aberrans Malloch, 1919
- P. acerba Stein, 1918
- P. acronocera Feng, 2002
- P. acrostichalis Emden, 1965
- P. adriani Zinovjev, 1994
- P. advena Snyder, 1957
- P. aethiopica Curran, 1938
- P. aizuensis Shinonaga, 2003
- P. alatavica Zinovjev, 1983
- P. albocalyptrata Malloch, 1920
- P. algida Zinovjev, 1983
- P. alpicola Zetterstedt, 1845
- P. alticiella Zinovjev, 1990
- P. alticola Malloch, 1923
- P. amabilis Meigen, 1826
- P. amamiensis Shinonaga & Kano, 1971
- P. amica Ma & Deng, 2002
- P. amicula Villeneuve, 1922
- P. ampycocerca Xue & Yang, 1998
- P. amurensis Hennig, 1963
- P. angelicae (Scopoli, 1763)
- P. angustifrons Shinonaga & Kano, 1971
- P. angustinudiseta Xue, 1998
- P. angustipalpata Xue, 1998
- P. angustiprosternum Ma, 1992
- P. anshuensis Wu, Li, Dong & Wei, 2016
- P. antennalis Huckett, 1966
- P. antenniangusta Xue, Chen & Cui, 1997
- P. antennicrassa Xue, 1988
- P. apicalis Stein, 1914
- P. apicaloides Ma & Cui, 1992
- P. apicata Johannsen, 1916
- P. apicefemorata Emden, 1965
- P. arcuaticauda Chen & Xue, 1997
- P. argentifrons Xue, Chen & Liang, 1993
- P. arida Zinovjev, 1983
- P. asiatica Hennig, 1963
- P. asierrans Zinovjev, 1981
- P. atkinsoni Emden, 1965
- P. atlanis Malloch, 1923
- P. atriceps (Loew, 1858)
- P. atrochaeta Zinovjev, 1980
- P. atrocitrea Malloch, 1923
- P. atrocyanea Ringdahl, 1916
- P. atronitens Malloch, 1921
- P. aurata Zinovjev, 1992
- P. aurea Malloch, 1923
- P. aureipollinosa Xue & Wang, 1986
- P. aureola Shinonaga & Kano, 1971
- P. aureolicauda Ma & Wu, 1989
- P. aureolimaculata Wu, 1988
- P. aureolitarsis Xue & Xiang, 1993
- P. aureoloides Hsue, 1984
- P. auricoxa Emden, 1965
- P. axinoides Feng, 1995
- P. ayubiensis Shinonaga, 2007
- P. azaleella Feng, 2002
- P. azygos Malloch, 1923
- P. babarabica Sorokina, 2015
- P. bacillirostris Xue & Wang, 2009
- P. bambusa Shinonaga & Kano, 1971
- P. bambusella Zinovjev, 1992
- P. bambusoida Ma, 2002
- P. baolini Feng, 2000
- P. baoxingensis Feng & Ma, 2002
- P. barkama Xue, 1998
- P. basichaeta Emden, 1965
- P. basiseta Malloch, 1920
- P. basisetosa Zinovjev, 1992
- P. beizhenensis Mou, 1986
- P. bella Carvalho, 1983
- P. benxiensis Xue & Yu, 1986
- P. berolinensis Hennig, 1963
- P. biauriculata Feng, 1998
- P. bicolorantis Xue, Wang & Du, 2006
- P. bidentata Ringdahl, 1933
- P. biseta Stein, 1913
- P. bitincta Rondani, 1866
- P. bitrigona Xue, 1984
- P. blaesomera Feng, 2002
- P. boliviana Coelho, 1998
- P. brendana Pont, 1976
- P. brevipalpata Fang & Fan, 1988
- P. breviplumosa Emden, 1965
- P. brevispina Malloch, 1923
- P. bruneiaurea Xue & Feng, 1986
- P. brunneiabdomina Xue & Cao, 1989
- P. brunneipalpis Mou, 1986
- P. brunneivittis Emden, 1943
- P. bulanga Xue, 1998
- P. bulbiclavula Xue & Li, 2001
- P. bumbusoides Ma, 1998
- P. bysia Walker, 1849
- P. caeruleicolor Stein, 1910
- P. caerulescens Stein, 1898
- P. calceicerca Xue, 1998
- P. californiensis Malloch, 1923
- P. canaliculata Robineau-Desvoidy, 1830
- P. canariensis Villeneuve, 1936
- P. canescens Stein, 1916
- P. carvalhoi Coelho, 1998
- P. caudilata Fang & Fan, 1993
- P. cauta Huckett, 1973
- P. centa Feng & Ma, 2002
- P. cercoechinata Fang & Fan, 1986
- P. cercoechinatoida Feng & Ma, 2002
- P. chalchica Zinovjev, 1980
- P. chalcica Zinovjev, 1980
- P. changaica Zinovjev, 1990
- P. changbaishanensis Ma & Wang, 1992
- P. chaoyangensis Zhang, Cui & Wang, 1993
- P. chianshanensis Ma & Wang, 1980
- P. chilitica Deng & Feng, 1998
- P. chuanierrans Xue & Feng, 1986
- P. chuanxiensis Feng & Ma, 2002
- P. cilitibia Albuquerque, 1955
- P. cilitibia Emden, 1965
- P. cincta Zetterstedt, 1846
- P. cineripollinosa Xue, Tong & Wang, 2008
- P. clavitarsis Feng & Ma, 2002
- P. colbrani Collin, 1953
- P. comihumera Feng & Ma, 2002
- P. consobrina Zetterstedt, 1838
- P. coriatlanis Huckett, 1966
- P. coriatlanis Huckett, 1966
- P. cothurnoloba Xue & Feng, 1986
- P. crassicauda Xue, Chen & Liang, 1993
- P. crassipalpis Shinonaga & Kano, 1971
- P. crata Sun, Wu, Li & Wei, 2015
- P. crytoista Fang & Fan, 1993
- P. cuprina Feng & Ma, 2002
- P. curvicercalis Wei, 1990
- P. curvinervis Malloch, 1923
- P. curvipes Stein, 1920
- P. curviseta Emden, 1965
- P. curviseta Xue & Yu, 2017
- P. cuthbertsoni Curran, 1938
- P. cylosternita Xue, 1998
- P. czernyi Hennig, 1963
- P. dahurica Zinovjev, 1990
- P. datongensis Xue & Wang, 1986
- P. dawushaensis Xue & Liu, 1985
- P. daxinganlinga Ma & Cui, 2002
- P. daxiongi Feng, 2001
- P. dayiensis Ma & Deng, 2002
- P. debiliaureola Xue & Cui, 1996
- P. debiliceps Xue, 1998
- P. debilifemoralis Xue & Cui, 1996
- P. debilis Stein, 1918
- P. decussatoides Ma & Wu, 1989
- P. deformicauda Xue & Li, 2001
- P. deleta Stein, 1898
- P. dianierrans Xue & Li, 1991
- P. dianxiia Li & Xue, 2001
- P. diruta Stein, 1898
- P. discauda Wei, 1994
- P. disjuncta Stein, 1916
- P. dismagnicornis Xue & Cao, 1989
- P. dissimilis Malloch, 1923
- P. dorsolineata Shinonaga & Kano, 1971
- P. dorsolineatoides Ma & Xue, 1992
- P. dupliciseta Ma & Cui, 1992
- P. duplicispina Deng & Ma, 2002
- P. edwardsi Emden, 1943
- P. electrica Pont & Carvalho, 1997
- P. emaishanensis Xue, 1998
- P. equatorialis Coelho, 1998
- P. erlangshanensis Ma & Feng, 1998
- P. errans Meigen, 1826
- P. erronea Schnabl, 1887
- P. exoleta Meigen, 1826
- P. falleni Michelsen, 1977
- P. falsifuscicoxa Fang & Fan, 1993
- P. fangshanensis Wang, Xue & Wu, 1997
- P. fani Ma, 1992
- P. fanjingshana Xue, Chen & Cui, 1997
- P. fausta Huckett, 1965
- P. fengyani Xue, 2017
- P. fergusoni Malloch, 1924
- P. fimbripeda Yang, Xue & Li, 2002
- P. fissa Xue, 1984
- P. flaticerca Deng & Feng, 1998
- P. flava Stein, 1920
- P. flavibasis Malloch, 1919
- P. flavicauda Cui, Zhang & Xue, 1998
- P. flavicornis Stein, 1913
- P. flavinota Emden, 1965
- P. flavipes Feng & Ma, 2002
- P. flavitibia Johannsen, 1916
- P. flavivivida Xue & Cao, 1989
- P. flavomaculata Malloch, 1921
- P. fortis Feng & Ma, 2002
- P. fraterna Malloch, 1923
- P. freyana Emden, 1965
- P. fugax Tiensuu, 1946
- P. fulviscenticoxa Feng & Ma, 2002
- P. fulviscentitarsis Feng & Ma, 2002
- P. fusca Meade, 1897
- P. fuscana Huckett, 1965
- P. fuscata Fallén, 1825
- P. fusciantenna Feng & Ma, 2002
- P. fusciapicalis Feng & Ma, 2002
- P. fusciaurea Xue & Feng, 1986
- P. fuscibasicosta Ma & Deng, 2002
- P. fuscicauda Malloch, 1918
- P. fuscicoxa Emden, 1965
- P. fuscipalpis Shinonaga & Kano, 1971
- P. fuscisquama Wulp, 1896
- P. fuscitibia Shinonaga & Kano, 1971
- P. fuscitrochanter Ma & Deng, 2002
- P. fuscula Xue & Zhang, 1996
- P. ganshuensis Ma & Wu, 1992
- P. gergetica Zinovjev, 1994
- P. giacomeli Carvalho, 1981
- P. gilgitensis Shinonaga, 2007
- P. glauca Malloch, 1931
- P. gobertii Mik, 1881
- P. gracilis Stein, 1916
- P. graciloides Ma & Wang, 1985
- P. grunini Zinovjev, 1980
- P. grunnicornis Xue, 1998
- P. guangdongensis Xue & Liu, 1985
- P. guizhouensis Wei, 1991
- P. gulianensis Ma & Cui, 1992
- P. guttiventris Emden, 1943
- P. hainanensis Xue, Tong & Wang, 2008
- P. halophila Zinovjev, 1990
- P. halterata Stein, 1898
- P. hamiloba Ma & Wang, 1992
- P. hanyuanensis Feng & Ma, 2002
- P. harti Malloch, 1923
- P. hebeta Fang & Fan, 1986
- P. hebetoida Ma & Deng, 2002
- P. heilongjiangensis Ma & Cui, 1992
- P. heilongshanensis Xue, Cui & Zhang, 1996
- P. hejinga Xue, 1998
- P. hellenia Lyneborg, 1965
- P. helvitibia Feng, 2002
- P. hennigi Lyneborg, 1970
- P. heteromma Emden, 1965
- P. himalaica Zinovjev, 1992
- P. hirtifrons Karl, 1940
- P. hirtiorbitalis Xue, Wang & Du, 2006
- P. hirtitibia Feng & Ma, 1994
- P. hohuanshanensis Shinonaga & Huang, 2007
- P. hokkaidensis Shinonaga & Kano, 1971
- P. holcocerca Feng & Ma, 2000
- P. honshuensis Shinonaga, 2003
- P. horii Shinonaga & Kano, 1971
- P. houghii Stein, 1898
- P. huanrenensis Xue, 1984
- P. hucketti Coelho, 1998
- P. hugonis Carvalho, 1991
- P. humeralis Schnabl in Schnabl & Dziedzicki, 1911
- P. hunyuanensis Ma & Feng, 1998
- P. hunza Shinonaga, 2007
- P. hybrida (Schnabl, 1888)
- P. hydrocharis Shinonaga & Kano, 1971
- P. hystricosternita Xue, 1991
- P. illustradorsata Feng & Ma, 2002
- P. imitatrix Malloch, 1919
- P. imitenuiseta Xue & Zhang, 1996
- P. impigerata Feng & Ma, 2002
- P. impura Zinovjev, 1987
- P. incana Wiedemann, 1817
- P. inenarrabilis Huckett, 1965
- P. insetitibia Fang & Fan, 1988
- P. interfrontalis Emden, 1965
- P. iozen Shinonaga & Kano, 1971
- P. irkutensis Zinovjev, 1990
- P. ishizuchiensis Shinonaga & Kano, 1971
- P. japonica Shinonaga & Kano, 1971
- P. jaroschewskii (Schnabl, 1888)
- P. jiagedaqiensis Ma & Cui, 1992
- P. jilinensis Ma & Wang, 1992
- P. jinbeiensis Xue & Wang, 1989
- P. jiulongensis Xue, Tong & Wang, 2008
- P. jomdaensis Xue, 1998
- P. juglans Sorokina, 2015
- P. jugorum Stein, 1916
- P. kaala Shinonaga, 1994
- P. kagaensis Shinonaga, 2003
- P. kagannensis Shinonaga, 2007
- P. kambaitiana Emden, 1965
- P. kamchatkensis Shinonaga & Zhang, 2000
- P. kanoi Shinonaga & Huang, 2007
- P. kashmirensis Malloch, 1921
- P. kaszabi Zinovjev, 1990
- P. katoi Shinonaga & Kano, 1971
- P. khumbuensis Shinonaga, 1994
- P. khunjerabensis Shinonaga, 2007
- P. kirghizorum Malyanov, 1993
- P. klinostoichas Xue, Tong & Wang, 2008
- P. kobica Schnabl in Schnabl & Dziedzicki, 1911
- P. kuankuoshuiensis Wei, 1990
- P. kugleri Lyneborg, 1965
- P. labidocerca Feng & Ma, 2002
- P. labidosternita Sun & Feng, 2004
- P. laeta Fallén, 1823
- P. lalashanensis Shinonaga & Huang, 2007
- P. lamellata Fang, Li & Deng, 1986
- P. lamellicauda Xue & Feng, 2002
- P. laminidenta Xue & Cui, 1997
- P. latecostata Emden, 1965
- P. laticornis Malloch, 1923
- P. laticrassa Xue, Chen & Cui, 1997
- P. latierrans Xue, 1998
- P. latifrons Schnabl in Schnabl & Dziedzicki, 1911
- P. latifrontalis Hennig, 1963
- P. latilamella Feng & Ma, 2002
- P. latimargina Fang & Fan, 1988
- P. latipalpis Schnabl in Schnabl & Dziedzicki, 1911
- P. latipullatoides Wang, 1998
- P. latistriata Deng & Feng, 1998
- P. leichopodosa Sun, Feng & Ma, 2001
- P. leigongshana Wei & Yang, 2007
- P. lentiginosa Snyder, 1957
- P. lepelleyi Emden, 1943
- P. leptocorax Li & Xue, 1998
- P. liaoningensis Ma & Xue, 1998
- P. liaoshiensis Zhang & Zhang, 1995
- P. liliputa Zinovjev, 1990
- P. limbinervis Stein, 1918
- P. lithuanica Schnabl in Schnabl & Dziedzicki, 1911
- P. liujiayui Xue & Du, 2020
- P. liupanshanensis Ma, 2002
- P. longicornis Stein, 1916
- P. longifurca Xue, 1984
- P. longipalpis Emden, 1965
- P. longiplumosa Emden, 1965
- P. longirostris Xue & Zhao, 1998
- P. longiseta Feng & Ma, 2002
- P. lucidula Fang & Fan, 1993
- P. luculenta Fang & Fan, 1993
- P. luculentimacula Xue, 2000
- P. lugubris Meigen, 1826
- P. lushuiensis Xue & Li, 2001
- P. luteipes Emden, 1965
- P. luteovittata Shinonaga & Kano, 1971
- P. luteovittoida Feng & Ma, 2002
- P. lutescens Zinovjev, 1990
- P. macroomata Xue & Yang, 1998
- P. macropygus Feng, 1998
- P. macrostemma Emden, 1965
- P. maculiaurea Xue & Wang, 1998
- P. maculiaureata Wang & Xue, 1997
- P. maculierrans Xue, Zhang & Chen, 1993
- P. maculosa Stein, 1911
- P. magna Wei, 1994
- P. magnicornis Zetterstedt, 1845
- P. magnipalpis Emden, 1965
- P. mai Xue, 1998
- P. major Carvalho, 1984
- P. majuscula Emden, 1951
- P. malaiseana Emden, 1965
- P. malaisei Ringdahl, 1930
- P. malayana Malloch, 1935
- P. maowenensis Deng & Feng, 1998
- P. marakandensis Hennig, 1963
- P. margina Wei & Yang, 2007
- P. marginata Stein, 1918
- P. marylandica Malloch, 1923
- P. mediterranea Hennig, 1963
- P. megacerca Feng & Ma, 2002
- P. megastigma Ma & Feng, 1998
- P. megistogenysa Feng & Ma, 2002
- P. meigeni Pont, 1986
- P. mengi Feng & Ma, 2000
- P. mengshanensis Feng, 1993
- P. metallica Zielke, 1970
- P. mexicana Carvalho, 1984
- P. microthelis Fang, Fan & Feng, 1991
- P. mimerrans Ma, 1989
- P. mimoaureola Ma, Ge & Li, 1992
- P. mimobitrigona Xue, 1988
- P. mimocandicans Ma, 1991
- P. mimoincana Feng & Ma, 1994
- P. mimopalpata Ma & Cui, 1992
- P. mimotenuiseta Ma & Wu, 1989
- P. mimovivida Feng & Ma, 1994
- P. minoricalcar Wei, 1994
- P. minuscula Albuquerque, 1955
- P. minuta Carvalho, 1984
- P. minutimutina Xue, 1998
- P. minutiungula Zhang & Xue, 1996
- P. minutivillana Xue, Yang & Li, 2000
- P. misellimaculata Feng & Ma, 2002
- P. modesta Sorokina, 2015
- P. mogii Shinonaga & Kurahashi, 2006
- P. mongolica Zinovjev, 1980
- P. monochaeta Snyder, 1957
- P. montana Shinonaga & Kano, 1971
- P. monticola Malloch, 1918
- P. musashinensis Shinonaga, 2003
- P. muscinoides Emden, 1943
- P. mystica (Meigen, 1826)
- P. mysticoides Ma & Wang, 1980
- P. nakanishii Shinonaga, 1994
- P. nana Shinonaga, 2003
- P. nasiglobata Xue & Xiang, 1993
- P. naticerca Xue, Chen & Liang, 1993
- P. neglecta Huckett, 1966
- P. nepenthincola Stein, 1909
- P. nigeritegula Feng, 2002
- P. nigerrima Carvalho, 1984
- P. nigribasalis Xue, 1998
- P. nigribasicosta Xue, 1998
- P. nigribitrigona Yu & Xue, 2017
- P. nigricans Johannsen, 1916
- P. nigricauda Malloch, 1918
- P. nigricorpus Shinonaga & Huang, 2007
- P. nigricoxa Deng & Feng, 1998
- P. nigrierrans Cui, Zhang & Xue, 1998
- P. nigrifusca Xue, 1998
- P. nigrifuscicoxa Xue, Wang & Du, 2006
- P. nigrigenis Feng & Ma, 1994
- P. nigriorbitalis Xue, 1998
- P. nigripennis Ma & Cui, 1992
- P. nigrirostrata Zinovjev, 1983
- P. nigriserva Xue, 1998
- P. nigrisquamma Stein, 1908
- P. nigritenuiseta Xue & Zhang, 1996
- P. nigrivillana Xue, Yang & Li, 2000
- P. nigrocincta Stein, 1918
- P. nigrogeniculata Shinonaga & Kano, 1971
- P. ninae Sorokina, 2015
- P. ningwuensis Wang & Xue, 1998
- P. ningxiaensis Ma & Zhao, 1992
- P. nitidula Zinovjev, 1992
- P. nititerga Xue, 1988
- P. nitiventris Xue & Zhang, 1996
- P. niximountaina Xue & Yu, 2017
- P. notofusca Zinovjev, 1983
- P. nounechesa Wei & Yang, 2007
- P. nuditarsis Xue & Wang, 2009
- P. nymphaearum Robineau-Desvoidy, 1830
- P. obscurinervis Stein, 1914
- P. obsoleta Hennig, 1963
- P. ocellaris Malloch, 1929
- P. ommatina Zinovjev, 1981
- P. oncocerca Feng & Ma, 2002
- P. ontakensis Shinonaga, 2003
- P. opalina Schnabl in Schnabl & Dziedzicki, 1911
- P. orientalis Xue, Song & Chen, 2002
- P. oxystoma Emden, 1965
- P. oxystomodes Emden, 1965
- P. paederocerca Feng & Ma, 2002
- P. pallida Fabricius, 1787
- P. pallidisquama Zetterstedt, 1849
- P. pallidosa Huckett, 1965
- P. pallidula Coquillett, 1902
- P. palpata Stein, 1897
- P. palpibrevis Xue, 1998
- P. palpinormalis Feng & Ma, 2002
- P. papillaria Fang & Fan, 1993
- P. paradecussata Hennig, 1963
- P. paradisia Li & Xue, 2001
- P. paradisincola Xue, Zhang & Zhu, 2006
- P. parahebata Ma & Deng, 2002
- P. parallelifrons Emden, 1943
- P. paramersicrassa Xue, 1998
- P. pardiungula Xue & Li, 2001
- P. parviceps Malloch, 1918
- P. patersoni Zielke, 1971
- P. pattalocerca Feng, 1998
- P. paucispina Fang & Cui, 1988
- P. pendleburyi Malloch, 1935
- P. pennifuscata Fan, 1996
- P. perdita Meigen, 1830
- P. peregrina Malloch, 1921
- P. peregrinans Huckett, 1965
- P. perfida Stein, 1920
- P. picealis Huckett, 1965
- P. pilosipennis Xue, Zhang & Zhu, 2006
- P. pilosiventris Feng, 1998
- P. pingbaensis Wu, Dong & Wei, 2015
- P. planeta Feng & Ma, 2002
- P. platysurstylus Xue & Wang, 2009
- P. plurivittata Couri, Pont & Penny, 2006
- P. ponti Coelho, 1998
- P. postifugax Xue, 1998
- P. praefuscifemora Feng & Ma, 2002
- P. pratensis Robineau-Desvoidy, 1830
- P. prisca Stein, 1920
- P. proocellata Emden, 1965
- P. protrusa Shinonaga, 1994
- P. protuberans Malloch, 1923
- P. proxima Wulp, 1869
- P. pseuderrans Hennig, 1963
- P. pseudofuscata Shinonaga, 2003
- P. pseudomystica Zinovjev, 1987
- P. pterospila Stein, 1918
- P. pudoa Hall, 1937
- P. pullata Czerny, 1900
- P. pullatoides Xue & Zhao, 1985
- P. pulvillata Stein, 1904
- P. punctinerva Xue, 1988
- P. punctinervis Stein, 1911
- P. punctipennis Shinonaga & Kano, 1971
- P. punoensis Coelho, 1998
- P. pusilla Zinovjev, 1990
- P. qingheensis Xue, 1984
- P. qinshuiensis Wang, Xue & Wu, 1997
- P. quercus Coelho, 1998
- P. quieta Stein, 1920
- P. reclusa Huckett, 1966
- P. recta Hsue, 1984
- P. rectinervis Emden, 1965
- P. rectoides Xue, 1998
- P. redactata Feng, 1998
- P. reflecta Huckett, 1966
- P. reniformis Fang, Fan & Feng, 1991
- P. reversa Huckett, 1966
- P. rhodesi Malloch, 1929
- P. ripara Liu & Xue, 1996
- P. robusta Carvalho, 1984
- P. rossica Lavciev, 1971
- P. rubriventris Emden, 1965
- P. rubriventris ssp. flaviventris Wei, 1991
- P. rufibasis Malloch, 1919
- P. rufihalter Ma & Cui, 1998
- P. rufipalpis Macquart, 1835
- P. rufiventris (Scopoli, 1763)
- P. rufivulgaris Xue & Wang, 1989
- P. rugia Walker, 1849
- P. ryukyuensis Shinonaga & Kano, 1971
- P. sagami Shinonaga & Kano, 1971
- P. saltuosa Shinonaga & Kano, 1971
- P. sasakii Shinonaga & Huang, 2007
- P. savonoskii Malloch, 1923
- P. scotti Emden, 1943
- P. scrofigena Ma & Xue, 1998
- P. scutellata Zetterstedt, 1845
- P. semicarina Fan, 1996
- P. semilunara Feng, 2000
- P. semilunaroida Feng, 2002
- P. septentrionalis Xue & Yu, 1986
- P. seriesetosa Emden, 1965
- P. serva Meigen, 1826
- P. seticaudata Shinonaga & Kano, 1971
- P. setisternita Ma & Deng, 2002
- P. shaanxiensis Xue & Cao, 1989
- P. shannoni Carvalho & Pont, 1993
- P. shanxiensis Zhang, Zhao & Wu, 1985
- P. shenyangensis Ma, 1998
- P. shuierrans Feng, 1995
- P. sibirica Pont, 1981
- P. sichotensis Zinovjev, 1980
- P. siebecki Schnabl in Schnabl & Dziedzicki, 1911
- P. simulans Malloch, 1931
- P. sinidecussata Xue & Xiang, 1993
- P. sinierrans Xue & Cao, 1989
- P. sobriana Huckett, 1966
- P. soccata Walker, 1849
- P. soratiensis Coelho, 1998
- P. sordidisquama Stein & Becker, 1908
- P. sparsicilium Xue & Wang, 2009
- P. spinicauda Xue, 2000
- P. splendida Hennig, 1963
- P. splendida Carvalho, 1983
- P. spuripilipes Fang & Fan, 1993
- P. stackelbergi Hennig, 1963
- P. stenoparafacia Fang & Fan, 1993
- P. striata Stein, 1898
- P. subalpicola Xue, 1998
- P. subalpicoloida Ma & Deng, 2002
- P. subapicalis Wei, 1991
- P. subaureola Feng & Ma, 2002
- P. subaureola Xue, Zhang & Chen, 1993
- P. subcandicans Zinovjev, 1983
- P. subconsobrina Ma, 1992
- P. subdecussata Hennig, 1963
- P. subeiensis Ma & Wu, 1992
- P. subemarginata Fang, Li & Deng, 1986
- P. suberrans Feng, 1989
- P. subfausta Ma & Wu, 1989
- P. subflavivida Feng & Ma, 2002
- P. subfusca Malloch, 1923
- P. subfuscibasicosta Feng & Ma, 2002
- P. subfuscinervis Zetterstedt, 1838
- P. subfuscitrochenter Ma & Deng, 2002
- P. subhybrida Feng & Ma, 2002
- P. sublatilamella Xue & Wang, 2009
- P. submontana Ma, 1992
- P. submystica Xue & Cao, 1989
- P. submysticoida Ma & Wang, 2002
- P. subnigra Shinonaga & Kano, 1971
- P. subnigrisquama Xue & Li, 1989
- P. subnigrisquama Xue & Zhao, 1992
- P. subnudiseta Xue, 1998
- P. subpalpata Fang, Li & Deng, 1986
- P. subpilipes Xue & Yu, 2017
- P. subpilosipennis Wu, Dong & Wei, 2015
- P. subprofugax Xue, 1984
- P. subpullata Wei, 1994
- P. subpunctinerva Feng & Ma, 2002
- P. subscutellata Xue, 1991
- P. subsemilunara Feng, 2000
- P. subtenuiseta Ma & Wu, 1989
- P. subtrimaculata Feng & Ma, 2002
- P. subtrisetiacerba Ma & Deng, 2002
- P. subventa Harris, 1780
- P. subvivida Ma & Cui, 1992
- P. succini Pont & Carvalho, 1997
- P. succintiantenna Feng & Ma, 2002
- P. suecica Ringdahl, 1947
- P. sumatrana Malloch, 1928
- P. sunqiia Xue & Du, 2020
- P. sunwuensis Xue & Ma, 1998
- P. supernapica Feng & Ma, 2000
- P. suscepta Xue, 1998
- P. suturalis Stein, 1913
- P. sytschevskajae Hennig, 1963
- P. szelenyii Mihályi, 1974
- P. taigensis Zinovjev, 1987
- P. taiwanensis Shinonaga & Huang, 2007
- P. taizipingga Feng, 2002
- P. tenebriona Huckett, 1965
- P. tenuilobatus Sun, Wu, Li & Wei, 2015
- P. tersa Villeneuve, 1936
- P. tetragona Gaminara, 1930
- P. tettigona Feng & Ma, 2002
- P. texensis Malloch, 1923
- P. thomsoni Malloch, 1921
- P. thudamensis Shinonaga, 1994
- P. tianmushanensis Xue & Du, 2020
- P. tianshanensis Xue, 1998
- P. tianshanica Zinovjev, 1983
- P. tiefii (Schnabl, 1888)
- P. tinctiscutaris Xue, Zhang & Zhu, 2006
- P. tipulivora Malloch, 1923
- P. trimaculata Bouché, 1834
- P. triseriata Emden, 1965
- P. tristriolata Ma, 1992
- P. trivialis Malloch, 1923
- P. trypetiformis Shinonaga, 1998
- P. tuberosurstyla Deng & Feng, 1998
- P. tuguriorum Scopoli, 1763
- P. umbrinervis Stein, 1910
- P. uniseriata Malloch, 1923
- P. unispina Xue, Chen & Liang, 1993
- P. univittata Couri, Pont & Penny, 2006
- P. ussuriensis Zinovjev, 1980
- P. vagata Xue & Wang, 1985
- P. vagatiorientalis Xue, 1998
- P. valida (Harris, 1780)
- P. varicolor Wei, 1990
- P. varimacula Feng & Ma, 2002
- P. venisetosa Emden, 1965
- P. versicolor Stein, 1920
- P. vichelseni Zinovjev, 1992
- P. vietnamensis Shinonaga, 2000
- P. villana Robineau-Desvoidy, 1830
- P. villscutellata Xue, 2000
- P. virgata Stein, 1913
- P. vittihorax Stein, 1913
- P. vividiformis Fang, Fan & Feng, 1991
- P. vulgaris Shinonaga & Kano, 1971
- P. wahlbergi Ringdahl, 1930
- P. wanfodinga Feng & Ma, 2002
- P. wangpingga Xue & Du, 2020
- P. wenshuiensis Zhang, Zhao & Wu, 1985
- P. whiteheadi Malloch, 1928
- P. winnemanae Malloch, 1919
- P. wulinga Xue, 1998
- P. xanthofemina Shinonaga & Kano, 1971
- P. xanthopleura Emden, 1965
- P. xanthosoma Shinonaga & Huang, 2007
- P. xianensis Xue & Cao, 1989
- P. xiangningensis Ma & Wang, 1985
- P. xihuaensis Sun & Feng, 2004
- P. xingxianensis Ma & Wang, 1985
- P. xishuensis Feng & Ma, 2002
- P. xixianga Xue, 1998
- P. xuei Wang & Xu, 1998
- P. yaanensis Ma, Xue & Feng, 1998
- P. yadongica Feng & Xu, 2008
- P. yaeyamensis Shinonaga, 2003
- P. yaluensis Ma, 1992
- P. yanggaoensis Ma, 1992
- P. yei Feng, 1995
- P. yinggeensis Xue, 1991
- P. yingjingensis Feng & Ma, 2002
- P. youyuensis Xue & Wang, 1989
- P. yuishanensis Shinonaga & Huang, 2007
- P. yunapicalis Fang & Fan, 1998
- P. zanclocerca Feng & Ma, 2002
- P. zhangjunyui Xue & Du, 2020
- P. zhangyeensis Ma & Wu, 1992
- P. zhougongshana Ma & Feng, 2002
- P. zinovjevi Malyanov, 1993
- P. zugmayeriae (Schnabl, 1888)
