= Phaonia jaroschewskii =

Scientific classification
- Kingdom: Animalia
- Phylum: Arthropoda
- Class: Insecta
- Order: Diptera
- Family: Muscidae
- Subfamily: Phaoniinae
- Tribe: Phaoniini
- Genus: Phaonia
- Species: P. jaroschewskii

Binomial name
- Phaonia jaroschewskii (Schnabl, 1888)

Synonyms
- Aricia jaroschewskii Schnabl, 1888; Phaonia crinipes Ringdahl, 1913

Species of fly

Phaonia jaroschewskii, the hairy canary fly, is a yellow European muscid fly. This species is found on sphagnum moss on healthy wet bog ecosystems. The larvae feed on these sphagnum bog mosses. It is of interest as an indicator of the health of these bogs, as it will disappear if the bog deteriorates. For this reason the hairy canary fly is one of the species listed in the United Kingdom Biodiversity Action Plan.
