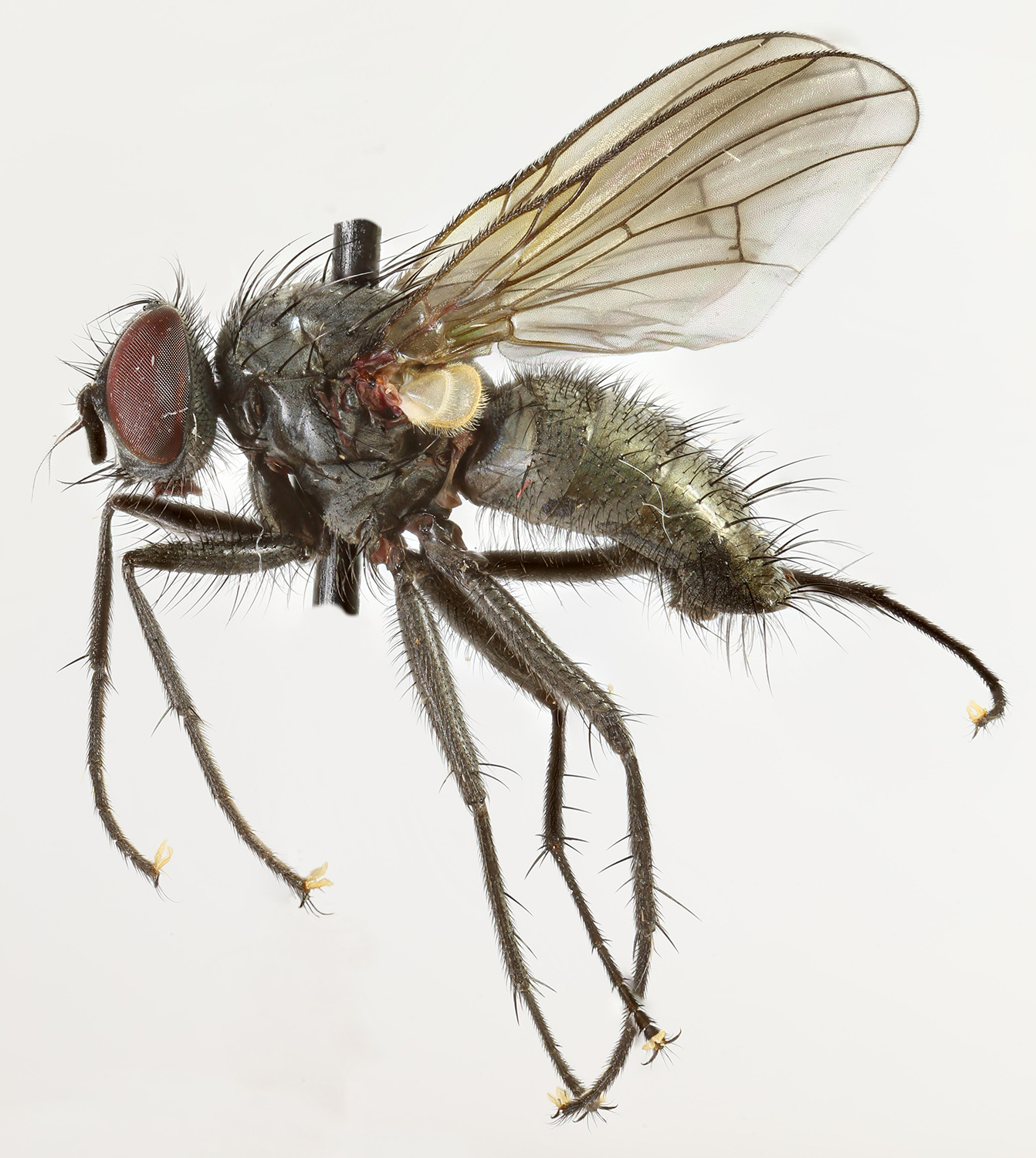
- Phaonia halterata North Wales

Scientific classification
- Kingdom: Animalia
- Phylum: Arthropoda
- Clade: Pancrustacea
- Class: Insecta
- Order: Diptera
- Family: Muscidae
- Subfamily: Phaoniinae
- Tribe: Phaoniini
- Genus: Phaonia
- Species: P. halterata

Binomial name
- Phaonia halterata (Stein, 1898)

Synonyms
- Anthomyia transversa Stephens, 1829; Spilogaster halterata Stein, 1898

= Phaonia halterata =

Species of fly

Phaonia halterata is a fly from the family Muscidae. It is found in the Palearctic.
