= Phaonia pallidosa =

Scientific classification
- Kingdom: Animalia
- Phylum: Arthropoda
- Class: Insecta
- Order: Diptera
- Family: Muscidae
- Subfamily: Phaoniinae
- Tribe: Phaoniini
- Genus: Phaonia
- Species: P. pallidosa

Binomial name
- Phaonia pallidosa Huckett, 1965

Synonyms
- Dialyta pallida Stein, 1898

Species of fly

Phaonia pallidosa is a species of fly in the family Muscidae.

== Distribution ==
Canada.
