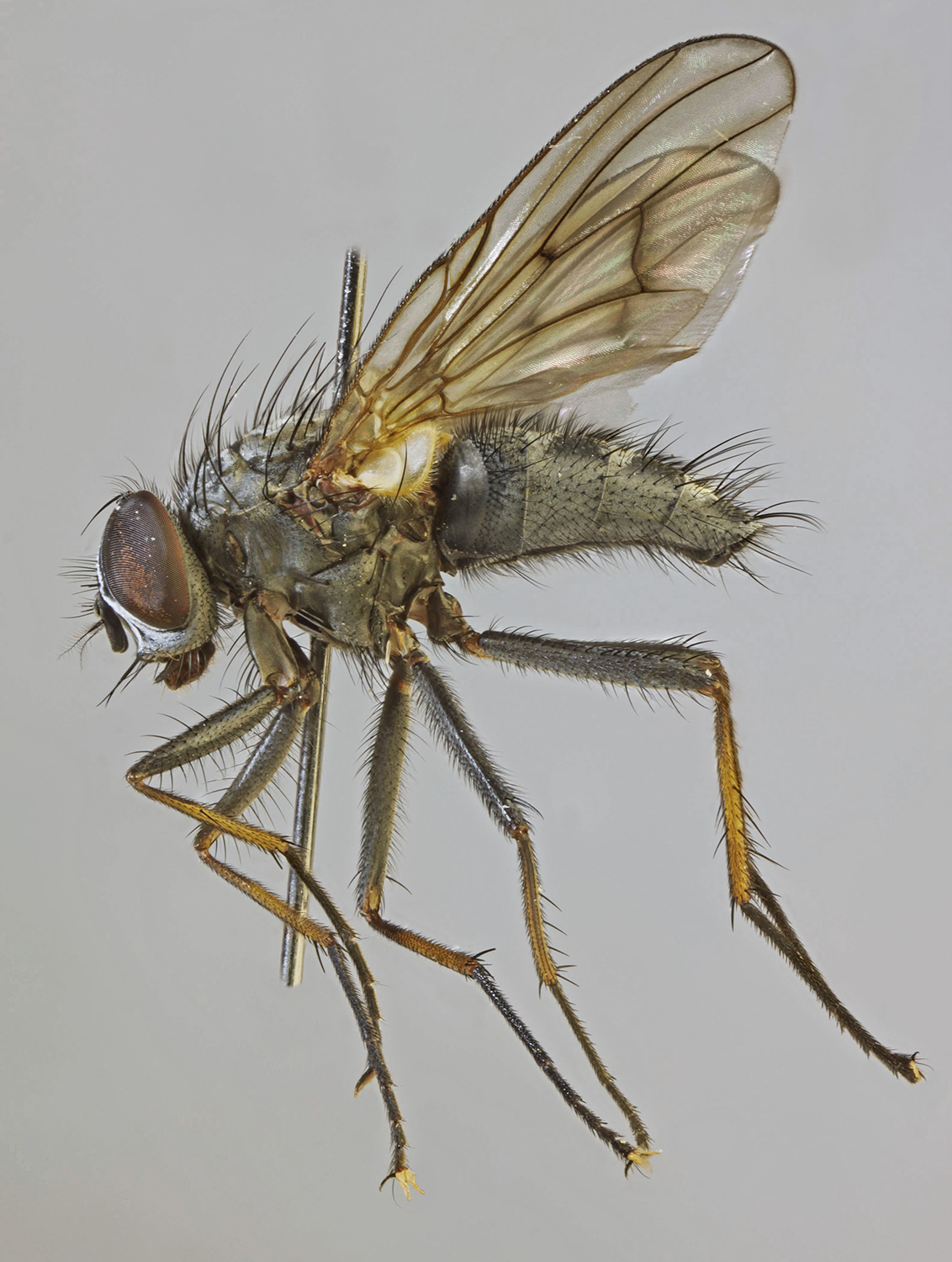

Scientific classification
- Kingdom: Animalia
- Phylum: Arthropoda
- Class: Insecta
- Order: Diptera
- Family: Muscidae
- Subfamily: Phaoniinae
- Tribe: Phaoniini
- Genus: Phaonia
- Species: P. palpata

Binomial name
- Phaonia palpata (Stein, 1897)

Synonyms
- Aricia palpata Stein, 1897

= Phaonia palpata =

Species of fly

Phaonia palpata is a species of fly which is distributed across parts of the Palaearctic.

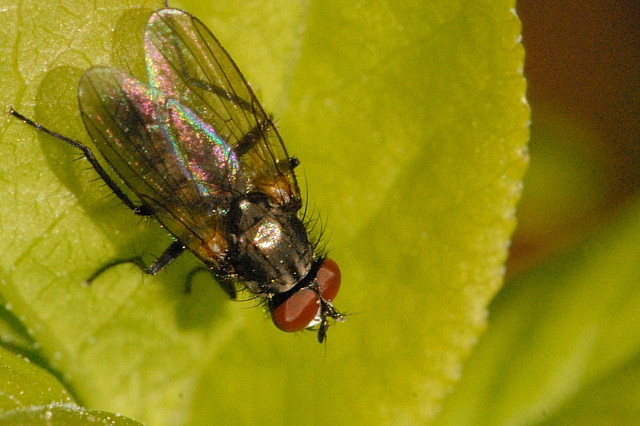
