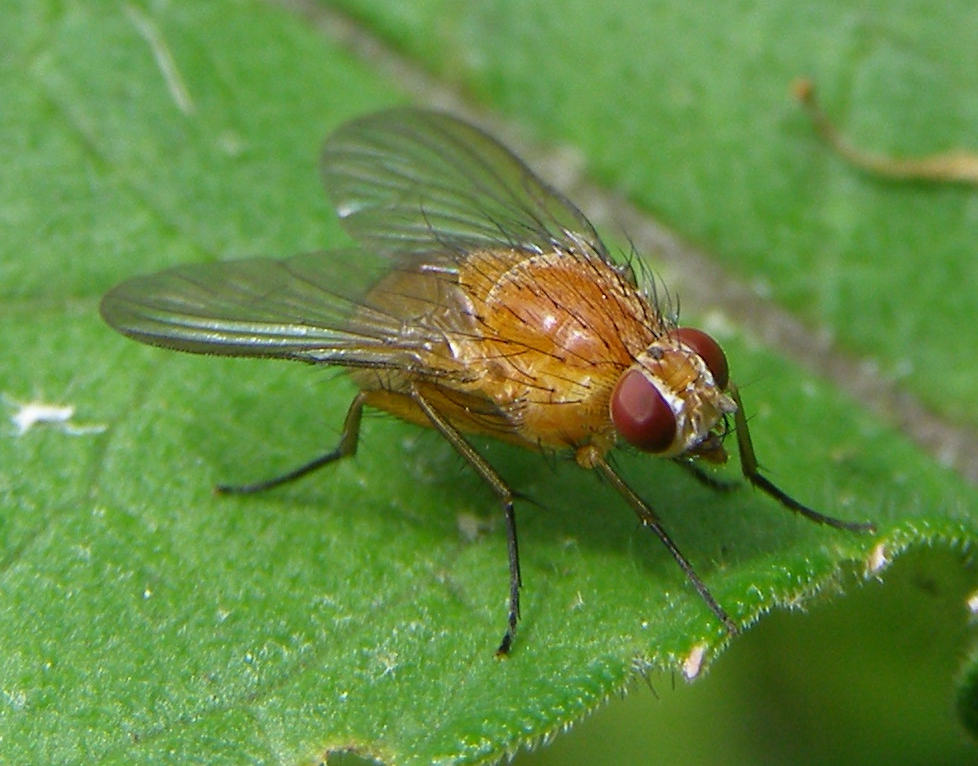
- Phaonia pallida, Female

Scientific classification
- Kingdom: Animalia
- Phylum: Arthropoda
- Class: Insecta
- Order: Diptera
- Family: Muscidae
- Subfamily: Phaoniinae
- Tribe: Phaoniini
- Genus: Phaonia
- Species: P. pallida

Binomial name
- Phaonia pallida (Fabricius, 1787)

Synonyms
- Musca pallida Fabricius, 1787; Aricia dorsalis Schnabl, 1888; Rohrella dorsalis Robineau-Desvoidy, 1830; Rohrella fragilis Robineau-Desvoidy, 1830

= Phaonia pallida =

Species of fly

Phaonia pallida, the muscid fly or orange muscid fly, is a species of fly in the family Muscidae.

== Distribution and habitat ==
This species is distributed across parts of the Palearctic – Europe (including Sicily and the Azores), Russia, and Asia (Israel, Turkey, and Iran). These flies mainly inhabit deciduous forests and woodland, especially spruce forest edge.

== Description ==
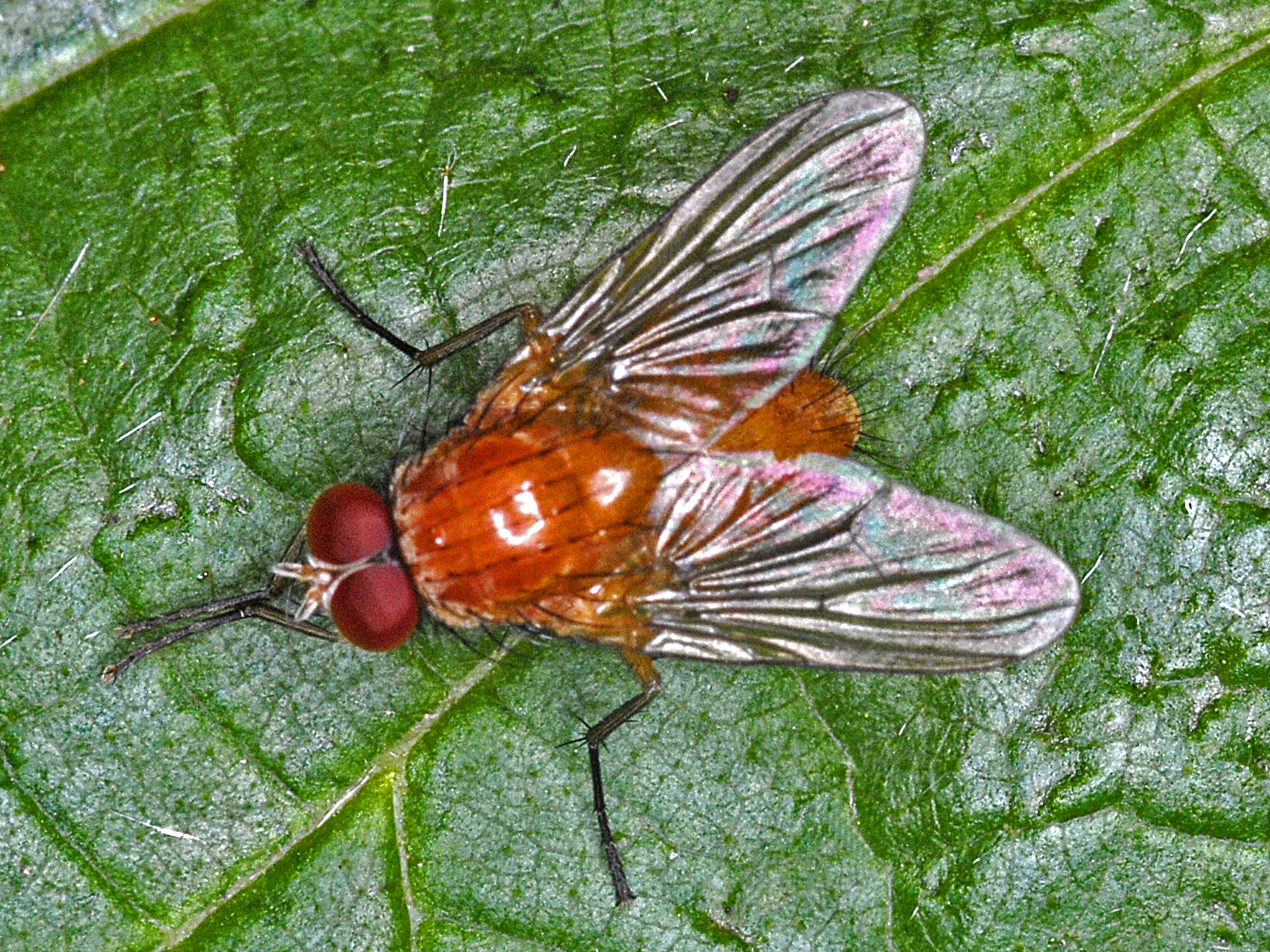
Male

Phaonia pallida can reach a length of about 5.5–7.9 millimetres (0.22–0.31 in). These flies have an orange body with a very hairy thorax. The antennae are composed by three articles and bear a feathery arista. The legs and the balancers are yellow, while the tarsi are black. The eyes are dark red, separated by a yellow marking in the females, while in males they are very close to each other.

== Biology ==
Adults fly from May to September, feeding on nectar of flowers (especially of Heracleum sphondylium). Its larvae have been found growing in various fungi (Amanita rubescens, Clitocybe nebularis, Paralepista flaccida, Hymenopellis radicata, Amanita muscaria) but also in rotten wood and under tree bark. The last larval instar of Phaonia pallida is carnivorous, feeding on small insects.

== Bibliography ==
- Chandler, Peter J. (2010). A Dipterist's Handbook (2nd Edition). The Amateur Entomologist. 15. Orpington, Kent, England: Amateur Entomologists' Society. pp. 525pp
- D'Assis Fonseca, E.C.M (1968). Diptera Cyclorrhapha Calyptrata: Muscidae. Handbooks for the Identification of British Insects. 10. London.: Royal Entomological Society of London. pp. 118pp.
- Gregor, F.; Rozkosny, R.; Bartak, M.; Vanhara, J. (2002). The Muscidae (Diptera) of Central Europe. Scientiarum Naturalium Universitatis Masarykianae Brunensis. 107. Masaryk.: Masaryk University. pp. 280pp.
