= Phaonia caerulescens =

Scientific classification
- Kingdom: Animalia
- Phylum: Arthropoda
- Class: Insecta
- Order: Diptera
- Family: Muscidae
- Subfamily: Phaoniinae
- Tribe: Phaoniini
- Genus: Phaonia
- Species: P. caerulescens

Binomial name
- Phaonia caerulescens (Stein, 1898)

Synonyms
- Aricia caerulescens Stein, 1898

Species of fly

Phaonia caerulescens is a species of fly in the family Muscidae.

== Distribution ==
Canada, United States.
