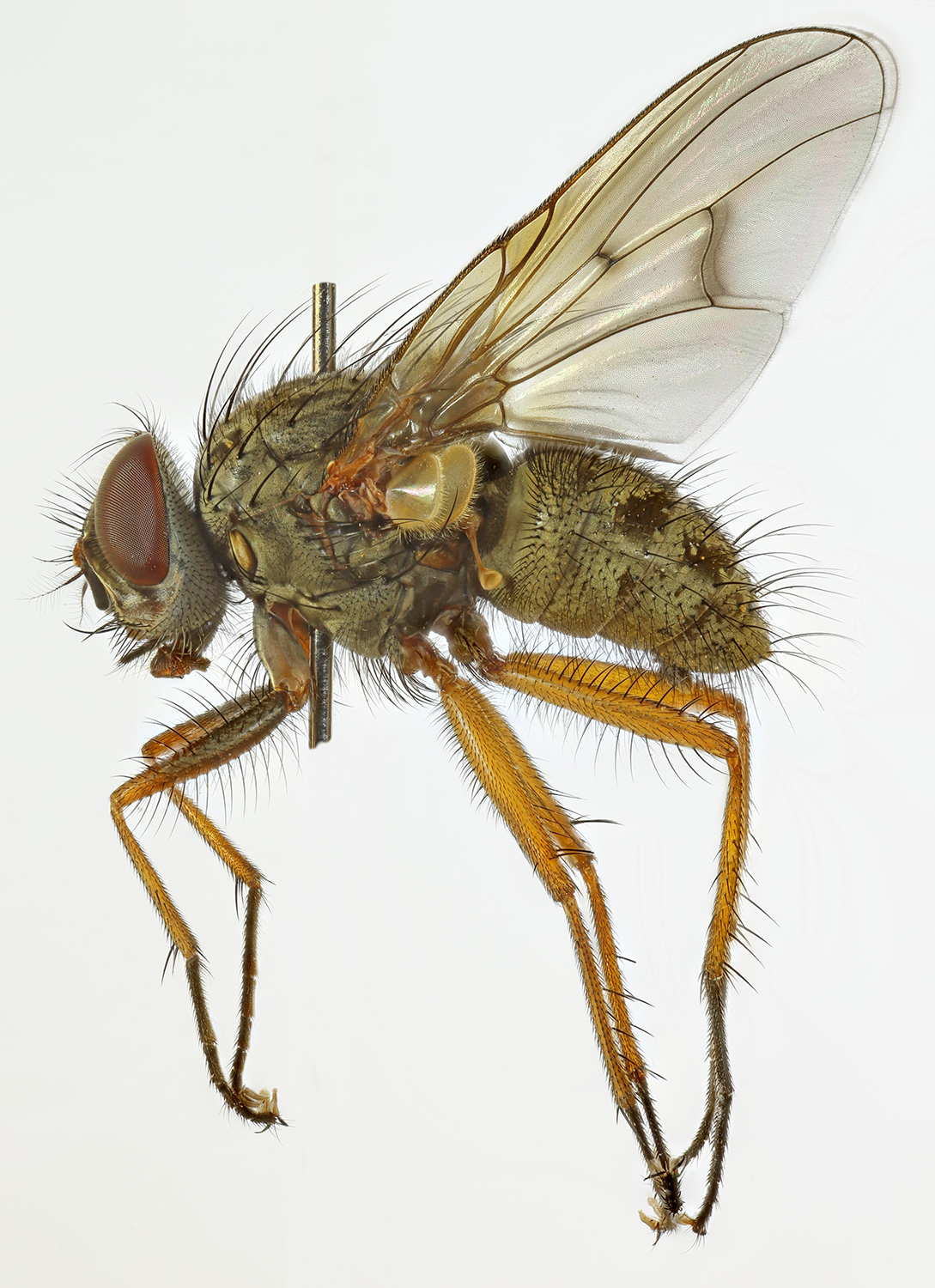
- Phaonia tuguriorum North Wales

Scientific classification
- Kingdom: Animalia
- Phylum: Arthropoda
- Clade: Pancrustacea
- Class: Insecta
- Order: Diptera
- Family: Muscidae
- Subfamily: Phaoniinae
- Tribe: Phaoniini
- Genus: Phaonia
- Species: P. tuguriorum

Binomial name
- Phaonia tuguriorum (Scopoli, 1763)

Synonyms
- Anthomyia signata Meigen, 1826; Musca extranea Stephens, 1829; Musca tuguriorum Scopoli, 1763; Phaonia extranea (Stephens, 1829); Phaonia signata (Meigen, 1826)

= Phaonia tuguriorum =

Species of fly

Phaonia tuguriorum is a species of fly which is distributed across parts the Palaearctic.

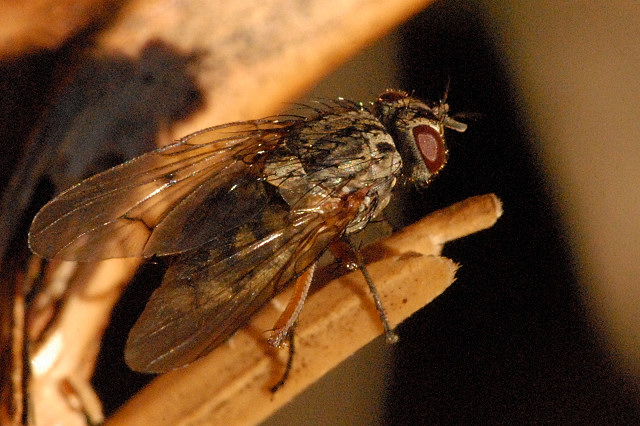

●Other possible spices are under research as of August 2026
