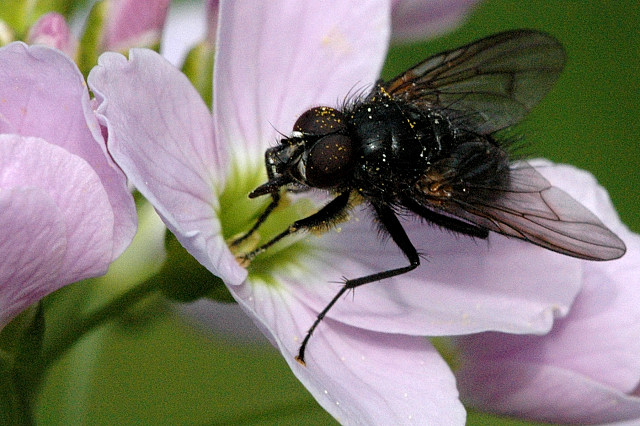

Scientific classification
- Kingdom: Animalia
- Phylum: Arthropoda
- Class: Insecta
- Order: Diptera
- Family: Muscidae
- Subfamily: Phaoniinae
- Tribe: Phaoniini
- Genus: Phaonia
- Species: P. lugubris

Binomial name
- Phaonia lugubris (Meigen, 1826)

Synonyms
- Anthomyia lugubris Meigen, 1826; Aricia morio Zetterstedt, 1845; Phaonia morio (Zetterstedt, 1845)

= Phaonia lugubris =

Species of fly

Phaonia lugubris is a species of fly which is distribution across parts the Palaearctic.
