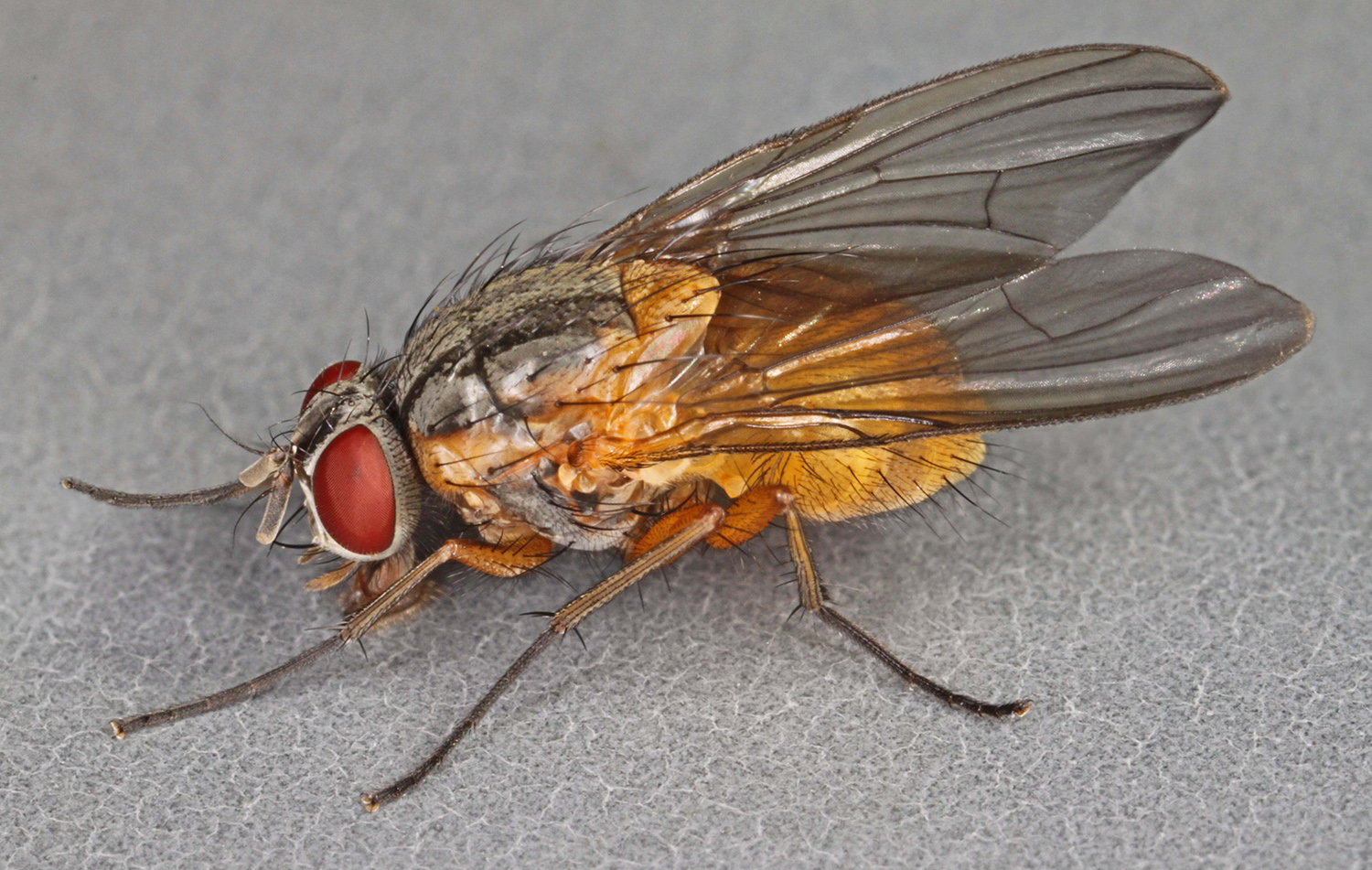
- Phaonia rufiventris North Wales

Scientific classification
- Kingdom: Animalia
- Phylum: Arthropoda
- Clade: Pancrustacea
- Class: Insecta
- Order: Diptera
- Family: Muscidae
- Subfamily: Phaoniinae
- Tribe: Phaoniini
- Genus: Phaonia
- Species: P. rufiventris

Binomial name
- Phaonia rufiventris (Scopoli, 1763)

Synonyms
- Musca rufiventris Scopoli, 1763; Musca nugater Harris, 1780; Musca nugator Harris, 1780; Musca testacea Fabricius, 1781; Musca scutellaris Fallén, 1825; Anthomyia populi Meigen, 1826; Rohrella humeralis Robineau-Desvoidy, 1830; Yetodesia stolata Rondani, 1866

= Phaonia rufiventris =

Species of fly

Phaonia rufiventris is a fly from the family Muscidae. It is found in the Palearctic.

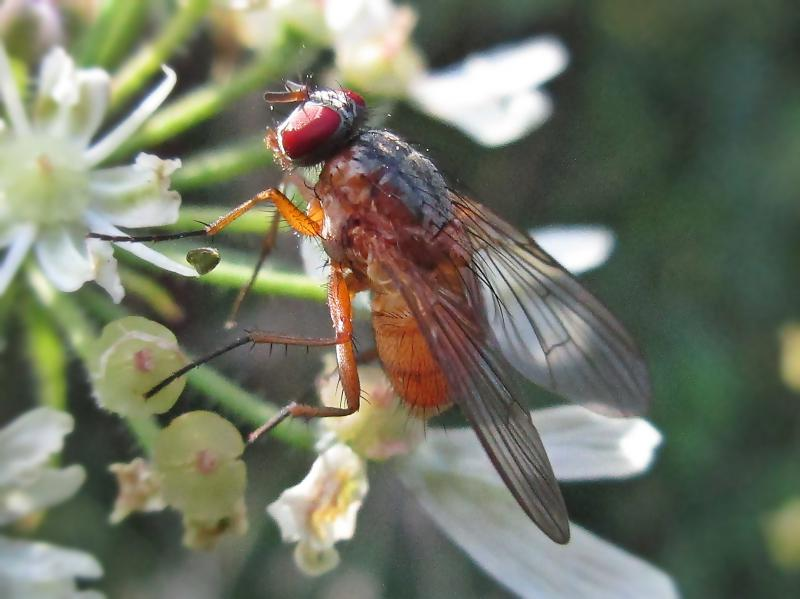
Female.Netherlands

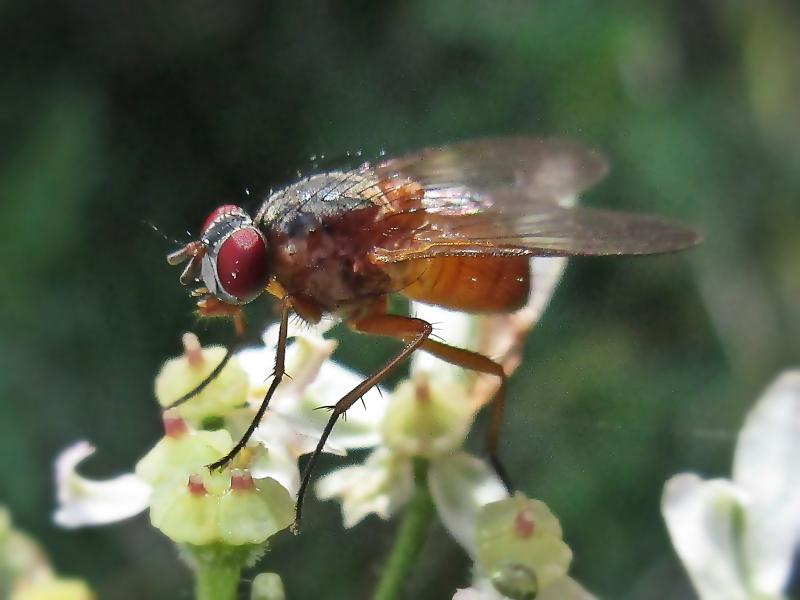
Female.Netherlands
