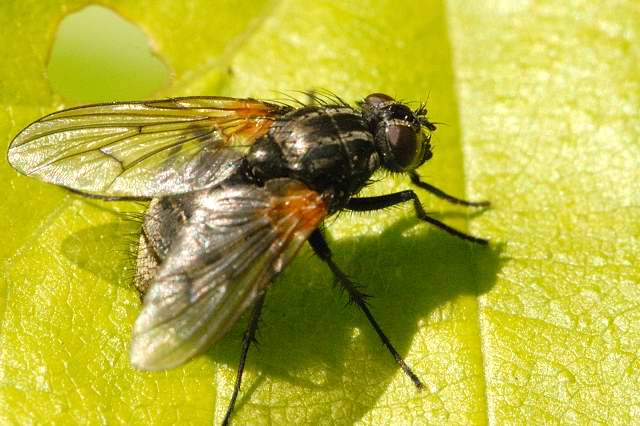
- Phaonia consobrina, female

Scientific classification
- Kingdom: Animalia
- Phylum: Arthropoda
- Class: Insecta
- Order: Diptera
- Family: Muscidae
- Subfamily: Phaoniinae
- Tribe: Phaoniini
- Genus: Phaonia
- Species: P. consobrina

Binomial name
- Phaonia consobrina (Zetterstedt, 1838)

Synonyms
- Anthomyza consobrina Zetterstedt, 1838

= Phaonia consobrina =

Species of fly

Phaonia consobrina is a species of fly which is widely distributed across the Palaearctic.
