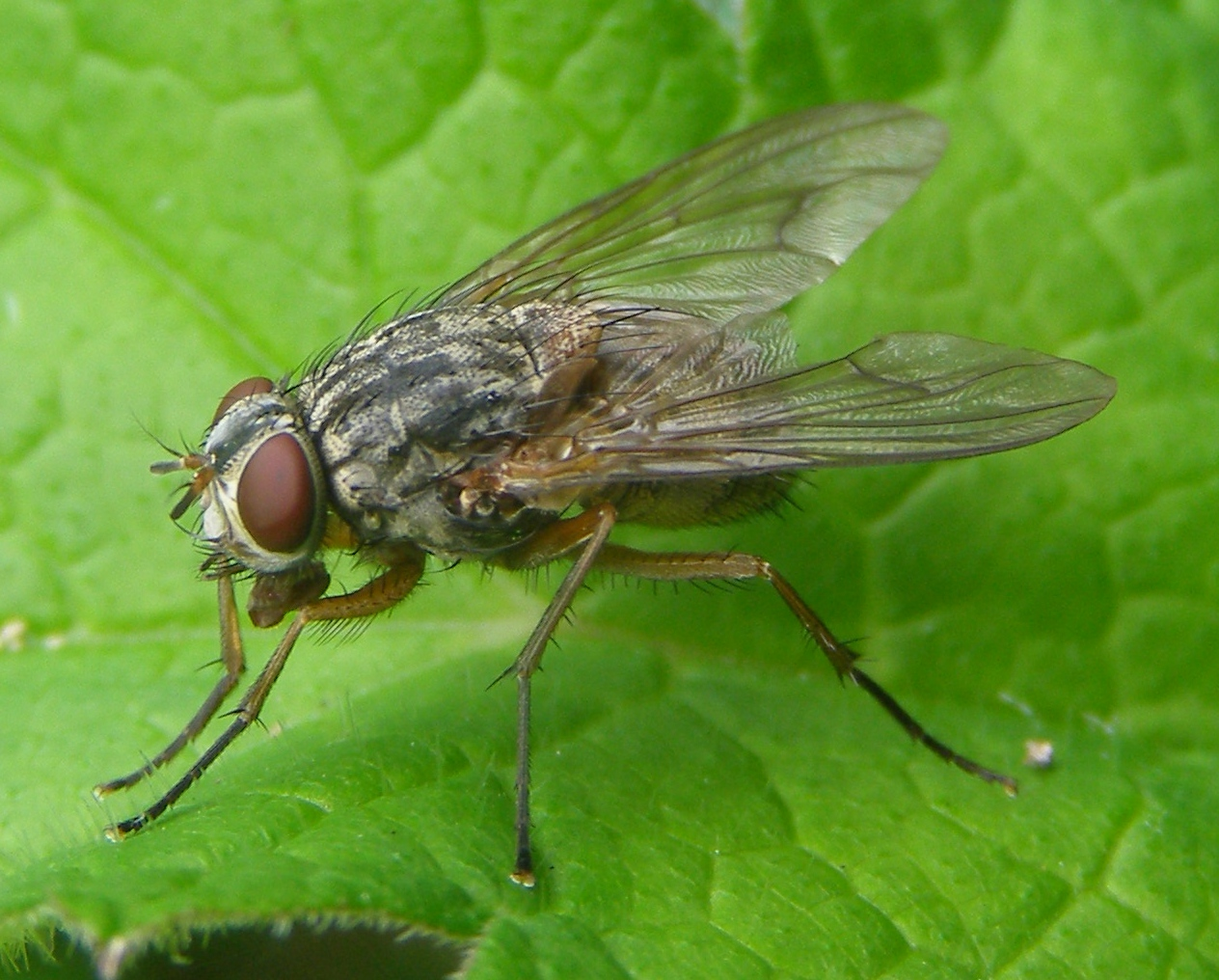
- A female Phaonia valida

Scientific classification
- Kingdom: Animalia
- Phylum: Arthropoda
- Class: Insecta
- Order: Diptera
- Family: Muscidae
- Subfamily: Phaoniinae
- Tribe: Phaoniini
- Genus: Phaonia
- Species: P. valida

Binomial name
- Phaonia valida (Harris, 1780)

Synonyms
- Musca valida Harris, 1780; Phaonia viarum (Robineau-Desvoidy, 1830)

= Phaonia valida =

Species of fly

Phaonia valida is a species of fly. It is the type species of the genus Phaonia.

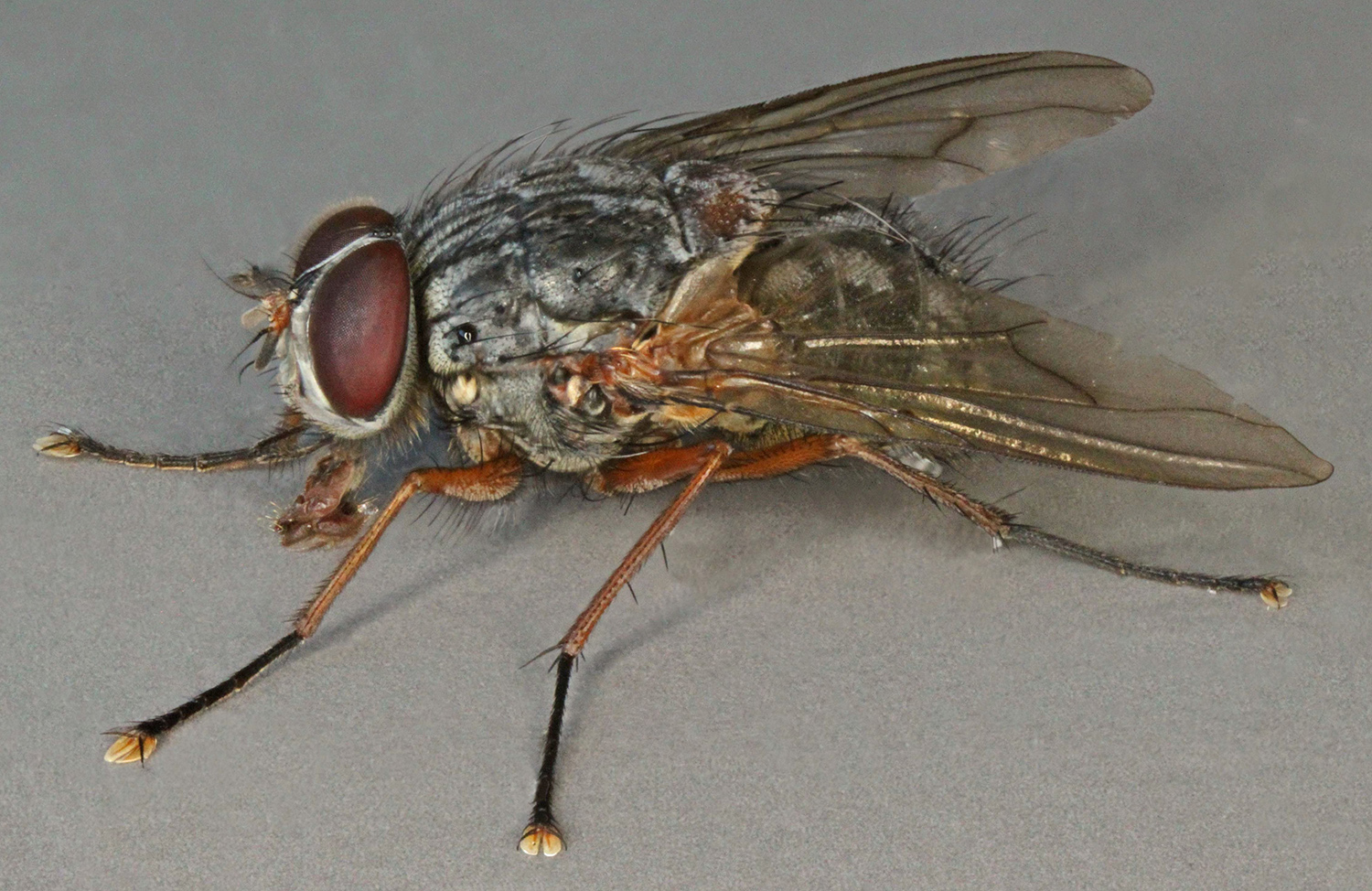
Phaonia valida male
