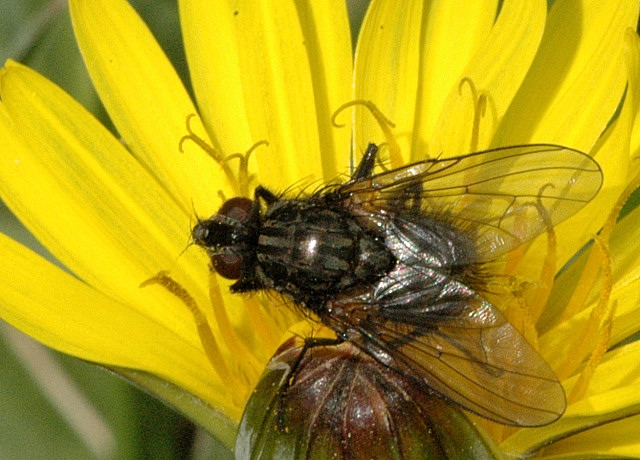

Scientific classification
- Kingdom: Animalia
- Phylum: Arthropoda
- Class: Insecta
- Order: Diptera
- Family: Muscidae
- Subfamily: Phaoniinae
- Tribe: Phaoniini
- Genus: Phaonia
- Species: P. perdita

Binomial name
- Phaonia perdita (Meigen, 1830)

Synonyms
- Anthomyia femorata Stephens, 1829; Anthomyia perdita Meigen, 1830; Phaonia femorata (Stephens, 1829)

= Phaonia perdita =

Species of fly

Phaonia perdita is a species of fly which is distribution across parts the Palaearctic.
