= Phaonia rufipalpis =

Scientific classification
- Kingdom: Animalia
- Phylum: Arthropoda
- Class: Insecta
- Order: Diptera
- Family: Muscidae
- Subfamily: Phaoniinae
- Tribe: Phaoniini
- Genus: Phaonia
- Species: P. rufipalpis

Binomial name
- Phaonia rufipalpis (Macquart, 1835)

Synonyms
- Aricia rufipalpis Macquart, 1835

Species of fly

Phaonia rufipalpis is a species of fly. Found in palaearctic Europe, it lives in deciduous woodlands of temperate regions.
