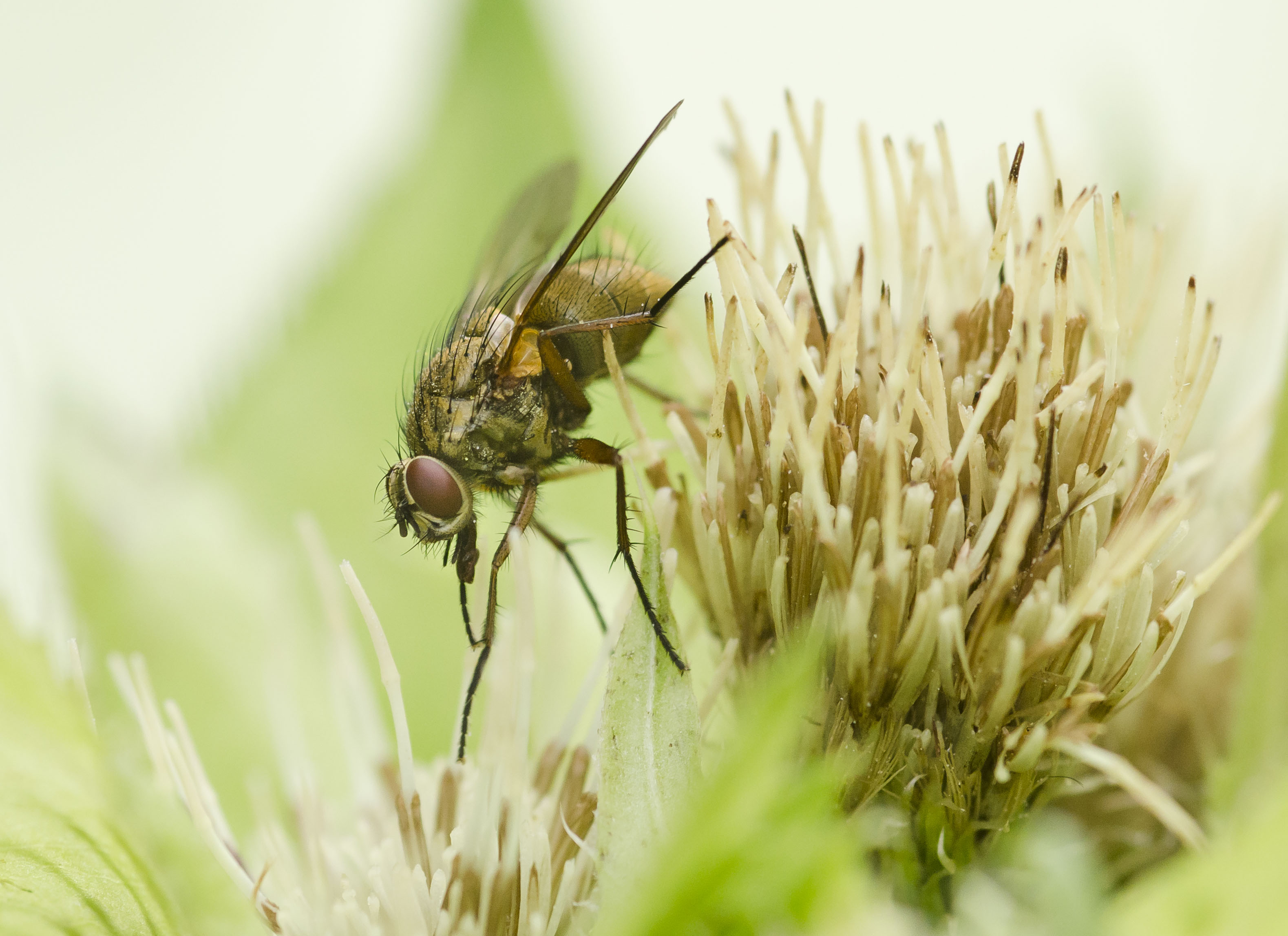
- Phaonia angelicae, female

Scientific classification
- Kingdom: Animalia
- Phylum: Arthropoda
- Class: Insecta
- Order: Diptera
- Family: Muscidae
- Subfamily: Phaoniinae
- Tribe: Phaoniini
- Genus: Phaonia
- Species: P. angelicae

Binomial name
- Phaonia angelicae (Scopoli, 1763)

Synonyms
- Anthomyia defecta Walker, 1853; Anthomyza basalis Zetterstedt, 1838; Musca angelicae Scopoli, 1763; Phaonia basalis (Zetterstedt, 1838); Phaonia defecta (Walker, 1853)

= Phaonia angelicae =

Species of fly

Phaonia angelicae is a species of fly which is widely distributed across the Palaearctic.

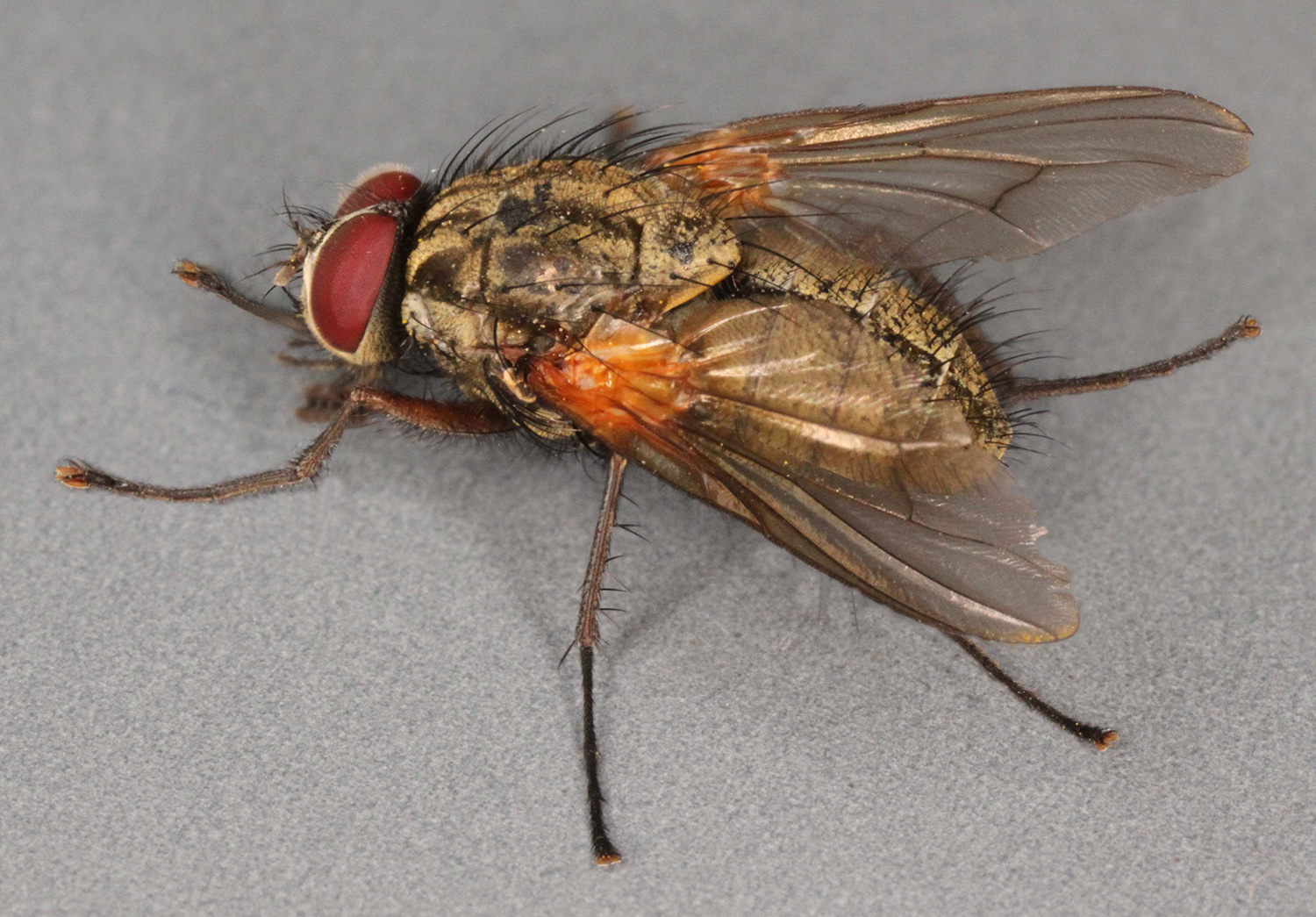
Phaonia angelicae male
