= Phaonia cincta =

Scientific classification
- Kingdom: Animalia
- Phylum: Arthropoda
- Clade: Pancrustacea
- Class: Insecta
- Order: Diptera
- Family: Muscidae
- Subfamily: Phaoniinae
- Tribe: Phaoniini
- Genus: Phaonia
- Species: P. cincta

Binomial name
- Phaonia cincta (Zetterstedt, 1846)

Synonyms
- Anthomyza cincta Zetterstedt, 1846

Species of fly

Phaonia cincta is a species of fly which is widely distribution across the Palaearctic.
