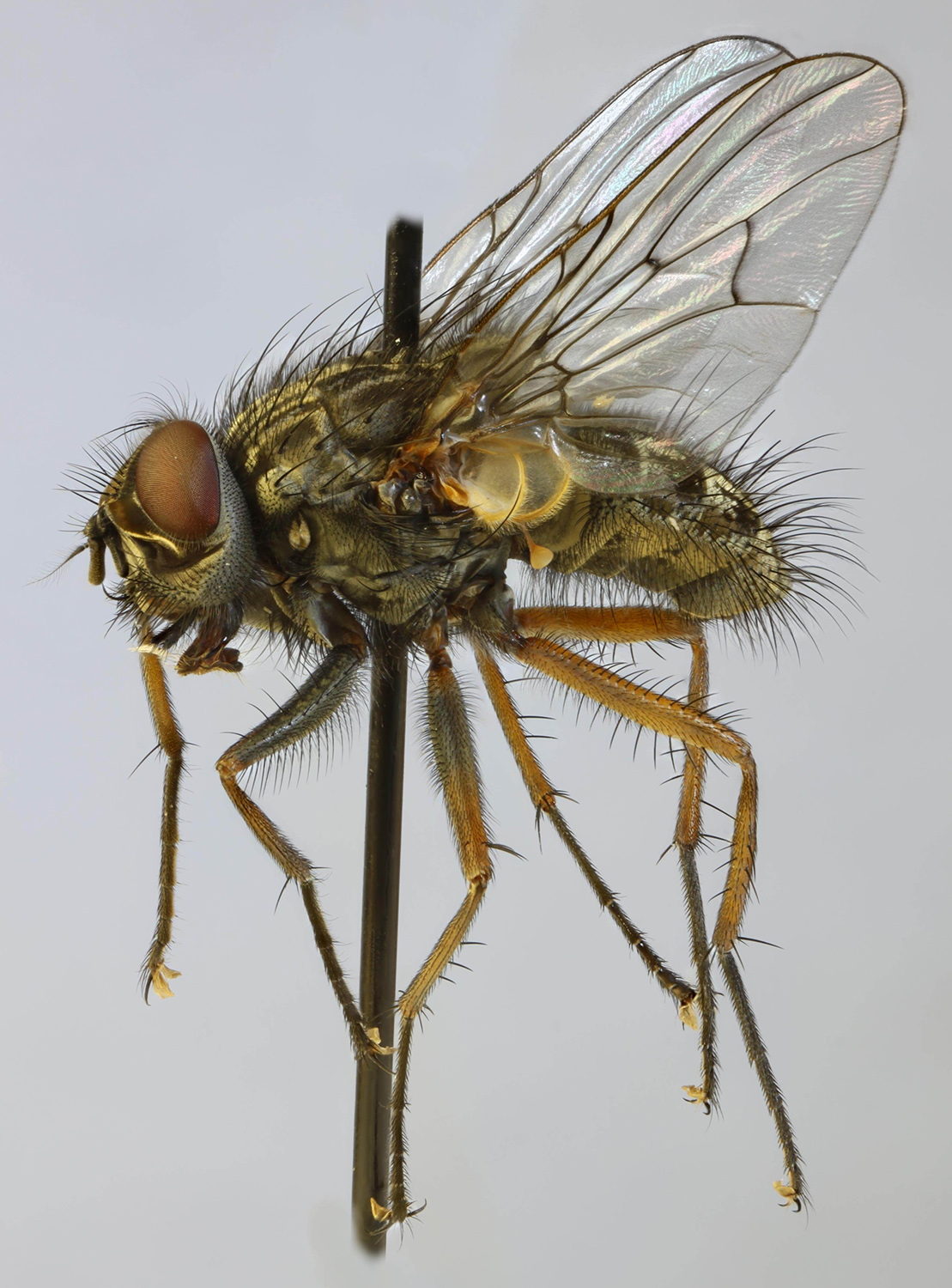
- Phaonia errans North Wales

Scientific classification
- Kingdom: Animalia
- Phylum: Arthropoda
- Clade: Pancrustacea
- Class: Insecta
- Order: Diptera
- Family: Muscidae
- Subfamily: Phaoniinae
- Tribe: Phaoniini
- Genus: Phaonia
- Species: P. errans

Binomial name
- Phaonia errans (Meigen, 1826)

= Phaonia errans =

Species of fly

Phaonia errans is a fly from the family Muscidae. It is found in the Palearctic.
