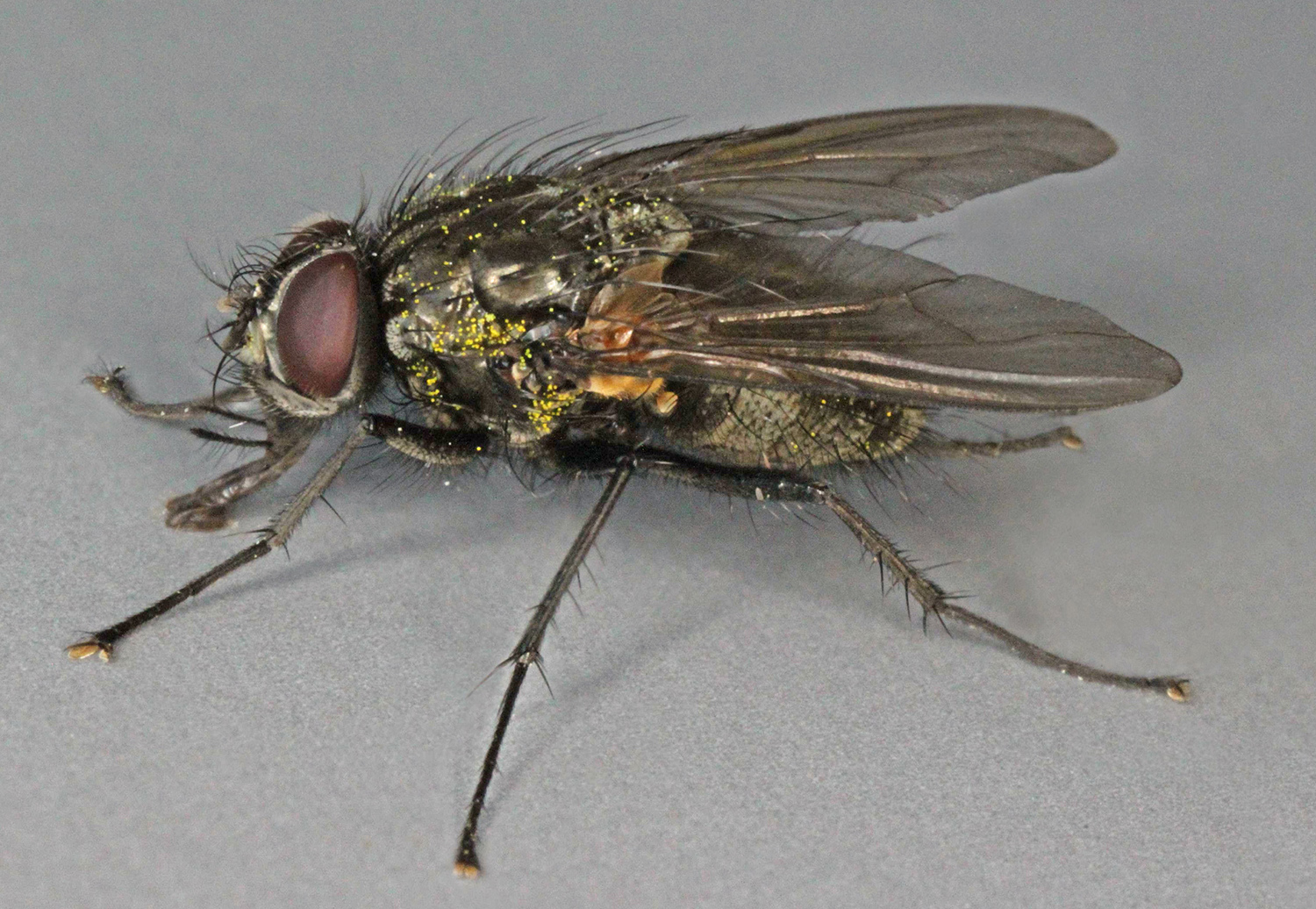
- Phaonia incana North Wales

Scientific classification
- Kingdom: Animalia
- Phylum: Arthropoda
- Clade: Pancrustacea
- Class: Insecta
- Order: Diptera
- Family: Muscidae
- Subfamily: Phaoniinae
- Tribe: Phaoniini
- Genus: Phaonia
- Species: P. incana

Binomial name
- Phaonia incana (Wiedemann, 1817)

Synonyms
- Anthomyia incana Wiedemann, 1817; Musca nemorum Fallén, 1823; Anthomyia plumbea Meigen, 1826; Fellaea nigripes Robineau-Desvoidy, 1830; Anthomyia indecisa Walker, 1853

= Phaonia incana =

Species of fly

Phaonia incana is a fly from the family Muscidae. It is found in the Palearctic.
