= Phaonia apicata =

Scientific classification
- Kingdom: Animalia
- Phylum: Arthropoda
- Class: Insecta
- Order: Diptera
- Family: Muscidae
- Subfamily: Phaoniinae
- Tribe: Phaoniini
- Genus: Phaonia
- Species: P. apicata

Binomial name
- Phaonia apicata Johannsen, 1916

Species of fly

Phaonia apicata is a species of house flies, etc. in the family Muscidae.

== Distribution ==
Canada, United States.
