= Phaonia peregrinans =

Scientific classification
- Kingdom: Animalia
- Phylum: Arthropoda
- Class: Insecta
- Order: Diptera
- Family: Muscidae
- Subfamily: Phaoniinae
- Tribe: Phaoniini
- Genus: Phaonia
- Species: P. peregrinans

Binomial name
- Phaonia peregrinans Huckett, 1965

Species of fly

Phaonia peregrinans is a species of fly in the family Muscidae.

== Distribution ==
United States.
