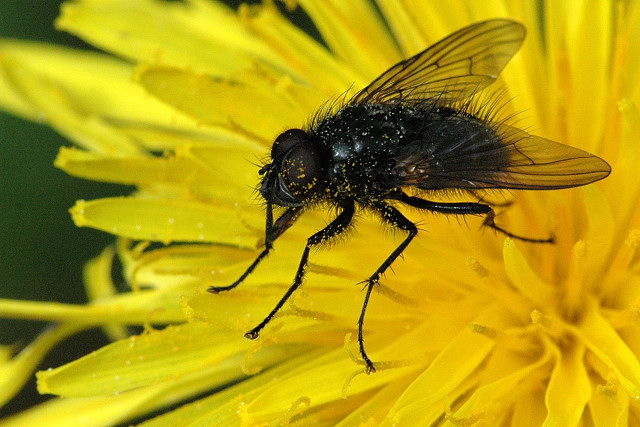

Scientific classification
- Kingdom: Animalia
- Phylum: Arthropoda
- Class: Insecta
- Order: Diptera
- Family: Muscidae
- Subfamily: Phaoniinae
- Tribe: Phaoniini
- Genus: Phaonia
- Species: P. atriceps

Binomial name
- Phaonia atriceps (Loew, 1858)

Synonyms
- Dialyta atriceps Loew, 1858

= Phaonia atriceps =

Species of fly

Phaonia atriceps is a species of fly which is widely distribution across the Palaearctic.
