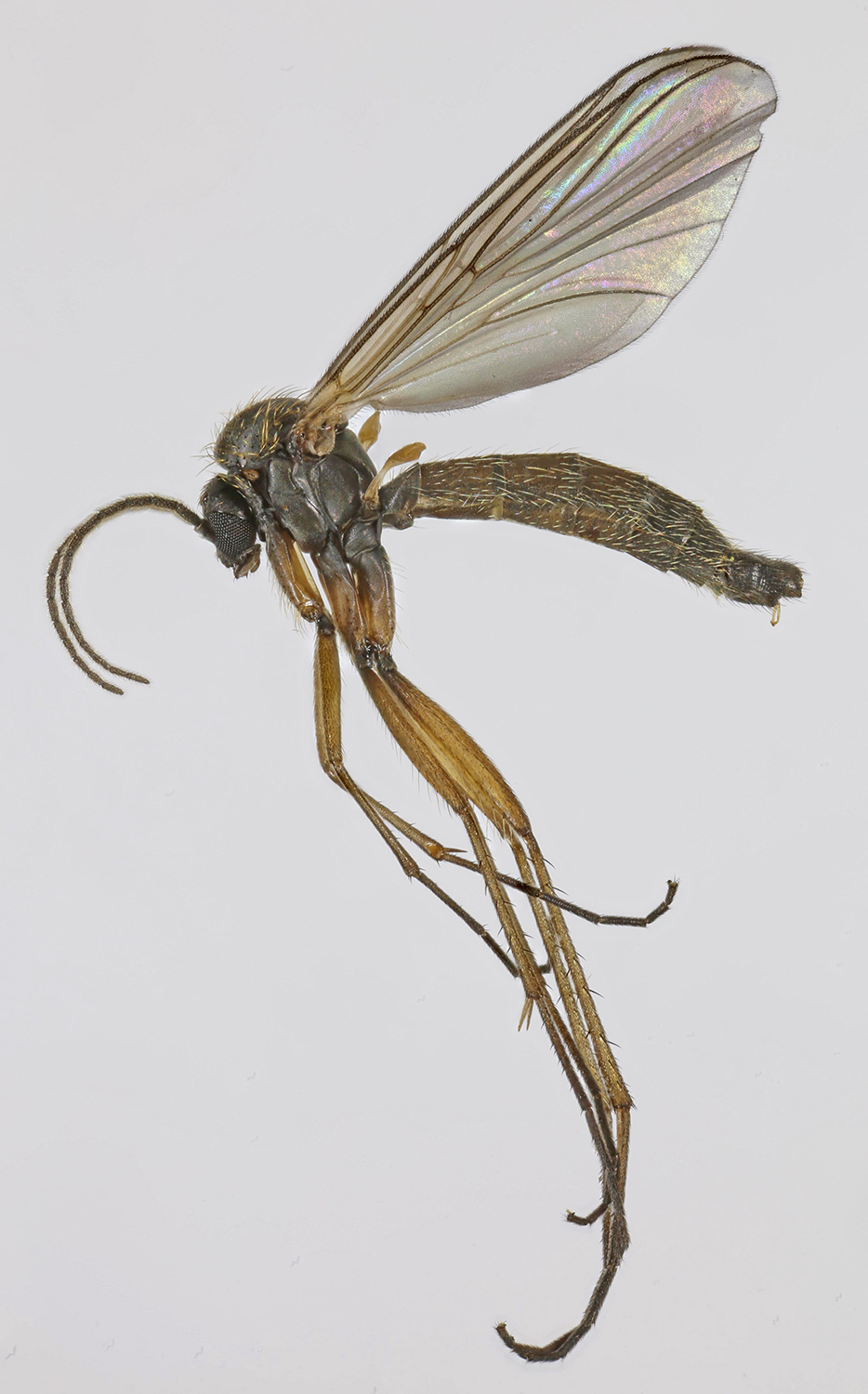
- Boletina gripha North Wales

Scientific classification
- Kingdom: Animalia
- Phylum: Arthropoda
- Class: Insecta
- Order: Diptera
- Family: Mycetophilidae
- Genus: Boletina
- Species: B. gripha

Binomial name
- Boletina gripha Dziedzicki, 1885

= Boletina gripha =

Species of fly

Boletina gripha is a Palearctic species of 'fungus gnats' in the family Mycetophilidae. It is found in a wide variety of habitats from wooded streams to wetlands and open moorland. Reared from brown rot of spruce stump, spruce log bearing loose bark and decaying wood of pine. Larvae have been on the surface of decaying wood (white rot) covered with Resinicium bicolor, from soil in pine forest and from fruiting bodies of Suillus bovinus.

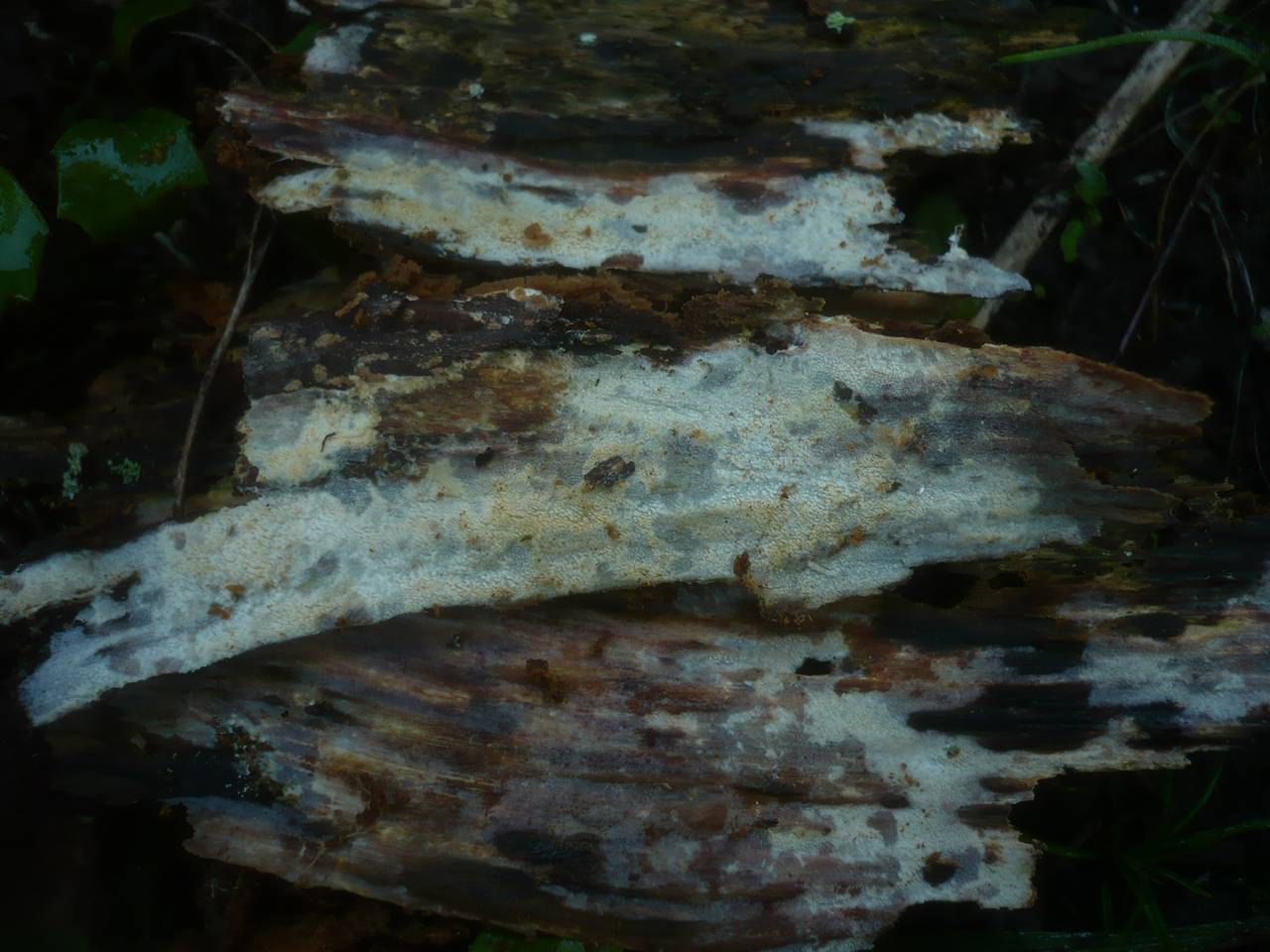
Resinicium bicolor
