= Steleoneura =

Scientific classification
- Kingdom: Animalia
- Phylum: Arthropoda
- Class: Insecta
- Order: Diptera
- Family: Tachinidae
- Subfamily: Exoristinae
- Tribe: Blondeliini
- Genus: Steleoneura; Stein, 1924

Type species
- Steleoneura czernyi Stein, 1924

Synonyms
- Villeneuvenia Jacentkovsky, 1937; Embiomyia Aldrich, 1934; Steloneura Yang & Chao, 1990

Genus of flies

Steleoneura is a genus of tachinid flies in the family Tachinidae.

== Species ==
- Steleoneura australis (Aldrich, 1934)
- Steleoneura czernyi Stein, 1924
- Steleoneura minuta Yang & Chao, 1990
- Steleoneura novemmaculata Wood, 1985
