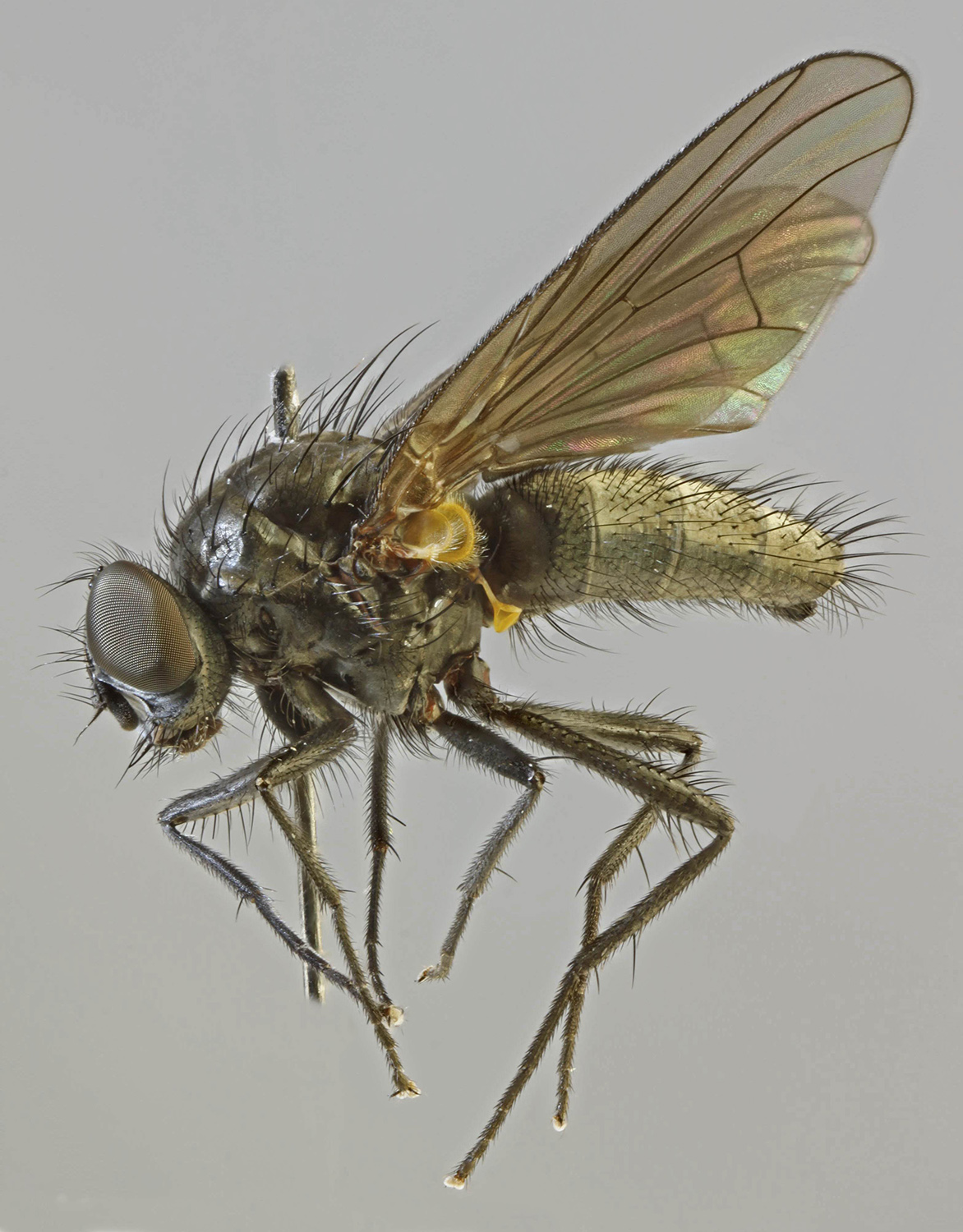
- Lophosceles cinereiventris

Scientific classification
- Kingdom: Animalia
- Phylum: Arthropoda
- Clade: Pancrustacea
- Class: Insecta
- Order: Diptera
- Family: Muscidae
- Subfamily: Phaoniinae
- Tribe: Phaoniini
- Genus: Lophosceles; Ringdahl, 1922

= Lophosceles =

Genus of flies

Lophosceles is a small genus from the fly family Muscidae.

== Species ==
- Lophosceles alaskensis (Malloch, 1923)
- Lophosceles cinereiventris (Zetterstedt, 1845)
- Lophosceles frenatus (Holmgren, 1872)
- Lophosceles hians Zetterstedt, 1838
- Lophosceles minimus (Malloch, 1919)
- Lophosceles mutatus (Fallén, 1825)
