= Steleoneura czernyi =

Scientific classification
- Kingdom: Animalia
- Phylum: Arthropoda
- Class: Insecta
- Order: Diptera
- Family: Tachinidae
- Subfamily: Exoristinae
- Tribe: Blondeliini
- Genus: Steleoneura
- Species: S. czernyi

Binomial name
- Steleoneura czernyi Stein, 1924

Synonyms
- Tachina sexmaculata Mesnil, 1962

Species of fly

Steleoneura czernyi is a species of fly in the family Tachinidae.

== Distribution ==
Tajikistan, Bulgaria, Italy, Spain, France, Israel, Mongolia, Canary Islands, Transcaucasia.
