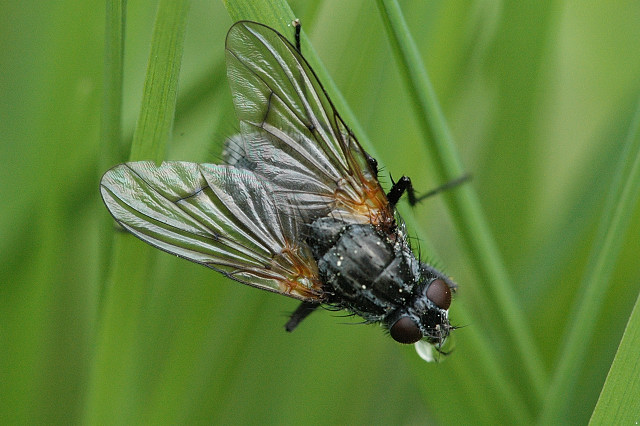
- Phaonia scutellata, female

Scientific classification
- Kingdom: Animalia
- Phylum: Arthropoda
- Class: Insecta
- Order: Diptera
- Family: Muscidae
- Subfamily: Phaoniinae
- Tribe: Phaoniini
- Genus: Phaonia
- Species: P. scutellata

Binomial name
- Phaonia scutellata (Zetterstedt, 1845)

Synonyms
- Anthomyza scutellata Zetterstedt, 1845

= Phaonia scutellata =

Species of fly

Phaonia scutellata is a species of fly which has a distribution across parts the Palaearctic.
