= Theodor Becker =

Danish-German civil engineer and entomologist (1840–1928)

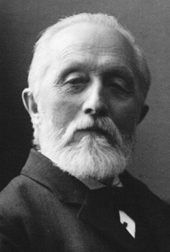
Theodor Becker

Theodor Becker (23 June 1840 in Plön – 30 June 1928 in Liegnitz) was a Danish-born German civil engineer and entomologist primarily known for studies on the taxonomy of flies.

He worked with Paul Stein, Mario Bezzi, and Kálmán Kertész on Katalog der Paläarktischen dipteren published in Budapest from 1903.

== Selected works ==
- 1902. Die Meigenschen Typen der sog. Musciden Acalyptratae (Muscaria, Holometopa).Zeitschrift für systematische Hymenopterologie und Dipterologie 2: 209–256, 289–320, 337–349.
- 1903. Die Typen der v. Roser’schen Dipteren-Sammlung in Stuttgart. Diptera Cyclorrhapha Schizophora. Jahreshefte des Vereins für Vaterländische Naturkunde in Württemberg 59: 52–66.
- 1903. Aegyptische Dipteren gesammelt und beschrieben (Fortsetzung und Schluss).Mitteilungen aus dem zoologischen Museum in Berlin 2(3): 67-192.
- 1905. Cyclorrhapha Schizophora: Holometopa. In Becker, T., Bezzi, M., Kertész, K.& Stein, P. (eds): Katalog der paläarktischen Dipteren. Vol. 4, 272 pp., G. Wesselényi in Hódmezövásárhely, Budapest.Bibliography 330
- 1907 Zur Kenntnis der Dipteren von Zentral Asien. - I. Cyclorrhapha Schizophora, Holometopa und Orthorrhapha Brachycera. Annuaire du Musée Zoologique de l.Académie Impériale des Sciences de St.-Pétersbourg 12: 253–317.
- 1907 Die Ergebnisse meiner dipterologischen Frühjahrsreise nach Algier und Tunis 1906. Zeitschrift für systematische Hymenopterologie und Dipterologie 7: 369–407.
- 1907. Ein Beitrag zur Kenntnis der Dipterenfauna Nordsibiriens. Résultats scientifiques de l’Expédition polaire Russe en 1900–1903, sous la direction du Baron E. Toll. Section E: Zoologie. Volume I. Livr.10. Mémoires de l.Académie Impériale des Sciences de St. Pétersbourg, VIII Série, Classe Physico-Mathématique 18(10): 1–6.
- 1908. Dipteren der Kanarischen Inseln. Mitteilungen aus dem zoologischen Museum in Berlin 4(1): 1–180.
- 1908. Dipteren der Insel Madeira. Mitteilungen aus dem zoologischen Museum in Berlin 4(1): 181–206.
- 1909. Collectionis recueillis par M. Maurice de Rothschild dans l’Afrique orientale anglaise. Insectes: Diptères nouveaux. Bulletin du Muséum National d.Histoire Naturelle, Paris 15: 113–121.
- 1910. Voyage de M. Maurice de Rothschild en Éthiopie et dans l’Afrique orientale(1904-1906). Diptères nouveaux. Annales de la Société Entomologique de France 79: 22–30.
- 1910. Dipteren aus Südarabien und von der Insel Sokótra. Denkschriften der Kaiserlichen Akademie der Wissenschaften, Wien, Mathematisch-Naturwissenschaftliche Klasse,71: 1-30.
- 1910. Dipterologische Sammelreise nach Korsika (Dipt.). I. Orthorrhapha brachycera.Deutsche Entomologische Zeitschrift 6: 635–665.
- 1910. 1910 Chloropidae. Eine monographische Studie. Archivum Zoologicum Budapest 1:23-174
- 1913. Dipteren aus Marokko. Annuaire du Musée Zoologique de l.Académie Impériale de Sciences de St.-Pétersbourg 18: 62–95.
- 1916. Fauna Faeröensis. Orthorrhapha Brachycera, Cyclorrhapha aschiza und Schizophora (excl. Anthomyiinae). Zoologische Jahrbücher, Abteilung für Systematik, Geographie und Biologie der Tiere, Jena 39:121-134.
- 1920. Diptères brachycères. Mission du Service Géographique de l.Armée pour la mesure d.un arc de Méridien Equatorial en Amérique du Sud, 1899–1906, 10(1919)(2):163-215.
- 1922. Diptères. In: Extrait du voyage de M. le Baron Maurice de Rothschild en Éthiopie et en Afrique Orientale Anglaise (1904-1905). pp. 796–836, Imprimerie Nationale, Paris.
- 1922. Dipterologische Studien - Dolichopodidae der Indo-Australischen Region. Capita Zoologica, 1(4): 1–247, plates I–XIX.

== Collection ==
Becker's collection is in the Natural History Museum of Berlin.
