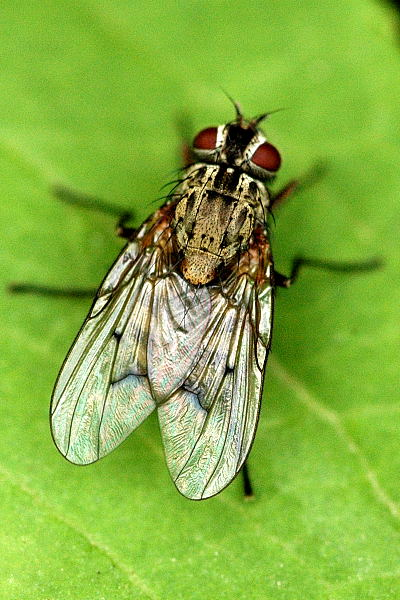
- Phaonia fuscata, female

Scientific classification
- Kingdom: Animalia
- Phylum: Arthropoda
- Class: Insecta
- Order: Diptera
- Family: Muscidae
- Genus: Phaonia
- Species: P. fuscata

Binomial name
- Phaonia fuscata (Fallén, 1825)

Synonyms
- Musca fuscata Fallén, 1825

= Phaonia fuscata =

Species of fly

Phaonia fuscata is a species of fly which is widely distribution across the Palaearctic.

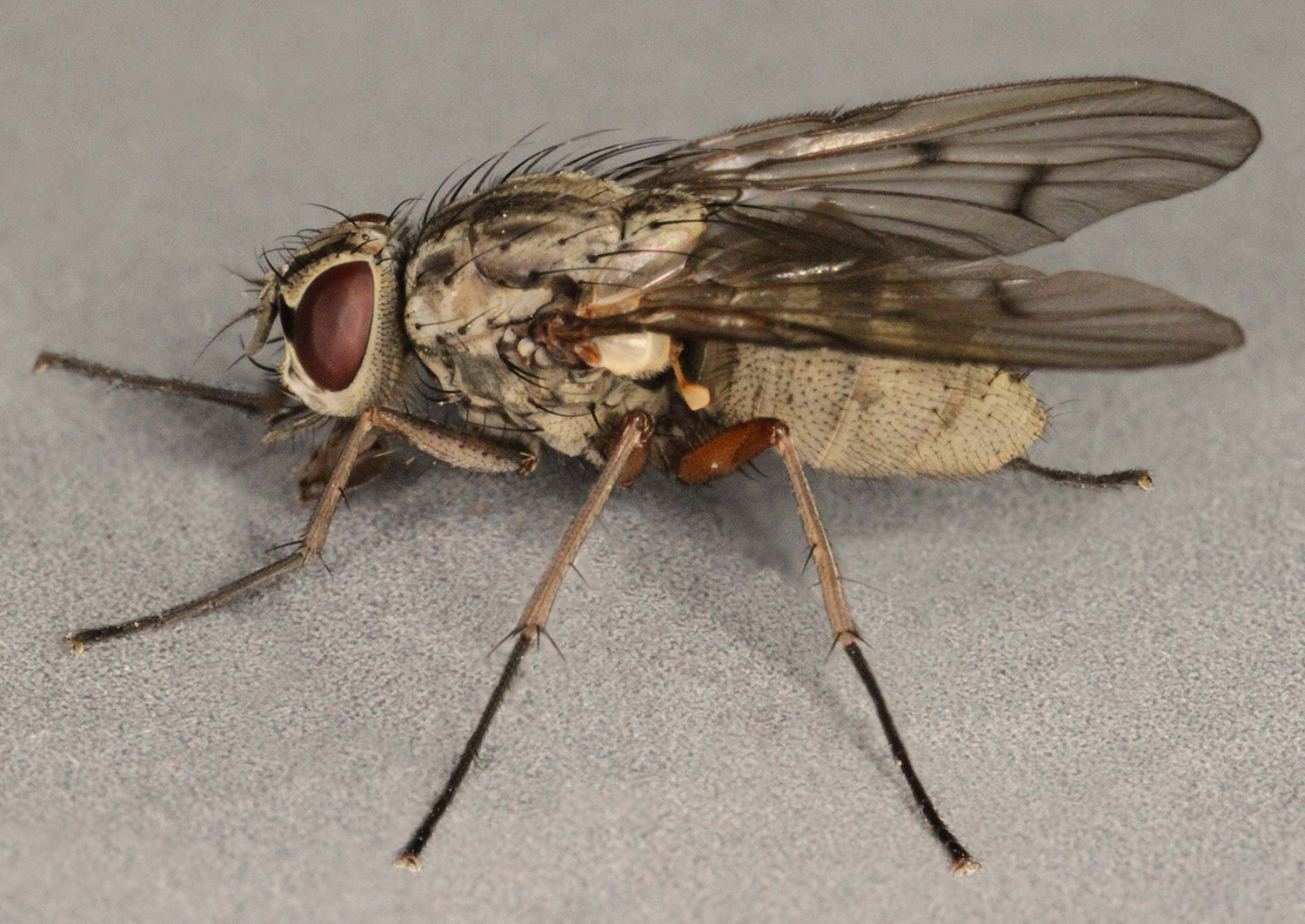
