= Steleoneura novemmaculata =

Scientific classification
- Kingdom: Animalia
- Phylum: Arthropoda
- Class: Insecta
- Order: Diptera
- Family: Tachinidae
- Subfamily: Exoristinae
- Tribe: Blondeliini
- Genus: Steleoneura
- Species: S. novemmaculata

Binomial name
- Steleoneura novemmaculata Wood, 1985

Species of fly

Steleoneura novemmaculata is a species of fly in the family Tachinidae.

== Distribution ==
Canada, United States, Russia.
