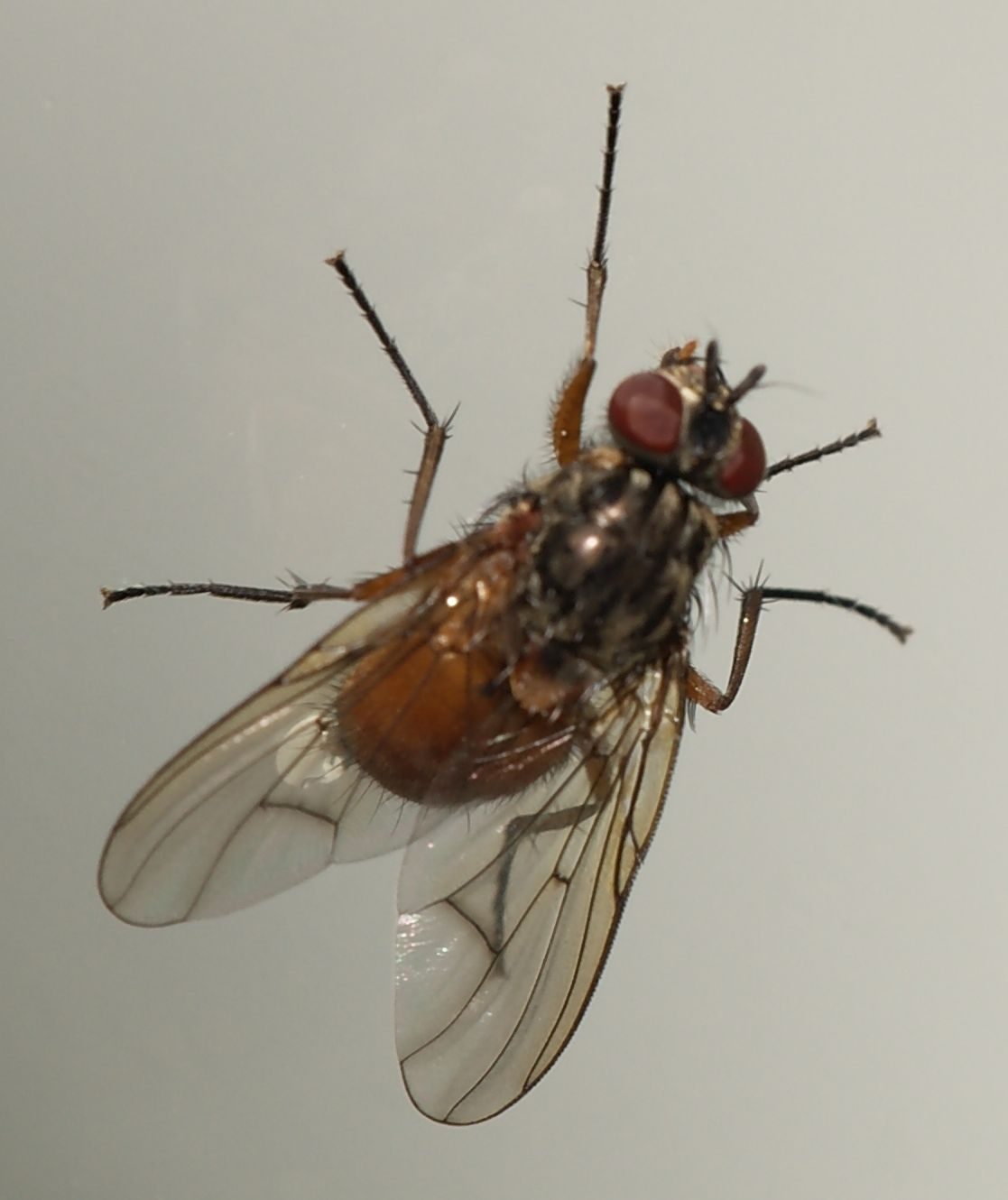
- Phaonia subventa, female

Scientific classification
- Kingdom: Animalia
- Phylum: Arthropoda
- Clade: Pancrustacea
- Class: Insecta
- Order: Diptera
- Family: Muscidae
- Genus: Phaonia
- Species: P. subventa

Binomial name
- Phaonia subventa (Harris, 1780)

Synonyms
- Anthomyia variegata Meigen, 1826; Musca subventa Harris, 1780; Phaonia variegata (Meigen, 1826)

= Phaonia subventa =

Species of fly

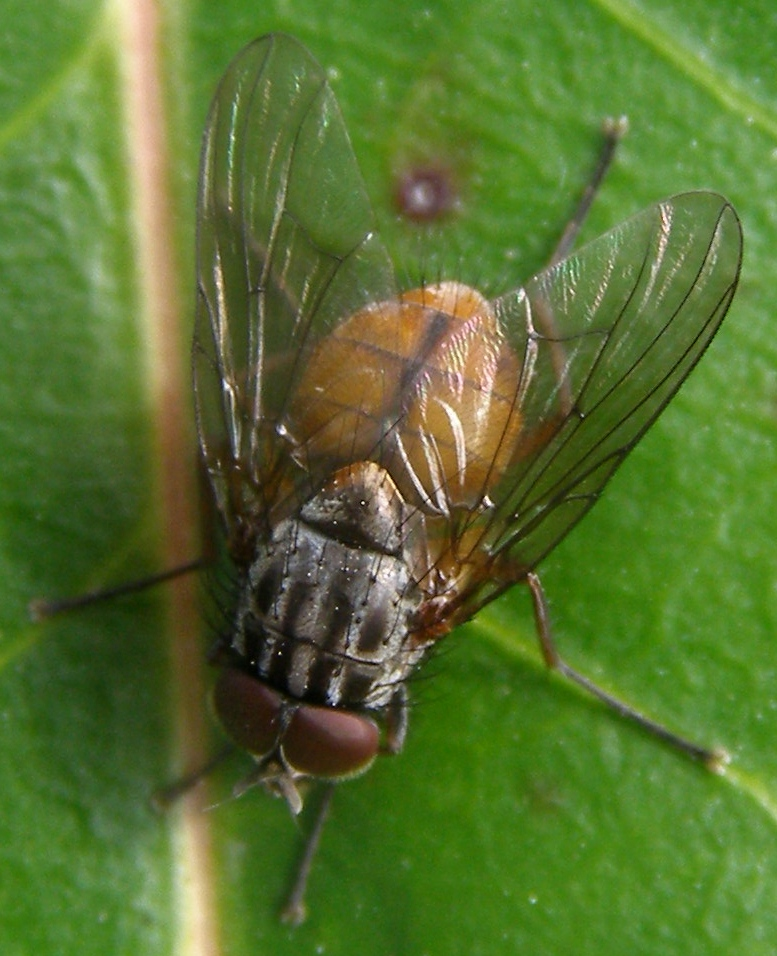
Phaonia subventa, male

Phaonia subventa is a species of fly which is distributed across parts of the Palaearctic.
