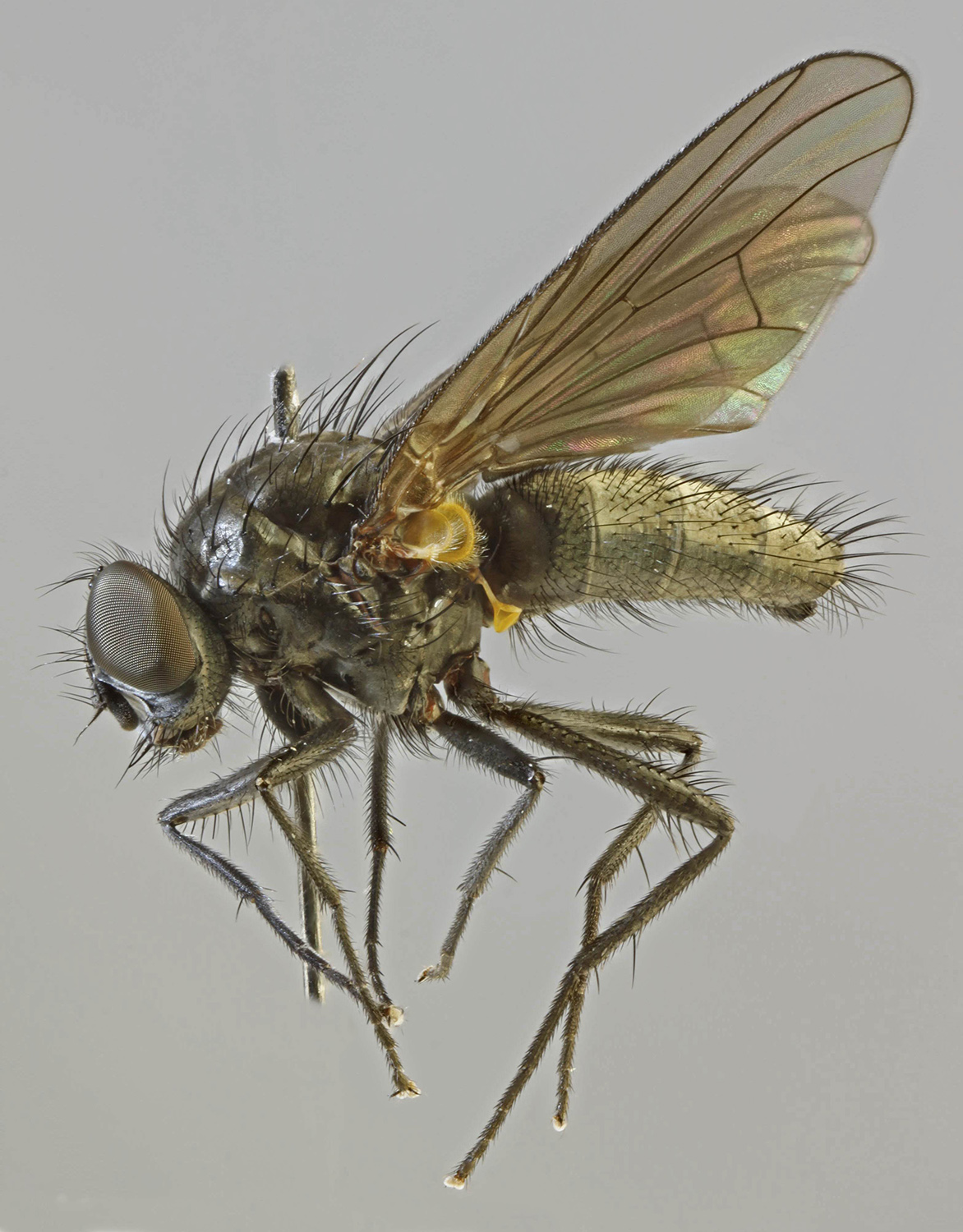
- Lophosceles cinereiventris North Wales

Scientific classification
- Kingdom: Animalia
- Phylum: Arthropoda
- Clade: Pancrustacea
- Class: Insecta
- Order: Diptera
- Family: Muscidae
- Genus: Lophosceles
- Species: L. cinereiventris

Binomial name
- Lophosceles cinereiventris (Zetterstedt, 1845)

= Lophosceles cinereiventris =

Species of fly

Lophosceles cinereiventris is a fly from the family Muscidae. It is found in the Palearctic.
