= Steleoneura australis =

Scientific classification
- Kingdom: Animalia
- Phylum: Arthropoda
- Class: Insecta
- Order: Diptera
- Family: Tachinidae
- Subfamily: Exoristinae
- Tribe: Blondeliini
- Genus: Steleoneura
- Species: S. australis

Binomial name
- Steleoneura australis (Aldrich, 1934)

Synonyms
- Embiomyia australis Aldrich, 1934

Species of fly

Steleoneura australis is a species of fly in the family Tachinidae.

== Distribution ==
Argentina, Chile.
