= Oscar Ringdahl =

Swedish entomologist

Oscar Ringdahl (1885–1966) was a Swedish entomologist who specialised in Diptera and Trichoptera. He described many new species from Sweden and Lappland. Parts of his personal collection are in the Swedish Museum of Natural History and Lund University Zoology Museum (Lunds Universitet Zoologiska museet), Lund.

== Biography ==
Oscar Ringdahl was born in Uppsala on 28 August 1885 into a family of teachers and showed an early interest in insect collecting on the shores of lake Mälaren. He trained as a secondary-school natural science teacher but spent most summers between 1910 and 1940 undertaking self-financed field trips from southern Scania to the Torne and Lule river valleys, amassing more than 120,000 pinned Diptera and Trichoptera specimens. In 1927 he was invited to curate the Diptera section of the Swedish Museum of Natural History; although never formally employed there, he organised the national collection according to the then-new Snodgrass–Curran system and produced the first Swedish Muscidae catalogue in 1939.

== Research ==
Ringdahl described 164 new species—124 Muscidae, 31 Anthomyiidae and nine Trichoptera—and published more than sixty papers, many in Opuscula entomologica. His 1952 Catalogus Insectorum Sueciae volume synthesised scattered literature and museum labels into a critical, synonymised checklist that remained the national standard until the 1990s. He corresponded widely with dipterists such as James E. Collin and Fritz Zumpt, exchanging Scandinavian material for Afrotropical and Australasian specimens that broadened the museum's comparative holdings.

== Professional service and legacy ==
A long-time member of the Entomological Society of Sweden, Ringdahl edited the Diptera section of Svensk Insektfauna (1954–1956) and chaired the society's recording scheme, encouraging amateurs to submit county records that filled major distribution gaps in northern Sweden. Portions of his private collection—especially type material of Phaonia, Spilogona and Limnophora—were bequeathed to Lund University Zoology Museum, while his field notebooks and annotated maps are archived at the Swedish Museum of Natural History and continue to inform modern faunistic surveys.

== Selected publications ==
- Ringdahl, O. (1939) Diptera der Fam. Muscidae, (die Gattungen Aricia und Anthomyza) von Zetterstedt in “Insecta Lapponica” und “Diptera Scandinaviae” beschrieben. Opuscula entomologica, 4, 137–159.
- Ringdahl, O. (1952) Catalogus Insectorum Sueciae. XI. Diptera Cyclorrhapha: Muscaria Schizometopa. Opuscula entomologica 17: 129–186
- Ringdahl, O. with Peder Nielsen and Søren Ludvig Tuxen (1954) Zoology of Iceland. Vol III. Part 48a. Diptera. Copenhagen and Reykjavik: Ejnar Munksgaard,
- Ringdahl, O. (1954) Svensk Insektfauna, 11, Diptera, Cyclorapha Schizophora Schizometopa, I. Fam. Muscidae (Häfte 1): 91.
- Ringdahl, O. (1956) Svensk insektfauna: Muscidae, Stockholm. Entomologiska Foreningen., 1: 1–334.
