= Henryk Dziedzicki =

Polish physician and entomologist

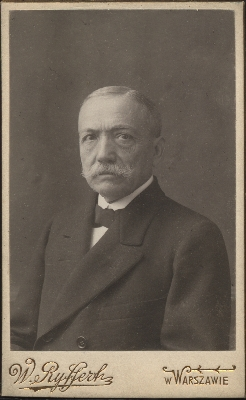
Henryk Daniel Robert Dołęga Dziedzicki

Henryk Daniel Robert Dołęga Dziedzicki (1847, Warsaw - 1921, Warsaw) was a Polish physician and entomologist.

He studied medicine at the University of Warsaw. In the years 1872-1873, he took part in an expedition to Egypt, financed and organized by Aleksander Branicki. On 28 September 1874 he received the title of doctor of Medicine of the University of Warsaw.

Dziedzicki was an active member of the scientific society of Warsaw and a Member of Entomological Associations in Saint Petersburg, Berlin and Vienna. His sister married the entomologist Johann Andreas Schnabl.

He especially revised the family Mycetophilidae, where detailed differences in the construction of the genitalia were used for identification. He described about 120 new species from the family Mycetophilidae and two new genera Heteropygium and Allophallus.

Taxa named to honour him are

- Helophilus henricii Schnabl, 1880,
- Phronia dziedzickii Lundstrom, 1906
- Sciophila dziedzickii Edwards, 1925
- Paraneurotelia dziedzickii Landrock, 1911

== Works ==
- Przyczynek do fauny owadów dwuskrzydłych ... (1884-1889)
- Die Anthomyiden (1909)
- Zur Monographie der Gattung Rymosia (1909)
- Atlas organów rozrodczych (hypopygium) typów Winnertza i gatunków znajdujących się w jego zbiorze mycetophylidów (1915)
- Przegląd gatunków europejskich rodzaju Antella Winnertz oraz opis dwu nowych rodzajów: Heteropygium i Allophallus (1923)
