= Johann Andreas Schnabl =

Johann Andreas Schnabl (born Jan Sznabla, 1838 – 1912) was born a Pole of German descent, and was an entomologist specializing in Diptera. His family moved from Dresden to Warsaw in the late 18th century, hence the German heritage.

Trained as a physician, he taught classes in natural history in Warsaw. His wide-ranging travels included scientific trips to the Caucasus, the Urals, Lapland, the Pyrenees, Corsica, Hungary and Peru.

== Scientific works ==
He is the taxonomic author of the family Fanniidae and the genera Spilogona and Paregle. With Heinrich Dziedzicki, he described the genera Polietina, Pegoplata and Villeneuvia.

He is commemorated with the species Mycetophila schnablii (a fungus gnat) and Cheilosia schnabli (a dipteran species) as well as Amorphochilus schnablii, commonly known as the smoky bat, a chiropteran native to western South America.

== Publications ==
- Contributions à la faune diptérologique (1887).
- Contributions à la faune diptérologique. Additions aux descriptions precedentes des Aricia et descriptions des espèces nouvelles (1888).
- Die Anthomyiden (with H. Dziedzicki), 1911 - Anthomyiidae.
