= Paul Stein (entomologist) =

German museum curator and entomologist

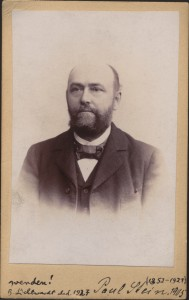
Paul Stein

Paul Stein (1852–1921) was a German museum curator and entomologist. He specialised in Diptera especially the family Anthomyiidae. In this group he studied the world fauna describing many new genera and species.

Stein worked with Theodor Becker, Mario Bezzi and Kálmán Kertész on Katalog der Paläarktischen dipteren (1903 onwards) published in Budapest from 1903. His collection is in the Museum für Naturkunde in Berlin.

== Works ==
(partial list)

- Die Anthomyidengruppe Homalomyia nebst ihren Gattungen und Arten 141 p (1895)
- Nordamerikanische Anthomyiden 128 p Berlin (1897).
- Die afrikanischen Anthomyiden des Königl.Zool.Mus.zu Berlin 48 p,( 1906).
- Voyage Alluaud en Afrique Orientale. Anthomyidae 41 p - 14 figs (1914)

== Sources ==
- Musgrave, A., Bibliography of Australian Entomology 1775-1930 Sydney, 1932.
