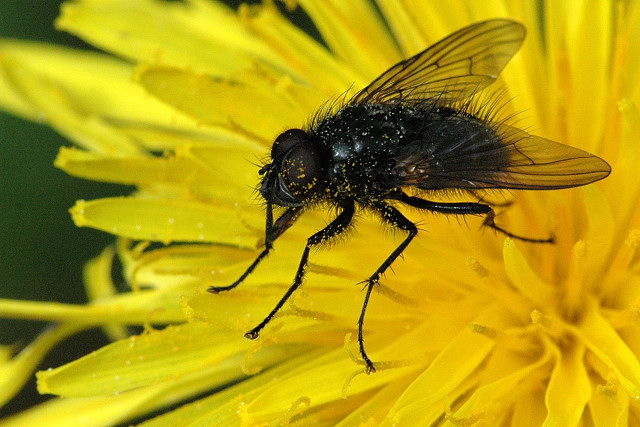
- Phaonia atriceps

Scientific classification
- Kingdom: Animalia
- Phylum: Arthropoda
- Clade: Pancrustacea
- Class: Insecta
- Order: Diptera
- Family: Muscidae
- Subfamily: Phaoniinae
- Tribe: Phaoniini; Malloch, 1917

= Phaoniini =

Tribe of flies

Phaoniini is a tribe in the fly family Muscidae. It contains the largest Muscid genus Phaonia.

== Genera ==
- Chaetophaonia Carvalho & Nihei, 2005
- Dolichophaonia Carvalho, 1993
- Helina Robineau-Desvoidy, 1830
- Lophosceles Ringdahl, 1922
- Phaonia Robineau-Desvoidy, 1830
- Souzalopesmyia Albuquerque, 1951
