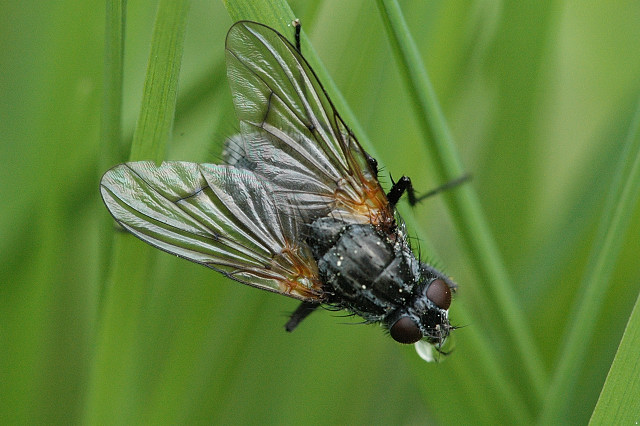
- Phaonia scutellata

Scientific classification
- Kingdom: Animalia
- Phylum: Arthropoda
- Clade: Pancrustacea
- Class: Insecta
- Order: Diptera
- Family: Muscidae
- Subfamily: Phaoniinae; Malloch, 1917

Tribes
- Phaoniini

= Phaoniinae =

Subfamily of flies

The subfamily Phaoniinae is within the Diptera family Muscidae. All species are in the tribe Phaoniini.
