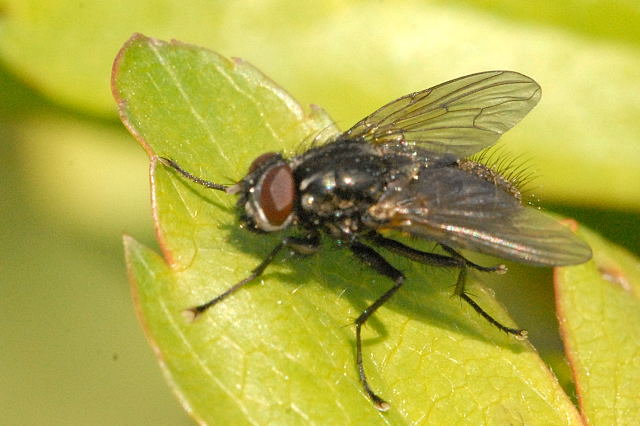
- Morellia aenescens

Scientific classification
- Kingdom: Animalia
- Phylum: Arthropoda
- Clade: Pancrustacea
- Class: Insecta
- Order: Diptera
- Family: Muscidae
- Subfamily: Muscinae
- Tribe: Muscini
- Genus: Morellia; Robineau-Desvoidy, 1830

= Morellia =

Genus of flies

Morellia is a very large genus from the fly family Muscidae. Morellia are plumpish black flies, largely lacking eye hairs - sparse at most. they have a white dusting on the parafacialia and the scutum has 4 distinct longitudinal stripes.

== Selected species ==
- M. aenescens Robineau-Desvoidy, 1830
- M. asetosa Baranoff, 1925
- M. basalis (Walker, 1853)
- M. hortorum (Fallén, 1817)
- M. micans (Macquart, 1855)
- M. podagrica (Loew, 1857)
- M. simplex (Loew, 1857)
