= Eudasyphora cordilleriana =

Scientific classification
- Kingdom: Animalia
- Phylum: Arthropoda
- Class: Insecta
- Order: Diptera
- Family: Muscidae
- Subfamily: Muscinae
- Tribe: Muscini
- Genus: Eudasyphora
- Species: E. cordilleriana

Binomial name
- Eudasyphora cordilleriana Cuny, 1980

Species of fly

Eudasyphora cordilleriana is a species of fly.

== Distribution ==
British Columbia to Saskatchewan, south to Oregon and Wyoming.
