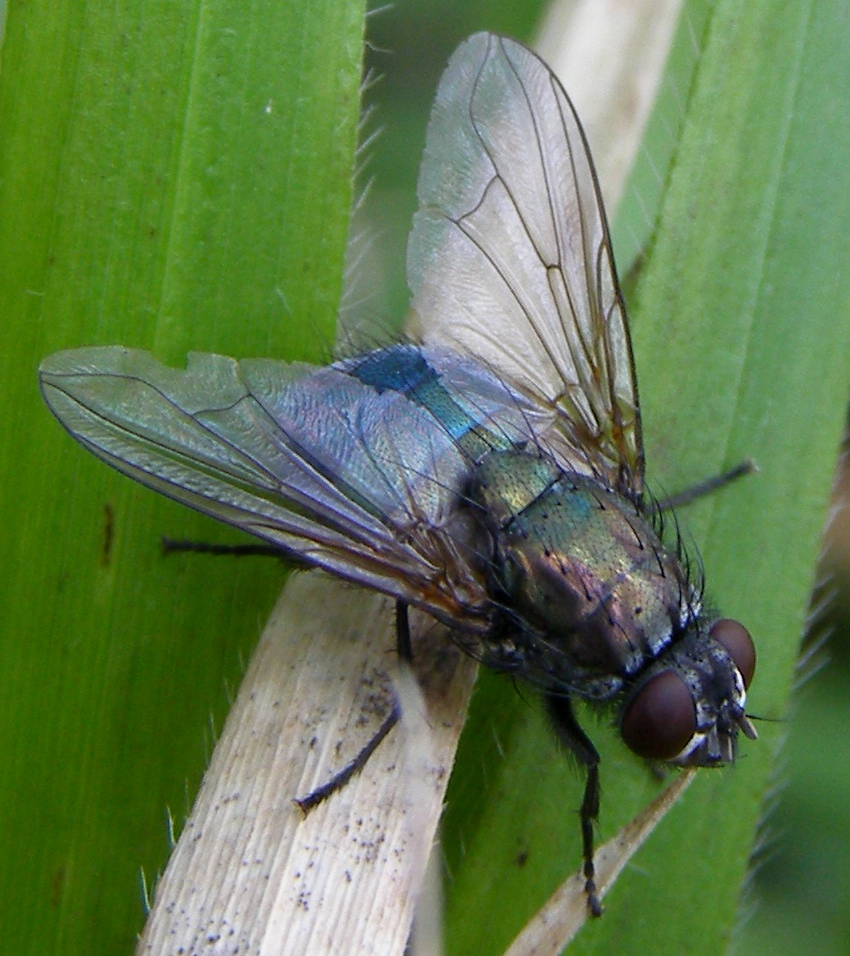
- Female Eudasyphora cyanella

Scientific classification
- Kingdom: Animalia
- Phylum: Arthropoda
- Class: Insecta
- Order: Diptera
- Family: Muscidae
- Subfamily: Muscinae
- Tribe: Muscini
- Genus: Eudasyphora
- Species: E. cyanella

Binomial name
- Eudasyphora cyanella (Meigen, 1826)

Synonyms
- Musca mano Harris, 1780; Musca cyanella Meigen, 1826; Lucilia eriophthalma Macquart, 1834; Lucilia lasiophthalma Macquart, 1834

= Eudasyphora cyanella =

Species of fly

Eudasyphora cyanella is a species of fly. It is a common species in England and Wales and is most commonly found in April and May.
