= Dasyphora =

Scientific classification
- Kingdom: Animalia
- Phylum: Arthropoda
- Clade: Pancrustacea
- Class: Insecta
- Order: Diptera
- Family: Muscidae
- Subfamily: Muscinae
- Tribe: Muscini
- Genus: Dasyphora; Robineau-Desvoidy, 1830

Genus of flies

Dasyphora is a genus from the fly family Muscidae. There are currently 1,148 recorded instances of this fly by human observation, material sample, preserved specimen, or unknown source. The majority of these records are in northern North America and Europe.

== Species list ==
- D. affricana
- D. albofasciata (Macquart, 1839)
- D. apicotaeniata
- D. asiatica
- D. canadiana
- D. cordilleriana
- D. cyanella
- D. cyanicolor
- D. gansuensis
- D. gussakovskii
- D. himalayensis
- D. huilensis
- D. kempi
- D. latifrons
- D. meriodionalis
- D. paraversicolor
- D. penicillata (Egger, 1865)
- D. pratorum (Meigen, 1826)
- D. qinghaiensis
- D. setitiba
- D. similis
- D. sinensis
- D. stackelbergiana
- D. tianshanensis
- D. trichosterna
