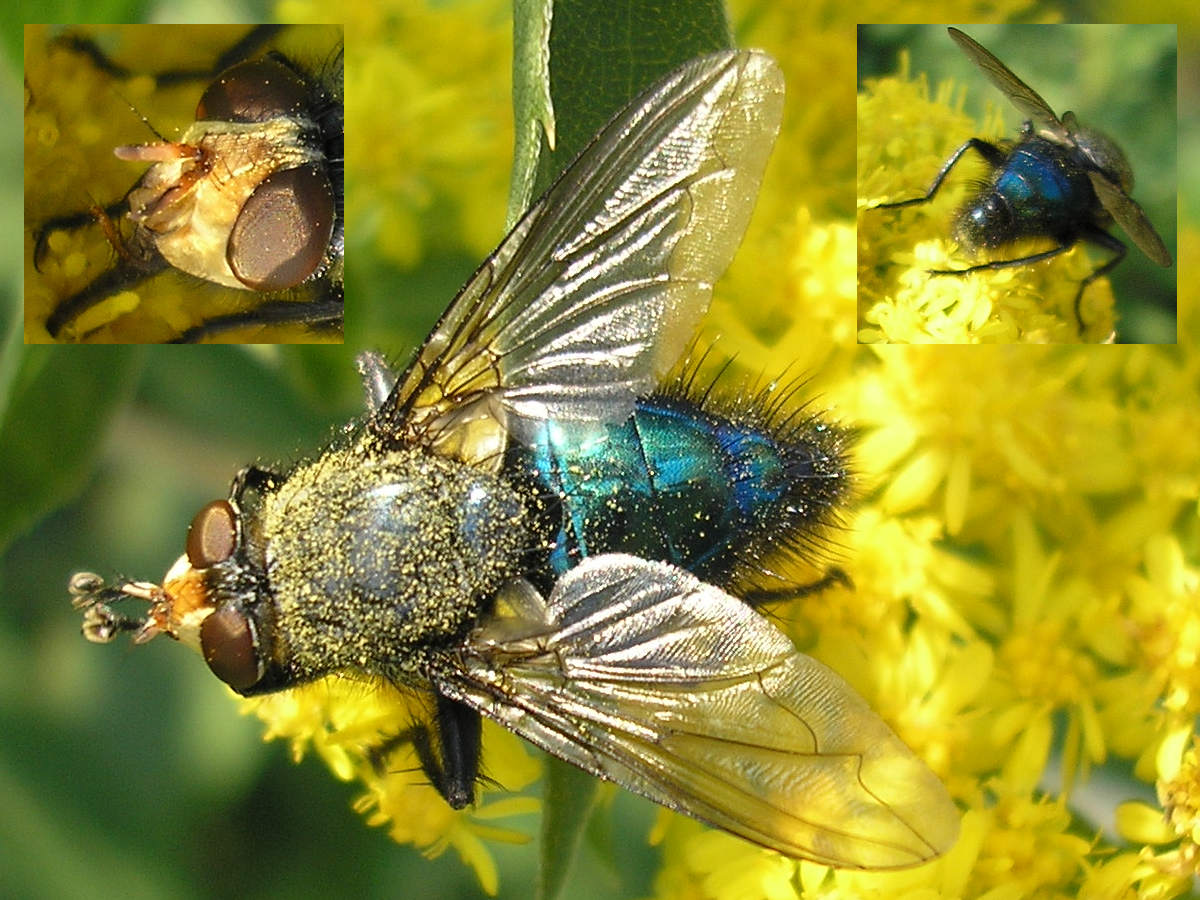
- Cynomya mortuorum male

Scientific classification
- Kingdom: Animalia
- Phylum: Arthropoda
- Class: Insecta
- Order: Diptera
- Family: Calliphoridae
- Genus: Cynomya
- Species: C. mortuorum

Binomial name
- Cynomya mortuorum (Linnaeus, 1761)

Synonyms
- Cynomya vomitoria (Harris, 1780); Musca mortuorum Linnaeus, 1761; Musca vomitoria Harris, 1780

= Cynomya mortuorum =

Species of fly

Cynomya mortuorum belongs to the order Diptera, sometimes referred to as "true flies". In English, the only common name occasionally used is "fly of the dead" (Totenfliege in German). It has a bluish-green appearance, similar to other Calliphoridae and is found in multiple geographic locations with a preference for colder regions. Belonging to the family Calliphoridae, it has been shown to have forensically relevant implications due to its appearance on carrion. Current research is being done to determine C. mortuorum's level of importance and usage within forensic entomology.

== General characteristics and life cycle ==
C. mortuorum is a deep blue-green shining metallic fly with a yellowish face and jowls, possessing a body length of 8–15 mm. This fly is a cold-adapted blowfly originally named by Carl Linnaeus in 1761. It lays its eggs on carrion, which provides food for the larvae and facilitates the larvae's development. The development lasts approximately 38 days. As do most blow flies, or members of the family Calliphoridae, C. mortuorum has a life cycle that includes an egg stage, three larval instars, and a pupal form before becoming an adult, or imago. Insects with this kind of life cycle have holometabolous development, meaning that the larval stage looks completely different from the adult. Each of these stages has identifying characteristics that are unique to this species.

=== Egg ===
As an egg, it has been described as a whitish cylinder with a tapered anterior end and blunt posterior end. The egg is generally 1.62 to 1.75 mm in length and 0.5–0.7 mm in width. These eggs are generally larger than other calliphorid eggs. On the dorsal surface of the egg, there are two hatching pleats on either side of the chorion, which acts as a plastron. Sometimes, the eggs can be difficult to separate from eggs of other species, so great care needs to be taken when using these eggs for forensic studies.

=== Larvae ===
The larval stage is broken up into three instars; and, each instar has 12 segments. The first instar is about 1.87 to 2.13 mm in length, and has complete anterior spinal bands on segments 2 through 8 and complete posterior bands on segments 7 through 11. Also, the skeleton of this instar has a lateral plate on which the narrowest portion is smaller than the length of the mouth hook; this is the same for the second instar. The second instar, however, is 2.74 to 3.75 mm in length, and has complete anterior spinal bands on segments 2 through 9 and complete posterior spinal bands on segments 8 through 11. Lastly, the third instar has been found to be 13.12 to 14.00 mm in length with complete anterior spinal bands on segments 2 through 8 and complete posterior spinal bands on segments 10 through 11. It can be distinguished from other third instar larvae in that the dorsal margin of its tooth is mostly straight, and then curves suddenly at the tip.

=== Pupae ===
The pupae of C. mortuorum are generally longer than pupae of Calliphora species, ranging from 8.49 to 9.75 mm.

== Identification ==
The genus Cynomya is generally identified by their lack of presutural intra-alar seta. Also, this genus has a shining abdomen, and when they are viewed from the posterior, no microtomentum can be seen. Within this genus, there are two species that can be commonly confused: Cynomya mortuorum and Cynomya cadaverina. However, looking at specific characteristics can help separate these two species. First, C. mortuorum has bright yellow to orange gena, or cheeks, and parafacials, whereas C. cadaverina has black or reddish brown gena and parafacial setae. Also, C. mortuorum has only one postacrostichal seta, and C. cadaverina has two. Lastly, C. cadaverina is much more common throughout North America.

== Ecology ==
C. mortuorum lives on woodland edges, meadows, and other places with flowers in Europe and Asia. It has been found in the northern regions of both Europe and North America, and east to Turkestan. Also, it can be found in a wide variety of carrion from rotting fish to Arctic vole carcasses. Within England, it has been found mostly in upland areas – above 500 m. In these upland areas, it is mostly found on small carcasses, such as mice and other small mammals; occasionally, it will be found on larger carcasses like sheep. In the absence of carrion, excrement provides a food source. The adults feed on pollen, and are found from May to September. C. mortuorum has not been shown to cause myiasis.

As a cold weather fly, it is expected to show up in the fall months. However, one study found the presence of C. mortuorum on a mouse carcass in mid-August, and on a sheep carcass in mid-June.

== Uses in forensic entomology ==
The use of C. mortuorum in the judicial system is most commonly applied to the medicocriminal branch of forensic entomology. It is often useful in estimating the post-mortem interval of a human cadaver. By studying the morphology and stage of development of the C. mortuorum obtained from a body, one can determine an estimate of a time of death for that body. Plenty of variables play into the use of insects in a criminal investigation, including temperature, certain chemicals, or location, but determining an arthropod's stage of development on a corpse proves to be an accurate technique in estimating a time of death.

Calliphoridae eggs, like C. mortuorum eggs, usually hatch twenty-four to forty-eight hours after being laid. These specimens, once hatched, undergo three instars in their larval stage, which can take anywhere from four to twenty-one days. Another three to fourteen days account for the blow fly's pre-pupae stage, and, finally, the pupae stage can take an additional three to twenty days. Depending on certain variables, a forensic entomologist can pinpoint which stage of development a C. mortuorum is in, and how long it and the carcass it is feeding on have been there.

== Forensic case studies ==
C. mortuorum is used in numerous forensic cases as a source of post mortem interval information. The population tends to locate itself in the Norway and Finland area and is much less popular in the United States or the Iberian Peninsula. A current case located in Norway dealt with a deceased woman containing dead Cynomya mortuorum larvae in her oral cavity. It was a suicidal case that was proven by the toxicology reports. Nozinan was found at extreme levels in the woman's blood, and to further prove the suicide, there were pills of this nature located directly next to the body.

The larvae found in the mouth were strictly third instar larvae of C. mortuorum. These were the only third instars found on the entire body. Forensic entomologists found that the eggs must have been laid in early October, since in Norway during December months, the temperature would have been too cold to sustain the larvae. Total developmental time consists of 25–31 days. Therefore, the woman had died in the same month, seeing that it takes less than a month's time to reach third instar development.

== Current research ==
C. mortuorum, as well as many other Calliphorid species are forensically important due to their predictable succession within a decomposing corpse, which can provide important information relating to time and place of death. In order to predict a valid time estimation, highly accurate species identification is essential. Using morphological methods to identify differences between such closely related species can often be very difficult, especially if the fly or larvae has been poorly preserved. With current technology, DNA typing of these insects offers a quick and reliable alternative.

In Europe and parts of the U.S., a study has been conducted collecting DNA sequence data over a range of commonly encountered forensically important Calliphoridae species. One species observed was the C. mortuorum. This specimen was collected in Durham, UK. Flies used in this study were caught with liver-baited sticky traps. High quality DNA was extracted from these flies, and the genetic marker used in this study was the large sub-unit (lsu) ribosomal RNA gene. (This lsu rRNA gene has also been used in studies of evolutionary analysis of other organisms.) The DNA analysis collected in this study provides insight to different evolutionary patterns apparent in the family Calliphoridae, which can possibly provide a measure of the degree of genetic variation likely to be encountered within taxonomic groups of different forensic usefulness. This study provides the first documented molecular based phylogenic analysis of the blowfly species. This research and more studies to come in the future will greatly assist the identification of larvae and adult insect species, which may play a great role in medicocriminal forensic entomology.
