= Eudasyphora canadiana =

Scientific classification
- Kingdom: Animalia
- Phylum: Arthropoda
- Class: Insecta
- Order: Diptera
- Family: Muscidae
- Subfamily: Muscinae
- Tribe: Muscini
- Genus: Eudasyphora
- Species: E. canadiana

Binomial name
- Eudasyphora canadiana Cuny, 1980

Species of fly

Eudasyphora canadiana is a species of fly.

== Distribution ==
Alaska to Labrador, south to Oregon, Indiana
