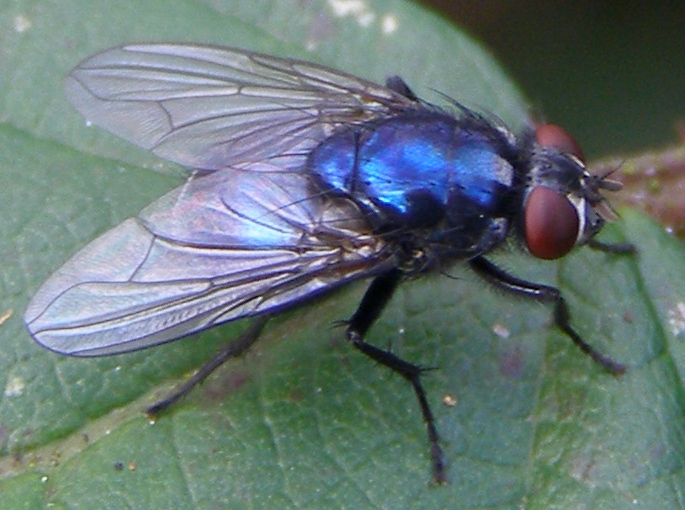
- Eudasyphora cyanicolor, female

Scientific classification
- Kingdom: Animalia
- Phylum: Arthropoda
- Clade: Pancrustacea
- Class: Insecta
- Order: Diptera
- Family: Muscidae
- Subfamily: Muscinae
- Tribe: Muscini
- Genus: Eudasyphora; Townsend, 1911

Type species
- Lucilia lasiophthalma Macquart, 1834

= Eudasyphora =

Genus of flies

Eudasyphora is a large genus from the fly family Muscidae.

== Species list ==
- E. canadiana Cuny, 1980
- E. cordilleriana Cuny, 1980
- E. cyanella (Meigen, 1826)
- E. cyanicolor (Zetterstedt, 1845)
- E. kempi Aubertin & Emden, 1965
- E. occidentalis (Peris & Llorente, 1963)
- E. zimini (Hennig, 1963)
