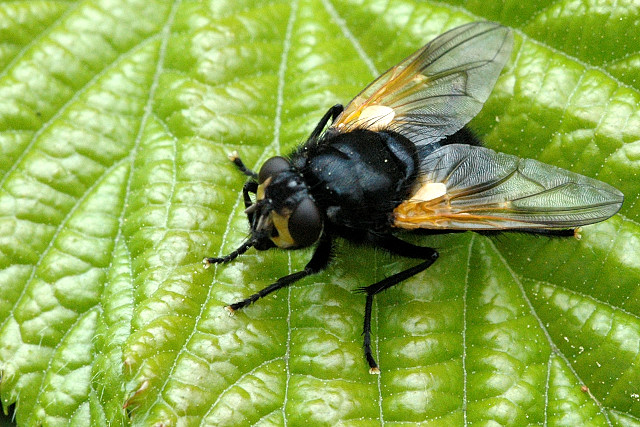
- Mesembrina meridiana female

Scientific classification
- Kingdom: Animalia
- Phylum: Arthropoda
- Clade: Pancrustacea
- Class: Insecta
- Order: Diptera
- Family: Muscidae
- Subfamily: Muscinae
- Tribe: Muscini
- Genus: Mesembrina; Meigen, 1826

= Mesembrina =

Genus of flies

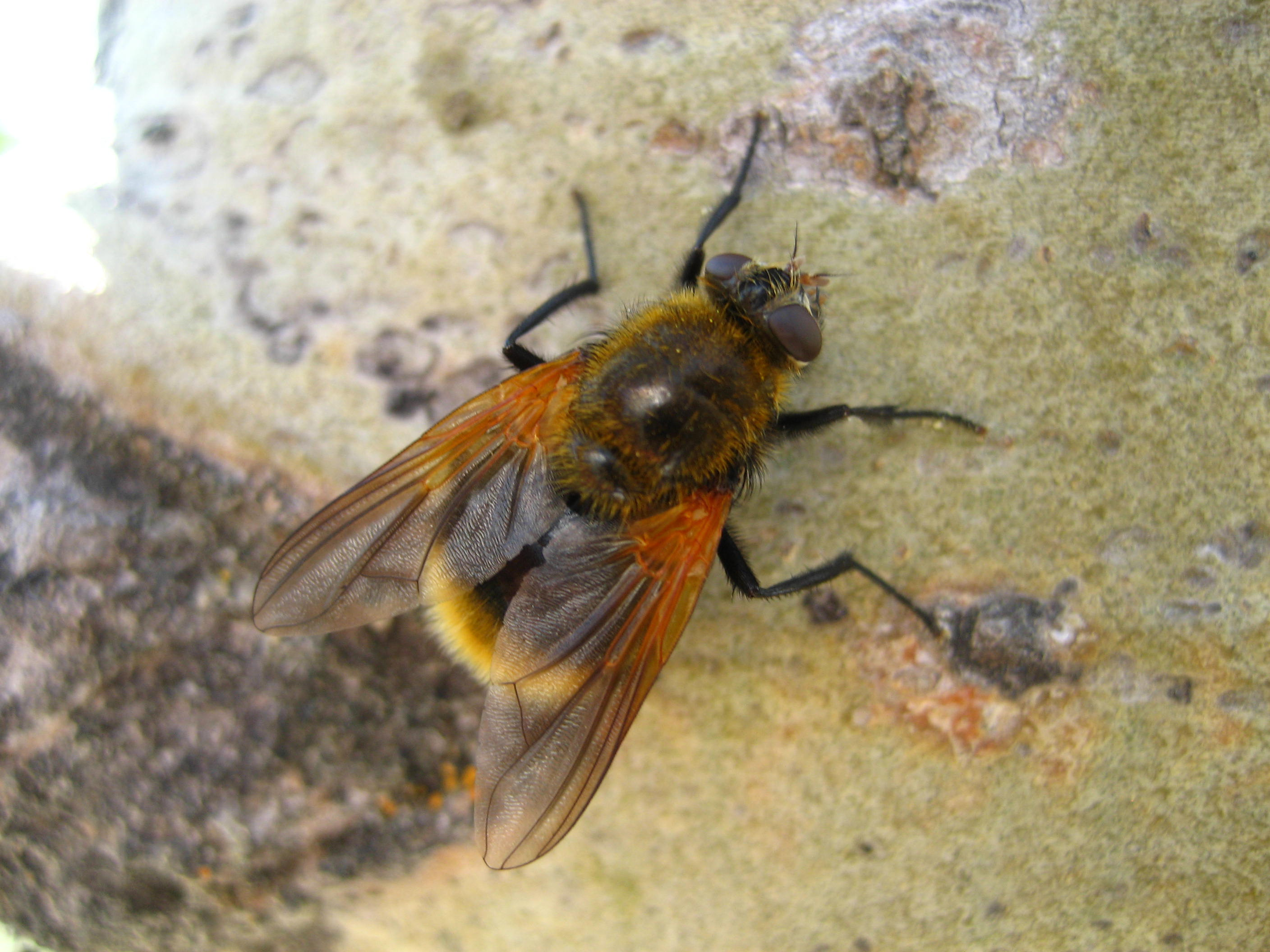
Mesembrina decipiens

Mesembrina is a genus from the fly family Muscidae.

== Species ==
These 14 valid species belong to the genus Mesembrina:

- Mesembrina asternopleuris Fan, 1992^{c g}
- Mesembrina aurocaudata Emden, 1965^{c g}
- Mesembrina ciliimaculata Fan & Zheng, 1992^{c g}
- Mesembrina decipiens Loew, 1873^{c g b}
- Mesembrina intermedia (Zetterstedt, 1849)^{c g}
- Mesembrina latreillii Robineau-Desvoidy, 1830^{i c g b}
- Mesembrina magnifica Aldrich, 1925^{c g}
- Mesembrina meridiana (Linnaeus, 1758)^{c g}
- Mesembrina montana Zimin, 1951^{c g}
- Mesembrina mystacea (Linnaeus, 1758)^{c g}
- Mesembrina nigribasis Kuchta & Savage, 2008^{c g}
- [?] Mesembrina pallida (excluded, see taxonomy)
- Mesembrina resplendens Wahlberg, 1844^{c g}
- Mesembrina tristis Aldrich, 1926^{c g}

Data sources: i = ITIS, c = Catalogue of Life, g = GBIF, b = Bugguide.net

== Taxonomy ==
For Mesembrina pallida (Say, 1829)^{c g} this is treated in some schemes as Nomen dubium, therefore excluded.

For Mesembrina decipiens also see the junior synonym Hyperdermodes solitaria Knab, 1914, given in some sources as Mesembrina solitaria (Knab, 1914)^{i}
