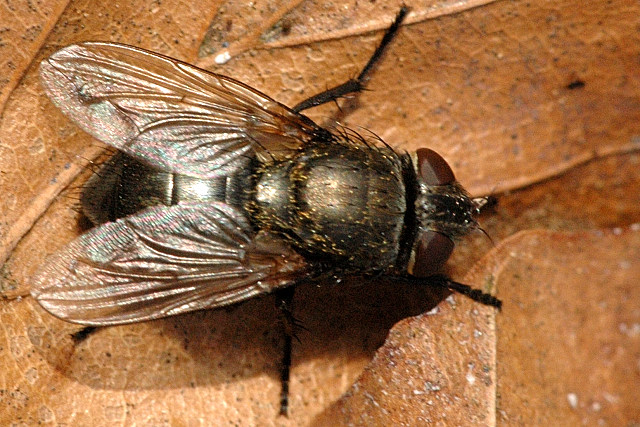
- Neomyia cornicina female.

Scientific classification
- Kingdom: Animalia
- Phylum: Arthropoda
- Clade: Pancrustacea
- Class: Insecta
- Order: Diptera
- Family: Muscidae
- Subfamily: Muscinae
- Tribe: Muscini
- Genus: Neomyia; Walker, 1859

Type species
- Musca gavisa Walker, 1859

Synonyms
- Euphoria Robineau-Desvoidy, 1863; Orthellia Robineau-Desvoidy, 1863; Pseudopyrellia Girschner, 1864

= Neomyia =

Genus of flies

Neomyia is a genus from the fly family Muscidae.

== Species ==
- Neomyia cornicina (Fabricius)
- Neomyia viridescens (Robineau-Desvoidy, 1830)
