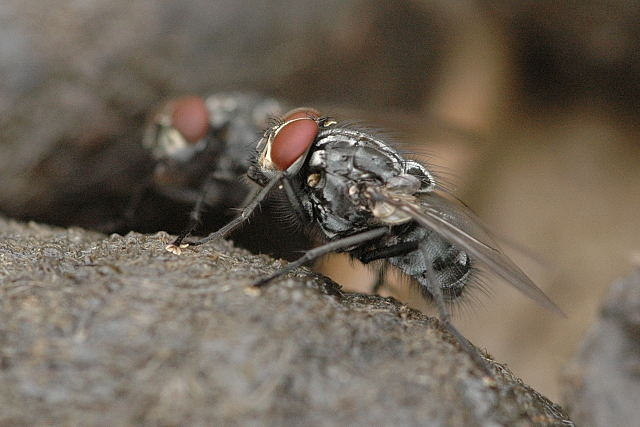
- Polietes lardarius male

Scientific classification
- Kingdom: Animalia
- Phylum: Arthropoda
- Clade: Pancrustacea
- Class: Insecta
- Order: Diptera
- Family: Muscidae
- Subfamily: Muscinae
- Tribe: Muscini
- Genus: Polietes; Rondani, 1866

Synonyms
- Polietella Ringdahl, 1922; Pseudomorellia Ringdahl, 1929; Pseudophaonia Malloch, 1918

= Polietes =

Genus of flies

Polietes is a genus from the fly family of Muscidae.

== Species ==
- Polietes domitor (Harris, 1780)
- Polietes hirticrura Meade, 1887
- Polietes lardarius (Fabricius, 1781)
- Polietes major (Ringdahl, 1926)
- Polietes meridionalis Peris & Llorente, 1963
- Polietes nigrolimbatus (Bonsdorff, 1866)
- Polietes orichalceoides (Huckett, 1965)
- Polietes steinii (Ringdahl, 1913)
