= Mesembrina latreillii =

Scientific classification
- Domain: Eukaryota
- Kingdom: Animalia
- Phylum: Arthropoda
- Class: Insecta
- Order: Diptera
- Family: Muscidae
- Tribe: Muscini
- Genus: Mesembrina
- Species: M. latreillii

Binomial name
- Mesembrina latreillii Robineau-desvoidy, 1830

Synonyms
- Eumesembrina alascensis Townsend, 1908

Species of fly

Mesembrina latreillii is a species of house flies, etc. in the family Muscidae.
