= Nearctic realm =

One of Earth's eight biogeographic realms

The Nearctic realm (in green)

The Nearctic realm is one of the eight biogeographic realms constituting Earth's land surface.

The Nearctic realm covers most of North America, including Greenland, Central Florida, and the highlands of Mexico. The parts of North America that are not in the Nearctic realm include most of coastal Mexico, southern Mexico, southern Florida, coastal central Florida, Central America, Bermuda and the Caribbean islands. Together with South America, these regions are part of the Neotropical realm.

== Major ecological regions ==
Ecoregions of the Nearctic realm, color-coded by ecoregion. Note that much of the coast, south, and southwest Mexico and South Florida in the United States are considered part of the Neotropic realm.

The World Wildlife Fund (WWF) divides the Nearctic into four bioregions, defined as "geographic clusters of ecoregions that may span several habitat types, but have strong biogeographic affinities, particularly at taxonomic levels higher than the species level (genus, family)".

=== Canadian Shield ===
The Canadian Shield bioregion extends across the northern portion of the continent, from the Aleutian Islands to Newfoundland. It includes the Nearctic's arctic tundra and boreal forest ecoregions.

In terms of floristic provinces, it is represented by part of the Canadian Province of the Circumboreal Region.

=== Eastern North America ===
The Eastern North America bioregion includes the temperate broadleaf and mixed forests of the Eastern United States and southeastern Canada, the Great Plains temperate grasslands of the central U.S. and south-central Canada, the temperate coniferous forests of the southeastern U.S., including central Florida. In terms of floristic provinces, it is represented by the North American Atlantic Region and part of the Canadian Province of the Circumboreal Region.

=== Western North America ===
The Western North America bioregion includes the temperate coniferous forests of the coastal and mountain regions of southern Alaska, western Canada, and the western U.S. from the Pacific Coast and Northern California to the Rocky Mountains (known as the Cascadian bioregion), as well as the cold-winter intermountain deserts and xeric shrublands and temperate grasslands and shrublands of the Western U.S.

In terms of floristic provinces, it is represented by the Rocky Mountain region.

=== Northern Mexico ===
The Northern Mexico bioregion includes the mild-winter to cold-winter deserts and xeric shrublands, warm temperate and subtropical pine and pine-oak forests, and Mediterranean climate ecoregions of the Mexican Plateau, Baja California peninsula, and the southwestern U.S., bordered to the south by the Neotropical Trans-Mexican Volcanic Belt. This region also includes the only subtropical dry broadleaf forest in the Nearctic realm, the Sonoran–Sinaloan transition subtropical dry forest.

In terms of floristic provinces, it is represented by the Madrean Region.

== History ==
Although North America and South America are presently joined by the Isthmus of Panama, these continents were separated for about 180 million years, and evolved very different plant and animal lineages. When the ancient supercontinent of Pangaea split into two about 180 million years ago, North America remained joined to Eurasia as part of the supercontinent of Laurasia, while South America was part of the supercontinent of Gondwana. North America later split from Eurasia. North America has been joined by land bridges to both Asia and South America since then, which allowed an exchange of plant and animal species between the continents, the Great American Interchange.

A former land bridge across the Bering Strait between Asia and North America allowed many plants and animals to move between these continents, and the Nearctic realm shares many plants and animals with the Palearctic. The two realms are sometimes included in a single Holarctic realm.

Many large animals, or megafauna, including horses, camels, tapirs, mammoths, mastodons, ground sloths, sabre-tooth cats (Smilodon), short-faced bears and the American cheetah, became extinct in North America at the end of the Pleistocene epoch (ice ages) in what is called the Quaternary extinction event.

== Flora and fauna ==
=== Flora and fauna that originated in the Nearctic ===
Mammals originally unique to the Nearctic include:

- Order Primates – the first primate/proto-primate, Purgatorius, originated in the Early Paleocene of the Nearctic.
- Family Canidae – dogs, wolves, foxes, and coyotes.
- Family Camelidae – camels and their South American relatives including the llama. Now extinct in the Nearctic
- Family Equidae – horses, donkeys and their relatives. Now only found in the Nearctic as feral horses and donkeys.
- Family Tapiridae – tapirs now extinct in the Nearctic.
- Family Antilocapridae – last survivor of which is the pronghorn.
- Subfamily Tremarctinae (short-faced bears) – including the giant short-faced bear (Arctodus simus). The only surviving member of the group is the spectacled bear (Tremarctos ornatus) of South America.

=== Flora and fauna endemic to the Nearctic ===
Two mammal families are endemic to the Nearctic, the pronghorns (Antilocapridae) and the mountain beaver (Aplodontiidae). The Holarctic has four endemic families of birds: divers (Gaviidae), grouse (Tetraoninae), auks (Alcidae), and the waxwings (Bombycillidae). The scarab beetle families Pleocomidae and Diphyllostomatidae (Coleoptera) are also endemic to the Nearctic. The fly species Cynomya cadaverina is also found in high numbers in this area.

Plant families endemic or nearly endemic to the Nearctic include the Crossosomataceae, Simmondsiaceae, and Limnanthaceae.

== See also ==
- List of ecoregions in Canada (WWF)
- List of ecoregions in Mexico (WWF)
- List of ecoregions in the United States (WWF)

Ecoregion	Location(s)
Alai–Western Tian Shan steppe	Kazakhstan, Tajikistan, Uzbekistan
Altai steppe and semi-desert	Kazakhstan
Central Anatolian steppe	Turkey
Daurian forest steppe	China, Mongolia, Russia
Eastern Anatolian montane steppe	Armenia, Azerbaijan, Georgia, Iran, Turkey
Emin Valley steppe	China, Kazakhstan
Faroe Islands boreal grasslands	Faroe Islands, Denmark
Gissaro–Alai open woodlands	Kyrgyzstan, Tajikistan, Uzbekistan
Kazakh forest steppe	Kazakhstan, Russia
Kazakh steppe	Kazakhstan, Russia
Kazakh Uplands	Kazakhstan
Mongolian–Manchurian grassland	China, Mongolia, Russia
Pontic steppe	Kazakhstan, Moldova, Romania, Russia, Ukraine, Bulgaria
Sayan Intermontane steppe	Russia
Selenge–Orkhon forest steppe	Mongolia, Russia
South Siberian forest steppe	Russia
Syrian xeric grasslands and shrublands	Iraq, Jordan, Syria
Tian Shan foothill arid steppe	China, Kazakhstan, Kyrgyzstan
