= Pyrellia =

- Pyrellia vivida

Scientific classification
- Kingdom: Animalia
- Phylum: Arthropoda
- Clade: Pancrustacea
- Class: Insecta
- Order: Diptera
- Family: Muscidae
- Subfamily: Muscinae
- Tribe: Muscini
- Genus: Pyrellia; Robineau-Desvoidy, 1830

Type species
- Pyrellia vivida Robineau-Desvoidy, 1830

Genus of flies

Pyrellia is a genus from the fly family Muscidae.

== Species ==
- Pyrellia acaciae Pont & Baldock, 2007
- Pyrellia albocuprea Villeneuve, 1914
- Pyrellia ampullacea Couri, Pont & Penny, 2006
- Pyrellia attonita Pont, 1973
- Pyrellia basalis Walker
- Pyrellia cadaverina (Linnaeus, 1758)
- Pyrellia difficilis Zielke, 1971
- Pyrellia flavicornis Macquart
- Pyrellia habaheensis Fan & Qian, 1992
- Pyrellia ignita Robineau-Desvoidy, 1830
- Pyrellia keiseri Zielke, 1972
- Pyrellia kuhlowi Zielke, 1971
- Pyrellia maculipennis Macquart, 1851
- Pyrellia minuta Zimin, 1951
- Pyrellia natalensis Paterson, 1958
- Pyrellia neuhausi Zielke, 1971
- Pyrellia ochricornis Wiedemann
- Pyrellia ponti Shinonaga & Tumrasvin, 1978
- Pyrellia proferens (Walker, 1859)
- Pyrellia purpureonitens Emden, 1965
- Pyrellia rapax (Harris, 1780)
- Pyrellia schumanni Zielke, 1971
- Pyrellia scintillans Bigot, 1888
- Pyrellia secunda Zimin, 1951
- Pyrellia spinthera Bigot, 1878
- Pyrellia stuckenbergi Paterson, 1957
- Pyrellia suchariti Shinonaga & Tumrasvin, 1978
- Pyrellia tasmaniae Macquart, 1846
- Pyrellia viridissima Meunier, 1908
- Pyrellia vivida Robineau-Desvoidy, 1830
- Pyrellia wittei Zielke, 1971
