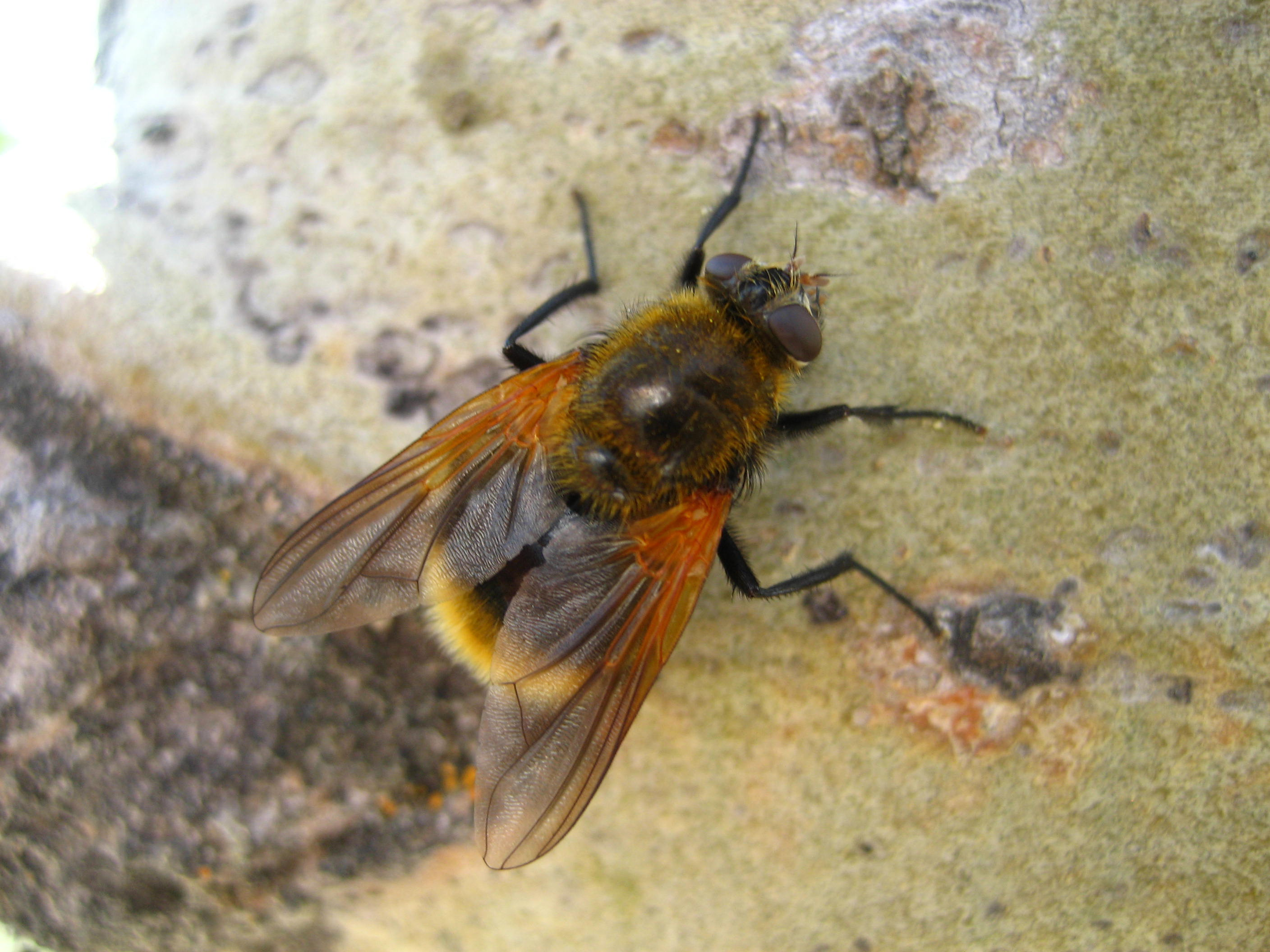

Scientific classification
- Domain: Eukaryota
- Kingdom: Animalia
- Phylum: Arthropoda
- Class: Insecta
- Order: Diptera
- Family: Muscidae
- Tribe: Muscini
- Genus: Mesembrina
- Species: M. decipiens

Binomial name
- Mesembrina decipiens Loew, 1873

= Mesembrina decipiens =

Species of house flies

Mesembrina decipiens is a species of house flies, etc. in the family Muscidae. There are two recognised synonyms, Mesembrina putziloi Portschinsky, 1873 and Hyperdermodes solitaria Knab, 1914 per Kutchta & Savage (2008).
