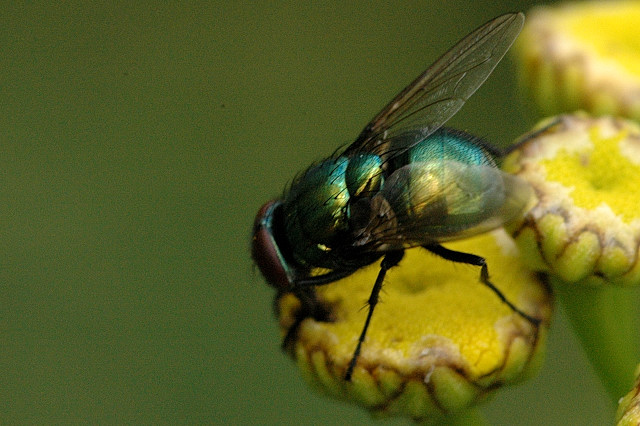
- Male

Scientific classification
- Kingdom: Animalia
- Phylum: Arthropoda
- Class: Insecta
- Order: Diptera
- Family: Muscidae
- Genus: Neomyia
- Species: N. cornicina

Binomial name
- Neomyia cornicina (Fabricius, 1781)

Synonyms
- Musca caesarion Meigen, 1826; Musca chloris Haliday, 1833; Musca cornicina Fabricius, 1781; Musca ingredior Harris, 1780; Musca redeo Harris, 1780; Euphoria viridis Wiedemann, 1824; Neomyia caesarion (Meigen, 1826); Neomyia chloris (Haliday, 1833); Neomyia fennica (Frey, 1909); Neomyia ingredior (Harris, 1780); Neomyia redeo (Harris, 1780); Neomyia viridis (Wiedemann, 1824); Pseudopyrellia fennica Frey, 1909

= Neomyia cornicina =

Species of fly

Neomyia cornicina is a common species of fly which is distributed across many parts the Palaearctic. It has been introduced in the Nearctic.
