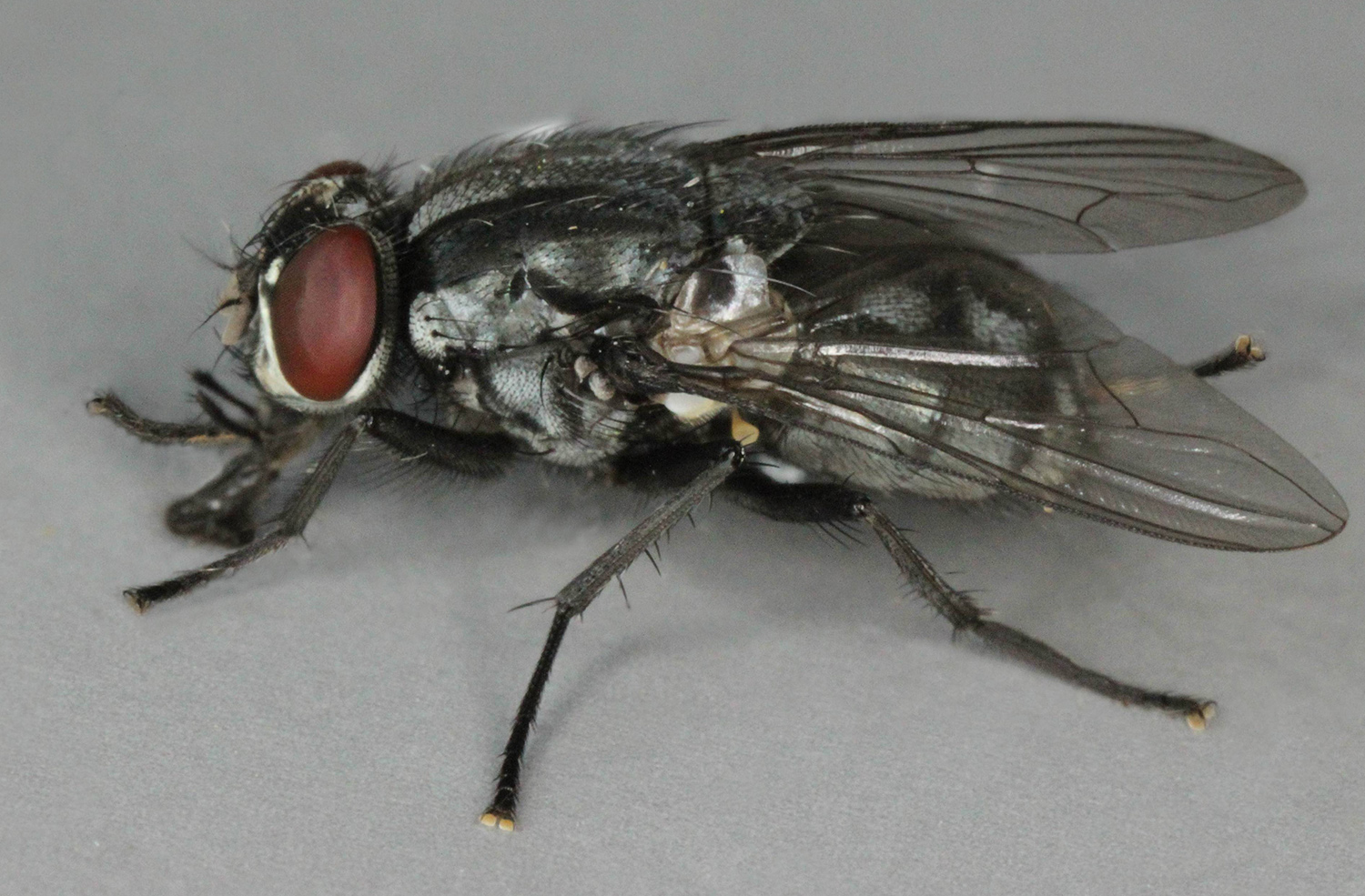
- Morellia simplex North Wales

Scientific classification
- Kingdom: Animalia
- Phylum: Arthropoda
- Clade: Pancrustacea
- Class: Insecta
- Order: Diptera
- Family: Muscidae
- Genus: Morellia
- Species: M. simplex

Binomial name
- Morellia simplex (Loew, 1857)

= Morellia simplex =

Species of fly

Morellia simplex is a fly from the family Muscidae. It is found in the Palearctic.
