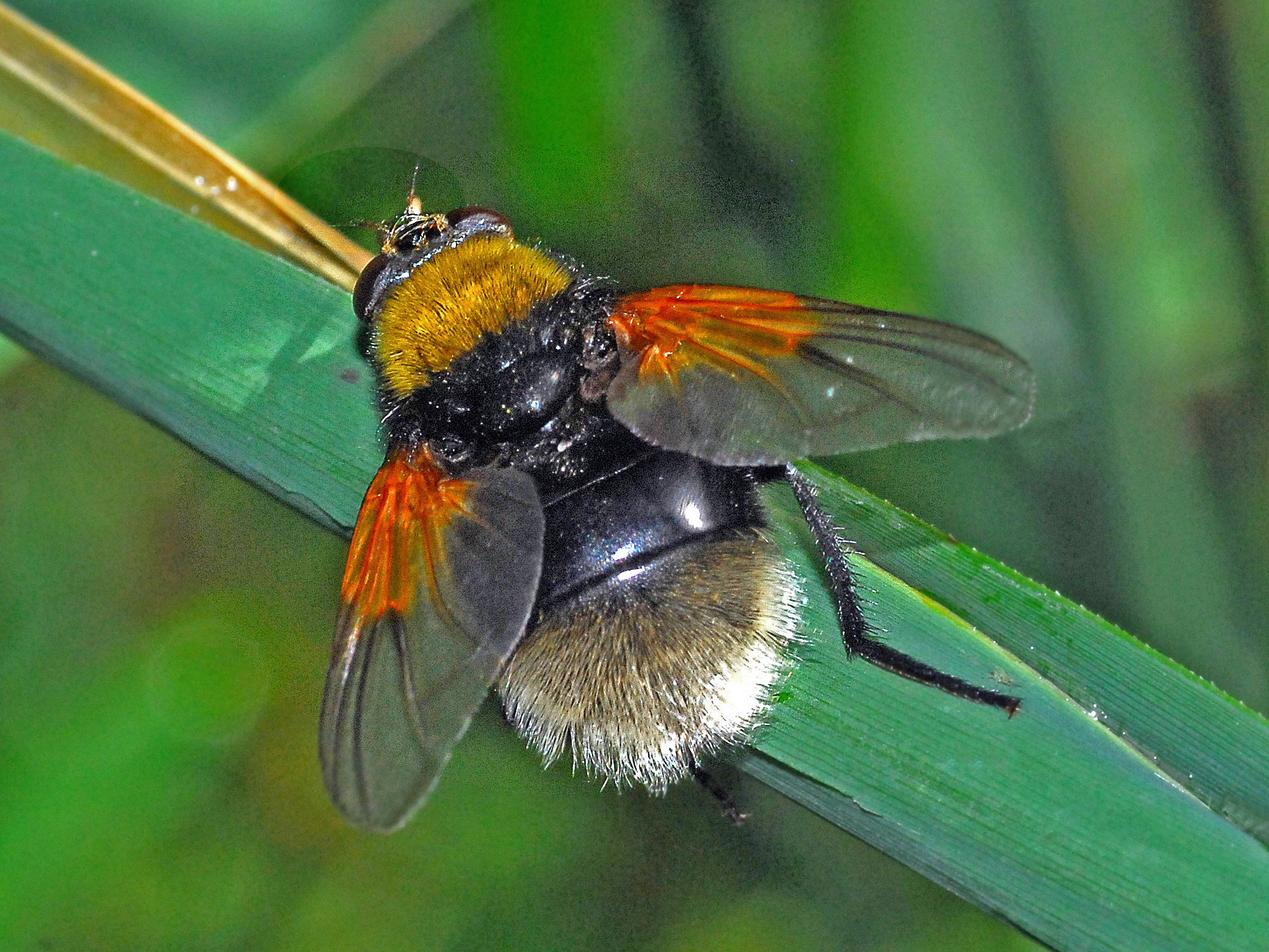

Scientific classification
- Kingdom: Animalia
- Phylum: Arthropoda
- Class: Insecta
- Order: Diptera
- Family: Muscidae
- Genus: Mesembrina
- Species: M. mystacea

Binomial name
- Mesembrina mystacea (Linnaeus, 1758)

Synonyms
- Mesembrina vespertina Rondani, 1862; Mesembrina matutina Rondani, 1862; Musca bombinatrix Schrank, 1837; Musca bombylina Retzius, 1783<; Syrphus apiarius Fabricius, 1781; Musca bombylius De Geer, 1776; Musca bombyloides Sulzer, 1776; Musca discolor Linnaeus, 1758

= Mesembrina mystacea =

Species of fly

Mesembrina mystacea is a fly belonging to the family Muscidae. It's commonly referred to as the moustached fly.

== Distribution ==
This species is present in the Palaearctic realm, from Fennoscandia south to Turkey and from the Atlantic seaboard across Eurasia to as far as Mongolia.

== Description ==
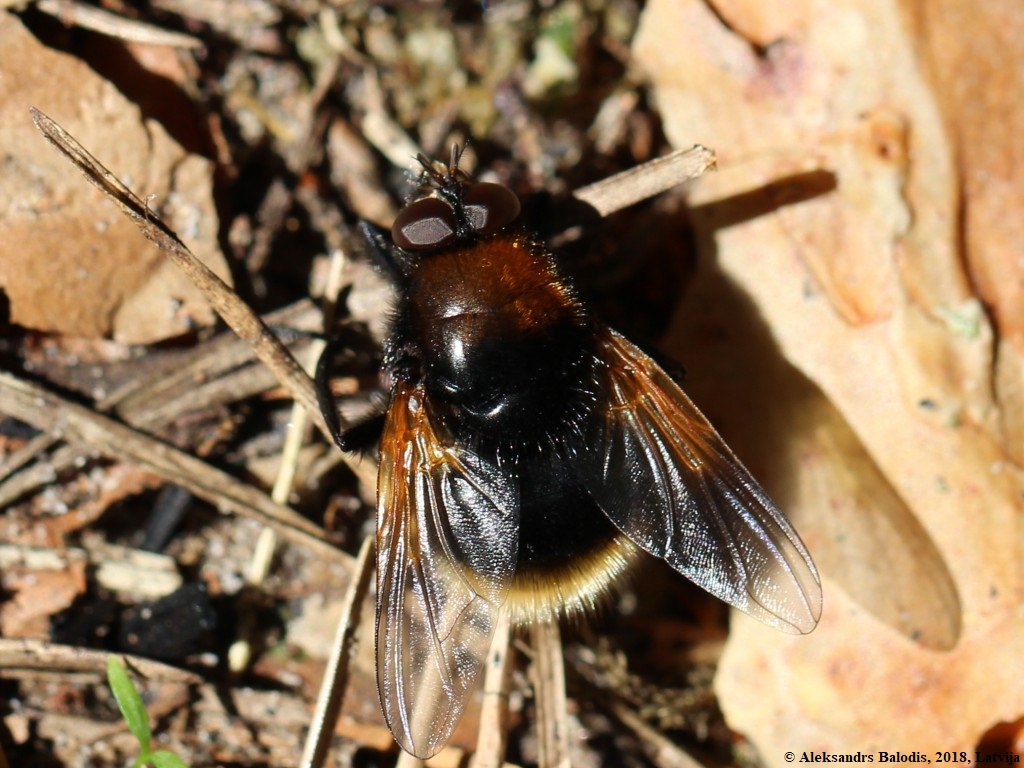
Mesembrina mystacea. Male

Mesembrina mystacea can reach a length of 9–12 millimetres (0.35–0.47 in). These large, distinctive flies are beautifully colored in black, yellow-brown and white. They have a stout body. The long body hairs are mostly black, but they show a band of fine yellow-brown short hairs anteriorly across the thoracic dorsum and dense brown hairs on the abdomen, with white hairs at the edge. Metathorax and abdomen are shiny black. Eyes are bare. A large orange colouration is present on the base of the wings.

The species exhibits a certain sexual dimorphism. In fact the anterior yellow-brown thoracic band of hairs is much narrower in the male than in the female. Moreover, in the male the mid tibiae are curved with longer hairs, while in the females they are straight and without longe hairs.

These flies closely mimic certain Bombus species (bumblebees) (Apidae family). They are very similar to the hoverflies Criorhina berberina and Pocota personata (Syrphidae). Superficially they also resemble the hoverfly Volucella bombylans. M. mystacea is the only bumble-bee mimic among the Mesembrina species present in western Europe.

== Biology and habitat ==
Adults of Mesembrina mystacea can be found from June to September. The larvae feed on dung and dead material. In western Europe these flies are forest insects. They can be found in woodland or be grazed by cattle, in the Quercus, Fagus and Picea zones. This species belongs to insects with complete metamorphosis which involves a pupal stage.
