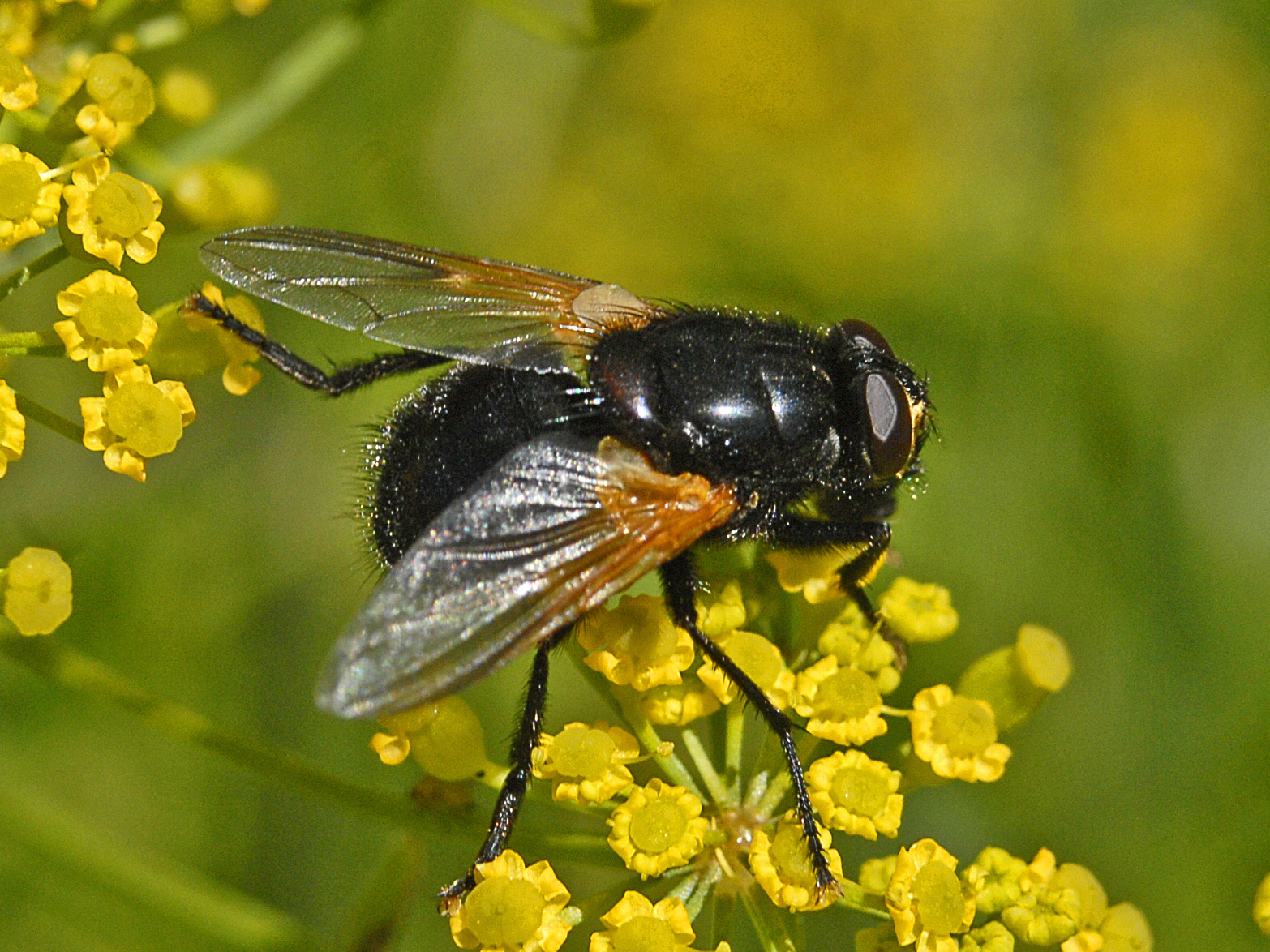
- Mesembrina meridiana ♂ Male

Scientific classification
- Kingdom: Animalia
- Phylum: Arthropoda
- Class: Insecta
- Order: Diptera
- Family: Muscidae
- Genus: Mesembrina
- Species: M. meridiana

Binomial name
- Mesembrina meridiana (Linnaeus, 1758)

Synonyms
- Musca meridiana Linnaeus, 1758; Mesembrina ingrica Portschinsky, 1873

= Mesembrina meridiana =

Species of fly

Mesembrina meridiana, sometimes known as the noon fly or noonday fly, is a species of fly in the family Muscidae.

== Distribution ==
This common species is widespread in most of Europe, in the Near East, in the eastern Palearctic realm (Russia, Mongolia, China), and in North Africa.

== Description ==
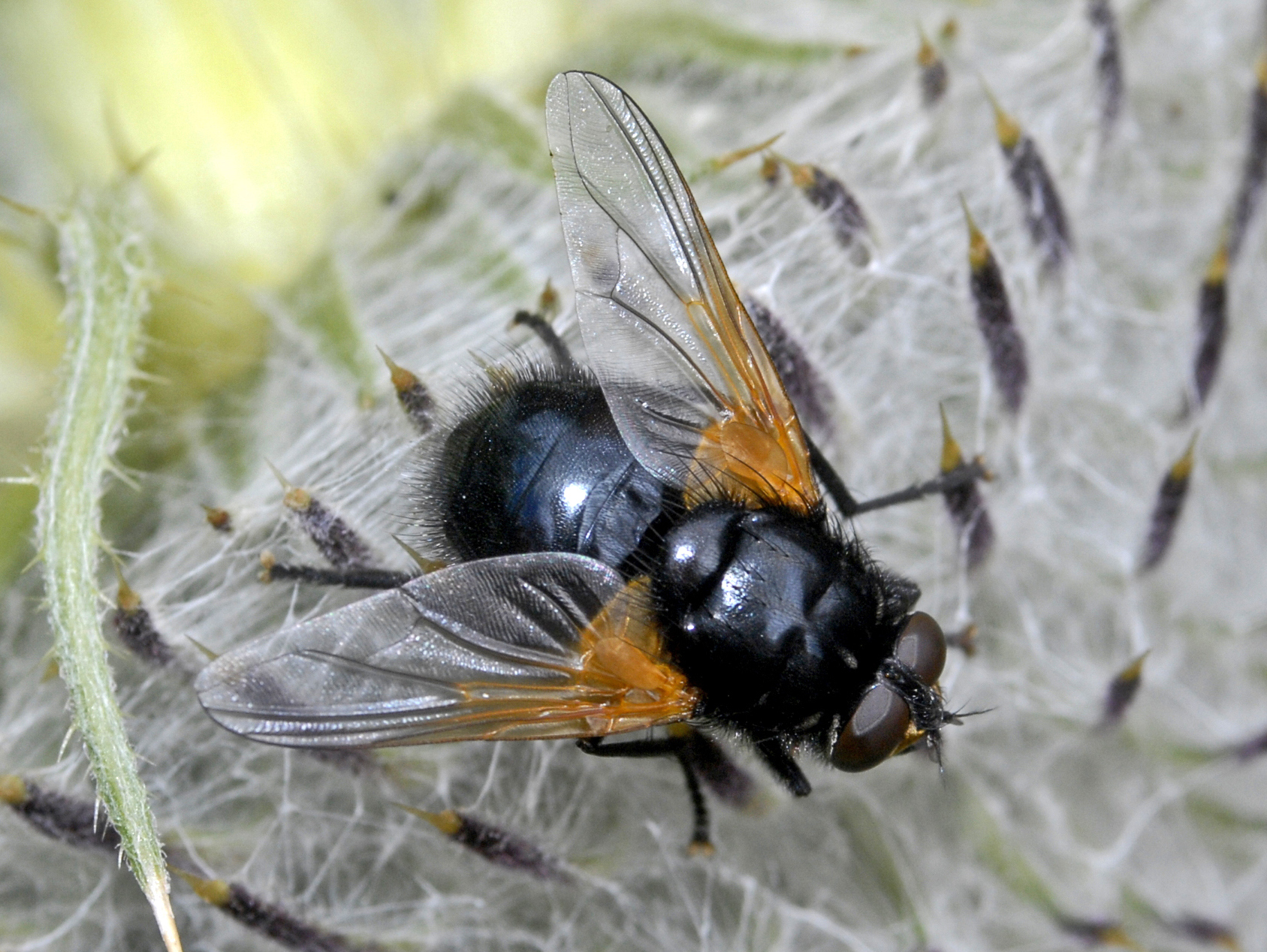
Dorsal view

Mesembrina meridiana can reach a length of 9–13 millimetres (0.35–0.51 in). These medium large flies have a stout body. Thorax and abdomen are shiny black, covered with uniform black hair. Numerous bristles are present on the edge of the scutellum. Occiput has no yellow hairiness. Eyes are bare and the cheeks under the eyes are covered with fine yellow short hairs. Orbits are separated by a wide black space. Antennae and palps are black, but arista is yellow. An orange colouration is present on the base of the wings, on the feet and the face.

This species can be easily confused with Mesembrina resplendens and Mesembrina intermedia.

== Biology ==
Video clip of M. meridiana feeding on flowers

This species is ovoviviparous, as the eggs hatch prior or within an hour after deposition. The female lays up to five eggs in a lifetime, each one in a different pat, at two-day intervals. Eggs are laid in cow dung.

Adults can be found between late April and late October, particularly in cattle-rearing areas, on cow dung or basking in open ground. They mate in cow or horse dung. They feed on nectar and pollen of flowers of plants, especially Apiaceae (Heracleum and Pastinaca species), or on overripe berries. The larvae are carnivorous, and feed on other fly larvae within the dung.

== Gallery ==
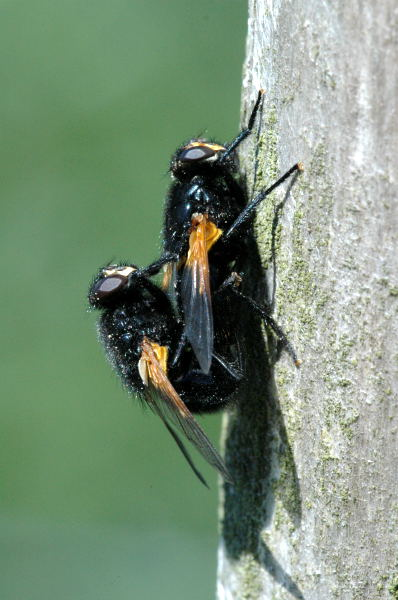
Mating

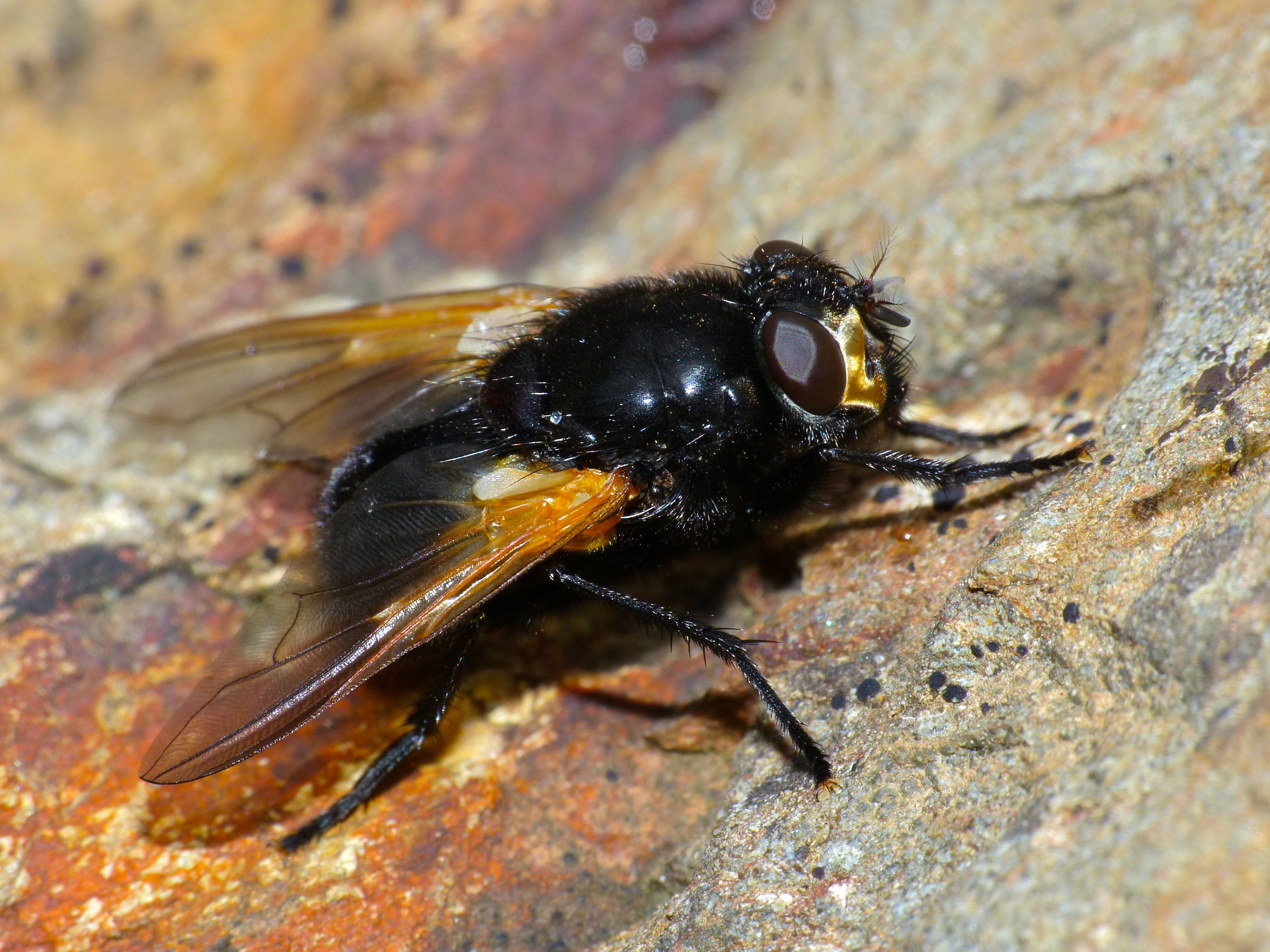
♀ Female

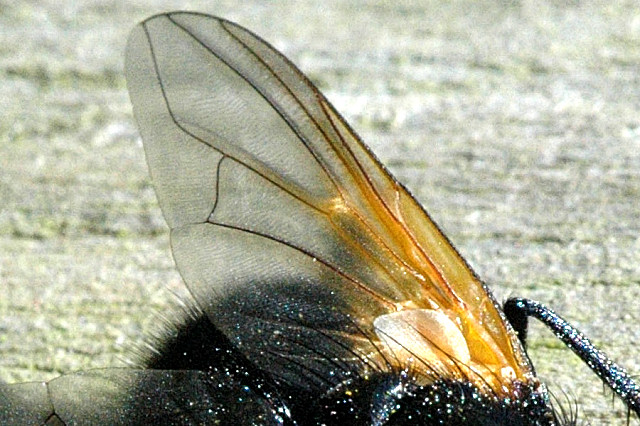
Detail of a wing

== Bibliography ==
- Colyer, C.N., & Hammond, C.O. (1968). Flies of the British Isles, ed. 2, Frederick Warne & Co., London
- Michael Chinery, Insectes de France et d'Europe occidentale, Paris, Flammarion, août 2012, 320 p. (ISBN 978-2-0812-8823-2), p. 214-215
