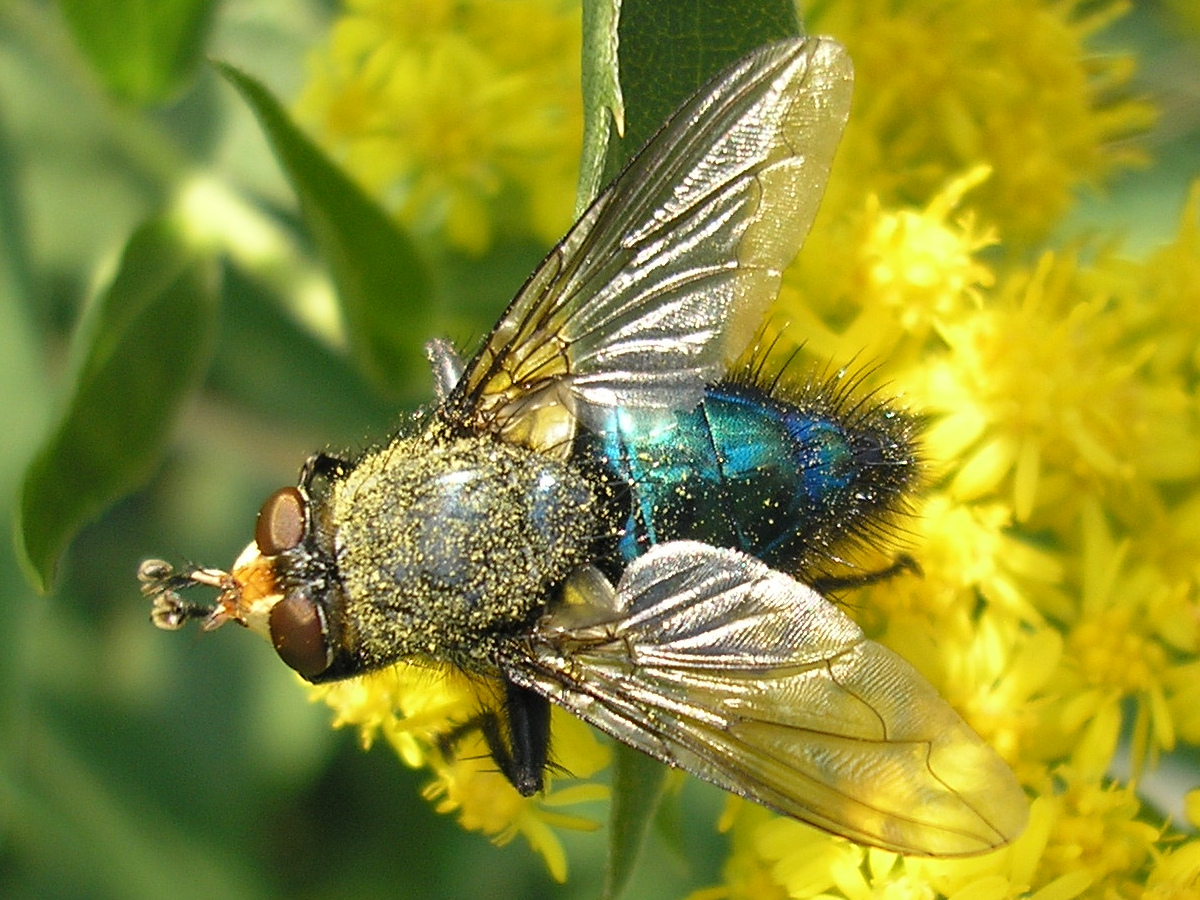
- Cynomya mortuorum

Scientific classification
- Domain: Eukaryota
- Kingdom: Animalia
- Phylum: Arthropoda
- Class: Insecta
- Order: Diptera
- Family: Calliphoridae
- Subfamily: Calliphorinae
- Tribe: Calliphorini
- Genus: Cynomya; Robineau-Desvoidy, 1830

Type species
- Musca mortuorum Linnaeus, 1761

Species
- C. cadaverina Robineau-Desvoidy, 1830; C. gregorpovolnyi Cepelak & Cepelak, 1978; C. hirta Hough, 1898; C. mortuorum (Linnaeus, 1761); Sources: UniProt, FE, ITIS

Synonyms
- Cynomyopsis; Cynomyia Macquart, 1835

= Cynomya =

Genus of flies

Cynomya (Ancient Greek: κυνόμυια, romanized: kunomuia, lit. 'dog-fly') is a genus in the family Calliphoridae of flies.
