= Polietina =

Scientific classification
- Kingdom: Animalia
- Phylum: Arthropoda
- Clade: Pancrustacea
- Class: Insecta
- Order: Diptera
- Family: Muscidae
- Tribe: Muscini
- Genus: Polietina; Schnabl & Dziedzicki, 1911

Genus of flies

Polietina is a genus within the Diptera family Muscidae.

== Species ==
- P. major Albuquerque, 1956
- P. nigra (Couri & Carvalho, 1996)
- P. orbitalis (Srein, 1904)
- P. prima (Couri & Carvalho, 1990)
- P. pruinosa (Macquart, 1846)
- P. rubella (Wulp, 1896)
- P. wulpi Couri & Carvalho, 1997
