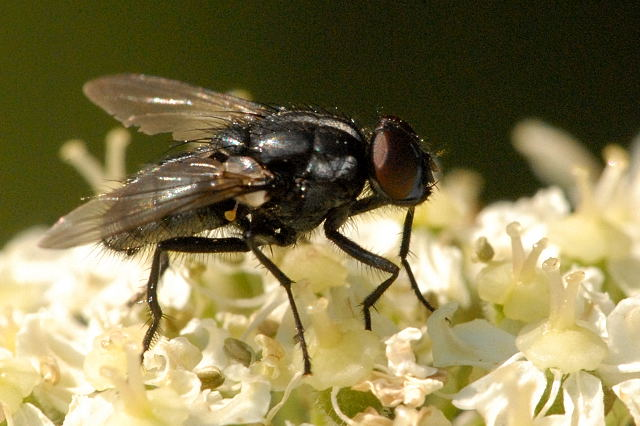

Scientific classification
- Kingdom: Animalia
- Phylum: Arthropoda
- Clade: Pancrustacea
- Class: Insecta
- Order: Diptera
- Family: Muscidae
- Genus: Morellia
- Species: M. podagrica

Binomial name
- Morellia podagrica (Loew, 1857)

= Morellia podagrica =

Species of fly

Morellia podagrica is a fly from the family Muscidae.
