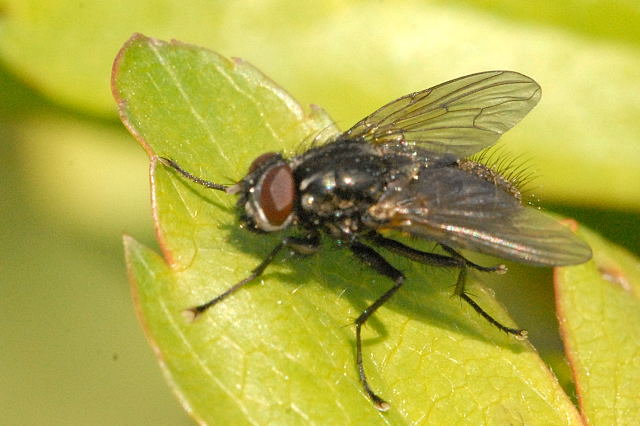
- Morellia aenescens

Scientific classification
- Kingdom: Animalia
- Phylum: Arthropoda
- Clade: Pancrustacea
- Class: Insecta
- Order: Diptera
- Family: Muscidae
- Genus: Morellia
- Species: M. aenescens

Binomial name
- Morellia aenescens Robineau-Desvoidy, 1830

Synonyms
- Curtonevra curvipes Macquart, 1834; Morellia curvipes (Macquart, 1834)

= Morellia aenescens =

Species of fly

Morellia aenescens is a fly from the family Muscidae.
