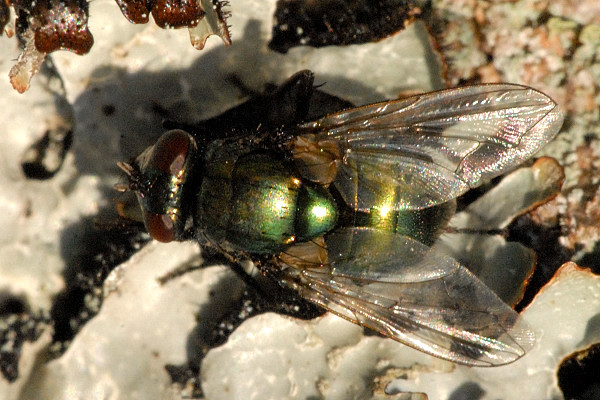

Scientific classification
- Kingdom: Animalia
- Phylum: Arthropoda
- Class: Insecta
- Order: Diptera
- Family: Muscidae
- Genus: Neomyia
- Species: N. viridescens

Binomial name
- Neomyia viridescens (Robineau-Desvoidy, 1830)

Synonyms
- Lucilia viridescens Robineau-Desvoidy, 1830

= Neomyia viridescens =

Species of fly

Neomyia viridescens is a species of fly which is distributed across many parts the Palaearctic.
