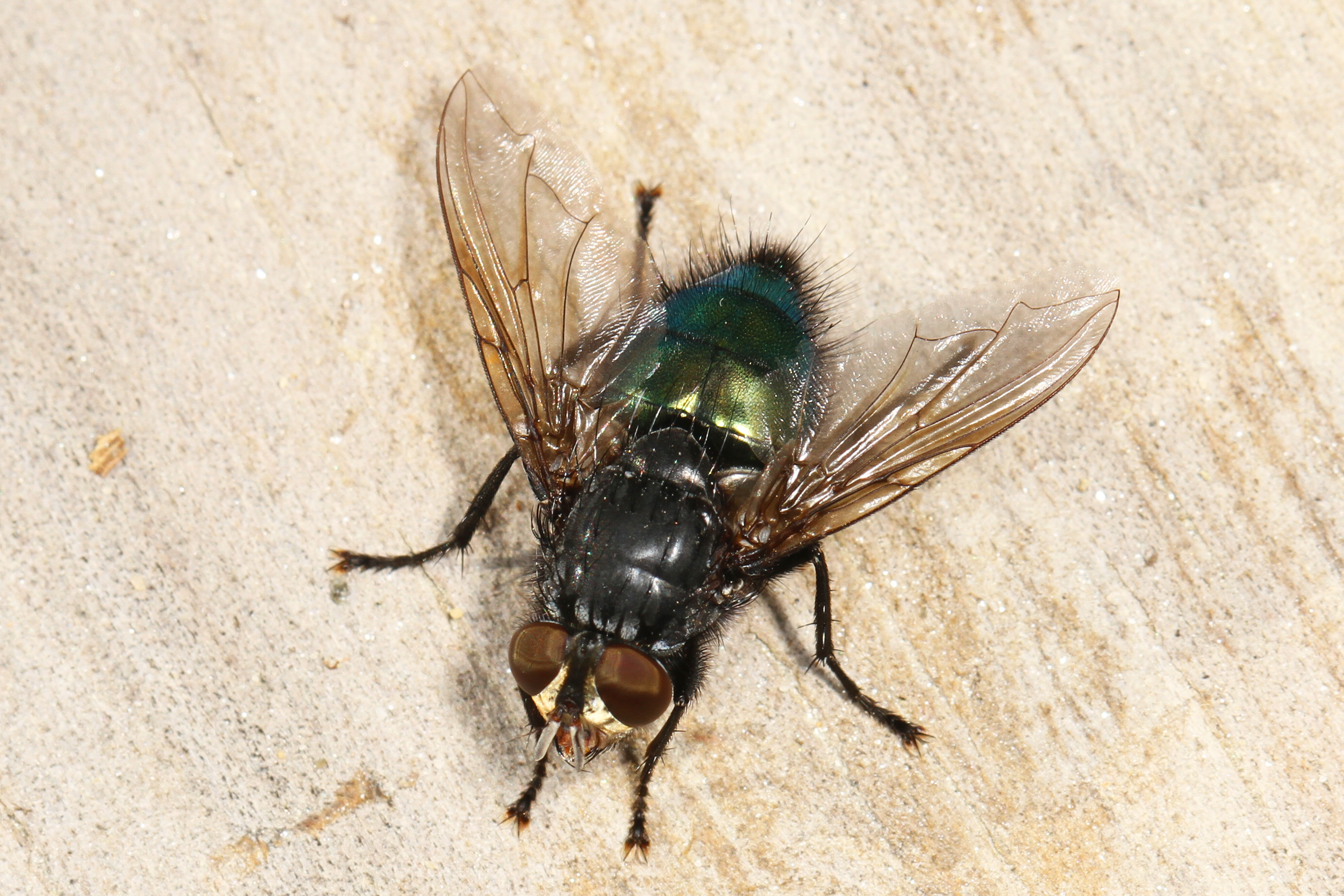

Scientific classification
- Kingdom: Animalia
- Phylum: Arthropoda
- Class: Insecta
- Order: Diptera
- Family: Calliphoridae
- Genus: Cynomya
- Species: C. cadaverina

Binomial name
- Cynomya cadaverina Robineau-Desvoidy, 1830

Synonyms
- Cynomyopsis cadaverina

= Cynomya cadaverina =

Species of fly

Cynomya cadaverina, also known as the shiny blue bottle fly, is a member of the family Calliphoridae, which includes blow flies as well as bottle flies. In recent years, this family has become a forensically important facet in many medicocriminal investigations in the growing field of forensic entomology. C. cadaverina is specifically important in determining a post-mortem interval, as well as other important factors.

== Taxonomy ==
Cynomya cadaverina was first described in 1830 by the French entomologist Jean-Baptiste Robineau-Desvoidy. Its epithet cadaverina is derived from the Latin word, meaning ‘(that feed on) dead bodies.’ This species is a member of the order Diptera and the diverse family Calliphoridae.

== Description ==
C. cadaverina is a fairly large species, ranging anywhere from 9-14 millimeters long. and has many characteristics that are common to its family, Calliphoridae. These characteristics include their metallic color, having bristles on their meron as well as having plumose arista. This species is known for having a shiny metallic blue abdomen for which it is named. It has a dark blue or black thorax and distinctive darker blue stripes present on the dorsum behind its head. Along with these other characteristics, C. cadaverina also has white calypters, a bare stem vein, and a parafacial with a ground color ranging from black to reddish brown with a yellow covering.

== Distribution ==
Cynomya cadaverina is known to range throughout the Neartic region with it being found mostly in southern Canada but also in the northern United States. Despite their normal location, they have also been found in states as far south as Florida and Texas. This species is known as a cool weather species and colonizes carrion in the highest numbers in the spring and fall months. In most cases, they overwinter as adults and may enter into houses during that time.

== Life cycle and development ==
Members of the order Diptera have a holometabolous lifecycle, meaning they go through four life stages: egg, larva, pupa and imago, or adult. C. cadaverina typically has around 17 generations of offspring per year with 25 to 50 eggs per generation if the right conditions are present. Temperature can have an extreme impact on development. If the temperature gets above or below a certain temperature it can cause all development of the fly to stop. In general, the warmer it is, the faster the lifecycle will go; while if it is colder, the lifecycle may take longer than usual. This has to be taken into account when estimating the postmortem interval.

Adults of C. cadaverina lay their eggs in open wounds or natural body openings on carrion, typically in small clusters or scattered singly. The eggs usually hatch out within 24 to 72 hours depending on the season. The eggs will then hatch into larvae that will go through three instars (stages). Each one of these stages is separated by a molt. During a molt, the larvae shed its outer layer in order to accommodate for new growth that comes with increased consumption of food needed for energy stores. The first instar typically lasts for approximately 20 hours, while the second instar lasts for 16 hours followed by the third instar for 72 hours. After the larvae have completed their development and stored as much energy as possible, they disperse to a safe area to complete their next stage, the pupal stage. This stage lasts for about 9 days before the fly finally emerges as an adult. The total lifecycle of C. cadaverina can take anywhere from 17–19 days depending on the temperature.

== Forensic and medical importance ==
=== Post-mortem interval estimation ===
PMI estimation is used to figure out how much time has elapsed since a person died by using insects to help estimate this interval. It depends on the species of insect, as some are attracted to fresh corpses while others are only attracted to the putrid and advanced stages of decomposition. This means the insects go through waves of succession. Using this information as well as the lifecycle of the insect in question can help to estimate the PMI. The judgment depends on what stage of development the insect is in, as well as the weather in recent months among other factors. Specifically with C. cadaverina, they tend to be attracted to fairly advanced stages of decomposition, while rarely being found on fresh carrion. They also tend to be in the second wave of succession, usually showing up after Lucilia spp. and Calliphora spp.

=== Myiasis and maggot therapy ===
Myiasis is the infestation of living or necrotic tissue in a living host by fly larvae. Some flies may just lay their eggs in a festering wound, while other may infest unwounded tissue. C. cadaverina has occasionally been found in cases of myiasis but is not a fly that is regularly found. Myiasis is fairly uncommon in the United States, but tends to be very common in third world countries and can create a major problem with livestock, causing severe economic losses. Myiasis is different from maggot therapy in which physicians purposely use larvae of flies that feed on necrotic tissue in order to clean up a wound and aid healing. Maggot therapy can clean up a wound that has been festering for months very quickly.

=== Mitochondrial DNA analysis ===
In recent years, there have been numerous research projects on the topic of mitochondrial DNA analysis in fly larvae. In cases where larvae have fed on human tissue, these larvae are collected and then the gut is dissected out. The mitochondrial DNA from the gut is analyzed and can lead to the identification of the corpse the maggot was feeding on as well as the species of the maggot itself. This information could be critical if the body was too decomposed to lead to identification, or in other situations where identification would be near to impossible. Research concerning mitochondrial DNA analysis is currently being conducted on C. cadaverina in order to aid in investigations.

=== Disease transmission ===
Cynomya cadaverina has been found to demonstrate communicative behavior via clustering and aggregation. It has been described by the U.S. Food and Drug Administration as being a part of the "filthy fly" category, as it tends to breed in excrement and thrives in filthy habitats. This fly can also pose a health hazard due to the transmission of enteric pathogens that can lead to foodborne diseases in humans.

== Future research ==
Further research is being conducted on Cynomya cadaverina to gain more information on its lifecycle as well as its behavior in order to better pinpoint time of death with postmortem interval estimation. This information will further aid forensic entomologists as well as investigators in solving medicocriminal investigations. Also, continued research on mitochondrial DNA analysis will be able to provide more identifications in cases where identification may have seemed impossible. Although Cynomya cadaverina is not as forensically or medically important as some of the other species of fly, it can still be a powerful tool in investigations as well as aid in maggot therapy.
