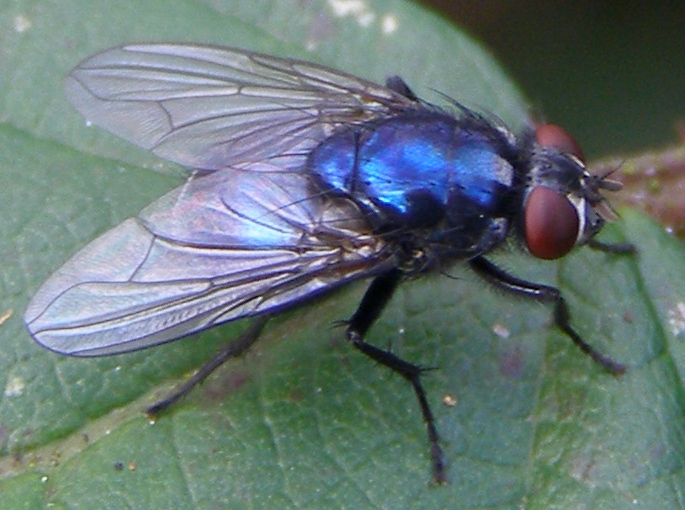
- Female Eudasyphora cyanicolor

Scientific classification
- Kingdom: Animalia
- Phylum: Arthropoda
- Class: Insecta
- Order: Diptera
- Family: Muscidae
- Genus: Eudasyphora
- Species: E. cyanicolor

Binomial name
- Eudasyphora cyanicolor (Zetterstedt, 1845)

Synonyms
- Pyrellia cyanicolor Zetterstedt, 1845

= Eudasyphora cyanicolor =

Species of fly

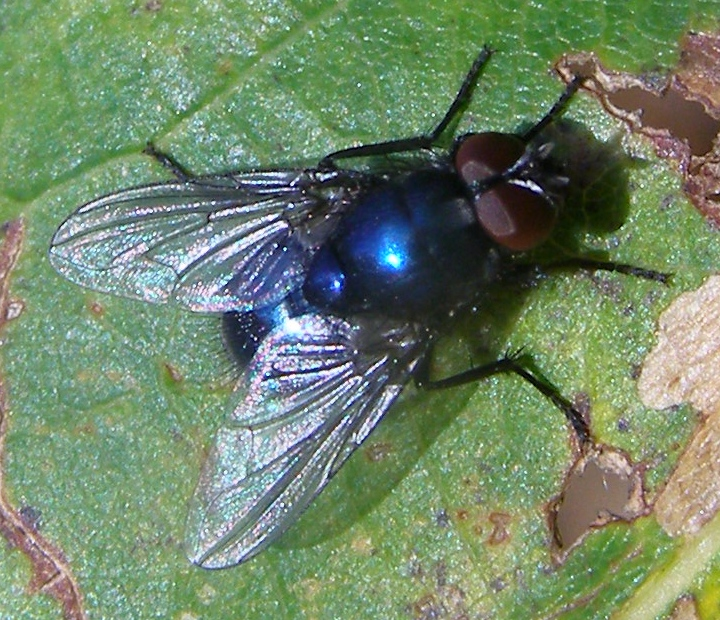
Male Eudasyphora cyanicolor

Eudasyphora cyanicolor is a species of fly which is distributed across many parts the Palaearctic.
