= Parafacial =

The parafacial or parafacialia is the area between ptilinal fissure and the compound eye of dipterans.
