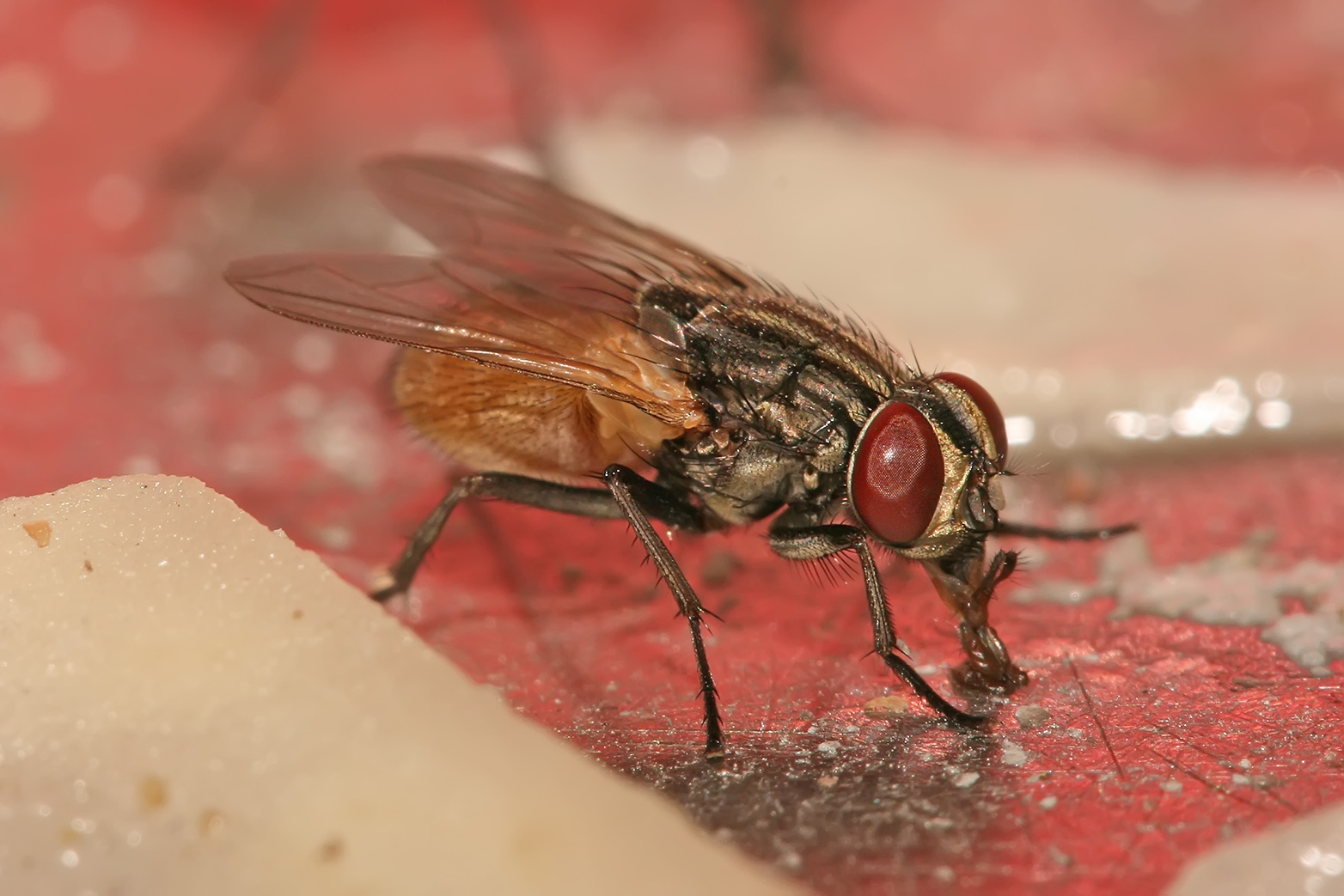
- Musca domestica

Scientific classification
- Kingdom: Animalia
- Phylum: Arthropoda
- Clade: Pancrustacea
- Class: Insecta
- Order: Diptera
- Family: Muscidae
- Subfamily: Muscinae
- Tribe: Muscini; Latreille, 1802

= Muscini =

Tribe of flies

Muscini is a tribe of flies from the family Muscidae.

== Genera ==
- Archaeopolietes Pont & Carvalho, 1997
- Biopyrellia Townsend, 1932
- Dasyphora Robineau-Desvoidy, 1830
- Eudasyphora Townsend, 1911
- Mesembrina Meigen, 1826
- Morellia Robineau-Desvoidy, 1830
- Musca Linnaeus, 1758
- Neomyia Walker, 1859
- Neorypellia Pont, 1972
- Parapyrellia Townsend, 1915
- Polietes Rondani, 1866
- Polietina Schnabl & Dziedzicki, 1911
- Pyrellia Robineau-Desvoidy, 1830
- Sarcopromusca Townsend, 1927
- Trichomorellia Stein, 191
- Xenomorellia Malloch, 1923
