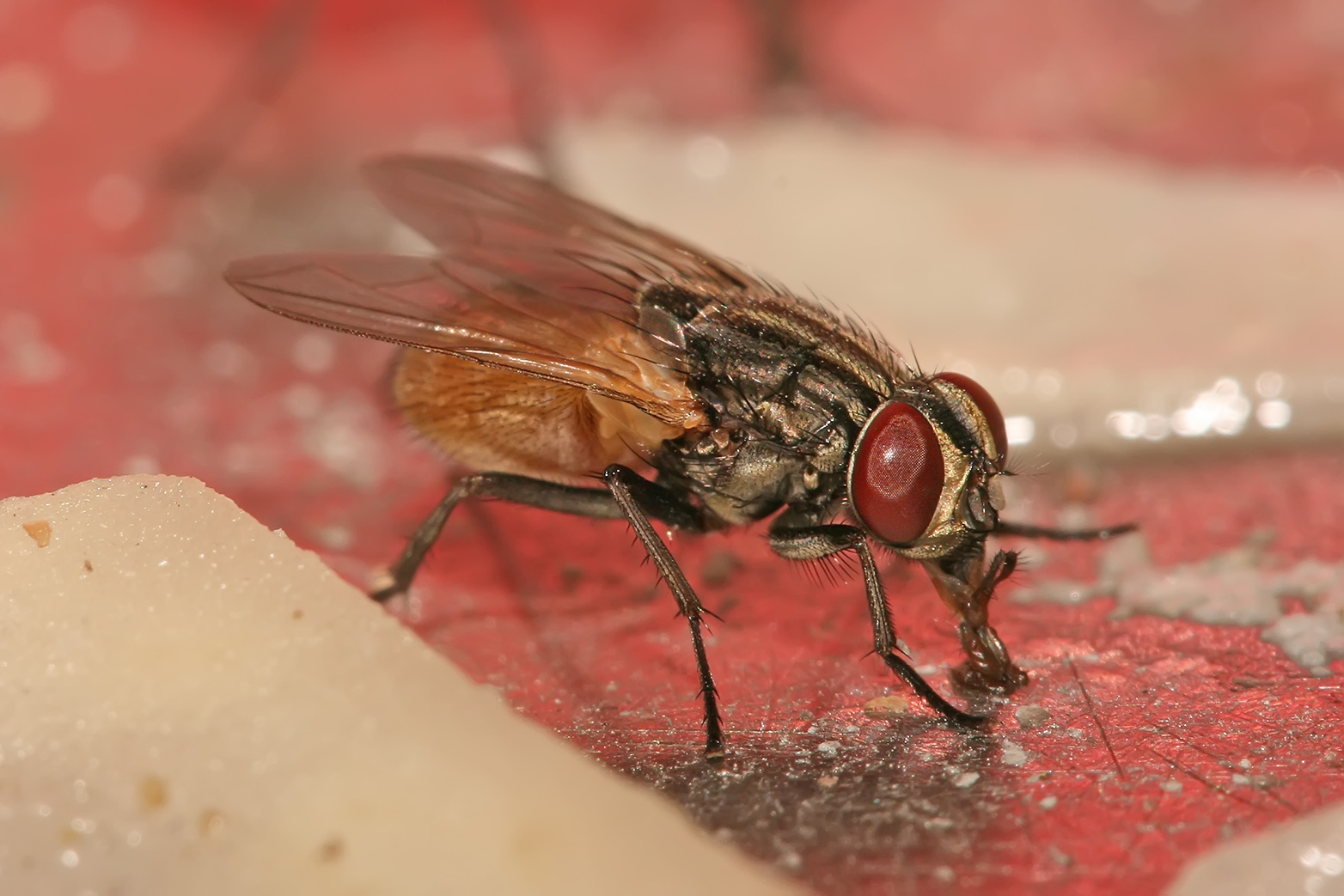
- Housefly, Musca domestica

Scientific classification
- Kingdom: Animalia
- Phylum: Arthropoda
- Clade: Pancrustacea
- Class: Insecta
- Order: Diptera
- Family: Muscidae
- Subfamily: Muscinae; Latreille, 1802

Tribes
- Muscini; Stomoxyini

= Muscinae =

Subfamily of flies

Muscinae is a subfamily of the family Muscidae. It includes two of the more familiar genera within the Muscidae family; Musca and Stomoxys.

The bulk of the species are in the tribe Muscini.

From the 19th century, the term "Muscinae" is also an obsolete scientific name for the mosses (modern Bryophyta), once used in the taxonomy of Ernst Haeckel (circa 1899).

== Identification ==
The tip of the scutellum is reddish, cell R5 is somewhat narrowed distally, and all coxae black.
