= Thelazia californiensis =

Scientific classification
- Domain: Eukaryota
- Kingdom: Animalia
- Phylum: Nematoda
- Class: Chromadorea
- Order: Rhabditida
- Family: Thelaziidae
- Genus: Thelazia
- Species: T. californiensis

Binomial name
- Thelazia californiensis Price, 1930

Species of roundworm

Thelazia californiensis is a nematode that originates in the genus Thelazia, which comes from phylum Nematoda. This worm has been known to cause Thelaziasis in hosts.

== Morphology ==
As with most Thelazia worms, they are small parasites that average about 12-13 mm long. To differentiate between other members of this genus, T. californiensis has a vulva that opens mid-ventrally, while T. callipaeda has an anterior vulva.

=== Hosts ===
Similar to Thelazia callipaeda, the worm has definitive hosts in dogs, cats, sheep, and occasionally humans. They also use intermediate hosts to move around, specifically using the lesser house fly (Fannia canicularis).

==== Life cycle ====
The worm starts its life cycle by laying eggs in the tears and tear ducts of the host and the eggs are picked up by the flies. Because the eggs develop into larvae inside the fly, it is a parenthetic host. After developing in the fly, the larvae move so they can easily escape the fly's mouth when it feeds again, starting the cycle over.

===== Symptoms =====
Both the adult and larval stages cause disease in the eye, which can have different levels of pain and discomfort. Some of the problems include keratitis, ulcers, conjunctivitis, and other afflictions.

====== Diagnosis and treatment ======
As with other eyeworms, the course of diagnosis is to exam the eye and spot any worms that are moving around. In some cases, microscopes can be used to look at tear fluid to see eggs or larvae. Treatment consists of pulling the worms out with forceps in humans. Some cases of infection have shown promising results by using ivermectin.
