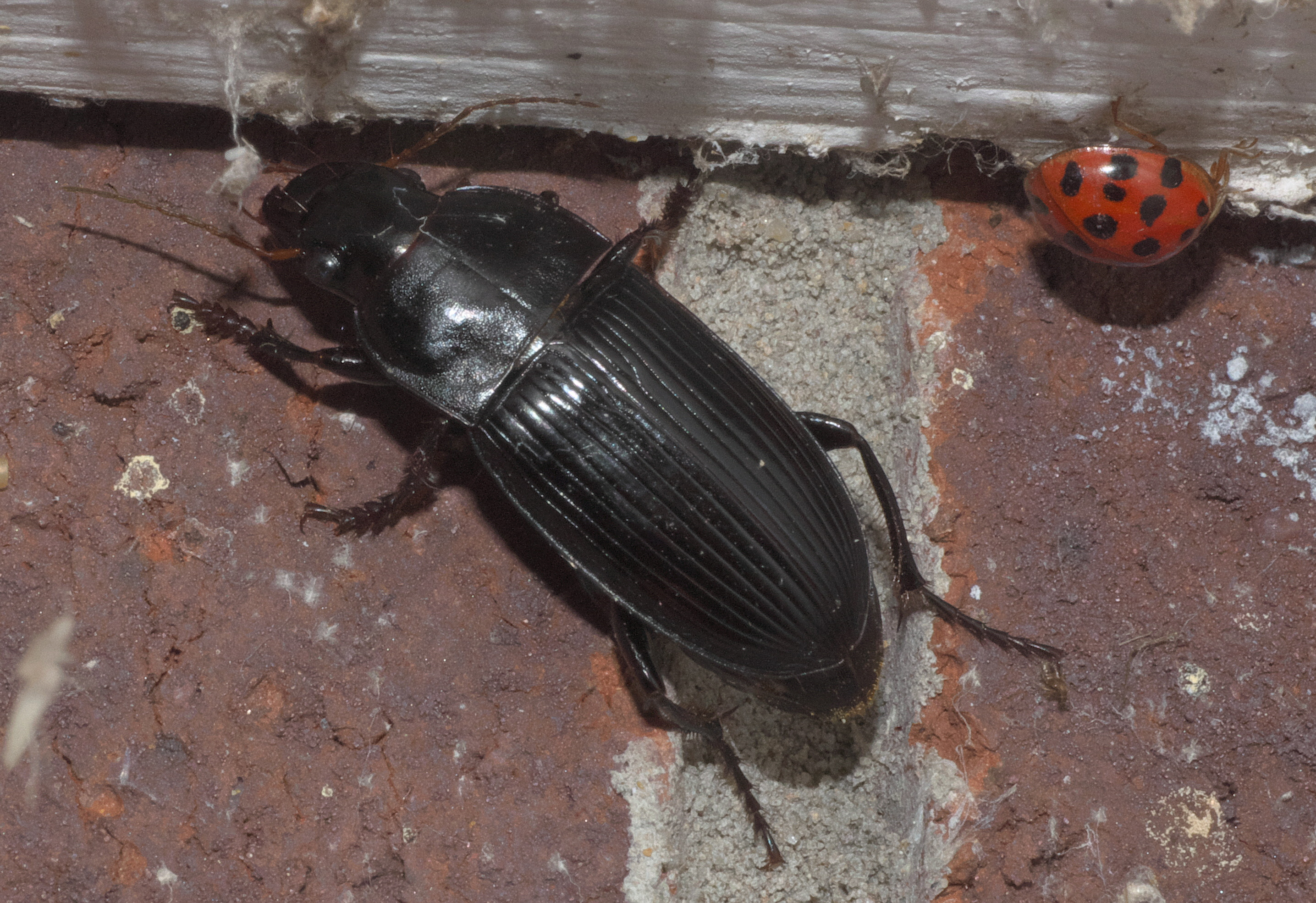

Scientific classification
- Kingdom: Animalia
- Phylum: Arthropoda
- Class: Insecta
- Order: Coleoptera
- Suborder: Adephaga
- Family: Carabidae
- Genus: Harpalus
- Species: H. caliginosus

Binomial name
- Harpalus caliginosus (Fabricius, 1775)

= Harpalus caliginosus =

Species of beetle

Harpalus caliginosus is a species of ground beetle in the subfamily Harpalinae. It was described by Johan Christian Fabricius in 1775. It's a known predator of Musca autumnalis larvae.
