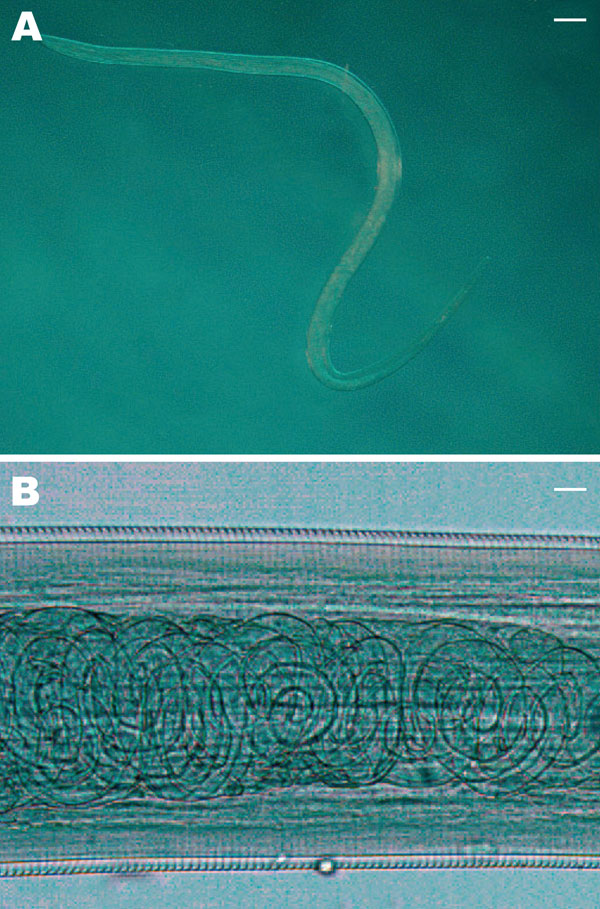
- Thelazia callipaeda female

Scientific classification
- Kingdom: Animalia
- Phylum: Nematoda
- Class: Chromadorea
- Order: Rhabditida
- Family: Thelaziidae
- Genus: Thelazia; Bosc, 1819

Species
- See text

= Thelazia =

Genus of roundworms

Thelazia is a genus of nematode worms which parasitize the eyes and associated tissues of various bird and mammal hosts, including humans. They are often called "eyeworms", and infestation with Thelazia species is referred to as "thelaziasis" (occasionally spelled "thelaziosis"). Adults are usually found in the eyelids, tear glands, tear ducts, or the so-called "third eyelid" (nictitating membrane). Occasionally, they are found in the eyeball itself, either under the conjunctiva (the membrane that covers the white part of the eye) or in the vitreous cavity of the eyeball. All species of Thelazia for which the life cycle has been studied are transmitted by species of Diptera (flies) which do not bite, but which feed on tears.

== Representative species ==
- Thelazia anolabiata (Molin, 1860)
  - Definitive hosts: Andean cock-of-the-rock (Rupicola peruviana) and many other Brazilian birds
  - Intermediate hosts: Not known
  - Distribution: South America
- Thelazia bubalis Ramanujachari and Alwar, 1952
  - Definitive hosts: Water buffalo
  - Intermediate hosts: Not known
  - Distribution: India
- Thelazia californiensis Price, 1930
  - Definitive hosts: Dog (Canis familiaris), cat (Felis catus), occasionally human (Homo sapiens), domestic sheep (Ovis aries), mule deer (Odocoileus hemionus), coyote (Canis latrans) and American black bear (Ursus americanus).
  - Intermediate hosts: Lesser house fly (Fannia canicularis) and Fannia benjamini
  - Distribution: Western North America
- Thelazia callipaeda Railliet & Henry, 1910 (sometimes called "Oriental eyeworm")
  - Definitive hosts: Typically reported from dog (Canis familiaris), cat (Felis catus), and occasionally reported from grey wolf (Canis lupus), raccoon dog (Nyctereutes procyonoides), red fox (Vulpes vulpes), European rabbit (Oryctolagus cuniculus). Over 250 cases of T. callipaeda infestation in humans have been reported thus far.
  - Intermediate hosts: Fruit flies (Amiota (Phortica) variegata in Europe, and Phortica okadai in China)
  - Distribution: Asia and Europe
- Thelazia erschowi Oserskaja, 1931
  - Definitive hosts: Pig (Sus domesticus)
  - Intermediate host: Not known
  - Distribution: Post-Soviet states
- Thelazia gulosa (Railliet & Henry, 1910)
  - Definitive hosts: Yak (Bos grunniens) and other cattle (Bos taurus), and rarely human (Homo sapiens)
  - Intermediate hosts: Face fly (Musca autumnalis) in Europe and North America, Musca larvipara in Ukraine, Musca vitripennis in Crimea, and Musca amica in the Far East
  - Distribution: Asia, Europe, and North America
- Thelazia lacrymalis (Gurlt, 1831)
  - Definitive hosts: Horse (Equus caballus) and cattle (Bos taurus)
  - Intermediate hosts: Face fly (Musca autumnalis) and Musca osiris
  - Distribution: Asia, Europe, Middle East, North America and South America
- Thelazia leesei Railliet & Henry, 1910
  - Definitive hosts: Dromedary (Camelus dromedarius) and Bactrian camel (Camelus bactrianus)
  - Intermediate hosts: Flies (Musca lucidulus)
  - Distribution: Post-Soviet states and India
- Thelazia rhodesii (Desmarest, 1828)
  - Definitive hosts: mainly bovids, cattle (Bos taurus), water buffalo (Bubalus bubalis), zebu (Bos indicus), bison (Bison bonasus), and sometimes horse (Equus caballus), domestic sheep (Ovis aries), dromedary (Camelus dromedarius), and goat (Capra hircus)
  - Intermediate hosts: Face fly (Musca autumnalis, Musca larvipara, and Musca sorbens)
  - Distribution: Africa, Asia, and Europe
- Thelazia skrjabini Erschow, 1928
  - Definitive hosts: Cattle (Bos taurus) and yak (Bos grunniens)
  - Intermediate hosts: Face fly (Musca autumnalis), Musca vitripennis, and Musca amica
  - Distribution: Europe and North America

== Human infections/cases ==
Thelazia anolabiata

Thelazia anolabiata is a spirurid nematode living in the orbits of birds which can cause lacrimation, keratitis, conjunctivitis, and corneal ulcers. This species is reported for the first time from an Andean Cock of the Rock, Rupicola peruviana (Passeriformes: Cotingidae), from a zoo in Lima, Peru. Clinical signs of keratoconjunctivitis were resolved with the treatment of ivermectin, ciprofloxacin, and an epithelium regenerator, and the host is presently in good health. The nematodes were identified using the primary characteristics used to differentiate the species of this genus as lengths of spicules and other morphologic characteristics.

Thelazia californiensis

The eyeworm Thelazia californiensis is a spiruroid nematode. It was first described by Price in 1930, as a parasite of dogs in the western United States. T. Californiensis can infest dogs, cats, sheep, deer and other mammals and causes a disease known as thelaziasis. This is not a common disease. This eyeworm commonly parasitizes in the tear ducts and conjunctival sac of its hosts, and appears as a creamy, thin-white thread measuring slightly over a half an inch in length. The adult worms may be found in the conjunctival sac or tear ducts. The eggs or larvae can be seen when the tears or secretions are examined under the microscope. The eyeworms are most common on the Pacific Coast. Humans can become infested, but it is extremely rare and thought to be accidental. There are only a few reports of Thelazia californiensis infestation in humans.

Thelazia callipaeda

Thelazia callipaeda eye worm is a nematode transmitted by drosophilid flies not only primarily to carnivores and lagomorphs but also to humans. Only a few cases have been reported in Europe (Italy, France, and Portugal). Here, we report the first eye infection in a German patient.

Thelazia gulosa

Thelazia gulosa, the cattle eyeworm, was found in the left eye of a 26-year-old woman from Oregon in 2018. This case was the first-ever reported human infection from this genus. The ten previous cases reported from the United States were caused by Thelazia californiensis. Human infections caused by Thelazia callipaeda have also been reported in Japan, China, India, Taiwan, Burma, Thailand, Korea, Indonesia, Italy, Russia, and France.

The 26-year-old woman had been practicing horsemanship in Gold Beach, Oregon, which is a region where cattle farming is common. After a few weeks, her left eye started to feel irritated followed by a sensation of a foreign object. On the eighth day of her symptoms, she found and removed a small, translucent worm from her eye. She went to a local physician, who found and removed two more worms. These worms were sent to Northwest Pathology for analysis and identification. It was then forwarded to the Center for Disease Control and Prevention (CDC) Parasitic Diseases Reference Laboratory for identification.

The next day, the woman went to an optometrist where three more worms were removed. She was sent to see an infectious disease specialist, who was able to remove a partial worm. The patient was diagnosed with parasitic infiltration of the left periocular tissues and a secondary bilateral papillary reaction of the upper and lower palpebral conjunctive. Even after multiple washouts by ophthalmologists, no more worms were seen, but the patient continued to remove additional worms from her eye. Over 20 days, a total of 14 worms were removed. Since then, the patient no longer had any symptoms and no more worms were detected.

Thelazia lacrymalis

Equine thelaziosis is a neglected vector-borne parasitic disease in modern veterinary medicine, lacking recent reports. It is transmitted by Musca autumnalis, and potentially other Muscidae species, by ingesting the lachrymal secretions of its equine host. The distribution of both Thelazia lacrymalis and its intermediate hosts remains largely unknown throughout Europe, with most studies dating back 20 years. The aim of this study was to assess the presence, prevalence and distribution of T. lacrymalis in horses from Romania.

Thelazia skrjabini

Examination of 122 eyes and 162 nasolachrymal ducts of cattle over 8 years old in Denmark revealed Thelazia skrjabini in 2 cows. This is the first record of Thelazia in Denmark.

== See also ==
- Nematode
- John Stoffolano
