= Herbert J. Teskey =

Canadian entomologist

Herbert (Herb) J. Teskey (born Grand Prairie, Alberta, 9 June 1928; died Ottawa, 16 February 1998) was a Canadian entomologist.

== Education ==
Teskey took a B.Sc. at the University of Alberta in 1951, followed by an M.S.A. at the Ontario Agriculture College in 1955. In 1967 he completed a Ph.D. at Cornell University on larval Tabanidae.

== Career ==
In 1951, Teskey was appointed to Agriculture Canada's Medical and Veterinary Entomology Research Laboratory, based in Guelph, studying Oestridae, face flies (Musca autumnalis De Geer), and other insects harmful to livestock. He transferred in 1964 to the Diptera Unit, based in Ottawa, continuing his works on Tabanidae, along with the early life-stages of other Diptera. He published thirty-two new Diptera taxa (including 3 genus-group names and 29 species-group names).

== Works ==
Teskey (co-)wrote fifty-one scientific studies. Key works included:

- contributions to Manual of Nearctic Diptera. Vol. 1, ed. by J.F., McAlpine B.V., Peterson G.E., Shewell H.J., Teskey J.R., Vockeroth D.M., Wood. Agriculture Canada Monograph No. 27
- Teskey, H. J. (1990). The horse flies and deer flies of Canada and Alaska (PDF). The insects and arachnids of Canada, 16. Ottawa: Canadian Government Publishing Centre. ISBN 978-0-660-13282-2.
