= Thelaziasis =

- Other names: Thelaziosis
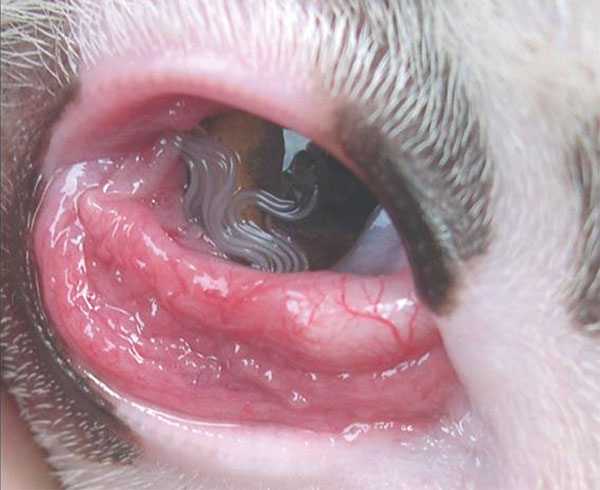
- Thelazia callipaeda infestation in a dog
- Specialty: Infectious disease

Thelaziasis is the term for infestation with parasitic nematodes of the genus Thelazia. The adults of all Thelazia species discovered so far inhabit the eyes and associated tissues (such as eyelids, tear ducts, etc.) of various mammal and bird hosts, including humans. Thelazia nematodes are often referred to as "eyeworms".

== Signs and symptoms ==
In animal and human hosts, infestation by Thelazia may be asymptomatic, though it frequently causes watery eyes (epiphora), conjunctivitis, corneal opacity, or corneal ulcers (ulcerative keratitis). Infested humans have also reported "foreign body sensation" – the feeling that something is in the eye.

== Cause ==
=== Life cycle ===
In the uterus of the adult female, the embryos develop into first-stage larvae (L1), which remain in the eggshell (sheath). The female deposits these sheathed larvae in the tears of the mammal or bird definitive host, and the larvae are ingested by tear-feeding flies. In the fly, the larvae "hatch" (exsheath), penetrate the gut wall, and migrate to either the fat body, testes or egg follicles (depending on the species). There they develop into third-stage larvae (L3), which migrate to the head of the fly. The infective L3 larvae wiggle out of the straw-like feeding apparatus of the fly when it feeds on the tears of another mammal or bird host. The L3 larvae develop into adults in the eye or surrounding tissues of the host, where they may live for over one year.

In the definitive host, Thelazia have been found in various tissues of the orbit (or socket) of the eye, including within the eyelids, in the tear glands, tear ducts, or the so-called "third eyelid" (nictitating membrane) or in the eyeball itself.

=== Hosts and geographic range ===
While a few dozen species of Thelazia have been described in the literature, only three have been reported to infest humans, and only seven are commonly reported in veterinary contexts. The remaining species are occasionally found in birds or wild mammals.

In humans, dogs and cats, thelaziasis cases due to Thelazia callipaeda (Asia, Europe), and occasionally T. californiensis and T. gulosa (western North America), have been reported.

Horses are infested by T. lacrymalis (worldwide) and, less frequently, by T. rhodesii (Africa, Asia, Europe).

In cattle, T. gulosa (Asia, Europe, North America), T. rhodesii (Africa, Asia, Europe) and T. skrjabini (Europe, North America) are the primary species of concern.

In camels, T. leesei infestations have been reported from the Post-Soviet states and India.

The intermediate hosts of several Thelazia species are known, and in each case they are tear-feeding flies of the genera Musca (family Muscidae), Phortica (family Drosophilidae), or Fannia (family Fanniidae).

== Diagnosis ==
Diagnosis involves simply examining the eyes and nearby tissues for the worms. Adult Thelazia are very active; one author described T. californiensis as a "short lively piece of nylon fishing line about 10 mm long."

== Treatment ==
Because they live so close to the outside of the body, Thelazia is one of the few nematode infections which can be treated topically.

Topical treatment of livestock, dogs and cats with organophosphates (such as ecothiopate iodide or isofluorophate) and systemic treatment with anthelmintics (such as ivermectin, levamisole, and doramectin) are recommended by the Merck Veterinary Manual. Other sources have reported positive results treating dogs with moxidectin, imidacloprid, or milbemycin oxime.

For the treatment of human cases, removal of the worm is suggested. Topical treatment with cocaine or thiabendazole have also been reported to kill the worms in human cases. Because most, if not all, species of Thelazia are spread by flies, sanitary practices which reduce the presence of flies will also reduce the spread of thelaziasis.

In canines, prevention against canine thelaziosis by monthly administrations of a combination of milbemycin oxime and afoxolaner (NexGard Spectra) has been found effective.

== Prevalence ==
By one author's count, 257 human cases of Thelazia callipaeda had been reported worldwide by the year 2000, though thelaziasis is still considered to be a rare disease.

Various livestock and wildlife surveys suggest that thelaziasis is quite common among animals.

- A 1978 slaughterhouse survey in Guelph, Ontario, Canada found that about one-third (32%) of cattle over an eight-month period were infested with eyeworms.
- A survey of horses in Kentucky revealed a 42% rate of infestation with Thelazia lacrymalis.
- In Wyoming and Utah, a survey of hunter-harvested mule deer found 15% to be infested by Thelazia californiensis.
- A survey of various sites in Italy found 23-60% of dogs, 5% of foxes and 4 out of 4 cats to be infested with Thelazia callipaeda.
- In a study of dogs living in western Spain, 39.9% of the dogs were found to have Thelazia callipaeda worms living in their eyes.
