= John Stoffolano =

American entomologist

John G. Stoffolano
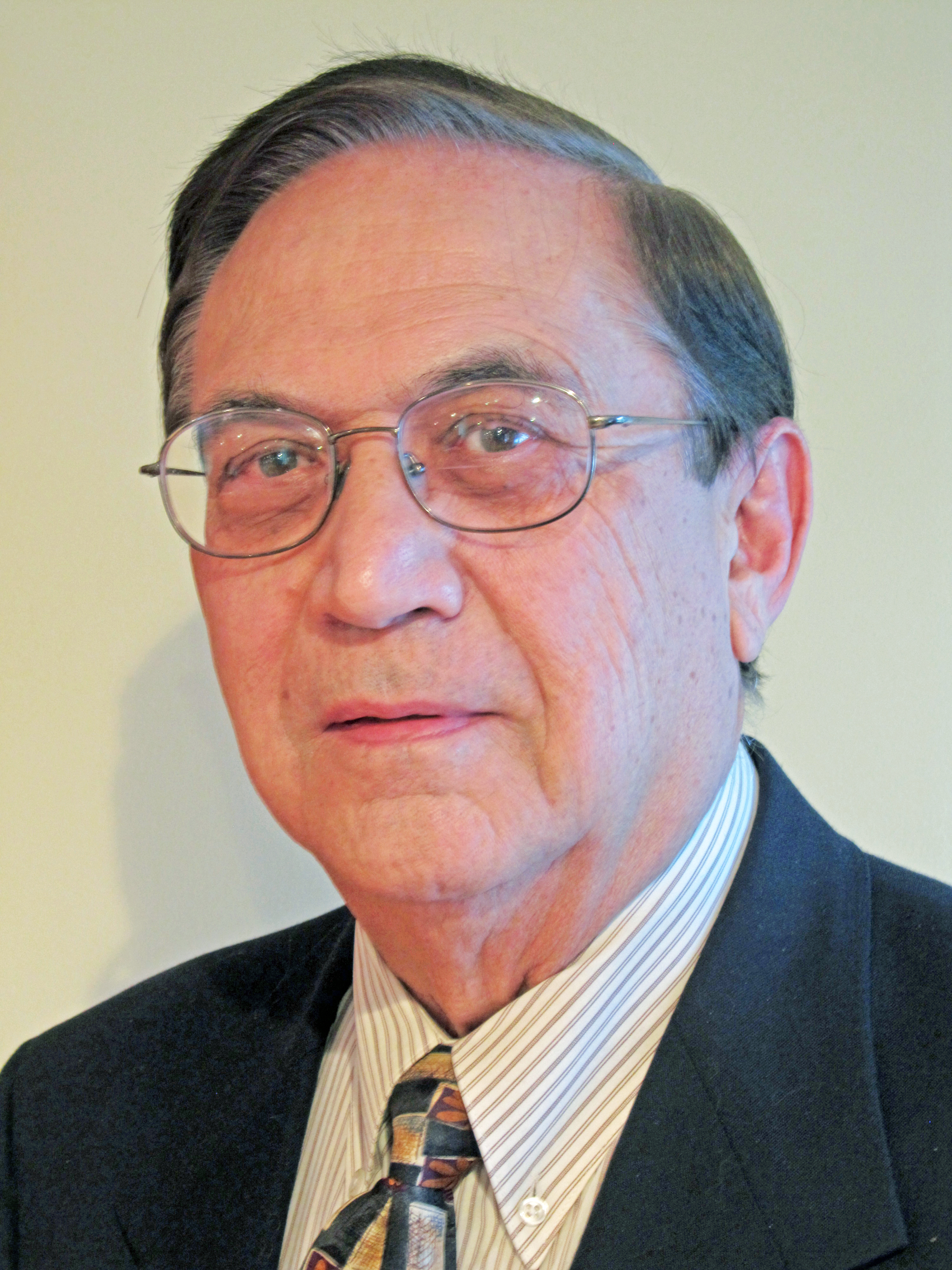
- Born: December 31, 1939 (age 86); Gloversville, N. Y.
- Occupation: Entomologist
- Medical career
- Research: Entomology

John G. Stoffolano, Jr. (born December 31, 1939) is an American entomologist specializing in non-biting fly behavior, physiology, and veterinary issues of flies as vectors of pathogens.

Stoffolano was the first to discover the eye worm parasite (Thelazia) found in dairy cattle in the United States and published the paper with the nematologist MayBelle Chitwood. He was also the first to discover a new species of nematode (Heterotylenchus autumnalis, in the face fly, Musca autumnalis, now Perionychium autumnale), which was initially described by William Nickle of the USDA. He joined the faculty of the Department of Entomology at the University of Massachusetts in 1969 and was one of the first N.S.F. postdoctoral fellows, which he took with the insect sensory physiologist, Vincent Dethier. After Princeton for one year (1970–1971), he returned to the University of Massachusetts, where he has been since.

== Early life and education ==
John Stoffolano was born on December 31, 1939, in Gloversville, New York, the son of John Stoffolano, Sr. and Elvenus Smith, originally of Nelliston, New York. Following graduation from Oneonta College, Stoffolano taught 8th grade English and Math for one half a year at Oppenheim-Ephratah-St. Johnsville Consolidated School. From 1962 to 1964, he became one of three high school biology teachers at Oneonta High School. Stoffolano entered a master's degree program in entomology in the Department of Entomology, which was housed in Comstock Hall at Cornell University with George Matthysse, the world authority on ticks, and graduated in 1962. His thesis research was on the major introduced pest, the face fly, Musca autumnalis, an eye pest of cattle and horses in the U.S. He was the first to study the overwintering habit, or diapause, of these flies, during which time he discovered the Thelazia eye worm nematodes. Upon completing his M.S. degree, he entered a Ph.D. program in the Entomology Department at the University of Connecticut and graduated in 1970 under the supervision of Fred Streams. During his studies, he was mentored by neuroanatomist Norman Davis. Stoffolano joined the faculty at the University of Massachusetts in 1969 and took a sabbatical with Dethier at Princeton from 1970 to 1971.

== Career ==
Stoffolano spent several sabbatical leaves in research laboratories in different countries and spent a sabbatical in London at the Pest Oversea Research Locust Laboratory, researching the feeding behavior of locusts with Reginald Chapman. During his studies of the fly crop, he became the first to show that the crop was more than just a storage organ for flies but was involved in many more important functions, such as serving as a vehicle for important pathogens of both humans and domestic animals and regulating blood sugar levels in flies. While at the University of Massachusetts, Stoffolano extended his research to understanding more about the behavior and blood feeding of the greenhead horsefly, Tabanus nigrovittatus, which is a constant nuisance along the Atlantic Coast. His extensive studies on this fly earned him the title Lord of the Flies, and he was featured in an article in Yankee Magazine (2013). With one of his students, they were the first to demonstrate that what was originally thought of as one species of greenhead was really two, which was based on egg-laying behavioral differences. In 1995, with a group of colleagues, they discovered a new hormone in flies, which was JHIII. His interest in fly anatomy resulted in the important discovery that the cuticular abdominal placques on certain adult Diptera were key to the evolution of specific dipterous groups.

Stoffolano was involved in organizing the first workshop on education for the Entomological Society of America, following which the society created a new section on education. In 1978, he received the distinguished teaching award from the Entomological Society of America. During his time at the University of Massachusetts, he taught Insect Biology, Using Insects in the Classroom, Insect Physiology, Insect Behavior, and an honors course (The Impact of Insects on Human Culture). Stoffolano was the first faculty member of the University of Massachusetts system to offer a course via distance learning, with 200 elementary school teachers from numerous states taking the course online via PicTel and the Massachusetts Corporation for Educational Telecommunications. He continued to extend his research interest by taking sabbaticals at various international laboratories and establishing collaborative research. During his career, he was responsible for research demonstrating that adult houseflies could vector-store pathogens in their diverticulated crop for diseases such as cholera, trachoma, the ORF virus, and Escherichia coli. In his book Tonino, Stoffolano became the first to produce the lineage of Grillo parlante, or the talking cricket in Carlo Collodi's most famous book, The Adventures of Pinocchio. During his 2010 sabbatical, Stoffolano and his wife Susan traveled around the world, visiting various countries and doing research in South Africa with the specialist on adipokinetic hormones in insects, Gerd Gade. As a result of this experience, he published the first paper showing the positive response the adipokinetic hormone had on crop contractions in a fly.

== Awards and honors ==
- Teacher of the year by the Entomological Society of America in 1978
- Alumni of Distinction Award from Oneonta College in 2013
- Distinguished Alumni Award from Oneonta College in 2020

== Academic publications ==
Stoffolano wrote or co-authored over 162 scholarly papers and authored or co-authored several academic books.

=== Books ===
- Dashefsky, H. S. and J. G. Stoffolano. A tutorial guide to the insect orders (adults), spiral bound, January 1, 1977. Burgess Pub. Co., Minneapolis. vi + 57 pp. illus.
- Romoser, W. and J. G. Stoffolano, Jr. pub. Year. 1997. 4 editions. The Science of Entomology. McGraw-Hill College editions.
- Stoffolano, J. G., Jr. 2011. Tonino – the adventures of a boy/cricket from Boston's North End. iUniverse, Bloomington, IN. 424 pp.
- Stoffolano, M. and J. Stoffolano. 2012. Butterflies and Fairies of Sanibel Island. in publisher: Levellers Press

=== Papers ===
- Stoffolano, J.G., Jr. and W.A.R. Nickel. 1966. Nematode parasite (Heterotylenchus sp.) of face fly in New York State. J. Econ. Entomol. 59: 221–222.
- Stoffolano, J.G., Jr. and J.G. Matthysse. 1967. Influence of photoperiod and temperature on diapause in the face fly, Musca autumnalis (Diptera: Muscidae). Ann. Entomol. Soc. Amer. 60:1242-1246.
- Chitwood, M.B. and J.G. Stoffolano, Jr. 1971. First report of Thelazia sp. (Nematoda) in the face fly, Musca autumnalis, in North America. J. Parasitology 57:1363-1364.
- Stoffolano, J.G., Jr., N.E. Woodley, A. Borkent, and L.R.S. Yin. 1988. Ultrastructural studies of the abdominal plaques of some Diptera. Ann. Entomol. Soc. Amer. 81: 502–510.
- Stoffolano J.G., Jr., Zou, B.-X. and Yin, C.-M. 1990. The stinkhorn fungus, Mutinus caninus, as a potential food for egg development in the blowfly, Phormia regina. Entomol. exp. appl. 55: 267–273.
- Yin, C.-M., B.-X. Zou, M. Jiang, M.-F. Li, W. Qin, T.L. Potter and J.G. Stoffolano, Jr. 1995. Identification of juvenile hormone III bisepoxide (JHB3), juvenile hormone III and methyl farnesoate secreted by the corpus allatum of Phormia regina (Meigen), in vitro and function of JHB3 either applied alone or as a part of a juvenoid blend. J. Insect Physiol. 41: 473–479.

== Notes ==
- Stoffolano Jr., J.G. (2004). "Reginald F. Chapman". American Entomologist: 59–60.
- Graves, Annie. "Greenhead Flies | What are Greenheads?". Yankee Magazine. New England Network. Retrieved 6 July 2017.
