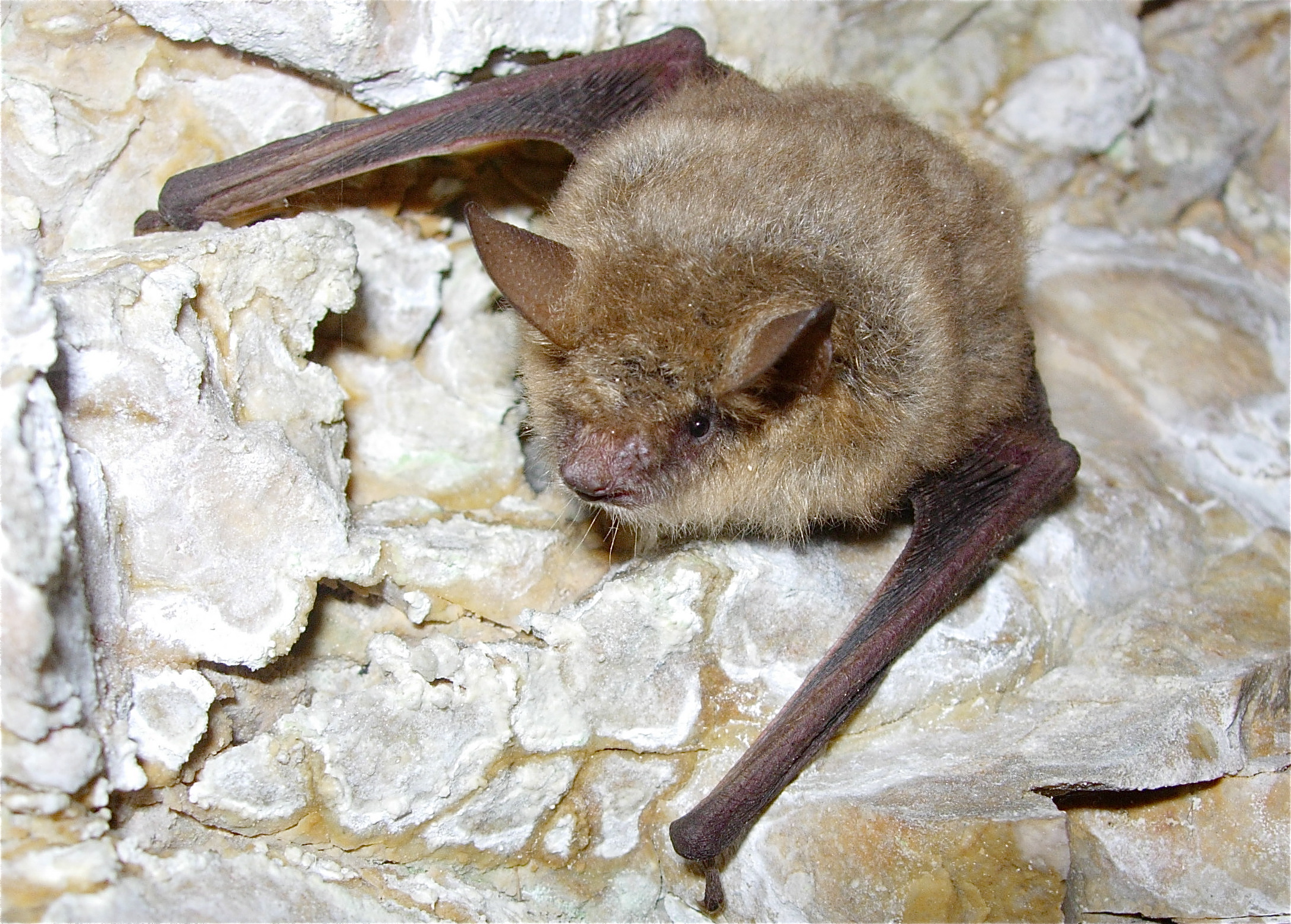

Conservation status
- Least Concern (IUCN 3.1)

Scientific classification
- Kingdom: Animalia
- Phylum: Chordata
- Class: Mammalia
- Order: Chiroptera
- Family: Vespertilionidae
- Genus: Myotis
- Species: M. emarginatus

Binomial name
- Myotis emarginatus (E. Geoffroy Saint-Hilaire, 1806)
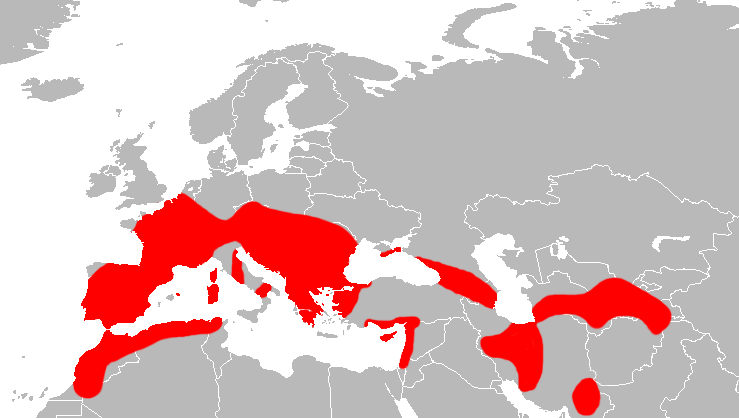

= Geoffroy's bat =

Species of bat

Geoffroy's bat (Myotis emarginatus), also known as the notch-eared bat, is a species of vesper bat.

== Description ==
M. emarginatus is a medium-sized bat with long and woolly fur. The dorsal side of the torso is rust-brown to fox-red and the ventral side is a poorly delineated pale yellowish-brown. The young animals are almost fully grey. The face is light brown. The ears are brown and they have an almost right-angled notch at the outer edge and many scattered, wart-like growths on the auricle. The tip of the tragus does not reach the notch on the edge of the ear. The wings are brown and broad. The edge of the tail membrane is supported by a straight calcar and part of it has short, straight and soft hairs.

== Ecology ==
Geoffroy's bat feeds primarily on spiders and flies. Geoffroy's bats in southern Belgium feed primarily on blood-feeding muscid flies, primarily the stable fly and the face fly, which collectively made up up to 72% of their diet in some areas. The other primary element of their diet are web-building spiders, which make up an increased portion of their prey in areas where suitable flies are absent. Most spiders consumed by Geoffroy's bats are of the family Araneidae, with a secondary presence of Theridiidae species. Other insect species make up a lower portion of their prey intake.

In Southern Basque Country, colonies of Geoffroy's bats feed on a diversity of arthropods during the beginning of the breeding season, with flies making up the largest grouping of prey. As the season progresses, populations of both spiders and flying insects peak and the bats shift to a more specialised diet with a particular emphasis on spiders. By August, the orb-web spider Araneus diadematus makes up 80% of their recorded diet. The second and third most important prey items in this area are the flies the stable fly and the housefly.

Its preferred prey are either flightless, such as spiders, or do not fly by night, such as muscid flies. As such, the species feeds primarily by gleaning prey from hard surfaces and leaves. Spiders' webs are recorded in the bats' spoor, suggesting that the bats captured them directly from their webs.

Iberian populations of Geoffroy's bat forage mainly in broad-leaved and mixed forests, and less commonly in coniferous plantations. Their preference for dense habitats is linked to their favoured prey, web-building spiders, requiring complex vertical habitats in which to build their webs. In the northwestern parts of its range, it occurs in riparian forests and grasslands. It also frequents cattle sheds, where large populations of parasitic flies occur. In the Mediterranean extent of its range, it frequents olive plantations. It typically roosts underground and in human buildings, often together with Rhinolophus species.

== Distribution ==
Geoffroy's bat can be found in Afghanistan, Albania, Algeria, Andorra, Armenia, Austria, Azerbaijan, Belgium, Bosnia and Herzegovina, Bulgaria, Croatia, Cyprus, Czech Republic, France, Georgia, Germany, Greece, Hungary, Iran, Israel, Italy, Jordan, Kazakhstan, Kyrgyzstan, Lebanon, Luxembourg, Montenegro, Morocco, Netherlands, North Macedonia, Oman, Poland, Portugal, Romania, Russian Federation, San Marino, Saudi Arabia, Serbia, Slovakia, Slovenia, Spain, Switzerland, Tajikistan, Tunisia, Turkey, Turkmenistan, Ukraine, and Uzbekistan.

In 2012 a specimen was found in southern England.

== Conservation ==
The heavy dietary dependence of northwestern populations of Geoffroy's bat on blood-feeding flies make them vulnerable to human attempts to control fly populations intended to protect livestock and human health. Its feeding areas are also impact by the introduction of more efficient ventilation and sanitation in cattle sheds, which reduce the presence of flies within them and thus reduce their ecologic value for the bats. Iberian colonies are instead dependent on complex, heterogenous forest habitats, which favour the proliferation of spider prey.
