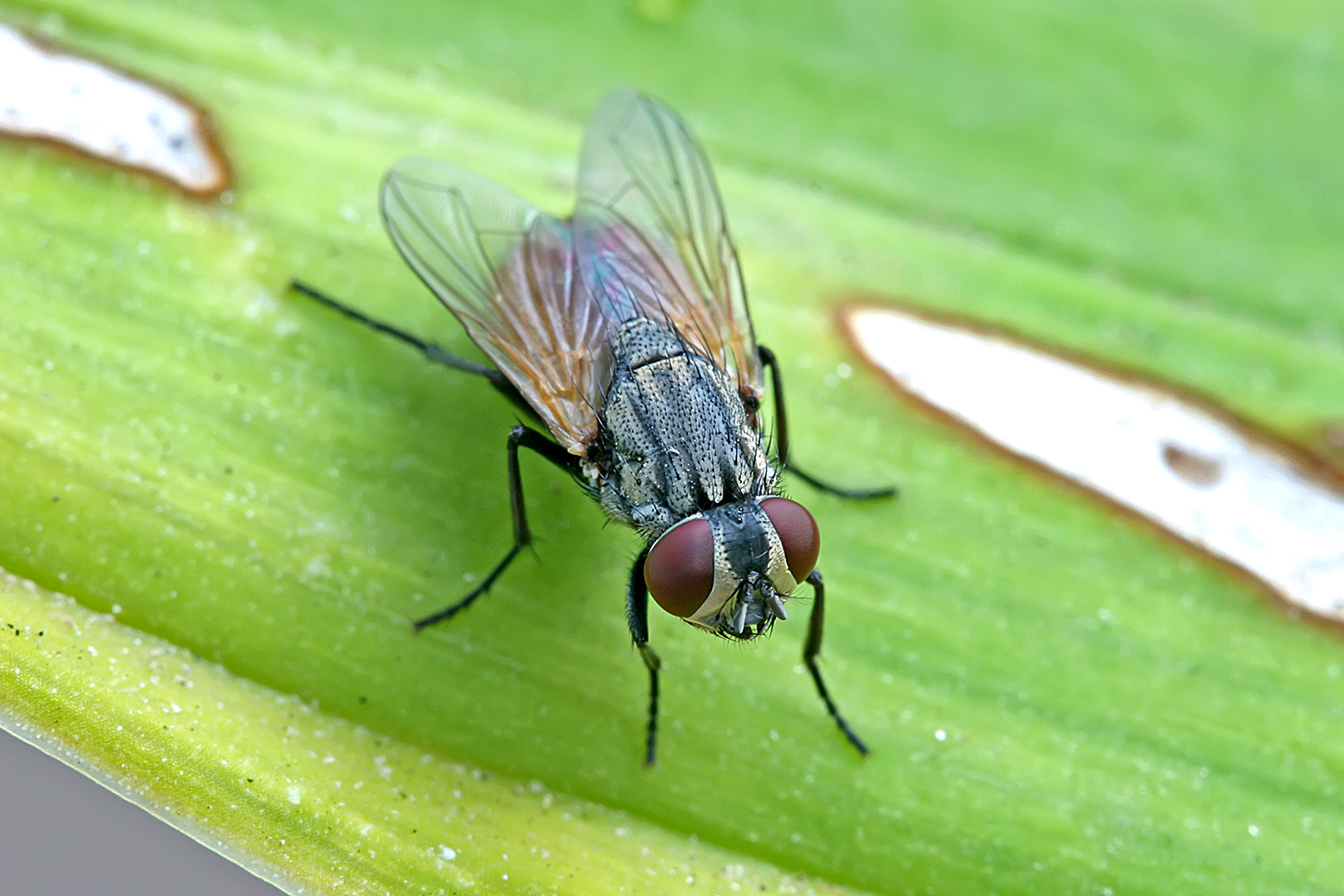

Scientific classification
- Kingdom: Animalia
- Phylum: Arthropoda
- Clade: Pancrustacea
- Class: Insecta
- Order: Diptera
- Family: Muscidae
- Genus: Musca
- Species: M. sorbens

Binomial name
- Musca sorbens Wiedemann, 1830

= Musca sorbens =

Bazaar fly

Species of fly

Musca sorbens, the bazaar fly or eye-seeking fly, is a close relative of, and very similar in appearance to, the housefly (Musca domestica) or the Australian bush fly (M. vetustissima). It is found in tropical and subtropical Africa, Asia and the Pacific Ocean region. It breeds in excreta, especially human faeces, and is the main insect vector of trachoma, a major cause of blindness.

== Distribution ==
Bazaar flies are found in parts of Africa, Asia and the Pacific Ocean region. The flies need temperatures between about 16 to 40 °C (61 to 104 °F), with 28 °C (82 °F) being optimal, and a humidity level of over 85%. Bazaar flies are more abundant at low and medium altitudes. They may be more abundant in winter, spring and autumn, or summer depending on rainfall patterns, competition for dung, and predation.

== Life cycle ==
After mating, female bazaar flies seek out suitable places to lay their eggs. Bazaar flies are most attracted to human faeces on the ground (they will not breed in covered pit latrines). If no human faeces are available, the excreta of other animals will suffice. The larvae develop in the faeces and die if the excreta dries out or becomes too hot. When developed, the larvae pupate, undergo metamorphosis and emerge as adult flies. The time from egg-laying to adult emergence averages nine days.

The bazaar fly is a prolific species: theoretically, if all its progeny survived, a single female bazaar fly kept at 28 °C (82 °F) could produce 17.8 million offspring within 11 weeks. The quality of the emerging adult flies (as measured by head breadth) is better from human faeces than from those of any other animal; these larger flies are likely to be more fecund and have longer lives, thus producing more offspring.

== Relationship with humans ==
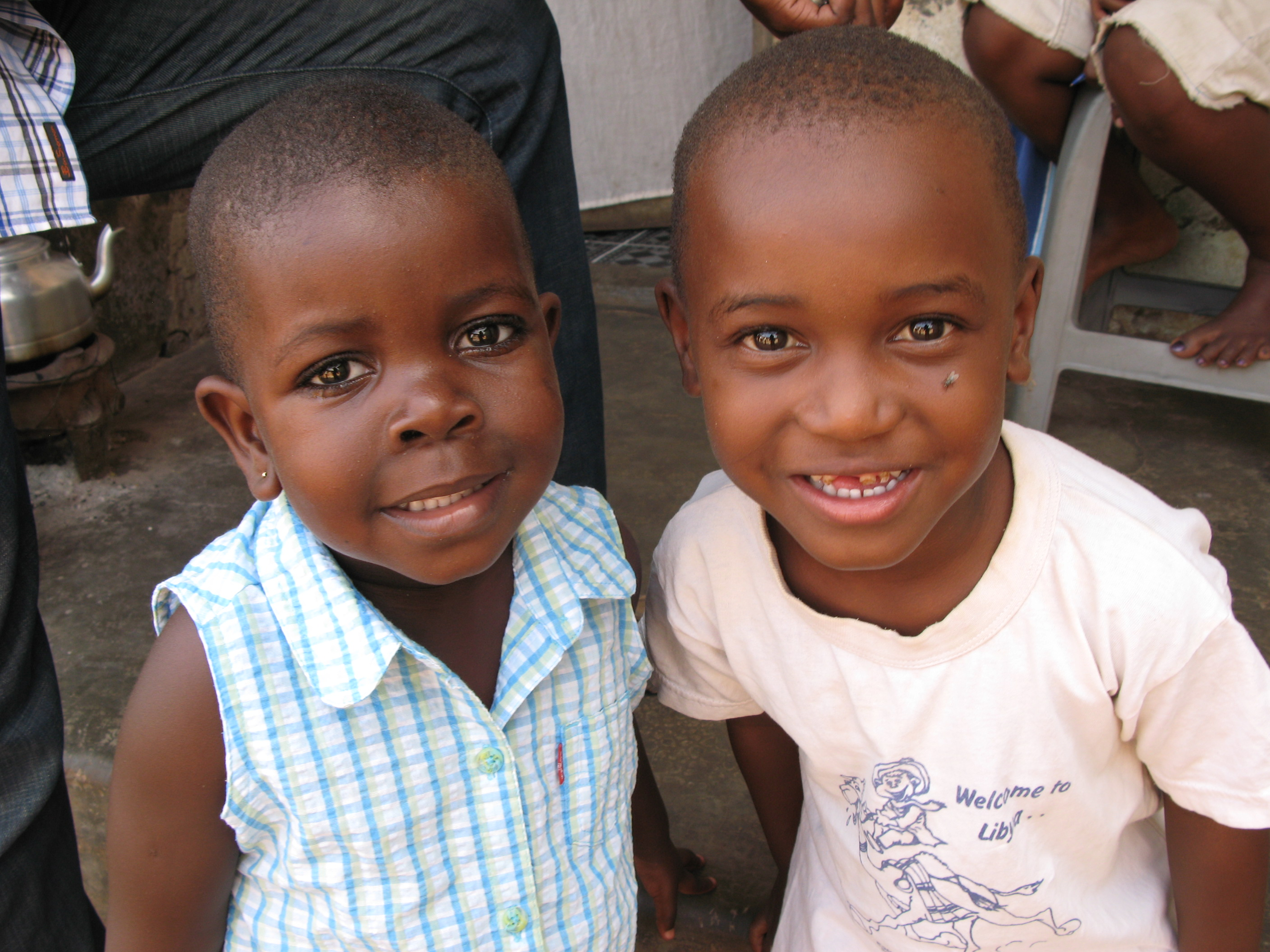
Fly on cheek: the bazaar fly is the principal insect vector of trachoma.

This fly lives close to humans; it probably coevolved with humans in Africa, spreading with them to other parts of Africa and Asia. It is not found in the Americas. Bazaar flies are a nuisance, disturbing people at leisure and at work, but they are principally disliked because of their habit of settling on people's faces (particularly around the eyes) and on sweaty skin, seeking out bodily secretions and suppurating wounds.

The bazaar fly is a vector for trachoma, a disease caused by the bacterium Chlamydia trachomatis, which can result in blindness. Research in Gambia suggests that young children are the main reservoir of the bacteria and that this fly is the principal insect vector of trachoma infection. Worldwide, trachoma results in the visual impairment of over 2 million people and the blindness of 1.2 million and is the main cause of preventable blindness.
