= Aussie salute =

Slang term for waving flies away from one's face

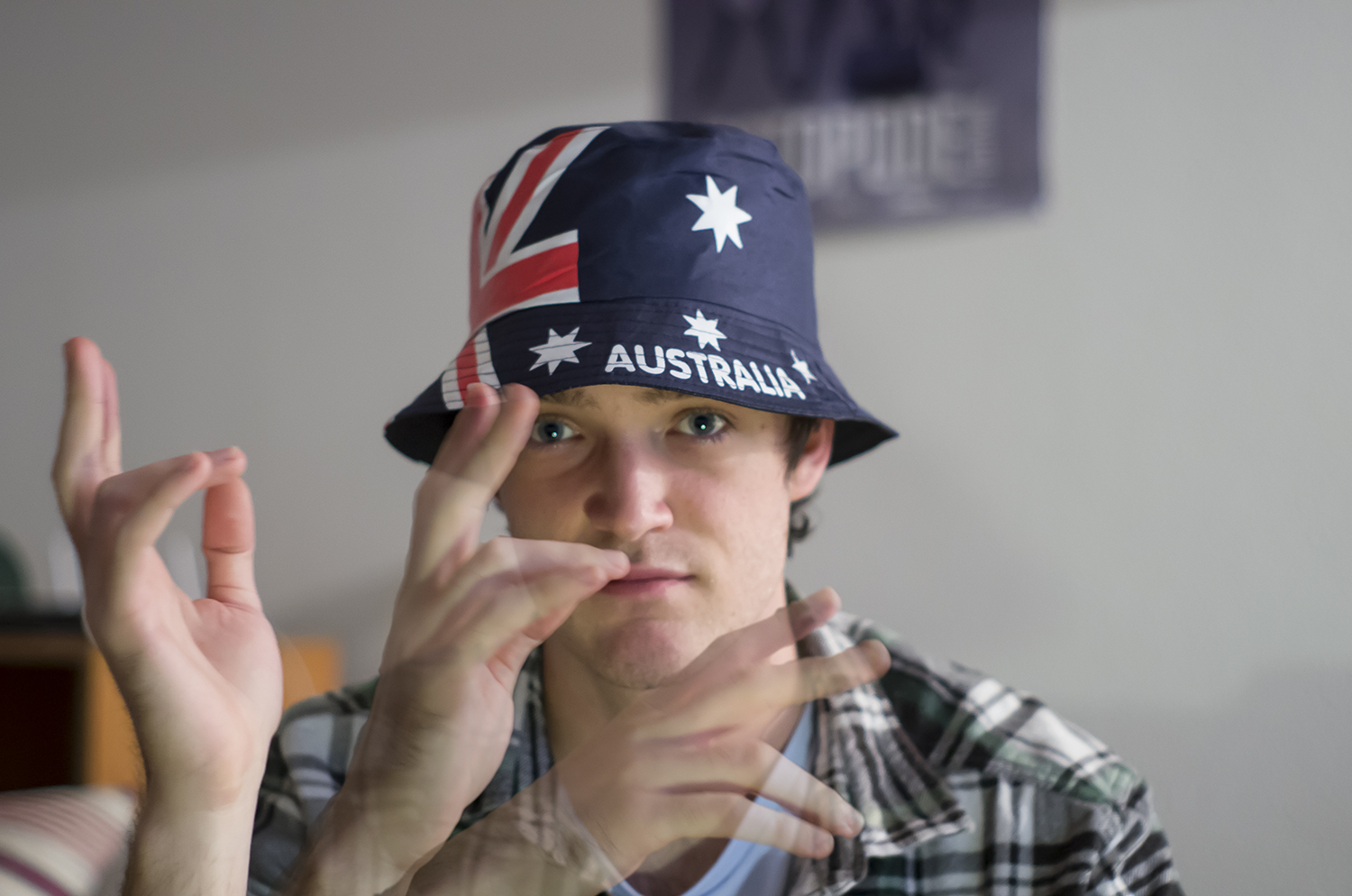
Demonstration of the hand motion of the Aussie salute

The Aussie salute, otherwise known as the Barcoo salute (named after the region around Barcoo River, Queensland), is an Australian gesture used to deter bush flies away from the human face.

The movement responds to the bush fly, which is found in the region. The Musca vetustissima is attracted to bodily fluids including saliva, tears and sweat, which results in them often hovering around human faces.

== Process ==
The Aussie Salute is a quick movement using the arm and movement from the hand to wrist, bending at the point of the elbow and straight from the wrist to the hand, the process of an Aussie Salute involves the bringing the arm to the participant's face. Movement is then seen as the hand moves, fingers running parallel to the jaw, rotating the hand on the wrist joint across the face. The gesture is often repeated.

The movement is often repeated due to the agility of the bush fly. As the fly has two pairs of wings, they are able to react to the hand gesture quickly and return to their previous position. The fly is also able to utilize their compound eyes to anticipate the incoming hand, via the ability to sense the sudden presence of shade around them.

== Origins ==
Australia has a large amount of bush flies, an animal that grows within other animals' faeces. Going by the colloquial name bush fly, the animal (Musca vetustissima) found in Australia is much more keen to place itself on the human face compared to its international counterparts. For example, the eye fly (Musca sorbens) found in Africa and Asia, lives primarily around agricultural animals.

Although cattle are now the main contemporary breeding ground the bush fly, it was in fact the emu was able to create the best breeding ground for the bush fly prior to English colonization of the land mass. While the faeces of both the human and the dog would have been adequate vessels for the bush fly, several factors point to the fact they were not the primary breeding ground for the fly. The human population was not dense enough, and the precolonial Australian dog (the dingo), had not been in the country long enough to establish themselves, having only been there for a few thousand years.

The large native Australian bird, the emu, has large wet faeces allowing for the 3–4 days' incubation needed for fly larvae. The emu faeces is also highly suited for the fly as nutrient-rich to allow for the flies rapid growth. The emu faeces is also not too highly attractive for native Australian dung beetles, getting rid of a potential competitor for space. Emu faeces was not attractive to such species as the dung beetle due to its texture being hard to work with as a result of the emu's fast digestion rate. This fast digestion rate is allowed through the emu's lack of a large intestine or a large gizzard. The emu's faeces has a non-solid and rope like texture. This texture is due to the emu's diet including fruits, invertebrates, flowers and shoots. With a highly varied diet and lack of competition for space, emu faeces are great breeding ground for the Musca vetustissima.

The other factor that allowed for the native emu to facilitate the growth of the bush fly larvae is their estimated pre-colonial population. Their previous population, before Australia was an English colony, is likely to have been higher than the population of humans.

When the weather gets hotter, the bush fly migrates south, following large crowds of people as they flock outside for the warm weather. The prevalence of the bush fly in Australia has resulted in the need for such a gesture as the Aussie salute.

== Illustrations in media ==
The gesture can be spotted across the country and across popular media. Such illustrations include:

- An online interview writer Tom Tebbutt held with Canadian tennis players at the Australian Open
- TEN Melbourne News story headlined, "The Great Aussie Salute: Victorians are not only suffering unusually hot weather but also an influx of flies"
- ABC (Australian Broadcasting Corporation) online science story written by Genelle Weule with quotations from Maggie Hardy of the University of Queensland
