= Musca afra =

Scientific classification
- Kingdom: Animalia
- Phylum: Arthropoda
- Clade: Pancrustacea
- Class: Insecta
- Order: Diptera
- Family: Muscidae
- Genus: Musca
- Species: M. afra

Binomial name
- Musca afra Paterson, 1956

Species of fly

Musca afra is a species of fly belonging to the taxonomic tribe Muscini. It is native to Tanzania.
