= Musca xanthomelas =

Scientific classification
- Kingdom: Animalia
- Phylum: Arthropoda
- Class: Insecta
- Order: Diptera
- Family: Muscidae
- Genus: Musca
- Species: M. xanthomelas

Binomial name
- Musca xanthomelas Wiedemann, 1824

Synonyms
- Musca albomaculata (Macquart, 1843); Musca dorsomaculata (Macquart, 1843); Musca frontalis (Gimmerthal, 1834); Musca irwinrossi (Zielke, 1974); Musca rufiventris (Macquart, 1843); Musca senilis (Eversmann, 1834); Musca setigera (Awati, 1916)

Species of fly

Musca xanthomelas is a species of fly belonging to the taxonomic tribe Muscini. It is widespread across Africa from the eastern to southern regions. It feeds on dung, especially from cattle and a variety of other sources such as tears from wildebeest.

Female members of this species at intervals of about 5 days can lay up to 4 batches of eggs with as many as 33 eggs per batch. A single female can produce a maximum of 94 eggs.

== Epidemiology ==
They are able to get infected from Alcelaphinae herpes virus 1 (AHV-1) from infected wildebeest. The virus however are not able to be transferred to cattle of rabbits. This lack of transmission may be due to their reluctance to feed on their tears after having a protein rich meal from the wildebeest.
