= Musca vitripennis =

Scientific classification
- Kingdom: Animalia
- Phylum: Arthropoda
- Class: Insecta
- Order: Diptera
- Family: Muscidae
- Genus: Musca
- Species: M. vitripennis

Binomial name
- Musca vitripennis Meigen, 1826

Species of fly

Musca vitripennis is a species of fly in the genus Musca. According to Willi Hennig, M. vitripennis is one of only two species of Musca native to the Palearctic realm, the other being Musca osiris. The two species are frequently confused with each other.
