= Musca aethiops =

Scientific classification
- Kingdom: Animalia
- Phylum: Arthropoda
- Class: Insecta
- Order: Diptera
- Family: Muscidae
- Tribe: Muscini
- Genus: Musca
- Species: M. aethiops

Binomial name
- Musca aethiops Stein, 1913

Species of fly

Musca aethiops is a species of fly in the tribe Muscini. It is native to South Africa.
