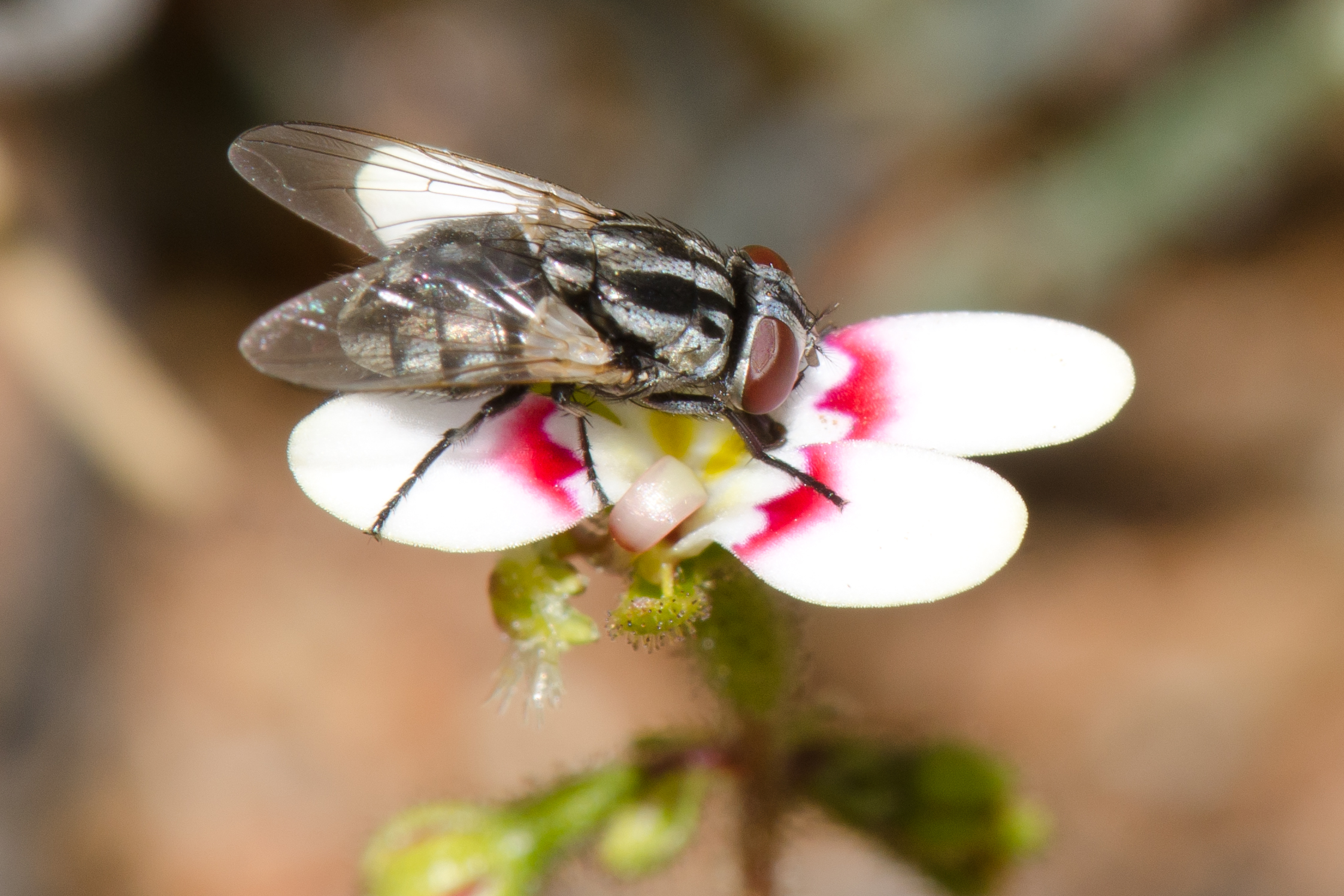
- An Australian bush fly on a flower

Scientific classification
- Kingdom: Animalia
- Phylum: Arthropoda
- Clade: Pancrustacea
- Class: Insecta
- Order: Diptera
- Family: Muscidae
- Genus: Musca
- Species: M. vetustissima

Binomial name
- Musca vetustissima Walker, 1849

= Musca vetustissima =

Australian bush fly

Species of fly

Musca vetustissima, commonly known as the Australian bush fly, is a species of fly found in Australia. It is the specific fly that has given rise to the expression "Aussie salute".

== Description ==
The Australian bush fly is a muscoid fly that is closely related to the bazaar fly (M. sorbens). The adults are attracted to large mammals for fluid for nourishment and feces for oviposition. A study showed that there is a low survival rate for eggs and larvae of this species in cattle feces because of infrequent rainfall. The study also showed that parasites and predators have caused a low survival rate. According to a study, the Australian bush fly can spread harmful bacteria. The Australian bush fly can also spread the pathogens Salmonella and Shigella. Most of the bacterial populations per fly occurred in a farm environment, while an urban environment was the lowest. A standard composition that contains small amounts of trimethylamine and indole, blended with large amounts of ammonium sulfate and anchovy meal, attracts the Australian bush fly. A wind-oriented trap has been used to catch this species. The number of ovarioles in females probably have to do with how big they are. If females do not obtain enough dietary protein, the maturation of their eggs will stop. This fly likes to crawl on human faces, as well as on the faces of livestock. It also likes to crawl on human and livestock feces, though it seems that it prefers human feces.

== Life cycle ==
The Australian bush fly breeds in large numbers in dung pads. Larvae have been found in the feces of large mammals. The species continually breeds in subtropical Australia, and migrations help repopulate Australia each spring. In a study, a mixture of levamisole and oxfendazole killed larvae in sheep feces.

== See also ==
- Dung beetle
