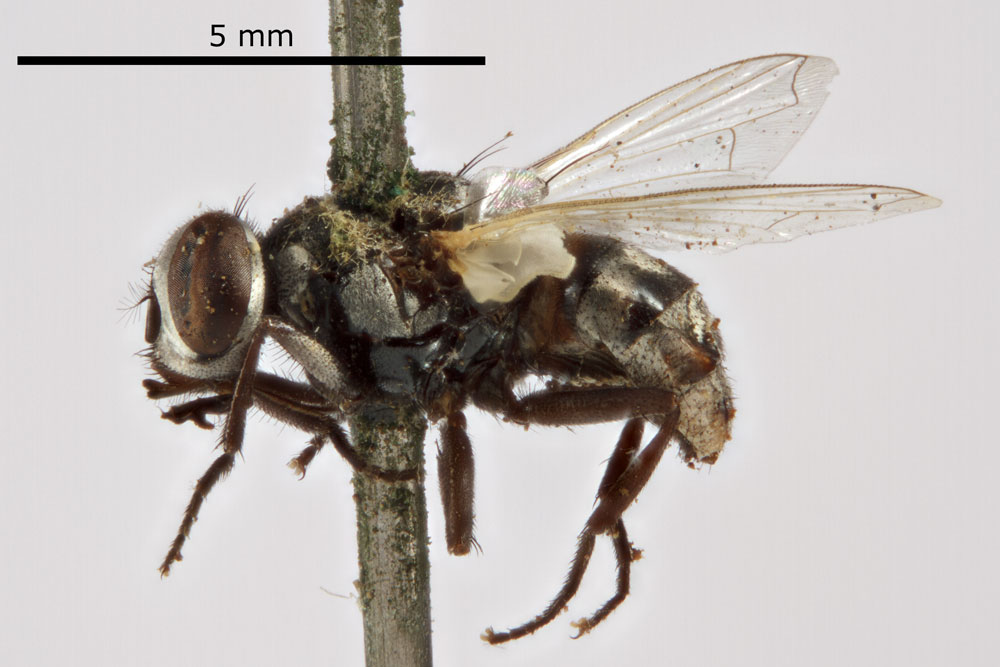

Scientific classification
- Kingdom: Animalia
- Phylum: Arthropoda
- Class: Insecta
- Order: Diptera
- Family: Muscidae
- Genus: Musca
- Species: M. albina

Binomial name
- Musca albina Wiedemann, 1830

= Musca albina =

Species of fly

Musca albina is a widespread Old World species of fly, known from the dry areas of the Afrotropical realm, North Africa and the Middle East, Central Asia, India and Sri Lanka. It is a sun-loving species, and adults have been found clustering around domestic animals to feed on sweat and other secretions and on their feces. The Namibian population at least is clearly kleptoparasitic and very specific in its oviposition behaviour, laying eggs only in dung balls being interred by one out of several co-occurring dung-rolling scarab beetle species.
