= Phortica variegata =

- Phortica variegata frequenting a human eye in Italy

Scientific classification
- Kingdom: Animalia
- Phylum: Arthropoda
- Class: Insecta
- Order: Diptera
- Family: Drosophilidae
- Genus: Phortica
- Species: P. variegata

Binomial name
- Phortica variegata (Fallen, 1823)

Species of fly

Phortica variegata (also known as the "variegated fruit fly") is a species of vinegar fly in the family Drosophilidae. Phortica and related fly species are perhaps best known for their behaviour of feeding on the lacrimal secretions (lachryphagy) of mammals. As a consequence of this behaviour, P. variegata can serve as a vector of Thelazia callipaeda roundworms.

The species was first described as Amiota variegata (Fallén, 1823), but has since been clarified as a member of the Phortica genus.
