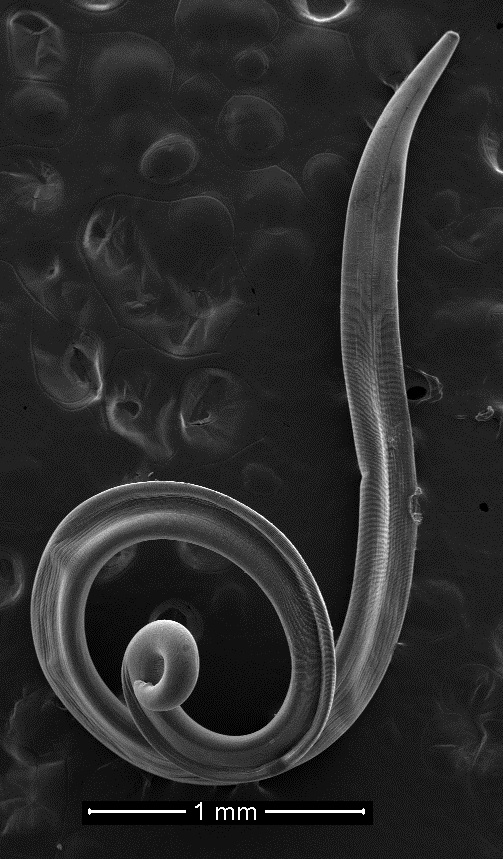
- Male

Scientific classification
- Kingdom: Animalia
- Phylum: Nematoda
- Class: Chromadorea
- Order: Rhabditida
- Suborder: Spirurina
- Infraorder: Spiruromorpha
- Superfamily: Thelazioidea
- Family: Thelaziidae
- Genus: Thelazia
- Species: T. callipaeda

Binomial name
- Thelazia callipaeda Railliet and Henry, 1910

= Thelazia callipaeda =

Species of worm

Thelazia callipaeda is a parasitic nematode, and the most common cause of thelaziasis (or eyeworm infestation) in humans, dogs and cats. It was first discovered in the eyes of a dog in China in 1910. By 2000, over 250 human cases had been reported in the medical literature.

== Morphology ==
The adult Thelazia callipaeda worm typically measures 5 to 20 mm in length and 250 to 800 μm in diameter. The males tend to be smaller than the females in size. In distinguishing this species from other worms, they have a distinct buccal capsule and a cuticle with spaced transverse striations giving it a ridged appearance. Adult females could also be identified by the position of their vulva which is anterior to the oesophagus-intestinal junction. The males can be distinguished by their possession of five pairs of postcloacal papillae.

== Hosts ==
In addition to humans, cats and dogs, definitive hosts of T. callipaeda include the wolf (Canis lupus), raccoon dog (Nyctereutes procyonoides), red fox (Vulpes fulva), and European rabbit (Oryctolagus cuniculus).

Once restricted to East and Southeast Asia, Thelazia callipaeda is now established across Europe, with increasing reports in many countries, including Austria, Croatia, France, Germany, Greece, Italy, Moldova, Portugal, Romania, Slovakia, Spain, and Switzerland. Sporadic cases have recently (2021) appeared in the United States.

Two intermediate hosts have been identified so far: Phortica variegata (Diptera: Drosophilidae) in Europe and Phortica okadai in China, which feed on tears of humans and carnivores. Some data suggests that only the males of A. (P.) variegata carry Thelazia callipaeda larvae, making Thelazia the only parasite species known to be spread exclusively by a male vector.

== Life cycle ==
The eggs of Thelazia callipaeda develop into first stage larvae (L1), in utero while the female is in the tissues in and around the eye of the definitive host. The female deposits these larvae, which are still enclosed in the egg membranes, in the tears (lacrymal secretions) of the host. When a tear-feeding fly (intermediate host) feeds, it ingests the T. callipaeda larvae. Once inside the fly, the L1 larvae "hatch" from the egg membrane and penetrate the gut wall. They remain in the hemocoel (the fly's circulatory system) for 2 days, and then invade either the fat body or testes of the flies. In these tissues, the larvae develop into third stage larvae (L3). The L3 migrates to the head of the fly, and is released in or near the eye of a new host mammal when the fly feeds again. Once in the eye, eyelid, tear glands, or tear ducts of the mammalian host, the L3 larvae develop through the L4 larval stage and into adults in about 1 month. The seasonal timing of L1 and L4 larvae in the lacrymal (tear) secretions of naturally infested dogs in Italy was found to coincide with the activity of the fly vectors.

== Symptoms, diagnosis and treatment ==
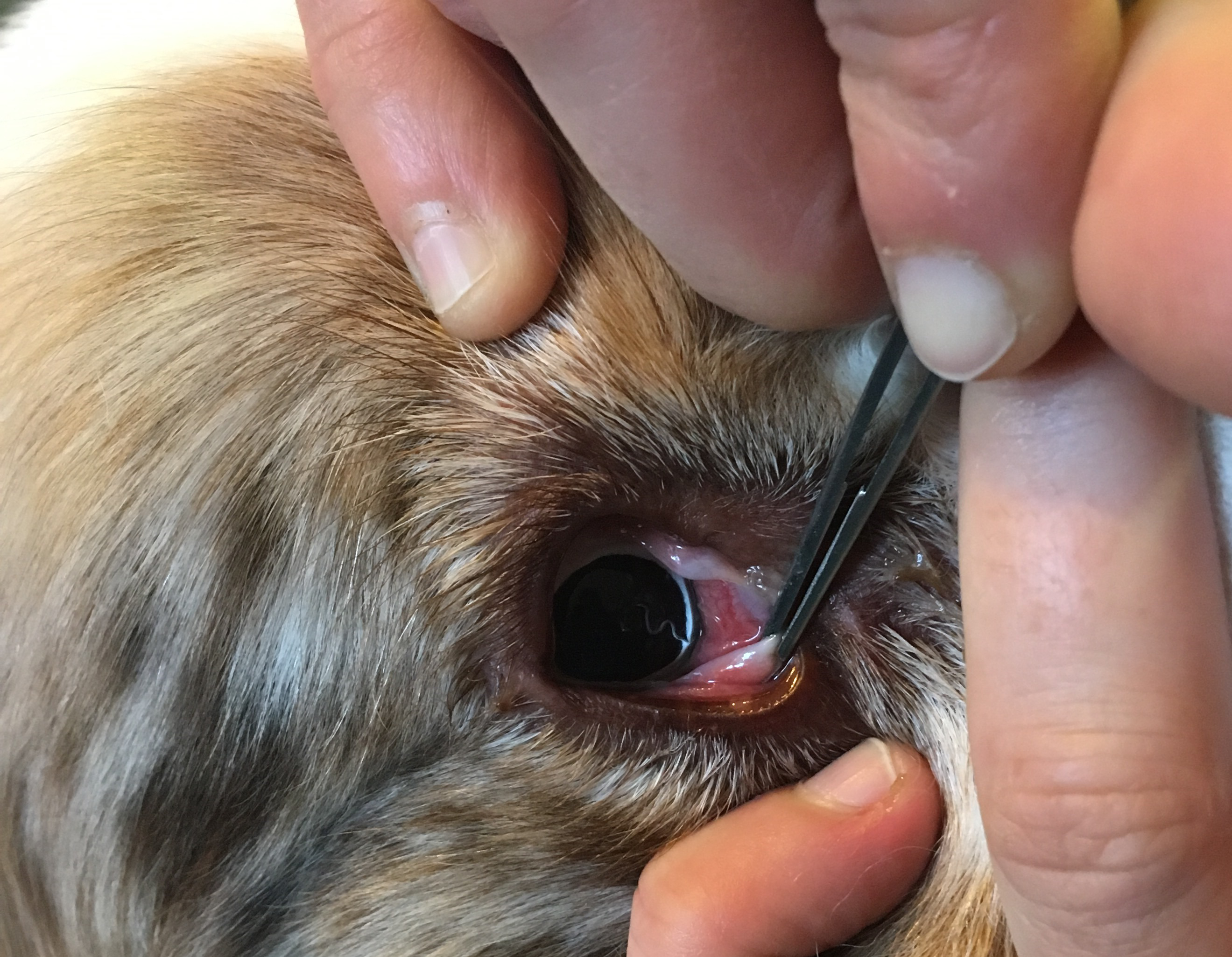
Thelazia callipaeda in the eye of a dog

Symptoms of T. callipaeda infestation include conjunctivitis, excessive watering (lacrimation), visual impairment, and ulcers or scarring of the cornea. In some cases, the only symptom is the worm obscuring the host's vision as a "floater".

Diagnosis is made by finding the adult worms in the eye or surrounding tissues. Human cases are treated by simply removing the worms. In canines, topical imidacloprid with moxidectin, or milbemycin oxime (Interceptor) have been recommended.

In canines, prevention against canine thelaziosis by monthly administrations of a combination of milbemycin oxime and afoxolaner has been found effective.
