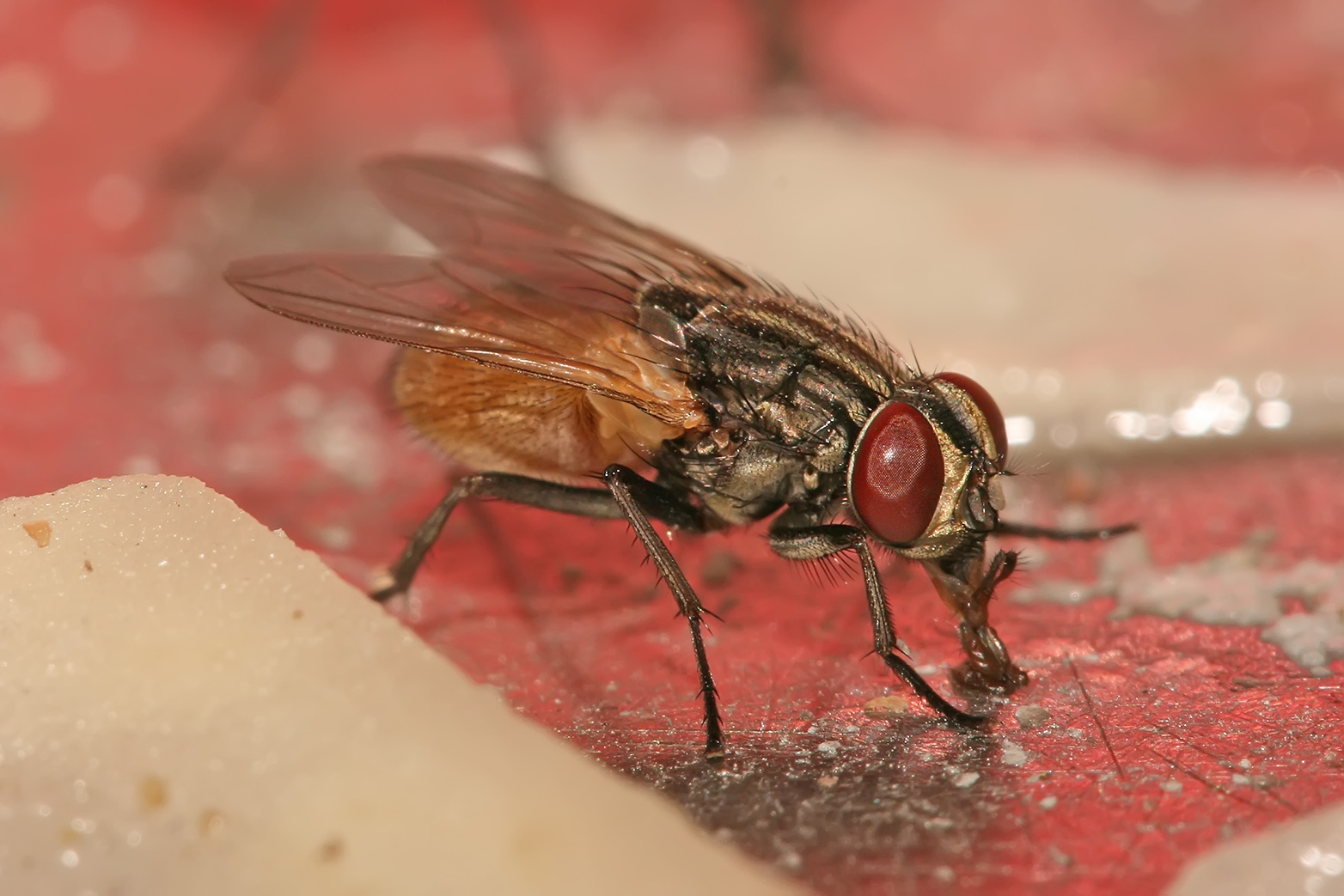
- Musca domestica (housefly)

Scientific classification
- Kingdom: Animalia
- Phylum: Arthropoda
- Clade: Pancrustacea
- Class: Insecta
- Order: Diptera
- Family: Muscidae
- Subfamily: Muscinae
- Tribe: Muscini
- Genus: Musca; Linnaeus, 1758

Type species
- M. domestica Linnaeus, 1758

Species
- See text

Synonyms
- Byomya Robineau-Desvoidy, 1830; Eumusca Townsend, 1911; Plaxemya Robineau-Desvoidy, 1830

= Musca (fly) =

Genus of flies

Musca is a genus of flies. It includes Musca domestica (the housefly), as well as Musca autumnalis (the face fly or autumn housefly). It is part of the family Muscidae.

== Selected species ==
- M. aethiops Stein, 1913, Tanzania
- M. afra Paterson, 1956, Tanzania
- M. albina Wiedemann, 1830
- M. alpesa Walker, 1849
- M. amita Hennig, 1964
- M. asiatica Shinonaga & Kano, 1977
- M. autumnalis De Geer, 1776
- M. bakeri Patton, 1923
- M. bezzii Patton & Cragg, 1913
- M. biseta Hough, 1898
- M. capensis Zielke, 1971
- M. cassara Pont, 1973
- M conducens Walker, 1859
- M. confiscata Speiser, 1924
- M convexifrons Thomson, 1869
- M. craggi Patton, 1922
- M. crassirostris Stein, 1903
- M. curviforceps Saccà & Rivosechi, 1956
- M. dasyops Stein, 1913
- M. domestica Linnaeus, 1758
- M. elatior Villeneuve, 1937
- M. emdeni Nandi & Sinha, 2004
- M. ethiopica Zielke, 1973
- M. fergusoni Johnston & Bancroft, 1920
- M. fletcheri Patton & Senior-White, 1924
- M. formosana Malloch, 1925
- M. freedmani Paterson, 1957
- M. gabonensis Macquart, 1855
- M. heidiae Zielke, 1974
- M. hervei Villeneuve, 1922
- M. hugonis Pont, 1980
- M. illingworthi Patton, 1923
- M. inferior Stein, 1909
- M. larvipara Porchinskiy, 1910
- M. lasiopa Villeneuve, 1936
- M. lasiophthalma Thomson, 1869
- M. liberia Snyder, 1951
- M. lindneri Paterson, 1956
- M. lothari Zielke, 1974
- M. lucidula (Loew, 1856)
- M. lusoria Wiedemann, 1824
- M. malaisei Emden, 1965
- M. mallochi Thompson & Pont, 1994
- M. meruensis Zielke, 1973
- M. munroi Patton, 1936
- M. nevilli Kleynhans, 1987
- M. osiris Wiedemann, 1830
- M. patersoni Zielke, 1971
- M. pattoni Austen, 1910
- M. pilifacies Emden, 1965
- M. planiceps Wiedemann, 1824
- M. pseudocorvina Emden, 1939
- M. santoshi Joseph & Parui, 1972
- M. seniorwhitei Patton, 1922
- M. setulosa Zielke, 1971
- M. sorbens Wiedemann, 1830
- M. spangleri Zielke, 1971
- M. splendens Pont, 1980
- M. striatacta Awati, 1916
- M. tempestatum (Bezzi, 1908)
- M. tempestiva Fallén, 1817
- M. terraereginae Johnston & Bancroft, 1920
- M. tibetana Fan, 1978
- M. transvaalensis Zielke, 1971
- M. ugandae Emden, 1939
- M. ventrosa Wiedemann, 1830
- M. vetustissima Walker, 1849
- M villeneuvii Patton, 1922
- M. vitripennis Meigen, 1826
- M. wittweri Zielke, 1974
- M. xanthomelas (Wiedemann, 1824)

== Phylogeny ==
- Nematocera
  - Other Nematocera (crane flies, mosquitoes, etc.)
  - - Brachycera
      - Tabanomorpha (horse flies, etc.)
      - Muscomorpha
        - Other Muscomorpha (robber flies, etc.)
        - - Syrphoidea (hoverflies)
          - Schizophora
            - Acalyptratae (marsh flies, etc.)
            - Calyptratae
              - Hippoboscoidea (louse flies, bat flies, etc.)
              - - Oestroidea (blow flies, flesh flies, etc.)
                - Muscoidea
                  - Fanniidae, Scathophagidae, Anthomyiidae
                  - Muscidae
                    - Azeliinae and allies
                    - Muscinae
                      - Stomoxyini
                      - - Polietina
                        - - Morellia
                          - Musca

Cladogram showing higher level classification and position of Musca within the family Muscidae.
