= Musca osiris =

Scientific classification
- Kingdom: Animalia
- Phylum: Arthropoda
- Class: Insecta
- Order: Diptera
- Family: Muscidae
- Genus: Musca
- Species: M. osiris

Binomial name
- Musca osiris Weidemann, 1830

Synonyms
- Musca fulvithorax authors

Species of fly

Musca osiris is a species of fly in the genus Musca. It and Musca vitripennis are the only two species of Musca native to the Palearctic realm, according to Willi Hennig.
