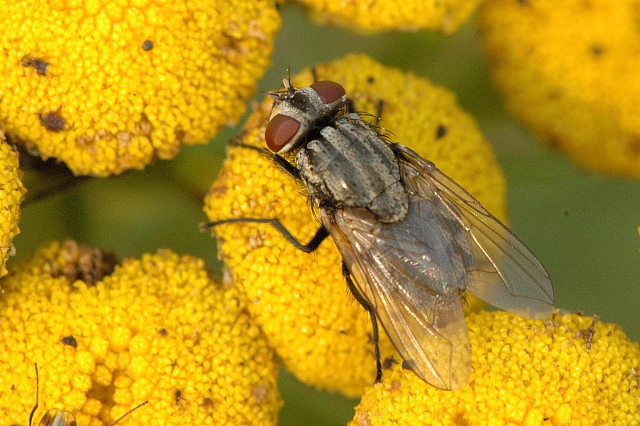

Scientific classification
- Kingdom: Animalia
- Phylum: Arthropoda
- Class: Insecta
- Order: Diptera
- Family: Muscidae
- Genus: Musca
- Species: M. autumnalis

Binomial name
- Musca autumnalis De Geer, 1776

Synonyms
- Musca corvina Fabricius, 1781; Musca restitituo Harris, 1780; Musca restituo Harris, 1776

= Musca autumnalis =

Species of fly

Musca autumnalis on Apiaceae flowers

Musca autumnalis, the face fly or autumn housefly, is a pest of cattle and horses.

== Description ==
The face fly is similar to the closely related housefly but is slightly larger, averaging about 7–8 mm long and grey in colour with four dark stripes on the thorax, with a grey-black patterned abdomen. Like many true flies, in the males, the eyes almost touch when viewed from above.

== Distribution ==
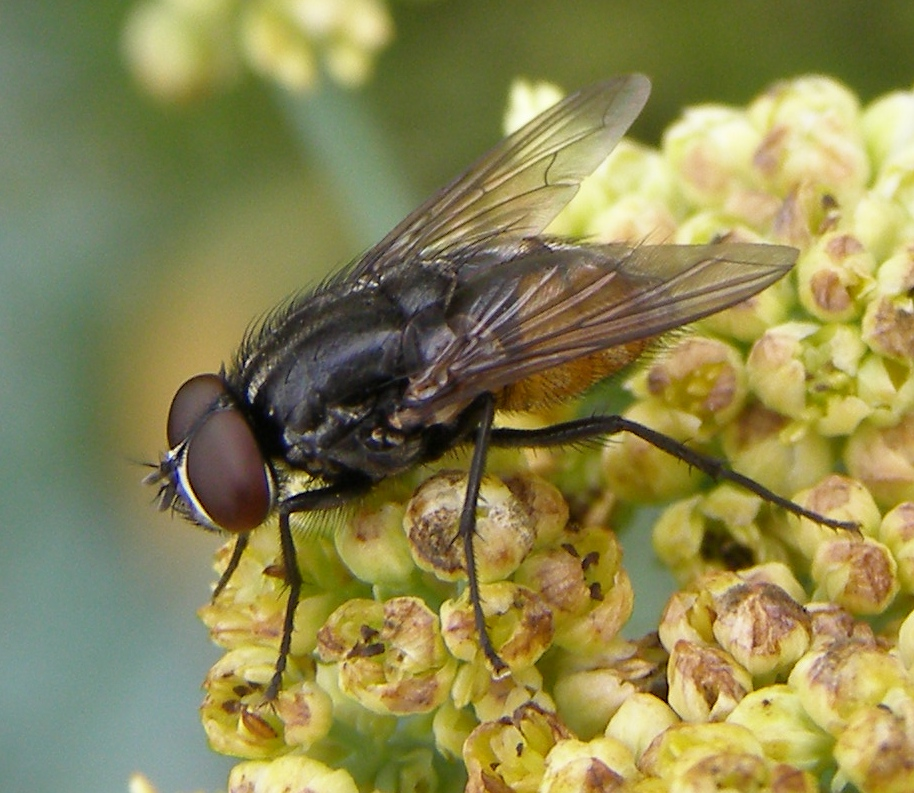
Male Musca autumnalis

Musca autumnalis is widespread throughout most of Europe, Central Asia, northern India, Pakistan, China and some parts of North Africa.

It was introduced into North America around the 1940s and has now occupies a territory from southern Canada into most temperate parts of the United States. It was also introduced to St. Helena Island in the South Atlantic.

== Lifecycle ==
Adult face flies will emerge from winter hibernation around March to early April. During the daytime, they feed on manure juices and plant sugars. On cattle and horses, they feed on secretions around the eyes, mouth and nostrils. The adult flies will also feed on the hosts' blood through wounds such as horse-fly bites. A larger proportion of face flies on the host will be females, as they have a higher need for protein provided by animal hosts. At night, both sexes will rest on vegetation.

Females deposit eggs on fresh cow manure and these hatch within hours after deposition. The yellowish-white maggots feed on the microbial flora and fauna of the manure and pass through three larval stages (instars), growing to about 12 mm long, then developing into white pupae. They emerge as adults about 10 to 20 days after egg deposition, depending on the temperature.

== As a vector of disease ==
M. autumnalis is considered a pest species, as it transmits the eyeworm Thelazia rhodesi to cattle and horses, and pinkeye (infectious bovine keratoconjunctivitis) to cattle.

As for human disease, M. autumnalis may have transmitted the eyeworm Thelazia gulosa to a woman's eye in Oregon in 2016 and to a second woman's eye in Carmel Valley, California in 2018.
