= List of Lispe species =

This is a list of 171 species in Lispe, a genus of house flies, etc. in the family Muscidae.

== Lispe species ==
- Lispe albicorpus Shinonaga & Kano, 1989
- Lispe albifacies Malloch, 1929
- Lispe albimacula (Malloch, 1923)
- Lispe albimaculata Stein, 1910
- Lispe albitarsis (Stein, 1898)
- Lispe albitarsus Stein, 1901
- Lispe alpinicola Zhong, Wu & Fan, 1981
- Lispe ambigua Stein, 1913
- Lispe andrewi Paterson, 1953
- Lispe angustipalpis (Stein, 1920)
- Lispe antennata (Aldrich, 1913)
- Lispe apicalis Mik, 1869
- Lispe appendibacula Xue & Zhang, 2005
- Lispe approximata Huckett, 1966
- Lispe aquamarina Shinonaga & Kano, 1983
- Lispe argentea Snyder, 1954
- Lispe argenteiceps Ma & Mou, 1992
- Lispe argenteifacies Grimshaw, 1901
- Lispe armata Malloch, 1925
- Lispe armeniaca Canzoneri & Meneghini, 1972
- Lispe assimilis Wiedemann, 1824
- Lispe atrifrontata (Malloch, 1922)
- Lispe aurocochlearia Séguy, 1950
- Lispe bahama Snyder, 1958
- Lispe barbipes Stein, 1908
- Lispe bengalensis (Robineau-Desvoidy, 1830)
- Lispe bimaculata Walker, 1859
- Lispe binotata (Becker, 1914)
- Lispe bipunctata Séguy, 1938
- Lispe biseta Stein, 1913
- Lispe bivittata Stein, 1909
- Lispe boninensis Snyder, 1965
- Lispe brevipes (Aldrich, 1913)
- Lispe brunnicosa (Becker, 1904)
- Lispe caesia Meigen, 1826
- Lispe cana (Walker, 1849)
- Lispe canadensis Snyder, 1954
- Lispe cancellata Canzoneri & Meneghini, 1966
- Lispe candicans Kowarz, 1892
- Lispe capensis Zielke, 1971
- Lispe chui Shinonaga & Kano, 1989
- Lispe cilitarsis Loew, 1856
- Lispe cinifera (Becker, 1904)
- Lispe consanguinea Loew, 1858
- Lispe cotidiana Snyder, 1954
- Lispe cyrtoneurina Stein, 1900
- Lispe desertorum Huckett, 1966
- Lispe desjardinsii Macquart, 1851
- Lispe dichaeta Stein, 1913
- Lispe eidsvoldica Malloch, 1925
- Lispe elegantissima (Stackelberg, 1937)
- Lispe elkantarae (Becker, 1907)
- Lispe erratica (Malloch, 1932)
- Lispe ezensis Shinonaga & Kano, 1983
- Lispe flavicincta Loew, 1847
- Lispe flavicornis (Stein, 1909)
- Lispe flavinervis (Becker, 1904)
- Lispe flavipes Stein, 1913
- Lispe frigida Erichson, 1851
- Lispe frontalis Zielke, 1972
- Lispe fuscipalpis Malloch, 1929
- Lispe fuscipes (Ringdahl, 1930)
- Lispe geniseta Stein, 1909
- Lispe glabra Wiedemann, 1824
- Lispe halophora (Becker, 1903)
- Lispe hamanae Hori & Kurahashi, 1966
- Lispe hebeiensis Ma & Tian, 1993
- Lispe hirsutipes Mou, 1992
- Lispe hispida Walker, 1849
- Lispe hydromyzina (Fallén, 1825)
- Lispe incerta (Malloch, 1925)
- Lispe irvingi Curran, 1937
- Lispe isolata Malloch, 1929
- Lispe jamesi Snyder, 1954
- Lispe johnsoni (Aldrich, 1913)
- Lispe keiseri Zielke, 1972
- Lispe kowarzi Becker, 1903
- Lispe lanceoseta Wang & Fan, 1981
- Lispe lanzarotensis Baez, 1978
- Lispe latana Snyder, 1949
- Lispe leucocephala Loew, 1856
- Lispe leucospila (Wiedemann, 1830)
- Lispe leucosticta Stein, 1918
- Lispe levis Stein, 1911
- Lispe lisarba Snyder, 1949
- Lispe litorea (Fallén, 1825)
- Lispe loewi Ringdahl, 1922
- Lispe longicollis Meigen, 1826
- Lispe lowei (Ringdahl, 1922)
- Lispe maculata Stein, 1913
- Lispe madagascariensis Zielke, 1972
- Lispe manicata Wiedemann, 1830
- Lispe mapaoensis Paterson, 1953
- Lispe marina (Becker, 1913)
- Lispe maroccana Canzoneri & Meneghini, 1966
- Lispe martirei Vikhrev, 2014
- Lispe melaleuca Loew, 1847
- Lispe metatarsalis Thomson, 1869
- Lispe metatarsata Stein, 1900
- Lispe microchaeta (Séguy, 1940)
- Lispe microptera Séguy, 1937
- Lispe miochaeta Speiser, 1910
- Lispe mirabilis (Stein, 1918)
- Lispe modesta Stein, 1913
- Lispe monochaita Mou & Ma, 1992
- Lispe nana Macquart, 1835
- Lispe nasoni (Stein, 1898)
- Lispe neimongola Tian & Ma, 2000
- Lispe neo Malloch, 1922
- Lispe neouliginosa Snyder, 1954
- Lispe nigrimana (Malloch, 1923)
- Lispe nivalis Wiedemann, 1830
- Lispe niveimaculata Stein, 1906
- Lispe nuba Wiedemann, 1830
- Lispe nubilipennis Loew, 1873
- Lispe nudifacies Snyder, 1954
- Lispe orientalis Wiedemann, 1824
- Lispe pacifica Shinonaga & Pont, 1992
- Lispe palawanensis Shinonaga & Kano, 1989
- Lispe palposa (Walker, 1849)
- Lispe paraneo Zielke, 1972
- Lispe paraspila Zielke, 1972
- Lispe patellata (Aldrich, 1913)
- Lispe patellitarsis (Becker, 1914)
- Lispe pectinipes Becker, 1903
- Lispe pennitarsis Stein, 1918
- Lispe persica (Becker, 1904)
- Lispe polita (Coquillett, 1904)
- Lispe ponti Hardy, 1981
- Lispe probohemica (Speiser, 1914)
- Lispe pumila (Wiedemann, 1824)
- Lispe pygmaea (Fallén, 1825)
- Lispe quaerens (Villeneuve, 1936)
- Lispe rigida (Becker, 1903)
- Lispe rufitibialis Macquart, 1843
- Lispe salina (Aldrich, 1913)
- Lispe scalaris Loew, 1847
- Lispe septentrionalis Xue & Zhang, 2005
- Lispe sericipalpis (Stein, 1904)
- Lispe serotina Wulp, 1896
- Lispe setuligera Stein, 1911
- Lispe sexnotata Macquart, 1843
- Lispe siamensis Shinonaga & Kano, 1989
- Lispe silvai Paterson, 1953
- Lispe simonyii (Becker, 1910)
- Lispe sineseta Zielke, 1971
- Lispe sinica Hennig, 1960
- Lispe sociabilis Loew, 1862
- Lispe songensis Zielke, 1970
- Lispe sordida (Aldrich, 1913)
- Lispe stuckenbergi Zielke, 1970
- Lispe subbivittata Mou, 1992
- Lispe superciliosa Loew, 1861
- Lispe surda Curran, 1937
- Lispe sydneyensis Schiner, 1868
- Lispe tarsocilica Xue & Zhang, 2005
- Lispe tentaculata (De Geer, 1776)
- Lispe terastigma Schiner, 1868
- Lispe tienmuensis Fan, 1974
- Lispe tuberculitarsis Stein, 1913
- Lispe uliginosa (Fallén, 1825)
- Lispe unicolor (Brullé, 1833)
- Lispe uniseta Malloch, 1922
- Lispe vilis Stein, 1911
- Lispe vittipennis Thomson, 1869
- Lispe weschei Malloch, 1922
- Lispe wittei Paterson, 1956
- Lispe xanthophleba Stein, 1950
- Lispe xenochaeta Malloch, 1923
- Lispe zumpti Paterson, 1953
