= Lispoides aequifrons =

Scientific classification
- Domain: Eukaryota
- Kingdom: Animalia
- Phylum: Arthropoda
- Class: Insecta
- Order: Diptera
- Family: Muscidae
- Tribe: Limnophorini
- Genus: Lispoides
- Species: L. aequifrons

Binomial name
- Lispoides aequifrons (Stein, 1898)

Synonyms
- Limnophora aequifrons Stein, 1898

Species of fly

Lispoides aequifrons is a species of house flies, etc. in the family Muscidae.
