= Lispe nasoni =

Scientific classification
- Domain: Eukaryota
- Kingdom: Animalia
- Phylum: Arthropoda
- Class: Insecta
- Order: Diptera
- Family: Muscidae
- Tribe: Limnophorini
- Genus: Lispe
- Species: L. nasoni

Binomial name
- Lispe nasoni (Stein, 1898)

Synonyms
- Lispa nasoni Stein, 1898

Species of fly

Lispe nasoni is a species of house flies, etc. in the family Muscidae.
