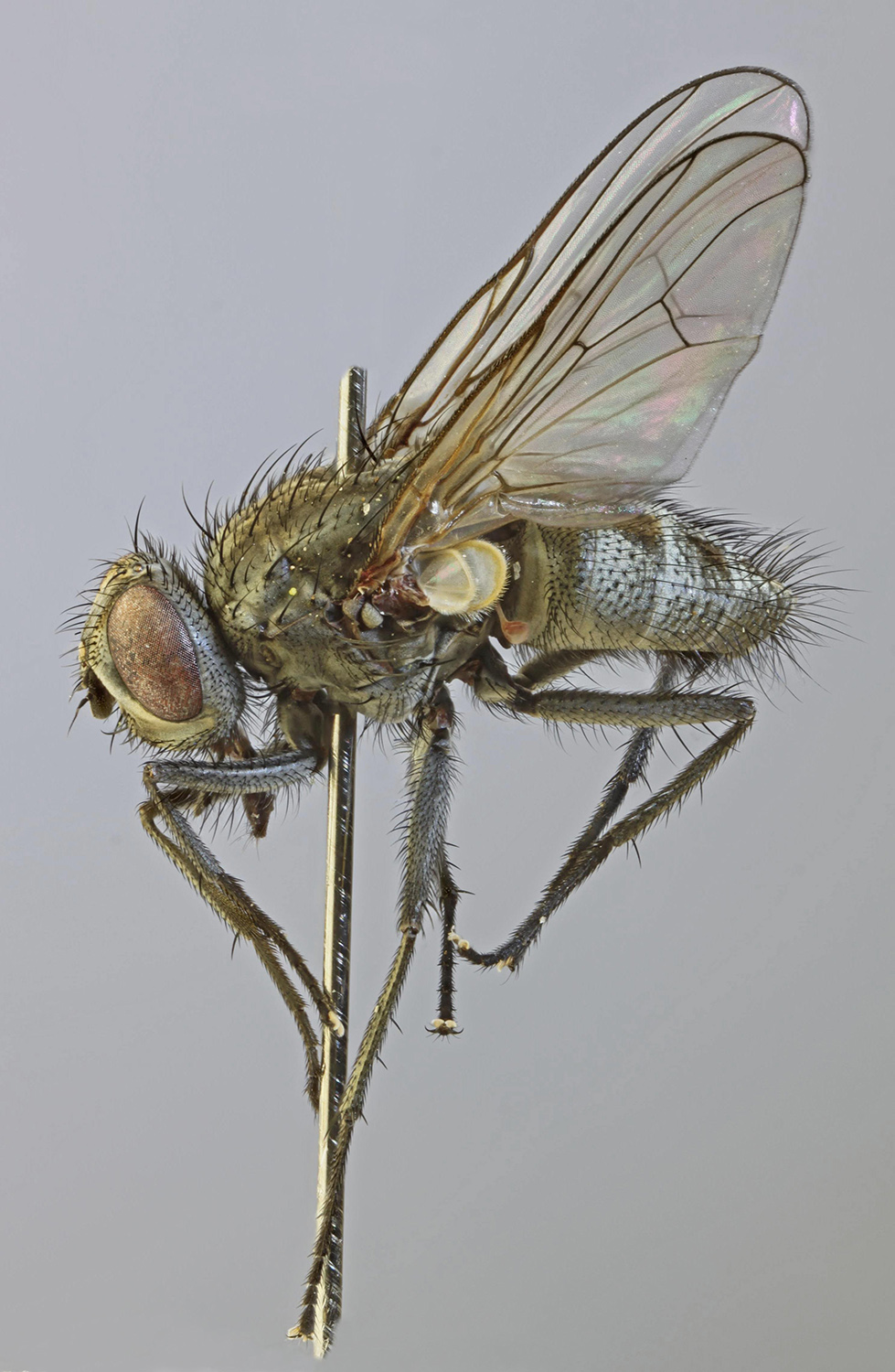
- Villeneuvia aestuum, Harlech, North Wales

Scientific classification
- Kingdom: Animalia
- Phylum: Arthropoda
- Class: Insecta
- Order: Diptera
- Family: Muscidae
- Tribe: Limnophorini
- Genus: Villeneuvia; Schnabl & Dziedzicki, 1911

Type species
- Limnophora aestuum Villeneuve, 1902

= Villeneuvia =

Genus of flies

Villeneuvia is a genus of true flies, belonging to the family Muscidae. There is only one known species. They are very similar to Limnophora, but orbital seta are absent in both sexes.

It is a coastal fly found throughout most of coastal Europe.

== Species ==
- Villeneuvia aestuum (Villeneuve, 1902)
