= Lispe sociabilis =

Scientific classification
- Kingdom: Animalia
- Phylum: Arthropoda
- Class: Insecta
- Order: Diptera
- Family: Muscidae
- Subfamily: Coenosiinae
- Tribe: Limnophorini
- Genus: Lispe
- Species: L. sociabilis

Binomial name
- Lispe sociabilis Loew, 1862

Species of fly

Lispe sociabilis is a species of house fly in the family Muscidae.

== Distribution ==
Canada, United States
