= Lispe albitarsis =

Scientific classification
- Domain: Eukaryota
- Kingdom: Animalia
- Phylum: Arthropoda
- Class: Insecta
- Order: Diptera
- Family: Muscidae
- Tribe: Limnophorini
- Genus: Lispe
- Species: L. albitarsis

Binomial name
- Lispe albitarsis (Stein, 1898)

Synonyms
- Lispa albitarsis Stein, 1898; Lispe alterna Stein, 1901; Lispe inculta Stein, 1901; Lispe vaccillans Stein, 1901

Species of fly

Lispe albitarsis is a species of house flies, etc. in the family Muscidae.
