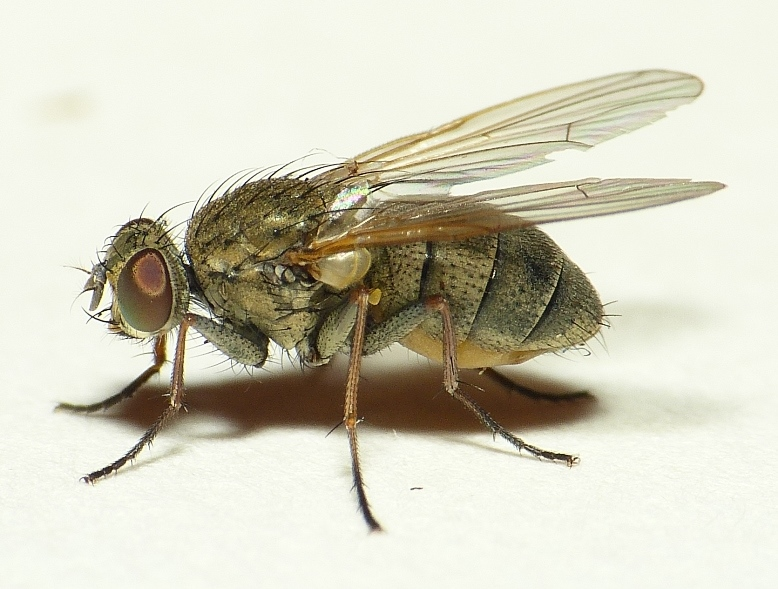
- Lispe pygmaea Netherlands

Scientific classification
- Kingdom: Animalia
- Phylum: Arthropoda
- Clade: Pancrustacea
- Class: Insecta
- Order: Diptera
- Family: Muscidae
- Genus: Lispe
- Species: L. pygmaea

Binomial name
- Lispe pygmaea (Fallen, 1825)

= Lispe pygmaea =

Species of fly

Lispe pygmaea is a fly from the family Muscidae. It is found in the Palearctic.
