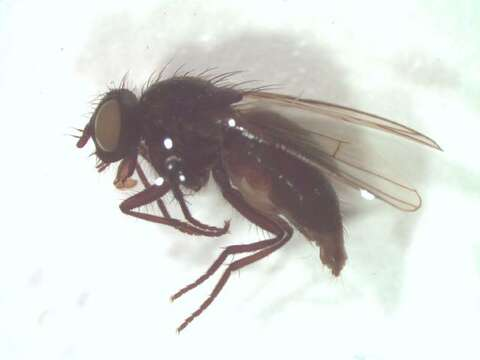
- Spilogona denigrata taken in 2014 by Dr. Jade Savage, at Bishop's University.

Scientific classification
- Kingdom: Animalia
- Phylum: Arthropoda
- Clade: Pancrustacea
- Class: Insecta
- Order: Diptera
- Family: Muscidae
- Genus: Spilogona
- Species: S. sanctipauli

Binomial name
- Spilogona sanctipauli (Malloch, 1921)

= Spilogona sanctipauli =

Species of fly

Spilogona sanctipauli is a species of fly from the family Muscidae first described by John Russell Malloch in 1921. It has a distribution across the high arctic and is a notable and important pollinator of the mountain avens. The species has been strongly correlated to successful seed setting and may be an integral character in arctic ecosystems. However, in some areas of Northeast Greenland, the species has experienced an 80% decline over the last two decades
