= Lispoides =

Scientific classification
- Domain: Eukaryota
- Kingdom: Animalia
- Phylum: Arthropoda
- Class: Insecta
- Order: Diptera
- Family: Muscidae
- Subfamily: Coenosiinae
- Tribe: Limnophorini
- Genus: Lispoides; Malloch, 1920

Genus of flies

Lispoides is a genus of house flies, etc. in the family Muscidae. There are about 17 described species in Lispoides.

== Species ==
These 17 species belong to the genus Lispoides:

- Lispoides abnorminervis (Stein, 1911)
- Lispoides aequifrons (Stein, 1898)
- Lispoides argenticeps Malloch, 1934
- Lispoides argentina Malloch, 1934
- Lispoides atrisquama (Stein, 1904)
- Lispoides diluta (Stein, 1911)
- Lispoides elegantula Pont, 1972
- Lispoides gracilis (Stein, 1911)
- Lispoides guatemala Snyder, 1951
- Lispoides insularis Hennig, 1957
- Lispoides laevis (Stein, 1911)
- Lispoides latifrons Snyder, 1957
- Lispoides lopesi Albuquerque, 1955
- Lispoides nigribasis (Stein, 1911)
- Lispoides propinqua (Stein, 1911)
- Lispoides triplex (Stein, 1911)
- Lispoides uniseta Malloch, 1934
