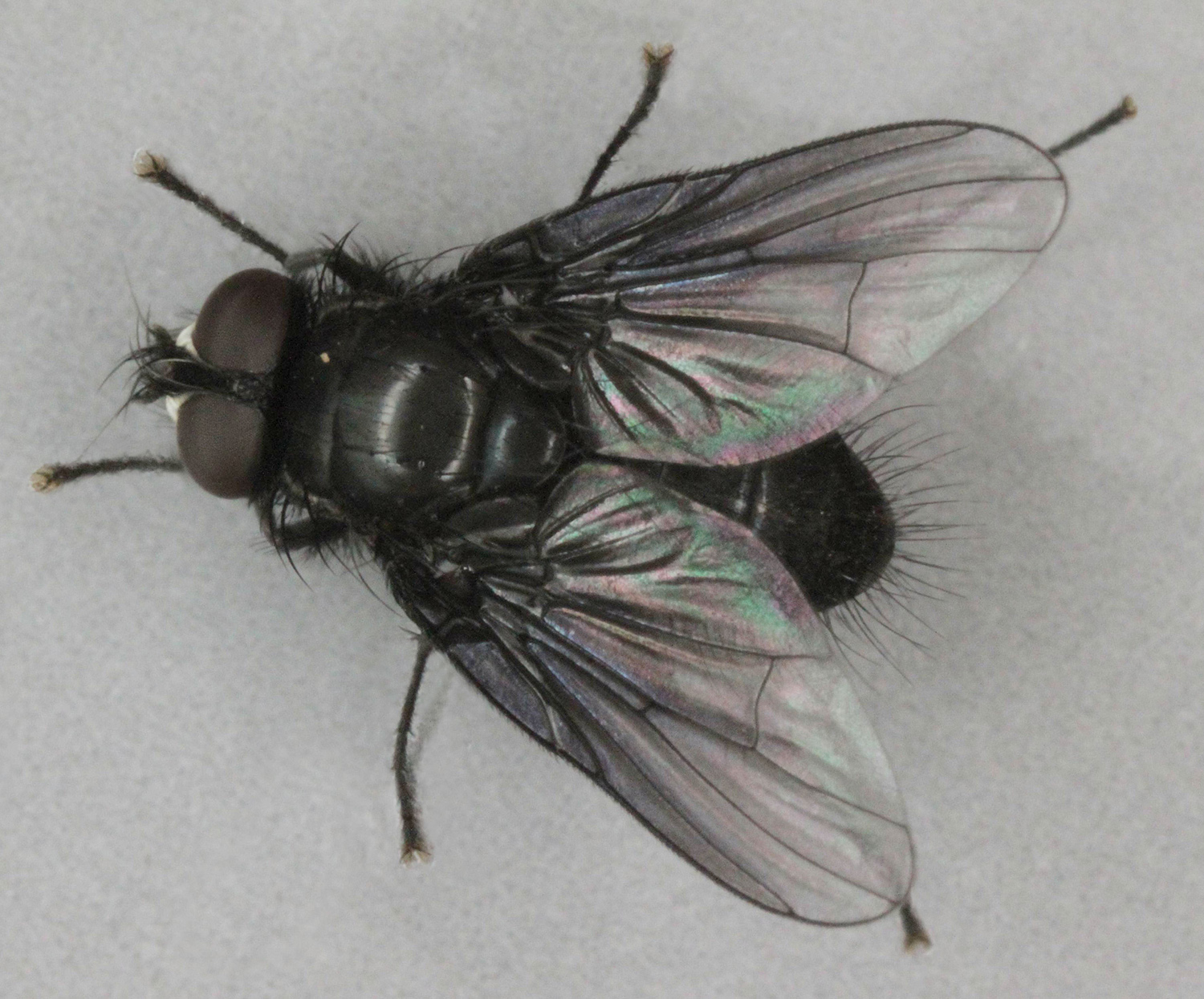
- Spilogona denigrata North Wales

Scientific classification
- Kingdom: Animalia
- Phylum: Arthropoda
- Clade: Pancrustacea
- Class: Insecta
- Order: Diptera
- Family: Muscidae
- Genus: Spilogona
- Species: S. denigrata

Binomial name
- Spilogona denigrata (Meigen, 1826)

= Spilogona denigrata =

Species of fly

Spilogona denigrata is a fly from the family Muscidae. It is found in the Palearctic.
