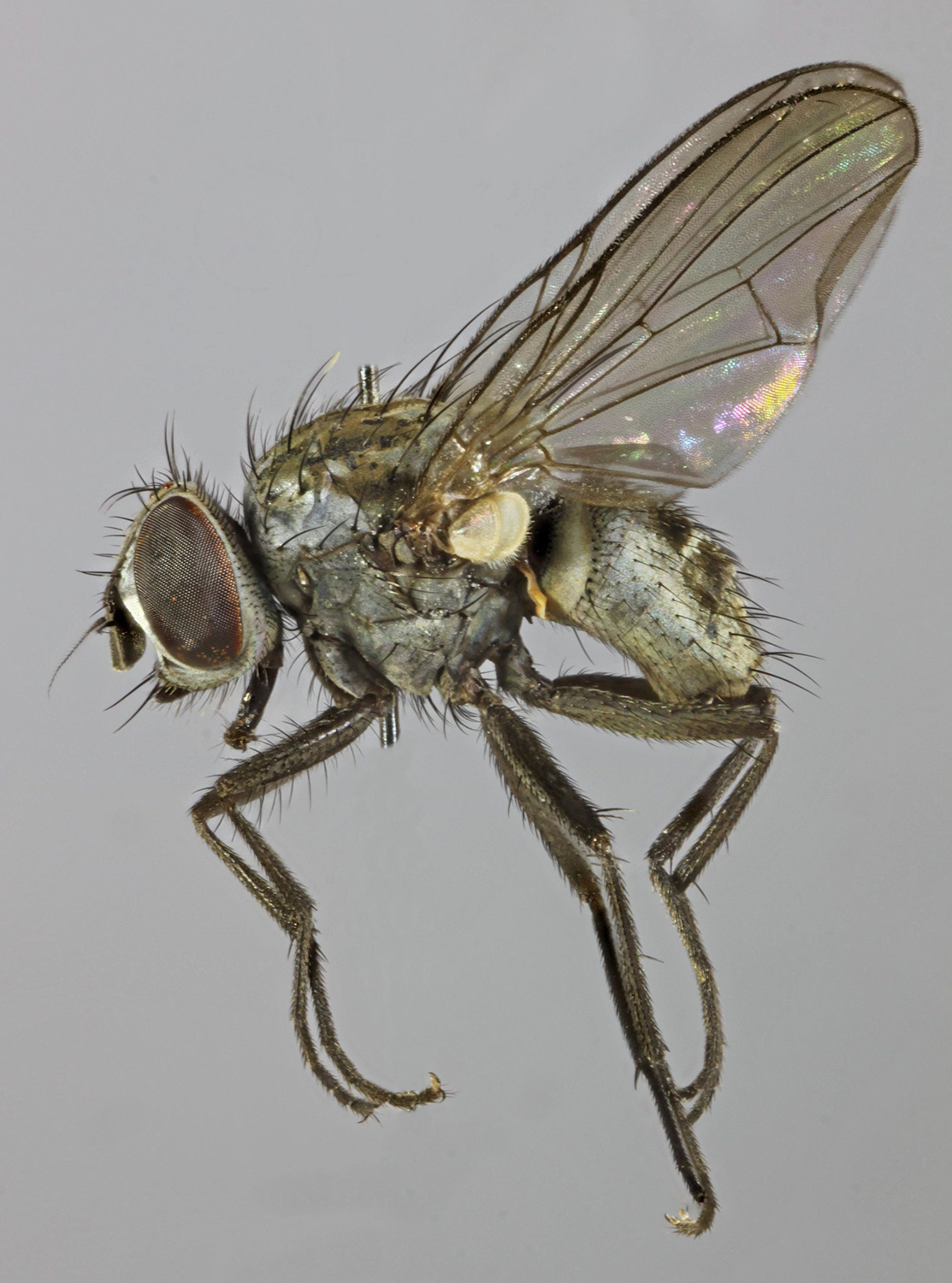
- Limnophora triangula North Wales

Scientific classification
- Kingdom: Animalia
- Phylum: Arthropoda
- Clade: Pancrustacea
- Class: Insecta
- Order: Diptera
- Family: Muscidae
- Genus: Limnophora
- Species: L. triangula

Binomial name
- Limnophora triangula (Fallén, 1825)

Synonyms
- Musca triangula Fallén, 1825; Cuculla cinerea Robineau-Desvoidy, 1830; Cuculla grisea Robineau-Desvoidy, 1830; Cuculla palustris Robineau-Desvoidy, 1830; Limnophora brunicosa Robineau-Desvoidy, 1830; Limnophora coenosa Robineau-Desvoidy, 1830; Anthomyia omissa Meigen, 1826

= Limnophora triangula =

Species of fly

Limnophora triangula is a fly from the family Muscidae. It is found in the Palearctic.
