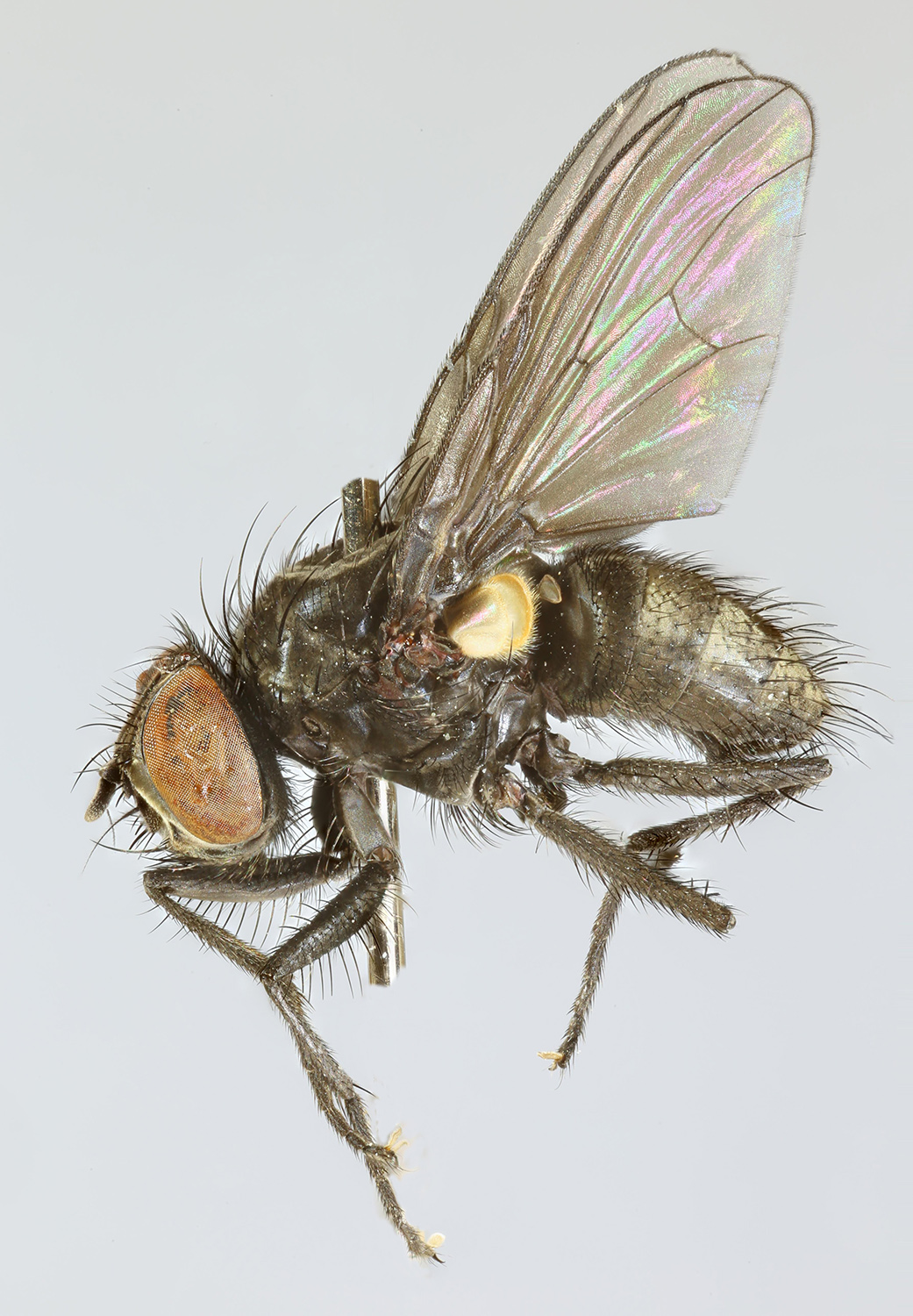
- Spilogona aerea North Wales

Scientific classification
- Kingdom: Animalia
- Phylum: Arthropoda
- Clade: Pancrustacea
- Class: Insecta
- Order: Diptera
- Family: Muscidae
- Genus: Spilogona
- Species: S. aerea

Binomial name
- Spilogona aerea (Fallen, 1825)

= Spilogona aerea =

Species of fly

Spilogona aerea is a fly from the family Muscidae. It is found in the Palearctic.
