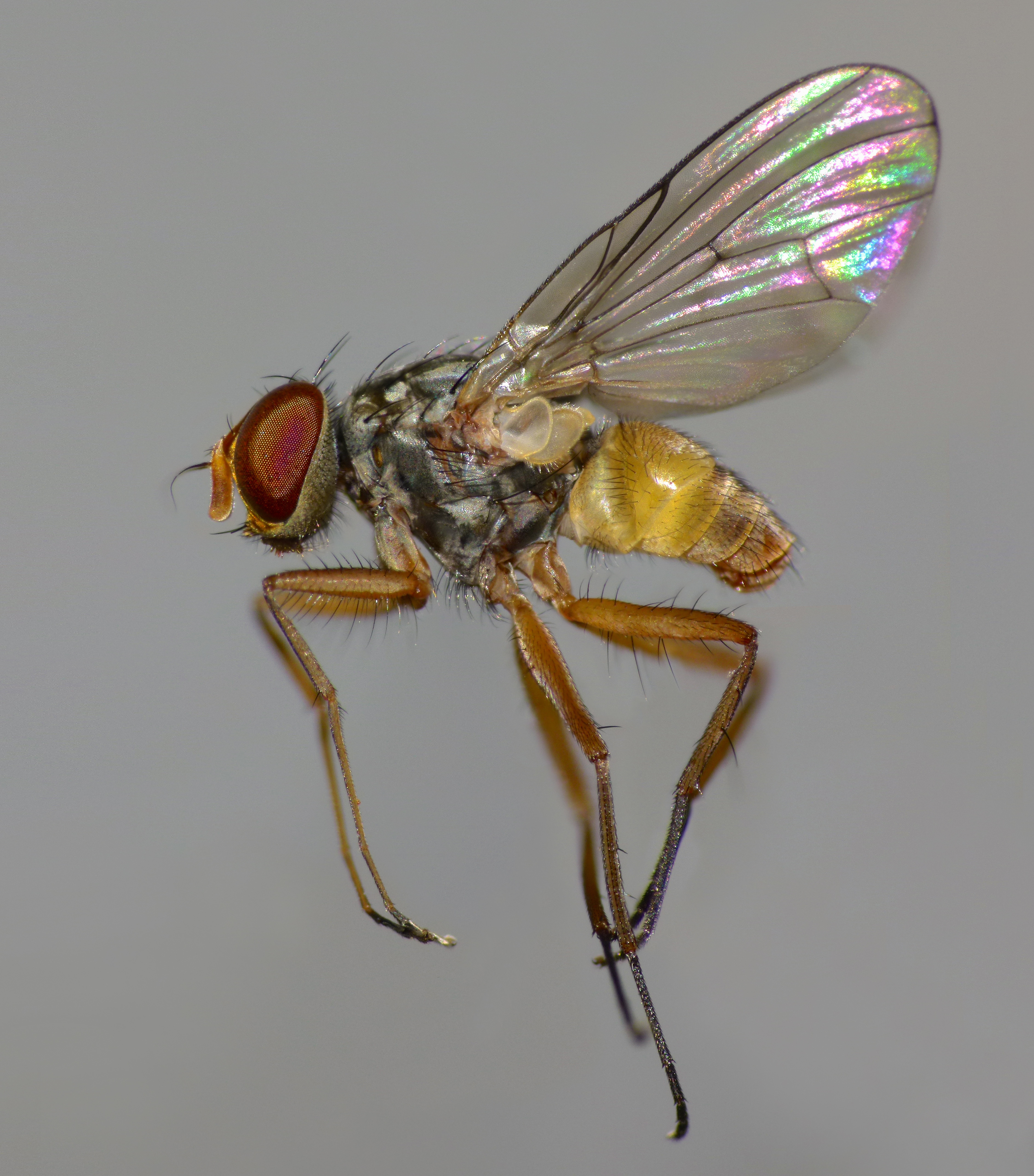
- Spilogona latimana Leith Saddle, Dunedin
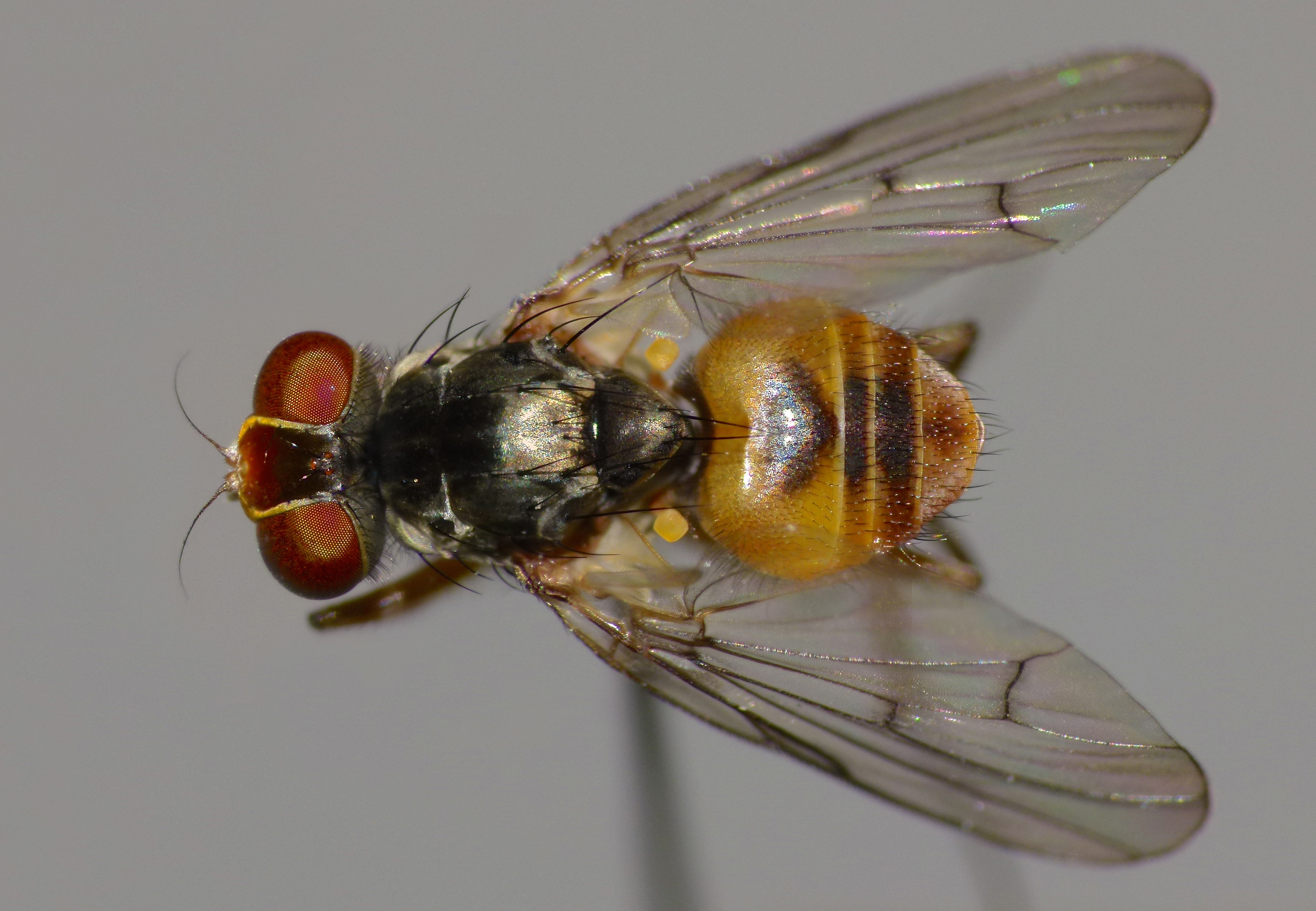
- Dorsal view

Scientific classification
- Kingdom: Animalia
- Phylum: Arthropoda
- Clade: Pancrustacea
- Class: Insecta
- Order: Diptera
- Family: Muscidae
- Genus: Spilogona
- Species: S. latimana

Binomial name
- Spilogona latimana Malloch, 1931

= Spilogona latimana =

Species of fly

Spilogona latimana is a fly from the family Muscidae. It is found in New Zealand.

== Description ==
The male of this species is readily identified by its golden frons and antennae, and distinctive forelegs with elongated thin foretarsi and spatulate tarsal terminal segments.

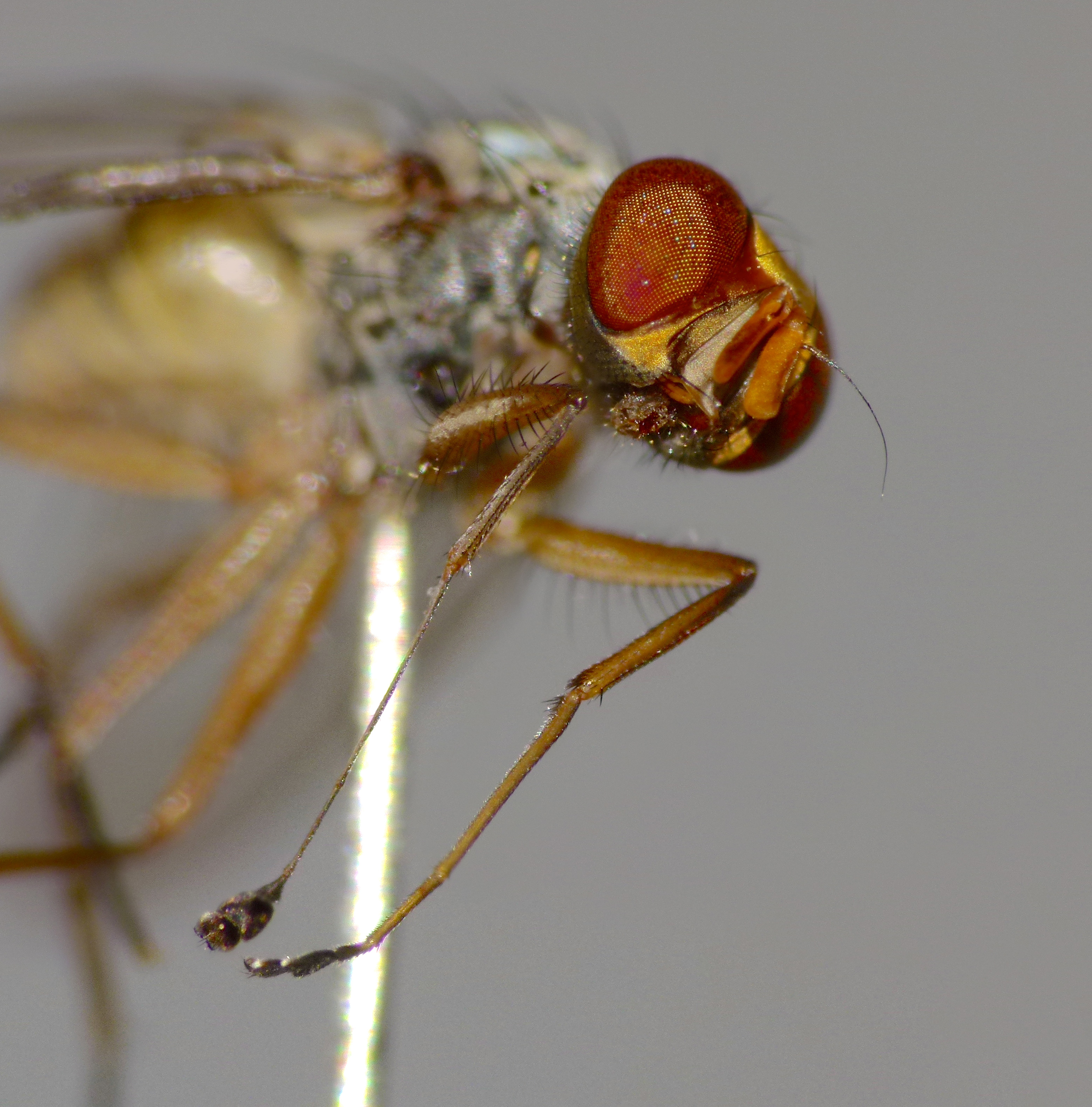
Spilogona latimana showing distinctive male secondary sexual characteristics (MSSCs)
