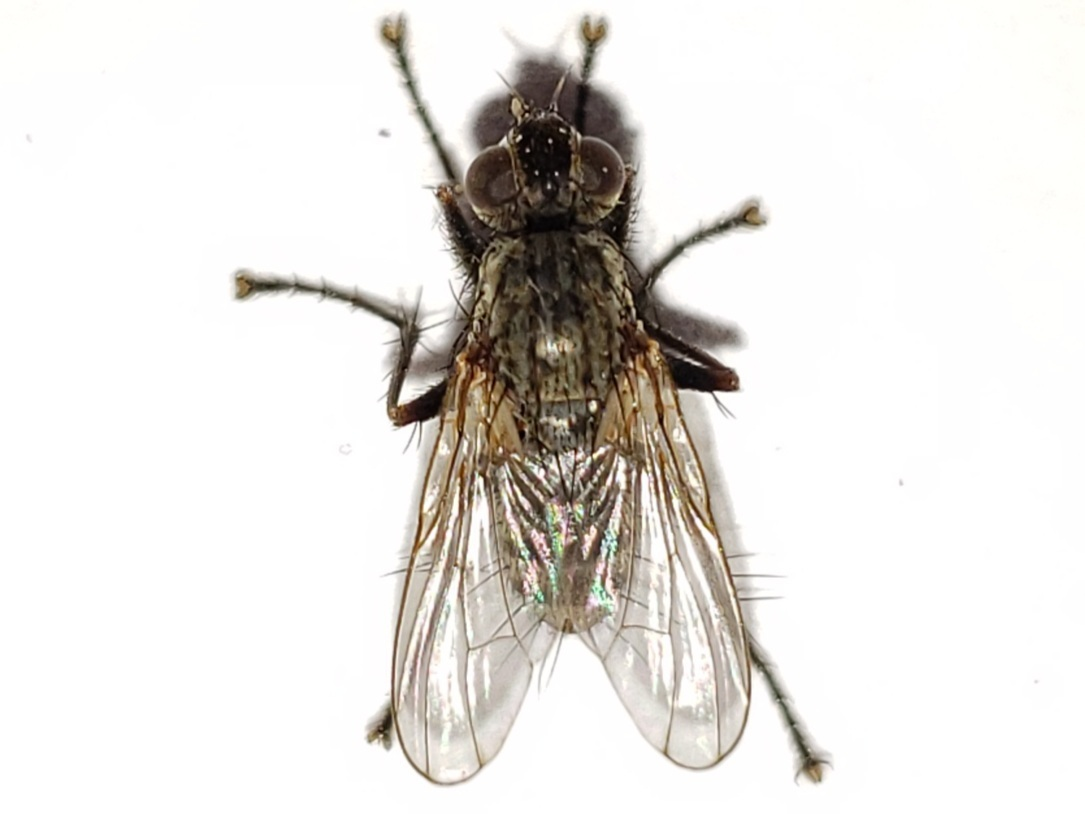

Scientific classification
- Kingdom: Animalia
- Phylum: Arthropoda
- Class: Insecta
- Order: Diptera
- Family: Muscidae
- Genus: Pachyceramyia
- Species: P. robusta

Binomial name
- Pachyceramyia robusta (Johnson, 1917)

Synonyms
- Phyllogaster maximus Stein, 1920; Phyllogaster robustus Johnson, 1917

= Pachyceramyia robusta =

Species of fly

Pachyceramyia robusta is a species of house fly in the family Muscidae.
