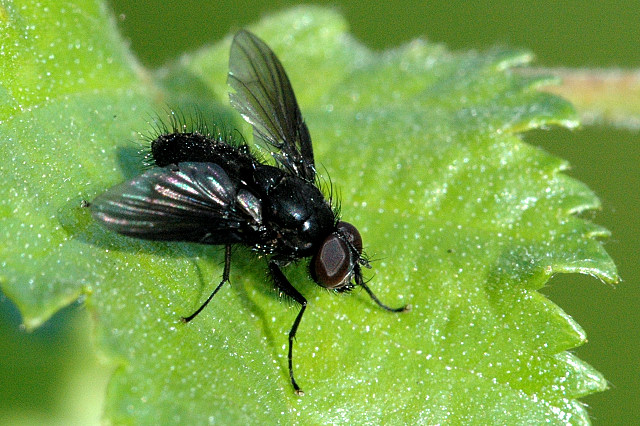
- Spilogona falleni

Scientific classification
- Kingdom: Animalia
- Phylum: Arthropoda
- Clade: Pancrustacea
- Class: Insecta
- Order: Diptera
- Family: Muscidae
- Subfamily: Coenosiinae
- Tribe: Limnophorini
- Genus: Spilogona; Schnabl, 1911

Type species
- Aricia carbonella Zetterstedt, 1845

Species
- See text

= Spilogona =

Genus of flies

Spilogona is a very large genus of flies from the family Muscidae.

== Species ==
- Spilogona acrostichalis (Stein, 1916)
- Spilogona acuticornis (Malloch, 1920
- Spilogona aenea Huckett, 1965
- Spilogona aerea (Fallén, 1825)
- Spilogona aestuarium Huckett, 1965
- Spilogona alberta (Huckett, 1932)
- Spilogona albifrons Malloch, 1931
- Spilogona albinepennis Huckett, 1965
- Spilogona albisquama (Ringdahl, 1932)
- Spilogona almqvistii (Holmgren, 1880)
- Spilogona alpica (Zetterstedt, 1845)
- Spilogona anthrax (Bigot, 1885)
- Spilogona arcticola Huckett, 1965
- Spilogona arenosa (Ringdahl, 1918)
- Spilogona argenticeps Malloch, 1924
- Spilogona argentifrons Malloch, 1931
- Spilogona argentiventris (Malloch, 1920)
- Spilogona atricans (Pandellé, 1899)
- Spilogona atrisquamula Hennig, 1959
- Spilogona aucklandica (Hutton, 1902)
- Spilogona aureifaces Malloch, 1931
- Spilogona austriaca (Ringdahl, 1948)
- Spilogona badia (Hutton, 1901)
- Spilogona baltica (Ringdahl, 1918)
- Spilogona barrowensis Huckett, 1965
- Spilogona bathurstiana Huckett, 1965
- Spilogona bifimbriata Huckett, 1965
- Spilogona biseriata (Stein, 1916)
- Spilogona bisetosa (Huckett, 1932)
- Spilogona brevicornis (Malloch, 1917)
- Spilogona broweri Huckett, 1973
- Spilogona brunneifrons Ringdahl, 1931
- Spilogona brunneinota (Harrison, 1955)
- Spilogona brunneisquama (Zetterstedt, 1845)
- Spilogona brunneivittata (Harrison, 1955)
- Spilogona calcaria Huckett, 1965
- Spilogona caliginosa (Stein, 1916)
- Spilogona cana (Huckett, 1932)
- Spilogona carbonaria (Hutton, 1901)
- Spilogona carbonella (Zetterstedt, 1845)
- Spilogona caroli (Malloch, 1920)
- Spilogona churchillensis Huckett, 1965
- Spilogona clarans (Huckett, 1932)
- Spilogona coachilis (Huckett, 1965)
- Spilogona comata (Huckett, 1932)
- Spilogona compacta Huckett, 1965
- Spilogona concolor (Stein, 1920)
- Spilogona concomitans Huckett, 1973
- Spilogona confluens Huckett, 1965
- Spilogona consortis Huckett, 1965
- Spilogona contigua Huckett, 1965
- Spilogona contractifrons (Zetterstedt, 1838)
- Spilogona crepusculenta (Huckett, 1932)
- Spilogona cretans (Huckett, 1932)
- Spilogona curvipes (Lamb, 1909)
- Spilogona dasyops (Stein, 1910)
- Spilogona deflorata (Holmgren, 1872)
- Spilogona denigrata (Meigen, 1826)
- Spilogona denudata (Holmgren, 1869)
- Spilogona depressiuscula (Zetterstedt, 1838)
- Spilogona depressula (Zetterstedt, 1845)
- Spilogona dispar (Fallén, 1823)
- Spilogona disparata Huckett, 1967
- Spilogona dolosa (Hutton, 1901)
- Spilogona dorsata (Zetterstedt, 1845)
- Spilogona dorsostriata Huckett, 1965
- Spilogona empeliogaster Huckett, 1965
- Spilogona enallos Huckett, 1965
- Spilogona extensa (Malloch, 1920)
- Spilogona falleni Pont, 1984
- Spilogona fatima (Huckett, 1932)
- Spilogona ferrari (Pont, 1973)
- Spilogona fimbriata (Schnabl, 1915)
- Spilogona firmidisetosa Huckett, 1965
- Spilogona flavinervis Huckett, 1965
- Spilogona flaviventris Malloch, 1931
- Spilogona forticula Huckett, 1965
- Spilogona frontulenta Huckett, 1965
- Spilogona fuliginosa (Hutton, 1901)
- Spilogona fulvescens (Hutton, 1901)
- Spilogona fulvibasis Huckett, 1965
- Spilogona fumicosta Malloch, 1931
- Spilogona genualis Huckett, 1965
- Spilogona gibsoni (Malloch, 1920)
- Spilogona griseola (Collin, 1930)
- Spilogona hudsoni Malloch, 1925
- Spilogona humeralis Huckett, 1965
- Spilogona hurdiana Huckett, 1965
- Spilogona hypopygialis Huckett, 1965
- Spilogona insularis (Lamb, 1909)
- Spilogona imitatrix (Malloch, 1921)
- Spilogona incauta (Huckett, 1932)
- Spilogona incerta Huckett, 1965
- Spilogona infuscata Huckett, 1965
- Spilogona instans (Huckett, 1932)
- Spilogona karelica (Tiensuu, 1936)
- Spilogona katahdin Huckett, 1973
- Spilogona krogerusi (Ringdahl, 1941)
- Spilogona kuntzei (Schnabl, 1911)
- Spilogona lapponica (Ringdahl, 1932)
- Spilogona lasiophthalma (Lamb, 1909)
- Spilogona latilamina (Collin, 1930)
- Spilogona latimana Malloch, 1931
- Spilogona leucogaster (Zetterstedt, 1838)
- Spilogona limnophorina (Stein, 1898)
- Spilogona limpida (Hutton, 1901)
- Spilogona litorea (Fallén, 1823)
- Spilogona maculipennis (Hutton, 1901)
- Spilogona magnipunctata (Malloch, 1919)
- Spilogona malaisei (Ringdahl, 1920)
- Spilogona marginifera Hennig, 1959
- Spilogona marina (Collin, 1921)
- Spilogona meadei (Schnabl, 1915)
- Spilogona medialis Huckett, 1965
- Spilogona megastoma (Boheman, 1866)
- Spilogona melanosoma (Huckett, 1932)
- Spilogona melas (Schiner, 1868)
- Spilogona micans (Ringdahl, 1918)
- Spilogona minuta (Harrison, 1955)
- Spilogona minycalyptrata Huckett, 1965
- Spilogona monacantha (Collin, 1930)
- Spilogona murina Huckett, 1965
- Spilogona mydaeinaformis Huckett, 1965
- Spilogona narina (Walker, 1849)
- Spilogona neglecta Huckett, 1965
- Spilogona nigerrima Huckett, 1965
- Spilogona nigrifemur Malloch, 1925
- Spilogona nigriventris (Zetterstedt, 1845)
- Spilogona nitidicauda (Schnabl, 1911)
- Spilogona nobilis (Stein, 1898)
- Spilogona nordenskioldi (Holmgren, 1883)
- Spilogona norvegica (Ringdahl, 1932)
- Spilogona novemmaculata (Zetterstedt, 1860)
- Spilogona nutara Huckett, 1965
- Spilogona obscura (Malloch, 1919)
- Spilogona obscuripennis (Stein, 1916)
- Spilogona obsoleta (Malloch, 1920)
- Spilogona ocularia (Villeneuve, 1922)
- Spilogona opaca (Schnabl, 1915)
- Spilogona ordinata (Hutton, 1901)
- Spilogona pacifica (Meigen, 1826)
- Spilogona padlei Huckett, 1965
- Spilogona palmeni (Ringdahl, 1935)
- Spilogona parvimaculata (Stein, 1920)
- Spilogona pennata Malloch, 1925
- Spilogona perambulata Huckett, 1965
- Spilogona placida (Huckett, 1932)
- Spilogona princeps Huckett, 1965
- Spilogona projecta Huckett, 1965
- Spilogona pruinella (Huckett, 1932)
- Spilogona pseudodispar (Frey, 1915)
- Spilogona puberula (Ringdahl, 1918)
- Spilogona pulchra (Huckett, 1932)
- Spilogona pulvicrura (Huckett, 1932)
- Spilogona pusilla (Huckett, 1932)
- Spilogona pygmaea Ringdahl, 1951
- Spilogona quinquelineata (Zetterstedt, 1838)
- Spilogona rapax (Hutton, 1901)
- Spilogona reflecta (Huckett, 1932)
- Spilogona robusta Huckett, 1965
- Spilogona rostrata (Ringdahl, 1932)
- Spilogona rufa (Hutton, 1902)
- Spilogona rufitarsis (Stein, 1920)
- Spilogona salmita Huckett, 1965
- Spilogona sanctipauli (Malloch, 1921)
- Spilogona scutulata (Schnabl, 1911)
- Spilogona sectata (Huckett, 1932)
- Spilogona semiglobosa (Ringdahl, 1916)
- Spilogona separata Huckett, 1965
- Spilogona septemnotata (Zetterstedt, 1845)
- Spilogona septentrionalis (Ringdahl, 1918)
- Spilogona seticaudalis Huckett, 1965
- Spilogona setigera (Stein, 1907)
- Spilogona setilamellata (Huckett, 1932)
- Spilogona setinervis (Huckett, 1932)
- Spilogona setipes Huckett, 1965
- Spilogona setulosa (Ringdahl, 1941)
- Spilogona sjostedti (Ringdahl, 1926)
- Spilogona solitariana (Collin, 1921)
- Spilogona sorenseni (Harrison, 1955)
- Spilogona sordidipennis (Holmgren, 1883)
- Spilogona sororcula (Zetterstedt, 1845)
- Spilogona sospita (Huckett, 1932)
- Spilogona spectabilis (Tiensuu, 1938)
- Spilogona spinicostalis Huckett, 1965
- Spilogona spininervis (Villeneuve, 1922)
- Spilogona subnotata Huckett, 1965
- Spilogona surda (Zetterstedt, 1845)
- Spilogona suspecta (Malloch, 1920)
- Spilogona tendipes (Malloch, 1920)
- Spilogona tenuicornis Malloch, 1923
- Spilogona tenuis Hennig, 1959
- Spilogona tetrachaeta (Malloch, 1920)
- Spilogona tornensis (Ringdahl, 1926)
- Spilogona torreyae (Johannsen, 1916)
- Spilogona triangulifera (Zetterstedt, 1838)
- Spilogona trianguligera (Zetterstedt, 1838)
- Spilogona trigonata (Zetterstedt, 1838)
- Spilogona trigonifera (Zetterstedt, 1838)
- Spilogona trilineata (Huckett, 1932)
- Spilogona tundrae (Schnabl, 1915)
- Spilogona tundrarum Huckett, 1965
- Spilogona tundrica (Schnabl, 1911)
- Spilogona turbidipennis Huckett, 1965
- Spilogona varsaviensis Schnabl, 1911
- Spilogona veterrima (Zetterstedt, 1845)
- Spilogona villosa (Hutton, 1902)
