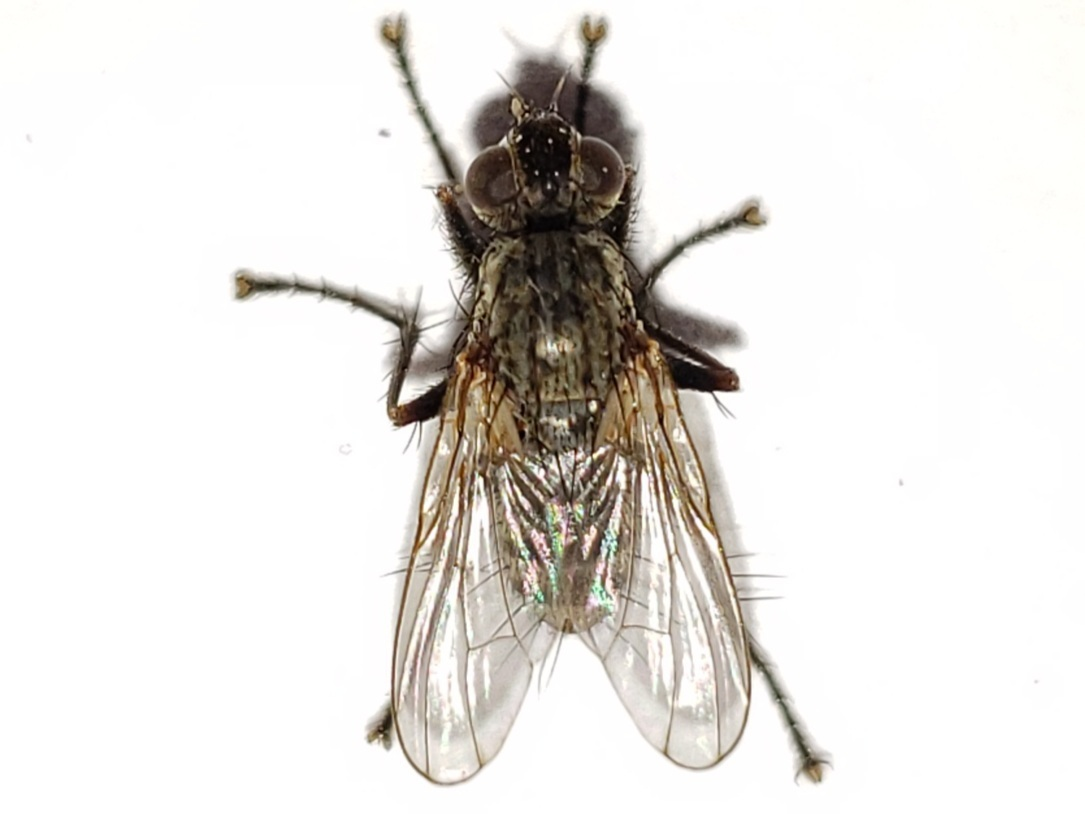
- Pachyceramyia robusta

Scientific classification
- Kingdom: Animalia
- Phylum: Arthropoda
- Class: Insecta
- Order: Diptera
- Family: Muscidae
- Tribe: Limnophorini
- Genus: Pachyceramyia; Albuquerque, 1955

= Pachyceramyia =

Genus of flies

Pachyceramyia is a genus of house flies in the family Muscidae. There are about six described species in the genus Pachyceramyia.

== Species ==
- Pachyceramyia cordyluroides (Atein, 1898)
- Pachyceramyia littoralis (Malloch, 1917)
- Pachyceramyia longispina (Malloch, 1923)
- Pachyceramyia mallitosa (Huckett, 1936)
- Pachyceramyia parvimaculata (Stein, 1920)
- Pachyceramyia robusta (Johnson, 1917)
