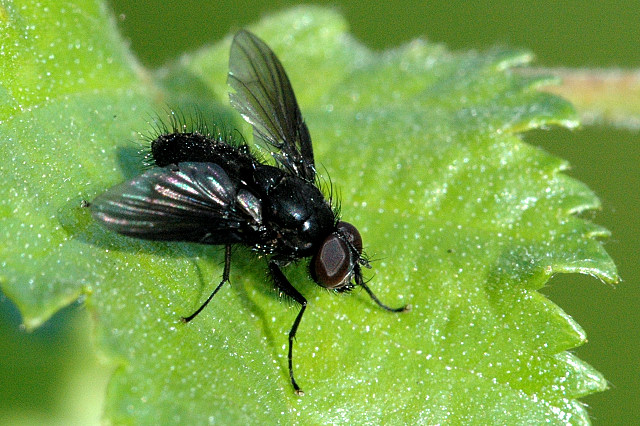

Scientific classification
- Kingdom: Animalia
- Phylum: Arthropoda
- Class: Insecta
- Order: Diptera
- Family: Muscidae
- Genus: Spilogona
- Species: S. falleni

Binomial name
- Spilogona falleni Pont, 1984

= Spilogona falleni =

Species of fly

Spilogona falleni is a species of fly which is distributed across many parts of the Palaearctic.
