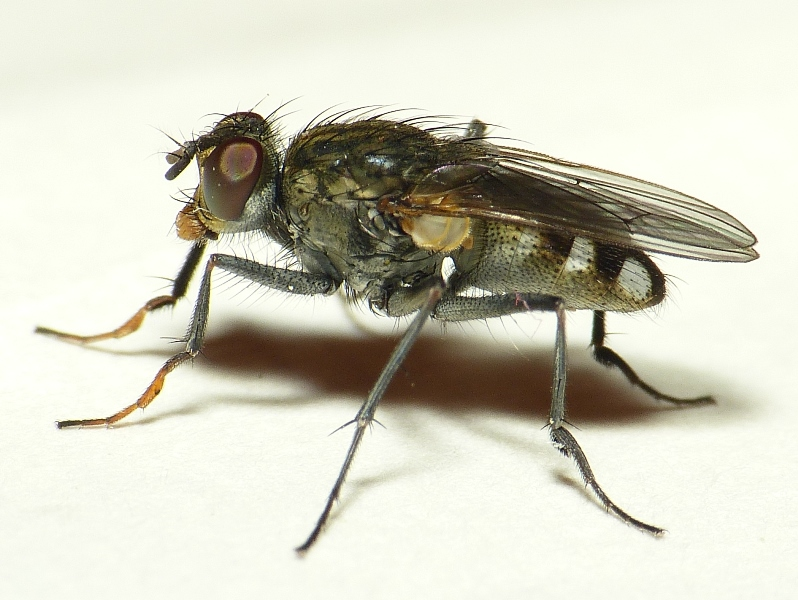
- Lispe tentaculata Netherlands

Scientific classification
- Kingdom: Animalia
- Phylum: Arthropoda
- Clade: Pancrustacea
- Class: Insecta
- Order: Diptera
- Family: Muscidae
- Subfamily: Coenosiinae
- Tribe: Limnophorini
- Genus: Lispe
- Species: L. tentaculata

Binomial name
- Lispe tentaculata (De Geer, 1776)

= Lispe tentaculata =

Species of fly

Lispe tentaculata is a fly from the family Muscidae. It is found in the Palearctic.

Lispe tentaculata male Video
