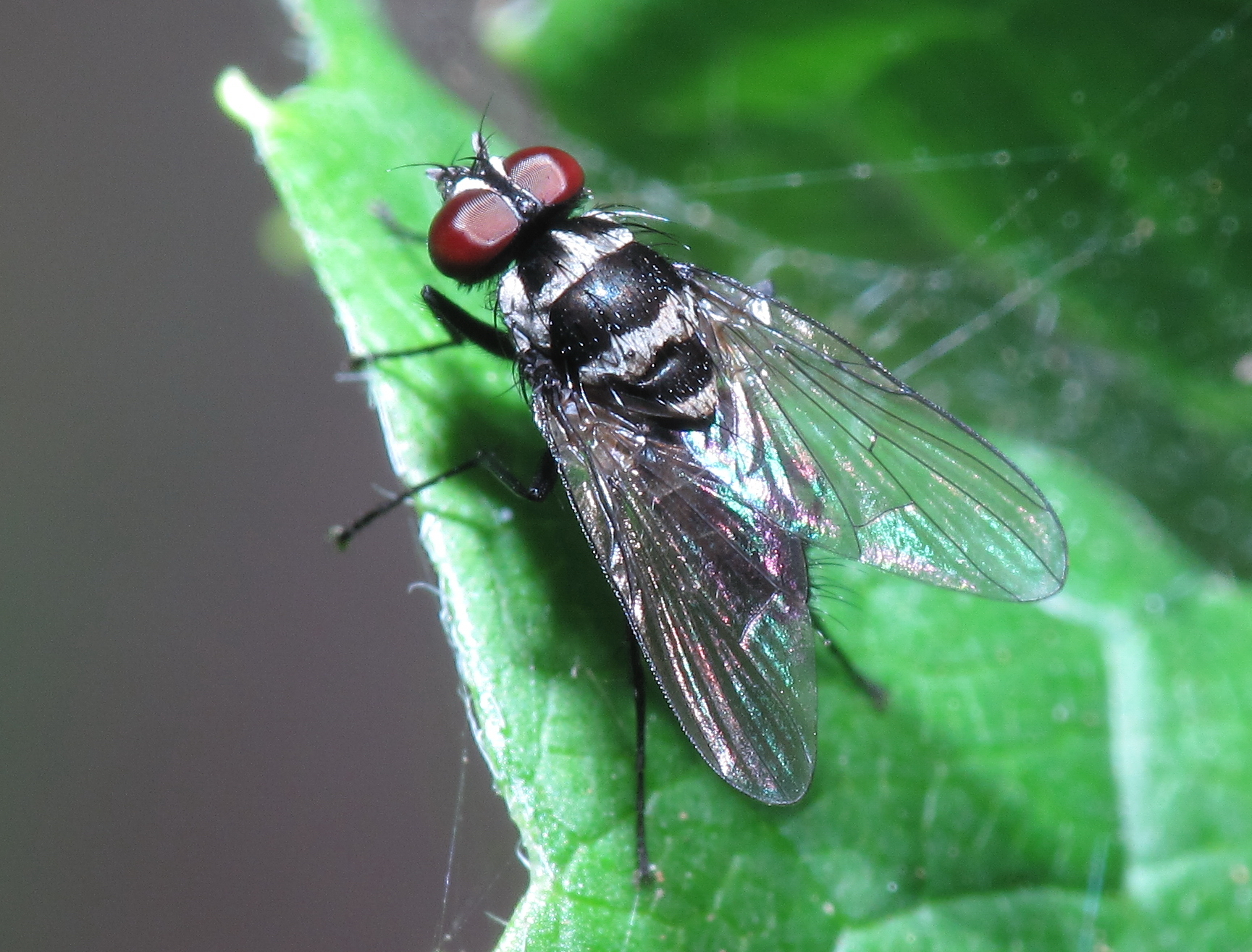
- Limnophora tigrina

Scientific classification
- Kingdom: Animalia
- Phylum: Arthropoda
- Class: Insecta
- Order: Diptera
- Family: Muscidae
- Subfamily: Coenosiinae
- Tribe: Limnophorini
- Genus: Limnophora; Robineau-Desvoidy, 1830

Type species
- Limnophora palustris Robineau-Desvoidy, 1830

= Limnophora =

Genus of flies

Limnophora is a genus of flies, belonging to the family Muscidae. The flies are characterized by silver bands across their thorax. The tribe Limnophorini is named from the genus.

The genus includes the following species:

- Limnophora corvina (Giglio-Tos, 1893)
- Limnophora discreta Stein, 1898
- Limnophora femorata (Malloch, 1913)
- Limnophora garrula (Giglio-Tos, 1893)
- Limnophora groenlandica Malloch, 1920
- Limnophora incrassata Malloch, 1919
- Limnophora invada Huckett, 1966
- Limnophora minuscula (Wulp, 1896)
- Limnophora narona Walker
- Limnophora nigripes (Robineau-Desvoidy, 1830)
- Limnophora normata Bigot, 1885
- Limnophora rotundata (Collin, 1930)
- Limnophora sinuata Collin, 1930
- Limnophora triangula (Fallén, 1825)
- Limnophora uniseta Stein, 1916
