= Lispe =

- Male Lispe tentaculata

Scientific classification
- Kingdom: Animalia
- Phylum: Arthropoda
- Class: Insecta
- Order: Diptera
- Family: Muscidae
- Tribe: Limnophorini
- Genus: Lispe; Latreille, 1796

Type species
- Musca tentaculata De Geer, 1776

Diversity
- at least 170 species

Genus of flies

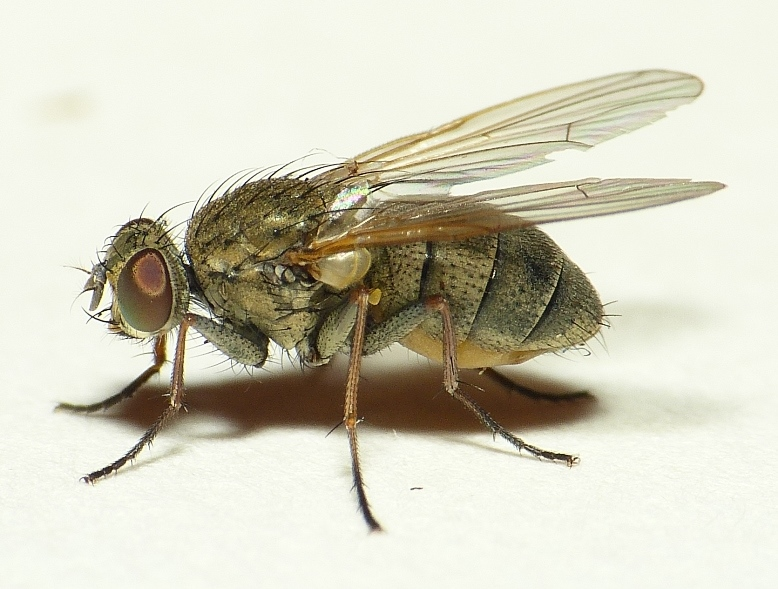
Lispe pygmaea

Lispe is a genus of true flies belonging to the family Muscidae.

The adults are predators of small insects. Larvae are also predators, and live in damp sand and mud.

== See also ==
- List of Lispe species
