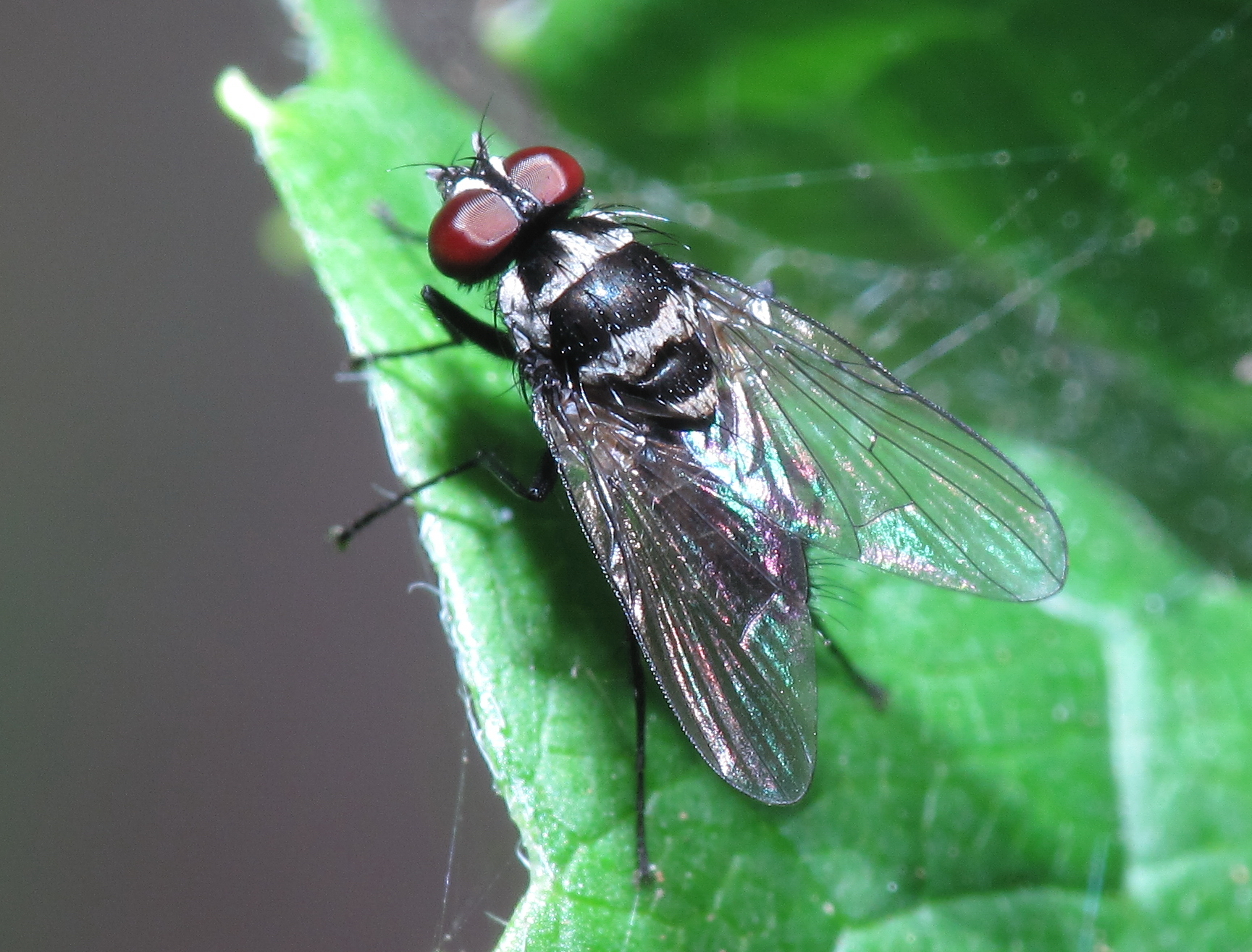
- Limnophora tigrina

Scientific classification
- Kingdom: Animalia
- Phylum: Arthropoda
- Clade: Pancrustacea
- Class: Insecta
- Order: Diptera
- Family: Muscidae
- Subfamily: Coenosiinae
- Tribe: Limnophorini; Villeneuve, 1902

Genera
- See text

= Limnophorini =

Tribe of flies

The Limnophorini are a tribe of flies, belonging to the family Muscidae. Although the name-giving genus is Limnophora, this was actually described only after the more characteristic and easily recognized Lispe.

== Genera ==
Genera are:

- Agenamyia Albuquerque, 1953
- Albertinella Couri & Carvalho, 2005
- Drepanocnemis Stein, 1911
- Limnophora Robineau-Desvoidy, 1830
- Lispe Latreille, 1796
- Lispoides Malloch, 1917
- Pachyceramyia Albuquerque, 1955
- Rhabdotoptera Stein, 1919
- Spilogona Schnabl, 1911
- Syllimnophora Speiser, 1923
- Tetramerinx Berg, 1898
- Thaumasiochaeta Stein, 1911
- Villeneuvia Schnabl & Dziedzicki, 1911
