= Wikishuffle =

Comedy podcast

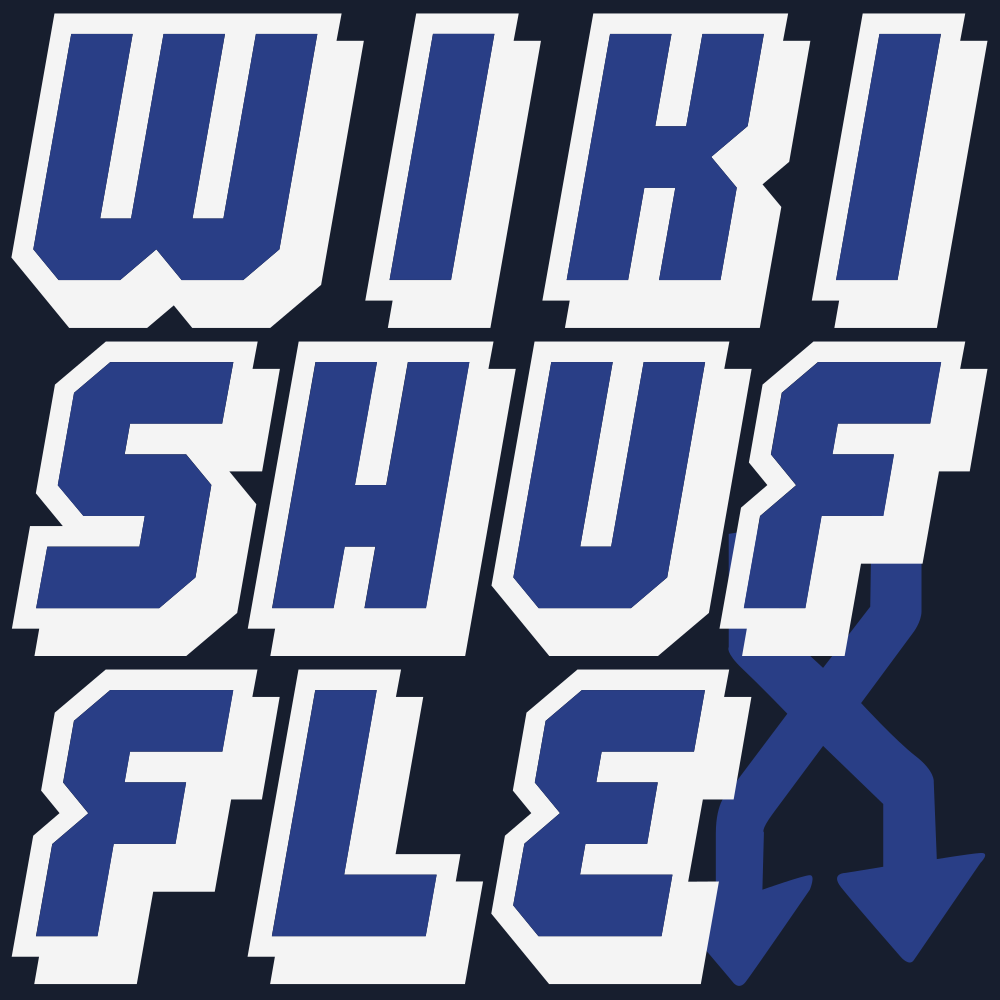
- Wikishuffle Logo
- Genre: Comedy
- Language: English

Cast and voices
- Hosted by: Jack Stewart, Chris Wallace, Philip Sharman

Production
- Length: 30 to 60 minutes

Publication
- No. of episodes: 104
- Original release: 14 April 2015 – 29 March 2017
- Provider: acast
- Updates: Every Tuesday

Reception
- Cited for: Winner Best Comedy, 2015 UK Podcasters Awards

Related
- Website: http://www.wikishuffle.co.uk

Wikishuffle was a UK comedy podcast presented by Jack Stewart, Chris Wallace and Philip Sharman, reliant on the Wikipedia random article button for content.

On 12 September 2015 Wikishuffle was awarded the title of Best Comedy Podcast at the 2015 UK Podcasters Awards hosted by New Media Europe.

== Format ==
The subject material for the podcast is determined by pressing the random article button in the English Wikipedia. Each episode features between one and four articles discussed by the host, with excerpts read directly from the article and commented upon. New episodes are released every Tuesday with occasional bonus episodes focusing on articles chosen by the presenters, suggested by listeners, or occasionally brought in by guests.

The podcast is hosted by Jack Stewart, who is also responsible for the technical and editing duties. Philip Sharman takes responsibility for reading out the articles, while Chris Wallace provides interjections. The tone is generally humorous, but the show also covers serious articles, such as the 2011 San Fernando massacre, and discusses political and current affairs topics in the context of the random articles that are selected.

The show also features more general news items in relation to Wikipedia and advocates the importance of the site as an educational and societal resource, and encourages listeners to donate to the Wikimedia Foundation.

The format is dependent upon a high level of listener interaction, with communication encouraged via social media and through the post.

Various running jokes have been established, including the prevalence of moth articles, the disproportionate number of articles covered which make reference to Scranton, Pennsylvania and Sharman's age and inability to keep up-to-date with modern technologies and culture.

== History ==
Stewart and Wallace began podcasting in early 2015, with a podcast called Not This Again, recorded in Stewart's spare room The show was interview based and, after the pair began to find difficulty in securing a regular supply of interviewees, they started to look for an alternative format to differentiate them from the large number of independent podcasts available.

Philip Sharman had been a guest on Not This Again and spoke with Stewart and Wallace about an idea he had for developing a Wikipedia podcast. The initial idea was for a serious, documentary style podcast, using the random article button to seed stories. However, it became clear that the three presenters were better suited to a more lighthearted approach, resulting in the development of the current format.

The first three episodes were released together on 14 April 2015, hosted by the Swedish podcasting service Acast.

In August 2015, the recording of the podcast moved from Corby to a dedicated recording studio in Kettering, Northamptonshire, referred to in the podcast as Wikishuffle HQ.

The 50th episode of Wikishuffle was released on 2 February 2016. On 24 January 2017 the podcast celebrated its 100th episode with a special 2 hour long entry featuring articles selected by the presenters. In episode 101 it was announced that Jack would be leaving the podcast indefinitely to go find himself in Asia. Two more episodes were released with friend of the show Ruth Bradley filling in for Jack, and a two year hiatus then followed the release of episode 103 on 28 March 2017. In 2019, a compilation episode was released, entitled Wikishuffle: The Best Bits. This contained over 90 minutes of clips from previous episodes, interspersed with Jack providing context for some of the clips, as well as explaining that various attempts had been made for the 3 to record together but had been unsuccessful.

In May 2020, the 104th episode was released. This was recorded during the UK's first COVID lockdown, and was described during the episode as a "one-off special", and "probably" the final episode. Jack, Philip and Chris updated the listeners on their lives, and covered an article on Wojtek, a bear who had been adopted by a Polish army corps during World War II. The article was selected by Chris, as one of the show's running jokes involved Chris' fondness of "animals with jobs".

== Critical response ==
Wikishuffle has received favourable reviews from an international audience.

On 12 September 2015 Wikishuffle won the Best Comedy Podcast category at the inaugural UK Podcasters Awards hosted by New Media Europe sponsored by Spreaker. The award was accepted by Wallace and Sharman at the ceremony which took place at the Midland Hotel, Manchester.

== Articles covered ==
The following Wikipedia articles have been covered by Wikishuffle:

No.	Episode Title	Article 1	Article 2	Article 3	Article 4	Release Date	Notes
001	Pilot	List of civilian casualties in the war in Afghanistan (2011)	Coleophora berdjanski	A77 motorway (Netherlands)	-	14 April 2015	No Longer Available
002	Down 'n' Dirty	Wendy Richard	Kelly Bell	-	-	14 April 2015	-
003	Shuffle it Again, Sam	Play It Again, Sam (film)	Gust of Wind	-	-	14 April 2015	-
004	Okay, Mother	1950–51 United States network television schedule (weekday)	-	-	-	21 April 2015	-
005	Bruce Chickinson	Guðjón Valur Sigurðsson	The Iron Maidens	Sible Hedingham	-	28 April 2015	-
006	Other Buttons	Dump digging	Scripps National Spelling Bee	-	-	5 May 2015	-
007	Double Bogey	Amber Leaf	Charles Lynch (judge)	Relentless (Jo O'Meara album)	Hole in One (2010 film)	12 May 2015	-
008	Man Don't Give a Fuck	Robin Friday	-	-	-	15 May 2015	Bonus episode – Jack's selection
009	The Flabbergasted Traveller	Queen of Sheba	You've Got a Friend in Me	-	-	19 May 2015	-
010	The False Prophet	Eevee	Demob suit	2005 in England	Hervé This	26 May 2015	-
011	But then there's this	2011 San Fernando massacre	Bambi II	-	-	2 June 2015	-
012	Phil 'em Up	K.C. Rivers	Marvin Mitchelson	List of Arab Astronauts	List of celebrity appearances in video games	9 June 2015	-
013	Keith Ferrari	Ghostwatch	-	-	-	12 June 2015	Bonus episode – Chris's selection
014	D-I-V-O-R-C-E	Mr. Snuffleupagus	Underachiever	Wanda Ramey	-	16 June 2015	-
015	(Television Carpenter)	National Bingo Night (U.S. game show)	Æthelred of Wessex	-	-	23 June 2015	-
016	On Board with the Nazis	List of number-one hits of 1996 (Germany)	Dead Snow: Red vs. Dead	-	-	30 June 2015	-
017	Juicy	Brian Kendrick	Peter Moore (businessman)	-	-	7 July 2015	-
018	Ode to Bin Laden	The Landt Trio	Samantha Lewthwaite	-	-	14 July 2015	-
019	Got Blood?	List of sexually active popes	-	-	-	17 July 2015	Bonus episode – Phil's selection
020	All Aboard HMS Blazer	47th Primetime Emmy Awards	Ben Fogle	-	-	21 July 2015	-
021	No Marine Biologists	Vandellia	Jazmin's Touch	-	-	28 July 2015	-
022	Goths Really Love Puns	Hot blast	The Sick's Sense	-	-	4 August 2015	-
023	ConCATenated	Oscar (therapy cat)	Adamski	-	-	11 August 2015	First episode recorded at Wikishuffle HQ
024	Into the Void	Toby Terrier	Eliza Winston	Vantablack	-	18 August 2015	-
025	Dave Days & Lemonade Mouth	Josias Philip Hoffman	Who Says (Selena Gomez & the Scene song)	-	-	25 August 2015	-
026	Cowboys and Antmen	Head spade	George Scarborough	Ant (comedian)	-	1 September 2015	-
027	Marvel Universe Phase Nine	Goldballs	Nela Zisser	February 2010 Lower Dir bombing	-	8 September 2015	-
028	Love Buffet	Parfait Tic!	Anthomyia	Adolf Hitler's 50th birthday	-	8 September 2015	-
029	Too Cool for Poole	Poole	Danny Orleans	Nasal septum perforation	-	22 September 2015	First episode after winning UK Podcasters award
030	Hairy Hat Men	Letterland	Pinnated Bittern	The Beggar's Benison	-	29 September 2015	-
031	Fifty Shades of Pink	Lin Wang	Shades of pink	Sinchon massacre	-	6 October 2015	-
032	Chitterling Chatter	Donkeyskin	Black pudding	Goldeneye (estate)	-	13 October 2015	-
033	S Club 0.2857	Brum (TV series)	Seth Neddermeyer	Negotiate with Love	-	20 October 2015	-
034	Toilegami	Friday the 13th (1989 video game)	Hotel toilet paper folding	Betty Boop's Big Boss	-	27 October 2015	Halloween Special
035	It's No Joke Living in Barnsley	Round the Bend	Ferret-legging	John Titor	-	30 October 2015	Bonus episode – listener selection
036	A Bit Gamesy Thronesy	Robert Barclay Allardice	Nepalese royal massacre	-	-	3 November 2015	-
037	Viva von Babenhausens	Adrian Carton di Wiart	-	-	-	5 November 2015	Bonus episode – listener selection
038	Bronze Beaver	Goldy Gopher	Rattlesnake Annie	-	-	10 November 2015	-
039	The Bollock Hurdle	Smut (fungus)	GAZelle	John Rann	-	17 November 2015	-
040	Spiteful Conkling	Roscoe Arbuckle	Alfie and His Secret Friend	-	-	24 November 2015	-
041	Chocolate Lady Mousse	Boab Prison Tree, Wyndham	Naked Jungle	-	-	1 December 2015	-
042	Sinking Ship	Benjamin Guggenheim	Aqua (band)	-	-	8 December 2015	-
043	For the Good of Mankind	1998 Hell in a Cell match	Jamie Vardy	-	-	15 December 2015	2015 Christmas special 1
044	The Perfect Blend	Gold Blend couple	Unit 731	-	-	22 December 2015	2015 Christmas special 2
045	Ya Still Tickle Me	April O'Neil	The Notorious B.I.G.	-	-	29 December 2015	2015 Christmas special 3
046	Tropical House: A Beginner's Guide	List of mentally ill monarchs	Jolly Jack's Lost Mine	-	-	5 January 2016	-
047	Runaway Twain	BonBon-Land	Derek Hersey	The Naked Woman and the Gun	-	12 January 2016	-
048	Welcome to the Hippo Campus	Martin van Butchell	Death from laughter	-	-	19 January 2016	-
049	Henry Maar's Sinister Twisting	Roy Mackal	Thankful villages	Balloon modelling	-	26 January 2016	-
050	Lying to the Pizza Man	Victorian mourning dolls	Blobfish	Sentinelese people	Bernard Matthews Ltd	2 February 2016	-
051	All You Can Diddle	Habbo	Titus Young	-	-	9 February 2016	-
052	The Lizard Layer	David Icke	-	-	-	12 February 2016	Bonus episode with Alex Haddow from the-pool.com
053	Unsolicited Dick Pics	The Joy Of Text	The Tale Of Tsar Saltan	–	–	2016-02-16	–
054	Death By Orange Soda	Paul is dead	Denver International Airport	–	–	2016-02-19	Bonus episode with Alex Haddow from the-pool.com
055	Some Indecent Proposals	List of scandals with "-gate" suffix	Thousand-yard stare	–	–	2016-02-23	–
056	AKA Buster	U2charist	Gatsby (sandwich)	Sunday Sport	No Scrubs	2016-03-01	–
057	Box Hunt with Des O' Connor	Lisa Niles	Pole Chudes	–	–	2016-03-08	–
058	Chubby Little Despots	Kaspar Hauser	Superman curse	–	–	2016-03-12	Bonus episode with Owen Hughes from failedcritics.com
059	Thinky Box Brain House	Intracortical encephalogram signal analysis	Blue Peter pets	–	–	2016-03-15	–
060	Work on Bank for 1 Money	The Terror	The Samsonadzes	Phubbing	–	2016-03-18	Bonus episode with Owen Hughes from failedcritics.com
061	Poor Little Eoghan Quigg	Zayn Malik	MegaChip	–	–	2016-03-22	–
062	One of the Least Sexy Cancers	Buffalo buffalo Buffalo buffalo buffalo buffalo Buffalo buffalo	A Horse for Mandy	–	–	2016-03-29	2016-03
063	The Three Seashells	Cryonics	–	–	–	2016-04-05	–
064	Cricket With Gary Barlow	Living statue	Maybe We Should Just Sleep on It	–	–	2016-04-12	One year anniversary
065	Guinea Pig Shaving	Stanley Green	–	–	–	2016-04-15	Bonus episode with Keith Clark
066	Iustus id Somnus	Polo neck	Seasteading	–	–	2016-04-19	–
067	Wax Lacks Whack Slacks	List of animals with fraudulent diplomas	Heroes of Wrestling	Grunge speak	–	2016-04-25	Bonus episode with Keith Clark
068	Lifehack Your Lagging	Pool noodle	Disconnection	–	–	2016-04-26	–
069	The Gems of Azamore	The Mystery at Lilac Inn	Ghettopoly	Colin the Caterpillar	–	2016-05-03	–
070	Floaty Sex Dirt	Nepenthes jamban	H. L. Hunt	-	-	2016-05-10	–
071	Vadge Bishop	Masturbate-a-thon				2016-05-13	Bonus episode with Stacey Taylor from Stacey's Pop Culture Parlour
