= Seasons in Black =

German metal band

- Origin: Neukirchen beim Heiligen Blut, Germany
- Genres: Death metal; black metal; gothic metal
- Years active: 1996–present
- Labels: Black Attakk Records; Apostasy Records
- Members: Ludwig Maurer "Lucki"; Leon Hanff; Roman Adam "Rome"; Markus Neumeier "Maxx"; Harald Hemauer "Hemi"
- Past members: See below

Seasons in Black is a German metal band from Neukirchen beim Heiligen Blut.

== History ==
Seasons in Black was founded in 1996 as a black/death metal band. None of the original lineup remains. However, with singer Ludwig "Lucki" Maurer, guitarist Roman Adam, keyboardist Markus Neumeier, and drummer Harald Hemauer, a stable lineup has existed for over 15 years, and has played on all three of the band's albums. In 2021, Leon Hanff joined as lead guitarist. The band name comes from "Seasons of Black," a song from End of Green's debut album, Infinity.

In 2005, their debut album, Deadtime Stories, was released on the independent label Black Attakk. The album was clearly oriented towards gothic metal.

In 2013, the self-produced album, The Swansong Diearies, was released. The album was again more oriented towards death/black metal. After the album, Adam and Maurer went independent, forcing Seasons in Black to take several hiatuses. It was only during the COVID-19 pandemic that the band reunited and worked on new material.

The band's third album, Athropocene, was released on 4 July 2025, via the Apostasy Records label. With this album, Seasons in Black reached the German charts for the first time. Guest vocalists on the album include Michael Rhein (In Extremo), Michelle Darkness (End of Green), and Hannes Ringlstetter. The album also includes a cover of "Inside" by the Scottish band Stiltskin. That same year, the band played at both Summer Breeze, where Maurer was responsible for catering, and Wacken Open Air.

== Musical style ==
After initial attempts at death and black metal, Seasons in Black developed their own blend of different musical styles, which they dubbed "doomcore." However, it has nothing to do with the original term for punk-heavy doom metal. Rather, the band's style is a blend of gothic metal, hardcore punk, and groove metal.

== Members ==
Current

- Ludwig Maurer "Luck" – vocals, bass (1997–present)
- Leon Hanff – lead guitar (2021–present)
- Roman Adam "Rome" – guitar (1997–present)
- Markus Neumeier "Maxx" – keyboards, vocals (2004–present)
- Harald Hemauer "Hemi" – drums (2005–present)

Former

- Dani Begerl "Nothing" – drums (?–2005)
- Wast – guitar (?)
- Manuel Körner "Korn" – guitar (?)
- Willi – bass (1996–1997)
- Lars Oehme – drums (1996–2000)
- Andy – drums (1996–1997)
- Katrin Löffler – vocals (1999–2000)
- Otto Aschenbrenner – drums (2000)
- Roman – guitar (2000–2001)
- Jim – keyboards (2000–2001)
- Martin – keyboards (2000)
- Christian Brosch "The Fifth" – guitar (2004–2006)

== Discography ==
=== Studio albums ===
List of studio albums, with selected details
Title	Album details	Peak chart positions
Title	Album details	GER
Deadtime Stories	Released: 25 November 2005; Label: Black Attakk; Formats: CD, digital download, streaming	—
The Swansong Diearies	Released: 23 November 2013; Label: Self-released; Formats: CD, digital download, streaming	—
Anthropocene	Released: 4 July 2025; Label: Apostasy Records; Formats: CD, digital download, streaming	35

=== Split albums ===
List of split albums
Title	EP details
Blütenphantasie / Seeker	Released: 2002; Label: Self-released
