= As Long as We Both Shall Live =

2003 novel by Lurlene McDaniel

As Long As We Both Shall Live: Two Novels
- Author: Lurlene McDaniel
- Language: English
- Genre: Young adult romance
- Published: October 2003 Laurel Leaf
- Publication place: United States
- Media type: Paperback
- Pages: 416

As Long as We Both Shall Live: Two Novels is a young adult book by Lurlene McDaniel, published in October 2003. It consists of two previously published novels, Till Death Do Us Part and For Better, For Worse, Forever.

== Characters ==
- April Lancaster is an 18-year-old whose life has changed drastically due to her ill health.
- Mark Gianni is a 22-year-old who never lets anything get in the way of his goal to become a race car driver, despite having lived with cystic fibrosis his whole life.
- Brandon Benedict is a bitter, eccentric graduate student.

== See also ==
- Till Death Do Us Part
- For Better, For Worse, Forever
