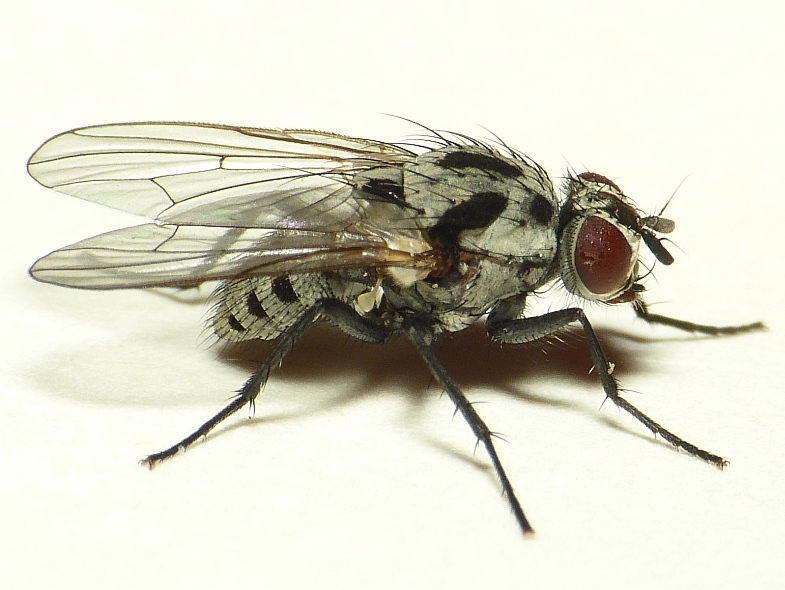
- Anthomyia procellaris. Female

Scientific classification
- Kingdom: Animalia
- Phylum: Arthropoda
- Clade: Pancrustacea
- Class: Insecta
- Order: Diptera
- Family: Anthomyiidae
- Genus: Anthomyia
- Species: A. procellaris

Binomial name
- Anthomyia procellaris Rondani, 1866

= Anthomyia procellaris =

Species of fly

Anthomyia procellaris is a species of fly in the family Anthomyiidae.

== Distribution ==
This species is present in Europe, the East Palearctic realm (China and Japan), the Near East, and the Nearctic realm (Michigan south to North Carolina).

== Description ==
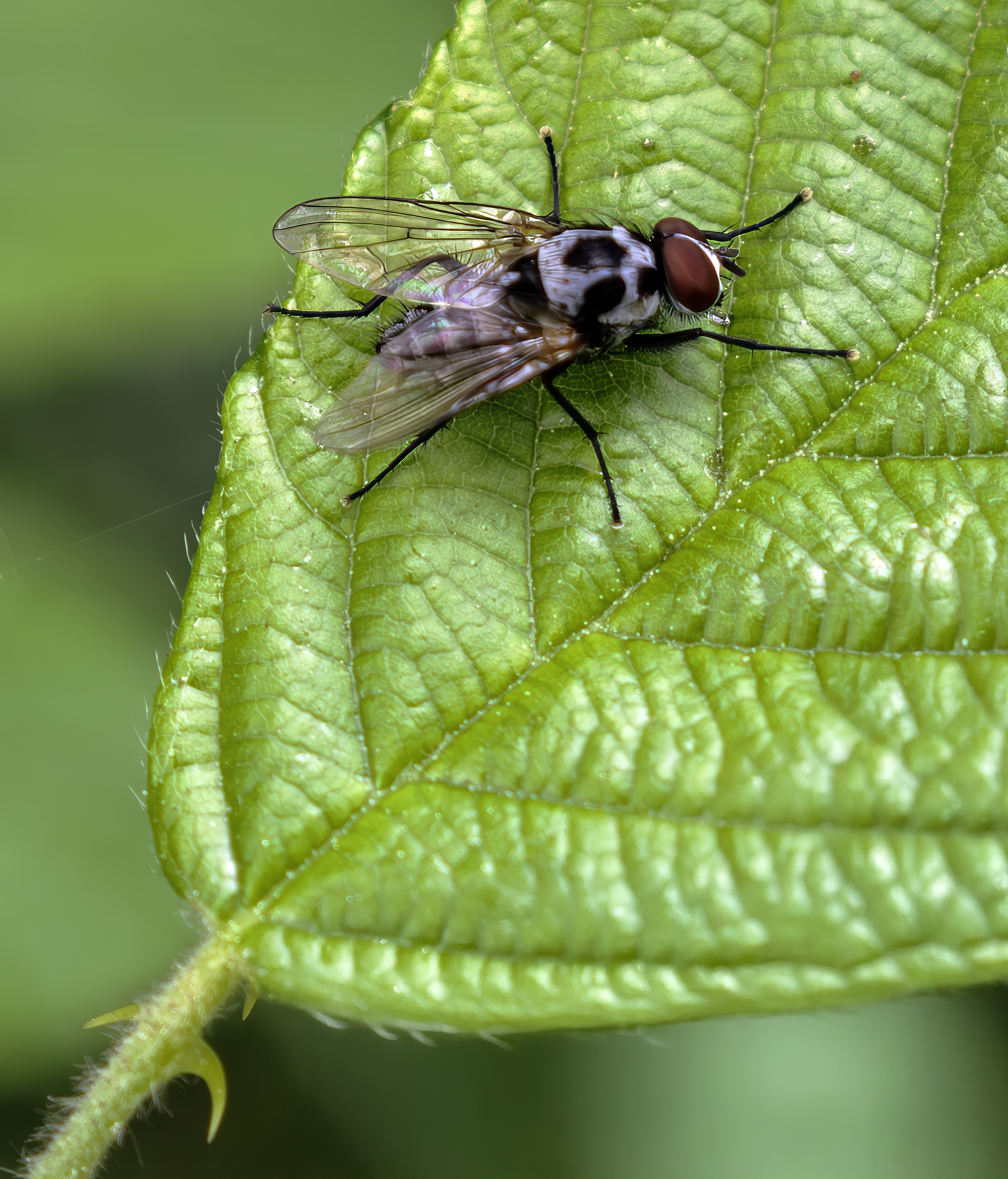
Male of Anthomyia procellaris, dorsal view on Rubus caesius

Anthomyia procellaris can reach a length of 5–7 millimetres (0.20–0.28 in). These small flies show velvety black on greyish markings, with three black spots on the center of the thorax. The eyes are bare and the proboscis is robust. The abdomen is mainly greyish.

This species is very similar to Anthomyia imbrida and Anthomyia pluvialis and it is a quite difficult species to identify correctly. However, in Anthomyia procellaris the black marking just at the base of the wings is not divided into two separate areas and ends in a straight rear boundary. Moreover, in males the anterodorsal hairs on the hind tibia are less than 9.

== Habitat and biology ==
These flies prefer wooded habitats and hedge rows. They fly from Spring to autumn and love sun bathing. They feed on nectar, pollen and excrements. Larvae are associated with bird's nests and feed on bird droppings.
