= Afghan High Peace Council =

Organization

- Dari: رئیس شورای عالی صلح افغانستان

Agency overview
- Formed: September 5, 2010
- Dissolved: 2019
- Jurisdiction: Afghanistan
- Status: Dissolved

The Afghanistan High Peace Council (HPC) (Dari: شورای عالی صلح افغانستان) was a body of the Afghanistan Peace and Reintegration Program, established by Hamid Karzai to negotiate with elements of the Taliban. The HPC was established on 5 September 2010. The last chairman of the council was former Afghan Vice-President Karim Khalili who was appointed to the post in June 2017. The council was initially chaired by former President of Afghanistan Burhanuddin Rabbani until his assassination in 2011. In mid-April 2012, Burhanuddin Rabbani's son Salahuddin Rabbani was appointed chairman of the council. He held the position until 2015. The Council was dissolved in 2019 by Ashraf Ghani. Its members were appointed to the State Ministry of Peace Affairs, a new government body focused on peace process.

In September 2011 Haji Deen Muhammed expressed outrage over the killing of Sabar Lal Melma. Sabar had been apprehended and sent to Guantanamo in 2002, based on allegations he helped facilitate Osama bin Laden's escape from Afghanistan. He was repatriated in 2007. But American special forces kept taking him captive. According to Deen Muhammed the Peace Council had secured assurance that Americans would stop harassing Sabar. Nevertheless, Sabar was killed by US special forces, in his home, during a night raid, just two days after the Peace Council received assurances that harassment of him would stop.

== Members ==
Originally formed in 2010, the council consisted of seventy-four members, who were expected negotiate with the Taliban. The membership of the peace council also included some former members of the Taliban.

| # | Name | Role | Alliance | Reference(s) |
|---|---|---|---|---|
| 1 | Arsala Rahmani Daulat | Member | Khuddamul Furqan | |
| 2 | Habibullah Fawzi | Member | Taliban | |
| 3 | Sayeedur Rahman Haqani | Member | Taliban | |
| 4 | Ahmed Gailani | Deputy chairperson | National Islamic Front of Afghanistan | |
| 5 | Abdul Rasul Sayyaf | Member | Islamic Dawah Organisation of Afghanistan | |
| 6 | Ismael Qasemyar | Member | Government of Afghanistan | |
| 7 | Burhanuddin Rabbani | Chairman | Jamiat-e Islami | |
| 8 | Karim Khalili | Member | Hezb-e Wahdat Islami Afghanistan | |
