= Sufism in Afghanistan =

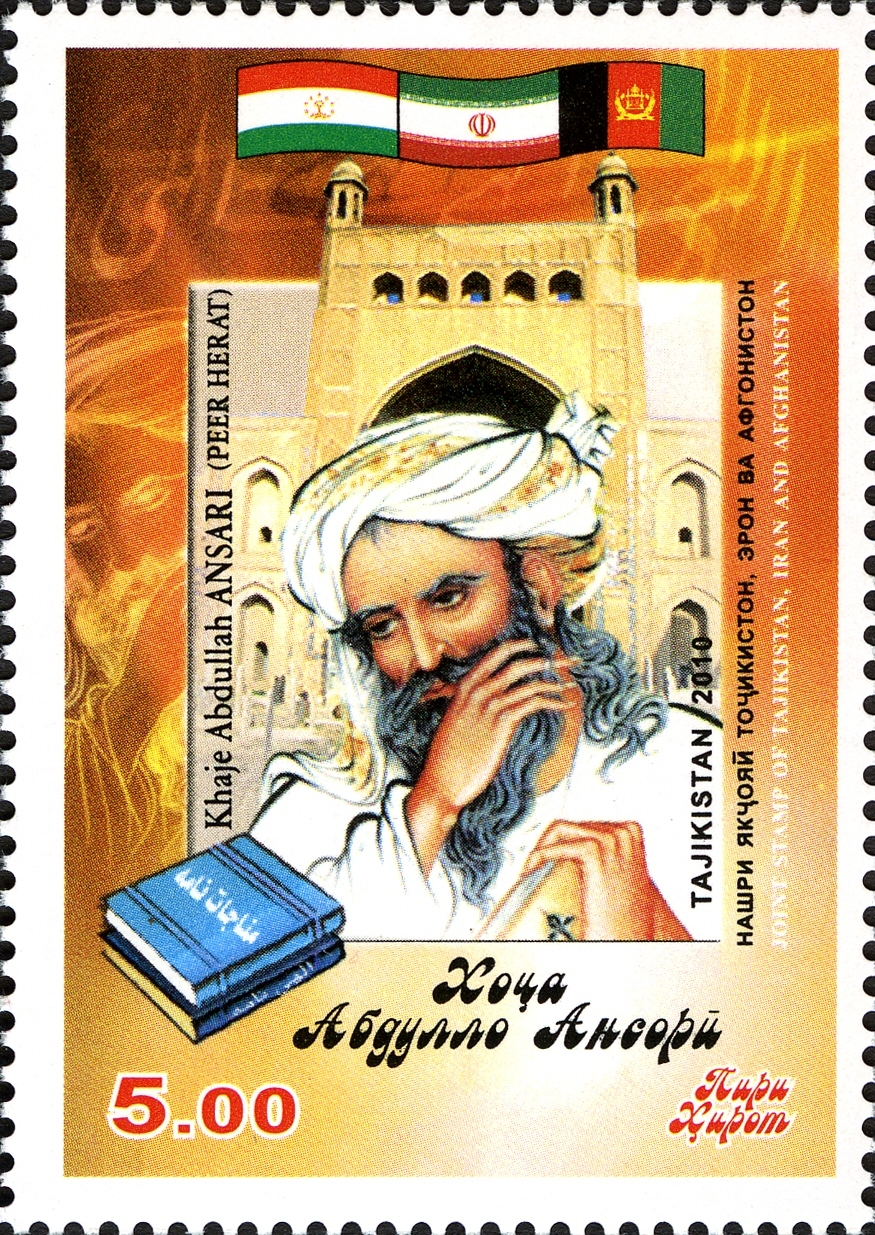
Khwaja Abdullah Ansari portrayed on a Tajik stamp

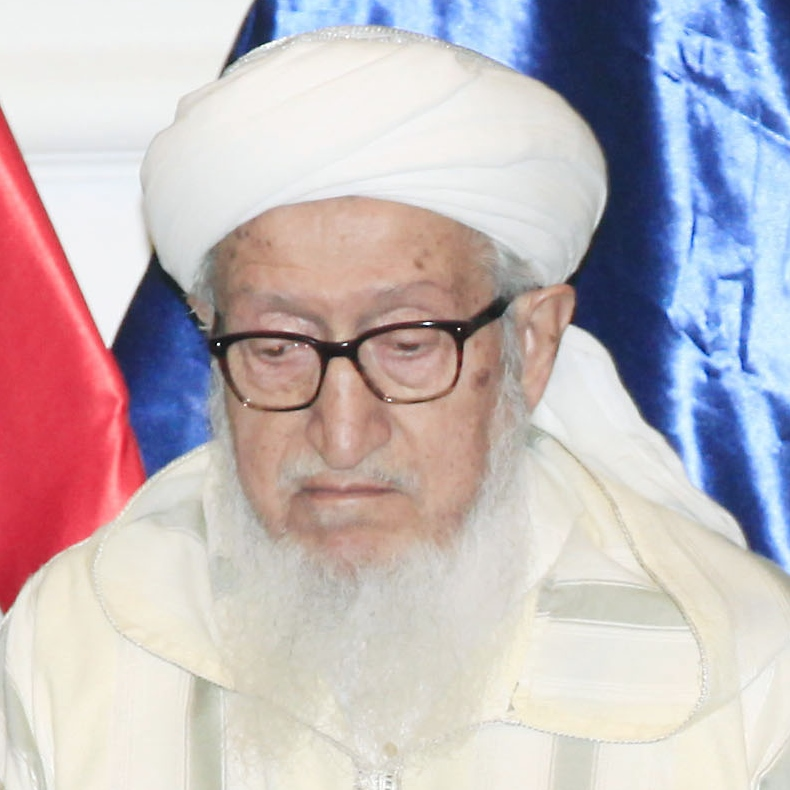
Sibghatullah Mojaddedi in 2014

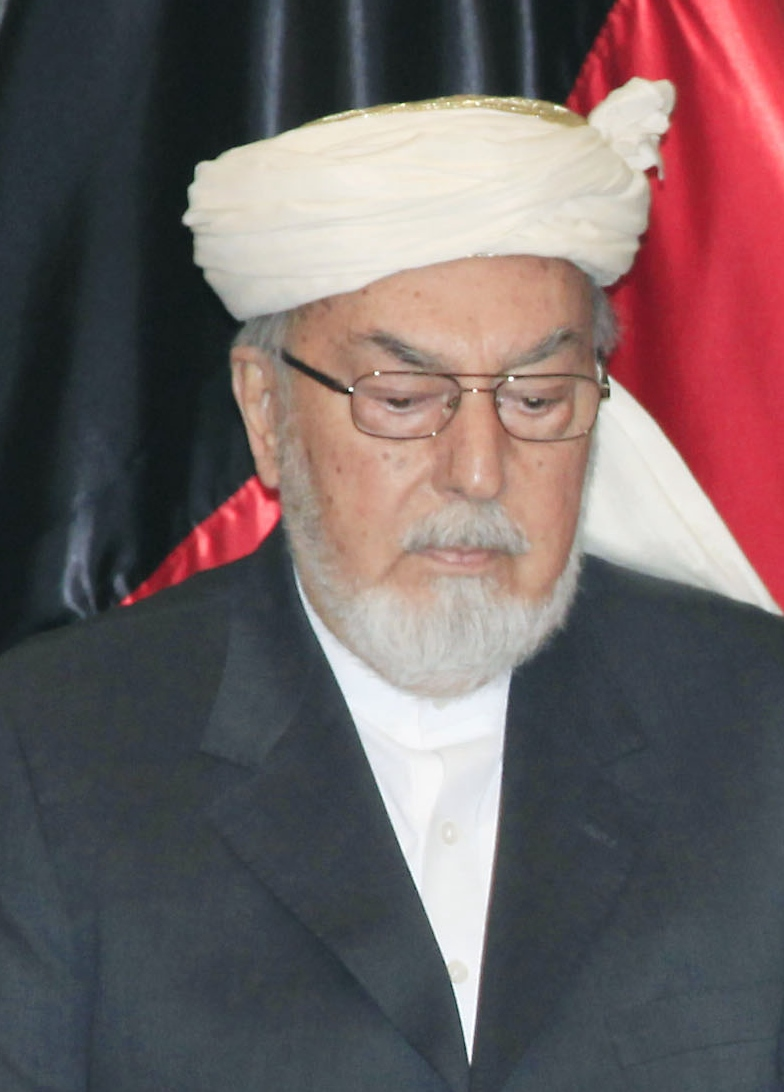
Ahmed Gailani in 2014

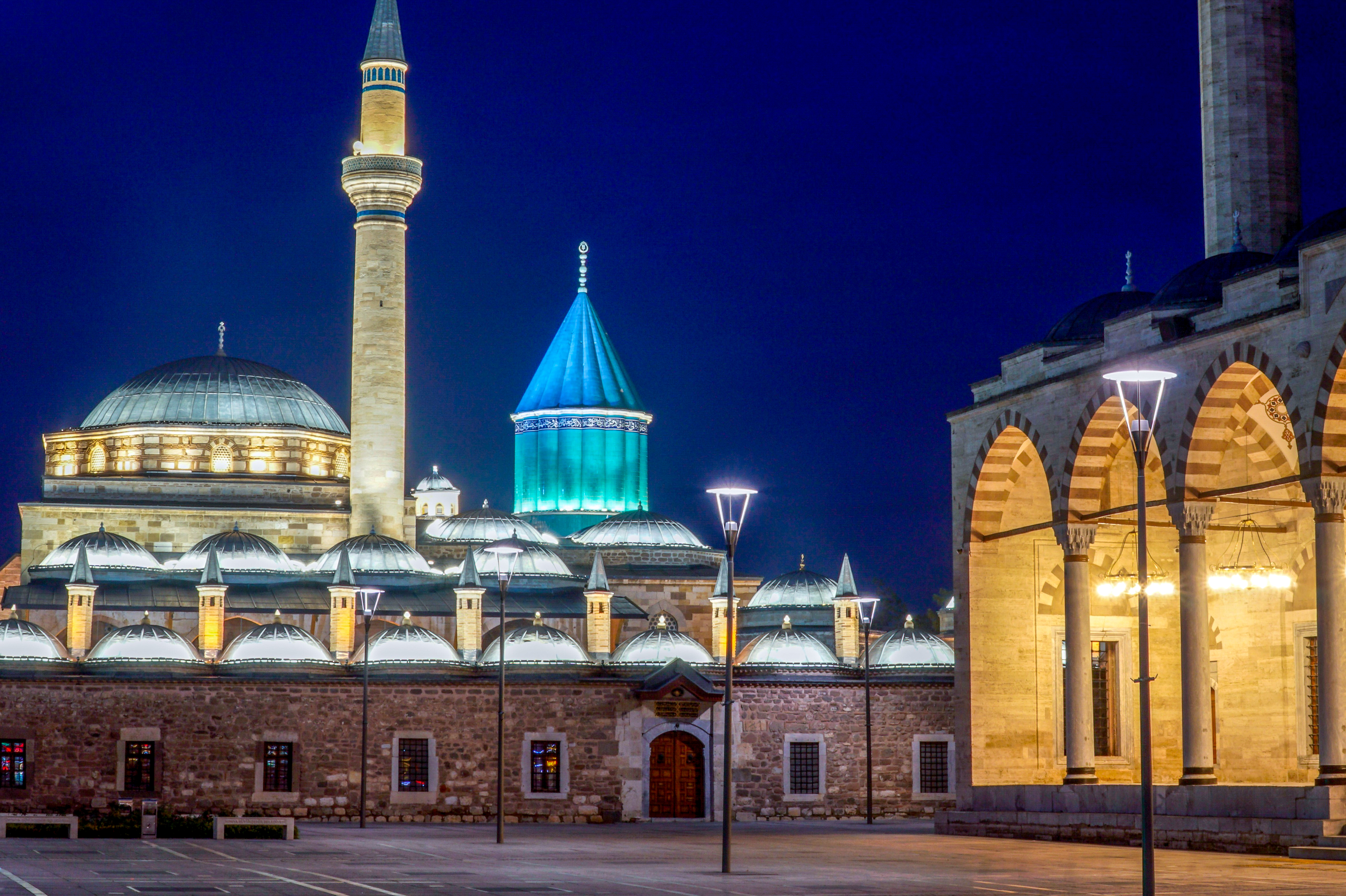
Tomb shrine of Rumi, Konya

Sufism is considered an important aspect of Islam in Afghanistan. Most people are not followers of Sufism but Sufis have had a considerable influence on both urban and rural society. Sufism has been part of the country for as long as 1300 years, so Afghanistan is recognised as the "Home of Sufi Saints". Sufism was suppressed by the Taliban when they governed from 1996 to 2001, after which it was regaining its importance prior to the return of the Taliban to power.

Sufism has shaped Afghan society and politics for much of the country's history. Today, very few are aware of this legacy. Might the Sufis now provide an important contribution to the stability of the country?

— Marian Brehmer, 2015

== Influence ==
Sufism is tightly bound to the history of Afghanistan, as Afghan kings were traditionally crowned in the presence of a great Sufi master. The Sufis were also involved in revolts against many political rulers. In 1919, under King Amanullah, the Sufis felt their position in society under threat. Many Sufi and non-Sufi Muslims united to overthrow King Amanullah.

== Sufi rituals and practices ==
Qawwali, a devotional Sufi music, is sung over the country. Other Sufi practices include zikr, construction of various Khanqahs to spread Islam. The Naqshbandi tariqa is one of the most dominant Sufi orders in Afghanistan. The Mujaddidiya branch of the Naqshbandi tariqa is said to influential to the present day. Pir Saifur Rahman was one of the notable Sufi of this order. The other affiliates of the Naqshbandi order are Ansari, Dahbidi, Parsai, Juybari. The other Sufi orders followed in Afghanistan are Qadriyya and Chishti Order.

Mawlid is celebrated by Sufis in Afghanistan. The various belongings of Muhammad such as Moo-e-Mubarak (Muhammad's hair) and Khirka-e-Sharif (Muhammad's cardigan) are sacred things for Sufis in Afghanistan, and they have built shrines around the belongings.

Sufis in Afghanistan are positively associated with the spiritual power of karamat. Pilgrimages to Sufi shrines (Ziyarat) take place across Afghanistan.

=== Beliefs ===
People in Afghanistan regard Sufi shrines as places to unburden themselves, sharing their problems at the feet of Sufi saints, believing the saint can intercede on their behalf. It is a firm belief that prayer by a Sufi saint can eliminate poverty, cure illnesses, improve relations with loved ones and ease from various ills of life. When people become helpless after using all the possibilities in their hands, then they refer to Sufi saints. Sufi saints are considered as the representatives of Allah who can build their relationship with Allah and all their desires - through the saint - can be directly heard and fulfilled by Allah.

== Repression of Sufi practices in Afghanistan ==
Sufism suffered during the Taliban rule of Afghanistan from 1996 to 2001. The movement was "hostile to Sufism as well as the veneration of saints and shrines" (the latter are important practices of Sufism, as well as popular customs across Afghanistan). It is said that many Sufis were tortured by the Taliban, and their musical instruments were destroyed. This led Sufis to remain underground for many years. However, a number of Taliban figureheads maintained individual and familial connections to Sufis. Some analysts, including Anand Gopal and Annika Schmeding, have argued that Sufism originally influenced the Taliban both through village traditions and Deobandi scholarship, despite its aggressive attitude towards Sufi practices and overly "innovative" forms of Sufism.

On 15 March 2012, 11 Afghan Sufis were killed. In 2018, around 50 religious scholars were the victim of suicide bombing during the Mawlid celebration in Afghanistan.

After the Taliban returned to power in 2021, all Sufi lodges and foundations across the country were shut down. The government claimed this was because of a risk of terrorist attacks. In 2024, the Taliban outlawed the broadcasting of Sufi-related content in Afghan media, prompting criticism from a number of clerics and academics.

== List of notable Afghan Sufis ==
Former president of Afghanistan Sibghatullah Mojaddedi was a Sufi Shaikh.

Other Sufis born in present-day Afghanistan include the following:

- Hakim Sanai (Ghazni)
- Jami (Herat)
- Sheikh Mohammad Rohani
- Khwaja Abdullah Ansari
- Ahmed Gailani
- Abobaker Mojadidi
- Rumi
