= Habibullah Fawzi =

Afghan diplomat

Member of the Afghanistan High Peace Council

Personal details
- Citizenship: Afghanistan
- Party: Taliban

Habibullah Fawzi is a citizen of Afghanistan, who was a senior diplomat during the Taliban's administration of Afghanistan, and was appointed to the Afghanistan High Peace Council in September 2010. Fawzi had served as the Charge D'Affairs at the Taliban's embassy in Saudi Arabia.

On 7 January 2002, Newsday described Habibullah as one of the senior Taliban leaders who had defected, went into exile in Pakistan, and were seeking a peaceful role in Afghanistan's politics. The defectors revived a defunct political party, Jamiat Khudamul Furgan, translated as "Association of the servants of the Quran".

In 2005 Habibullah, and three other former Taliban leaders described as moderates, Abdul Hakim Mujahid, Arsullah Rahmani and Rahmatullah Wahidyar met with officials of the Hamid Karzai administration to discuss the possible surrender of active Taliban fighters. Radio Free Europe interviewed Habibullah in March 2005. In an interview published on 4 March 2005 Radio Free Europe, Habibullah said that the moderates had been in talks with the Karzai administration for the previous two years.

Habibullah, and the other three men had been named on the United Nations 1267 list, a list of several hundred individuals upon whom member nations were to impose financial sanctions because they were suspected of playing a role in international terrorism. The list was first published in 1999. The United Nations removed Habibullah and the other three men in July 2011.

In September 2011 Habibullah was one of the former Taliban officials who offered details as to how a Taliban messenger had assassinated Burnahuddin Rabbani, the former President of Afghanistan who chaired the High Peace Council.

“...wearing Afghan style clothes – shalwar kamez and turban – came from Quetta to Kabul with a message of peace from the Taliban. He met Rabbani and Stanekzai. Rabbani was expecting him. He was supposed to be a key member of the Taliban. They discussed peace and after the meeting was over Rabbani stood up to wish this man goodbye. Rabbani and the Talib hugged and that was when he blew himself up.”
