= Anthomyia ochripes =

Scientific classification
- Kingdom: Animalia
- Phylum: Arthropoda
- Class: Insecta
- Order: Diptera
- Family: Anthomyiidae
- Subfamily: Anthomyiinae
- Tribe: Anthomyiini
- Genus: Anthomyia
- Species: A. ochripes

Binomial name
- Anthomyia ochripes (Linnaeus, 1758)

Species of fly

Anthomyia ochripes is a species of root-maggot fly in the family Anthomyiidae.
