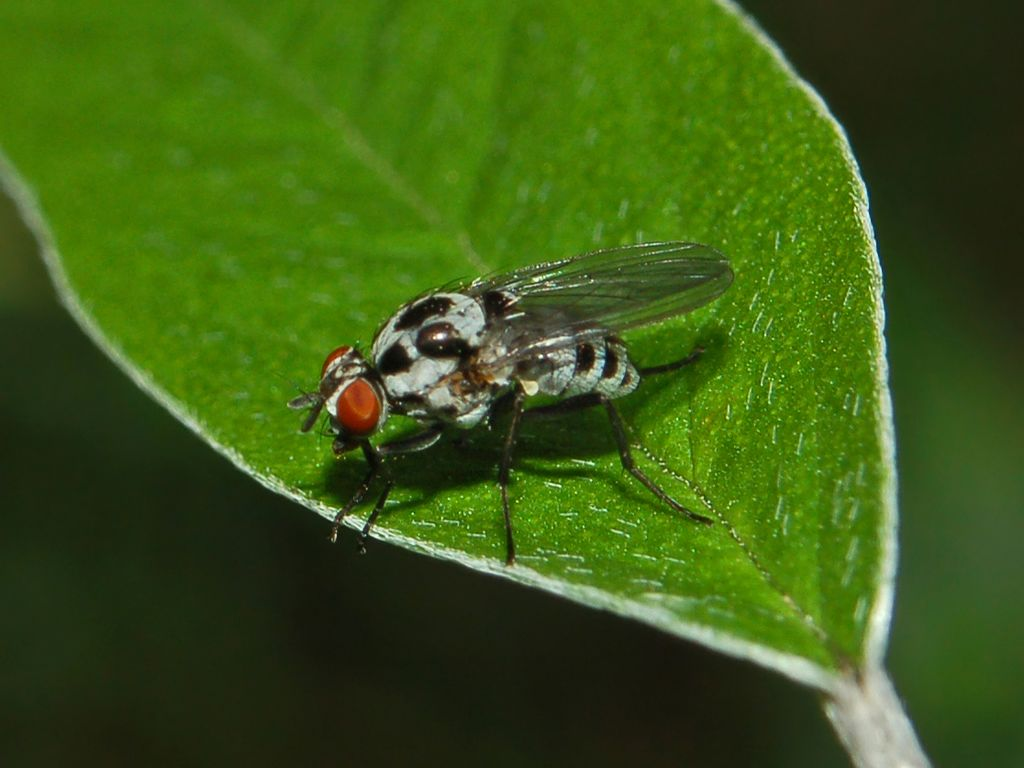
- Anthomyia cf. quinquemaculata, female

Scientific classification
- Kingdom: Animalia
- Phylum: Arthropoda
- Class: Insecta
- Order: Diptera
- Family: Anthomyiidae
- Genus: Anthomyia
- Species: A. quinquemaculata

Binomial name
- Anthomyia quinquemaculata Macquart, 1839

= Anthomyia quinquemaculata =

Species of fly

Anthomyia quinquemaculata is a species of anthomyiid fly belonging to the family Anthomyiidae.

This species is mainly present in Czech Republic, France, Italy, Greece, Spain, Portugal, in the Near East and in North Africa.

It has five distinct black spots on the thorax. The black spot at the base of the wing is in continuity with the dorsal-lateral one. Scutellum is gray only at the apex. Tibial setae are short, seta in the middle of the tibia 2 is as long as the diameter of the tibia itself. In the female the eyes are well spaced.
