= Sayeedur Rahman Haqani =

Member of the Afghanistan High Peace Council

Personal details
- Citizenship: Afghanistan
- Party: Taliban

Maulavi Sayeedur Rahman Haqani (Pashto: سعيدالرحمن حقاني, romanized: Sa’īd-ur-Rahmān Haqqānī) was a senior member of the Taliban leadership.

The United Nations Security Council issued Security Council Resolution 1267 in 1999, which listed senior Taliban members. The United Nations requested member states to freeze the financial assets of those individuals.

Sayeedur Rahman Haqani was listed as one of the Taliban's Deputy Minister of Mines and Industries.

In September 2010 Hamid Karzai named him as one of the seventy members of the Afghanistan High Peace Council. The Peace Council's mandate was to open negotiations with moderate elements of the Taliban, and convince them to abandon violence and instead participate peacefully in the political process.

On July 16, 2011 the United Nations Security Council dropped his name, and that of thirteen other former members of the Taliban, from the 1267 list.
