= Anthomyia mimetica =

Scientific classification
- Domain: Eukaryota
- Kingdom: Animalia
- Phylum: Arthropoda
- Class: Insecta
- Order: Diptera
- Family: Anthomyiidae
- Subfamily: Anthomyiinae
- Tribe: Anthomyiini
- Genus: Anthomyia
- Species: A. mimetica

Binomial name
- Anthomyia mimetica (Malloch, 1918)

Synonyms
- Hylemyia karli Ringdahl, 1929; Hylemyia mimetica Malloch, 1918

Species of fly

Anthomyia mimetica is a species of root-maggot fly in the family Anthomyiidae. It is found in Europe.
