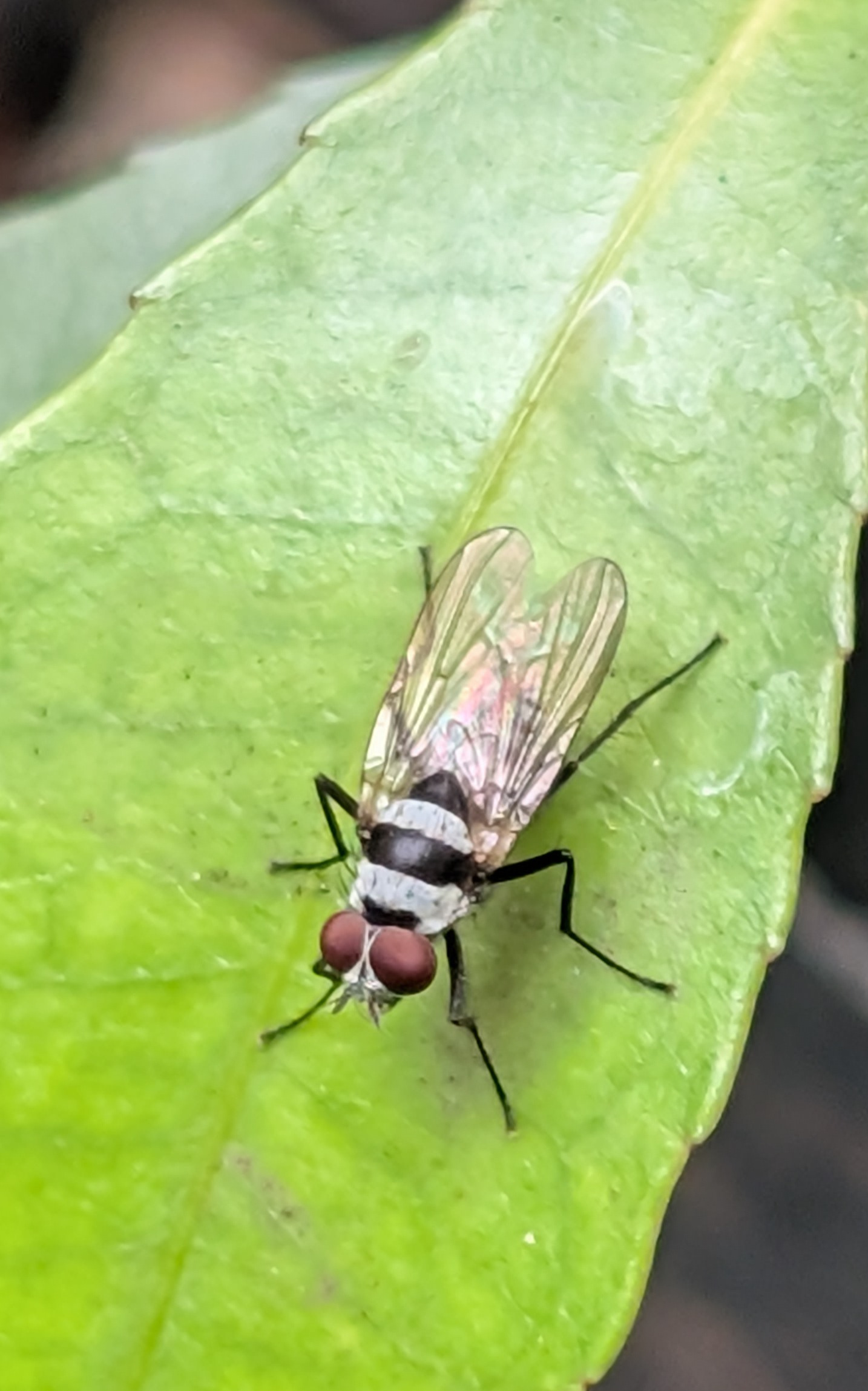

Scientific classification
- Domain: Eukaryota
- Kingdom: Animalia
- Phylum: Arthropoda
- Class: Insecta
- Order: Diptera
- Family: Anthomyiidae
- Subfamily: Anthomyiinae
- Tribe: Anthomyiini
- Genus: Anthomyia
- Species: A. medialis

Binomial name
- Anthomyia medialis Colless 1982

= Anthomyia medialis =

Species of fly

Anthomyia medialis is a species of fly in the family Anthomyiidae, found in eastern Australia.
