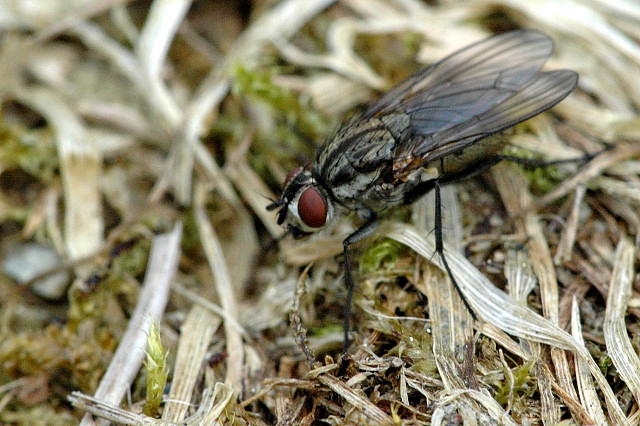
- Anthomyia monilis

Scientific classification
- Kingdom: Animalia
- Phylum: Arthropoda
- Clade: Pancrustacea
- Class: Insecta
- Order: Diptera
- Family: Anthomyiidae
- Subfamily: Anthomyiinae
- Tribe: Anthomyiini
- Genus: Anthomyia
- Species: A. monilis

Binomial name
- Anthomyia monilis (Meigen, 1826)

Synonyms
- Coenosia monilis Meigen, 1826

= Anthomyia monilis =

Species of fly

Anthomyia monilis is a species of fly in the family Anthomyiidae. It is found in the Palearctic. It was described by Johann Wilhelm Meigen in 1826.
