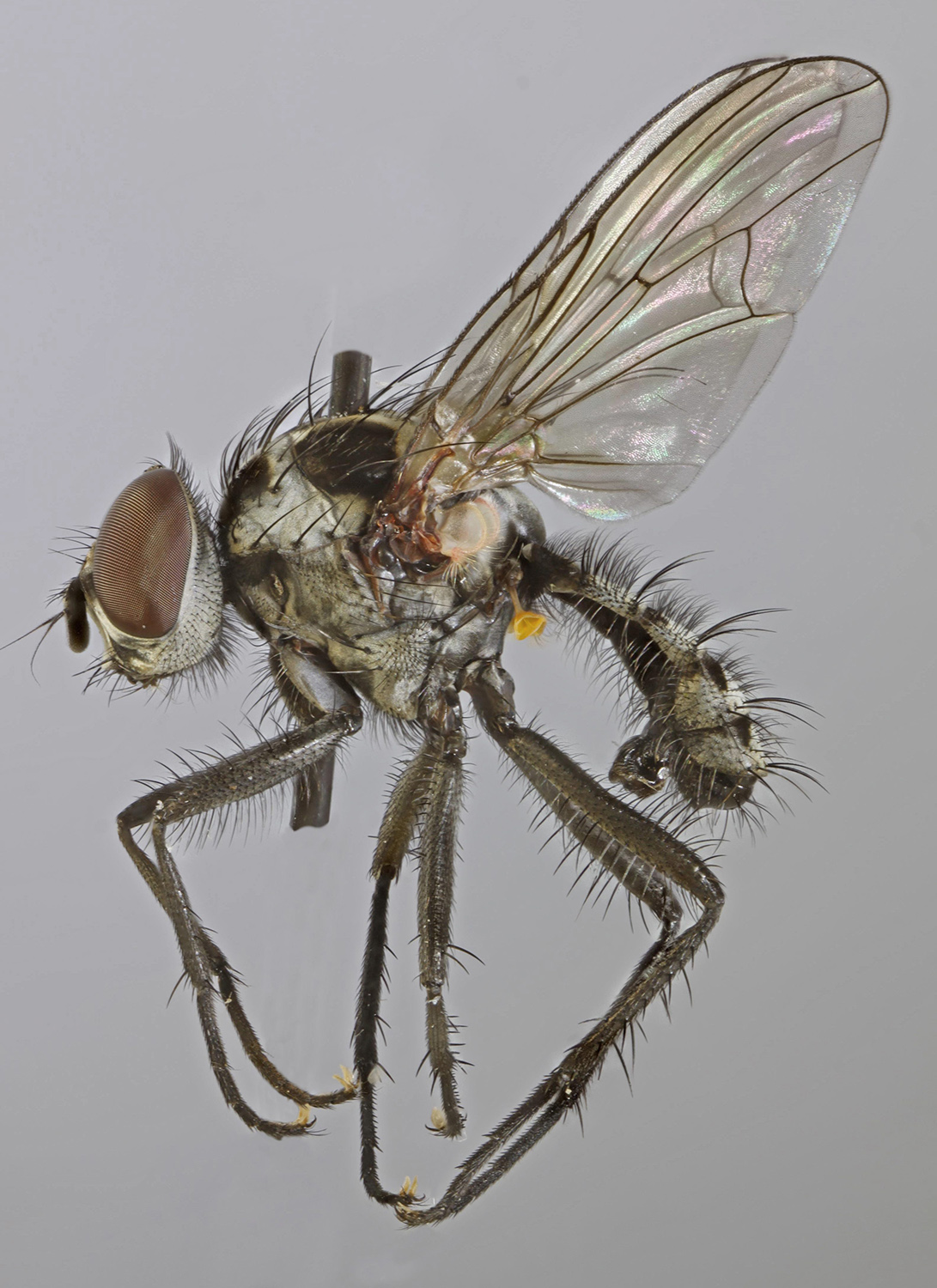
- Anthomyia bazini North Wales.

Scientific classification
- Kingdom: Animalia
- Phylum: Arthropoda
- Class: Insecta
- Order: Diptera
- Family: Anthomyiidae
- Genus: Anthomyia
- Species: A. bazini

Binomial name
- Anthomyia bazini Seguy, 1929

= Anthomyia bazini =

Species of fly

Anthomyia bazini is a species of fly in the family Anthomyiidae. It is found in the Palearctic. For identification see:
