= Anthomyia cannabina =

Scientific classification
- Kingdom: Animalia
- Phylum: Arthropoda
- Class: Insecta
- Order: Diptera
- Family: Anthomyiidae
- Subfamily: Anthomyiinae
- Tribe: Anthomyiini
- Genus: Anthomyia
- Species: A. cannabina

Binomial name
- Anthomyia cannabina (Stein, 1916)

Synonyms
- Chortophila cannabina Stein, 1916

Species of fly

Anthomyia cannabina is a species of fly in the family Anthomyiidae. It is found in the Palearctic. Identification of Anthomyia cannabina is described in Bei-Bienko & Steyskal 1988.
