= Anthomyia obscuripennis =

Scientific classification
- Kingdom: Animalia
- Phylum: Arthropoda
- Clade: Pancrustacea
- Class: Insecta
- Order: Diptera
- Family: Anthomyiidae
- Genus: Anthomyia
- Species: A. obscuripennis

Binomial name
- Anthomyia obscuripennis (Bigot, 1886)

Synonyms
- Chelisia elegans Stein, 1920; Nemopoda obscuripennis Bigot, 1886

Species of fly

Anthomyia obscuripennis is a species of fly in the family Anthomyiidae. It is found in the United States.
