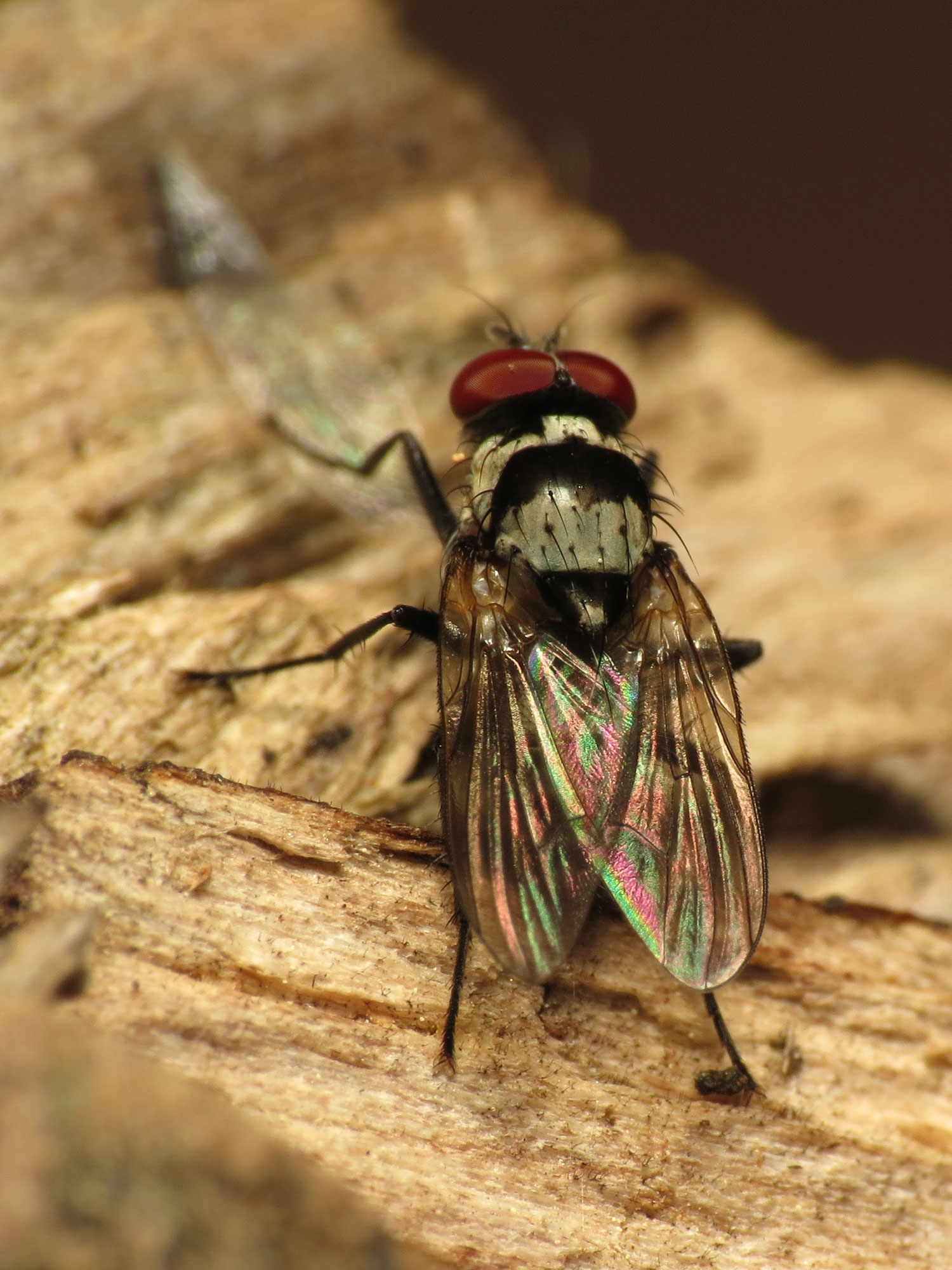

Scientific classification
- Domain: Eukaryota
- Kingdom: Animalia
- Phylum: Arthropoda
- Class: Insecta
- Order: Diptera
- Family: Anthomyiidae
- Subfamily: Anthomyiinae
- Tribe: Anthomyiini
- Genus: Anthomyia
- Species: A. oculifera

Binomial name
- Anthomyia oculifera Cagle, 1954

= Anthomyia oculifera =

Species of fly

Anthomyia oculifera is a species of root-maggot fly in the family Anthomyiidae.
