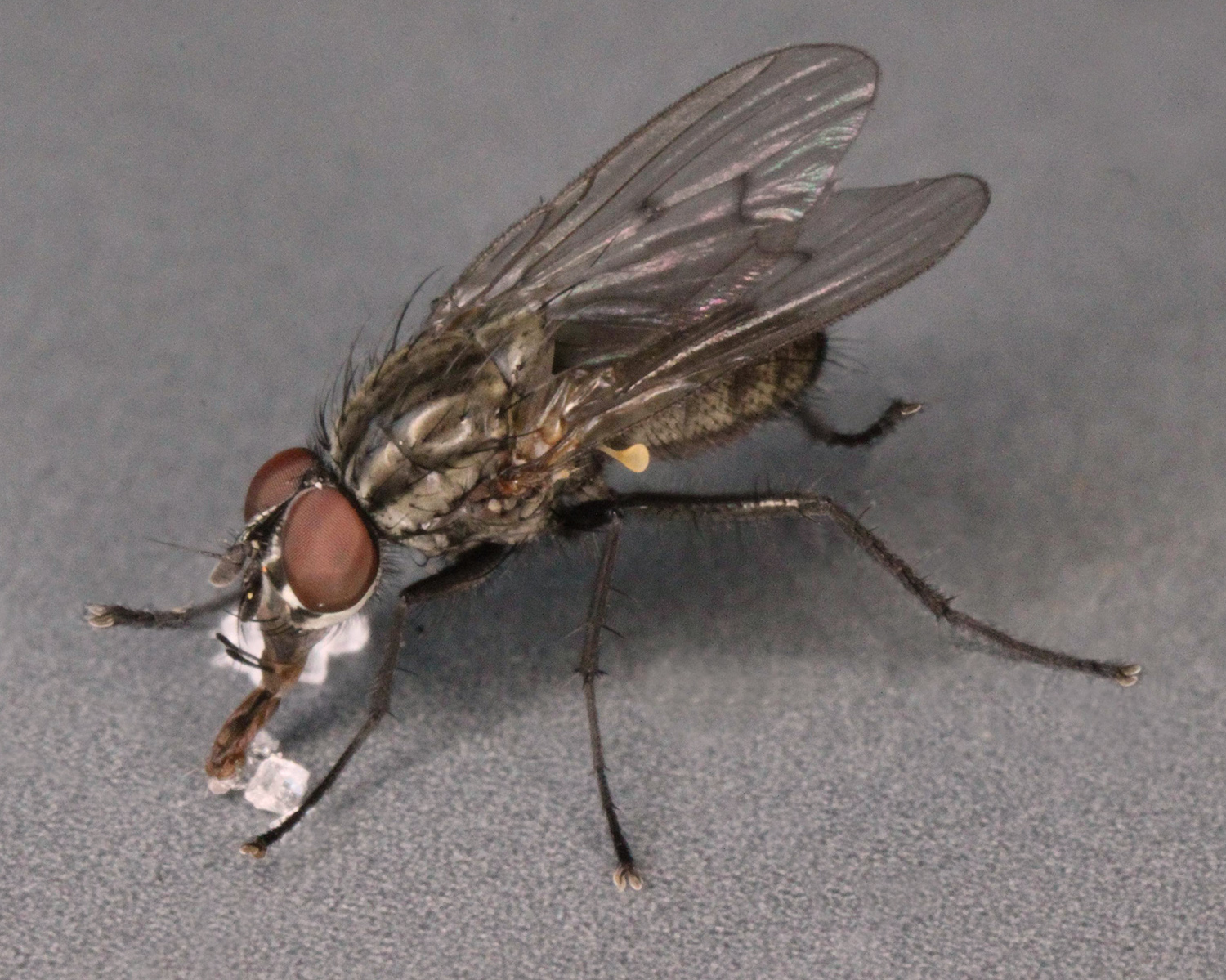
- Anthomyia confusanea North Wales

Scientific classification
- Domain: Eukaryota
- Kingdom: Animalia
- Phylum: Arthropoda
- Class: Insecta
- Order: Diptera
- Family: Anthomyiidae
- Genus: Anthomyia
- Species: A. confusanea

Binomial name
- Anthomyia confusanea Michelsen in Michelsen & Baez, 1985

= Anthomyia confusanea =

Species of fly

Anthomyia confusanea is a species of fly in the family Anthomyiidae. It is found in the Palearctic.
