= Afghan Threat Finance Cell =

Multi-agency intelligence organization in Afghanistan

The Afghan Threat Finance Cell was a multi-agency intelligence organization in Afghanistan. The organization was created in 2008. The United States' Drug Enforcement Administration was the lead agency in the organization. The co-deputy agencies were the United States Treasury and the United States Department of Defense. Other participating agencies included the Royal Canadian Mounted Police, the United States Federal Bureau of Investigation, the United States Department of Homeland Security, and the United States Internal Revenue Service.

== History ==
The Afghan Threat Finance Cell was set up at the initiative of General David Petraeus, when he was promoted to command of Central Command, based on the experience of the earlier Iraqi Threat Finance Cell that had reported to him when he was in command in Iraq.

In February 2011, Dexter Filkins, writing in The New Yorker, reported:

The Threat Finance Cell also has almost single-handedly demonstrated the degree to which the American-led war in Afghanistan is compromised by connections among the Taliban, drug traffickers, and Afghan officials.

The organization was instrumental in exposing corruption in the Kabul Bank, which came close to collapse in 2010.

In February 2012 the Afghan Threat Finance Cell was awarded the Department of Defense's Joint Meritorious Unit Award.

== Operations ==
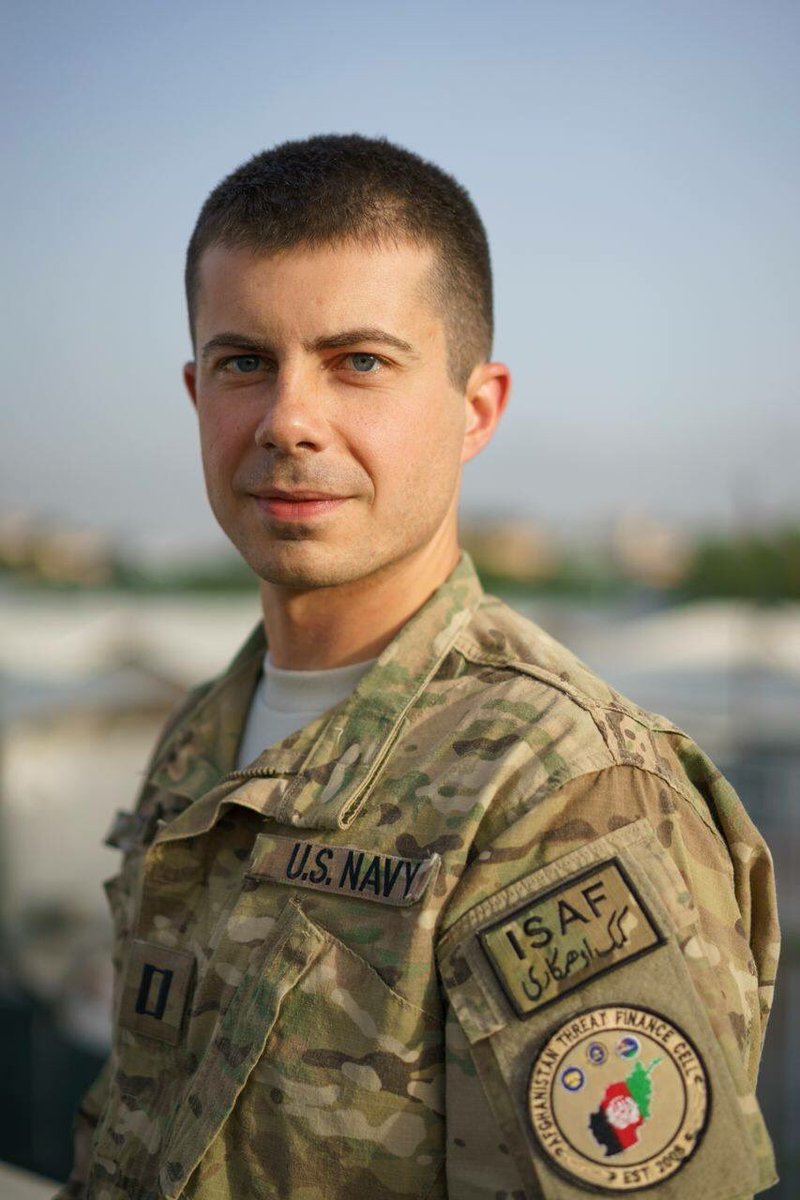
Pete Buttigieg in uniform in 2014 with the Afghan Threat Finance Cell patch

Tracking both illicit and legitimate financial transactions led to 27 approved targets to be named on the "Joint Prioritized Effects List". The Joint Prioritized Effects List is colloquially called the "kill or capture list". Once an individual is named on this list, special forces are authorized to covertly target and raid that individual's home or workplace.
