= Afghanistan night raids =

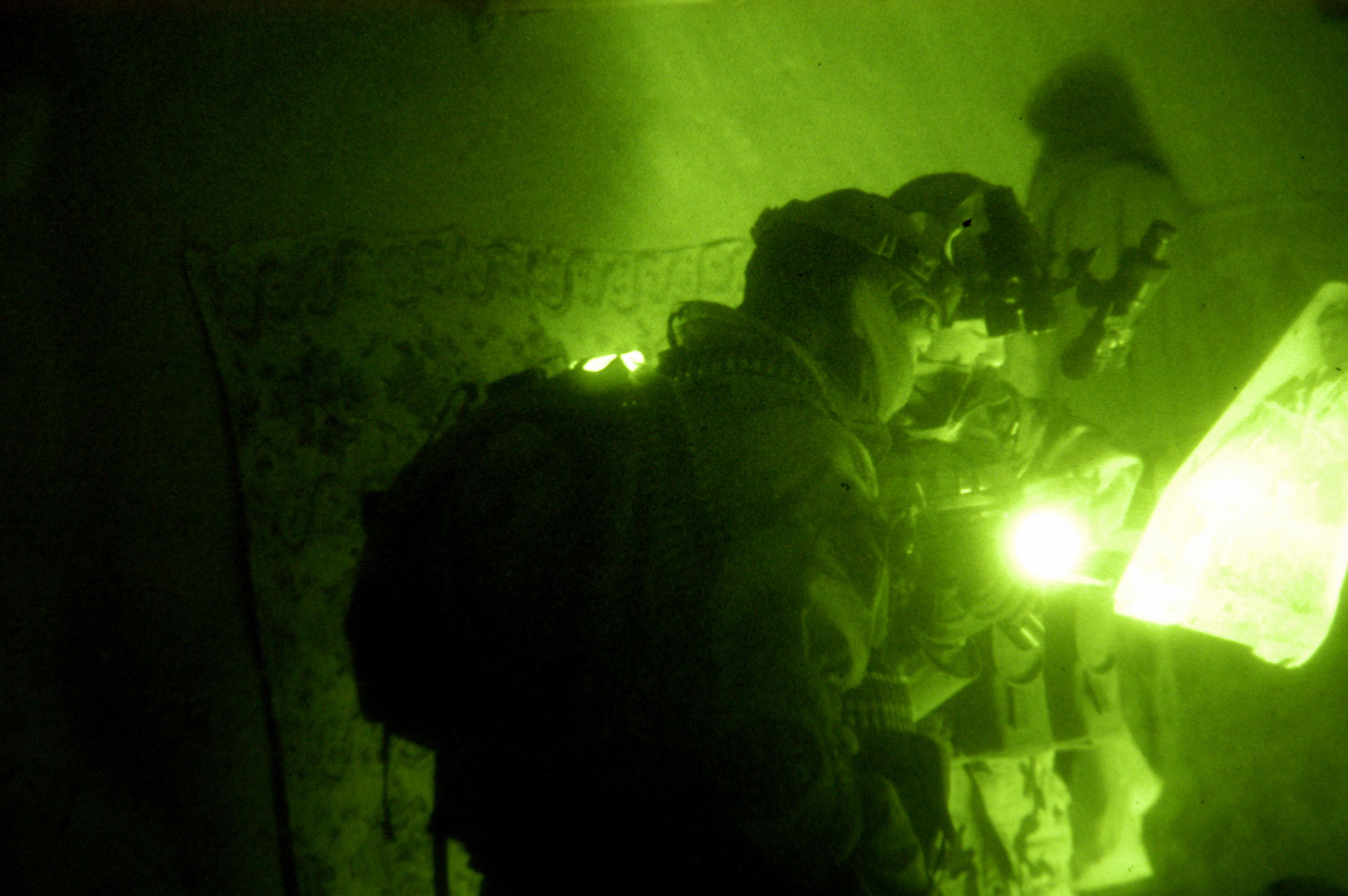
Afghan commandos during a night raid on a suspected insurgent safehouse, December 2007.

Night raids were a military tactic employed by United States and Afghan special forces during the War in Afghanistan. In these raids, units from U.S. Joint Special Operations Command worked alongside Afghan Commandos to leverage superior night vision capabilities to conduct capture-or-kill raids on the suspected households of targets on the Joint Prioritized Effects List compiled by coalition forces. The operations were sometimes controversial, particularly regarding civilian casualties and claims that because coalition human intelligence collectors paid for tips, the target set may have included individuals falsely accused by financially motivated tipsters.

The tactic was effectively discontinued as U.S. and coalition forces withdrew from Afghanistan in 2021.

== Controversy ==
American generals argued the raids were a "critical" part of achieving success in the war. Afghan president Hamid Karzai argued that they impinge upon Afghanistan's sovereignty and called for them to be halted.

Human rights workers were concerned that the raids killed a large number of civilians bystanders, who weren't on the list. In addition they were concerned that individuals ended up on the list due to weak circumstantial evidence, or false denunciations triggered by greed, or long-standing tribal rivalries.

Afghan journalist Anand Gopal described a night raid intended to capture an official of the Afghan Ministry of Agriculture who had been denounced. He wasn't home, but during the course of the raid two of his cousins who also lived in his family compound were killed, and a third cousin was seized and disappeared into US custody.

Hamid Karzai's cousin Haji Yar Mohammad was killed during a night raid on his house in March 2011.

Officials on the Afghanistan High Peace Council reacted with anger when former Guantanamo captive Sabar Lal Melma who they thought had already been cleared of suspicion, was killed during a night raid. Saber Melma had been subjected to repeated raids and seizures. Officials on the Commission thought they had been assured by senior US officials that US Special Forces were going to stop harassing Melma. Yet he was shot during a further raid in September 2011.

In April 2012, the United States and Afghan governments signed an agreement which specifies that all future night raids will be approved by the Afghan government and led by Afghan units. It was expected that the raids would continue, and be dominated by US forces due to a shortage of Afghan special forces units; prior to the agreement Afghan forces were involved in 97 percent of all night raids, but only led approximately 40 percent of these operations.

In April 2012, Abdul Salam Zaeff, another former Guantanamo captive, who had served as the Taliban Ambassador to Pakistan, fled Afghanistan because he feared US raids. On 9 April 2012, Al Jazeera reported that Zaeef left Afghanistan for the United Arab Emirates. Al Jazeera wrote "Zaeef feared for his life in the wake of the attempted raids on his home. Many of the Taliban prisoners freed from Guantanamo had been killed in night raids and that made Zaeef more nervous."

The Drug Enforcement Administration has acknowledged its role in submitting names of individual who would then be subject to night raids. The DEA is the lead agency in the Afghan Threat Finance Cell—an organization that tracked suspicious financial transactions.

Afghan president Karzai largely banned night raids from 2013. His successor Ashraf Ghani lifted this ban from November 2014. The operations were later conducted by Afghan forces with occasional assistance from American advisers.

Night Raids unofficially ended after the United States and its Allies left Afghanistan during the 2021 withdrawal.
