= Hit and Run (novel) =

2007 novel by Lurlene McDaniel

- Author: Lurlene McDaniel
- Cover artist: Mark Owen/Arcangel Images
- Language: English
- Genre: Realistic fiction
- Publisher: Laurel-Leaf Books
- Publication date: 2007
- Publication place: United States
- Media type: Hardcover, paperback
- Pages: 176 pages
- ISBN: 1-4395-9718-9

Hit and Run is a realistic fiction novel by Lurlene McDaniel, published in 2007. It focuses on four teenagers whose lives intersect following a hit-and-run car crash. The book is told from the alternating perspectives of the four teens.

== Plot ==
Laurie Stark is very excited when popular, athletic Quentin Palmer (Quin for short) asks her out on a date. While they are on their date, Analise Bower is babysitting. After her job has ended, she doesn't feel like asking for a ride. She says knows the roads and feels safer on her bike. While riding back home in Quin's mother's SUV, Laurie falls asleep and is awakened by a crash. Quin assures her that it was only a deer he mistakenly hit, though he isn't so sure himself. After seeing that the crash had damaged some property, Quin covers the scene and drives away. Sometime after the accident, Analise's talented boyfriend Jeremy receives a call from her parents concerning Analise's location. For a few days, Jeremy and Mr. and Mrs. Bower try to locate Analise. They are unsuccessful and hand the case over to the police. One morning, the police announce that they found Analise injured. Because of the attempt to cover the accident, the case is therefore called a hit and run. In the hospital, the doctors say that Analise has gone in coma because of a serious head injury.

Meanwhile, while at school, when the principal announces Analise's accident and she had been found on the side of the rode, Laurie is very shocked to hear that the accident's location is somewhat near the place Quin mistakenly hit a "deer". Her friend Judie, suggests that she use the information for her own benefit by blackmailing Quin to become her boyfriend. Laurie hesitates but does what Judie says to. Afraid that the incident might ruin his future as an athlete, Quin accepts and pretends to be Laurie's boyfriend.

A few months later, Jeremy receives a call from Mrs. Bower informing him that Analise had died. Guilty of her actions, Laurie emails Analise's friend Amy the evidence that is needed to prove that the SUV Quin was driving was the one which hit Analise. In Analise's point of view, she floats out of her body and outside the building. She passes Jeremy crying in his bedroom and Laurie sitting at her computer, not recognizing the latter, on her way to the light (To show that she is crossing over).

At the end of the book, Jeremy is the one who creates Analise's coffin with his beautiful wood carving skills. Action is taken against Mr. Palmer and his son. The story is finished with Jeremy saying: "Goodbye, my angel".

== Characters ==
- Analise Bower (A senior in high school. Long black hair, green eyes)
- Laurie Stark (A freshman in high school. Blonde hair)
- Quentin Palmer (A senior in high school. Light blonde hair, blue Eyes)
- Jeremy (Last name is not mentioned, Analise's boyfriend. A senior in high school)
- Jack Bower (Analise's father)
- Sonya Bower (Analise's mother)
- Amy (Analise's best friend)
- Mr. (Spencer) Palmer (Quin's father)
- Mrs. Palmer (Quin's Mother)
- Judie (Laurie's best friend)
