= Lurlene McDaniel =

American author (born 1944)

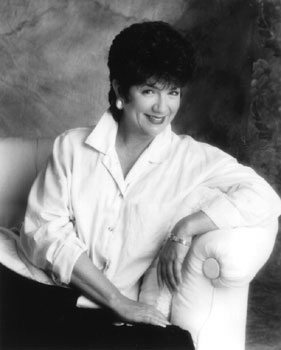
- Born: April 5, 1944 (age 82); Philadelphia, Pennsylvania, U.S.
- Occupation: Novelist
- Writing career
- Period: 1985–2022
- Genre: young adult
- Subjects: romance, medical drama, death
- Notable work: Now I Lay Me Down to Sleep
- Notable awards: RITA award – Young Adult Romance; 1992 Now I Lay Me Down to Sleep

Lurlene McDaniel (born April 5, 1944 in Philadelphia, Pennsylvania) is an American author who has written more than 70 young adult books. She is well known for writing about young adults struggling with mortality and chronic illness, a career that began as a therapeutic way to deal with the trauma when her son, then 3, was diagnosed with juvenile diabetes. Her characters have grappled with cancer, diabetes, organ failure, and the deaths of loved ones through disease or suicide. She is a graduate of the University of South Florida - Tampa and currently resides in Chattanooga, Tennessee.

== Research ==
To make her novels medically accurate, she interviews health professionals and works with various medical groups including hospices. She also studies the Bible to help infuse her work with "the human element—the values and ethics often overlooked by the coldness of technology."

== Other types of work ==
In addition to her young adult catalog and a magazine column, she has also written for radio, television and marketing campaigns. She is a frequent guest speaker, seen everywhere from schools to conventions.

== Partial bibliography ==
=== Novels ===
- For Better, For Worse, Forever
- Heart to Heart
- I’m a Cover Girl Now
- More than Just a Smart Girl
- Mother, Please Don’t Die
- Why Did She Have To Die (rereleased in 2001)
- The End of Forever
- What’s It Like to Be a Star?
- Where’s the Horse for Me / Three’s a Crowd
- Always and Forever
- Briana’s Gift
- If I Should Die Before I Wake
- Last dance
- Letting Go of Lisa
- Angel of Hope
- Sometimes Love isn't Enough (1984)
- Too Young to Die (August 1989)
- Goodbye Doesn't Mean Forever (August 1989)
- Somewhere Between Life and Death (1990)
- Time to Let Go (1990)
- Now I Lay Me Down to Sleep (March 1991)
- When Happily Ever After Ends (February 1992)
- Mourning Song (May 1992)
- Baby Alicia Is Dying (June 1993)
- Don't Die, My Love (August 1995)
- Saving Jessica (May 1996)
- I'll Be Seeing You (July 1996)
- Till Death Do Us Part (July 1997)
- For Better, For Worse, Forever (September 1997)
- The Girl Death Left Behind (May 1999)
- Starry, Starry Night: Three Holiday Stories (October 2000)
- Telling Christina Goodbye (April 2002)
- A Rose For Melinda (August 2002)
- How Do I Love Thee: Three Stories (December 2002)
- Garden of Angels (May 2003)
- The Time Capsule (September 2003)
  - Till Death Do Us Part and For Better, For Worse, Forever were reissued as a double novel, As Long As We Both Shall Live: Two Novels in October 2003.
- If I Should Die Before I Wake (January 2004)
- A Horse for Mandy (September 2004)
- My Secret Boyfriend (February 2004)
  - Too Young to Die and Goodbye Doesn't Mean Forever were reissued as a double novel, Always and Forever: Two Novels in May 2004.
  - Angels of Mercy and Angel of Hope were reissued as a double novel, Journey of Hope: Two Novels (October 2004)
- Sometimes Love Isn't Enough (December 2006)
- Hit and Run (2007)
- Prey (2008)
- All The Days Of Her Life (One Last Wish)
- Sixteen And Dying (One Last Wish)
- Reach for Tomorrow (One Last Wish)
- Breathless (May 2009)
- A Time to Die (One Last Wish)
- Please Don’t Die (One Last Wish)
- Mourning Song (One Last Wish)
- She Died Too Young (One Last Wish)
- Mother, Help Me Live (One Last Wish)
- Someone Dies, Someone Lives (One Last Wish)
- A Season for Goodbye (One Last Wish)
- Let Him Live (One Last Wish)
- The Legacy: Making Wishes Come True (One Last Wish)
- Reaching Through Time: Three Stories

=== Trilogies ===
The Angels Trilogy

- Angels Watching Over Me (November 1996)
- Lifted Up By Angels (November 1997)
- Until Angels Close My Eyes (August 1998)
  - Reissued as The Angels Trilogy (October 2002)

The Angels in Pink Trilogy

- Angels in Pink: Kathleen's Story (December 2004)
- Angels in Pink: Raina's Story (May 2005)
- Angels in Pink: Holly's Story (December 2005)

The Mercy / Journey of Hope Trilogy

- Angel of Mercy
- Angel of Hope

=== Quintets ===
The Dawn Rochelle Quintet

- Six Months to Live
- I Want to Live
- So Much to Live For
- No Time to Cry
  - These first four novels were combined into an omni titled Dawn Rochelle, Four Novels
- To Live Again (April 2001)

== Awards and reception ==
- 1992 - Romance Writers of America RITA Award, Young Adult Romance – Now I Lay Me Down to Sleep
