= List of civilian casualties in the war in Afghanistan (2011) =

List of civilian casualties in the war in Afghanistan in 2011

- February 2011 – A probe by Afghan government investigators concluded that 65 civilians, including 50 women and children, were killed in a NATO operation in Kunar province. Nato disputed the claim but Obama apologized for the incident.
- February 20, 2011 – A NATO airstrike killed an Afghan family of six in Khogyani, a district in the eastern province of Nangarhar.
- March 1, 2011 – U.S. helicopter gunners killed nine Afghan boys ages 7–13 who were collecting firewood. A tenth boy was injured in the attack.
- March 9, 2011 – German troops opened fire on civilian houses after they were abused by gun fire, killing a civilian women and injuring another one in Chahar Dara District of Kunduz Province, northern Afghanistan.
- March 9, 2011 – U.S. special forces killed President's Hamid Karzai cousin Haji Yar Mohammad during a joint NATO and Afghan forces night raid in Kandahar, Afghanistan.
- March 15, 2011 – Two Afghan brothers, aged 13 and 17, were killed by NATO helicopters while working on road and field drainage. The ground force commander and the air crew were suspended pending an investigation.
- March 24, 2011 – Two civilians, including a child, were killed by a NATO helicopter gunship in the Tere Zayi district of the northern province of Khost. The attack targeted a Haqqani network leader that was travelling in a vehicle. The two victims were nearby pedestrians.
- March 25, 2011 – A RAF Reaper drone remotely controlled from a US Airforce base in Nevada killed four civilians - two women and two children - as well as injuring two others in Naw Zad district of Helmand Province.
- March 27, 2011 – Australian troops were accused by Afghanistan's Independent Human Rights Commission of killing a civilian mullah and an infant aged 23 months near the village of Sah Zafar. Australian authorities claimed the adult was an insurgent.
- March 31, 2011 – NATO troops opened fire after a car with brake failure sped towards a checkpoint, killing two civilians and injuring four others.
- April 5, 2011 – NATO-led forces killed six civilians in a night operation in northern Afghanistan.
- April 6, 2011 – British troops accidentally killed two Afghan women in a car accident and shot dead a civilian man when an angry crowd attempted to prevent them from leaving.
- April 19, 2011 – A NATO airstrike killed three Afghan civilians as well as 14 insurgents in Dangam district of Kunar province, eastern Afghanistan. District governor Hamish Gulab said the civilians were two women and a child who died when a NATO missile hit a gathering of insurgents in a house.
- May 3, 2011 – NATO special forces raided a house which killed one Afghan woman and wounded three men, three women, and four children as well as six Taliban militants killed in night operation in Zurmat District of Paktia Province, Afghanistan.
- May 11, 2011 – NATO troops killed a 12-year-old girl along with her uncle when they accidentally raided the wrong house outside Jalalabad.
- May 14, 2011 – NATO apologized for the killing of a 15-year-old boy in western Nangahar Province in the Hesarek District.
- May 16, 2011 – Fazlullah Wahidi, governor of Kunar, said a group of girls collecting firewood near an insurgent hideout were struck by artillery fired by ISAF troops. A 10-year-old girl was killed and four others were wounded.
- May 18, 2011 – Four persons (two female) were killed by NATO forces in Takhar Province. NATO said the four were insurgents but local officials insisted they were civilians. "It was a wrong operation based on wrong intelligence information," said Shah Jahan Noori, the police chief of Takhar Province. At least a dozen additional people were killed as protesters later fought with police on the streets of Taliqan, the capital of Takhar Province.
- May 23, 2011 – A civilian was killed in Musa Qal’ah district, Helmand Province, when both Afghan and coalition forces mistook the flashlight a man was carrying for a weapon.
- May 25, 2011 – A Norwegian soldier accidentally fired a grenade into a police building in Faryab Province, killing one civilian and wounding another.
- May 26, 2011 – In Maidan Wardak Province, in the Lala Khel area, three civilian farm workers were killed by NATO troops, according to the provincial governor's spokesman.
- May 27, 2011 – A NATO bombing in Nuristan Province killed numerous Taliban, Afghan policemen, and civilians. Bakhtar News Agency reported a total of 75 people were killed. A later report put the death figure at 120. NATO denies any civilians were killed.
- May 28, 2011 – A NATO helicopter airstrike hit two homes killing 14 civilians (two women, five girls and seven boys) in Nawzad district. The helicopter was responding to an attack on a US Marine base.
- July 5, 2011 – Between 11 and 13 civilians were killed by a NATO airstrike in the province of Khost.
- July 6, 2011 – Hundreds of Afghans protested the deaths of two shepherds they say were killed in a NATO air strike. Residents of Khogyani took two bodies to nearby Ghazni City, the provincial capital of Ghazni, southwest of Kabul, where they shouted slogans like "death to foreign troops."
- July 11, 2011 – Afghan government officials said ISAF airstrikes killed between 9 and 16 people in the Azra district of Logar Province. An Azra lawmaker said that four of those killed were Taliban militants and the rest were civilians.
- July 12, 2011 – Four Afghan civilians were killed in a foreign air strike while fixing a water pump in Asmar district of northeastern Kunar province, Kunar governor Fazlullah Wahidi said.
- July 14, 2011 – NATO troops killed six civilians in a night raid of the village of Toora Worai in an area known as Matoon, about seven kilometres from the provincial capital of Khost city. One of the victims was an 11-year-old girl.
- July 17, 2011 – Afghan officials claimed that a drone bombing killed three civilians in Logar Province, and injured others, including children. The attack was confirmed by the deputy provincial police chief.
- July 18, 2011 – Two school employees were killed in a NATO bombing raid in eastern Nangarhar province.
- July 21, 2011 – A resident of Wardak Province claimed the ISAF killed three family members of a local cleric. ISAF troops were known to be conducting operations in the area.
- July 21, 2011 – NATO troops killed a female maternity doctor along with two family members in the Syedabad district of central Wardak province. ISAF apologized and awarded the family doctor's family $33,000 and three sheep in compensation.
- July 26, 2011 – ISAF forces killed three civilians in eastern Kunar Province. Two were high school students gathering firewood.
- July 27, 2011 – French troops killed three civilians, including a woman and a child, and wounded four others, in the Nijrab district of eastern Kapisa province when they fired on a car that did not stop as it approached. Also, one child was killed when Afghan police carried out a "controlled" detonation of explosives inside Kandahar city.
- July 28, 2011 – After an investigation into whether Ahmed Omed Khpulwak, an Afghan journalist working as a BBC stringer, was killed by ISAF fire, the ISAF said Khpulwak was mistakenly killed by an ISAF soldier who believed he was an insurgent.
- July 31, 2011 – ISAF command admitted killing an unarmed civilian in Dowlat District, Laghman Province.
- August 5, 2011 – Zabul Province police chief Mohammad Nabi Elhaam said angry residents took to the streets after they said three Afghan civilians had been killed during a night raid by ISAF troops. An additional four people were killed during the protests as Afghan police fired into a crowd. ISAF said it had no report of civilian casualties during its operation.
- August 6, 2011 – Afghan police said 8 civilians were killed in Helmand Province by ISAF troops. "The victims of Friday's air strike in Helmand were members of a family that had fled fighting in neighbouring Uruzgan province, police said." A woman and six children are among the dead. A later account said nine civilians died. Seven of the dead were children from the same family; the mother survived the attack.
- August 26. 2011 – Six Afghan civilians (all members of the same family) were killed in an ISAF air strike in the Baraki Barak district of Logar province, according to a local official. Four insurgents and three Afghan army members were also killed.
- August 27, 2011 – Two civilians were killed in Maidan Wardak Province. The incident took place in the Pombai area of Chak district. Locals protested, blocking the Kabul-Kandahar highway.
- September 2, 2011 – ISAF forces killed an Afghan citizen, Sabar Lal, in a night raid. A former prisoner at Guantanamo, there are separate opinions as to whether he was aiding insurgents or was merely a businessman. Also in dispute is the manner of his death, with some questioning why a well known business figure would have to be captured in a clandestine raid and then killed. The New York Times story said: "NATO said in a statement that Mr. Lal was killed after he ran out of the home wielding an assault rifle as they tried to arrest him. But a night watchman named Rahmatullah *** said he was at the residence the night of the raid and gave a different account. He said coalition forces stormed the compound, handcuffed and blindfolded Mr. Lal and his other guests, then took Mr. Lal out to a veranda. About 20 minutes later, Mr. Rahmatullah said, 'we heard gunshots.'"
- September 3, 2011 – ISAF forces killed a female civilian in Balkh Province.
- September 26, 2011 – Provincial Afghan official Inayatullah Mazhabyar claimed that 19 civilians were killed after a joint Afghan army/ISAF operation in Nuristan Province. Provincial police chief Brig. Gen. Shamsur Rahman Nuristani said that six members of a family were killed in an ISAF airstrike. However, Afghan army officials denied any civilians were killed.
- October 6, 2011 – During a raid by ISAF forces that killed Taliban commander Maskin in Kapisa Province, his 7-year-old daughter also was killed. Two other family members were injured.
- October 9, 2011 – According to a tribal elder, ISAF forces killed a farmer in Spin Ghar district.
- October 15, 2011 – A spokesman for the provincial governor of Kunar Province said an ISAF rocket shell hit a house in Asmar district, killing four civilians, and injuring six others. However, an Afghan National Army officer said it was not clear whose rocket shell had hit the house.
- October 16, 2011 – ISAF troops killed three people in a night raid in the Chak district of Maidan Wardak Province. According to relatives, they were all schoolteachers, and all related to a former senator. ISAF stated that three individuals in the house had pointed weapons at ISAF troops on the ground and that they recovered three AK-47 rifles, ammunition pouches, and a grenade after the battle. They had been searching for a Haqqani network leader.
- October 23, 2011 – Danish authorities stated that a preliminary probe suggests that one Afghani civilian was killed and another two were wounded near a Danish military base in Helmand province.
- October 31, 2011 – An Australian soldier reportedly killed a recently married 21-year-old Afghan civilian in the city of Tarin Kowt.
- November 24, 2011 – NATO forces were accused by President Karzai of killing 7 civilians, including 6 children (and injuring two young girls) from an errant bomb strike in the village of Siacha in the Zhari district.

== See also ==
- Civilian casualties in the War in Afghanistan (2001–present)
