= Khuddamul Furqan =

- Founder: Muhammad Ismaiel Mojadidi
- Founded: 1966
- Dissolved: 1979
- Succeeded by: Islamic Revolutionary Movement of Afghanistan
- Ideology: Islamism; Anti-communism

Khuddamul Furqan was Afghanistan's first Islamic political party, formed in 1966, primarily in response to the Soviet/Communist influence in Afghanistan. It was formed by Muhammad Ismaiel Mojadidi, who was the Dean of Afghanistan's oldest private Islamic institution (or madrasa), Nurul Madariss Farouqi in Ghazni, and the father of Abobaker Mojadidi. The party's members were mainly Afghan scholars (or Ulama).

Many of the party members belonged to the Naqshbandi-Mojadidi Tariqah, Afghanistan's largest religious and spiritual order. Muhammad Ismaiel Mojadidi's father, Muhammad Ibrahim Shaykh Ziaul Mashaw'ikh (a highly influential spiritual and religious figure), was the head (Sujjada Nesheen) of the Naqshbandi-Mojadidi order and was based in Qala Jawad, Kabul. Muhammad Ibrahim Mojadidi (Shaykh Ziaul Mashaw'ikh) is the son, and religious and spiritual heir to his father Nurul Mashaw'ikh Shaikh Fazl Omar Mojadidi (aka, Mullah Shore Bazaar) - the most influential and respected spiritual figure of Afghanistan.

Khuddamul Furqan had a newspaper called Neda-e-Haq (Voice of Truth) and its editor in Chief was Mawlavi Abdul Sattar Siddiqi. The party was very influential within Afghanistan's religious community. Khuddamul Furqan was known for its adherence to Islamic tradition and was politically moderate.

After the imprisonment of the Mojadidi family by Soviet forces and their allies in 1979, namely M. Ibrahim Shaykh Ziaul Mashaw'ikh and his son, leader of Khuddamul Furqan M. Ismaiel Mojadidi, the party's name was changed to Harakat-e-Inqilab Islami, in order to continue its efforts against the Soviet occupation without harming its respected leaders in captivity. Members of the party played a major role in the resistance movement against the Soviets in Afghanistan. Khuddamul Furqan was later revived in 2004 in Kabul and some of the party's members are playing an active role in the peace process in Afghanistan. One of Khuddamul Furqans top members Maulavi Arsala Rahmani was assassinated in Kabul on May 13, 2012.
