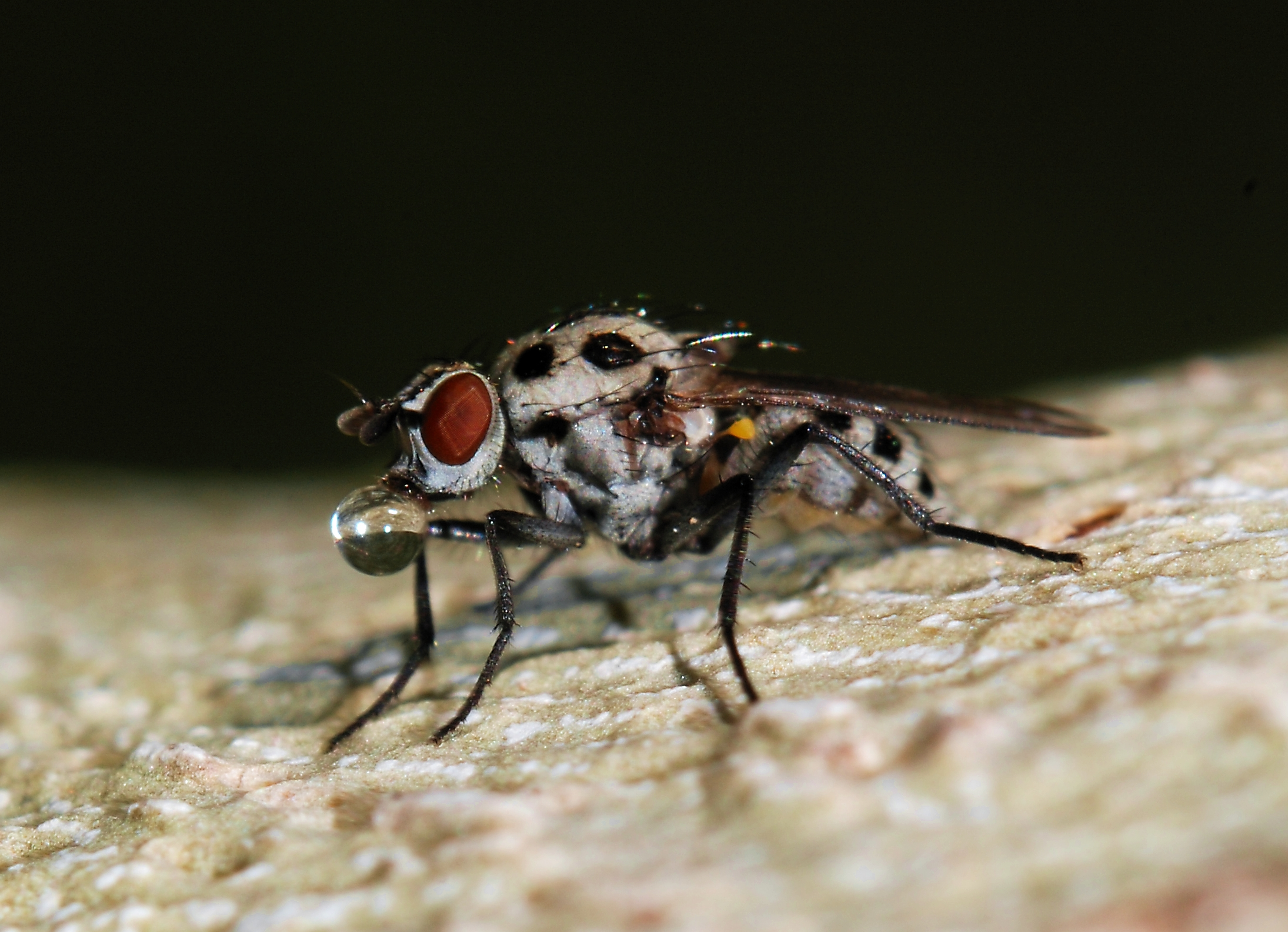

Scientific classification
- Kingdom: Animalia
- Phylum: Arthropoda
- Class: Insecta
- Order: Diptera
- Family: Anthomyiidae
- Subfamily: Anthomyiinae
- Tribe: Anthomyiini
- Genus: Anthomyia
- Species: A. pluvialis

Binomial name
- Anthomyia pluvialis (Linnaeus, 1758)

Synonyms
- Musca pluvialis Linnaeus, 1758; Musca lita Harris, 1780; Chortophila ignota Rondani, 1866

= Anthomyia pluvialis =

Species of fly

Anthomyia pluvialis is a species of fly in the family Anthomyiidae. It is found in the Palearctic.
