= For Better, For Worse, Forever =

1997 novel by Lurlene McDaniel

- Laurel Leaf edition 1997
- Author: Lurlene McDaniel
- Language: English
- Genre: Young adult romance
- Published: August 1997 Laurel Leaf
- Publication place: U.S.
- Media type: Paperback
- Pages: 224
- Preceded by: Till Death Do Us Part

For Better, For Worse, Forever is a young adult novel by Lurlene McDaniel, published in August 1997. It continues the story of April Lancaster, which began in the novel Till Death Do Us Part. The novel begins at the close of the previous story as April is crowned the winner of a beauty pageant for young women with chronic medical conditions.

== Plot summary ==
18-year-old April Lancaster suffers from a brain tumor. Despite living with tempestuous headaches, April found love with a race car driver Mark Gianni. Following Mark's death, April journeys to St. Croix, where she befriends Brandon. However, April is afraid of finding love again after Mark's death. She keeps to herself for a while, until one day her mother talks to her and suggests that if it had happened that April had died and Mark had lived, she would want him to be happy and to move on.

== Character histories ==
April Lancaster: April Lancaster is an 18-year-old whose life has changed drastically due to her ill health and the recent death of her boyfriend.
