= Joint Prioritized Effects List =

List of individuals who coalition forces in Afghanistan tried to capture or kill

The Joint Prioritized Effects List or JPEL was a list of individuals who coalition forces in Afghanistan tried to capture or kill. The Task Force 373 was working through the list. According to the Afghan War Diary German troops listed Shirin Agha with the number 3145 and on 11 October 2010 German troops killed Agha. Coalition forces were authorized to kill or capture individuals named on the list.

According to a document from the 2010 Afghan War Diary the list has 2,058 names. That list provided the intelligence basis for a pace of some 90 night-raids per month in late 2009.

PBS Frontline reported that the Joint Special Operations Command (JSOC) was executing targets on the Joint Prioritized Effects List. John Nagl, a former counterinsurgency adviser to General David Petraeus, described JSOC's kill/capture campaign to Frontline as "an almost industrial-scale counterterrorism killing machine."

Individuals on the list were assigned priority levels on a scale of one to four, with one being the most important. Since October 2008 the NATO defense ministers decided that drug networks would now be "legitimate targets" for ISAF troops. The United Nations estimated that the Taliban was earning US$300 million a year through the drug trade, and according to a leaked NSA document "the insurgents could not be defeated without disrupting the drug trade." In the opinion of American military commanders such as Bantz John Craddock, NATO's Supreme Allied Commander for Europe at the time, there was no need to prove that drug money was actually being funneled to the Taliban to declare Afghan couriers, farmers, and dealers as legitimate targets of NATO strikes. In early-2009 Craddock issued an order to expand the JPEL list to include drug producers, but such targets had to be investigated as individual cases after a complaint by the German NATO General Egon Ramms that the order is "illegal" and a violation of international law.
