= The Sick's Sense =

Studio album by End of Green
- Released: 15 August 2008
- Studio: Weltraum Studios (Munich)
- Genre: Gothic metal, alternative metal
- Length: 57:24
- Label: Silverdust Records
- Producer: Corni Bartels

End of Green chronology
Dead End Dreaming (2005)	The Sick's Sense (2008)

Professional ratings
Review scores
Source	Rating
Lords of Metal	85/100
Metal1.info	10/10

The Sick's Sense is the sixth studio album by German gothic metal band End of Green.

== Personnel ==
- Michelle Darkness – vocals/guitar
- Kirk Kirker – guitar
- Sad Sir – guitar
- Rainer Sicone Di Hampez – bass
- Lusiffer – drums

== Track listing ==
All tracks are written by End of Green

No.	Title	Length
1.	"Dead City Lights"	4:42
2.	"Killhoney"	4:57
3.	"Anthem for a New Wave"	3:09
4.	"Hurter"	5:36
5.	"Die Lover Die"	4:37
6.	"Let Sleeping Gods Lie"	5:40
7.	"My Crying Veins"	6:41
8.	"Pain Hates Me"	3:40
9.	"The Sickness Crown"	4:32
10.	"Ghostdance"	3:09
11.	"Sunday Mourning"	5:50
12.	"Bury Me Down (The End)"	4:51
Total length:		57:24

Bonus The Sickoustic EP included with limited edition
No.	Title	Length
1.	"Tragedy Insane" (Acoustic)	4:58
2.	"Melanchoholic" (Acoustic)	4:40
3.	"Hurter" (Acoustic)	4:42
4.	"Demons" (Acoustic)	3:57
5.	"Everywhere" (Acoustic)	3:47
Total length:		22:04

== Reception ==
Metal1.info reviewed the album positively, giving it a 10/10. However, Benjamin Foitzik only found it to be average.
