= End of Green =

German gothic metal band

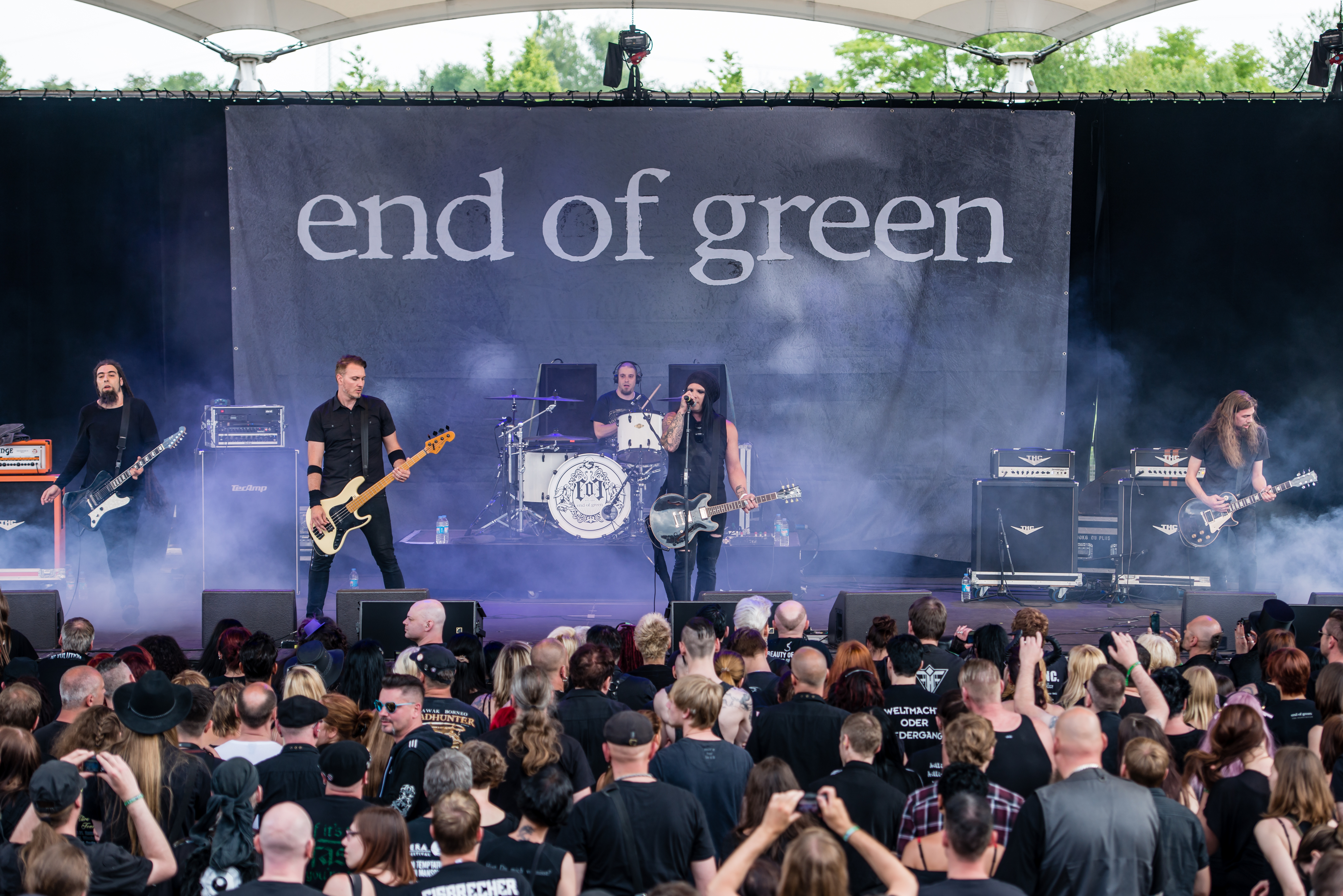
- End of Green performing in 2015

Background information
- Origin: Stuttgart, Germany
- Genres: Gothic metal, doom metal, alternative metal
- Years active: 1992–present
- Members: Michelle Darkness; Michael Setzer; Oliver Merkle; Rainer Hampel; Matthias Siffermann
- Website: endofgreen.de

End of Green is a German gothic/doom metal band formed in Stuttgart in 1992. According to singer Michael Huber, the band's name implies the end of the color green, which typically symbolizes hope. This fits with the type of music the band produces. The band describes its style as Depressed Subcore. The lyrics are about loneliness, depression, pain and death.

== History ==
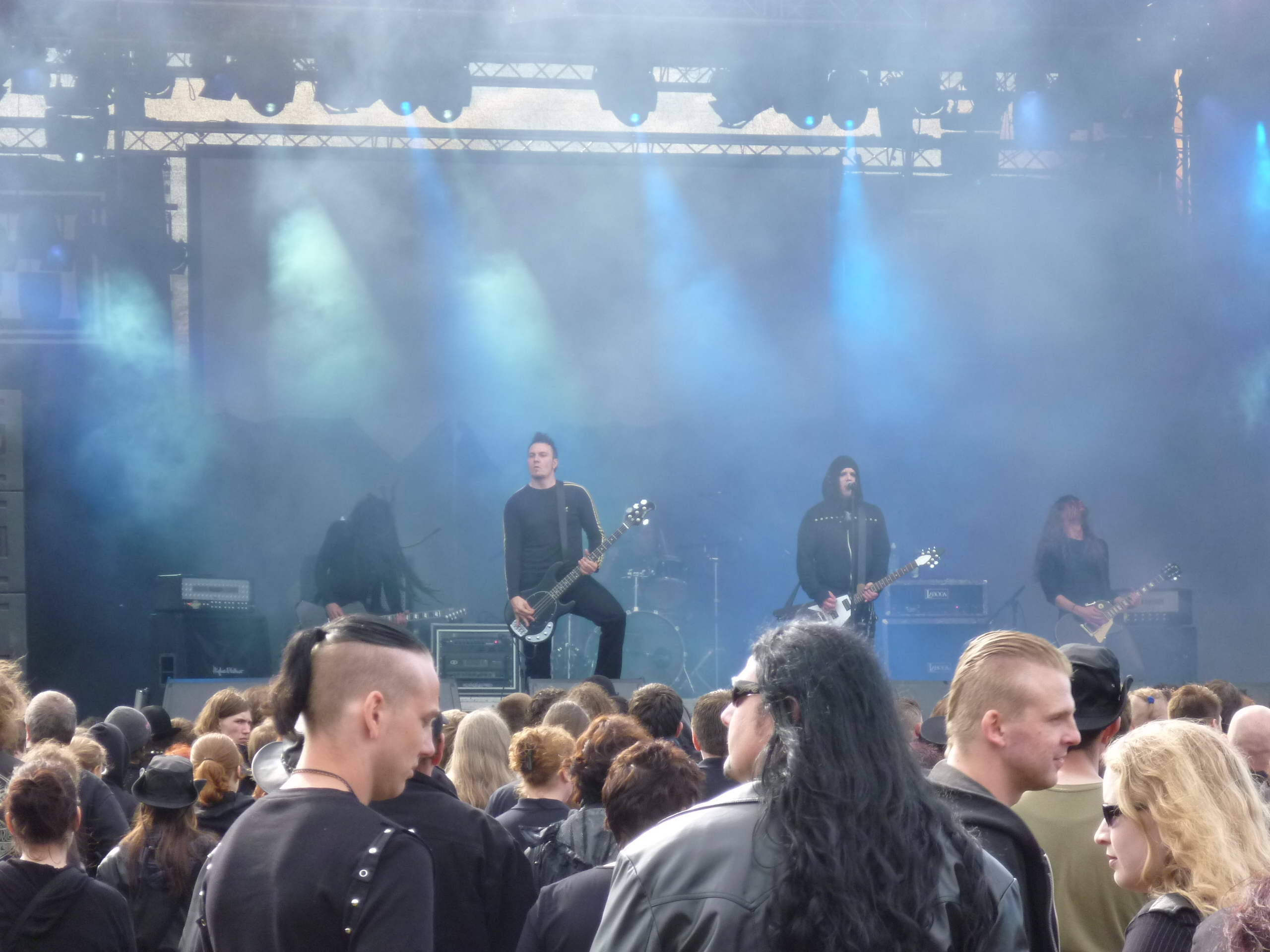
The band in 2010

The group released their debut album Infinity on Nuclear Blast in 1996. They have performed live with artists such as Paradise Lost, Iggy Pop, and In Extremo as well as playing at Wave-Gotik-Treffen and Wacken Open Air in 2006. On 15 August 2008, The Sick's Sense was released – the band's most successful record. The limited edition includes the Sickoustic EP, an acoustic bonus CD with four previous tracks and one new one.

== Members ==
- Michelle Darkness – vocals
- Michael Setzer – guitar
- Oliver Merkle – guitar
- Rainer Hampel – bass
- Matthias Siffermann – drums

== Discography ==
- Infinity (1996, Nuclear Blast, EMP)
- Believe, My Friend... (1998, Subzero)
- Songs for a Dying World (2002, Silverdust)
- Last Night on Earth (2003, Silverdust)
- Dead End Dreaming (2005, Silverdust)
- The Sick's Sense (2008, Silverdust)
- High Hopes in Low Places (2010)
- The Painstream (2013, Napalm Records) – Charted at #13 in Germany
- Void Estate (2017, Napalm Records)
- Ashes & Gold (2026, Reaper Entertainment)

=== Reissues ===
- Infinity (2002, Silverdust)
- Believe, My Friend... (2002, Silverdust)
