= Intracortical encephalogram signal analysis =

Learning and subsequent prediction of electrical activity

Intracortical encephalogram signal analysis (minedICE) is the learning and subsequent prediction of electrical activity inside the grey matter of the brain produced by the firing of neurons within the brain. The device was made by clinical researchers and medical Doctors at Columbia University, University of Colorado at Anschutz Medical Campus, and the University of Colorado at Colorado Springs.

Intracortical encephalogram signal analysis has two components: 1) an intracortical EEG multicontact electrode (ICE) that inserted through a patient's skull and deep into the grey matter of the patient, and 2) an artificial intelligent agent that is trained in neurological signal analysis.

== Clinical use ==
The (ICE) component comprises a catheter with platinum sensors that, when inserted into the brain allows for recording directly from the cerebral cortex of patients with acute brain injury. The Artificial Intelligent (see Machine learning) and Knowledge Discovery of neurological signals component was first derived from using Intracortical Electrodes in rats (see Brain–computer interface) to predicting epilepsy seizures in rats by 6 seconds (see Seizure prediction) [15]. These models used in the clinical environs of noisy domains, spectral analysis, knowledge discovery in databases (KDD), discrete finite automata and sequential and coincident power spectra are incorporated into the ICE component to read, learn and predict severe Neurological disorders.

=== Clinical demand ===
The prediction, detection and interpretation of abnormal brain electrical activity is an area wherein technological advancement is necessary in that current state-of-the-art methods for electroencephalography (EEG) are retrospective, prone to subjectivity and obviate real-time data interpretation that is often necessary to allow timely and accurate therapeutic intervention by neurologist and neurosurgeon. Intracortical encephalogram signal analysis is done by neurosurgeon clinical researchers and those who create artificial intelligent system for computing signal analysis, fourier transforms and Knowledge Discovery in Databases.
