= A Horse for Mandy =

2004 young adult novel

- Darby Creek Publishing 2004
- Author: Lurlene McDaniel
- Language: English
- Genre: Young adult romance
- Published: August 2004 Darby Creek Publishing; originally published in 1981
- Publication place: U.S.
- Media type: Paperback
- Pages: 575

A Horse for Mandy is a young adult novel by Lurlene McDaniel, published in August 2004. It tells the story of a young girl's struggle to find herself through her search for the perfect horse. The novel provides an important message on the dangers of tobacco use.

== Plot summary ==
15-year-old Mandy Underwood returns home from summer camp to find she no longer feels a connection to her friends and family. After spending a summer playing tennis and meeting new people, she no longer shares the shallow interests of the vapid friends of her small Rhode Island town. She feels most changed by the time she spent with the camp's Equestrian program. Now that she considers herself an adept rider, Mandy feels superior to her former friends Lydia, Patricia, and Elaine.

In an effort to win back her affections, Mandy's parents, Lloyd and Melody, decide to purchase a horse for Mandy. Mandy accepts their offer, but only on the condition that she can select the horse herself.

After visiting a number of stables, Mandy fails to find a horse that meets her standards. Lydia, Patricia, and Elaine try to show their support by throwing a horse-themed party for Mandy and even give her an expensive saddle to celebrate the occasion.

Finally, after months of searching, Mandy finds an ideal horse on a farm in New Hampshire. While visiting the farm, she meets Ted, the horse's current owner. Ted quickly informs Mandy that he has no patience for her superior attitude. Mandy finds Ted intriguing and they begin a long-distance relationship, writing each other daily letters. Mandy even names her horse Teddy in his honor.

Unfortunately, after six months of dating, Mandy discovers that Ted has a serious illness that he has kept secret from her. He suffers from salivary gland cancer, a disease with which he was diagnosed after years of tobacco use. Although Ted quit using chewing tobacco following his diagnosis, the damage was already severe. Mandy and Ted continue their relationship over the next three years until Ted ultimately succumbs to the effects of his disease. After his funeral, Mandy's friends Lydia, Patricia, and Elaine again extend an offer of friendship, but Mandy knows that they can never ease her suffering. Mandy writes a long note to her parents, apologizing for leaving and, with her beloved horse Teddy, begins a new life in Milwaukee.

== Character histories ==
Mandy Underwood: Mandy Underwood is a demanding, tenacious 13-year-old girl who longs for her own horse.

Ted Wirth: Ted battles bravely against cancer and helps Mandy battle the more negative aspects of her personality.

Lydia Harrington: One of Mandy's former friends who finds herself snubbed when Mandy returns home from camp.

Patricia Kline: One of Mandy's former friends who finds herself snubbed when Mandy returns home from camp.

Elaine Lopez: One of Mandy's former friends who finds herself snubbed when Mandy returns home from camp.

Lloyd and Melody Underwood: Mandy's parents who indulge her whims in an attempt to keep her happy.
