= Till Death Do Us Part (McDaniel novel) =

1997 book by Lurlene McDaniel

- Laurel Leaf edition 1997
- Author: Lurlene McDaniel
- Language: English
- Genre: Young adult romance
- Published: July 1997 Laurel Leaf
- Publication place: U.S.
- Media type: Paperback
- Pages: 224
- Followed by: For Better, For Worse, Forever

Till Death Do Us Part is a young adult novel by Lurlene McDaniel, published in July 1997. It is about a romance between two young people with serious medical conditions. The sequel, also published in 1997, is called For Better, For Worse, Forever.

== Plot summary ==
18-year-old April Lancaster, the child of Janice and Hugh Lancaster, enters the hospital for testing as she has been suffering from headaches, blackouts, and eventually passed out in English class.

During this time, April becomes acquainted with Mark Gianni, who has cystic fibrosis, and has been in and out of the hospital since he was born. Mark is very interested in April, and even tells her that he intends to marry her, but she declines his offer to go out, as she already has a boyfriend, Chris.

April is told by her doctor that she has an inoperable brain tumor, a recurrence of the case she had as a five-year-old, and needs to start radiation treatments. Soon after breaking the news to Chris, he ends their relationship, and April begins to date Mark.

Over time, the two fall in love, and Mark proposes to April. She accepts, although her parents aren't thrilled about the match. Eventually, they do reconcile to the idea.

Shortly afterward, the car that Mark is driving in during a race (he is an avid racing fan) flips over and ignites. Mark survives the crash, but he develops pneumonia and dies.

The book ends with April and her parents in St. Croix for a vacation. April releases a red balloon for Mark, as he had once done for her.

The sequel, For Better, For Worse, Forever begins with April in St. Croix.

== Character histories ==
April Lancaster: April Lancaster is an 18-year-old redhead whose parents shower her with, basically, whatever she wants. Despite this, April is a very down-to-Earth, caring teenager. April is in the hospital due to an inoperable brain tumor, a recurrence of a medical problem she had when she was five years old. April is dating Chris in the beginning of the book, but falls in love and accepts the proposal of Mark Gianni after they break up.

Mark Gianni: Mark Gianni is an Italian 21-year-old who never lets anything get in the way of his goal to race, despite the fact that it could be detrimental to his health, as he has cystic fibrosis. Mark falls in love with April, and proposes to her, although he dies at the end of the novel.
