= Infinity (End of Green album) =

Studio album by End of Green
- Released: 1996; 22 August 2002 (reissue)
- Recorded: 22 August – 4 September 1995; Nightmare Studios, Fautsbach, Germany
- Genre: Alternative metal, stoner metal, doom metal, gothic metal
- Length: 45:20
- Label: Nuclear Blast, Silverdust Records
- Producer: Ecki Erlenbusch

End of Green chronology
Infinity (1996)	Believe... My Friend (1998)

Professional ratings
Review scores
Source	Rating
Chronicles of Chaos	8/10

Infinity is the debut album of German metal band End of Green. It was released by Nuclear Blast in 1996 and re-released by Silverdust Records in 2002.

== Track listing ==
1. "Left My Way" – 6:03
2. "Away" – 5:14
3. "Seasons of Black" – 3:26
4. "Infinity" – 6:31
5. "Tomorrow Not Today" – 5:40
6. "Sleep" – 4:40
7. "You" – 5:26
8. "Nice Day to Die" – 3:37
9. "No More Pleasures" – 4:38
