= Head spade =

Heavy whaling tool for decapitation

A head spade is an instrument used in whaling. Its name comes from being a spade specialized for cutting off the head of a whale by chopping through the vertebrae at the base of the skull, though it is also used for cutting up other parts of the whale.

It is the heaviest spade used in the process of taking apart the whale. Its full length, including the pole, is approximately 1 metre or 3.5 feet.

A head spade can be used for either thrusting (like a spear) or cutting (like an axe).
