= Arsala Rahmani Daulat =

Afghan leader and politician (1944–2012)

Maulavi Arsala Rahmani

Member of the Afghanistan High Peace Council

Personal details
- Born: 1944 Paktika, Kingdom of Afghanistan
- Died: 13 May 2012 Kabul, Islamic Republic of Afghanistan
- Party: Khuddamul Furqan

Arsala Rahmani Daulat (died 13 May 2012) was selected to serve in the Meshrano Jirga, the upper house of Afghanistan's national assembly, in 2005 and 2010. He was appointed a Deputy Minister for Higher Education under the Taliban, in 1998. The United Nations Security Council issued Security Council Resolution 1267 in 1999, which listed senior Taliban members. The United Nations requested member states to freeze the financial assets of those individuals. He was one of the individuals who were sanctioned. He was also one of the four former Taliban leaders that accepted the reconciliation offer from the Afghan government. He was also named deputy leader of Khuddamul Furqan for political affairs.

In September 2010 Hamid Karzai named him as one of the seventy members of the Afghan High Peace Council. The Peace Council's mandate was to open negotiations with moderate elements of the Taliban, and convince them to abandon violence and participate in the political process. On 16 July 2011 the United Nations Security Council dropped his name, and that of thirteen other former members of the Taliban, from the list under the UNSC resolution 1267. On 13 May 2012, Daulat was shot dead in his car by assassins in his native Kabul.
