= Abobaker Mojadidi =

Afghan Muslim leader

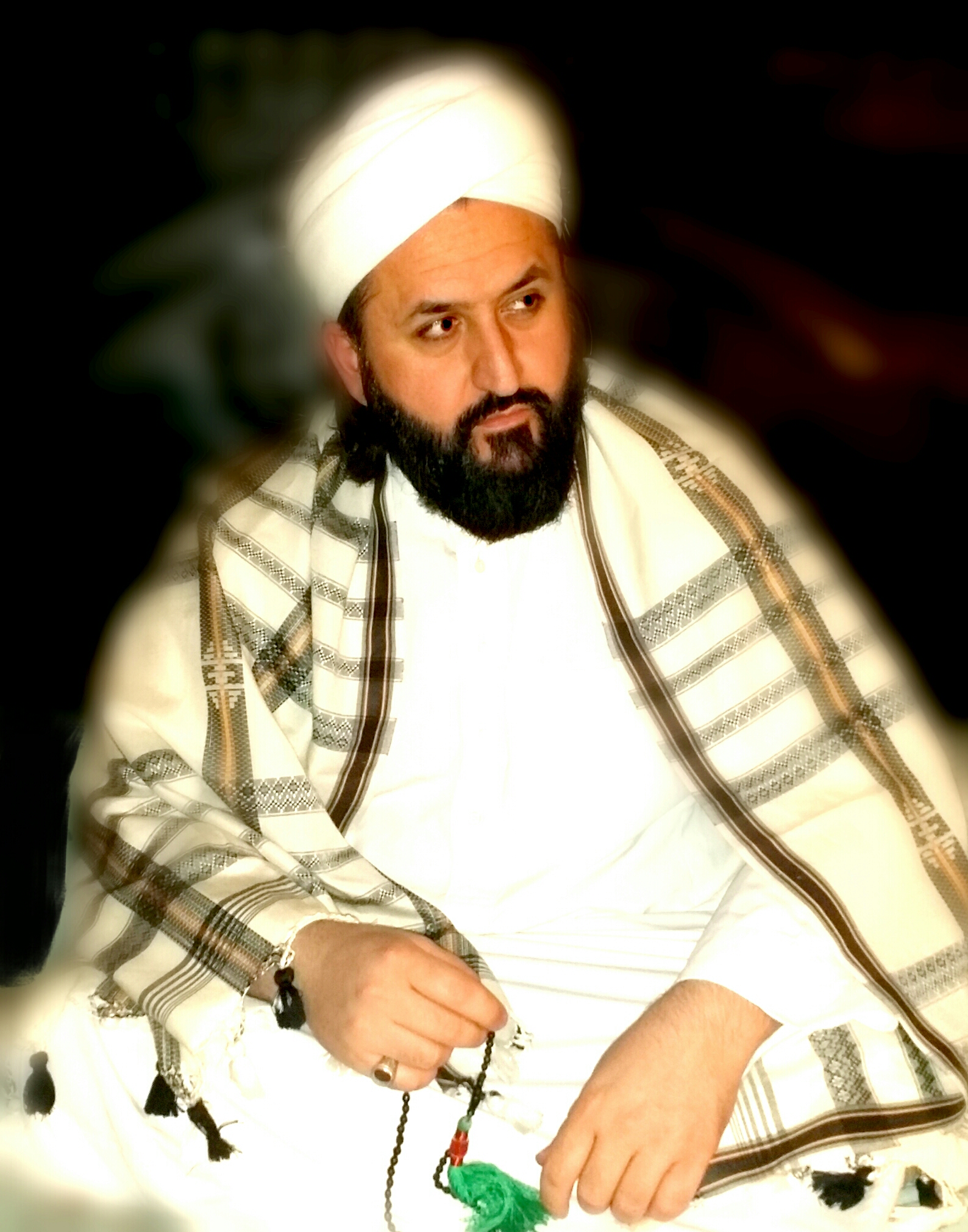
Photo of Abobaker Mojadidi

Abobaker Mojadidi (Dari:ابوبکر مجددی) is a spiritual Muslim leader and socio-political activist from Afghanistan. He is a prominent figure and head of the Naqshbandi-Mojaddidi Tariqah. He was born to the house of Afghanistan's most influential spiritual and religious family in Kabul at the home and monastery of his respected grandfather at the Naqshbandi Khanaqah in Qala-e-Jawad. Mojadidi's father was assassinated when Mojadidi was 9 months old. His entire family was imprisoned – his mother, father, siblings, and grandparents – by Soviet and Pro-Soviet soldiers of the PDPA regime due to the family's strong influence within the masses in Afghanistan. He was left behind with a peasant woman from Wardak named "Shireen" who acted as his nanny. Shireen hid him in a tandoor (clay oven) in order to hide him from Pro-Soviet government forces. When the soldiers came in the room, they saw only Shireen and departed, thus allowing him to escape. While the Mojadidi women and children were freed after a year, the whereabouts of his father Shaykh M. Ismaiel Mojadidi Dean of Nurul Madariss Farouqi in Ghazni and head of Khuddamul Furqan, his grandfather Shaykh Ziaul Mashah'ikh Mohammad Ibrahim Mojaddidi head of the Naqshbandi-Mojadidi Tariqah, uncles, and 140 other male relatives are unknown till this day. They are presumed to have been killed by the Soviet-backed forces.

It is said that Abobaker's grandfather had been informed that government forces planned an attack on the family, and was asked to leave the country for his own safety. In response, he said, "A Father never leaves his children and home in harm's way. Afghanistan is my home and Afghans are my children." The Martyrdom of the entire Mojadidi Family, a spiritual and religious family has been called the second Karbala (Karbala-e-Sani).

== Lineage ==
Abobaker Mojadidi is a direct descendant of the second Khalifah of Islam, Omar Ibn El Khattab Sayyidina Umar, and Shaikh Ahmad Sirhindi, revered as Mujaddid Alf-i-th(s)ani Imam Rabbani. The Mojadidi lineage was first established in Afghanistan by Shah Abul Fattah, the grandson of Abdullah bin Omar in the 11th century, and who is buried in Logar, Afghanistan.

Ustadh Abobaker Mojadidi's direct forefathers were all religious scholars and spiritual heads of the Naqshbandi-Mojadidi Tariqa. His great-grandfather Fazl Omar 'Nurul Mashaw'ikh' Mojadidi was known as the Kingmaker of Afghanistan, crowning King Amanullah, Nadir Shah, and Zahir Shah. "The Naqshbandi Shaykhs, the Mujaddidis, became the most prominent, politically involved religious leaders in Afghanistan in the twentieth century." (Islam and Politics in Afghanistan Page 51 (Asta Olessen).

== Migration ==
After months in captivity, the Mojadidi women and children were given amnesty and freed from prison. Abobaker Mojadidi's mother migrated from Afghanistan to Pakistan and eventually to America. Abobaker Mojadidi was 4 years old when they settled in America. He was raised by his mother in a home with four other siblings. In America, Abobaker Mojadidi began his efforts towards justice and peace at an early age. While attending John F. Kennedy High School he brokered a truce between gang members and began his teaching of his faith Islam. In high school, he also started one of the first Muslim Clubs and delivered Friday Jummah prayers in an American high school system. Several fellow high school students converted to Islam under Mojadidi.

== Education ==
Abobaker Mojadidi has studied under distinguished traditional Afghan scholars or Ulema in Afghanistan namely Shaykh Khaifa Dod Mohammed Ghaznavi, Ustadh Abdul Sattar Seerat Taloqani, Mawlawi Nasrullah Mansour (former leader of Harakat-Inqilab-i-Islami), and others. He also holds a Bachelors Of Science degree in Tele-Communications and Project Management.

== Socio-Political ==
Abobaker Mojadidi is involved in various organizations and activities. He had founded and heads a non-profit organization called LEAD that has been working at various levels; from charitable/humanitarian works to advocacy for balanced US foreign policy in Afghanistan, to helping curb the wave of Islamophobia in America. Abobaker Mojadidi recently condemned the violence and forced deportation of 1.6 million Afghan refugees from Pakistan, calling it a humanitarian crisis and urged Pakistan to work with international humanitarian organisations to ensure an effective and dignified resettlement process of Afghan refugees and to abstain from using unnecessary force and violence against innocent Afghan civilians.

Abobaker Mojadidi has organized workshops, small and large scale community dialogues and events focusing on behavioral health wellness, including domestic violence, youth violence, gang activity, substance abuse; interfaith exchange, and intercultural peaceful existence. He also works in the field of real estate investments, and tech in the Bay Area. Mojadidi is a respected lecturer in various speaking circles including Masajid and universities. Mojadidi is passionate about social justice and has led and organized many community events.

== Advocacy against military airstrikes and civilian casualties ==
Abobaker Mojadidi has aggressively advocated against Predator drone military airstrikes and has been a vocal critic against civilian casualties in Afghanistan.

== The Naqshbandi-Mojadidi Sufi Tariqah ==
Abobaker Mojadidi (حضرت ابوبکر مجددی) is working to bring about peace and unity in Afghanistan and across the globe. Abobaker Mojadidi is a leading spiritual figure of the Naqshbandi-Mojaddidi Sufi Tariqah.
