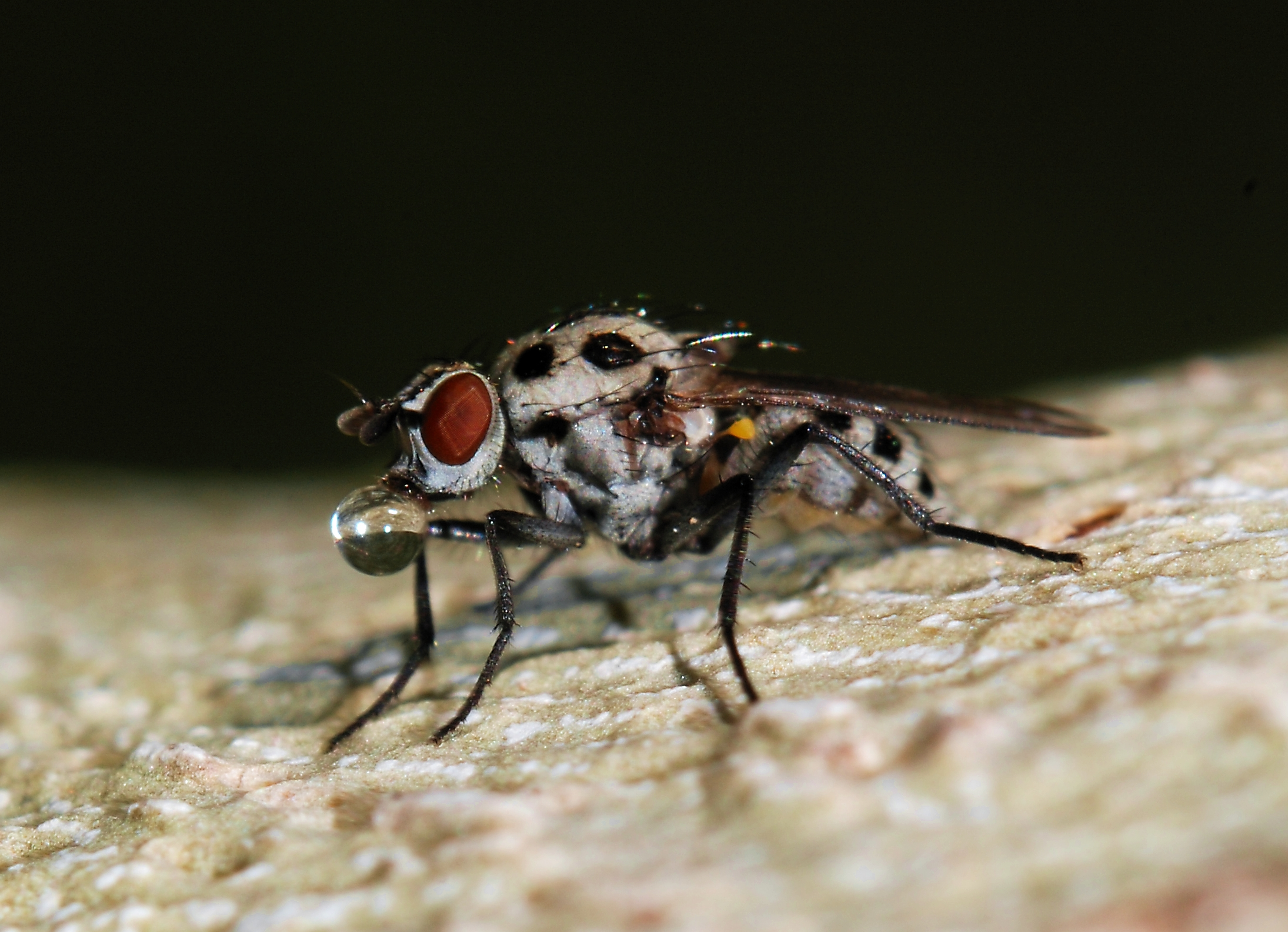
- Anthomyia pluvialis

Scientific classification
- Kingdom: Animalia
- Phylum: Arthropoda
- Clade: Pancrustacea
- Class: Insecta
- Order: Diptera
- Family: Anthomyiidae
- Subfamily: Anthomyiinae
- Tribe: Anthomyiini
- Genus: Anthomyia; Meigen, 1803

Type species
- Musca pluvialis Linnaeus, 1758

Synonyms
- Anthomya Rafinesque, 1815; Chelisia Rondani, 1856; Craspedochoeta Macquart, 1851

= Anthomyia =

Genus of flies

Anthomyia is a genus of flies in the family Anthomyiidae. They look rather like small houseflies, but commonly have conspicuous black-and-white patterning.

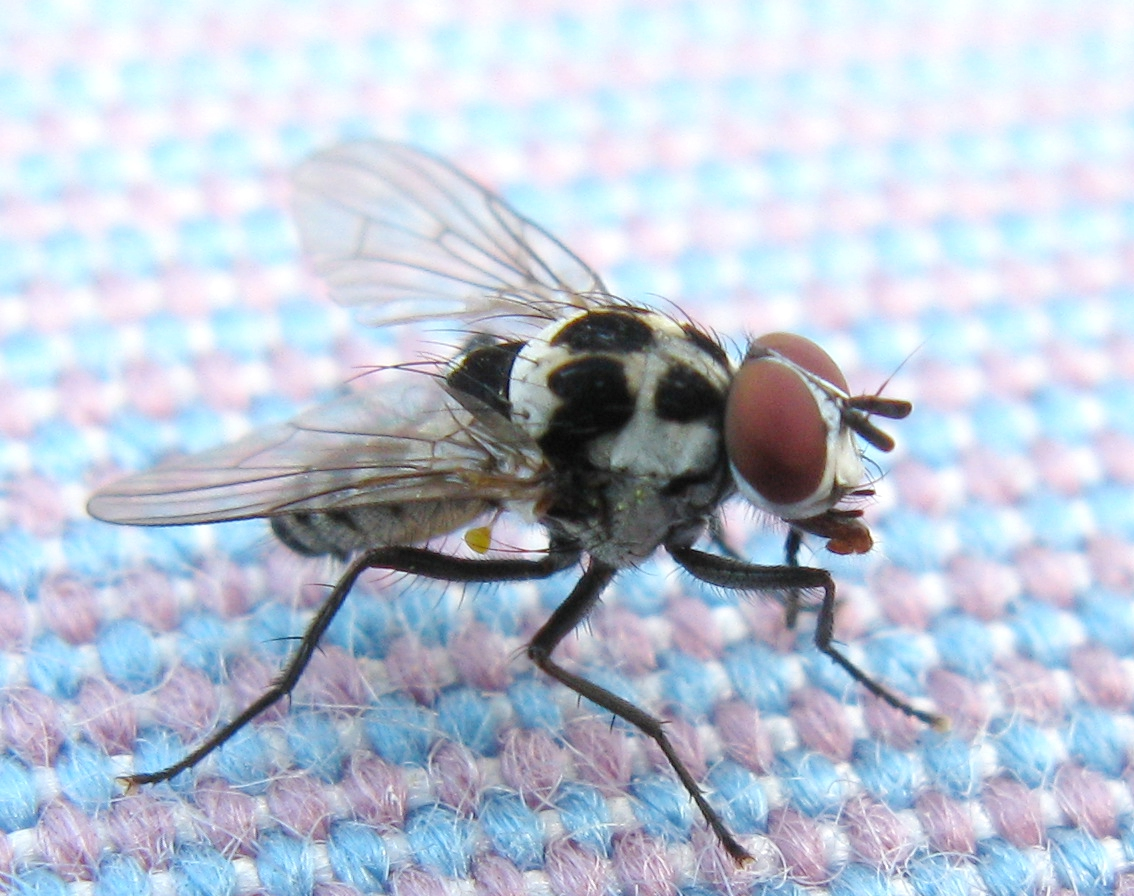
Specimen from wild pigeon's nest

Anthomyia procellaris laying eggs into faeces on a stump of tree

== Species ==
- Anthomyia bazini Séguy, 1929
- Anthomyia cannabina (Stein, 1916)
- Anthomyia canningsi Griffiths, 2001
- Anthomyia confusanea Michelsen in Michelsen & Báez, 1985
- Anthomyia facialis (Malloch, 1918)
- Anthomyia illocata (Walker, 1856)
- Anthomyia imbrida Rondani, 1866
- Anthomyia liturata (Robineau-Desvoidy, 1830)
- Anthomyia maura (Stein in Becker, 1908)
- Anthomyia medialis (Colless), 1982)
- Anthomyia mimetica (Malloch, 1918)
- Anthomyia monilis (Meigen, 1826)
- Anthomyia nigriceps (Huckett, 1946)
- Anthomyia obscuripennis (Bigot, 1886)
- Anthomyia ochripes Thomson, 1869
- Anthomyia oculifera Bigot, 1885
- Anthomyia plurinotata Brullé, 1833
- Anthomyia pluvialis (Linnaeus, 1758)
- Anthomyia procellaris (Rondani, 1866)
- Anthomyia punctipennis (Wiedmann, 1830)
- Anthomyia quinquemaculata Macquart, 1839
- Anthomyia tempestatum Wiedemann, 1830
- Anthomyia xanthopus (Hennig, 1976)
