= Glyphidops flavifrons =

Scientific classification
- Kingdom: Animalia
- Phylum: Arthropoda
- Class: Insecta
- Order: Diptera
- Family: Neriidae
- Genus: Glyphidops
- Species: G. flavifrons

Binomial name
- Glyphidops flavifrons (Bigot, 1886)

Synonyms
- Nerius flavifrons Bigot, 1886; Oncopsia mexicana Enderlein, 1922

Species of fly

Glyphidops flavifrons is a member of the Neriidae family of the order Diptera. This fly is found in the southern United States, Central America, and South America. Historically, it has also been called Oncopsia seductrix Hennig or Oncopsia mexicana. G. flavifrons live, reproduce, and lay their eggs on the bark of trees in the early stages of decay. In this species, it is common to see the male flies to exhibit aggression in the presence of the females. These males may attack the copulating pair to help decrease the chances of other males mating and increase their own chances.

== Phylogeny ==
=== Neriidae family ===
G. flavifrons is part of the Neriidae family of flies, which are broadly characterized by their elongated, forward-facing antennae with bristles along the top and a pedicel connecting to the middle region of the first flagellomere of the antenna. Species in this family typically display sexual dimorphism. Although they have been found in multiple regions around the world, Neriidae are mainly concentrated and are most diverse in the tropics. Currently, Neriidae is accepted as one of the families in the larger Nerioidea superfamily, which also includes the diverse Micropezidae with Neriidae and Cypselosomatidae making up the two less-diverse sister taxa.

Neriidae is divided into two subfamilies, Neriinae and Telostylinae, which can be distinguished by the presence of antennal sockets in the former and the lack thereof in the latter. G. flavifrons falls within the Neriinae subfamily according to phylogenetic analysis.

Despite multiple methods of characterization being used in the past, the Neriidae clade was always supported by data, with many of the ancestral characteristics, such as an elongated head and top-oriented antennal bristles, remaining consistent across multiple phylogenetic trees.

=== Glyphidops genus ===
All species of neriids outside of the Australian-Oriental region can be traced to a single origin. Ancestral traits still present in these species are larger frontal and genal regions of the head, shorter femoral length, and the presence of notopleural bristles on the forecoxae of males.

G. flavifrons are further classified into the Nerius group, which is characterized by larger female size, polished dorsal surface of the antennae, and a reduction in bristle length. Glyphidops is the most diverse Neotropical genera and cannot be further broken down into sub-genera based on analysis showing that the characteristic dense, whitish antennal pubescence was derived from a minimum of two convergence events.

== Distribution ==
G. flavifrons can be found in southern North America, Central America, and South America. More broadly, these regions are defined as the Nearctic Region (southern United States) and the Neotropical Region (Central and South America). It is therefore one of the most widely distributed flies in the Neriidae family.

== Life history ==
=== Egg ===
G. flavifrons eggs laid in situ on C. papaya and T. zebrina tree stems hatch on average 58 ± 4 hours after being laid. Eggs have a semi-cylindrical shape with a blunt posterior region measuring between 1-1.24 mm. Each egg has two longitudinally lateral hatching lines within the rear 1/6 of the egg body. Respiratory filaments extend from the anterior portion of the egg body and can measure up to 3.21 times its length. Before hatching, larvae move the body and lower jaw against the inner wall of the egg until they break through the posterior section.

=== Larvae ===
The larval stage is defined by three distinct larval instars. Total larval development time across all three instars is 10 ± 1 days, with larvae consistently presenting as worm-like with hairless, light-to-semi-transparent bodies. While in the larval stage, the head is fully retractable and has two mouth hooks protruding from the lower jaw. The thorax has well-defined pro-, meso-, and meta- sections with eight distinct abdominal sections containing small spines on all but two sections.

==== L_{1} ====
Larvae range from 1.22 to 2.52 mm in length. This instar is characterized by bi-segmented antennae with an ovular top portion and a mandible that is slightly sclerotized, three times longer than it is wide, and containing 7-8 ventral teeth. No anterior spiracles can be observed at this stage.

==== L_{2} ====
Larvae range from 2.95- 6.2 mm in length. Antennae are split into two antennomeres, or sections that are distally ovular. The number of teeth increases from 7-8 in the first instar to 10 teeth in the second instar. Anterior spiracles can be seen and measure as 2.5 times longer than the greatest width.

==== L_{3} ====
Larvae range from 6-11.6 mm in length. Antennae have three antennomeres and the mandible no longer has individual teeth, but rather is completely fused into a mouth hook. The anterior spiracle is 0.8 times as wide as it is long and contains 9-11 digits.

=== Puparium ===
The pupa forms beneath the outer cuticle of the larvae and is 5.48-7.94 mm in length. It is reddish-brown with prominent wrinkles on two of the segments. Anterior spiracles are situated at the front of the pupa and contain 9-11 digits, all sclerotized. The puparium stage lasts 13 ± 2 days, with pupation itself lasting between 150 and 175 minutes. The adult fly emerges from a circular suture between the anterior spiracles and halfway through the abdominal sections, which completely separate as the adult emerges.

== Mating ==
Copulation takes place on the same tree segments that the females eventually oviposit on. The bark of these trees is thin (0.5-1.0 cm thick) and still firmly attached to the inner bark. Copulation happens either before or between bouts of oviposition. Once a male happens upon a female, he approaches and mounts her, typically with little resistance. Copulation begins when the male positions his postabdomen over the ovipositor of the female, who raises the tip of her abdomen in response. If the female does not immediately respond to the male mounting her, he vibrates one or both of his legs next to the female's head. Copulation itself is brief, lasting approximately 24.10± 5.18 seconds, and is preceded by little or no pre-copulatory courtship. Males have been observed following females post-copulation as the female oviposits, sometimes mating between each bout of oviposition.

=== Male aggression ===
Male aggression typically only occurs in the presence of a female. Lone males crossing paths while looking for a mate are most likely to ignore each other, although there is a chance one or both will display low-level aggression in the form of jerky, sudden dashes toward the other individual. The majority of aggressive male behavior is observed in the presence of females. Males are known to attack copulating pairs, most often with preliminary threat tactics such as stilting or dashing toward the pair in an effort to displace the male. Usually the battle is won by the larger male. Higher-level aggression manifests in physical contact initiated by one male lunging at one another and is resolved either when one male walks away or both males fall off the bark.

== Oviposition ==
Oviposition occurs on the same bark that mating did. Females wander over the surface of the bark without an obvious pattern while periodically inserting their ovipositor in the bark to leave behind an egg. Ovipositors remain embedded in the bark for variable amounts of time at variable depths. Some females have been observed to spread their oviposition across the surface of the bark they are on, while others stay in the same small area for longer periods of time, continuously inserting and extracting their ovipositor multiple times in close proximity to the previous puncture. Females who move around while ovipositing have been shown to move multiple centimeters between punctures.
