= Pseudopomyzella =

Scientific classification
- Kingdom: Animalia
- Phylum: Arthropoda
- Clade: Pancrustacea
- Class: Insecta
- Order: Diptera
- Family: Pseudopomyzidae
- Genus: Pseudopomyzella; Hennig, 1969

Type species
- Pseudopomyzella flava Hennig, 1969

Genus of flies

Pseudopomyzella is a genus of flies in the family Pseudopomyzidae.

== Distribution ==
Peru.

== Species ==
- Pseudopomyzella flava Hennig, 1969
