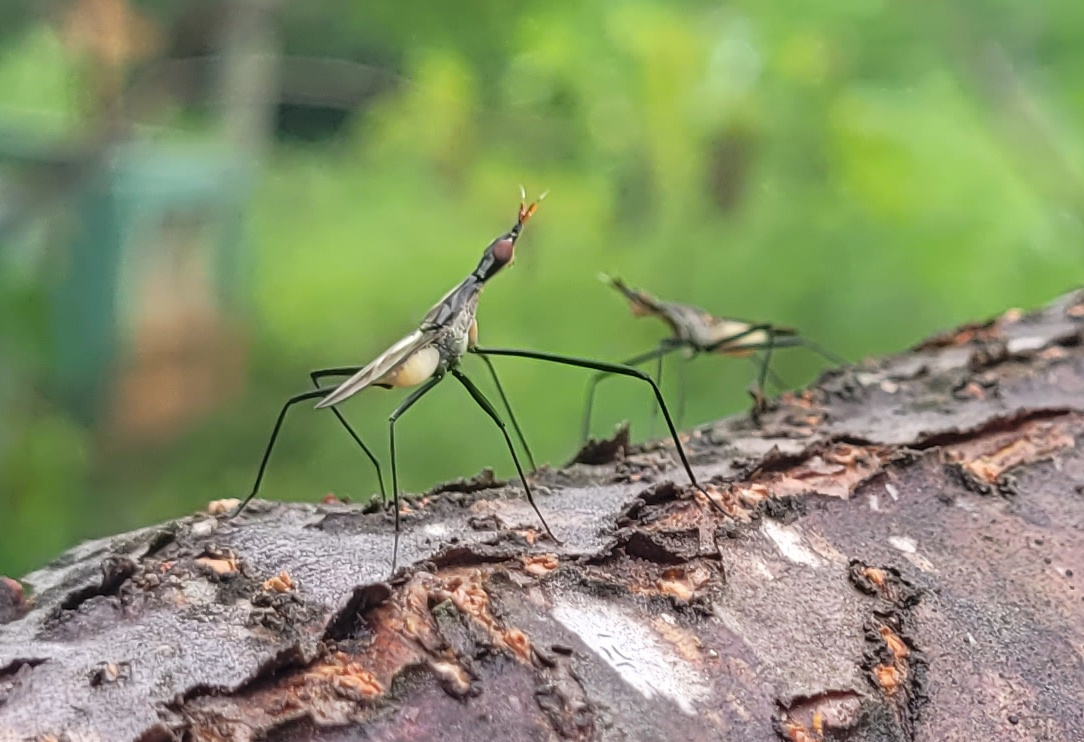
- Gymnonerius fuscus from Bukidnon, Mindanao, Philippines

Scientific classification
- Kingdom: Animalia
- Phylum: Arthropoda
- Clade: Pancrustacea
- Class: Insecta
- Order: Diptera
- Family: Neriidae
- Genus: Gymnonerius; Hendel, 1913

Type species
- Nerius fuscus Wiedemann, 1821

= Gymnonerius =

Genus of flies

Gymnonerius is a genus of flies in the family Neriidae.

== Species ==
- Gymnonerius andamanensis Hennig, 1937
- Gymnonerius apicalis (Wiedemann, 1830)
- Gymnonerius ceylanicus Hennig, 1937
- Gymnonerius dimidiatus Cresson, 1926
- Gymnonerius fuscus (Wiedemann, 1821)
- Gymnonerius hendeli Hennig, 1937
