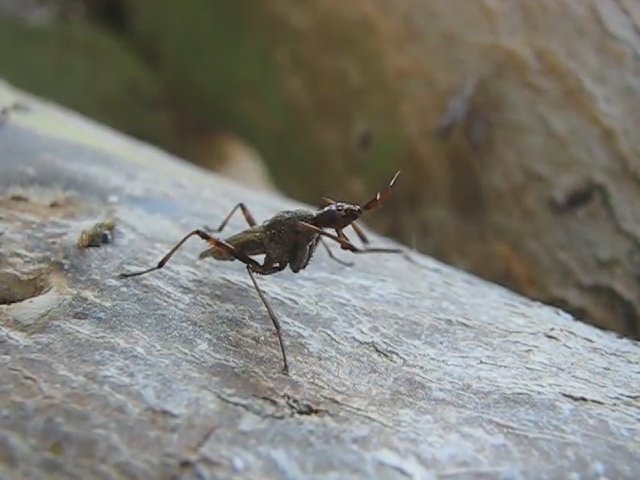
- Odontoloxozus longicornis

Scientific classification
- Kingdom: Animalia
- Phylum: Arthropoda
- Clade: Pancrustacea
- Class: Insecta
- Order: Diptera
- Family: Neriidae
- Genus: Odontoloxozus; Enderlein, 1922

Type species
- Odontoloxozus punctulatus Enderlein, 1922

= Odontoloxozus =

Genus of flies

Odontoloxozus is a genus of cactus flies in the family Neriidae.

== Species ==
- Odontoloxozus longicornis (Coquillett, 1904) (longhorn cactus fly)
- Odontoloxozus pachycericola Mangan & Baldwin, 1986
- Odontoloxozus peruanus Hennig, 1937
