= Chaetonerius =

Scientific classification
- Kingdom: Animalia
- Phylum: Arthropoda
- Class: Insecta
- Order: Diptera
- Family: Neriidae
- Genus: Chaetonerius; Hendel, 1903

Type species
- Nerius inermis Schiner, 1868

Genus of flies

Chaetonerius is a genus of flies in the family Neriidae.

== Species ==
- Chaetonerius alboniger Hennig, 1937
- Chaetonerius alluaudi (Giglio-Tos, 1895)
- Chaetonerius apicalis (Walker, 1849)
- Chaetonerius brachialis Enderlein, 1922
- Chaetonerius claricoxa Enderlein, 1922
- Chaetonerius colaveti Sepúlveda & Marinomi, 2021
- Chaetonerius collarti Aczél, 1954
- Chaetonerius compeditus Hennig, 1937
- Chaetonerius comperei Cresson, 1926
- Chaetonerius echinus Hennig, 1937
- Chaetonerius fuelleborni Enderlein, 1922
- Chaetonerius ghesquierei Aczél, 1954
- Chaetonerius inermis (Schiner, 1868)
- Chaetonerius latifemur Enderlein, 1922
- Chaetonerius londti Barraclough, 1993
- Chaetonerius niger Czerny, 1932
- Chaetonerius nolae Barraclough, 1993
- Chaetonerius nyassicus Enderlein, 1922
- Chaetonerius obscurus (Brunetti, 1913)
- Chaetonerius perstriatus (Speiser, 1910)
- Chaetonerius simillimus (Karsch, 1887)
- Chaetonerius spinibrachium Enderlein, 1922
- Chaetonerius spinosissimus (Karsch, 1887)
- Chaetonerius stichodactylus Sepúlveda, Echeverry & Souza, 2020
- Chaetonerius uniannulatus (Brunetti, 1929)
- Chaetonerius wittei Aczél, 1954
