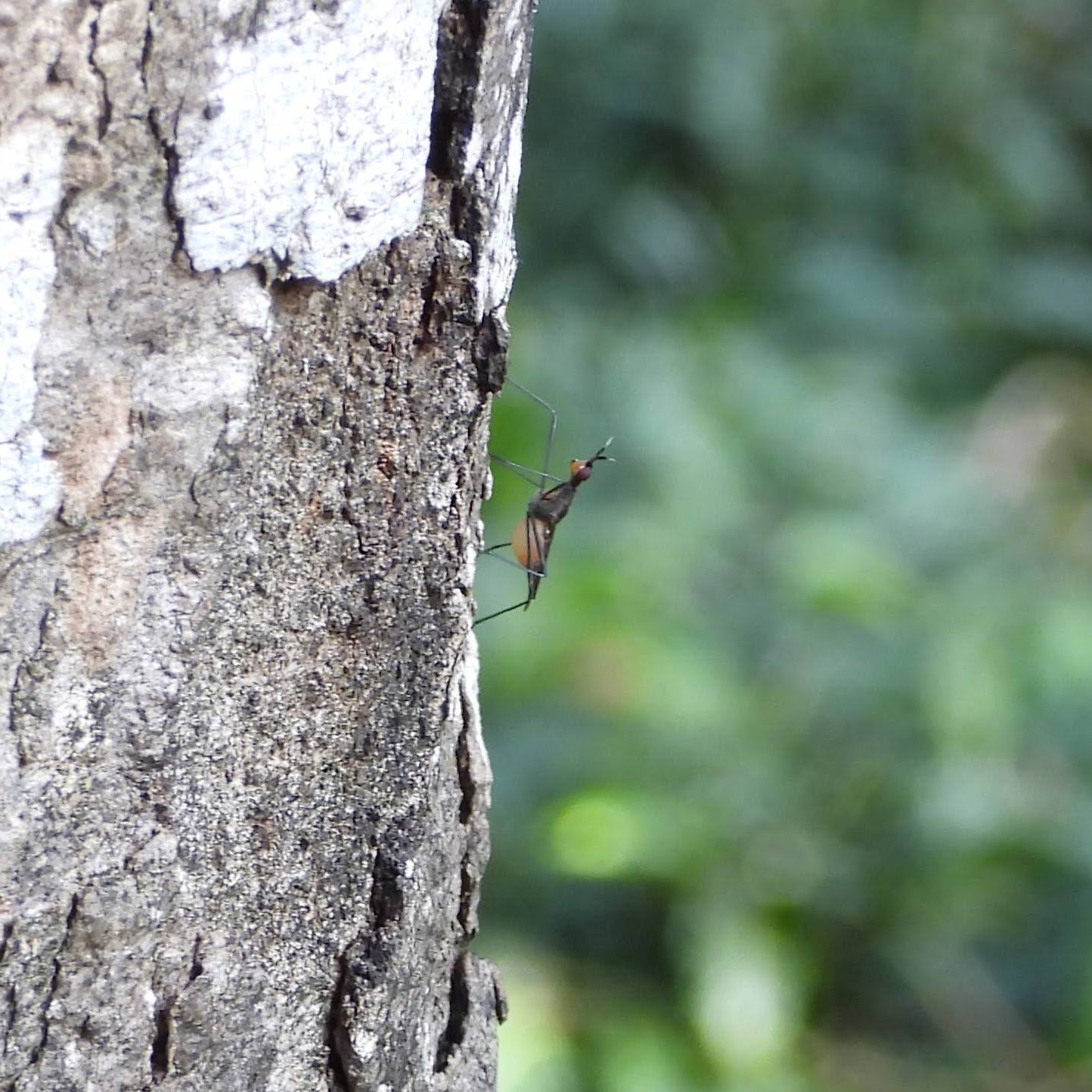

Scientific classification
- Kingdom: Animalia
- Phylum: Arthropoda
- Class: Insecta
- Order: Diptera
- Family: Neriidae
- Genus: Telostylinus; Enderlein, 1922

Type species
- Nerius lineolatus Wiedemann, 1830

= Telostylinus =

Genus of flies

Telostylinus is a genus of flies in the family Neriidae.

== Species ==
- Telostylinus bilineatus (Meijere, 1911)
- Telostylinus dahli Enderlein, 1922
- Telostylinus duplicatus (Wiedemann, 1830)
- Telostylinus gressitti Aczél, 1959
- Telostylinus humeralis Meijere, 1924
- Telostylinus lineolatus (Wiedemann, 1830)
- Telostylinus longicoxa (Thomson, 1869)
- Telostylinus longipennis Aczél, 1954
- Telostylinus luridus Enderlein, 1922
- Telostylinus mocsaryi (Kertész, 1899)
- Telostylinus montanus (Meijere, 1911)
- Telostylinus papuanus (Meijere, 1915)
- Telostylinus ponapensis Aczél, 1959
- Telostylinus praeses Hennig, 1937
- Telostylinus speculator Hennig, 1937
- Telostylinus spinicoxa Aczél, 1954
- Telostylinus sumatrensis (Meijere, 1919)
- Telostylinus tinctipennis (Meijere, 1919)
- Telostylinus yapensis Aczél, 1959
- Telostylinus zonalis Aczél, 1954
