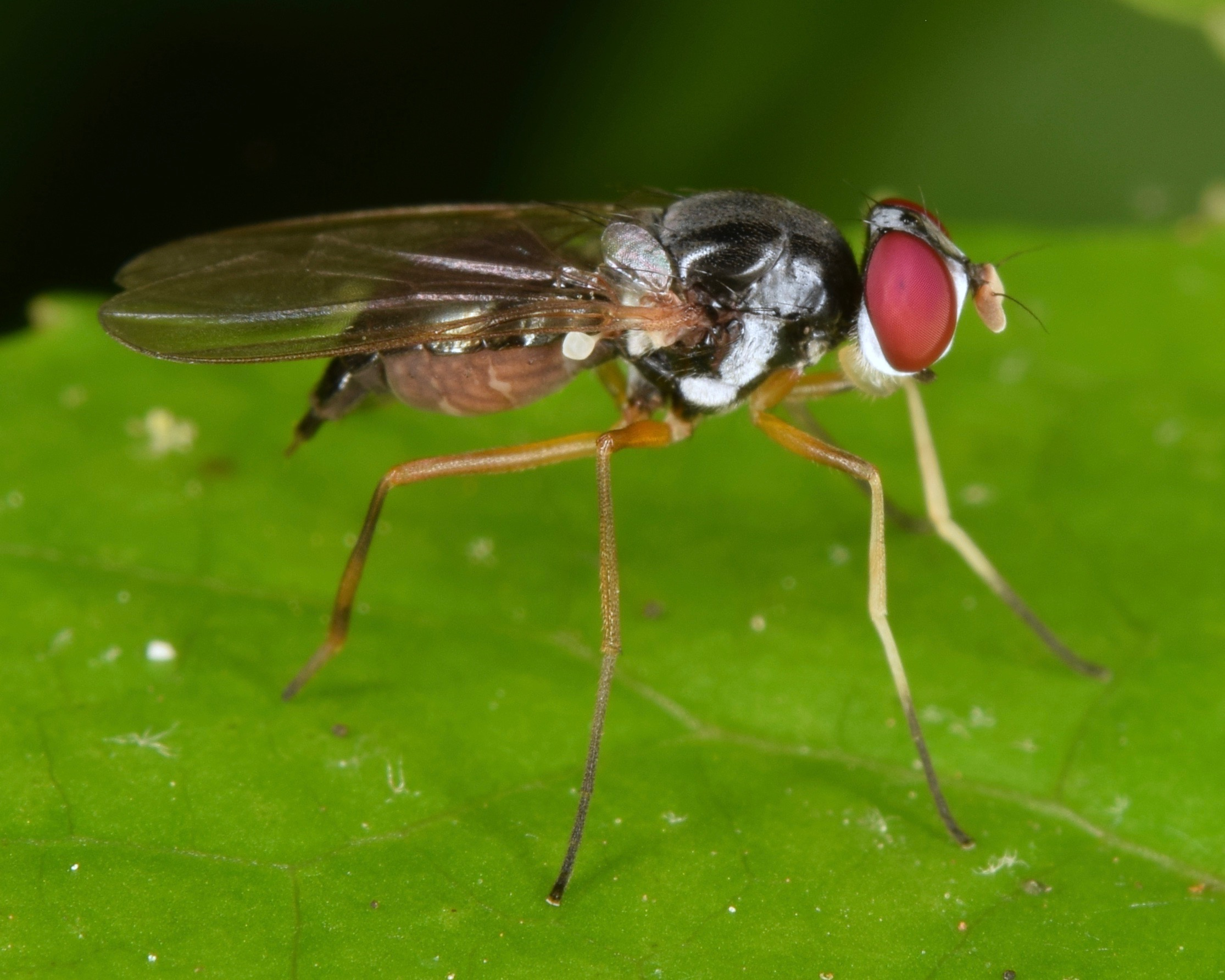

Scientific classification
- Kingdom: Animalia
- Phylum: Arthropoda
- Class: Insecta
- Order: Diptera
- Family: Tanypezidae
- Genus: Tanypeza
- Species: T. picticornis

Binomial name
- Tanypeza picticornis Knab & Shannon, 1916

= Tanypeza picticornis =

Species of fly

Tanypeza picticornis is a species of fly in the family Tanypezidae.
