= Paranerius =

Scientific classification
- Kingdom: Animalia
- Phylum: Arthropoda
- Class: Insecta
- Order: Diptera
- Family: Neriidae
- Genus: Paranerius; Bigot, 1883

Type species
- Paranerius miki Bigot, 1883

Genus of flies

Paranerius is a genus of flies in the family Neriidae.

== Species ==
- Paranerius continentalis Hennig, 1937
- Paranerius fibulatus Enderlein, 1922
- Paranerius mikii Bigot, 1883
