= Eoloxozus sabroskyi =

Scientific classification
- Kingdom: Animalia
- Phylum: Arthropoda
- Class: Insecta
- Order: Diptera
- Family: Neriidae
- Genus: Eoloxozus
- Species: E. sabroskyi

Binomial name
- Eoloxozus sabroskyi (Aczél, 1961)

Species of fly

Eoloxozus sabroskyi is a species of true fly in the genus Eoloxozus. It is found in Peru.
