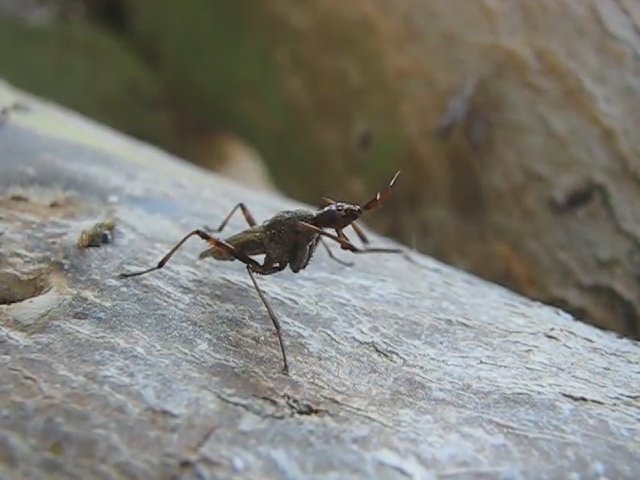

Scientific classification
- Kingdom: Animalia
- Phylum: Arthropoda
- Class: Insecta
- Order: Diptera
- Family: Neriidae
- Genus: Odontoloxozus
- Species: O. longicornis

Binomial name
- Odontoloxozus longicornis (Coquillett, 1904)

Synonyms
- Nerius longicornis Coquillett, 1904; Odontoloxozus punctulatus Enderlein, 1922

= Odontoloxozus longicornis =

Species of fly

Odontoloxozus longicornis, the longhorn cactus fly, is a species of cactus flies (insects in the family Neriidae).

== Distribution ==
Mexico, Costa Rica.
