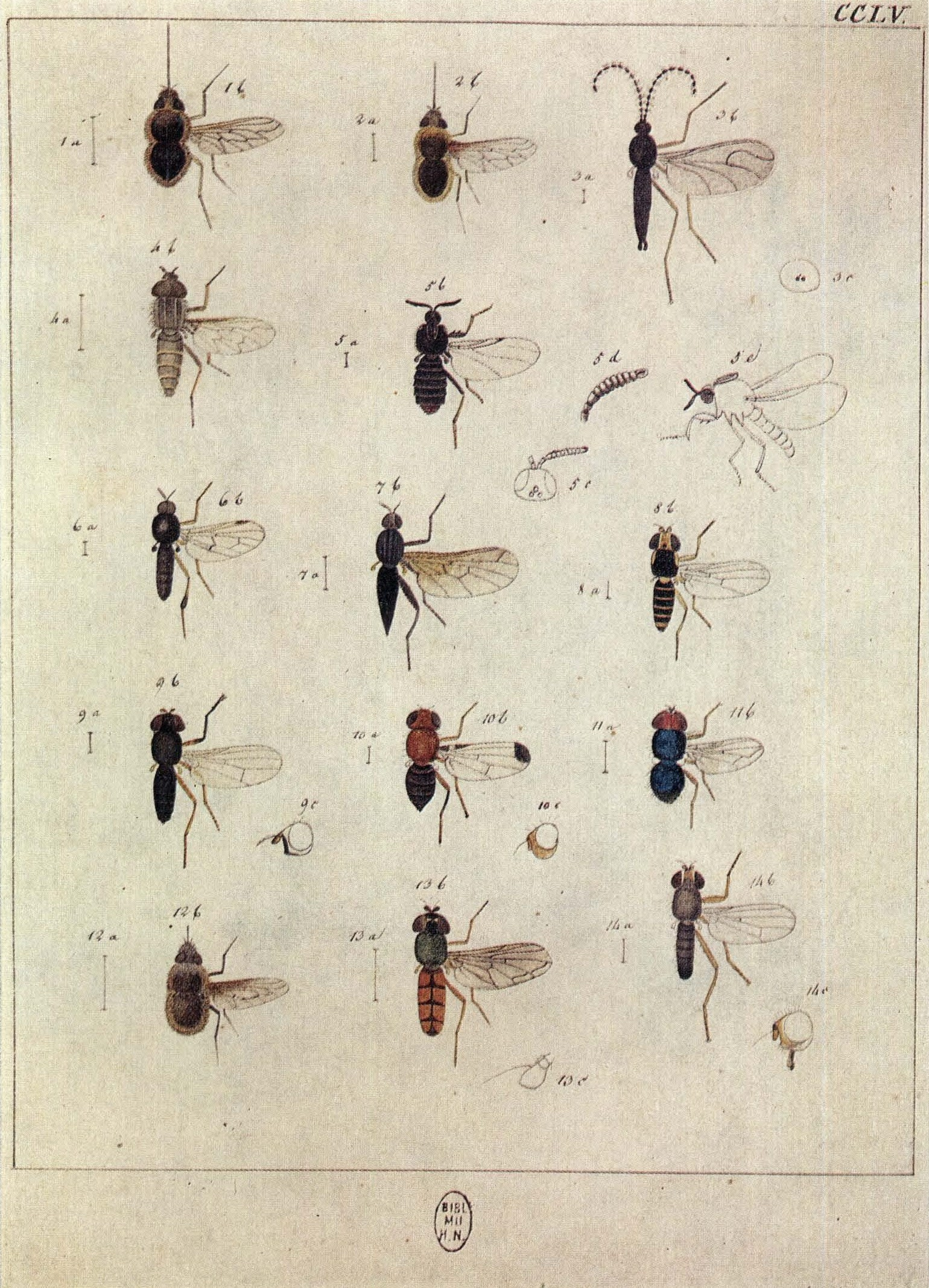
- Pseudopomyza atrimana here in Sciomyza in Europäischen Zweiflügeligen (figure 9)

Scientific classification
- Domain: Eukaryota
- Kingdom: Animalia
- Phylum: Arthropoda
- Class: Insecta
- Order: Diptera
- Superfamily: Nerioidea
- Family: Pseudopomyzidae; McAlpine, 1966

= Pseudopomyzidae =

Subfamily of flies

The family Pseudopomyzidae comprises minute to small (1.7–5.5 mm), dark-coloured acalyptrate flies; formerly they have been treated as a subfamily of Cypselosomatidae

== Biology ==
The biology of pseudopomyzines is very poorly known. Most species are from the New World and Asia. There is only one European species, Pseudopomyza atrimana (Meigen, 1830), which occurs in woodland, and adults have been found to gathering over rotting logs or attracted to the freshly cut and sappy stumps or logs of deciduous trees.

== Genera ==
- Latheticomyia Wheeler, 1956
- Heloclusia Malloch, 1933
- Macalpinella Papp, 2005
- Polypathomyia Krivosheina, 1979
- Pseudopomyza Strobl, 1893
- Pseudopomyzella Hennig, 1969
- Rhinopomyzella Hennig, 1969
- Tenuia Malloch, 1926

== Fossils ==
The fossil record is very poor, with only one specimen of the species, Eopseudopomyza kuehni Hennig, 1971, which has been recorded from Baltic amber.
