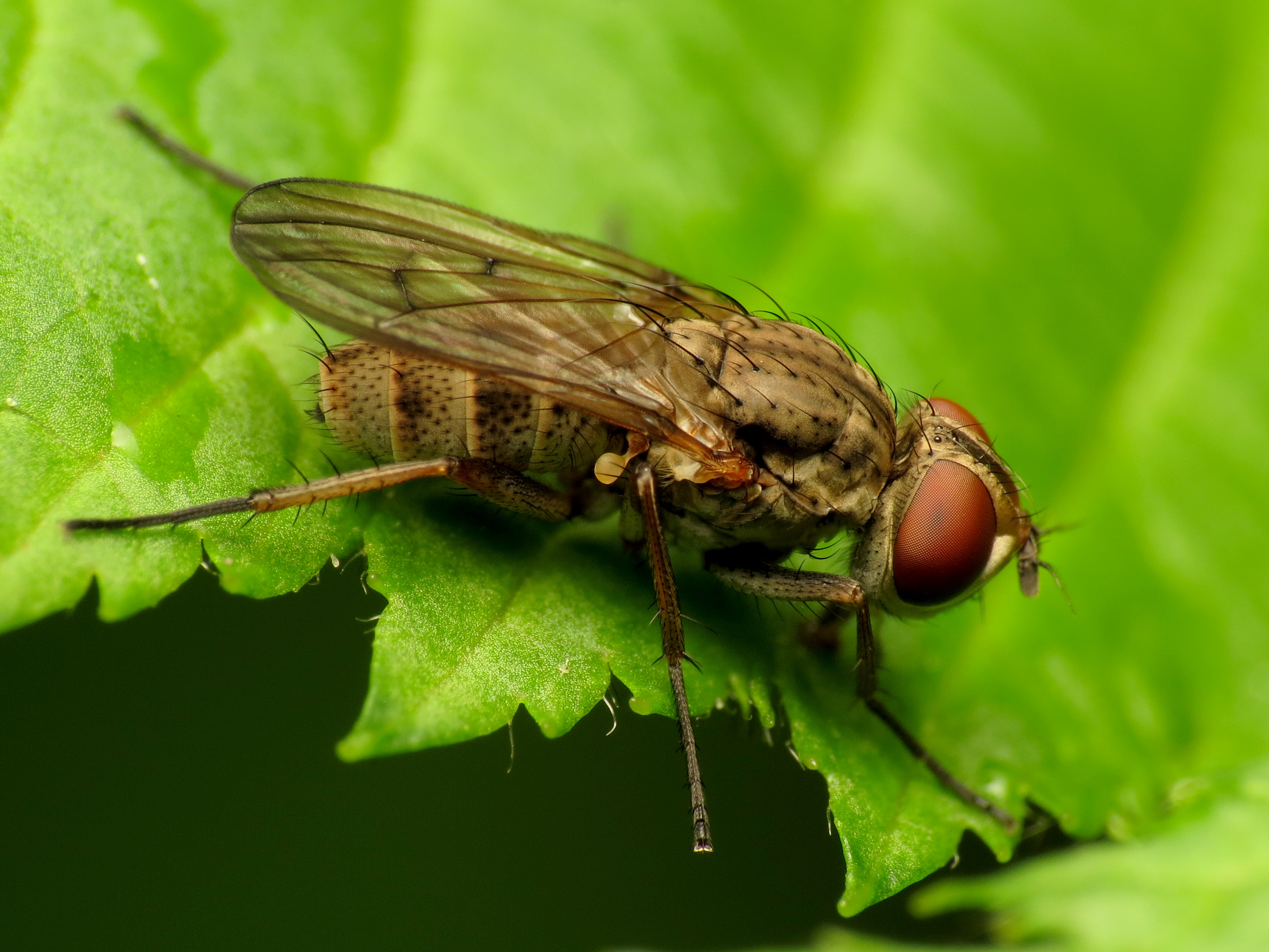

Scientific classification
- Kingdom: Animalia
- Phylum: Arthropoda
- Class: Insecta
- Order: Diptera
- Family: Anthomyiidae
- Subfamily: Anthomyiinae
- Tribe: Hydrophoriini
- Genus: Leucophora; Robineau-Desvoidy, 1830

= Leucophora =

Genus of flies

Leucophora is a genus of root-maggot flies in the family Anthomyiidae. There are at least 60 described species in Leucophora.

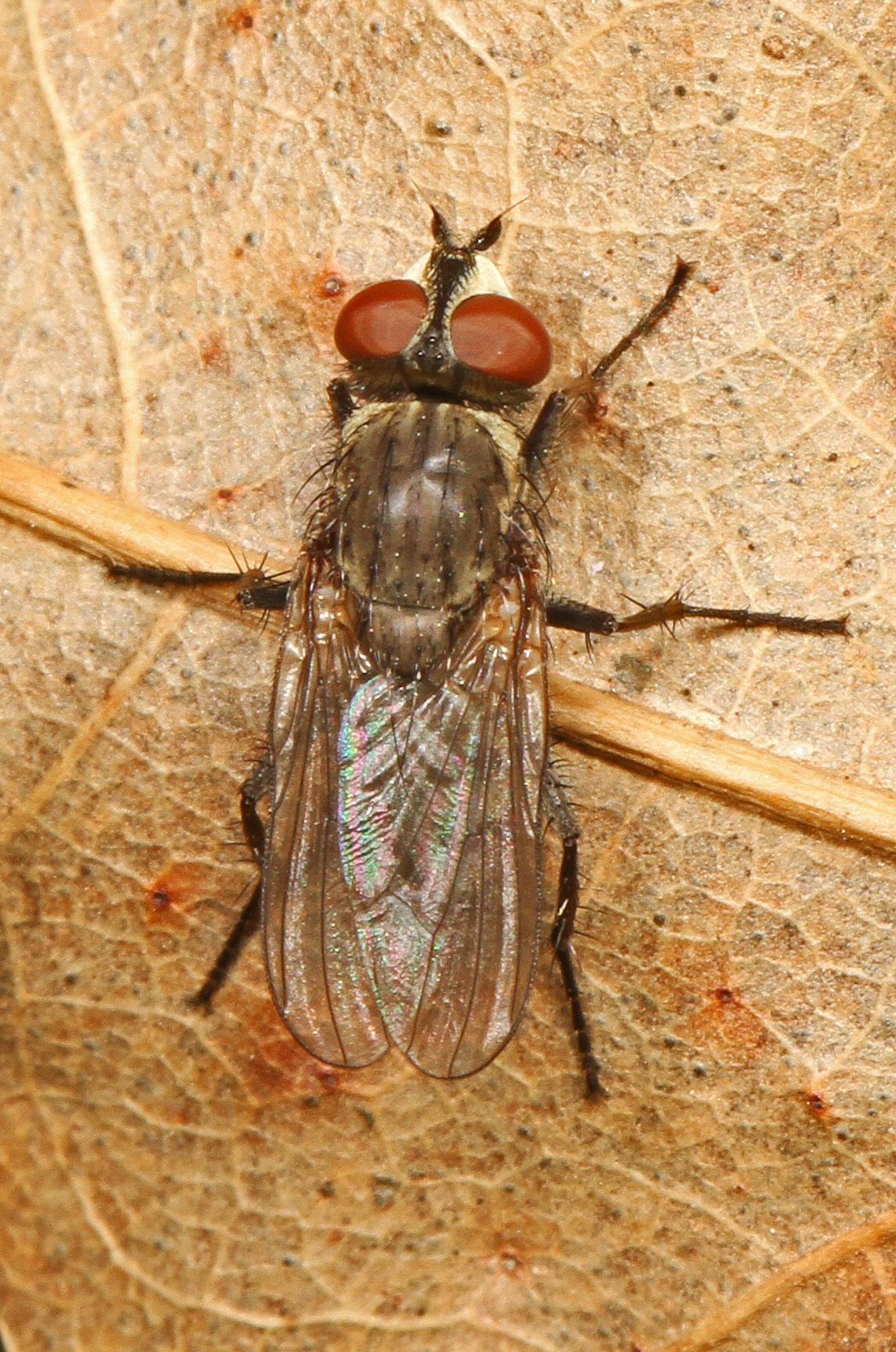

== Species ==
These 66 species belong to the genus Leucophora:

- L. amicula (Séguy, 1928)^{c g}
- L. andicola (Bigot, 1885)^{c g}
- L. annexa Huckett, 1940^{i c g}
- L. apivora (Aldrich, 1919)^{i c g b}
- L. argentina (Malloch, 1934)^{c g}
- L. aurantifrons Fan & Zhong, 1984^{c g}
- L. brevifrons (Stein, 1916)^{c g}
- L. brevis (Huckett, 1940)^{i c g}
- L. canariensis Michelsen, 1985^{c g}
- L. chilensis (Malloch, 1934)^{c g}
- L. cinerea Robineau-Desvoidy, 1830^{i c g}
- L. dasyprosterna Fan & Qian, 1988^{c g}
- L. depressa (Malloch, 1918)^{i c g}
- L. dissimilis (Villeneuve, 1920)^{c g}
- L. dorsalis (Stein, 1916)^{c}
- L. earina Griffiths, 1996^{c g}
- L. elegans Griffiths, 1996^{c g}
- L. flavipes (Stein, 1918)^{c}
- L. floralis Robineau-Desvoidy, 1830^{c g}
- L. fusca Huckett, 1940^{i c g}
- L. gagatea (Robineau-Desvoidy, 1830)^{c g}
- L. grisea Robineau-Desvoidy, 1830^{c g}
- L. grisella Hennig, 1967^{c g}
- L. hangzhouensis Fan, 1988^{c g}
- L. haustellaris Huckett, 1966^{i c g}
- L. hessei (Séguy, 1923)^{c g}
- L. hiemalis Griffiths, 1996^{c g}
- L. inflata (Rondani, 1877)^{c g}
- L. innupta Huckett, 1966^{i c g}
- L. jankowski (Schnabl, 1911)^{c g}
- L. johnsoni (Stein, 1898)^{i c g b}
- L. kirchbergi Hennig, 1967^{c g}
- L. liaoningensis Zhang & Zhang, 1998^{c g}
- L. maculata (Stein, 1898)^{i c g}
- L. maculipennis (Albuquerque, 1953)^{c g}
- L. mallochii (Huckett, 1924^{i c g}
- L. malotiensis Ackland, 1995^{c g}
- L. marylandica (Malloch, 1920)^{i c g b}
- L. miltoparia Griffiths, 1996^{c g}
- L. nigricauda (Bigot, 1885)^{i c g}
- L. nudigrisella Fan, 1986^{c g}
- L. obtusa (Zetterstedt, 1838)^{i c g b}
- L. palmonii Ackland, 1968^{c g}
- L. personata (Collin, 1922)^{c g}
- L. peullae (Malloch, 1934)^{c g}
- L. piliocularis Feng, 1987^{c g}
- L. plumiseta (Malloch, 1934)^{c g}
- L. ponti Hennig, 1967^{c g}
- L. proboscidalis (Malloch, 1917)^{i c g}
- L. rufitibia (Stein, 1918)^{c g}
- L. sericea Robineau-Desvoidy, 1830^{c g}
- L. setosa (Séguy, 1925)^{c g}
- L. shanxiensis Fan & Wang, 1981^{c g}
- L. similis (Schnabl, 1911)^{c g}
- L. siphonina (Bigot, 1883)^{i c g}
- L. sociata (Meigen, 1826)^{i c g}
- L. spalatensis Hennig, 1967^{c g}
- L. sponsa (Meigen, 1826)^{c g}
- L. subrufitibia Ackland, 1995^{c g}
- L. subsponsa Michelsen, 1985^{c g}
- L. subvittata (Malloch, 1934)^{c g}
- L. tavastica (Tiensuu, 1939)^{c g}
- L. tenuirostris (Wulp, 1896)^{i c g}
- L. unilineata (Zetterstedt, 1838)^{i c g b}
- L. unistriata (Zetterstedt, 1838)^{i c g}
- L. xizangensis Fan & Zhong, 1984^{c g}

Data sources: i = ITIS, c = Catalogue of Life, g = GBIF, b = Bugguide.net
