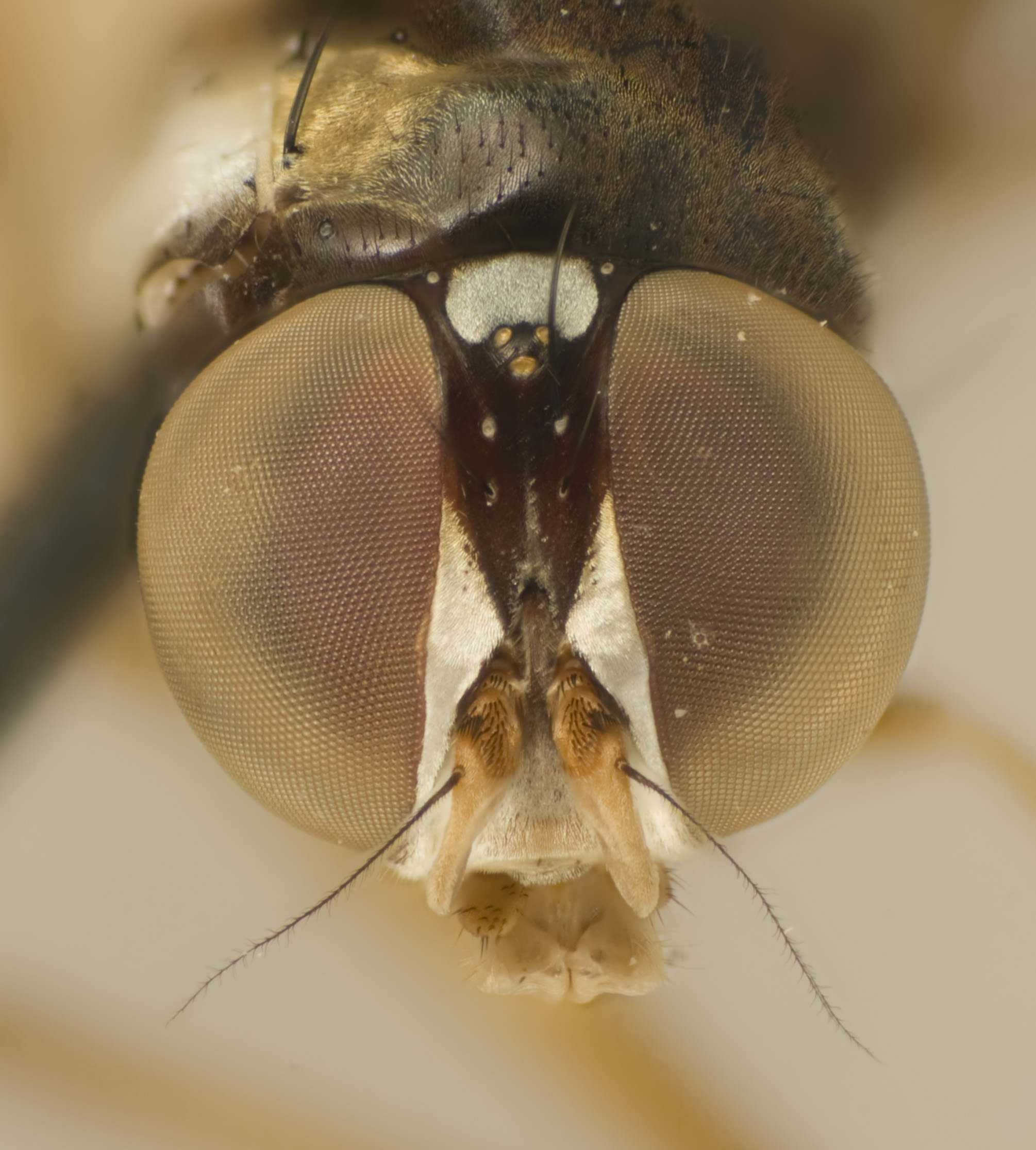
- Head - Neotanypeza abdominalis

Scientific classification
- Kingdom: Animalia
- Phylum: Arthropoda
- Class: Insecta
- Order: Diptera
- Family: Tanypezidae
- Genus: Neotanypeza; Hendel ,1903

Type species
- Tanypeza elegans Wiedemann, 1830

Synonyms
- Polphopeza Enderlein, 1913; Tritanypeza Enderlein, 1936

= Neotanypeza =

Genus of flies

Neotanypeza is a genus of flies in the family Tanypezidae.

== Species ==
- N. abdominalis (Wiedemann, 1830)
- N. apicalis (Wiedemann, 1830)
- N. callitarsis (Rondani, 1850)
- N. claripennis (Schiner, 1868)
- N. cubitofusca (Enderlein, 1936)
- N. dallasi (Shannon, 1927)
- N. dimorpha (Hennig, 1936)
- N. elegans (Wiedemann, 1830)
- N. elegantina (Enderlein, 1913)
- N. flavibasis (Enderlein, 1936)
- N. flavicalx (Enderlein, 1936)
- N. flavitibia Hennig, 1936
- N. flavohirta (Enderlein, 1913)
- N. grandis (Enderlein, 1913)
- N. mexicana (Giglio-Tos, 1893)
- N. montana (Enderlein, 1936)
- N. nigripalpis Hennig, 1936
- N. ochrifemur (Enderlein, 1936)
- N. ornatipes (Bigot, 1886)
- N. pallidipennis (Bigot, 1886)
- N. quadrisetosa (Enderlein, 1913)
- N. rufiventris (Enderlein, 1936)
- N. rutila (Wulp, 1897)
