= Glyphidops =

Scientific classification
- Kingdom: Animalia
- Phylum: Arthropoda
- Class: Insecta
- Order: Diptera
- Family: Neriidae
- Genus: Glyphidops; Enderlein, 1922

Type species
- Nerius filosus Fabricius, 1805

Synonyms
- Chaetomeristes Enderlein, 1922

Genus of flies

Glyphidops is a genus of cactus flies in the family Neriidae.

== Species ==
- Glyphidops bullatus (Enderlein, 1922)
- Glyphidops carrerai Aczél, 1961
- Glyphidops coracinus Sepúlveda, Wolff & Carvalho, 2014
- Glyphidops durus (Cresson, 1926)
- Glyphidops etele Aczél, 1961
- Glyphidops filosus (Fabricius, 1805)
- Glyphidops flavifrons (Bigot, 1886)
- Glyphidops limbatus Enderlein, 1922
- Glyphidops obscurus Hennig, 1937
- Glyphidops pluricellatus (Schiner, 1868)
- Glyphidops rustelatus Sepúlveda, Wolff & Carvalho, 2014
- Glyphidops steyskali Sepúlveda, Wolff & Carvalho, 2014
- Glyphidops xanthopus (Schiner, 1868)
