= Tanypeza longimana =

Scientific classification
- Kingdom: Animalia
- Phylum: Arthropoda
- Class: Insecta
- Order: Diptera
- Family: Tanypezidae
- Genus: Tanypeza
- Species: T. longimana

Binomial name
- Tanypeza longimana Fallén, 1820

Synonyms
- Tanypeza luteipennis Knab and Shannon, 1916

Species of fly

Tanypeza longimana is a species of fly in the family Tanypezidae. It is found in Europe.
