= Turbopsebius diligens =

Scientific classification
- Domain: Eukaryota
- Kingdom: Animalia
- Phylum: Arthropoda
- Class: Insecta
- Order: Diptera
- Family: Acroceridae
- Subfamily: Cyrtinae
- Genus: Turbopsebius
- Species: T. diligens

Binomial name
- Turbopsebius diligens (Osten Sacken, 1877)

Synonyms
- Opsebius diligens Osten Sacken, 1877; Opsebius hyalinus Cole, 1919; Opsebius paucus Osten Sacken, 1877

Species of fly

Turbopsebius diligens is a species of small-headed fly in the family Acroceridae.
