= Villalites =

Villalites Temporal range: Eocene

Scientific classification
- Kingdom: Animalia
- Phylum: Arthropoda
- Clade: Pancrustacea
- Class: Insecta
- Order: Diptera
- Family: Acroceridae
- Subfamily: Cyrtinae
- Genus: †Villalites; Hennig, 1966
- Species: †V. electrica

Binomial name
- †Villalites electrica Hennig, 1966

Extinct genus of flies

Villalites is an extinct genus of small-headed flies in the family Acroceridae. It is known from Baltic amber from the Eocene, though the locality is unknown (possibly Russia). It contains only one species, Villalites electrica.
