= Latheticomyia =

- Latheticomyia peruana

Scientific classification
- Kingdom: Animalia
- Phylum: Arthropoda
- Clade: Pancrustacea
- Class: Insecta
- Order: Diptera
- Family: Pseudopomyzidae
- Genus: Latheticomyia; Wheeler, 1956

Type species
- Latheticomyia tricolor Wheeler, 1956

Genus of flies

Latheticomyia is a genus of flies in the family Pseudopomyzidae.

== Species ==
- Latheticomyia infumata Wheeler, 1956
- Latheticomyia lineata Wheeler, 1956
- Latheticomyia longiterebra Hennig, 1969
- Latheticomyia peruana Marques & Rafael, 2016
- Latheticomyia rotundicornis Hennig, 1969
- Latheticomyia tricolor Wheeler, 1956
- Latheticomyia xantha Marques & Rafael, 2016
