= Telostylus =

Scientific classification
- Kingdom: Animalia
- Phylum: Arthropoda
- Clade: Pancrustacea
- Class: Insecta
- Order: Diptera
- Family: Neriidae
- Genus: Telostylus; Bigot, 1859

Type species
- Telostylus binotatus Bigot, 1859

Genus of flies

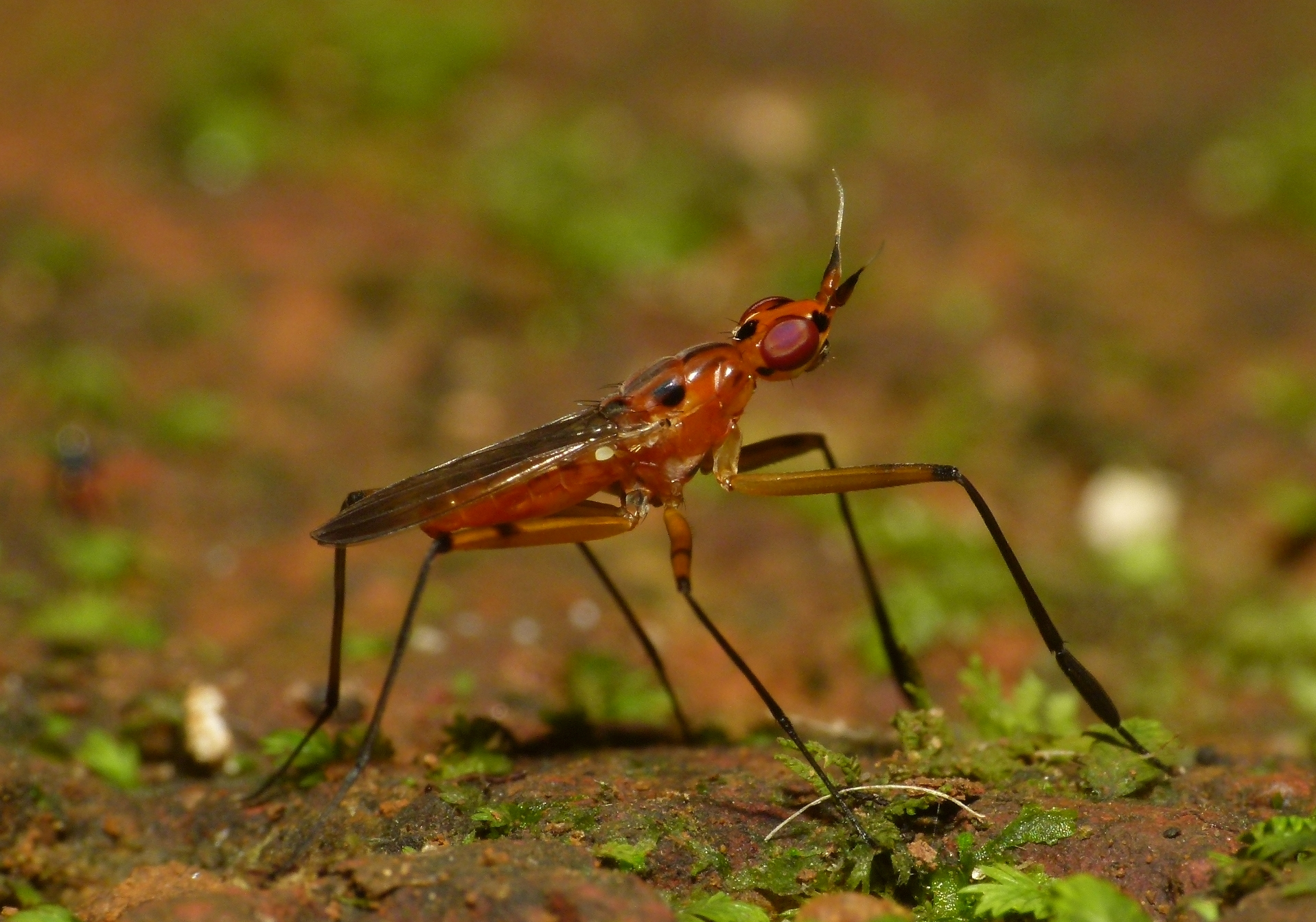
Telostylus Diptera

Telostylus is a genus of flies in the family Neriidae.

== Species ==
- Telostylus babiensis Meijere, 1916
- Telostylus binotatus Bigot, 1859
- Telostylus decemnotatus Hendel, 1913
- Telostylus inversus Hennig, 1937
- Telostylus latibrachium Enderlein, 1922
- Telostylus maccus Osten Sacken, 1882
- Telostylus marshalli Sepúlveda & Carvalho, 2019
- Telostylus niger Bezzi, 1914
- Telostylus philippinensis Cresson, 1926
- Telostylus remipes (Walker, 1860)
- Telostylus trilineatus Meijere, 1910
- Telostylus whitmorei Sepúlveda & Carvalho, 2019
