= Rhinopomyzella =

Scientific classification
- Kingdom: Animalia
- Phylum: Arthropoda
- Class: Insecta
- Order: Diptera
- Family: Pseudopomyzidae
- Genus: Rhinopomyzella; Hennig, 1969

Type species
- Rhinopomyzella nigrimana Hennig, 1969

Genus of flies

Rhinopomyzella is a genus of flies in the family Pseudopomyzidae.

== Distribution ==
Jamaica, Ecuador, Brazil

== Species ==
- Rhinopomyzella albimanus Hennig, 1969
- Rhinopomyzella nigrimana Hennig, 1969
