= Antillonerius =

Scientific classification
- Kingdom: Animalia
- Phylum: Arthropoda
- Class: Insecta
- Order: Diptera
- Family: Neriidae
- Genus: Antillonerius; Hennig, 1937

Type species
- Nerius solitarius Johnson, 1919

Synonyms
- Antillonereis Neave, 1950; Imrenerius Aczél, 1961

Genus of flies

Antillonerius is a genus of flies in the family Neriidae.

== Species ==
- Antillonerius bistriatus (Williston, 1896)
- Antillonerius cinereus (Röder, 1885)
