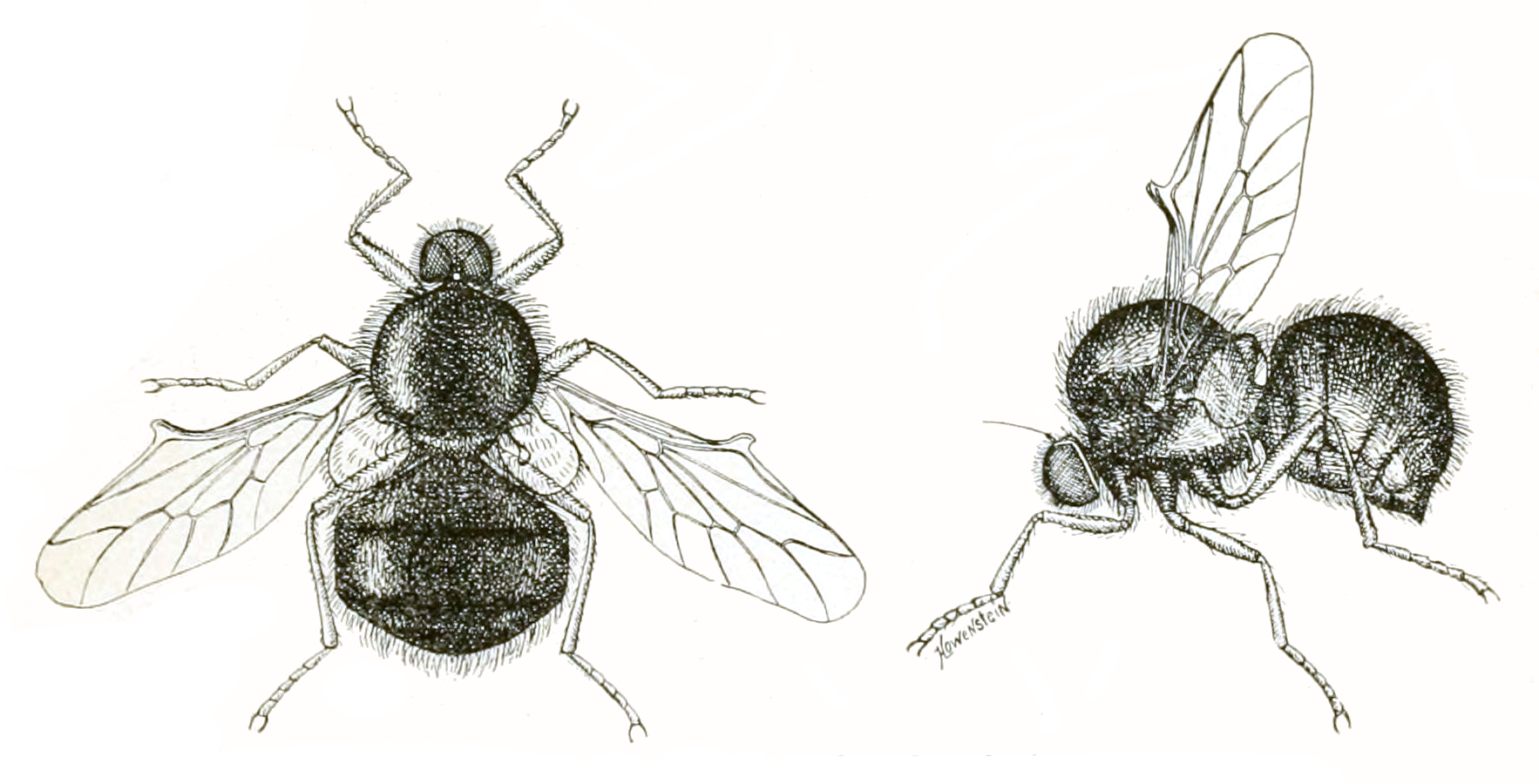
- T. sulphuripes

Scientific classification
- Domain: Eukaryota
- Kingdom: Animalia
- Phylum: Arthropoda
- Class: Insecta
- Order: Diptera
- Family: Acroceridae
- Genus: Turbopsebius
- Species: T. sulphuripes

Binomial name
- Turbopsebius sulphuripes (Loew, 1869)

Synonyms
- Opsebius agelenae Melander, 1902; Opsebius pterodontinus Osten Sacken, 1883; Opsebius sulphuripes Loew, 1869

= Turbopsebius sulphuripes =

Species of fly

Turbopsebius sulphuripes is a species of small-headed fly in the family Acroceridae.
