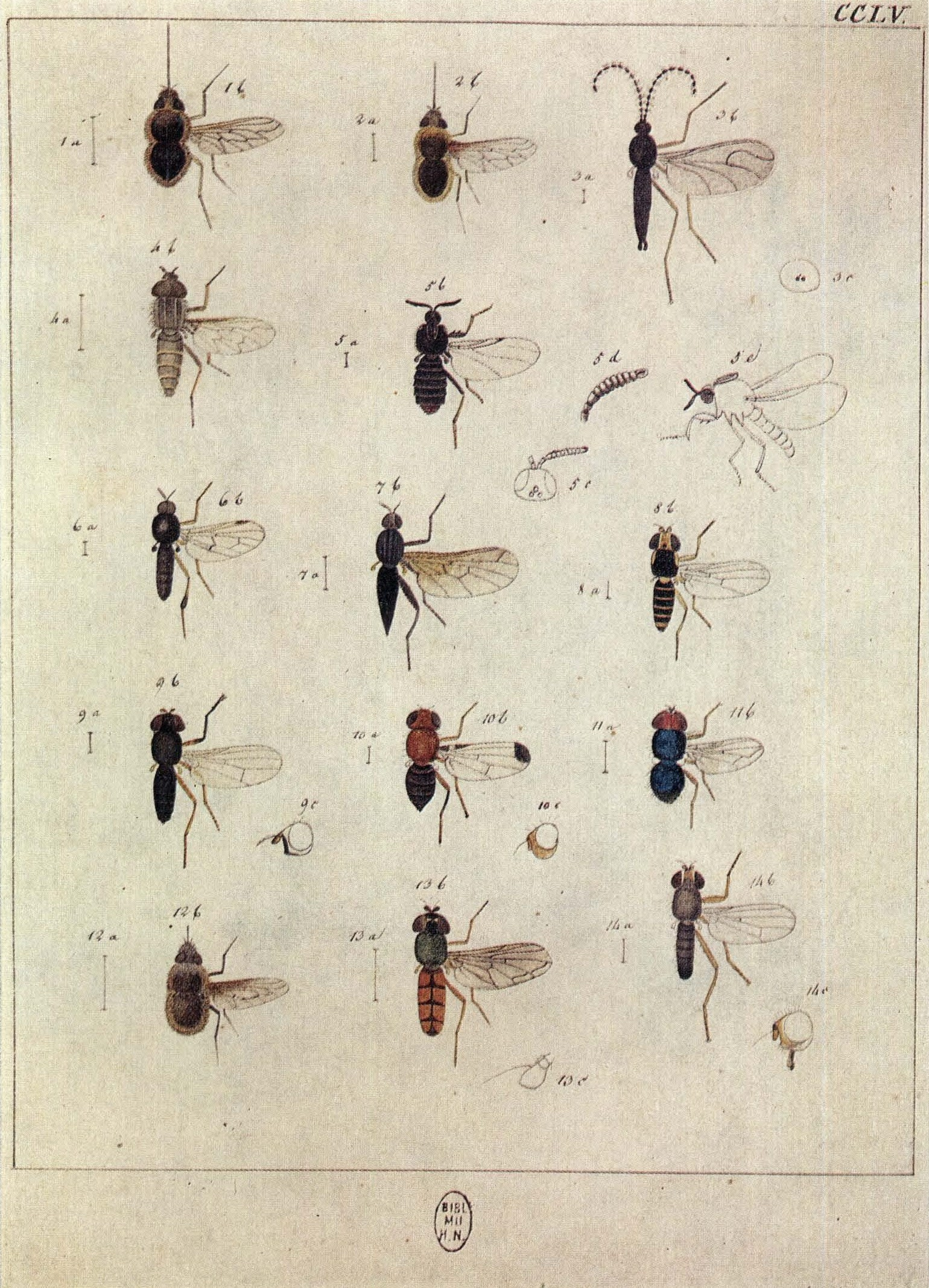

Scientific classification
- Kingdom: Animalia
- Phylum: Arthropoda
- Class: Insecta
- Order: Diptera
- Family: Pseudopomyzidae
- Genus: Pseudopomyza
- Species: P. atrimana

Binomial name
- Pseudopomyza atrimana (Meigen, 1830)

Synonyms
- Opomyza atrimana Meigen, 1830; Pseudopomyza nitidissima Strobl, 1893

= Pseudopomyza atrimana =

Species of fly

Pseudopomyza atrimana, is a species of fly in the family Pseudopomyzidae.

== Distribution ==
Europe
