= Eoloxozus =

Scientific classification
- Kingdom: Animalia
- Phylum: Arthropoda
- Class: Insecta
- Order: Diptera
- Family: Neriidae
- Genus: Eoloxozus; Aczél, 1961

Type species
- Eoloxozus sabroskyi Aczél, 1961

Genus of flies

Eoloxozus is a genus of flies in the family Neriidae.

== Species ==
- Eoloxozus sabroskyi Aczél, 1961
