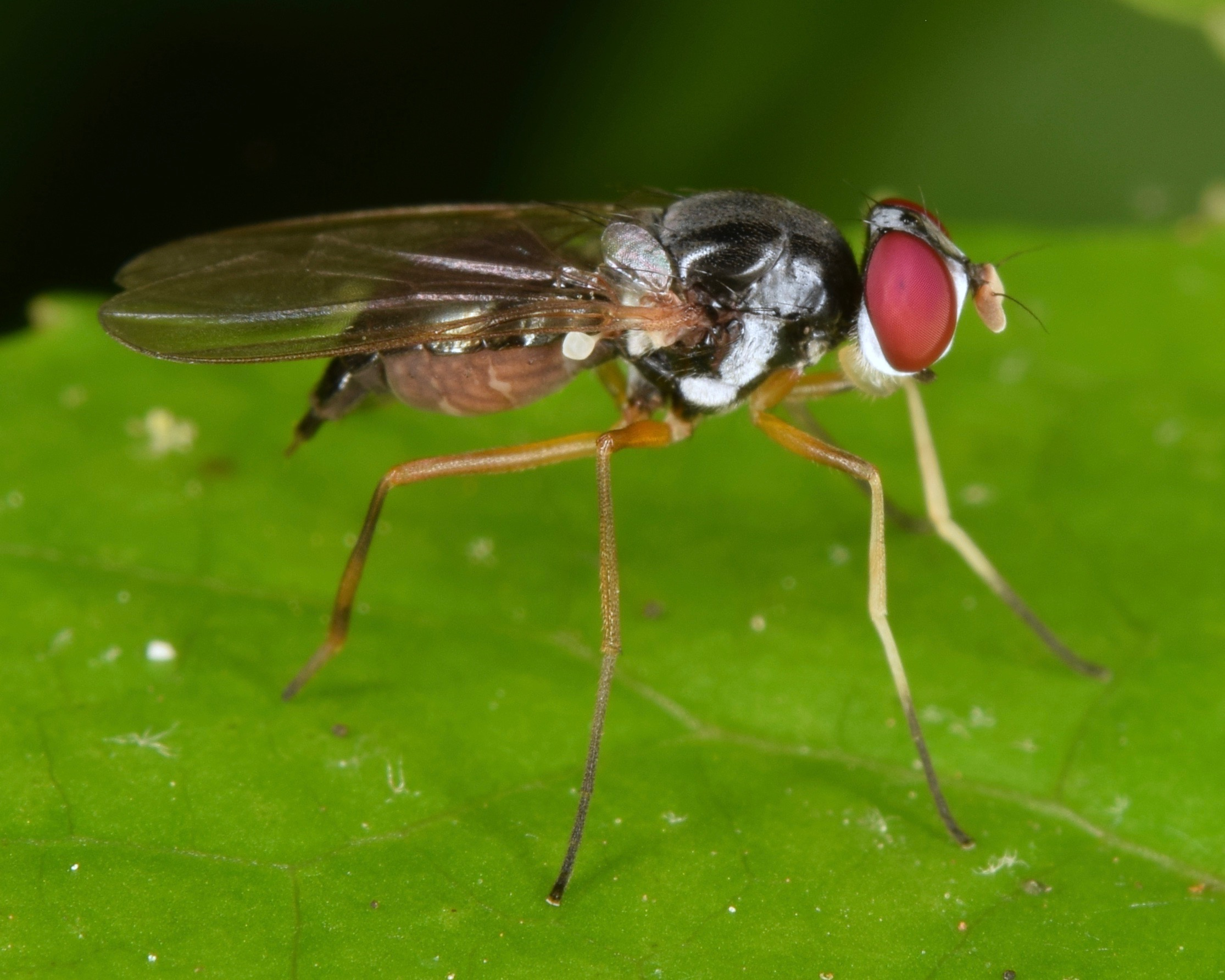

Scientific classification
- Kingdom: Animalia
- Phylum: Arthropoda
- Class: Insecta
- Order: Diptera
- Family: Tanypezidae
- Genus: Tanypeza; Fallén, 1820

Type species
- Tanypeza longimana Fallén, 1820

= Tanypeza =

Genus of flies

Tanypeza is a genus of flies in the family Tanypezidae.

== Species ==
- Tanypeza longimana Fallén, 1820
- Tanypeza picticornis Knab & Shannon, 1916
