= Indonesicesa =

Scientific classification
- Kingdom: Animalia
- Phylum: Arthropoda
- Class: Insecta
- Order: Diptera
- Family: Neriidae
- Genus: Indonesicesa; Koçak & Kemal, 2009

Type species
- Nerius annulipes Doleschall, 1857

Synonyms
- Rhoptrum Enderlein, 1922

Genus of flies

Indonesicesa is a genus of flies in the family Neriidae.

== Species ==
- Indonesicesa annulipes (Doleschall, 1857)
- Indonesicesa lieftincki (Aczél, 1954)
- Indonesicesa mantoides (Walker, 1861)
