= Odontoscelia =

Scientific classification
- Kingdom: Animalia
- Phylum: Arthropoda
- Class: Insecta
- Order: Diptera
- Family: Neriidae
- Genus: Odontoscelia; Enderlein, 1922

Type species
- Nerius flavipes Wiedemann, 1830

Genus of flies

Odontoscelia is a genus of cactus flies in the family Neriidae.

== Species ==
- Odontoscelia flavipes (Wiedemann, 1830)
- Odontoscelia marginella (Rondani, 1848)
