= Derocephalus =

Scientific classification
- Kingdom: Animalia
- Phylum: Arthropoda
- Clade: Pancrustacea
- Class: Insecta
- Order: Diptera
- Family: Neriidae
- Genus: Derocephalus; Enderlein, 1922

Type species
- Derocephalus angusticollis Enderlein, 1922

Genus of flies

Derocephalus is a genus of cactus flies in the family Neriidae.

== Distribution ==
Australia.

== Species ==
- Derocephalus angusticollis Enderlein, 1922
