= Leucophora johnsoni =

Scientific classification
- Kingdom: Animalia
- Phylum: Arthropoda
- Class: Insecta
- Order: Diptera
- Family: Anthomyiidae
- Subfamily: Anthomyiinae
- Tribe: Hydrophoriini
- Genus: Leucophora
- Species: L. johnsoni

Binomial name
- Leucophora johnsoni (Stein, 1898)

Synonyms
- Hylemyia johnsoni Stein, 1898

Species of fly

Leucophora johnsoni is a species of root-maggot flies in the family Anthomyiidae.
