= Nerius =

Scientific classification
- Kingdom: Animalia
- Phylum: Arthropoda
- Class: Insecta
- Order: Diptera
- Family: Neriidae
- Genus: Nerius; Fabricius, 1805

Type species
- Nerius pilifer Fabricius, 1805

Synonyms
- Neria Robineau-Desvoidy, 1830; Brachantichir Enderlein, 1922

Genus of flies

Nerius is a genus of cactus flies in the family Neriidae.

== Species ==
- Nerius brachantichirinus Hennig, 1937
- Nerius brunneus Macquart, 1835
- Nerius czernyi Aczél, 1961
- Nerius femoratus Coquillett, 1898
- Nerius lanei Aczél, 1961
- Nerius laticornis Hennig, 1937
- Nerius ochraceus Schiner, 1868
- Nerius pilifer Fabricius, 1805
- Nerius plurivittatus Bigot, 1886
- Nerius rubescens Macquart, 1843
- Nerius striatus Doleschall, 1856
- Nerius terebrans Hennig, 1937
- Nerius terebratus Enderlein, 1922
- Nerius nigrofuscus Czerny, 1932
- Nerius purpusianus Enderlein, 1922
