= Polypathomyia =

Scientific classification
- Kingdom: Animalia
- Phylum: Arthropoda
- Class: Insecta
- Order: Diptera
- Family: Pseudopomyzidae
- Genus: Polypathomyia; Krivosheina, 1979

Type species
- Polypathomyia stackelbergi Krivosheina, 1979

Genus of flies

Polypathomyia is a genus of flies in the family Pseudopomyzidae.

== Distribution ==
Japan.

== Species ==
- Polypathomyia stackelbergi Krivosheina, 1979
