= Holops =

Scientific classification
- Kingdom: Animalia
- Phylum: Arthropoda
- Clade: Pancrustacea
- Class: Insecta
- Order: Diptera
- Family: Acroceridae
- Subfamily: Cyrtinae
- Genus: Holops; Philippi, 1865

Type species
- Holops cyaneus Philippi, 1865

Genus of flies

Holops is a genus of small-headed flies in the family Acroceridae. It is endemic to Chile.

== Species ==
The genus includes six species:

- Holops anarayae Barahona-Segovia, 2021
- Holops cyaneus Philippi, 1865
- Holops frauenfeldii Schiner, 1868
- Holops grezi Barahona-Segovia, 2021
- Holops pullomen Barahona-Segovia, 2021
- Holops virens Bigot, 1878
