= Tenuia =

Scientific classification
- Kingdom: Animalia
- Phylum: Arthropoda
- Class: Insecta
- Order: Diptera
- Family: Pseudopomyzidae
- Genus: Tenuia; Malloch, 1926

Type species
- Tenuia nigripes Malloch, 1926

Genus of flies

Tenuia is a genus of flies in the family Pseudopomyzidae.

== Distribution ==
Russia, Philippines.

== Species ==
- Tenuia nigripes Malloch, 1926
- Tenuia smirnovi Shatalkin, 1995
