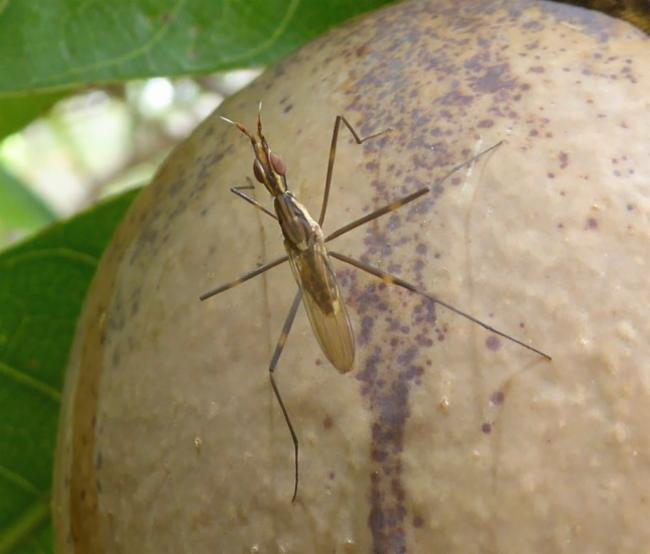

Scientific classification
- Kingdom: Animalia
- Phylum: Arthropoda
- Class: Insecta
- Order: Diptera
- Family: Neriidae
- Genus: Telostylinus
- Species: T. lineolatus

Binomial name
- Telostylinus lineolatus (Wiedemann, 1830)

Synonyms
- Nerius lineolatus Wiedemann, 1830

= Telostylinus lineolatus =

Species of fly

Telostylinus lineolatus is a species of fly from the genus Telostylinus. The species was originally described by Christian Rudolph Wilhelm Wiedemann in 1830

== Distribution ==
Widespread Oriental and Australasian.
