= Eoneria =

Scientific classification
- Kingdom: Animalia
- Phylum: Arthropoda
- Class: Insecta
- Order: Diptera
- Family: Neriidae
- Genus: Eoneria; Aczél, 1951

Type species
- Eoneria blanchardi Aczél, 1951

Genus of flies

Eoneria is a genus of flies in the family Neriidae.

== Species ==
- Eoneria blanchardi 1951, 1961
- Eoneria maldonadoi Aczél, 1961
