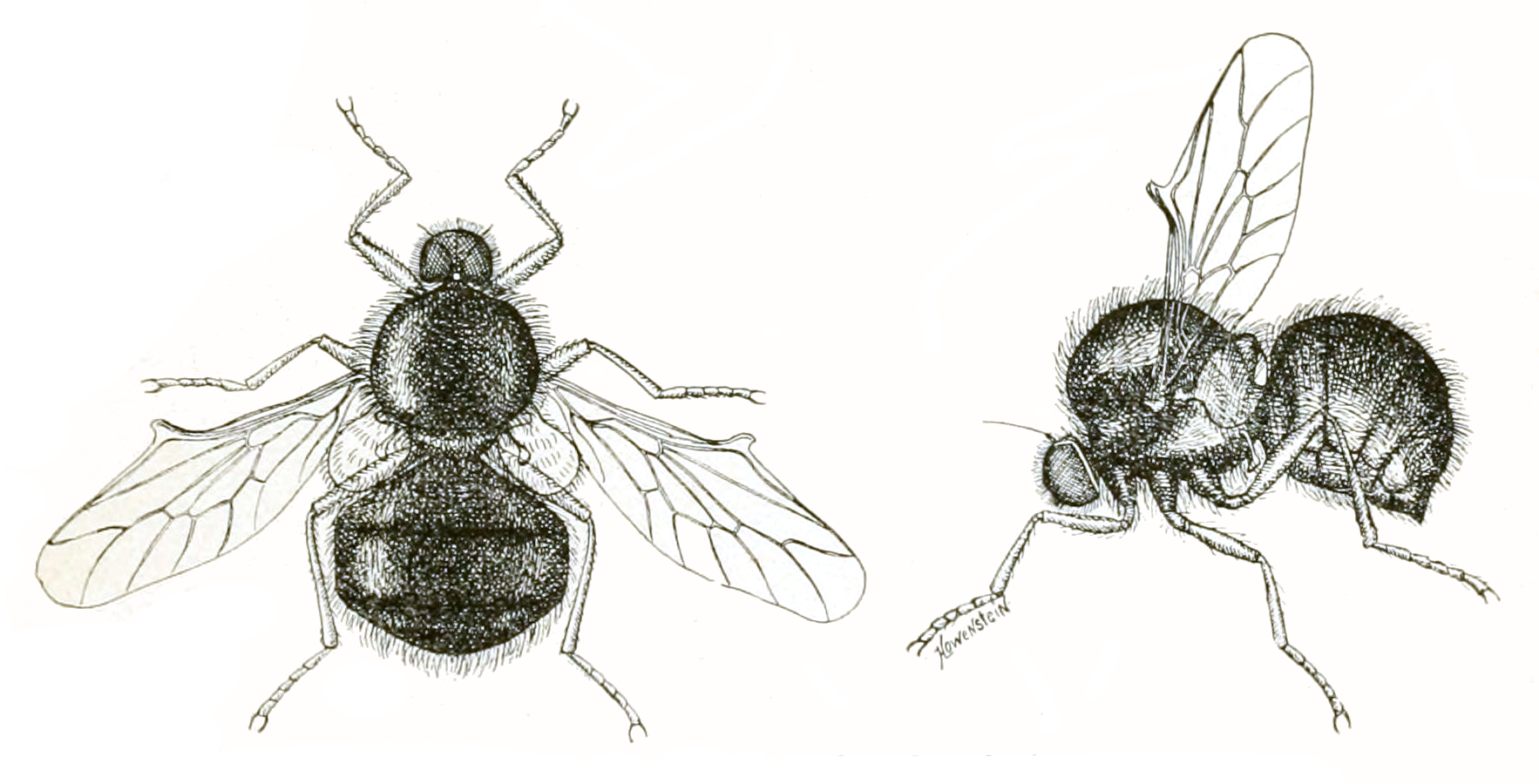
- T. sulphuripes

Scientific classification
- Domain: Eukaryota
- Kingdom: Animalia
- Phylum: Arthropoda
- Class: Insecta
- Order: Diptera
- Family: Acroceridae
- Subfamily: Cyrtinae
- Genus: Turbopsebius; Schlinger, 1972

Type species
- Opsebius diligens Osten Sacken, 1877

= Turbopsebius =

Genus of flies

Turbopsebius is a genus of small-headed flies in the family Acroceridae. There are about four described species in Turbopsebius.

== Species ==
These four species belong to the genus Turbopsebius:

- Turbopsebius brunnipennis (Sabrosky, 1948)^{c g}
- Turbopsebius diligens (Osten Sacken, 1877)^{i c g b}
- Turbopsebius gagatinus (Loew, 1866)^{c g}
- Turbopsebius sulphuripes (Loew, 1869)^{i c g b}

Data sources: i = ITIS, c = Catalogue of Life, g = GBIF, b = Bugguide.net
