= Leucophora marylandica =

Scientific classification
- Domain: Eukaryota
- Kingdom: Animalia
- Phylum: Arthropoda
- Class: Insecta
- Order: Diptera
- Family: Anthomyiidae
- Subfamily: Anthomyiinae
- Tribe: Hydrophoriini
- Genus: Leucophora
- Species: L. marylandica

Binomial name
- Leucophora marylandica (Malloch, 1920)

Synonyms
- Hammomyia marylandica Malloch, 1920

Species of insect

Leucophora marylandica is a species of root-maggot flies in the family Anthomyiidae.
