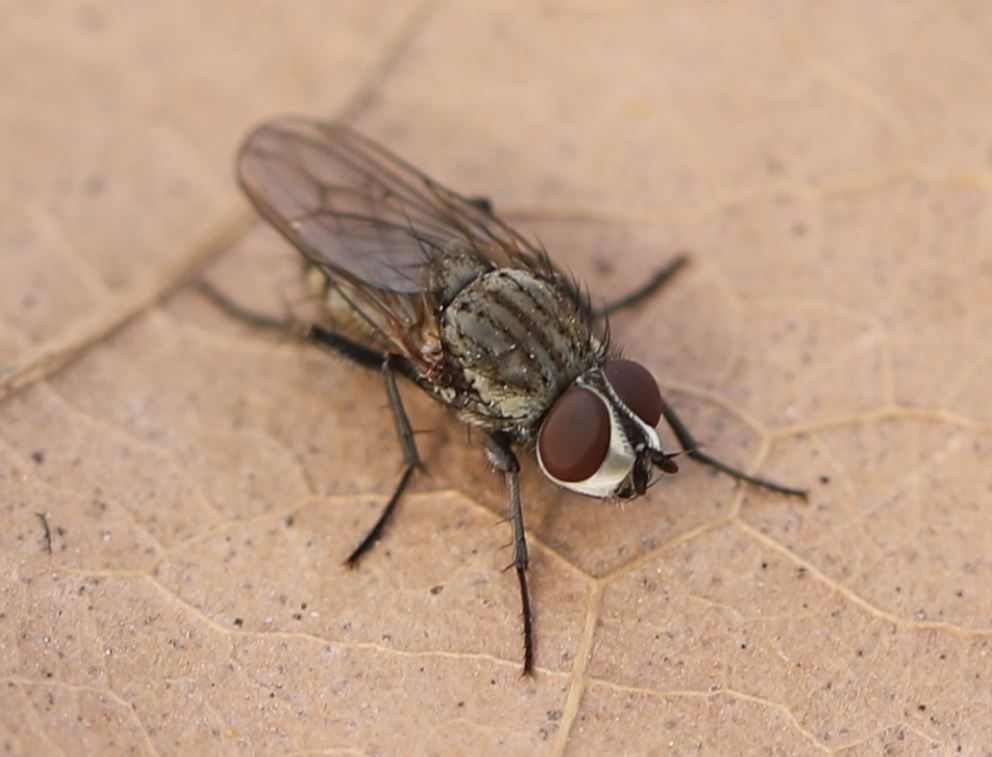

Scientific classification
- Domain: Eukaryota
- Kingdom: Animalia
- Phylum: Arthropoda
- Class: Insecta
- Order: Diptera
- Family: Anthomyiidae
- Subfamily: Anthomyiinae
- Tribe: Hydrophoriini
- Genus: Leucophora
- Species: L. obtusa

Binomial name
- Leucophora obtusa (Zetterstedt, 1838)

Synonyms
- Anthomyza obtusa Zetterstedt, 1838

= Leucophora obtusa =

Species of fly

Leucophora obtusa is a species of root-maggot flies in the family Anthomyiidae.
