= Loxozus =

Scientific classification
- Kingdom: Animalia
- Phylum: Arthropoda
- Clade: Pancrustacea
- Class: Insecta
- Order: Diptera
- Family: Neriidae
- Genus: Loxozus; Enderlein, 1922

Type species
- Loxozus clavicornis Enderlein, 1922

Genus of flies

Loxozus is a genus of cactus flies in the family Neriidae.

== Distribution ==
Colombia, Bolivia.

== Species ==
- Loxozus clavicornis Enderlein, 1922
