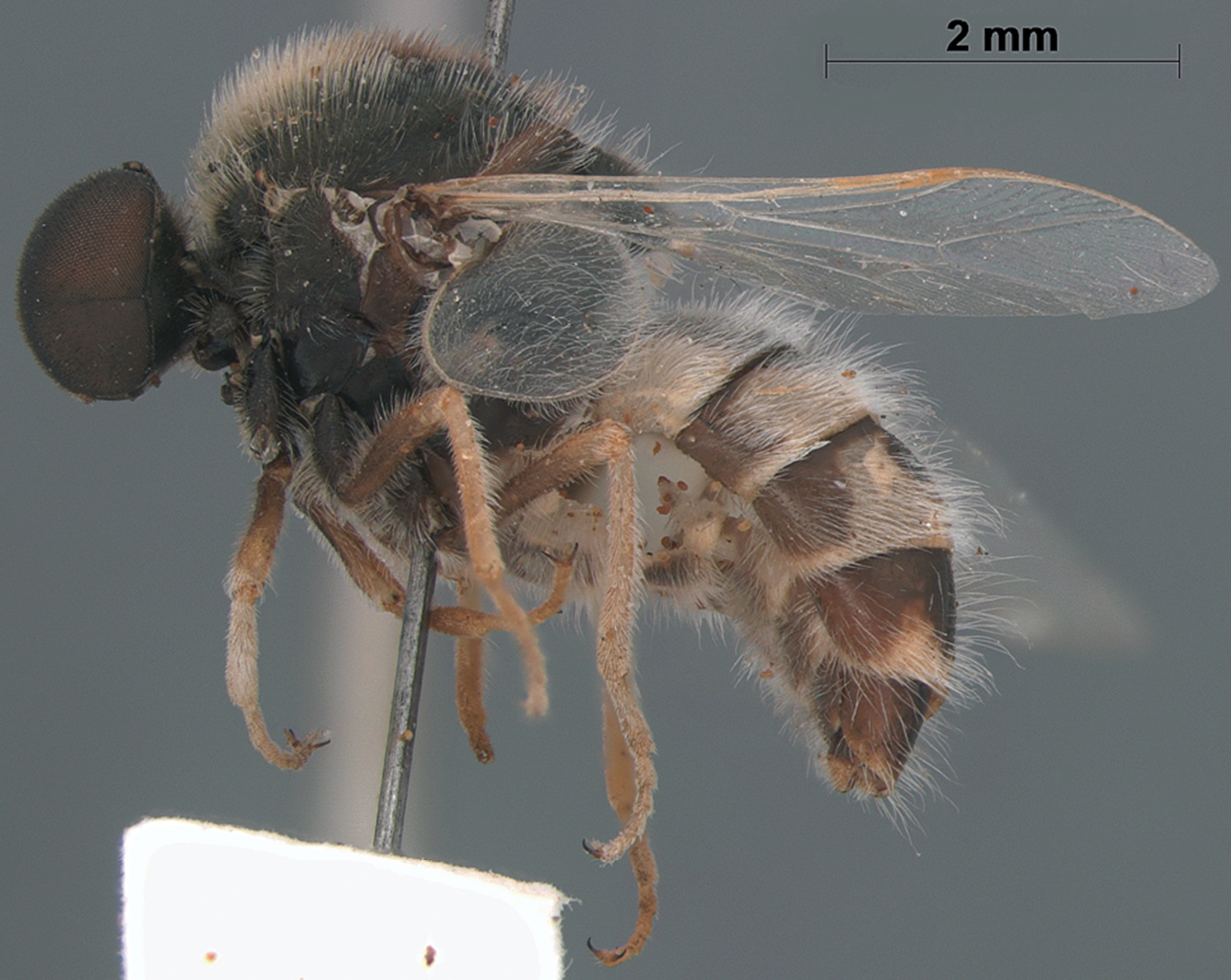
- Sabroskya ogcodoides male

Scientific classification
- Kingdom: Animalia
- Phylum: Arthropoda
- Class: Insecta
- Order: Diptera
- Family: Acroceridae
- Subfamily: Cyrtinae
- Genus: Sabroskya; Schlinger, 1960

Type species
- Sabroskya ogcodoides Schlinger, 1960

= Sabroskya =

Genus of flies

Sabroskya is a genus of small-headed flies in the family Acroceridae. It is known from South Africa and Malawi. It is named after the American entomologist Curtis Williams Sabrosky.

== Species ==
Three species are included in the genus:

- Sabroskya ogcodoides Schlinger, 1960 – South Africa: Eastern Cape
- Sabroskya palpalis Barraclough, 1984 – South Africa: KwaZulu-Natal
- Sabroskya schlingeri Winterton & Gillung, 2012 – Malawi: Northern Region
