= Heloclusia =

Scientific classification
- Kingdom: Animalia
- Phylum: Arthropoda
- Class: Insecta
- Order: Diptera
- Family: Pseudopomyzidae
- Genus: Heloclusia; Malloch, 1933

Genus of flies

Heloclusia is a genus of flies in the family Pseudopomyzidae.

== Distribution ==
Chile, Argentina.

== Species ==
- Heloclusia imperfecta Malloch, 1933
