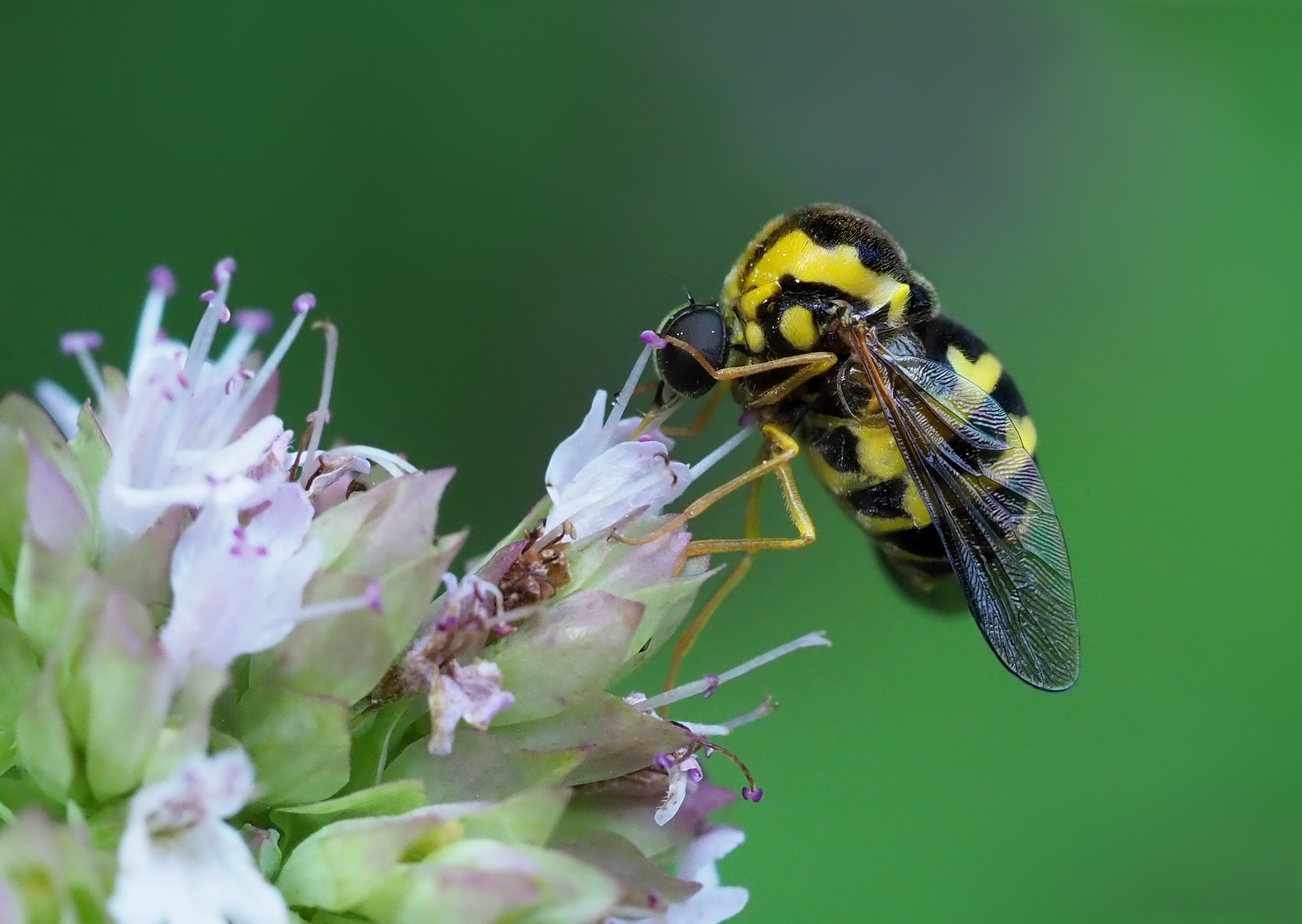
- Cyrtus gibbus

Scientific classification
- Domain: Eukaryota
- Kingdom: Animalia
- Phylum: Arthropoda
- Class: Insecta
- Order: Diptera
- Family: Acroceridae
- Subfamily: Cyrtinae; Newman, 1834

Genera
- See text

= Cyrtinae =

Subfamily of flies

Cyrtinae is a subfamily of the Acroceridae (small-headed flies). Their larvae are endoparasites of araneomorph spiders in the subgroup Entelegynae.

== Genera ==
The subfamily includes twelve extant genera and two extinct:

- Asopsebius Nartshuk, 1982
- †Cyrtinella Gillung & Winterton, 2017
- Cyrtus Latreille, 1796
- Hadrogaster Schlinger, 1972
- Holops Philippi, 1865
- Meruia Sabrosky, 1950
- Nipponcyrtus Schlinger, 1972
- Opsebius Costa, 1856
- Paracyrtus Schlinger, 1972
- Sabroskya Schlinger, 1960
- Subcyrtus Brunetti, 1926
- Turbopsebius Schlinger, 1972
- †Villalites Hennig, 1966
- Villalus Cole, 1918
