= Protonerius =

Scientific classification
- Kingdom: Animalia
- Phylum: Arthropoda
- Class: Insecta
- Order: Diptera
- Family: Neriidae
- Genus: Protonerius; Meijere, 1924

Type species
- Nerius guttipennis Meijere, 1924

Genus of flies

Protonerius is a genus of flies in the family Neriidae.

== Species ==
- Protonerius opacus Sepúlveda & Marinoni, 2021
- Protonerius guttipennis (Meijere, 1921)
