= Stypocladius =

Scientific classification
- Kingdom: Animalia
- Phylum: Arthropoda
- Class: Insecta
- Order: Diptera
- Family: Neriidae
- Genus: Stypocladius; Enderlein, 1922

Type species
- Nerius appendiculatus Hendel, 1913

Genus of flies

Stypocladius is a genus of flies in the family Neriidae.

== Distribution ==
Taiwan, Japan.

== Species ==
- Stypocladius appendiculatus (Hendel, 1913)
