= Derocephalus angusticollis =

Scientific classification
- Kingdom: Animalia
- Phylum: Arthropoda
- Clade: Pancrustacea
- Class: Insecta
- Order: Diptera
- Family: Neriidae
- Genus: Derocephalus
- Species: D. angusticollis

Binomial name
- Derocephalus angusticollis Enderlein, 1922

Synonyms
- Telostylinus bivittatus Cresson, 1926

Species of fly

Derocephalus angusticollis is a fly in the family Neriidae. They are typically found on the east coast of Australia near rotting vegetation. Aggregating on the rotting bark of trees such as Acacia longifolia and other trees in New South Wales and southern Queensland. Derocephalus angusticollis flies found in the wild have accelerated speeds of development and age of mortality when compared to those in captivity. One characteristic of the neriid fly is that it demonstrates sexual dimorphism. Males have a larger build as well as exaggerated physical characteristics such as wider heads and longer limbs. Certain phenotypic characteristics are dependent on the diet of the parents.

Derocephalus angusticollis practices polyandrous mating behavior. Males take part in the practice of mate guarding where they use their legs to keep hold of the female during copulation and to push competing males away. Sexual conflict can be found in this fly as females have coiled oviducts that lead to their spermathecae. In order for the male to reach the spermathecae to deposit their sperm, antagonistic coevolution of the males having a flexible aedeagus occurred.

== Description ==
Like other flies within Neriidae, D. angusticollis has characteristic dorsocentral bristles located for the most part on their thorax as an identification marker. The number of pairs of bristles varies within the genus; D. angusticollis usually has two pairs instead of one pair. Variation has been observed on parts other than the thorax. Certain flies had a lack of bristles or fewer than the average due to genetic factors and environmental factors, such as the quality of diet.

=== Sexual dimorphism ===
Derocephalus angusticollis flies demonstrated sexual dimorphism with males often presenting as larger and with more exaggerated traits than females. Males, in particular, tend to have elongated heads, antennae, and legs than their female counterparts. The extent of the dimorphism is dependent on genetics as well as parental diet as described below. The exaggerated features of males may assist them in male-male combat.

== Diet ==
The flies' diet consists of rotting vegetation, bark, mold, and sap. One particular study found that a nutrient-rich diet for this fly was one of a higher protein and carbohydrate content. The quality of the diets of parents, in particular, has been found to have effects on the phenotype of the offspring. Mothers with nutrient-rich diets were found to lay larger eggs that also developed faster. Likewise, fathers that were raised on high-nutrient diets had larger adult offspring, improving the overall fitness of the offspring.

Researchers have demonstrated that early differences in nutrient content can impact D. angusticollis's ability to age successfully. Male early life condition was manipulated by varying nutrient content of larval diet, and the interactions that adult males had later on in life with other adult males were also intentionally controlled and manipulated in the experiment. Males fed with high nutrient levels as larvae were able to develop more quickly, and reached their reproductive peak earlier on. Males with a nutrient-rich diet also experienced more rapid reproductive aging and ultimately died sooner than their poorly fed counterparts. High nutrient condition early in life is associated with rapid aging even in the absence of male-male conflicts that damage one's longevity.

The effect of the quality of food having an effect on the fitness of the male is specific to their developmental diets . Where male D. angusticollis flies reared on nutrient-poor diets would develop smaller testes and accessory glands, while those that were already adults on a rich diet showing no effects. The amount of protein as well as the age of the adult male can also affect the viability of their offspring. Where younger male adults with less protein in their diet had less viable offspring, yet as they grow older the viability of their offspring increases.

== Mating ==
Derocephalus angusticollis practice polyandrous mating behavior. The possibility of a non-genetic mechanism of inheritance has been explored in this species. Researchers have investigated D. angusticollis to search for evidence of telegony, which suggests that previous partners might be able to influence traits in offspring raised by subsequent males mating with the same female. Males are able to transmit environmentally obtained conditions through paternal effects on the offspring's body size. These effects were experimentally shown to come from a previous male that the female had mated with, not the genetic father of the offspring. The presence of telegony was only observed when females were exposed to the first male after mating, implying that the mechanism is semen-dependent, and not correlated with female choice mechanisms.

=== Morphology ===
==== Male ====
The male genitalia consists of two main components: the aedeagus and the epandrium. The epandrium, which is found at the distal end of the abdomen just before the aedeagus, is the structure used by males to raise the female oviscape in order to gain access to the reproductive duct and facilitate the insertion of the aedeagus. The male's aedeagus consists of three parts: a basal, middle, and distal section. The basal and middle section that are connected by a hinge that allows the aedeagus to be flexible. Its flexibility, in turn, gives males the ability to unfold their aedeagus once inside a female, maneuver through the coiled ducts of females in order to reach the site of the spermathecae, and release their sperm. Compared to T. lineolatus flies, D. angusticollis have a larger rigid spike at the end of their distal section. When genitalia is retracted, the distal section's flexibility allows it to be coiled up at the base of the epandrium.

==== Female ====
The female reproductive anatomy consists of three main components: the oviduct, bursa copulatrix, and spermatheca. When not in use for copulation the bursa copulatrix is bent in an S-shape instead of straight. Derocephalus angusticollis females have three spermathecae surrounded by muscle and are spherical in shape: one at the anterior duct and the other two at the posterior duct. The ducts that lead to these spermathecae, the site where the sperm is stored, are winding and coiled which in turn has led to an example antagonistic coevolution as males, in turn, developed a flexible aedeagus.

=== Sexual competition ===
==== Fighting ====
Males have been found to engage in fighting over territory, in particular, for aggregate sites where female mates are abundant. The dominant male that wins will continue to defend the territory after the fight is over, while the subordinate male moves to a less densely populated area. Competition between males begins by assessing the size of their opponent, and the decision of whether or not to challenge an opponent depends on size. Only if the flies are similarly sized will they fight. Compared to other flies of the same family, D. angusticollis have been found to avoid fighting with males that are larger than themselves. As such, if the condition that the opponent is of similar size or smaller is met, the male challenges his rival by raising the anterior portion of its body and forelegs in a steep angle. In battle, males will then use their head, antennae, and forelegs against their opponent .

==== Courtship and mate guarding ====
Copulation is instigated by the act of the male mounting a female from behind. Researchers have observed, however, that this fly does take part in mate guarding in which the male will use their legs to hold onto the female as well as use their forelegs to prevent other males from getting close to the female during copulation.

==== Sexual conflict ====
Females have been observed to resist mating with a male both before and during copulation. Before copulation, a female may resist by running away, not raising her oviscape (thus preventing the male from having access to her reproductive tract), or using her back legs to kick the males that attempt to mount her. If a male is still able to mount and engage in copulation, females can continue to resist by using their legs to kick the male off. Another means of sexual conflict is cryptic female choice, in which the coiling of the female reproductive tract has coevolved in such a way that successful males would be those that are able to maneuver such coils in order for their sperm to reach the spermathecae.

== Social behavior ==
Females are less active and spend most of their time in the same area drinking sap from damaged trees. Females may aggregate at the same oviposition site as well as act more aggressively with others. Their aggressive behaviors are different from males such as flicking their wings or using their forelegs to combat other females. Conversely, males are more active in moving about aggregation sites in competing for, searching for, and copulating with mates. Some have argued that this more active behavior increases their visibility and probability of coming into contact with predators.

== Chemical signaling ==
Derocephalus angusticollis use chemical signaling by their levels of cuticular hydrocarbons (CHCs) during their social interactions. Both genders have been observed to alter the levels of CHCs depending on where they fall in the social hierarchy of dominance. Subordinates show similar patterns between sexes while dominant flies have different patterns of CHC levels.

== Enemies ==
The main predator that targets this species is skinks (Eulamprus tenuis). In the wild, skinks sneak up on the flies from below. During certain studies that required flies to be identified by markers, there was a concern that the markers increased risk of predation, as the markers were attached to the abdomen to make them visible from above. Due to predators sneaking onto their prey from below, however, researchers have speculated that identification markers on the top part of the flies as used in observations may not make them more visible, as skinks' line of sight is limited to the bottom half of the fly.

== Lifespan in captivity versus in the wild ==
In a study that compared wild and captive D. angusticollis flies, researchers observed differences in both the speed of development as well as the age of mortality. Flies in the wild had accelerated development and did not live as long as those in captivity. This is likely due to varying conditions in the wild (harsh temperatures, risk of predation) as opposed to controlled conditions in the lab.
