= Nipponerius =

Scientific classification
- Kingdom: Animalia
- Phylum: Arthropoda
- Clade: Pancrustacea
- Class: Insecta
- Order: Diptera
- Family: Neriidae
- Genus: Nipponerius; Cresson, 1926

Type species
- Nerius femoratus Coquillett, 1898

Genus of flies

Nipponerius is a genus of cactus flies in the family Neriidae. It is found in Japan. It's only species is Nipponerius femoratus (Coquillett, 1898)
