= Leucophora apivora =

Scientific classification
- Domain: Eukaryota
- Kingdom: Animalia
- Phylum: Arthropoda
- Class: Insecta
- Order: Diptera
- Family: Anthomyiidae
- Subfamily: Anthomyiinae
- Tribe: Hydrophoriini
- Genus: Leucophora
- Species: L. apivora

Binomial name
- Leucophora apivora (Aldrich, 1919)

Synonyms
- Pergandia apivora Aldrich, 1919

Species of fly

Leucophora apivora is a species of root-maggot fly in the family Anthomyiidae.
