= Pseudopomyza =

Scientific classification
- Kingdom: Animalia
- Phylum: Arthropoda
- Class: Insecta
- Order: Diptera
- Family: Pseudopomyzidae
- Genus: Pseudopomyza; Strobl, 1893

Type species
- Pseudopomyza nitidissima Strobl, 1893

Synonyms
- Protoborborus Malloch, 1933; Heluscolia Harrison, 1959

Genus of flies

Pseudopomyza is a genus of flies in the family Pseudopomyzidae.

== Species ==
- Pseudopomyza antipoda (Harrison, 1955)
- Pseudopomyza aranae McAlpine, 2019
- Pseudopomyza aristata (Harrison, 1959)
- Pseudopomyza atrimana (Meigen, 1830)
- Pseudopomyza brevicaudata (Harrison, 1964)
- Pseudopomyza brevis (Harrison, 1976)
- Pseudopomyza collessi McAlpine, 1994
- Pseudopomyza flavitarsis (Harrison, 1959)
- Pseudopomyza neozelandica (Malloch, 1933)
- Pseudopomyza szadziewskii Hoffeins & Woznica, 2013
