= Cyrtinella =

Cyrtinella Temporal range: Eocene

Scientific classification
- Kingdom: Animalia
- Phylum: Arthropoda
- Class: Insecta
- Order: Diptera
- Family: Acroceridae
- Subfamily: Cyrtinae
- Genus: †Cyrtinella; Gillung & Winterton, 2017
- Species: †C. flavinigra

Binomial name
- †Cyrtinella flavinigra Gillung & Winterton, 2017

Extinct genus of flies

Cyrtinella is an extinct genus of small-headed flies in the family Acroceridae. The genus is known from Baltic amber from the Eocene of Poland and Kaliningrad Oblast, Russia. It contains only one species, Cyrtinella flavinigra.

The generic name is derived from the extant genus Cyrtus, referring to the possible close relationship of Cyrtinella with the genus. The specific name is a combination of the Latin words flava (yellow) and nigra (black), referring to the black and yellow coloration of the body.
