= Macalpinella =

Scientific classification
- Kingdom: Animalia
- Phylum: Arthropoda
- Class: Insecta
- Order: Diptera
- Family: Pseudopomyzidae
- Genus: Macalpinella; Papp, 2005

Type species
- Macalpinella brevifacies Papp, 2005

Genus of flies

Macalpinella is a genus of flies in the family Pseudopomyzidae.

== Distribution ==
Taiwan.

== Species ==
- Macalpinella brevifacies Papp, 2005
