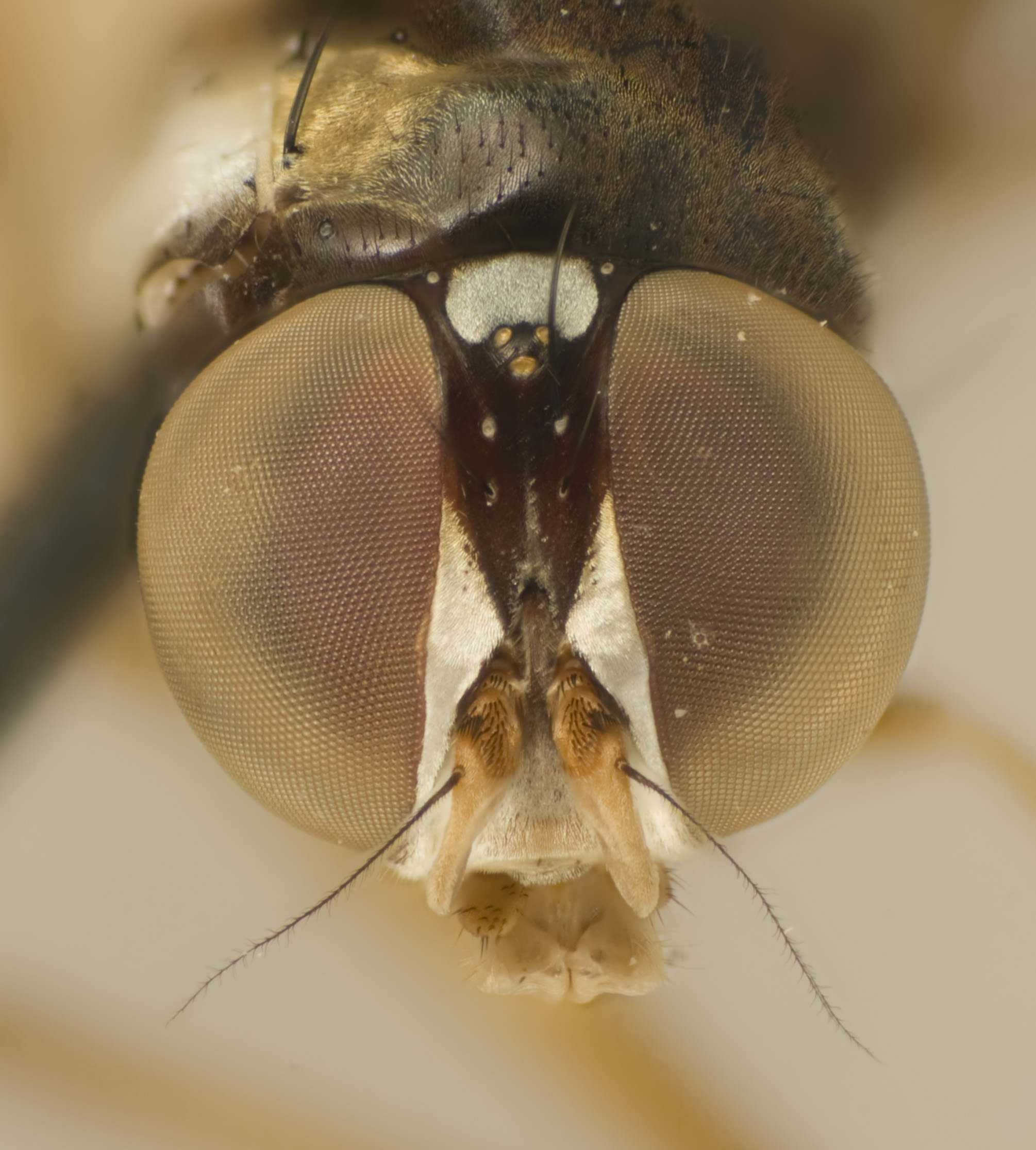
- Head - Neotanypeza abdominalis

Scientific classification
- Domain: Eukaryota
- Kingdom: Animalia
- Phylum: Arthropoda
- Class: Insecta
- Order: Diptera
- Section: Schizophora
- Subsection: Acalyptratae
- Superfamily: Nerioidea
- Family: Tanypezidae; Rondani, 1856

Genera
- Neotanypeza Hendel ,1903; Tanypeza Fallén, 1820

= Tanypezidae =

Family of flies

The Tanypezidae, known as the “stretched-foot flies”, are small family of acalyptrate Diptera (Schizophora, Brachycera). The 28 species are found mostly in the New World, divided between two genera: Tanypeza (2 species) is found in North America, with the type species (T. longimana Fallén) extending into the Palaearctic, and Neotanypeza (26 species) is neotropical in distribution and includes one species known only from Dominican amber from 17 to 20 million years ago, N. dominicana Lonsdale & Apigian. This distribution contrasts that of its sister family, the Strongylophthalmyiidae, which is mostly East Asian in distribution.

The family was recently treated by Lonsdale (2013), who redefined the family and its genera, synonymizing all other neotropical tanypezid genera in Neotanypeza. Lonsdale (2014) also provided a full catalogue for the family.

Species of Tanypezidae are relatively large and have semispherical heads and stout bodies that are perched atop long, thin legs, the latter of which have sometimes allied them with the families Neriidae and Micropezidae. The head and thorax are also often very dark with contrasting silver- (sometimes golden-) haired stripes and spots. Furthermore, apical convergence of wing veins R_{4+5} and M_{1} occurs, and no vibrissae, setulae on the upper surface of vein R_{1}, and a large, flat ocellar disc behind the ocelli. Little is known of the biology of tanypezid species, but T. longimana is known from low vegetation in humid deciduous woodlands, often around running water.
