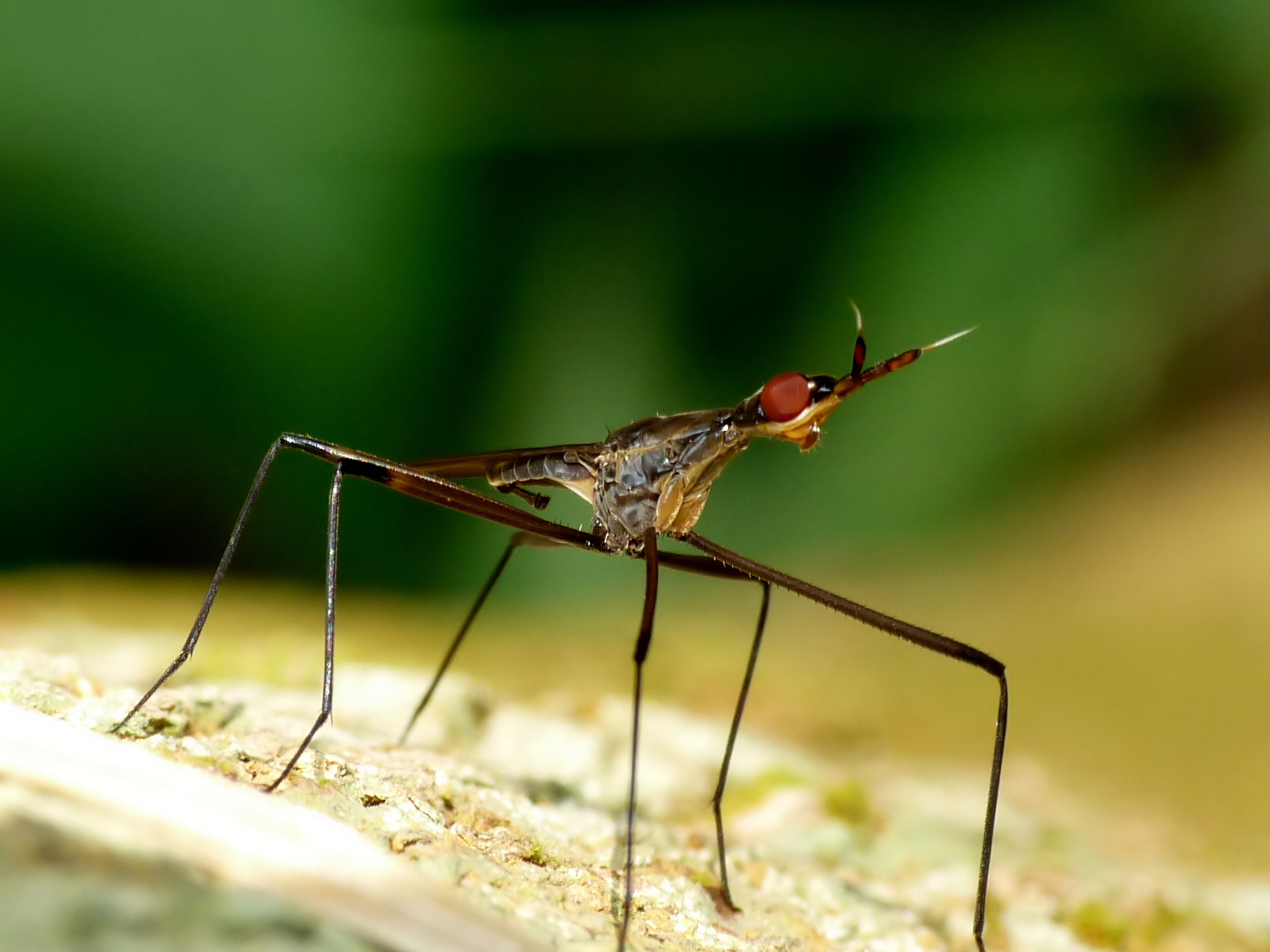
- Telostylinus lineolatus from India

Scientific classification
- Kingdom: Animalia
- Phylum: Arthropoda
- Clade: Pancrustacea
- Class: Insecta
- Order: Diptera
- Section: Schizophora
- Subsection: Acalyptratae
- Superfamily: Nerioidea
- Family: Neriidae; Westwood, 1840

Genera
- Antillonerius Hennig, 1937; Chaetonerius Hendel, 1903; Derocephalus Enderlein, 1922; Eoloxozus Aczél, 1961; Eoneria Aczél, 1951; Glyphidops Enderlein, 1922; Gymnonerius Hendel, 1913; Indonesicesa Koçak & Kemal, 2009; Longina Wiedemann, 1830; Loxozus Enderlein, 1922; Nerius Fabricius, 1805; Nipponerius Cresson, 1926; Odontoloxozus Enderlein, 1922; Odontoscelia Enderlein, 1922; Paranerius Bigot, 1883; Protonerius Meijere, 1924; Stypocladius Enderlein, 1922; Telostylinus Enderlein, 1922; Telostylus Bigot, 1859

= Neriidae =

Family of flies

The Neriidae are a family of true flies (Diptera) closely related to the Micropezidae. Some species are known as cactus flies, while others have been called banana stalk flies and the family was earlier treated as subfamily of the Micropezidae which are often called stilt-legged flies. Neriids differ from micropezids in having no significant reduction of the fore legs. Neriids breed in rotting vegetation, such as decaying tree bark or rotting fruit. About 100 species are placed in 19 genera. Neriidae are found mainly in tropical regions, but two North American genera occur, each with one species, and one species of Telostylinus occurs in temperate regions of eastern Australia.

== Family characteristics ==
Most species of Neriidae are slender, long-legged flies. Many exhibit striped patterns that appear to provide camouflage against tree bark. Many neriids are sexually dimorphic, with males having more elongated bodies, heads, antennae, and legs than females. In some species, the male fore-tibia is greatly thickened distally. Neriid flies are saprophagous. Larvae develop in rotting vegetable matter, including bark and fruit. Neriid adults tend to aggregate on rotting vegetable matter or damaged tree trunks. Neriid adults are also attracted to flowers or other sources of sugar. The upper face has a medial division and the antennae are porrect. The arista on the antenna arises at the tip (not dorsally, as in the Micropezidae). The fore legs are long with prominent coxae. In the Micropezidae, the fore legs are reduced. The fore femora (and sometimes all femora) bear ventral spines in males. The fore tibia of males may have rows of spines or tubercles. The third and fourth veins of the wing converge at the tip and the first vein is not setulose. Neriids have 1-5 frontal bristles, no ocellar bristles and some have reduced postvertical bristles.

For terms see Morphology of Diptera

== Ecology and evolution of neriid flies ==
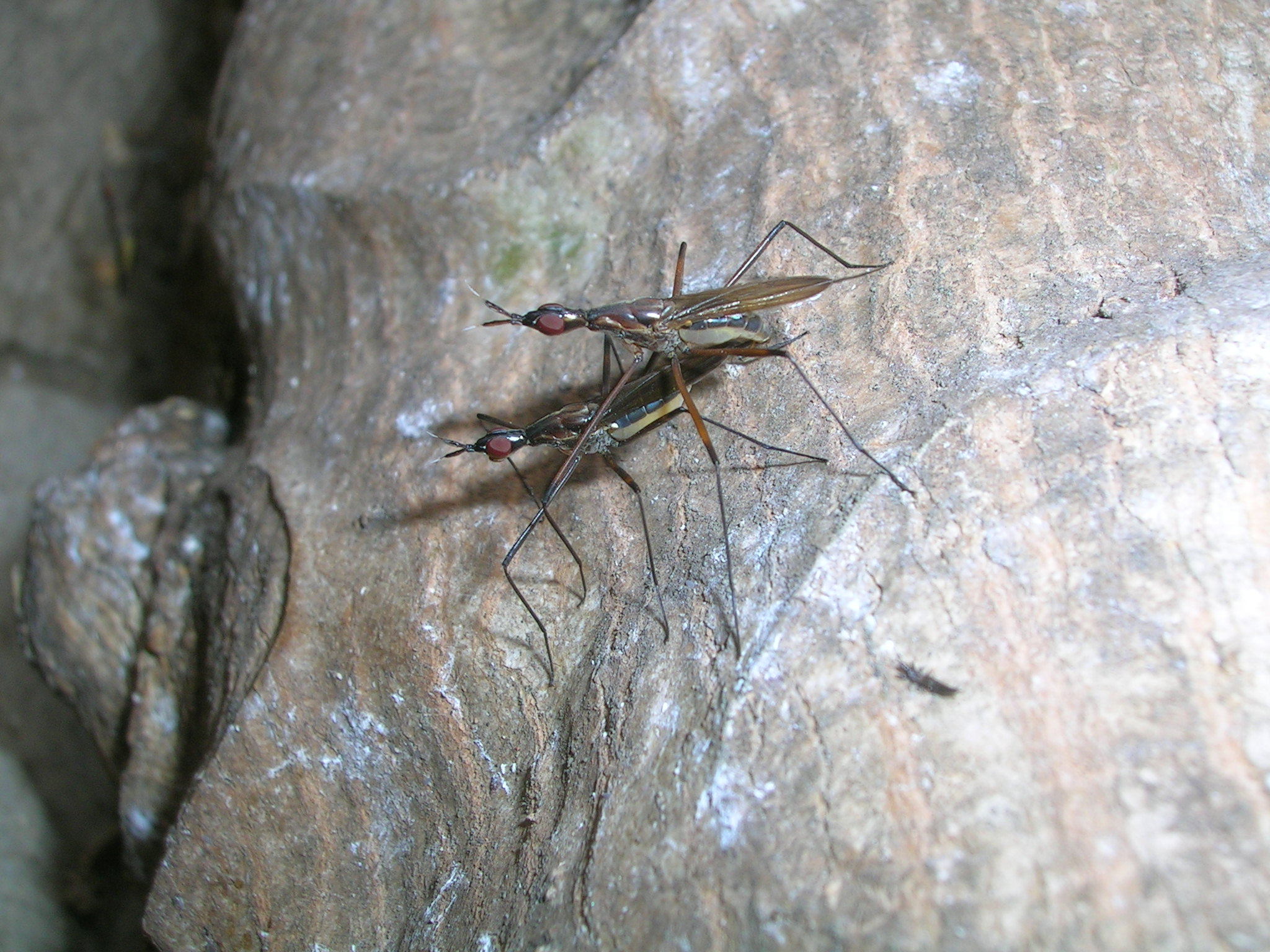
Pair in copula

Males of some species engage in spectacular combat for territory or access to females. The rivals elevate their bodies to an almost vertical posture, and pound each other with the ventral surfaces of their heads, strike each other with their forelegs, or try to place each other in a head-lock. Photos of mating and combat can be seen here.

Research on the Australian neriid Derocephalus angusticollis has shown that adult body size and shape are extremely sensitive to larval diet: larvae reared in nutrient-rich substrates exhibit greater body size as adults, and males have more elongated bodies, compared to flies reared in nutrient-poor substrates. The expression of male secondary sexual traits is particularly sensitive to the protein content of the larval diet. Developmental plasticity in response to variation in larval diet quality has diversified among populations of Telostylinus angusticollis along the east coast of Australia.

Research on Derocephalus angusticollis has also shown that a male's larval diet can influence the body size of his offspring. Males reared on a nutrient-rich larval diet produce larger offspring than their brothers reared on a nutrient-poor larval diet, and this paternal effect appears to be sensitive to the male's social environment. In addition, recent research on this species has led to the discovery of a new form of nonparental transgenerational effect, whereby a male's larval diet quality can influence the body size of offspring sired by a subsequent male that mates as much as two weeks later with the same female. This effect is a form of telegony.

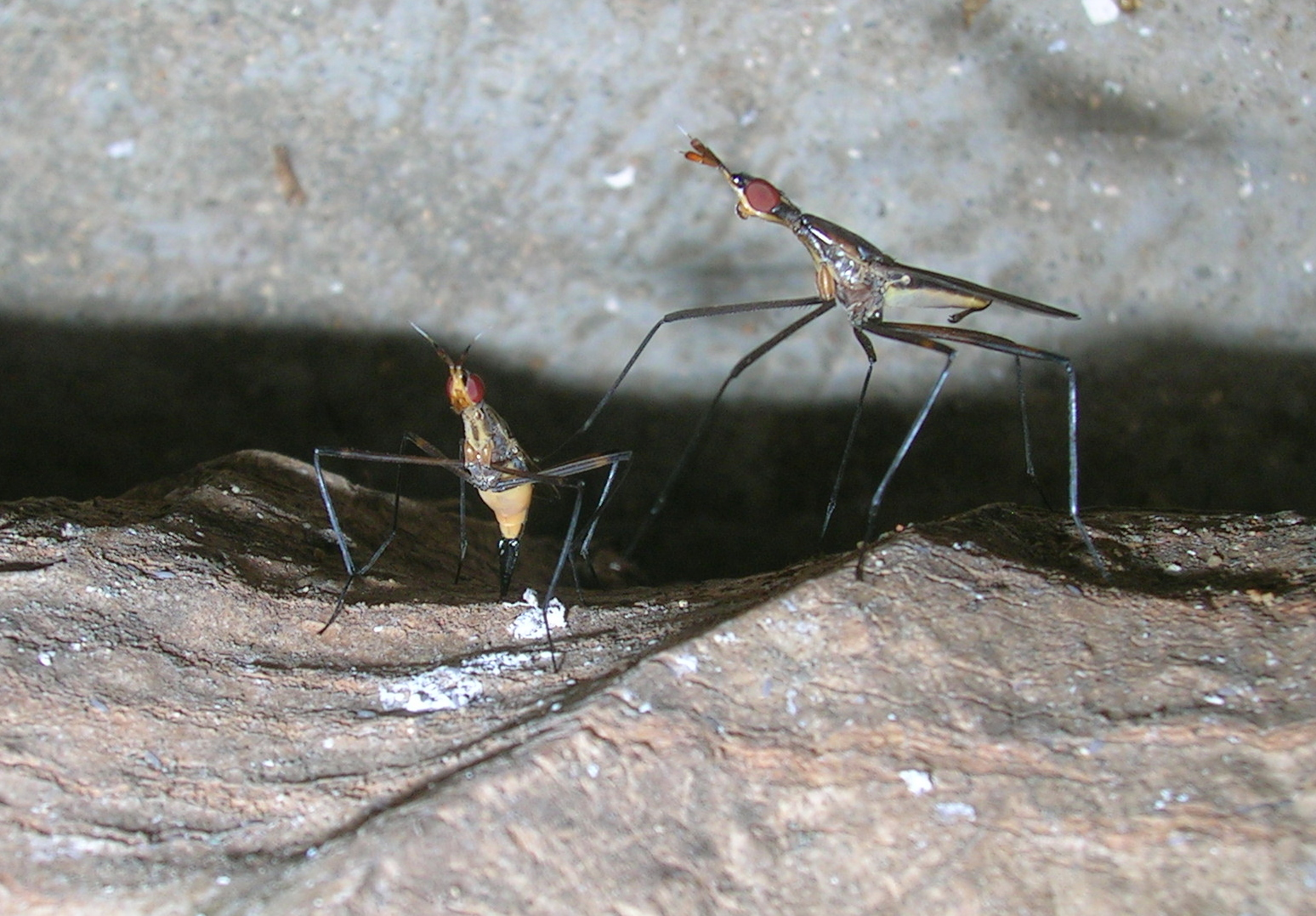
Female at left oviposits while a male stands by

As in some tephritoid flies, neriid larvae in their final instar are capable of skipping. To skip, a maggot bends its body into a 'C', grasps its posterior end with its mouth-hooks, tightens the muscles in its body wall, and then releases its hold, causing its posterior end to recoil against the substrate. Although their skipping abilities are not as impressive as those of piophilid maggots, neriid maggots can skip distances > 20 cm.
