= Willi Hennig =

German biologist and zoologist (1913–1976)

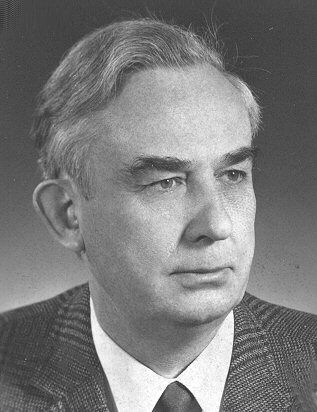
- Willi Hennig in 1972
- Born: Emil Hans Willi Hennig; 20 April 1913; Dürrhennersdorf, German Empire
- Died: 5 November 1976 (aged 63); Ludwigsburg, West Germany
- Education: State Museum of Zoology, Dresden, University of Leipzig
- Known for: Cladistics, Hennig's progression rule
- Spouse: Irma Wehnert
- Awards: Linnean Medal (1974), honorary doctorate from the Freie Universität Berlin
- Scientific career
- Fields: Taxonomy, Entomology
- Workplaces: Kaiser-Wilhelm-Gesellschaft, Berlin-Dahlem; State Museum of Natural History, Stuttgart

Emil Hans Willi Hennig (20 April 1913 – 5 November 1976) was a German biologist and zoologist who is considered the founder of phylogenetic systematics, otherwise known as cladistics. In 1945 as a prisoner of war, Hennig began work on his theory of cladistics, which he published in German in 1950, with a substantially revised English translation published in 1966. With his works on evolution and systematics he revolutionised the view of the natural order of beings. As a taxonomist, he specialised in dipterans (true flies).

Hennig coined the key terms synapomorphy, symplesiomorphy, and paraphyly. He also asserted, in his "auxiliary principle", that "the presence of apomorphous (apomorphy) characters in different species 'is always reason for suspecting kinship [i.e., that species belong to a monophyletic group], and that their origin by convergence should not be presumed a priori' (Hennig, 1953). This was based on the conviction that 'phylogenetic systematics would lose all ground on which it stands' if the presence of apomorphous characters in different species were considered first of all as convergences (or parallelisms), with proof to the contrary required in each case." This has been viewed as an application of the parsimony principle to the interpretation of characters, an important component of phylogenetic inference.

He is also remembered for Hennig's progression rule in cladistics, which argues controversially that the most primitive species are found in the earliest, central part of a group's area.

== Biography ==
=== Early years and studies ===
Hennig was born in Dürrhennersdorf, Upper Lusatia. His mother Marie Emma, née Groß, worked as a maid and, later, factory worker. His father Karl Ernst Emil Hennig was a rail worker. Willi had two brothers, Fritz Rudolf Hennig, who became a minister, and Karl Herbert, who went missing at the Battle of Stalingrad in 1943.

In the spring of 1919, Willi Hennig started school in Dürrhennersdorf, and subsequently was at school in Taubenheim an der Spree and Oppach. Rudolf Hennig described the family as calm; his father possessed an even temperament.

As of 1927, Willi Hennig continued his education at the Realgymnasium and boarding school in Klotzsche near Dresden. Here he met his first mentor M. Rost, a science teacher, whom he lived with in a house known as the "Abteilung". Rost had an interest in insects and introduced Hennig to Wilhelm Meise, who worked as a scientist at the Dresdener Museum für Tierkunde (State Museum of Zoology, Dresden). In 1930, Hennig skipped a year, and graduated on 26 February 1932. As early as 1931, Willi Hennig composed an essay entitled Die Stellung der Systematik in der Zoologie ("The state of systematics in zoology") as part of his school work, published posthumously in 1978. It showed his interest as well as his deliberate treatment of systematic problems. Besides school, Hennig worked as a volunteer at the museum and, in collaboration with Meise, saw to the systematic and biogeographical investigation of the "flying" snakes of the genus Dendrophis that became his first published work.

From the summer semester of 1932 onwards, Hennig read zoology, botany and geology at the University of Leipzig. He would continue to visit the Museum in Dresden. There, he met the curator of the entomological collection, the Dipteran expert Fritz Isidor van Emden. Hennig saw him regularly until van Emden was expelled from National Socialist Germany for having a Jewish mother and wife.

Hennig developed a deep friendship with Emden's successor, Klaus Günther. Hennig concluded his studies with a dissertation entitled, Beiträge zur Kenntnis des Kopulationsapparates der cyclorrhaphen Dipteren. By this time, Hennig had published eight scientific papers. Besides his 300-page revision of the Tylidae (now classed as Micropezidae), there were further papers on Diptera and the agamid genus Draco of gliding lizards. After his studies, Hennig was Volontär at the State Museum for Zoology in Dresden. On 1 January 1937, he obtained a scholarship from the Deutsche Forschungsgemeinschaft (DFG) to work at the German Entomological Institute of the Kaiser-Wilhelm-Gesellschaft in Berlin-Dahlem. On 13 May 1939, Hennig married his former fellow student Irma Wehnert. By 1945, they had three sons, Wolfgang (born 1941), Bernd (born 1943) and Gerd (born 1945).

=== As a military entomologist ===
Willi Hennig was drafted in 1938 to train for the infantry and concluded this course in 1939. As of the start of World War II, he was deployed in the infantry in Poland, France, Denmark and Russia. He was injured by grenade shrapnel in 1942 and was subsequently used as entomologist at the Institute for Tropical Medicine and Hygiene in Berlin, carrying the rank of a Sonderführer (Z). Just before the war ended, he was sent to Italy to the 10th Army, Heeresgruppe C, to fight malaria and other epidemic diseases. At the end of the war in May 1945, he was captured by the British while he was with the Malaria training corps at the Gulf of Trieste, and was only released in the autumn.

Through his active participation in war as soldier and scientist Hennig was later subjected to accusations that he had been a member of the National Socialist party, especially by the Italian biologist and founder of panbiogeography, Leon Croizat. No evidence has been officially presented to support the claim. There is no report of Hennig supporting the National Socialist party views publicly on any occasion. Hennig did believe that Nazi Germany would win World War II.

During his time as prisoner of war, Hennig began to draft his most important contribution to systematics, not published until 1950. The rough draft was composed with pencil and ballpoint pen into an A4 exercise book, spanning 170 pages. During the war, he also published a further 25 scientific papers. Most of the correspondence and literature research was conducted by his wife, Irma.

=== 1950s: Basic outline of a theory of phylogenetic systematics ===
From 1 December 1945, to 31 March 1947, Willi Hennig stood in for his thesis supervisor Paul Buchner as assistant to Professor Friedrich Hempelmann at the University of Leipzig, giving lectures in general biology, zoology and special zoology of insects. He returned to the German Entomological Institute in Berlin on 1 April 1947, and gave up his position in Leipzig. From 1 November 1949, he led the section for systematic entomology and was second director of the institute. On 1 August 1950, he habilitated in zoology at the Brandenburgische Landeshochschule in Potsdam. On 10 October that year he was offered a professorship with teaching responsibilities, which he fulfilled lecturing on special zoology of invertebrates, systematic zoology and taxonomic practicals. In the same year, he published his Basic outline of a theory of phylogenetic systematics, and further works on the methodology of phylogenetic systematics followed in the ensuing years, accompanied by numerous taxonomic works about Diptera. His two-volume Pocket book of zoology, in which he applied phylogenetic systematics to invertebrates for the first time, was particularly successful.

He continued working at the German Entomological Institute in the Soviet Sector of Berlin, Berlin-Friedrichshagen, all the while living in the American sector in Berlin-Steglitz. On a trip to France with his son on 13 August 1961, he heard of the impending Berlin Wall and returned to Berlin immediately to quit his appointment. Moving to East Berlin was out of the question, as Hennig held anti-communist views and already had a troubled relationship with the Sozialistische Einheitspartei Deutschlands (Socialist Unity Party of Germany, SED) that was the ruling political party of East Germany, as Hennig had repeatedly helped employees of the institute gain employment in the West.

=== 1961 to 1976 ===
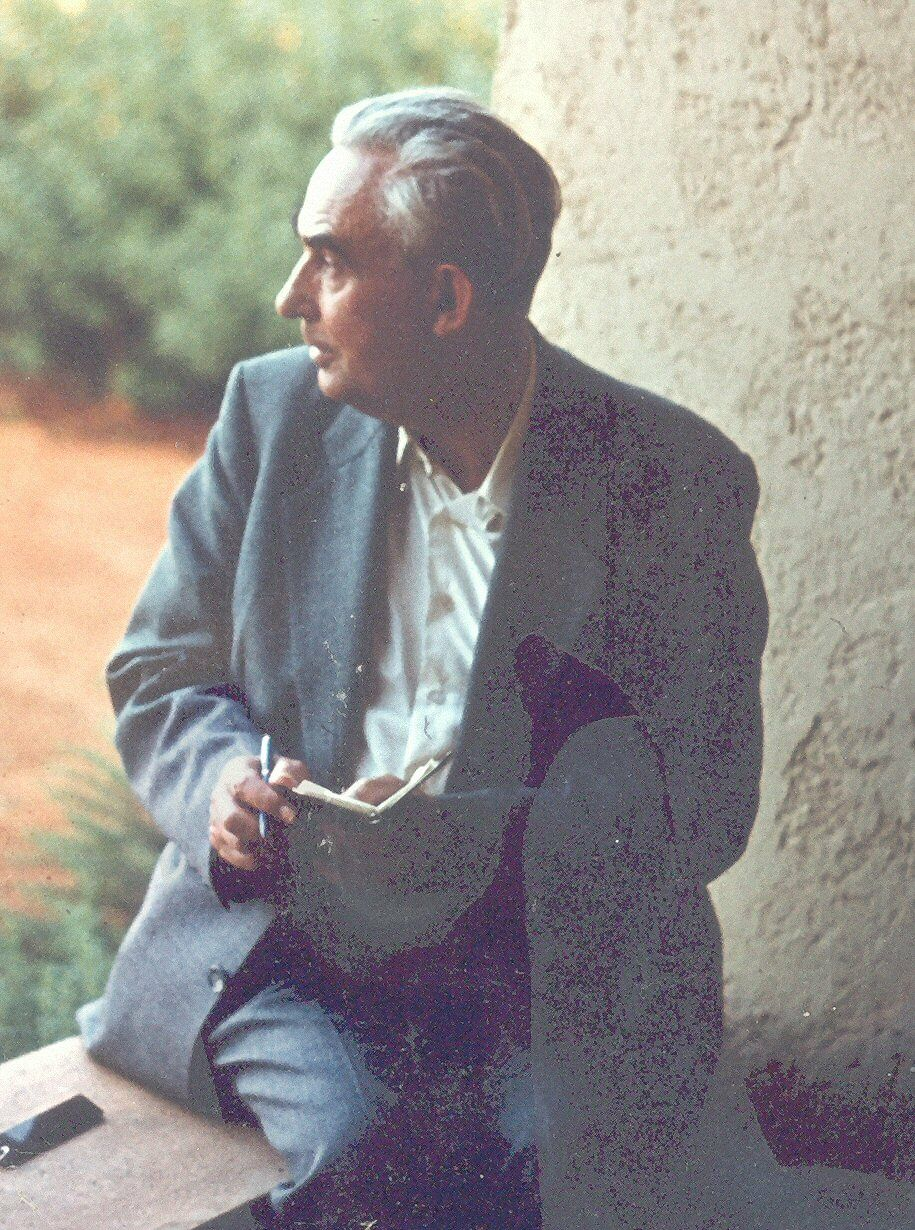
Hennig, c. 1970

In West Berlin, Hennig was given an interim post at the Technische Universität Berlin as Distinguished Professor. He rejected offers from the U.S. Department of Agriculture in Washington, D.C., and an offer made by his friend Elmo Hardy, to become a Research Fellow at the University of Hawaiʻi in Honolulu, citing as reasons that the education of his sons took priority for him, and that he needed to have the "cultural witnesses of the antique Greek-Roman Europe within ready access". He instead decided on a post at the State Museum of Natural History in Stuttgart, where he was given a department for phylogenetic research. In April 1963, he moved to Ludwigsburg-Pflugfelden for this position. The scientific collections of the museum had been provisorily kept in Ludwigsburg and remained here until their re-housing at the new site of the museum at Stuttgart's Löwentor, in 1985.

Hennig's works in Stuttgart dealt almost exclusively with taxonomic revisions of Dipterans. For the Stuttgarter Beiträge zur Naturkunde, where he published the majority of his works, he completed 29 issues by the end of his life. Significant are the review articles published in Erwin Lindner's Flies of the Palaearctic Regions and the Handbuch der Zoologie. The cladistic methodology was also represented in several published works, foremost among them the article, Cladistic analysis or cladistic classification? A reply to Ernst Mayr (1974), intended as an internationally accessible reply to the criticism Ernst Mayr had made of Hennig's phylogenetic systematics.

Willi Hennig only visited international institutions abroad twice, in spite of receiving many invitations for guest lectures. From 1 September to 30 November 1967, he worked at the Entomology Research Institute at Canada's Department of Agriculture in Ottawa and participated in the International Congress of Entomology in Canberra from 22 to 30 August 1972. With his wife, he also visited Bangkok, New Guinea (where much of Mayr's understanding of bird taxonomy originated) and Singapore on this latter trip. His stay in Canada was also used for visits to various entomological collections in museums of the US, including Cambridge, Chicago, Washington, D.C., and New York, always in the hope of finding further amber inclusions of Dipterans, that featured prominently in his research of the late 1960s and early 1970s. On the initiative of Klaus Günther, who by then held a chair at the Freie Universität Berlin, Hennig was given an honorary doctorate on 4 December 1968; for health reasons, he could not accept this honour in person, and it was presented to him by Günther on 21 March 1969, in Stuttgart. On the initiative of students whom he had lectured on several animal taxa, Hennig was made an honorary professor at the University of Tübingen on 27 February 1970.

On the night of 5 November 1976, Hennig died of a heart attack at Ludwigsburg. He had previously repeatedly cancelled lectures with reference to his fading health, and had already had an attack on his journey to Ottawa. He was interred on 10 November at the Bergfriedhof in Tübingen.

The dipteran genus Hennigiola is named after him, as is the Evaniid wasp Hyptia hennigi.

== Legacy ==
The Willi Hennig Society, an organization devoted to the advancement of cladistic principles in systematic biology, was founded in 1981. The society publishes the journal Cladistics. A symposium, Willi Hennig (1913-1976): His Life, Legacy and the Future of Phylogenetic Systematics, was held in London by the Linnean Society of London on 27 November 2013. A symposium volume was published in 2016 by the Systematics Association.

== Selected works ==
Books:

- Die Larvenformen der Dipteren, 3 volumes, Berlin: Akademie-Verlag, 1948-1952.
- Grundzüge einer Theorie der phylogenetischen Systematik, Berlin: Deutscher Zentralverlag, 1950.
- Phylogenetic Systematics, translated by D. Davis and R. Zangerl, Urbana: University of Illinois Press, 1966 (reprinted 1979).
- Die Stammesgeschichte der Insekten, Frankfurt am Main: Verlag von Waldemar Kramer, 1969.
- Phylogenetische Systematik, edited by Prof. Dr. Wolfgang Hennig, Berlin and Hamburg: Verlag Paul Parey, 1982.
- Aufgaben und Probleme stammesgeschichtlicher Forschung, Berlin: Paul Parey, 1984.

Articles:

- "Die Schlangengattung Dendrophis," Zoologischer Anzeiger, volume 99, 1932, pages 273–297 (gemeinsam mit W. Meise).
- "Beziehungen zwischen geographischer Verbreitung und systematischer Gliederung bei einigen Dipterenfamilien: ein Beitrag zum Problem der Gliederung systematischer Kategorien höherer Ordnung," Zoologischer Anzeiger, volume 116, 1936, pages 161–175.
- "Revision der Gattung Draco (Agamidae)," Temminckia: a Journal of Systematic Zoology, volume 1, 1936, pages 153–220.
- "Über einige Gesetzmäßigkeiten der geographischen Variation in der Reptiliengattung Draco L.: „parallele" und konvergente Rassenbildung," Biolog. Zentralblatt, volume 56, 1936, pages 549–559.
- "Die Gattung Rachicerus Walker und ihre Verwandten im Baltischen Bernstein," Zoologischer Anzeiger., volume 123, 1938, pages 33–41.
- "Probleme der biologischen Systematik," Forschungen und Fortschritte, volume 21/23, 1947, pages 276–279.
- "Kritische Bemerkungen zum phylogenetischen System der Insekten," Beiträge zur Entomologie, volume 3 (Sonderheft), 1953, pages 1–85.
- "Flügelgeäder und System der Dipteren unter Berücksichtigung der aus dem Mesozoikum beschriebenen Fossilien," Beiträge zur Entomologie, volume 4, 1954, pages 245–388.
- "Systematik und Phylogenese," Bericht Hunderjahrfeier Dtsch. Ent. Ges., 1956, pages 50–71.
- "Die Familien der Diptera Schizophora und ihre phylogenetischen Verwandtschaftsbeziehungen," Beitr. Ent., volume 8, 1958, pages 508–688.
- "Die Dipteren-Fauna von Neuseeland als systematisches und tiergeographisches Problem," Beitr. Ent., volume 10, 1960, pages 221–329.
- "Phylogenetic Systematics," Annu. Rev. Entomol., volume 10, 1965, pages 97–116.
- "Dixidae aus dem Baltischen Bernstein, mit Bemerkungen über einige andere fossile Arten aus der Gruppe Culicoidea," Beitr. Naturkde, volume 153, 1966, pages 1–16.
- "Die sogenannten „niederen Brachycera" im Baltischen Bernstein," Beitr. Naturkde, volume 174, 1967, pages 1–51.
- "Kritische Bemerkungen über den Bau der Flügelwurzel bei den Dipteren und die Frage nach der Monophylie der Nematocera," Beitr. Naturkde, volume 193, 1968, pages 1–23.
- "Cladistic Analysis or Cladistic Classification? A reply to Ernst Mayr," Systematic Biology, volume 24, 1975, pages 244–256.

== Sources ==
- Peters, G. (1995). "Über Willi Hennig als Forscherpersönlichkeit". Veröffentlichungen der Gesellschaft Naturforschende Freunde. 34. Berlin: 3–10.
- Schlee, D. (1978). "In Memoriam Willi Hennig 1913-1976. Eine biographische Skizze". Entomologica Germanica. 4. Stuttgart: Fischer: 377–391. doi:10.1127/entom.germ/4/1978/377. ISSN 0340-2266.
- Schmitt, M. (2001). "Willi Hennig". In Jahn, I.; Schmitt M. (eds.). Darwin & Co. II - Die Geschichte der Biologie in Porträts. München: C.H. Beck. ISBN 3-406-44642-6.
- Schmitt, M. (2002). "Willi Hennig als akademischer Lehrer". In Schulz J. (ed.). Fokus Biologiegeschichte. Zum 80. Geburtstag der Biologiehistorikerin Ilse Jahn. Berlin: Akadras. pp. 53–64. ISBN 3-00-009209-9.
- Schmitt, M. (2003). "Willi Hennig and the Rise of Cladistics". In Legakis, A.; Sfenthourakis, S.; Polymeni, R.; Thessalou-Legaki M. (eds.). The New Panorama of Animal Evolution - Proceedings of the 18th International Congress of Zoology. Sofia - Moskau: Pensoft Publishers. pp. 369–379. ISBN 954-642-164-2.
- Vogel, J.; Xylander, W.R. (1999). "Willi Hennig - Ein Oberlausitzer Naturforscher mit Weltgeltung. Recherchen zu seiner Familiengeschichte sowie Kinder- und Jugendzeit". Berichte der Naturforschenden Gesellschaft Oberlausitz. 7/8: 131–141. ISSN 0941-0627.

== See also ==
- Phylogenetics
