= Delia montezumae =

Scientific classification
- Kingdom: Animalia
- Phylum: Arthropoda
- Class: Insecta
- Order: Diptera
- Family: Anthomyiidae
- Genus: Delia
- Species: D. montezumae

Binomial name
- Delia montezumae Griffiths, 1991

Species of fly

Delia montezumae is a species of root fly from Delia genus, Anthomyiidae family, described by Griffiths in the year 1991.
