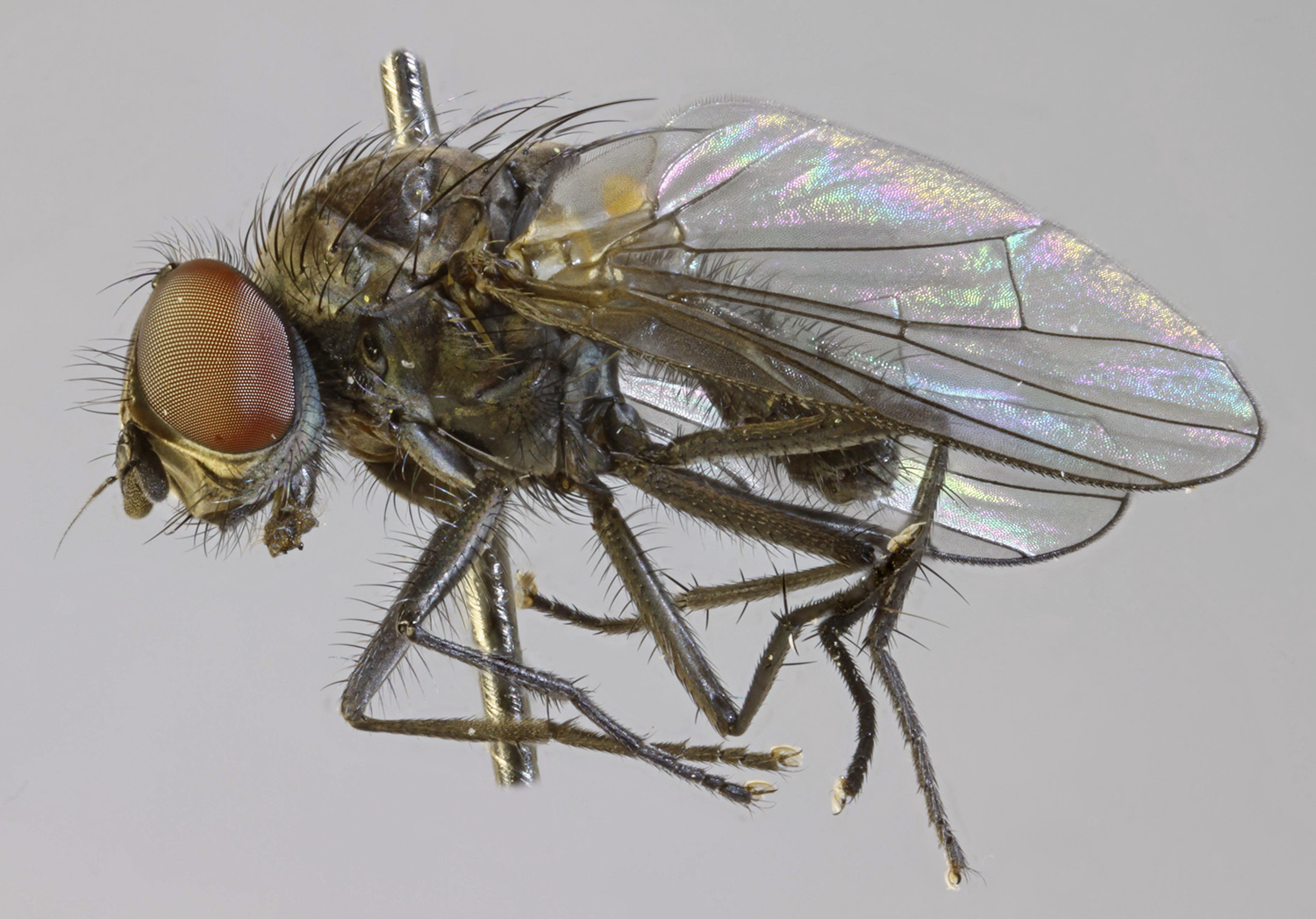
- Pegoplata infirma North Wales.

Scientific classification
- Kingdom: Animalia
- Phylum: Arthropoda
- Class: Insecta
- Order: Diptera
- Family: Anthomyiidae
- Genus: Pegoplata
- Species: P. infirma

Binomial name
- Pegoplata infirma (Meigen, 1826)

= Pegoplata infirma =

Species of fly

Pegoplata infirma is a species of fly in the family Anthomyiidae. It is found in the Palearctic. For identification see:
