= Eutrichota gopheri =

Scientific classification
- Domain: Eukaryota
- Kingdom: Animalia
- Phylum: Arthropoda
- Class: Insecta
- Order: Diptera
- Family: Anthomyiidae
- Genus: Eutrichota
- Species: E. gopheri

Binomial name
- Eutrichota gopheri (Johnson, 1913)

Synonyms
- Pegomyia gopheri Johnson, 1913

Species of fly

Eutrichota gopheri, the gopher tortoise burrow fly, is a species of root-maggot flies in the family Anthomyiidae.
