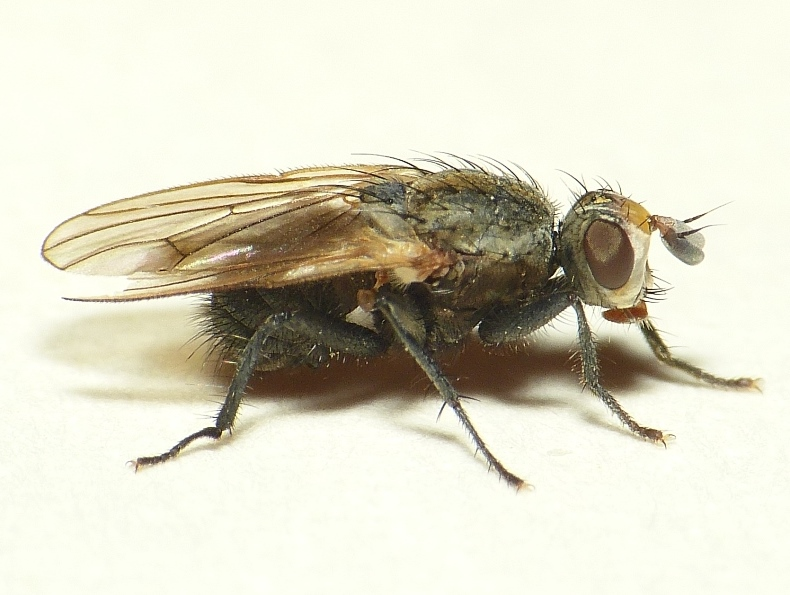
- Myopina myopina Netherlands

Scientific classification
- Kingdom: Animalia
- Phylum: Arthropoda
- Class: Insecta
- Order: Diptera
- Family: Anthomyiidae
- Genus: Myopina
- Species: M. myopina

Binomial name
- Myopina myopina (Fallen, 1824)

= Myopina myopina =

Species of fly

Myopina myopina is a species of fly in the family Anthomyiidae. It is found in the Palearctic. For identification see:
