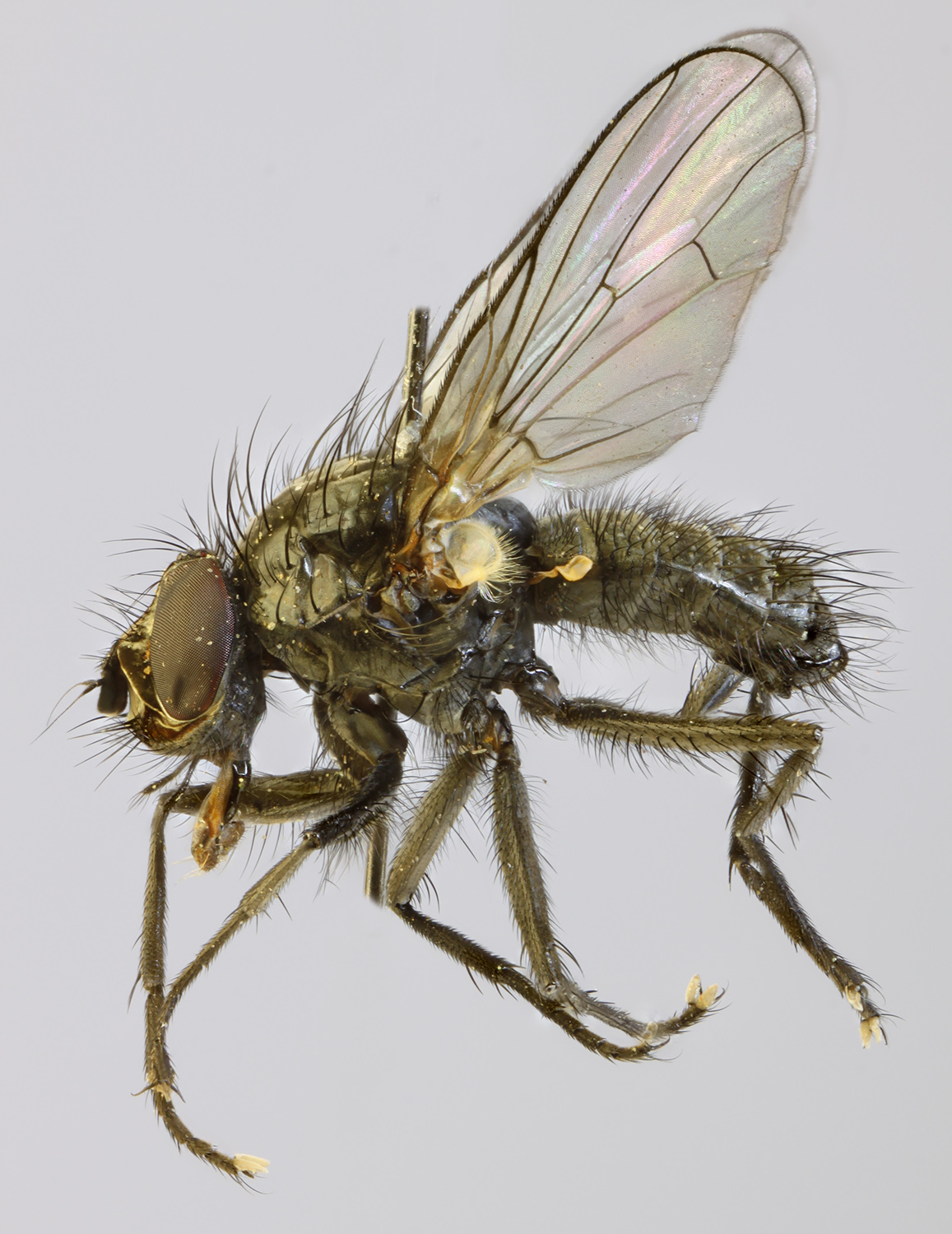
- Alliopsis billbergi North Wales

Scientific classification
- Kingdom: Animalia
- Phylum: Arthropoda
- Class: Insecta
- Order: Diptera
- Family: Anthomyiidae
- Genus: Alliopsis
- Species: A. billbergi

Binomial name
- Alliopsis billbergi (Zetterstedt, 1838)

= Alliopsis billbergi =

Species of fly

Alliopsis billbergi is a species of fly in the family Anthomyiidae. It is found in the Palearctic. The larvae are phytophagous.
