= Eutrichota lividiventris =

Scientific classification
- Domain: Eukaryota
- Kingdom: Animalia
- Phylum: Arthropoda
- Class: Insecta
- Order: Diptera
- Family: Anthomyiidae
- Genus: Eutrichota
- Species: E. lividiventris

Binomial name
- Eutrichota lividiventris (Huckett, 1939)

Synonyms
- Pegomyia lividiventris Huckett, 1939

Species of fly

Eutrichota lividiventris is a species of root-maggot flies in the family Anthomyiidae.
