= Delia pluvialis =

Scientific classification
- Domain: Eukaryota
- Kingdom: Animalia
- Phylum: Arthropoda
- Class: Insecta
- Order: Diptera
- Family: Anthomyiidae
- Genus: Delia
- Species: D. pluvialis

Binomial name
- Delia pluvialis (Malloch, 1918)

Synonyms
- Hylemyia pluvialis Malloch, 1918

Species of fly

Delia pluvialis is a species of root-maggot flies in the family Anthomyiidae.
