= Delia arambourgi =

Scientific classification
- Kingdom: Animalia
- Phylum: Arthropoda
- Class: Insecta
- Order: Diptera
- Family: Anthomyiidae
- Genus: Delia
- Species: D. arambourgi

Binomial name
- Delia arambourgi (Stein in Becker, 1903)

Species of fly

Delia arambourgi is a species of fly in the family Anthomyiidae. It is a pest of teff and pearl millet in Ethiopia.
