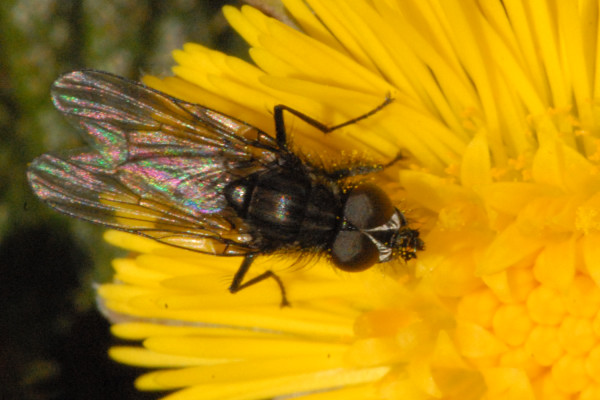

Scientific classification
- Kingdom: Animalia
- Phylum: Arthropoda
- Class: Insecta
- Order: Diptera
- Family: Anthomyiidae
- Genus: Egle
- Species: E. ciliata

Binomial name
- Egle ciliata (Walker, 1849)

Synonyms
- Anthomyia determinata Walker, 1849; Eriphia ciliata Walker, 1849

= Egle ciliata =

Species of fly

Egle ciliata is a species of root-maggot flies in the family Anthomyiidae.

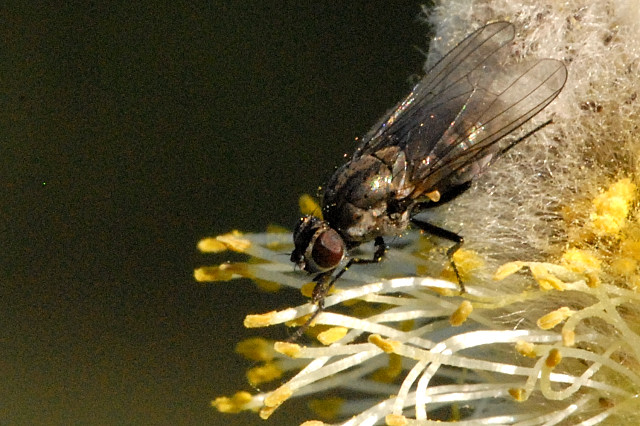
