= Eutrichota affinis =

Scientific classification
- Kingdom: Animalia
- Phylum: Arthropoda
- Class: Insecta
- Order: Diptera
- Family: Anthomyiidae
- Subfamily: Pegomyinae
- Tribe: Pegomyini
- Genus: Eutrichota
- Species: E. affinis

Binomial name
- Eutrichota affinis (Stein, 1898)

Synonyms
- Pegomya fuscopunctata Huckett, 1966; Pegomyia affinis Stein, 1898

Species of fly

Eutrichota affinis is a species of root-maggot flies within the family Anthomyiidae.
