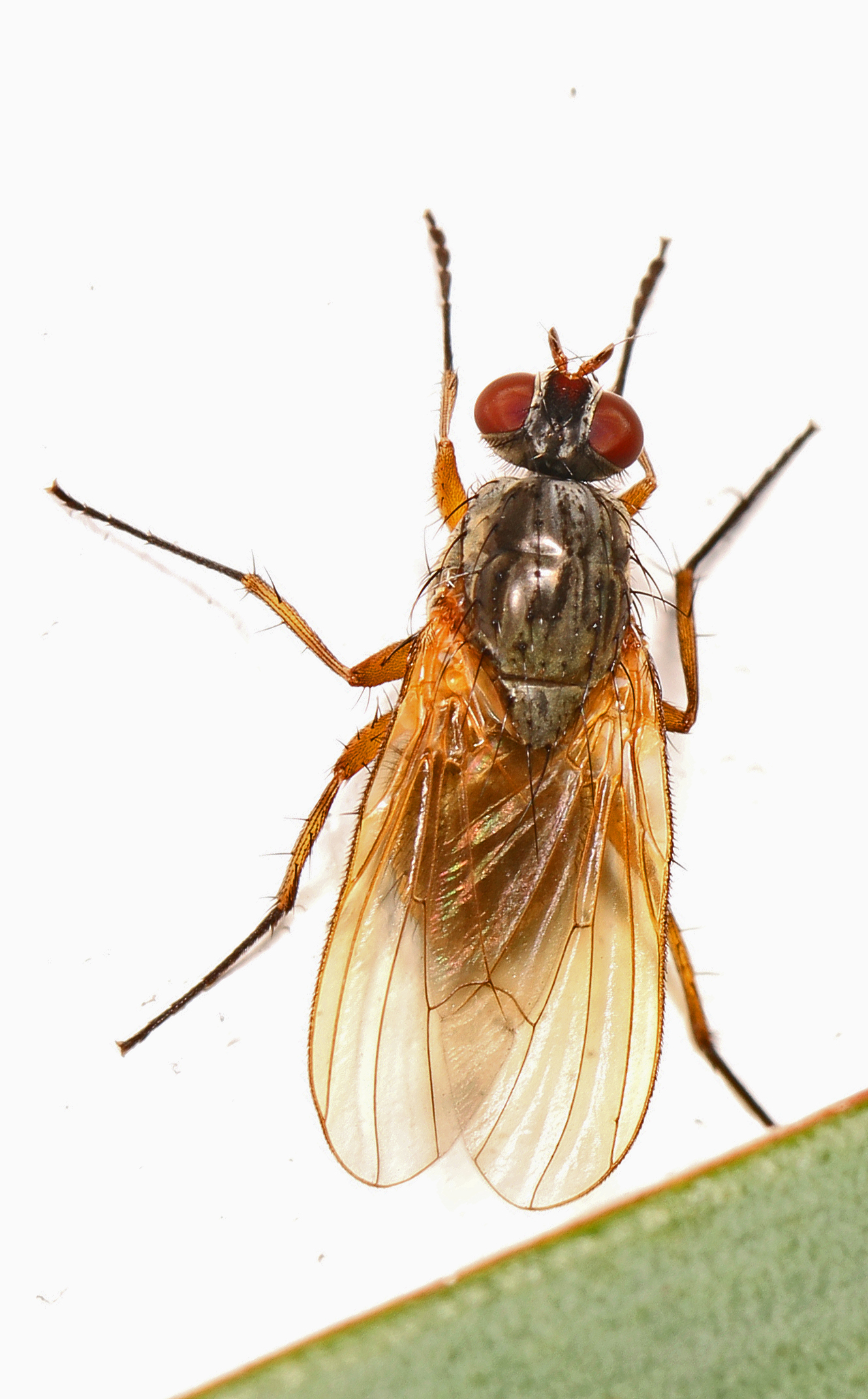

Scientific classification
- Kingdom: Animalia
- Phylum: Arthropoda
- Class: Insecta
- Order: Diptera
- Family: Anthomyiidae
- Genus: Eutrichota
- Species: E. lipsia

Binomial name
- Eutrichota lipsia (Walker, 1849)

Synonyms
- Anthomyia lipsia Walker, 1849; Coenosia substituta Walker, 1849

= Eutrichota lipsia =

Species of insect

Eutrichota lipsia is a species of root-maggot flies in the family Anthomyiidae.
