= Eutrichota cylindrica =

Scientific classification
- Kingdom: Animalia
- Phylum: Arthropoda
- Class: Insecta
- Order: Diptera
- Family: Anthomyiidae
- Subfamily: Pegomyinae
- Tribe: Pegomyini
- Genus: Eutrichota
- Species: E. cylindrica

Binomial name
- Eutrichota cylindrica (Stein, 1898)

Synonyms
- Eremomyia cylindrica Stein, 1898

Species of fly

Eutrichota cylindrica is a species of root-maggot flies in the family Anthomyiidae.
