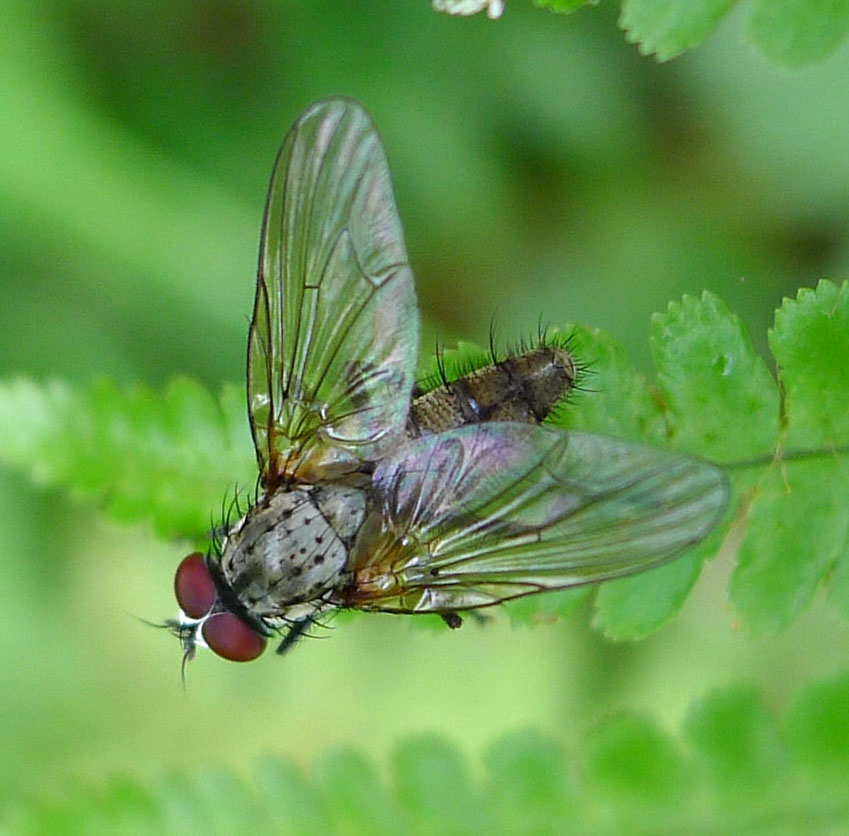

Scientific classification
- Kingdom: Animalia
- Phylum: Arthropoda
- Clade: Pancrustacea
- Class: Insecta
- Order: Diptera
- Family: Anthomyiidae
- Genus: Eustalomyia
- Species: E. festiva

Binomial name
- Eustalomyia festiva (Zetterstedt, 1845)

= Eustalomyia festiva =

Species of fly

Eustalomyia festiva is a species of root-maggot fly in the family Anthomyiidae.
