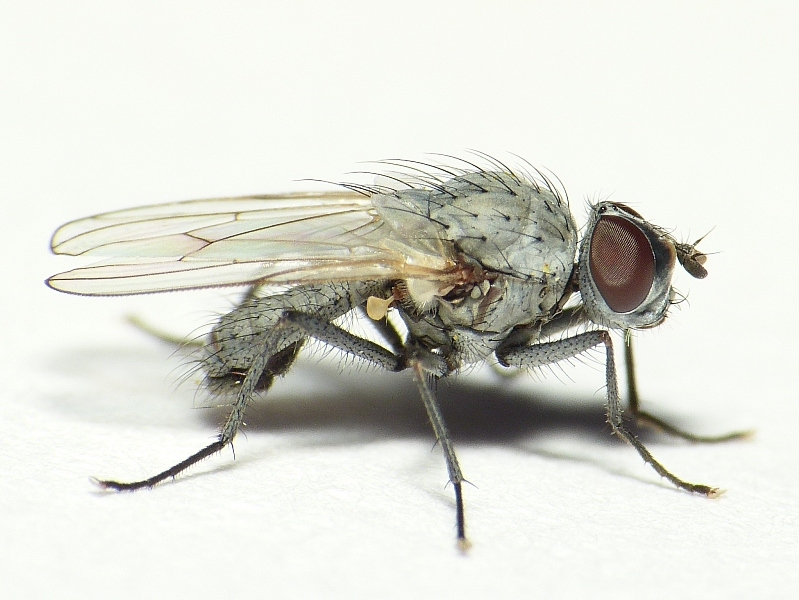
- Delia albula from the Netherlands

Scientific classification
- Kingdom: Animalia
- Phylum: Arthropoda
- Clade: Pancrustacea
- Class: Insecta
- Order: Diptera
- Family: Anthomyiidae
- Genus: Delia
- Species: D. albula

Binomial name
- Delia albula (Fallén, 1825)

Synonyms
- Musca albula Fallén, 1825; Aricia arenosa Zetterstedt, 1845; Phorbia biciliata Coquillett, 1900; Anthomyza niveipennis Zetterstedt, 1845; Delia arenosa (Zetterstedt, 1845); Aricia melanogaster Zetterstedt, 1845

= Delia albula =

Species of fly

Delia albula is a species of fly in the family Anthomyiidae. It is found in the Palearctic in Europe and North America.

For identification see:
