= Delia floralis =

Scientific classification
- Kingdom: Animalia
- Phylum: Arthropoda
- Clade: Pancrustacea
- Class: Insecta
- Order: Diptera
- Family: Anthomyiidae
- Genus: Delia
- Species: D. floralis

Binomial name
- Delia floralis (Fallén, 1824))

Synonyms
- Musca floralis Fallén, 1824; Chortophila floralis (Fallén, 1824); Phorbia floralis (Fallén, 1824)

Species of fly

Delia floralis, commonly known as the turnip root fly or summer cabbage fly, is a cosmopolitan pest of crops. The larvae or maggots feed on the roots of various plants in the family Brassicaceae.

== Morphology and biology ==
This species resembles the closely related cabbage root fly in appearance though it is slightly larger at seven to eight millimetres long. The body is light gray and the yellowish wings are transparent with yellow veins. Over most of its range, there is only one generation of this fly each year. The eggs are laid seven to ten days after the adult has emerged from the pupa. They are white and cigar-shaped and are laid in groups of thirty or forty eggs at the root collar of the host plant or on the ground nearby. Often several females lay eggs on one plant. The glossy white or yellow larvae hatch in five to fourteen days. They feed for about forty days, moulting three times, eating the young roots or tunneling into the main root of the host plant or even penetrating into the basal part of the leaves of hearting cabbage. The pupae are brown and about six millimetres in length. The insect overwinters as a pupa in the ground at a depth of five centimetres or more. The pupae can endure frosts of -33 °C and in the following year the adults emerge at varying dates, doing so when the soil temperature reaches 18 °C at the depth of the pupae.

== Distribution ==
The turnip root fly is found in Western Europe, Russia, Northeast China, Korea, Japan and North America.

== Economic significance ==
The larvae damage the roots of cabbage, turnip, radish, swede and other cruciferous crops. The growth of damaged plants is slow and development is poor resulting in a reduced yield. Large scale attacks cause cessation of growth with the plants exhibiting a leaden hue and wilting, subsequently turning yellow and dying. Control measures include the early planting of strong plants, the use of peat-compost pots, the use of additional fertilizer, deep autumn ploughing after the harvesting of cruciferous crops and insecticide treatments.

== Research ==
- A study made in 1993 investigated the behavioural and neural mechanisms involved in the oviposition behaviour of the turnip root fly.
- A study made in 2002 investigated the mortality rates of the eggs and larvae of the turnip root fly when treated with an insect pathogenic hyphomycetous fungus.
- A study made in 2008 investigated the combined effect of intercropping and attack by turnip root fly larvae on the level of glucosinolates in the host plant.
