= Eutrichota geomyis =

Scientific classification
- Domain: Eukaryota
- Kingdom: Animalia
- Phylum: Arthropoda
- Class: Insecta
- Order: Diptera
- Family: Anthomyiidae
- Genus: Eutrichota
- Species: E. geomyis

Binomial name
- Eutrichota geomyis Griffiths, 1984

Species of fly

Eutrichota geomyis is a species of root-maggot flies in the family Anthomyiidae.
