= Alliopsis angustitarsis =

Scientific classification
- Domain: Eukaryota
- Kingdom: Animalia
- Phylum: Arthropoda
- Class: Insecta
- Order: Diptera
- Family: Anthomyiidae
- Subfamily: Pegomyinae
- Tribe: Pegomyini
- Genus: Alliopsis
- Species: A. angustitarsis

Binomial name
- Alliopsis angustitarsis (Malloch, 1920)

Synonyms
- Prosalpia angustitarsis Malloch, 1920

Species of fly

Alliopsis angustitarsis is a species of root-maggot fly in the family Anthomyiidae.
