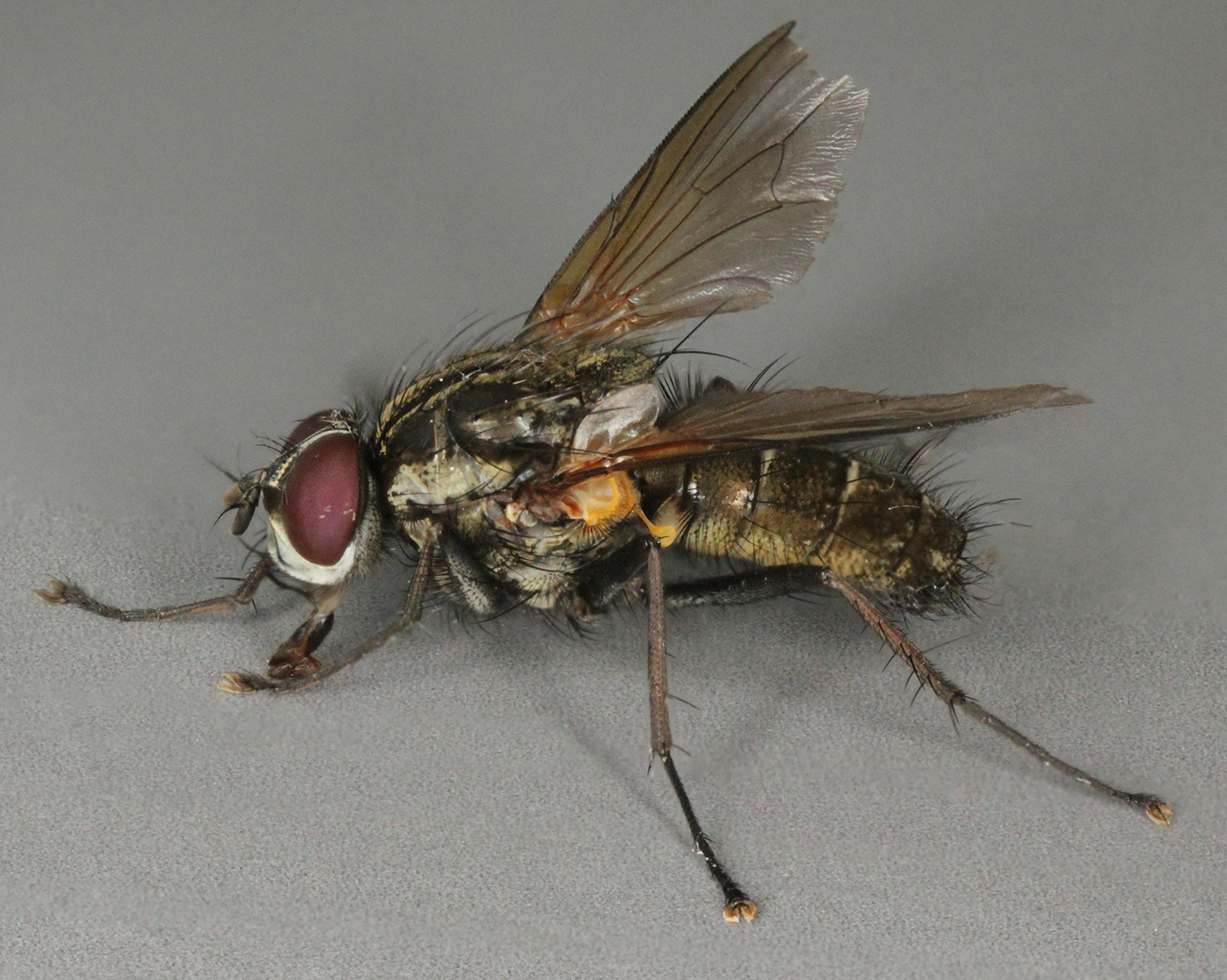
- Hydrophoria lancifer North Wales

Scientific classification
- Kingdom: Animalia
- Phylum: Arthropoda
- Class: Insecta
- Order: Diptera
- Family: Anthomyiidae
- Genus: Hydrophoria
- Species: H. lancifer

Binomial name
- Hydrophoria lancifer (Harris, [1780])

Synonyms
- Anthomyia conica Wiedemann, 1817

= Hydrophoria lancifer =

Species of fly

Hydrophoria lancifer is a species of fly in the family Anthomyiidae. It is found in the Palearctic. For identification see:
