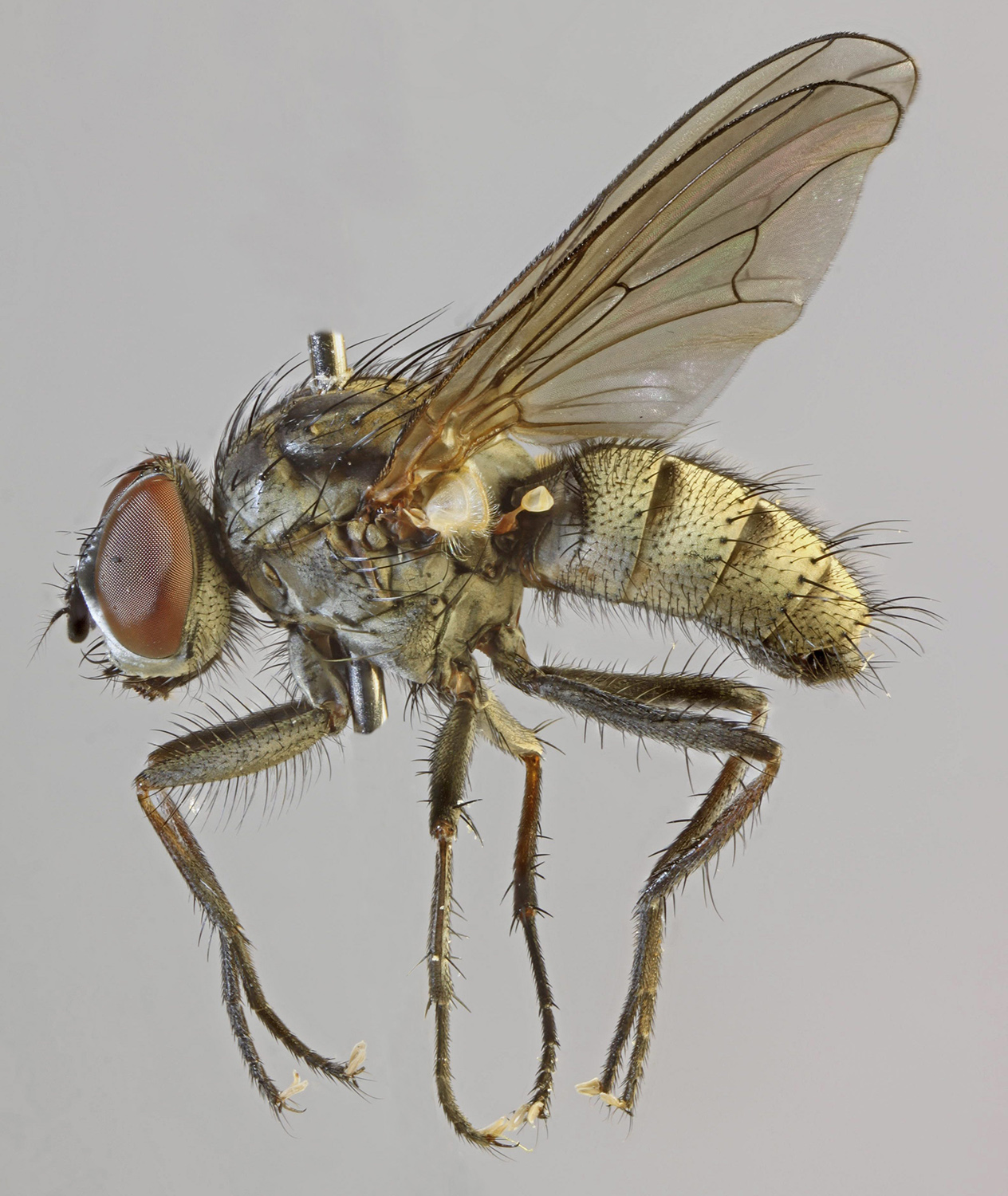
- Hydrophoria ruralis North Wales

Scientific classification
- Kingdom: Animalia
- Phylum: Arthropoda
- Class: Insecta
- Order: Diptera
- Family: Anthomyiidae
- Genus: Hydrophoria
- Species: H. ruralis

Binomial name
- Hydrophoria ruralis (Meigen, 1826)

= Hydrophoria ruralis =

Species of fly

Hydrophoria ruralis is a species of fly in the family Anthomyiidae. It is found in the Palearctic. For identification see:
