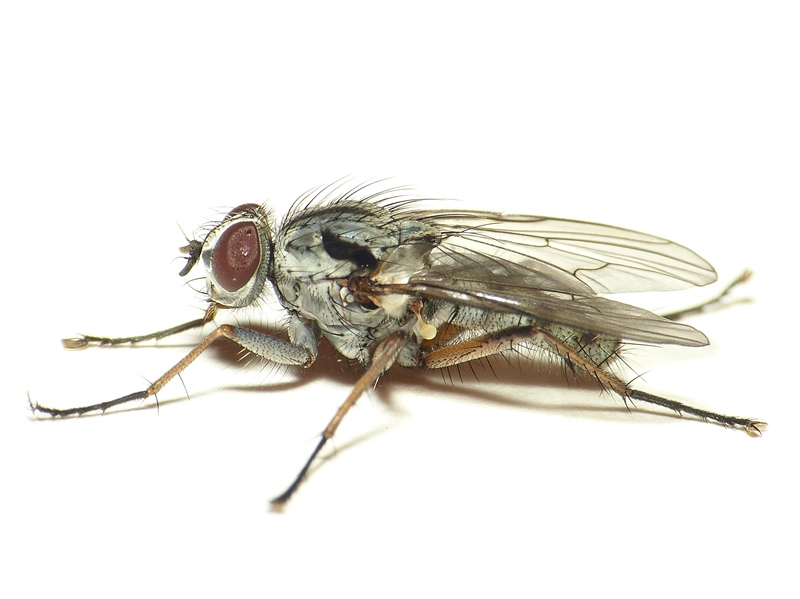

Scientific classification
- Domain: Eukaryota
- Kingdom: Animalia
- Phylum: Arthropoda
- Class: Insecta
- Order: Diptera
- Family: Anthomyiidae
- Genus: Eustalomyia
- Species: E. vittipes

Binomial name
- Eustalomyia vittipes (Zetterstedt, 1845)

Synonyms
- Anthomyza vittipes Zetterstedt, 1845; Eustalomyia steini Schroeder, 1924

= Eustalomyia vittipes =

Species of fly

Eustalomyia vittipes is a species of root-maggot fly in the family Anthomyiidae. It is found in Europe.
