= Eutrichota spinosissima =

Scientific classification
- Domain: Eukaryota
- Kingdom: Animalia
- Phylum: Arthropoda
- Class: Insecta
- Order: Diptera
- Family: Anthomyiidae
- Genus: Eutrichota
- Species: E. spinosissima

Binomial name
- Eutrichota spinosissima (Stein, 1898)

Synonyms
- Pegomyia spinosissima Stein, 1898

Species of insect

Eutrichota spinosissima is a species of root-maggot flies in the family Anthomyiidae.
