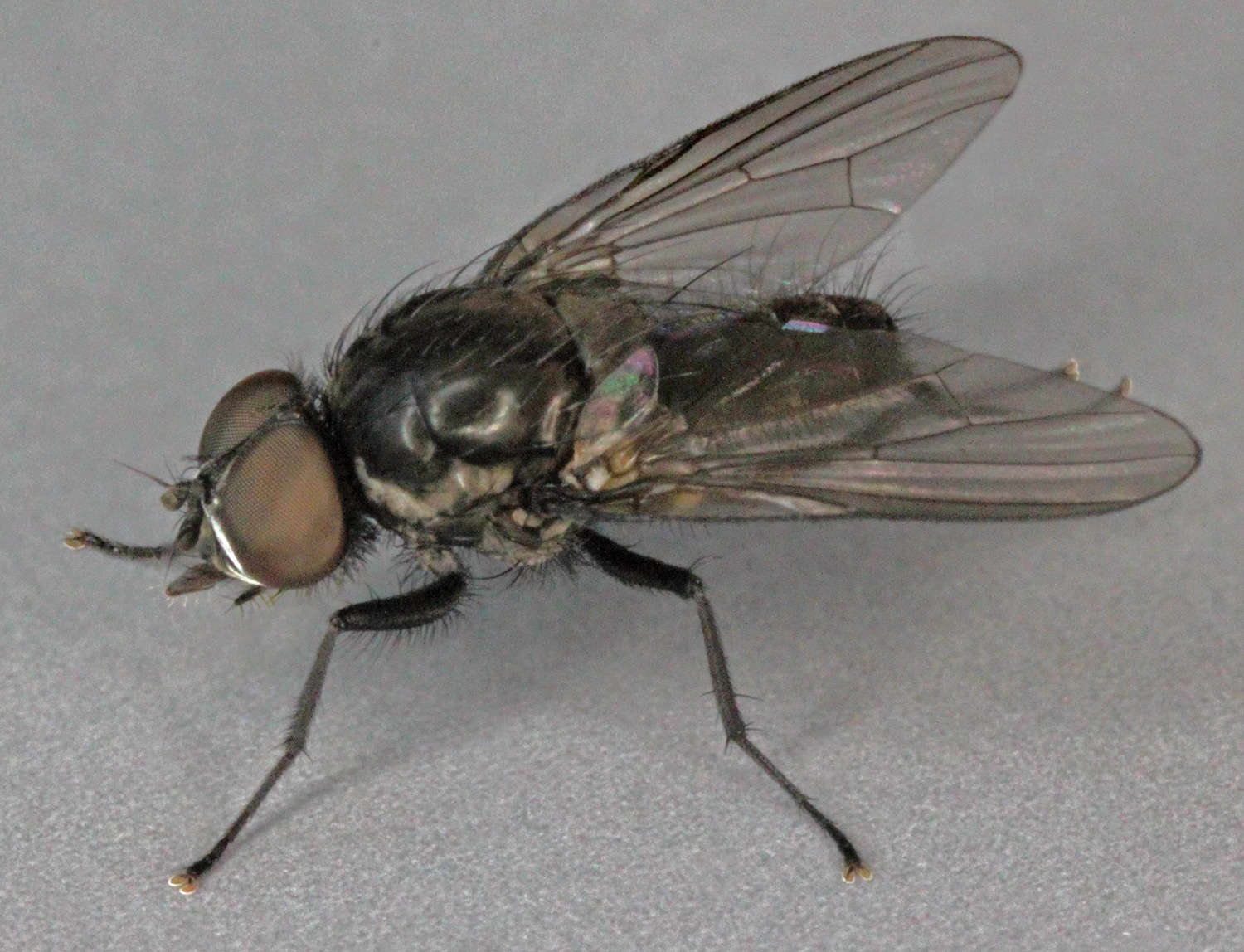
- Pegoplata aestiva North Wales.

Scientific classification
- Kingdom: Animalia
- Phylum: Arthropoda
- Class: Insecta
- Order: Diptera
- Family: Anthomyiidae
- Genus: Pegoplata
- Species: P. aestiva

Binomial name
- Pegoplata aestiva (Meigen, 1826)

= Pegoplata aestiva =

Species of fly

Pegoplata aestiva is a species of fly in the family Anthomyiidae. It is found in the Palearctic. For identification see:
