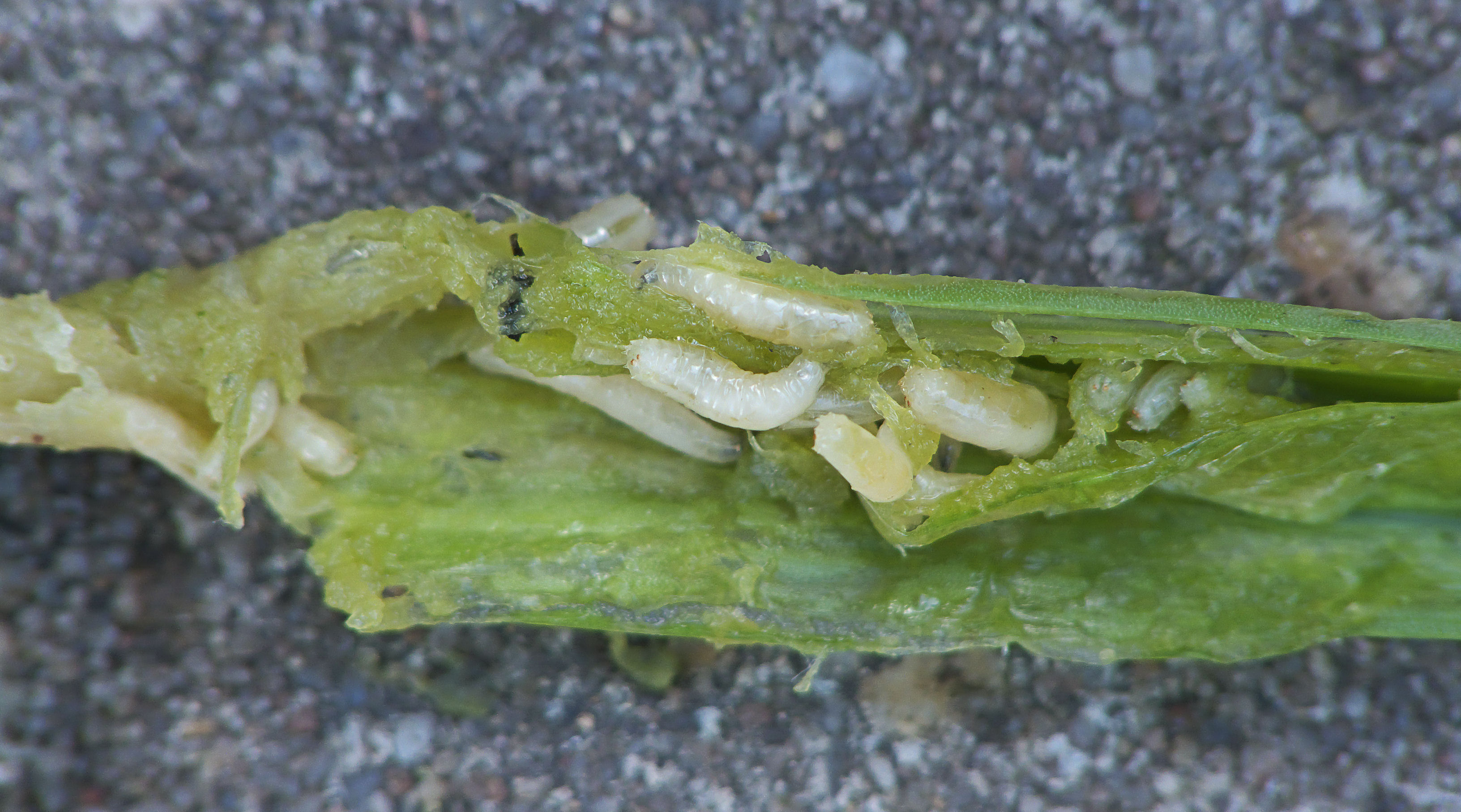
- D. antiqua larvae feeding on leeks (Allium porrum)

Scientific classification
- Kingdom: Animalia
- Phylum: Arthropoda
- Clade: Pancrustacea
- Class: Insecta
- Order: Diptera
- Family: Anthomyiidae
- Genus: Delia
- Species: D. antiqua

Binomial name
- Delia antiqua (Meigen, 1826)

Synonyms
- Anthomyia antiqua Meigen, 1826; Anthomyia ceparum Meigen, 1830; Phorbia cepetorum Meade, 1883

= Delia antiqua =

Species of insect

Delia antiqua, commonly known as the onion fly, is a cosmopolitan pest of crops. The larvae or maggots feed on onions, garlic, and other bulbous plants.

== Morphology and biology ==
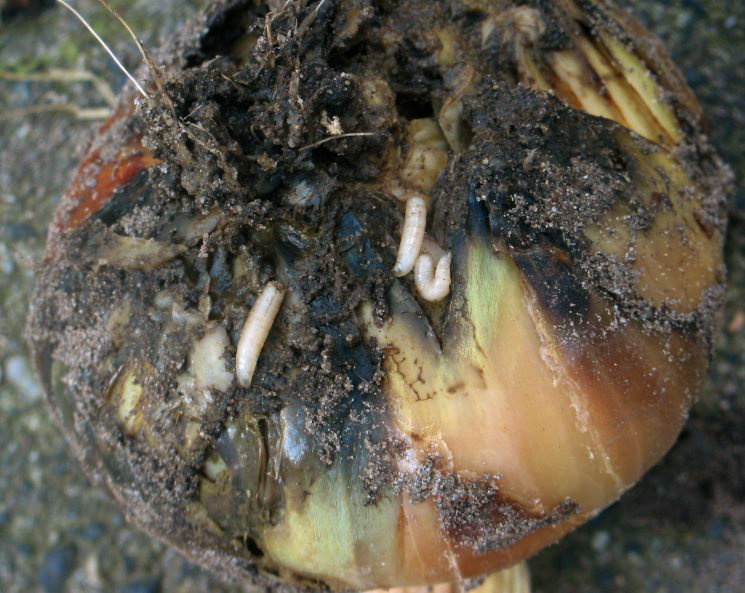
Onion damaged by D. antiqua larvae

The onion fly has an ash-grey body and resembles a housefly. The male has a longitudinal stripe on the abdomen which is lacking in the female. The legs are black, the wings transparent, and the compound eyes brown. The eggs are white and elongated and are laid in groups on the shoots, leaves, and bulbs of host plants and on the ground nearby. The larvae are white and cylindrical and hatch in 3 to 8 days. Each batch of larvae tends to keep together and collectively create large cavities in bulbs. More than 50 maggots may feed on one bulb, sometimes originating from eggs laid by several females. The larvae moult three times, feed for about 20 days, and grow to about 1.0 cm long. The pupa is brown, ringed, and ovoid and measures 7 mm (0.28 in) long. Pupation occurs in the ground with the pupal phase from the spring generation lasting two or three weeks. Late-generation pupae overwinter in the soil.

== Distribution ==
The onion fly is found in North America, Western Europe, Russia, Central Asia, China, Japan, and Korea, but is absent from deserts. In the far north of its range, it has one generation per year, but further south, two, three, or four generations may occur in one year.

== Economic significance ==
The larvae damage bulbs of onions, garlic, chives, shallots, leeks, and flowering plants. The first generation of larvae is the most harmful because it extends over a long period owing to the females' longevity and occurs when the host plants are small. Seedlings of onion and leek can be severely affected as can thinned-out onions and shallots. Less damage occurs in wet and cold springs, as this delays the development of the larvae. When plants are attacked, the leaves start to turn yellow and the bulbs rot quickly, especially in damp conditions. Control measures include crop rotation, the use of seed dressings, early sowing or planting, survey and removal of infested plants, and autumn digging of the ground to destroy the pupae.
