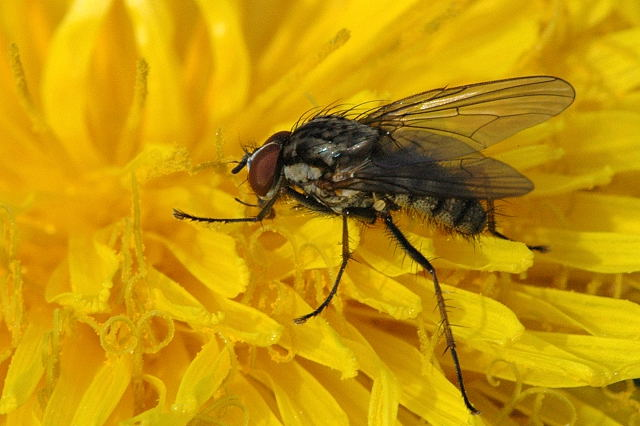
- Delia radicum

Scientific classification
- Kingdom: Animalia
- Phylum: Arthropoda
- Class: Insecta
- Order: Diptera
- Family: Anthomyiidae
- Subfamily: Anthomyiinae
- Tribe: Hydrophoriini
- Genus: Delia; Robineau-Desvoidy, 1830

Type species
- Delia floricola Robineau-Desvoidy, 1830

Synonyms
- Atrichodelia Karl, 1943; Bisetaria Karl, 1943; Chaetodelia Karl, 1943; Chortophilina Karl, 1928; Cimbotoma Lioy, 1864; Crinura Schnabl & Dziedzicki, 1911; Eroischia Lioy, 1864; Flavena Karl, 1928; Gastrolepta Lioy, 1864; Leptohylemyia Schnabl & Dziedzicki, 1911; Leucodelia Karl, 1943; Monodelia Karl, 1943; Subdelia Karl, 1943; Tricharia Karl, 1928; Trichohylemyia Karl, 1943; Trigonostoma Lioy, 1864

= Delia (fly) =

Genus of flies

Delia flies are members of the Anthomyiidae family within the superfamily Muscoidea. The identification of different species of Delia can be very difficult for non-specialists as the diagnostic characteristics used for immature and/or female specimens may be inconsistent between species. Past taxonomic keys were not as comprehensive in their identification of Delia specimens; they were either too reliant on genetic characteristics, focused solely on a specific life stage, or were focused only on certain species. However current taxonomic keys aim to be more thorough by not only including morphological diagnostics for males, females, and immature specimens of various species, but also their genetic make-up or molecular barcode.

Certain Delia species are of great economic importance as they are agricultural pests. The larvae of these flies, which tunnel into roots and stems of host plants, can cause considerable yield losses. Although most members of this genus have larvae that feed on stems, flowers, roots, and fruits of plants, a few others have larvae that are leaf miners. As herbivores, Delia flies can be categorized as a generalist or a specialist depending on their diet. Those that can eat and safely digest a wide variety of plants are known as generalists, whereas those that feed on one sole plant type are known as specialists. Specialists typically have the ability to tolerate and/or enzymatically detoxify the harmful allelochemicals produced by the plants they feed on. Common specialist species that are detrimental to crops include D. radicum (cabbage fly) and D. floralis (turnip root fly), which feed on the roots and/or leaves of Brassica crops, D. antiqua (onion fly), D. platura (seed-corn fly), D. florilega (bean-seed fly), which feed on allium roots and leaves, and D. coarctata (wheat-bulb flies) which feed on cereals.

== Geographical distribution ==
The genus Delia contains approximately 300–340 species worldwide (excluding Neotropical species). At present about 170 species are recorded from the Palaearctic region, and 162 species from the Nearctic region, 44 of which are Holarctic. Afrotropical fauna includes 20 Delia species. Griffiths described 49 new species in his recent revision of the Nearctic species, nearly a third of the present Nearctic total, and similar intensive revisions in other parts of the world are expected to produce many more, especially in the Middle East, mountainous regions of Central Asia, Nepal, and Mongolia.

== Biology ==
Morphologically speaking, adult Delia flies resemble the common housefly and species possess subtle differences in size, colouring, and location and length of bristles throughout the body. Furthermore, male and female flies experience minor sexual dimorphism.

The larvae of Delia have three larval instar stages, and the morphology of the larval tubercles and spiracles are used to differentiate between species. As the larvae of Delia flies attach and feed on various plant parts, each of their three larval instars have a specialized respiratory system to facilitate survival within the aqueous and acidic environment of the putrefying host plant. The third larval instar is commonly used for identification purposes of species that are of economic importance.

The eggs of Delia specimens are generally white in colour and elongated ovular in shape with distinctive hatching pleats on the surface of the egg, which are unique to each species.

== Agricultural pest ==
Six species of Delia (D. antiqua, D. floralis, D. florilega, D. planipalpis, D. platura, D. radicum) are common agricultural pests during their larval stage, causing severe economic loss throughout North America and Europe. The most notable species are D. radicum and D. antiqua.

Delia radicum larvae, commonly known as cabbage maggot, has caused significant damage by feeding and burrowing within the roots of members of the Brassica family including cabbage (Brassica oleracea), canola (Brassica napus), rutabaga (Brassica napobrassica), broccoli (Brassica oleracea var. italica), cauliflower (Brassica oleracea var. botrytis), turnip (Brassica rapa subsp. rapa), and radish (Raphanus sativus).

Delia antiqua larvae, commonly known as the onion maggot, is a prominent agricultural pest on members of the Allium genus including onions (Allium cepa), garlics (Allium sativum), chives (Allium schoenoprasum), shallots (Allium cepa var. aggregatum), and leeks (Allium porrum).

Gravid females will oviposit in the soil near the crops or on the host plant itself, and when the eggs hatch the larvae cause extensive damage to the plants when they feed. For example, D. radicum maggots feeding on the roots of canola crops cause damage to the plants’ phloem, periderm, and xylem parenchyma. Damage to the phloem and xylem tissue can disrupt the transportation of photosynthetic products and water, respectively. Additionally, this damage can also lead to vulnerabilities against pathogenic microorganisms. If the root damage is severe enough it can lead to a variety of issues including stunted growth, lodging, decreased flowering, decreased size and yield of seeds, or plant death.

There are many factors that will affect the susceptibility of a plant to Delia oviposition, and subsequent larval infestation. These factors include the species or variety of plant, the morphology of certain plant parts (root shape and size, wax levels on leaves, colour of foliage), and the physiology (age, chemical composition of certain secondary plant substances). For example, as a specialist of cruciferous crops, D. radicum, is attracted to the organic compound isothiocyanates found in these variety of plants in order to identify it as a suitable host. In addition to being attracted to the olfactory cues of this type of plant, visual cues such as colour, position, and visual prominence of the flowers influence which plant they will infest. In addition to the plant itself, studies with D. radicum and D. floralis have shown that other environmental factors such as soil moisture, average daily air temperature, and total precipitation can all have a positive correlation with the crop’s susceptibility to infestation.

== Current pest control management ==
=== Cultural controls ===
==== Crop hygiene ====
Good crop hygiene is one cultural control used to minimize Delia infestations, particularly D. antiqua and D. radicum. Studies have shown that damaged or crushed onion bulbs left behind after harvest were major sources of D. antiqua food and an overwintering site. Damaged plants release volatile chemicals that attract gravid females while the wounds on the plants provide easy access to newly emerged larvae. As such, removing waste crop material from harvested fields is recommended to decrease overwintering populations. Cull piles of harvested onions and volunteer plants from onion fields were originally believed to also be a major source of infestation and thus must be protected against the flies. However, recent studies have observed that neither of these sites are important infestation sources as conditions within deep cull piles are unfavourable to larval survival and larvae are unable to establish on undamaged volunteer plants in the spring.

==== Crop rotation ====
Crop rotations are often used to avoid the depletion of soil nutrients and the buildup of soil pathogens. However, crop rotation can serve to geographically distance a crop from known locations of Delia populations by planting a crop from a different plant family following the harvest of the host crop favoured by the pest. While crop rotation may be effective on certain soil- inhabiting pests that have low mobility and low dispersal capabilities, this practice is not commonly seen as a control for specialist Delia species such as D. radicum and D. antiqua since they can disperse 2000–3000 meters from the site of infestation and can have a wide host range.

==== Crop and soil covers ====
Covering seed beds with a physical material, such as cheesecloth, or covering the soil of crops with tarred felt discs can prevent gravid Delia flies from laying their eggs on the crop. Covering crops as a cultural control may also complement and improve the use of biological controls such as entomopathogenic fungi and nematodes as it produces a high-humidity climate that is favourable to these pathogens. However, completely covering crops is not a common practice as the crop covers were found to damage crop growth, can be expensive, and are time consuming to install and remove.

==== Sowing, planting, and harvesting times ====
Establishing appropriate times to sow or plant crops has multiple benefits as a cultural control. Primarily, the goal is to avoid invasion by the pest, reduce crop vulnerability to oviposition, and decrease infection from insect vectors. By sowing or planting at specific times during the growing season, plants are mature enough to tolerate low levels of attack from pests, and farmers have enough time to compensate for crops that have been damaged or destroyed. Additionally, choosing a planting time when weather conditions are unfavourable to pests or synchronized with the emergence of natural enemies of the pests can also mitigate pest populations.

=== Chemical controls ===
==== Insecticides ====
In the past, chemical insecticides were used extensively to prevent Delia infestations. These insecticides were primarily organochlorines, organophosphates, and chlorinated hydrocarbons. However, the chemicals used were generally hazardous to the environment and thus are banned or under review and could be banned. Furthermore, in some cases, such as D. antiqua flies in the Netherlands, the pests developed a resistance to the insecticides and crops continued to be destroyed. This rise in resistance and the hazard to the environment has prompted the search for a biological control instead.

=== Genetic controls ===
==== Sterile insect technique ====
The sterilization of insects in order to minimize population numbers can be accomplished either by using chemosterilants on laboratory reared males and then releasing them into the fields (SIT) or using chemosterilants on existing populations in the field. Chemosterilants used in some studies include tepa [tris-(l -aziridinyl) phosphine oxide] which is very effective at sterilizing adult flies but less so on eggs.

The effectiveness of sterilization to as a genetic control against Delia spp. populations has had mixed results. One study revealed that when chemosterilants were used on exiting populations of D. radicum, multiple factors, such as the tendency for females to disperse, reduction in the competitiveness of sterile males, and the failure of males to re-disperse once sterilized, all limited the population of sterility in field insects therefore not decreasing oviposition rates. Furthermore, other studies that performed SIT using chemosterilants on laboratory reared D. radicum males instead of existing populations found that they were no more effective despite releasing significantly more sterile males.

Contrastingly, other studies in the Netherlands have recorded more success in sterilizing D. antiqua without lowering their competitiveness and thus were able to outcompete the wild population. However, this method requires that the sterile flies are released for at least five years before they start having a significant effect on population numbers. Additionally, SIT projects on D. antiqua in Quebec have also shown a reduction in fertile adult populations, and the continuation of this technique is expected to result in a decrease in both the release rates of sterile insects and the overall cost of the program.

=== Biological controls ===
==== Parasitoids ====
Studies have shown that there are three abundant and widely distributed parasitoids of Delia species - Trybliographa rapae, Aleochara bilineata, and Aleochara bipustulata.

Trybliographa rapae is a parasitic wasp from the Figitidae family. The larvae of these wasps are a koinobiont endoparasite to several species of Delia including D. radicum, D. floralis, and D. platura. As Delia larvae feed on the roots of cruciferous plants and other crops, they damage the tissue which then induces the plant to emit volatile compounds. These volatiles act as chemical cues to attract predators and parasitoids of the herbivore feeding on the plant as a defensive measure. Female T. rapae are attracted to these signals and use them to identify the location of Delia larvae. Once attracted to the infested crops, T. rapae females may use antennal searching, ovipositor probing, or vibrotaxis to locate the Delia larvae buried within the plant and lay their eggs within them. Trybliographa rapae may parasitize any of the three larval instars of Delia.

Aleochara bilineata is a rove beetle within the Staphylinidae family. The adult specimens are a dominant predator of the eggs and larvae of D. radicum, D. platura, D. floralis, and D. planipalis. Additionally, the first instar larvae of A. bilineata are ectoparasites of the Delia pupae. Female A. bilineata will oviposit near the roots of the cruciferous crops, where Delia larvae are most likely to be found, and once the eggs hatch, the parasitic instars will chew an entrance hole on the vulnerable puparial wall wherein it will feed on the pupae within and undergoes two more instar stages before pupating. The emergence of A. bilineata is synchronized with the egg laying of Delia species since the first instars of A. bilineata may overwinter within the host pupae in order to emerge as adult in the warmer weather of spring. Competition occurs between A. bilineata and T. rapae, which has been shown to be harmful to both specimens, but particularly T. rapae.

Aleochara bipustulata is another species of rove beetle that is a predator to Delia spp. however much smaller than that of A. bilineata. Its life cycle is very similar to that of A. bilineata, but overall it is significantly less abundant and is currently not found in North America. As opposed to other predators, A. bipustulata favours D. platura instead of D. radicum as the puparial wall is much thinner. However, some specimens were found in smaller pupae of D. radicum and rarely found in D. floralis, as these larvae are significantly larger than other Delia species.

Two other parasitic wasps of Delia species were found in North America, Phygadeuon sp. and Aphaereta sp., however, their presence were so scarce that it is suggested that they may have a more favoured host other than the root maggots.

==== Entomopathogenic fungi ====
Application of entomopathogenic fungus as a biological control may involve spraying conidia on crops at the onset of egg hatching so that the fungus is present in the soil to reduce larval populations, ideally before they penetrate the plants.

While multiple species of fungi have been identified to kill Delia species, and therefore may possibly act as a biological control, there are several problems associated with using entomopathogenic fungi effectively. First, while fungal pathogens may thrive in controlled laboratory settings and are successful in killing larvae and/or adults, they may be incredibly susceptible to fluctuating environmental factors, such as temperature and moisture, which can alter their efficacy as a biological control.

Second, the glucosinolates produced by brassicaceous plants when they are physically damaged, infected or fed on by pests will be converted into isothiocyanates. Isothiocyanates are chemical compounds that can be toxic to pathogenic fungi which can result in inhibition of germination and growth. Studies have suggested that isothiocyanates can cause fungicidal activity by directly interacting with the fungal spores or indirectly through a three-trophic-level interaction mediated by the host insect.

Studies of laboratory experiments have observed that Metarhizium anisopliae, Beauveria bassiana, and Paecilomyces fumosoroseus are all pathogenic to the second and third larval instars of D. radicum and D. floralis. Metarhizium anisopliae affects larvae directly exposed during application and larvae that came into contact with the fungus in the soil post-application. Entomophthora muscae is another entomopathogenic fungi that thrives in warm, moist environments, and can infect and kill adult Delia flies, primarily D. antiqua. Strongwell-sea castrans, a fungus commonly found in Europe as opposed to North America, is known to sterilize the adult flies of D. radicum.

==== Entomopathogenic nematodes ====
Entomopathogenic nematodes are parasitic worms that have potential as a biological control agent as they have gram-negative, asporous, entomopathogenic bacteria which can infect and subsequently kill a wide variety of insect hosts, including Delia spp. The nematodes enter the insect host through openings such as the mouth, anus, and spiracles, and once inside the body cavity will release bacteria, e.g. Xenorhabdus nematophilus and Xenorhabdus luminescens, which will proliferate within the insect’s hemocoel causing death. If nematodes are applied to the soil where the Delia eggs are laid, the larvae that hatch will be directly exposed to the nematodes.

Studies have shown that both pupae and adults of D. radicum and D. antiqua were susceptible to nematodes Steinernema feltiae and Heterorhabditis bacteriophora, with D. antiqua showing greater mortality than D. radicum. However, since these studies were performed under laboratory conditions that favoured the nematode and were suboptimal to the insect host, the effectiveness of nematodes as a biological control may not be fully replicated in the field.

== Common species ==
Table 1: Nomenclature of the most significant agricultural pests of Delia flies
Scientific Nomenclature	Common name	Other Nomenclature
Delia antiqua (Meigen, 1826)	Onion maggot/fly	Hylemyia antiqua Hylemya antiqua
Delia coarctata (Fallén, 1925)	Wheat Bulb maggot/fly	Hylemia garbiglietti (Rondani) Hylemya coarctata (Fallén)
Delia floralis (Fallén, 1924)	Turnip maggot/fly	Hylemyia crucifera (Huckett) Hylemya crucifera Hylemya floralis
Delia florilega (Zetterstedt, 1845)	Bean Seed maggot/fly	Hylemya trichodactyla (Rondani) Hylemyia trichodactyla Delia liturata (Meigen) Hylemya liturata.
Delia planipalpis (Stein, 1898)	None	Hylemya planipalpis Hylemyia planipalpis
Delia platura (Meigen, 1826)	Seed-corn maggot/fly	Hylemya platura Chortophila cilicrura (Rondani) Hylemya cilicrura Hylemyia cilicrura
Delia radicum (Linnaeus, 1758)	Cabbage maggot/fly	Hylemya brassicae (Bouché) Hylemyia brassicae Erioischa brassicae.

== Species list ==
These species belong to the genus Delia

- Delia abruptiseta (Ringdahl, 1935)
- Delia absidata Xue & Du, 2008
- Delia abstracta (Huckett, 1965)
- Delia abundepilosa Hennig, 1974
- Delia acadiana Griffiths, 1991
- Delia aconiti (Ringdahl, 1948)
- Delia aemene (Walker, 1849)
- Delia alaba (Walker, 1849)
- Delia alaskana (Huckett, 1966)
- Delia alatavensis Hennig, 1974
- Delia albula (Fallén, 1825)
- Delia alternata (Huckett, 1951)
- Delia ancylosurstyla Xue, 2002
- Delia andersoni (Malloch, 1924)
- Delia angusta (Stein, 1898)
- Delia angustaeformis (Ringdahl, 1933)
- Delia angustifrons (Meigen, 1826)
- Delia angustissima (Stein, 1907)
- Delia angustiventralis (Huckett, 1965)
- Delia angustiventris (Zetterstedt, 1845)
- Delia aniseta (Stein, 1920)
- Delia annularis Tiensuu, 1946
- Delia antiqua (Meigen, 1826)
- Delia apicifloralis Xue, 2002
- Delia aquitima (Huckett, 1929)
- Delia arambourgi (Séguy, 1938)
- Delia arenicola Griffiths, 1991
- Delia armata (Stein, 1920)
- Delia atrifrons Fan, 1982
- Delia attenuata (Malloch, 1920)
- Delia augusta (Huckett, 1965)
- Delia auricolor Suwa, 1974
- Delia aurosialata Fan, 1993
- Delia bacilligera Hennig, 1974
- Delia banksiana Griffiths, 1991
- Delia beringiana Griffiths, 1993
- Delia bernardinensis Griffiths, 1991
- Delia bifascinata Griffiths, 1992
- Delia bipartita Suwa, 1977
- Delia bipartitoides Michelsen, 2007
- Delia bisciliata (Emden, 1941)
- Delia bisetosa (Stein, 1907)
- Delia bracata (Rondani, 1866)
- Delia brassicaeformis (Ringdahl, 1926)
- Delia brevipalpis Xue & Zhang, 1996
- Delia brunnescens (Zetterstedt, 1845)
- Delia bucculenta (Coquillett, 1904)
- Delia byersi Griffiths, 1993
- Delia caledonica Assis-Fonseca, 1966
- Delia calviloba Griffiths, 1993
- Delia cameroonica (Ackland, 2008)
- Delia canalis Fan & Wu, 1984
- Delia canariensis Hennig, 1974
- Delia capdellae Michelsen, 2012
- Delia capensis (Malloch, 1924)
- Delia capito (Coquillett, 1902)
- Delia cardui (Meigen, 1826)
- Delia carduiformis (Schnabl in Schnabl & Dziedzicki, 1911)
- Delia carri Griffiths, 1991
- Delia cerealis (Gillette, 1904)
- Delia chillcotti Griffiths, 1993
- Delia chirisana Suh & Kwon, 1986
- Delia chortophilina (Hennig, 1969)
- Delia cilifera (Malloch, 1918)
- Delia cilitarsis Hennig, 1974
- Delia clandestina Griffiths, 1991
- Delia clavata Griffiths, 1993
- Delia coarctata (Fallén, 1825)
- Delia coarctoides Michelsen, 2007
- Delia coei Ackland, 1967
- Delia commixta (Séguy, 1925)
- Delia concorda (Huckett, 1966)
- Delia conjugata Deng & Li, 1994
- Delia conversatoides Xue & Zhang, 1996
- Delia coronariae (Hendel, 1925)
- Delia cortesiana Griffiths, 1991
- Delia cregyoglossa (Huckett, 1965)
- Delia crinita Hennig, 1974
- Delia criniventris (Zetterstedt, 1860)
- Delia cuneata Tiensuu, 1946
- Delia cupricrus (Walker, 1849)
- Delia curvipes (Malloch, 1918)
- Delia curvistylata Suwa, 2013
- Delia cyclocerca Hsue, 1981
- Delia danae Griffiths, 1992
- Delia dentiaedeagus Xue & Du, 2017
- Delia deviata (Huckett, 1965)
- Delia diluta (Stein, 1916)
- Delia discalis (Séguy, 1925)
- Delia dissimilipes (Huckett, 1965)
- Delia diversa (Wiedemann, 1830)
- Delia dolichosternita Cao, Liu & Xue, 1985
- Delia dovreensis Ringdahl, 1954
- Delia duplicipectina Fan, 1993
- Delia echinata (Séguy, 1923)
- Delia echinopyga Suwa, 1974
- Delia egleformis (Huckett, 1929)
- Delia elongata (Pokorny, 1889)
- Delia endorsina Ackland, 2008
- Delia euremena Griffiths, 1991
- Delia eurymetopa Griffiths, 1993
- Delia expansa Suh & Kwon, 1985
- Delia extensa (Huckett, 1951)
- Delia extenuata (Huckett, 1952)
- Delia fabricii (Holmgren, 1872)
- Delia falciforceps Xue & Zhang, 1996
- Delia fallax (Loew, 1873)
- Delia fasciventris (Ringdahl, 1933)
- Delia felsicanalis Fan & Wu, 1984
- Delia fimbrifascia Xue & Du, 2009
- Delia flavibasis (Stein, 1903)
- Delia flavicommixta Xue & Zhang, 1996
- Delia flavipes Tian & Ma, 1999
- Delia flavitibiella Hennig, 1974
- Delia flavogrisea (Ringdahl, 1926)
- Delia floraliformis Hennig, 1974
- Delia floralis (Fallén, 1824)
- Delia floricola Robineau-Desvoidy, 1830
- Delia florilega (Zetterstedt, 1845)
- Delia formosana Suwa, 1994
- Delia fracta (Malloch, 1918)
- Delia frontella (Zetterstedt, 838])
- Delia frontulenta (Huckett, 1929)
- Delia fulvescens (Huckett, 1966)
- Delia fulviposticrus Li & Deng, 1981
- Delia gallica Hennig, 1974
- Delia gansuensis Fan, 1988
- Delia garretti (Huckett, 1929)
- Delia giresunensis Hennig, 1974
- Delia glabritheca (Huckett, 1966)
- Delia gracilibacilla Chen, 1982
- Delia gracilipes (Malloch, 1920)
- Delia gracilis (Stein, 1907)
- Delia groenlandica Griffiths, 1993
- Delia heraclei Griffiths, 1993
- Delia hirticrura (Rondani, 1871)
- Delia hirtitibia (Stein, 1916)
- Delia hohxiliensis Xue & Zhang, 1996
- Delia hudsonica Griffiths, 1993
- Delia hystricosternita Hsue, 1981
- Delia impilosa Suwa, 1977
- Delia inconspicua (Huckett, 1924)
- Delia ineptifrons (Huckett, 1951)
- Delia integralis (Huckett, 1965)
- Delia interflua (Pandellé, 1900)
- Delia intimata (Huckett, 1965)
- Delia ismayi (Ackland, 2008)
- Delia jilinensis Chen, 1988
- Delia judicariae (Pokorny, 1893)
- Delia kigeziana (Emden, 1941)
- Delia kullensis (Ringdahl, 1933)
- Delia kumatai Suwa, 1977
- Delia lamellicauda (Huckett, 1952)
- Delia lamelliseta (Stein, 1900)
- Delia lamellisetoides Hsue, 1981
- Delia lasiosternum (Huckett, 1965)
- Delia latifrons (Ackland, 1971)
- Delia latissima (Fan, Ma & Li, 1982)
- Delia lavata (Boheman, 1863)
- Delia leechi Griffiths, 1993
- Delia leptinostylos (Huckett, 1965)
- Delia leucophoroides Griffiths, 1991
- Delia linearis (Stein, 1898)
- Delia lineariventris (Zetterstedt, 1845)
- Delia lobistyla Griffiths, 1991
- Delia longiabdomina Xue & Du, 2017
- Delia longiarista Xue, 2002
- Delia longicauda (Strobl, 1898)
- Delia longicercula Yudin, 1976
- Delia longimastica Xue & Zhang, 1996
- Delia longisetigera Fan, 1984
- Delia longitheca Suwa, 1974
- Delia lophota (Pandellé, 1900)
- Delia lupini (Coquillett, 1901)
- Delia lupinoides Griffiths, 1993
- Delia mackinleyana Griffiths, 1993
- Delia madagascariensis (Ackland, 2008)
- Delia madoensis Fan, 1988
- Delia majuscula (Pokorny, 1889)
- Delia manitobensis Griffiths, 1992
- Delia martini Griffiths, 1993
- Delia mastigella Xue & Zhang, 1996
- Delia mastigophalla Xue, Wang & Li, 1993
- Delia megacephala (Huckett, 1966)
- Delia megatricha (Kertész, 1901)
- Delia metatarsata (Stein, 1914)
- Delia mexicana Griffiths, 1991
- Delia micans Griffiths, 1991
- Delia minutigrisea Xue & Zhang, 1996
- Delia montana (Malloch, 1919)
- Delia montezumae (Griffiths, 1991)
- Delia monticola (Huckett, 1966)
- Delia montium Hennig, 1974
- Delia montivagans (Huckett, 1952)
- Delia mutans (Huckett, 1929)
- Delia nemoralis (Huckett, 1965)
- Delia nemostylata Deng & Li, 1984
- Delia neomexicana (Malloch, 1918)
- Delia nepalensis Ackland, 1967
- Delia nigeriposticrus Xue & Du, 2018
- Delia nigrescens (Rondani, 1877)
- Delia nigriabdominis Xue, 2001
- Delia nigribasis (Stein, 1907)
- Delia nigricaudata (Huckett, 1929)
- Delia nigrihalteres Xue & Du, 2017
- Delia nigripennis Griffiths, 1991
- Delia nivalis Griffiths, 1991
- Delia normalis (Malloch, 1919)
- Delia notobata Griffiths, 1991
- Delia nubilalis (Huckett, 1966)
- Delia nudicosta (Ringdahl, 1949)
- Delia opacitas (Huckett, 1965)
- Delia oppidans (Huckett, 1929)
- Delia oregonensis Griffiths, 1991
- Delia orwelliana Griffiths, 1993
- Delia pacifica Griffiths, 1993
- Delia pallipennis (Zetterstedt, 1838)
- Delia pamirensis Hennig, 1974
- Delia pansihirta Jin & Fan, 1981
- Delia paradisi Xue, 2018
- Delia parafrontella Hennig, 1974
- Delia partivitra Fan, 1993
- Delia parvicanalis Fan, 1984
- Delia paupercula Griffiths, 1991
- Delia pectinator Suwa, 1984
- Delia pectinitibia Jin & Fan, 1981
- Delia penicillaris (Rondani, 1866)
- Delia penicillella Fan, 1984
- Delia penicilliventris Ackland, 2010
- Delia penicillosa Hennig, 1974
- Delia persica Hennig, 1974
- Delia pilicerca Suwa, 1974
- Delia pilifemur (Ringdahl, 1933)
- Delia pilimana (Stein, 1920)
- Delia piliseritibia Fan & Zheng, 1993
- Delia pilitarsis (Stein, 1920)
- Delia pilitibia (Stein, 1916)
- Delia piliventris (Pokorny, 1889)
- Delia piniloba Hsue, 1981
- Delia planipalpis (Stein, 1898)
- Delia platura (Meigen, 1826)
- Delia pluvialis (Malloch, 1918)
- Delia podagricicauda Xue, 1997
- Delia polaris Griffiths, 1991
- Delia propinquina (Huckett, 1929)
- Delia prostriata (Huckett, 1965)
- Delia pruinosa (Zetterstedt, 1845)
- Delia pseudechinata Griffiths, 1991
- Delia pseudextensa Griffiths, 1992
- Delia pseudofugax (Strobl, 1898)
- Delia pseudorainieri Griffiths, 1992
- Delia pseudoventralis (Ackland, 2008)
- Delia quadrilateralis Fan & Zhong, 1982
- Delia quadripila (Stein, 1916)
- Delia quercupinetorum Griffiths, 1993
- Delia radicum (Linnaeus, 1758)
- Delia rainieri (Huckett, 1951)
- Delia recurva (Malloch, 1919)
- Delia recurvata Fan, 1986
- Delia reliquens (Huckett, 1951)
- Delia repens Ackland, 1967
- Delia repleta (Huckett, 1929)
- Delia rimiventris Michelsen, 2007
- Delia rossica Hennig, 1974
- Delia sanctijacobi (Bigot, 1885)
- Delia saxatilis Griffiths, 1991
- Delia schistophalla Griffiths, 1991
- Delia sclerostylata Fan, 1993
- Delia scrofifacialis Xue & Zhang, 1996
- Delia segmentata (van der Wulp, 1896)
- Delia sequoiae (Huckett, 1967)
- Delia seriata (Stein, 1920)
- Delia serrulata Griffiths, 1991
- Delia seticauda Suwa, 1984
- Delia setifirma (Huckett, 1951)
- Delia setigera (Stein, 1920)
- Delia setiseriata (Huckett, 1952)
- Delia setisissima (Huckett, 1929)
- Delia setitarsata (Huckett, 1924)
- Delia setiventris (Stein, 1898)
- Delia sierricola Griffiths, 1991
- Delia sileni Michelsen, 2012
- Delia silvicola (Robineau-Desvoidy, 1830)
- Delia simpla (Coquillett, 1900)
- Delia simpliciana Yudin, 1976
- Delia simulata (Huckett, 1952)
- Delia sinuiforcipis Zhong, 1985
- Delia sobrians (Huckett, 1951)
- Delia solidilamina Fan & Zheng, 1993
- Delia sphaerobasis Fan & Qian, 1984
- Delia spicularis Fan, 1984
- Delia steiniella (Emden, 1951)
- Delia stenostyla Deng & Li, 1994
- Delia subalpina (Ringdahl, 1926)
- Delia subatrifrons Xue & Du, 2009
- Delia subconversata Du & Xue, 2018
- Delia subdolichosternita Du & Xue, 2018
- Delia subinterflua Xue & Du, 2008
- Delia submetallica Griffiths, 1992
- Delia subnemostylata Xue & Du, 2018
- Delia subnigribasis Fan & Wang, 1982
- Delia suburbana (Huckett, 1966)
- Delia subvesicata Griffiths, 1991
- Delia takizawai Suwa, 1974
- Delia taonura Deng & Li, 1994
- Delia tarsata (Ringdahl, 1918)
- Delia tarsifimbria (Pandellé, 1900)
- Delia tenuiformis Suwa, 1977
- Delia tenuipenis Fan & Zhong, 1982
- Delia tenuiventris (Zetterstedt, 1860)
- Delia terpsichore Griffiths, 1991
- Delia tibila Ackland, 2008
- Delia tiensuui (Ringdahl, 1934)
- Delia tornensis (Ringdahl, 1926)
- Delia trispinosa (Karl, 1937)
- Delia tuberisurstyla Xue & Du, 2017
- Delia tumidula (Ringdahl), 1949
- Delia turcmenica Hennig, 1974
- Delia turkestanica (Enderlein, 1934)
- Delia unduliloba Griffiths, 1993
- Delia unguitigris Xue, 1997
- Delia unica Griffiths, 1991
- Delia uniseriata (Stein, 1914)
- Delia unispina Yudin, 1976
- Delia urbana (Malloch, 1924)
- Delia ventralis (Stein, 1914)
- Delia vesicata (Huckett, 1952)
- Delia virgithorax (Stein, 1913)
- Delia vockerothi Griffiths, 1991
- Delia wangi Xue, 2018
- Delia winnemana (Malloch, 1919)
- Delia xanthobasis (Huckett, 1965)
