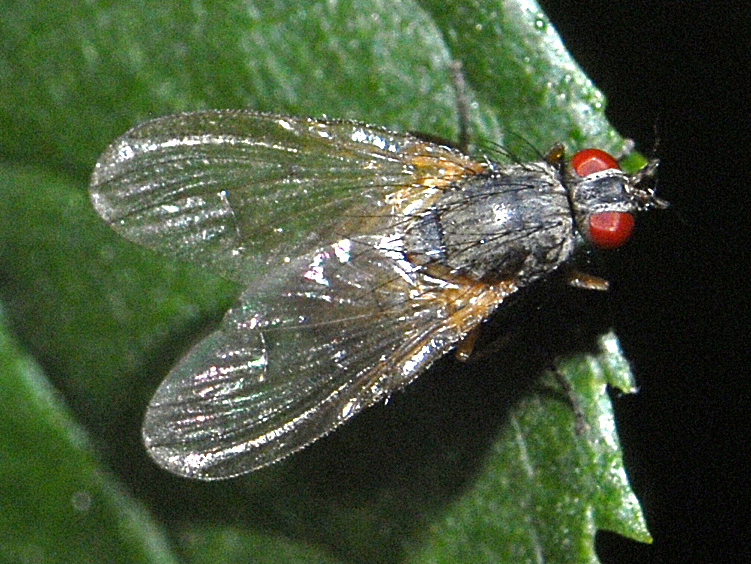
- Eutrichota sp.

Scientific classification
- Kingdom: Animalia
- Phylum: Arthropoda
- Class: Insecta
- Order: Diptera
- Family: Anthomyiidae
- Subfamily: Pegomyinae
- Tribe: Pegomyini
- Genus: Eutrichota; Kowarz, 1893

= Eutrichota =

Genus of flies

Eutrichota is a genus of flies within the family Anthomyiidae.

== Species ==
Species within this genus include:

- Eutrichota aertaica
- Eutrichota affinis
- Eutrichota albidosa
- Eutrichota anderssoni
- Eutrichota anorufa
- Eutrichota apicalis
- Eutrichota arenosa
- Eutrichota assimilis
- Eutrichota atroapicata
- Eutrichota bilobella
- Eutrichota brevirostris
- Eutrichota caduca
- Eutrichota cameroni
- Eutrichota clavata
- Eutrichota connexa
- Eutrichota conscripta
- Eutrichota costalis
- Eutrichota cylindrica
- Eutrichota duplicata
- Eutrichota epiphallica
- Eutrichota fanjingensis
- Eutrichota finitima
- Eutrichota flavicans
- Eutrichota frigida
- Eutrichota fumipennis
- Eutrichota fuscigenua
- Eutrichota fuscipes
- Eutrichota geomyis
- Eutrichota gigas
- Eutrichota gopheri
- Eutrichota hamata
- Eutrichota humeralis
- Eutrichota hymenacra
- Eutrichota impolita
- Eutrichota incompleta
- Eutrichota inornata
- Eutrichota interior
- Eutrichota labradorensis
- Eutrichota lamellata
- Eutrichota leptinophalla
- Eutrichota levipes
- Eutrichota lipsia
- Eutrichota lividiventris
- Eutrichota longimana
- Eutrichota lucescens
- Eutrichota magna
- Eutrichota major
- Eutrichota medicaginis
- Eutrichota megerlei
- Eutrichota melanderi
- Eutrichota nigrifemoralis
- Eutrichota nigrifemur
- Eutrichota nigriscens
- Eutrichota obversa
- Eutrichota occidentalis
- Eutrichota pallidolatigena
- Eutrichota pamirensis
- Eutrichota parafacialis
- Eutrichota parkeri
- Eutrichota partita
- Eutrichota pilimana
- Eutrichota pilimarginata
- Eutrichota praeclara
- Eutrichota praepotens
- Eutrichota processualis
- Eutrichota punctata
- Eutrichota quadrirecta
- Eutrichota schineri
- Eutrichota sclerotacra
- Eutrichota setosa
- Eutrichota shandanensis
- Eutrichota similis
- Eutrichota simillima
- Eutrichota socculata
- Eutrichota spinigerellus
- Eutrichota spinisoides
- Eutrichota spinosissima
- Eutrichota subbilobella
- Eutrichota substriatella
- Eutrichota sylvia
- Eutrichota tarsata
- Eutrichota texana
- Eutrichota triticiperda
- Eutrichota tunicata
- Eutrichota valida
- Eutrichota woodi
