= Hydrophoria (fly) =

Scientific classification
- Domain: Eukaryota
- Kingdom: Animalia
- Phylum: Arthropoda
- Class: Insecta
- Order: Diptera
- Family: Anthomyiidae
- Tribe: Hydrophoriini
- Genus: Hydrophoria; Robineau-Desvoidy, 1830

Genus of flies

Hydrophoria is a genus of root-maggot flies in the family Anthomyiidae. There are about twenty five described species in Hydrophoria.

== Species ==
These species belong to the genus Hydrophoria:

- Hydrophoria aberrans Stein, 1918
- Hydrophoria albiceps (Meigen, 1826)
- Hydrophoria azygos (Huckett, 1965)
- Hydrophoria bavarica Hennig, 1969
- Hydrophoria cinerascens Stein, 1907
- Hydrophoria crassiforceps Qian & Fan, 1981
- Hydrophoria diabata (Pandellé, 1899)
- Hydrophoria disticrassa Xue & Bai, 2009
- Hydrophoria ghoratobelae Suwa, 1977
- Hydrophoria hucketti Griffiths, 1998
- Hydrophoria japonica Suwa, 2002
- Hydrophoria lancifer (Harris, 1779)
- Hydrophoria linogrisea (Meigen, 1826)
- Hydrophoria longissima Fan & Zhong, 1984
- Hydrophoria lushiensis Ge & Li, 1985
- Hydrophoria megaloba Li & Deng, 1981
- Hydrophoria montana Suwa, 1970
- Hydrophoria nigrinitida Feng, 2006
- Hydrophoria plumosa Wulp, 1896
- Hydrophoria pronata Fan & Qian, 1984
- Hydrophoria robustisurstylus Feng, 2006
- Hydrophoria rufitibia Stein, 1907
- Hydrophoria ruralis (Meigen, 1826)
- Hydrophoria silvicola (Robineau-Desvoidy, 1830) [Not on some listings*]

[See * Hylemya silvicola Robineau-Desvoidy, 1830: 551]
