= Pegoplata =

Scientific classification
- Kingdom: Animalia
- Phylum: Arthropoda
- Class: Insecta
- Order: Diptera
- Family: Anthomyiidae
- Subfamily: Pegomyinae
- Tribe: Myopinini
- Genus: Pegoplata; Schnabl and Dziedzicki 1911

Type species
- Pegoplata palpata Seguy 1937

Synonyms
- Nupedia Karl ,1930; Nudaria Karl ,1928; Psiloplastinx Enderlein ,1936; Gymnogaster Lioy ,1864

Genus of flies

Pegoplata, sometimes known as Nupedia, is a genus of flies within the family Anthomyiidae.

== Species ==
- P. abnormis (Stein, 1920)
- P. acutipennis (Malloch, 1918)
- P. aestiva (Meigen, 1826)
- P. anabnormis (Huckett, 1939)
- P. arnaudi Griffiths, 1986
- P. californica Griffiths, 1986
- P. cuticornis (Huckett, 1939)
- P. dasiomma (Fan, 1982)
- P. debilis (Stein, 1916)
- P. durangensis Griffiths, 1986
- P. fulva Malloch, 1934
- P. huachucensis Griffiths, 1986
- P. infirma (Meigen, 1826)
- P. infuscata Griffiths, 1986
- P. juvenilis (Stein, 1898)
- P. laotudingga Zheng & Xue, 2002
- P. lengshanensis Xue, 2001
- P. linotaenia Ma, 1988
- P. nasuta Griffiths, 1986
- P. nevadensis Griffiths, 1986
- P. nigracaerulea (Snyder, 1952)
- P. nigroscutellata (Stein, 1920)
- P. palposa (Stein, 1897)
- P. patellans (Pandellé, 1900)
- P. peninsularis Griffiths, 1986
- P. pictipes (Bigot, 1885)
- P. setulosa Griffiths, 1986
- P. tundrica (Schnabl, 1915)
- P. valentinae (Ackland, 1971)
- P. wyomingensis Griffiths, 1986
