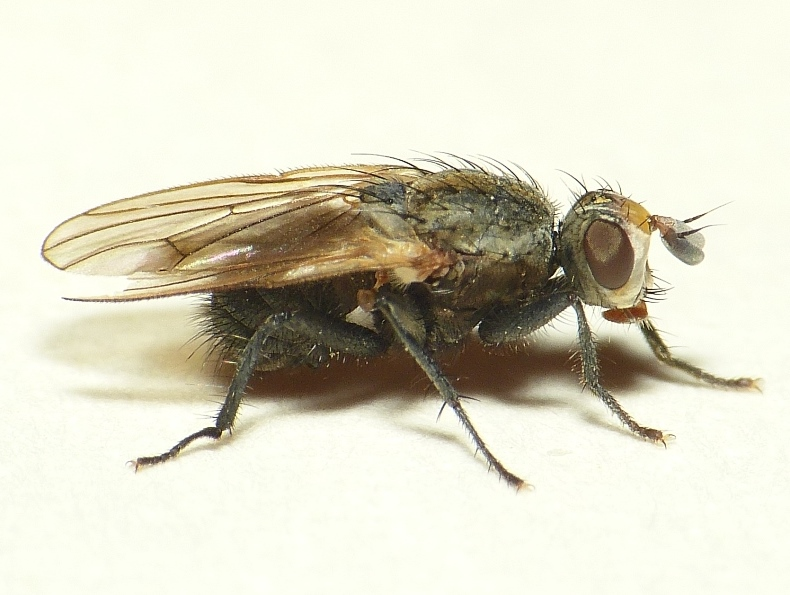
- Myopina myopina

Scientific classification
- Domain: Eukaryota
- Kingdom: Animalia
- Phylum: Arthropoda
- Class: Insecta
- Order: Diptera
- Family: Anthomyiidae
- Subfamily: Pegomyinae
- Tribe: Myopinini
- Genus: Myopina; Robineau-Desvoidy, 1830

Synonyms
- Miopina Rondani, 1866

= Myopina =

Genus of insects

Myopina is a genus of flies within the family Anthomyiidae. Members of this genus can be found in North America and Europe.

== Species ==
- Myopina crassipalpis Ringdahl, 1937
- Myopina martini Griffiths, 1986
- Myopina myopina (Fallen, 1824)
- Myopina scoparia Zetterstedi, 1845)
- Myopina variegata Stein, 1907
