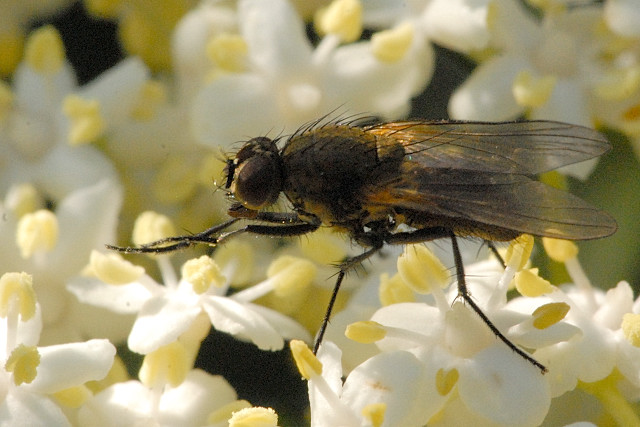

Scientific classification
- Kingdom: Animalia
- Phylum: Arthropoda
- Class: Insecta
- Order: Diptera
- Family: Anthomyiidae
- Subfamily: Pegomyinae
- Tribe: Pegomyini
- Genus: Alliopsis; Schnabl & Dziedzicki, 1911

= Alliopsis =

Genus of flies

Alliopsis is a genus of root-maggot flies in the family Anthomyiidae. There are at least 70 described species in Alliopsis.

== Species ==
These 76 species belong to the genus Alliopsis:

- Alliopsis aertaica (Qian & Fan, 1981)
- Alliopsis albipennis (Ringdahl, 1928)
- Alliopsis aldrichi (Ringdahl, 1934)
- Alliopsis angustitarsis (Malloch, 1920)
- Alliopsis arelate (Walker, 1849)
- Alliopsis arnaudi Griffiths, 1987
- Alliopsis atrifimbriae (Fan & Chen, 1983)
- Alliopsis atronitens (Strobl, 1893)
- Alliopsis attenuata Griffiths, 1987
- Alliopsis austriaca (Hennig, 1976)
- Alliopsis badia (Walker, 1849)
- Alliopsis benanderi (Ringdahl, 1926)
- Alliopsis billbergi (Zetterstedt, 1838)
- Alliopsis brevior Huckett, 1965
- Alliopsis brevitarsis (Malloch, 1918)
- Alliopsis brunetta (Huckett, 1929)
- Alliopsis brunneigena (Schnabl, 1915)
- Alliopsis conifrons (Zetterstedt, 1845)
- Alliopsis constrictor (Malloch, 1920)
- Alliopsis cordillerana Griffiths, 1987
- Alliopsis ctenostylata Li & Deng, 1981
- Alliopsis curvifemoralis Fan & Wu, 1983
- Alliopsis dasyops (Fan, 1983)
- Alliopsis delioides (Fan, 1983)
- Alliopsis denticauda (Zetterstedt, 1838)
- Alliopsis dentilamella Fan & Wu, 1983
- Alliopsis dentiventris (Ringdahl, 1918)
- Alliopsis flavipes (Fan & Cui, 1983)
- Alliopsis fractiseta (Stein, 1908)
- Alliopsis freyi (Ringdahl, 1932)
- Alliopsis fruticosa Fan, 1983
- Alliopsis genalis (Huckett, 1050)
- Alliopsis gentilis (Huckett, 1950)
- Alliopsis gigantosternita Fan, 1983
- Alliopsis glacialis (Zetterstedt, 1845)
- Alliopsis gymnophthalma Hennig, 1976
- Alliopsis hemiliostylata Fan & Wu, 1983
- Alliopsis heterochaeta Fan & Wu, 1983
- Alliopsis heterochaetoides Jin & Fan, 1983
- Alliopsis heterophalla Fan & Wu, 1983
- Alliopsis hirtitibia Huckett, 1966
- Alliopsis incompta Huckett, 1966
- Alliopsis kurahashii (Suwa, 1977)
- Alliopsis laminata (Zetterstedt, 1838)
- Alliopsis latifrons Fan & Wu, 1983
- Alliopsis littoralis (Malloch, 1920)
- Alliopsis longiceps (Ringdahl, 1935)
- Alliopsis longipennis (Ringdahl, 1918)
- Alliopsis lutebasicosta (Fan, 1983)
- Alliopsis maculifrons (Zetterstedt, 1838)
- Alliopsis magnilamella (Fan, 1983)
- Alliopsis moerens (Zetterstedt, 1838)
- Alliopsis obesa Malloch, 1919
- Alliopsis parviceps Huckett, 1965
- Alliopsis pilitarsis (Stein, 1900)
- Alliopsis plumiseta Griffiths, 1987
- Alliopsis probella Fan & Wu, 1983
- Alliopsis problella Fan & Wu, 1983
- Alliopsis pseudosilvestris Griffiths, 1987
- Alliopsis qinghoensis (Hsue, 1981)
- Alliopsis rambolitensis (Villeneuve, 1922)
- Alliopsis recta (Fan & Cui, 1983)
- Alliopsis rectiforceps Fan & Wu, 1983
- Alliopsis sepiella (Zetterstedt, 1845)
- Alliopsis silvatica (Suwa, 1974)
- Alliopsis silvestris (Fallén, 1824)
- Alliopsis similaris (Assis-Fonseca, 1966)
- Alliopsis simulivora Ackland, 2006
- Alliopsis sitiens (Collin, 1943)
- Alliopsis subsinuata Fan, 1986
- Alliopsis teriolensis (Pokorny, 1893)
- Alliopsis tinctipennis (Malloch, 1929)
- Alliopsis undulata Griffiths, 1987
- Alliopsis uniseta Griffiths, 1987
- Alliopsis varicilia (Fan & Wang, 1983)
- Alliopsis ventripalmata Fan & Wu, 1983
