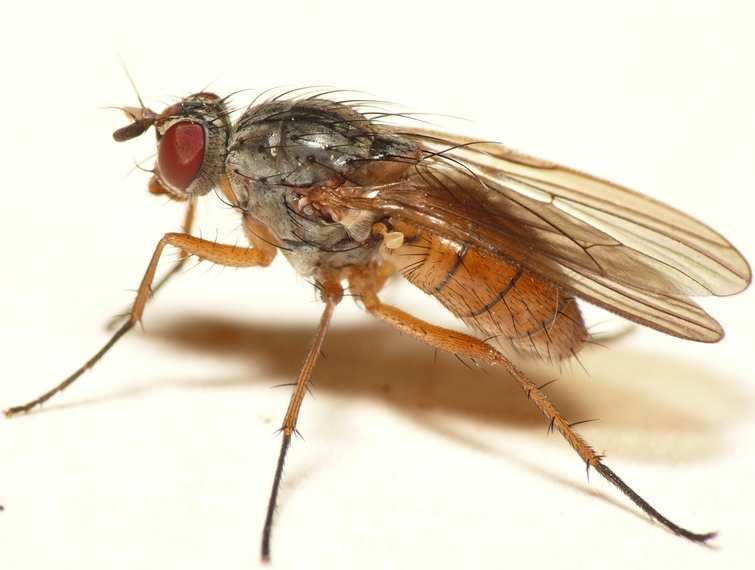
- Mycophaga testacea Netherlands

Scientific classification
- Kingdom: Animalia
- Phylum: Arthropoda
- Clade: Pancrustacea
- Class: Insecta
- Order: Diptera
- Family: Anthomyiidae
- Subfamily: Pegomyiinae
- Genus: Mycophaga; Rondani, 1856
- Species: M. testacea

Binomial name
- Mycophaga testacea (Gimmerthal, 1834)

= Mycophaga =

Genus of flies

Mycophaga testacea is a species of fly in the family Anthomyiidae. It is the only species in the genus Mycophaga. It is found in the Palearctic. For identification see:
