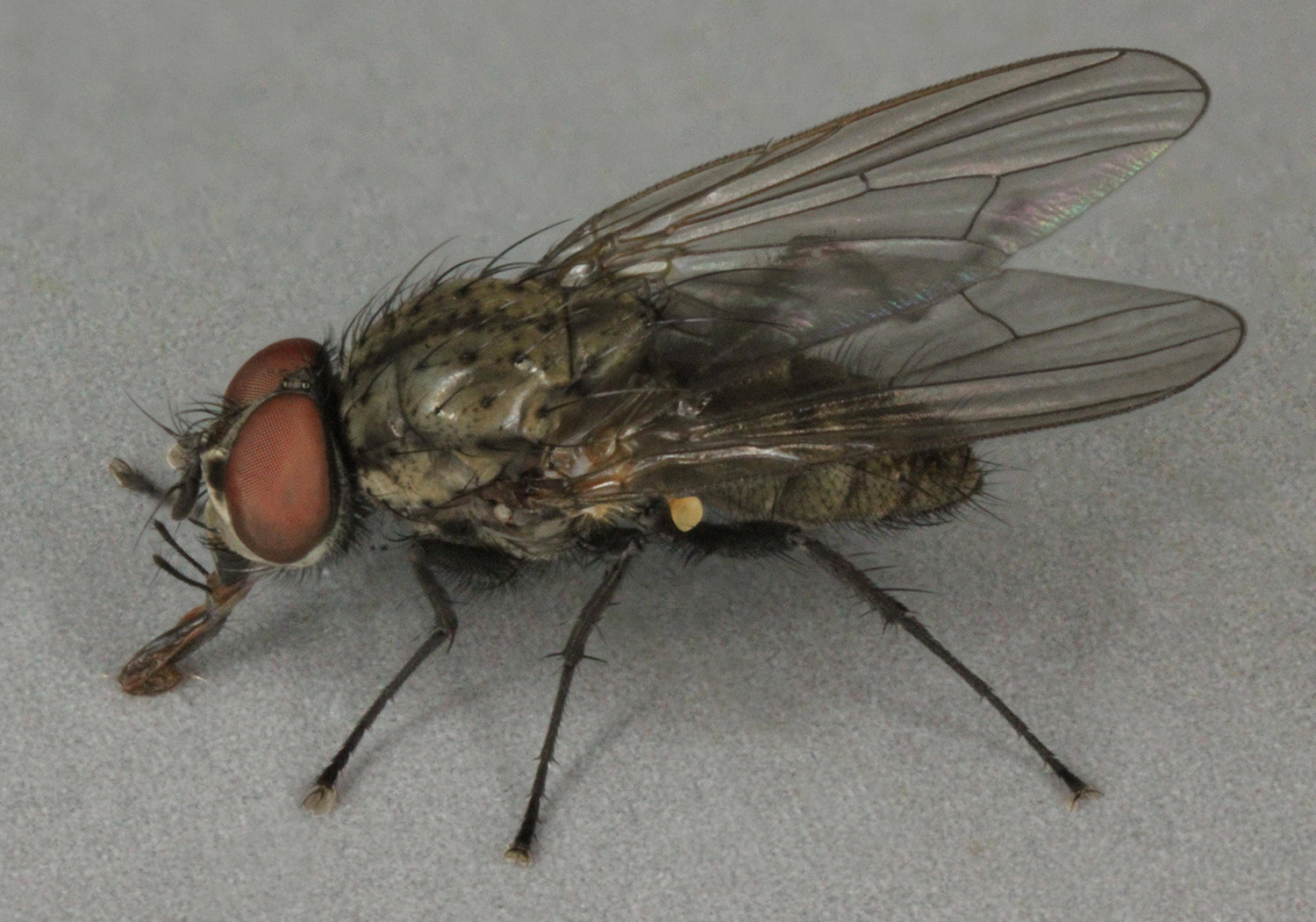
- Delia platura at Nebo, North Wales (July 2012)

Scientific classification
- Kingdom: Animalia
- Phylum: Arthropoda
- Clade: Pancrustacea
- Class: Insecta
- Order: Diptera
- Family: Anthomyiidae
- Genus: Delia
- Species: D. platura

Binomial name
- Delia platura (Meigen, 1826)

Synonyms
- Anthomyia platura Meigen, 1826; Hylemyia platura (Meigen, 1826); Chorthophila cilicrura Rondani, 1866; Chortophila cilicrura Rondani, 1866

= Delia platura =

Species of fly

Delia platura, also referred to as the seedcorn maggot and bean seed fly, is a member of the Anthomyiidae family within the order Diptera and the genus Delia. During its adult stage, it is hard to distinguish from similar fly species because it has a thin body, long legs, and transparent wings. It inhabits numerous regions globally, and is known to be an agricultural pest, especially during its larval stage, causing substantial crop damage worldwide. During the larval phase, Delia platura damages crops at its beginning stages as a seed or seedling. This damage leads to an unsuccessful sprouting and, therefore, a decrease in crop production. Furthermore, the presence of Delia platura leads to decreased biodiversity, damage to ecosystems as organisms lose food sources and habitats, and negative economic impacts because farmers must regrow destroyed crops.

Delia platura prefers regions with mild climates, as it thrives best in those temperatures. Delia platura was first discovered in Germany and is currently found in many agricultural regions worldwide, such as North America, the United States, and Canada. Due to its widespread distribution and ability to infest and damage crops, Delia platura causes negative ecological and agricultural impacts worldwide.

== Host plants ==
Found globally, the insect utilizes many host plants. Common host plants of Delia platura include both vegetables and fruits. Known vegetable host plants include members of the Brassicaceae family, comprising Brussels sprout, cabbage, cauliflower, kale, mustard, rutabaga, turnip, and sea kale; the Cucurbitaceae family, consisting of cantaloupe, cucumber, pumpkin, and squash; the Fabaceae family, containing alfalfa, lima bean, pea, and snap bean; the Solanaceae family, featuring potato, tobacco, and tomato; the Amaryllidaceae family, including onion and garlic; the Asteraceae family, comprising artichoke and lettuce; and the Amaranthaceae family containing beat and spinach. Additional host plants include carrot, corn, rhubarb, strawberry, cotton, and sweet potato, which belong to the Apiaceae, Poaceae, Polygonaceae, Rosaceae, Malvaceae, and Convolvulaceae families, respectively.

It has been debated whether or not Delia platura should be categorized as a primary pest, an organism that damages healthy plants, or a secondary pest, an organism that damages already harmed plants. However, previous research classifies it as a saprophagous pest, meaning it feeds on previously harmed plants and therefore best fits under the secondary pest category.

== Host plant resistance ==
Different host plants have various responses to being attacked by Delia platura larvae. For instance, corn is the most resistant to harm, beans such as lima or snap beans are moderately impacted, while cantaloupe and watermelon are the most susceptible to damage. There are certain features of host plants that lead to lower risk in being harmed by the larvae. For example, beans containing a darker outer layer are less at risk of being harmed when compared to beans with a white outer layer.

== Natural enemies ==
Global distribution often leads to a wide variety of natural enemies, which is the case for the Delia platura. It is associated with a large range of natural enemies such as parasitoids, arthropod predators, and fungi. Parasitoids, organisms that develop inside their host and eventually kill it, found in Delia platura include Aleochara bilineata (Coleoptera: Staphylinidae), Aphaereta pallipes (Hymenoptera: Braconidae), Trybliographa rapae (Hymenoptera: Figitidae), and Aleochara bimaculata (Coleoptera: Staphylinidae). Arthropod predators of this species include ants and spiders. Lastly, the fungus Entomophthora muscae (Entomophthorales: Entomophthoraceae) infects Delia platura and causes disease.

Due to their known ability to negatively impact agriculture, ecosystems, and economic systems, chemicals are used to minimize Delia platura populations. Chemicals that are used include, but not limited to, chlorpyrifos, clothianidin, imidacloprid, and spinosad. These chemicals have been used on seeds or part of planting methods in order to protect onion seedlings from Delia platura larvae damage. However, this can lead to detrimental effects on human health as well as the environment because it can cause air and soil pollution, which in turn has the ability to kill valuable organisms. Therefore, a more natural solution is recommended when reducing their population from farms.

Researchers identified biological pest control as a natural solution for decreasing Delia platura populations. The three most common parasitoids found in agricultural fields within Mexico were Aphaereta pallipes, Trybliographa rapae, and Aleochara bimaculata, with Aphaereta pallipes being observed the most. This has encouraged farmers to introduce parasitoids into Delia platura environments, as a crop conserving mechanism, instead of chemicals to prevent damage to crops.

In addition to using biological pest control, entomopathogenic nematodes, like Steinernema, can also limit Delia platura communities in farms, as these nematodes use carbon dioxide to detect moving hosts and then make their way through the body of the insect, where they release toxins that kill it.

Using these natural enemies offers a sustainable solution for reducing agricultural pests, allowing for an increase in plant biodiversity and a reduction in excess economic costs. Furthermore, this method prevents farmers from needing to use chemicals that can damage human health and the environment.

== Oviposition ==
Previously, oviposition was thought to be a straightforward process in which Delia platura simply laid its eggs on common host plants. However, it is now known that oviposition is a much more complex mechanism, and there are many factors that influence their egg-laying behavior. It is essential for female Delia platura to oviposit in the right places as their larval offspring will not be able to move far afterwards.

Female Delia platura use their volatile cues to determine where to lay their eggs. They detect chemicals, such as 1-octen-3-ol and 3-octatone which trigger oviposition. These chemicals are oftentimes associated with bacteria found on or near host plants, suggesting that bacteria plays a major role in oviposition, and that females prefer surfaces with bacteria over clean ones. Specifically, the three bacterial species that strongly promote oviposition were identified as Flavobacterium species, Erwinia herbicola, and Xanthomonas campestris. One reason why egg laying near bacteria is preferred is because it is commonly linked with food, meaning the mothers prefer to lay eggs where food can later be used by their offspring.

Furthermore, Delia platura does not need to directly interact with bacteria, so long as it can smell them, it can still be influenced to lay eggs nearby. Even when growth-inhibiting bacteria are present and decrease the volume of bacteria, Delia platura can still detect them and continue laying eggs there, demonstrating that bacterial odors play an important role in oviposition behavior.

== Life cycle and development ==
Delia platura can typically complete an entire life cycle, progressing through the egg, larval, pupal, and adult stage, in around 15–77 days. However, this timeline is heavily affected by temperature. Warm temperatures of around 25–30°C lead to faster developmental times, while colder temperature ranges of 10–15°C slow development down. During warm temperatures, the insect could complete its life cycle within 17 days, while it took 240 days in colder temperatures.

Each year, there are 2 to 4 generations of Delia platura produced, but this number is influenced by temperature. During intense weather conditions, such as high heat in the summer or extremely cold temperatures in the winter, Delia platura enters a dormant state in order to save energy and survive unfavorable conditions. Entering these states leads to lower reproduction rates and thus fewer generations.

Due to different regions having different temperatures and climates, different numbers of generations may arise per location. In the United States, specifically New York and Wisconsin, as well as in England and Ontario, there are around 4 new generations annually. The generations are easily distinguishable due to their flight times. New generations are identified in May, June, July, and August, However, other regions, like South Carolina, make it harder for generations to be differentiated from one another. Delia platura in South Carolina are active year-round due to favorable weather conditions that allow them to stay continuously active. Because of this, generations can blend together, making it hard to differentiate the separate generations. This leads to South Carolina experiencing the emergence of 3 new generations annually; however, this number may not be accurately represented. Meanwhile, in Iowa, around 2 generations are produced each year due to extreme seasonal weather that stops development.

=== Egg ===
Delia platura females typically lay their eggs in temperatures between 10–27°C near decaying seedlings and fresh soil. The eggs are white, long, and oval-shaped. The eggs are extremely small, typically with a length of 0.95 mm and a width of 0.3 mm. How long the insect stays in its egg stage is dependent on temperature. Colder temperatures cause them to remain in their egg stage longer than in hot temperatures. At temperatures of 7°C, 15°C, and 28°C, they hatch within 9, 3, and 1 day(s), respectively.

=== Larva ===
The larval stage comes immediately after egg hatching, and this stage is when Delia platura does the most damage by eating seeds and seedlings. The larval stage consists of 3 phases, otherwise known as instars. From the first to third instar, they grow from 0.7 mm to 7 mm. During this stage, the larvae eat in groups. The larva's optimal temperature for development is 21–23°C, and they can mature into pupae in 7–12 days, while development takes 20–30 days when the temperature is 10°C. They can also develop at lower temperatures of 4–7°C, but at an even slower rate. Due to the fact that Delia platura larvae are small and extremely similar to onion maggots, researchers use anterior spiracles, structures that support larval breathing, to differentiate between them, and aiding in their identification are the 5 to 8 lobes that they possess.

Immediately after egg hatching, the insects enter their first larval instar and, therefore, are extremely sensitive to food quality and thus only eat decaying materials. As the insect progresses through each instar, the mouth structure increases in size from 0.33 mm in the first instar to 0.65 mm in the second instar and finally to 0.89 mm in the third instar. Furthermore, the time taken to progress from the first to second instar is 1–3 days, from the second to third instar is 3–5 days, and from the third instar to the pupal stage is 5–16 days, all within a temperature range of 14–17°C.

=== Pupa ===
The pupal stage emerges after the third instar of the larval stage and typically lasts 7-14 days at temperatures of 18–24°C. During this stage, Delia platura measures around 5 mm long and 1.5 mm wide. Like many flies, Delia platura is encapsulated in a protective shell referred to as an oval puparium. The color of this protective layer is light red to brown and becomes darker as development progresses within this stage.

=== Adult ===
After the pupal stage, Delia platura enters its adult stage. Adults are around 5 mm long, similar in size to the oval puparium during the pupal stage. Both males and females are a gray to brown color with long, black legs, and transparent wings that help them avoid predators.

Stripes are used to distinguish between male and female Delia platura. Males are seen to have stripes running down their chest and abdomen while females do not have this feature. Female Delia platura typically mature and mate within 7–14 days after entering the adult phase and can each lay around 100 eggs. The lifespan of the Delia platura is influenced by temperature but is generally around 30–40 days after mating. They prefer mild to cool temperatures and survive longer under these conditions but die at extreme temperatures around 35°C.

== Damage ==
The larval stage is typically the stage in which Delia platura causes the most damage, especially under favorable temperature conditions. Because the larvae are unable to eat fully grown produce, their primary food source is young seeds, meaning they destroy plants that have not yet grown out of the soil. The larvae tend to find seeds that are slightly split open and dig into them, leading to the rotting of the seeds. Depending on how many larvae attack the seed, the plant can either fully recover or be permanently destroyed. During the adult stage, Delia platura prefers to lay its eggs on freshly planted seeds rather than seedlings because their offspring can use the seeds as a food source, allowing them to develop better and thus increasing their chances of survival. Furthermore, there is a trend observed of Delia platura attacking already damaged plants. However, there has also been evidence that Delia platura is able to attack healthy plants, meaning that plant disease may attract them but is not required for infestation to occur. Delia platura not only damages plants by destroying their seeds, but also transfers disease between them by spreading Erwinia carotovora, a plant-rotting bacterium.

== Behavior ==
In order to maximize plant conservation, researchers study the behavior of Delia platura and what attracts them to certain plants so they can better manage populations and prevent major crop damage. Although chemicals and pesticides are often used, a more long-term conservation strategy may involve using the insect's natural attractions against it.

It was discovered that Delia platura can detect and is attracted to odors released by specific bacterial species associated with plants. However, this is only one factor that attracts Delia platura to plants. Other studies found that alcohol, bonemeal, enzymatic yeast hydrolysate, and gray sticky traps can also be used to lure and trap these flies. Additionally, Delia platura is attracted to corn seeds and decaying plant material like silage alfalfa. Knowing its preferences is important because they can be used to lure in and trap the agricultural pest before they damage the crops beyond repair.

== Phenology ==
Similar to many species, adult Delia platura appearance in fields is heavily connected to seasonal temperature patterns. Older studies observed Delia platura populations in crop fields at 471 degree days, meaning a large heat accumulation was necessary in order to find Delia platura in the fields. However, recent studies showed that they started to be recorded in fields in 282 degree days in 2022 and in as little as 67 degree days in 2023, meaning only a small heat accumulation is needed to find Delia platura in corn fields. This suggests that adult Delia platura appear earlier in the year with less heat accumulation than previous research had shown, such that farmers are expected to have to fight against the agricultural pest earlier in the annual cycle.

== Genetics ==
As mentioned, a major component of oviposition is chemical signals released from bacteria. The ability to detect such signals through the sense of smell is due to the odorant-binding proteins found within the antennae and the legs of Delia platura. Such proteins bind to odor molecules in the environment, allowing them to detect egg-laying signals. Delia platura have at least 20 known genes encoding odorant-binding proteins that are also found in similar species, indicating that evolution has conserved these genes and suggesting that they are important for survival and overall fitness.

== Cultural practices ==
Common cultural practices taking place in agricultural farms today to improve plant growth also improve Delia platura larval survival. This imposes a big problem for farmers, as what is improving their crops is also leading to their destruction. Continuous watering of plants is essential for crop survival but also helps the larvae thrive. Furthermore, factors like using tilled soil and manure promote plant growth, but the bacteria found in the manure can also increase the likelihood of oviposition occurring in that area. In turn, this causes larval populations to increase near those plants and destroy them. However, there are methods that farmers have been implementing to combat this issue. There has been an observed decrease in Delia platura populations during the summertime, which farmers have used to their advantage and started to increase plant growing during this time. Additionally, during the summer, plants tend to grow faster and give larvae less time to destroy the seeds. Moreover, farmers have begun to hold off seed planting until Delia platura populations have grown out of the larval stage, as this is when they do the most damage.

== See also ==
- Agriculture in the United Kingdom
