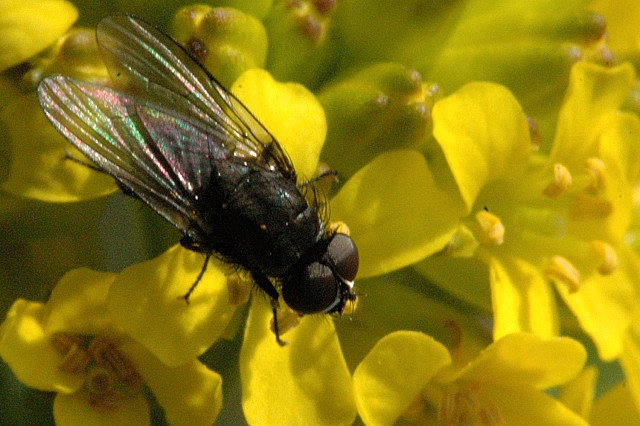
- Phorbia fumigata

Scientific classification
- Kingdom: Animalia
- Phylum: Arthropoda
- Class: Insecta
- Order: Diptera
- Family: Anthomyiidae
- Genus: Phorbia; Robineau-Desvoidy, 1830

= Phorbia =

Genus of flies

Phorbia is a genus of flies belonging to the family Anthomyiidae.

The species of this genus are found in Europe and Northern America.

== Selected species ==
- Phorbia acklandi Hennig, 1969
- Phorbia acrophallosa Ackland, 1993
