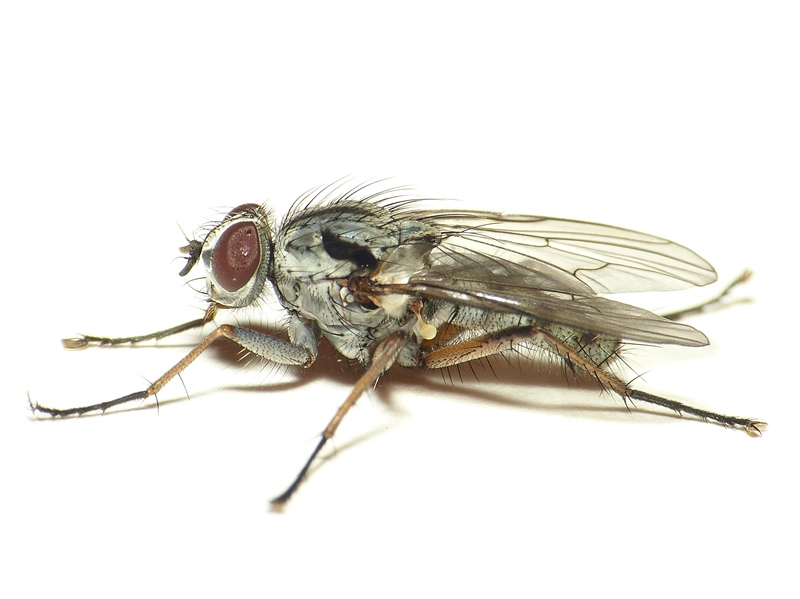
- Eustalomyia vittipes

Scientific classification
- Domain: Eukaryota
- Kingdom: Animalia
- Phylum: Arthropoda
- Class: Insecta
- Order: Diptera
- Family: Anthomyiidae
- Genus: Eustalomyia; Kowarz, 1873

= Eustalomyia =

Genus of flies

Eustalomyia is a genus of root-maggot flies in the family Anthomyiidae. There are about five described species in Eustalomyia. They are kleptoparasites that consume paralyzed prey meant for Crabronidae larvae.

== Species ==
These five species belong to the genus Eustalomyia:

- E. festiva (Zetterstedt, 1845)^{i c g}
- E. hilaris (Fallén, 1823)^{c g}
- E. histrio (Zetterstedt, 1838)^{i c g}
- E. lepraota Séguy, 1928^{c g}
- E. vittipes (Zetterstedt, 1845)^{i c g}

Data sources: i = ITIS, c = Catalogue of Life, g = GBIF, b = Bugguide.net
