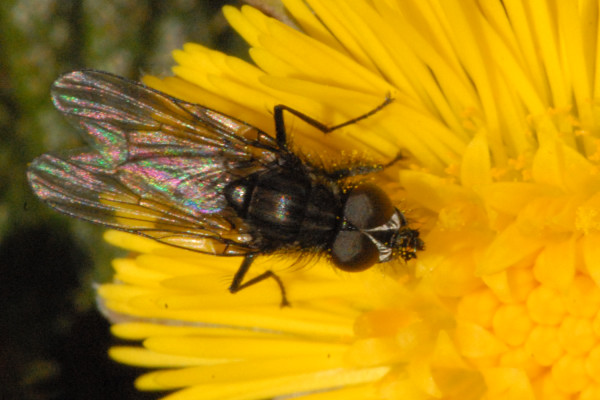
- Egle ciliata

Scientific classification
- Domain: Eukaryota
- Kingdom: Animalia
- Phylum: Arthropoda
- Class: Insecta
- Order: Diptera
- Family: Anthomyiidae
- Subfamily: Anthomyiinae
- Tribe: Anthomyini
- Genus: Egle; Robineau-Desvoidy, 1830

= Egle (fly) =

Genus of flies

Egle is a genus of willow catkin flies in the family Anthomyiidae. There are at least 40 described species in Egle.

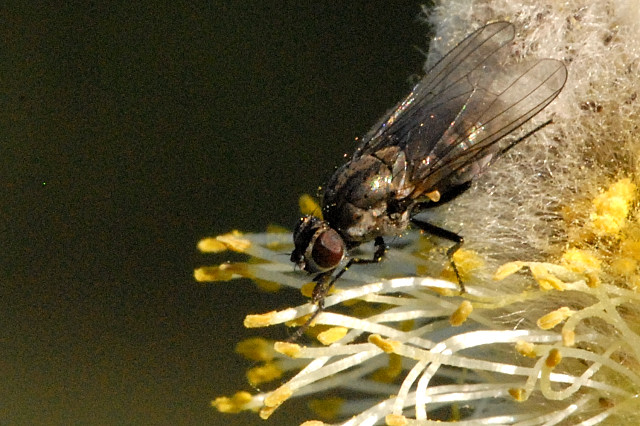
Egle ciliata

== Species ==
These 48 species belong to the genus Egle:

- E. acicularis Griffiths, 2003^{c g}
- E. agilis (Robineau-Desvoidy, 1830)^{c}
- E. anderssoni Michelsen, 2009^{g}
- E. arctophila Griffiths, 2003^{c g}
- E. asiatica Hennig, 1976^{c g}
- E. atomaria (Zetterstedt, 1845)^{i c g}
- E. bicaudata (Malloch, 1920)^{i c g}
- E. brevicornis (Zetterstedt, 1838)^{i c g}
- E. ciliata (Walker, 1849)^{i c g}
- E. claripennis (Robineau-Desvoidy, 1830)^{c}
- E. communis (Robineau-Desvoidy, 1830)^{c g}
- E. concomitans (Pandellé, 1900)^{i c g}
- E. cyrtacra Fan & Wang, 1982^{c g}
- E. exigua (Robineau-Desvoidy, 1830)^{c g}
- E. falcata Ackland & Griffiths, 2003^{c g}
- E. festiva (Robineau-Desvoidy, 1830)^{c g}
- E. flavescens (Robineau-Desvoidy, 1830)^{c g}
- E. floricola (Robineau-Desvoidy, 1830)^{c}
- E. florum (Robineau-Desvoidy, 1830)^{c g}
- E. gracilior Zheng & Fan, 1990^{c g}
- E. ignobilis Michelsen, 2009^{g}
- E. inermis Ackland, 1970^{c g}
- E. inermoides Michelsen, 2009^{g}
- E. korpokkur Suwa, 1974^{c g}
- E. longipalpis (Malloch, 1924)^{i c g}
- E. lyneborgi Ackland & Griffiths, 2003^{c g}
- E. minuta (Meigen, 1826)^{i c g}
- E. myricariae Grossmann, 1998^{c g}
- E. nigra (Robineau-Desvoidy, 1830)^{g}
- E. nitida (Robineau-Desvoidy, 1830)^{c g}
- E. pallipes (Robineau-Desvoidy, 1830)^{c g}
- E. parva Robineau-Desvoidy, 1830^{c g}
- E. parvaeformis Schnabl, 1911^{i c g}
- E. pilitibia (Ringdahl, 1918)^{i c g}
- E. podulparia Suh & Kwon, 1985^{c g}
- E. polychaeta Griffiths, 2003^{c g}
- E. protuberans Griffiths, 2003^{c g}
- E. pseudosteini Griffiths, 2003^{c g}
- E. pulverulentus (Robineau-Desvoidy, 1830)^{c g}
- E. rectapica Ge & Fan, 1981^{c g}
- E. rhinotmeta (Pandellé, 1900)^{c g}
- E. setiapicis (Huckett, 1965)^{i c g}
- E. steini Schnabl, 1911^{i c g}
- E. subarctica (Huckett, 1965)^{i c g}
- E. suwai Michelsen, 2009^{g}
- E. tantilla Ackland, 1970^{c g}
- E. viridescens (Robineau-Desvoidy, 1830)^{c g}
- E. washburni Griffiths, 2003^{c g}

Data sources: i = ITIS, c = Catalogue of Life, g = GBIF, b = Bugguide.net
