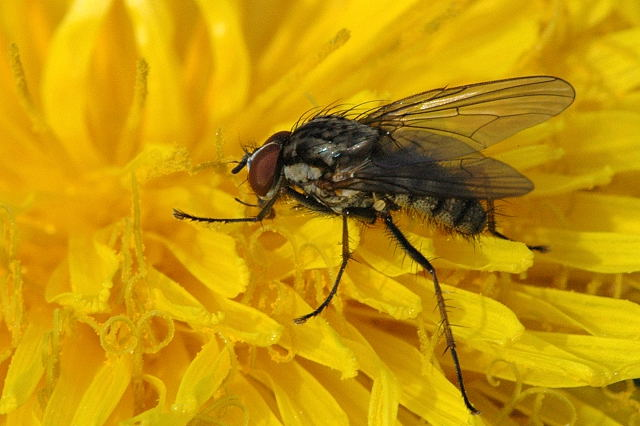

Scientific classification
- Kingdom: Animalia
- Phylum: Arthropoda
- Clade: Pancrustacea
- Class: Insecta
- Order: Diptera
- Family: Anthomyiidae
- Genus: Delia
- Species: D. radicum

Binomial name
- Delia radicum (Linnaeus, 1758)

Synonyms
- Musca radicum Linnaeus, 1758; Anthomyia brassicae Wiedemann, 1817; Chortophila floccosa Macquart, 1835; Chortophila frontalis Macquart, 1835; Aricia villipes Zetterstedt, 1845; Chortophila appendiculata Bigot, 1885; Anthomyia detergens Pandellé, 1900; Anthomyia stimulea Pandellé, 1900

= Delia radicum =

Species of fly

Delia radicum, known variously as the cabbage fly, cabbage root fly, root fly or turnip fly, is a pest of crops. The larvae of the cabbage root fly are sometimes known as the cabbage maggot or root maggot. Delia brassicae (or Hylemya brassicae) was the most common name in literature prior to 1981. The adult flies are about 1 cm long and are grey in colour, but otherwise resemble the common house fly.

The flies can be found all over Europe. After overwintering as pupae in the soil, the flies emerge in spring, feed on nectar, and lay eggs close to plants of the genus Brassica. The eggs are white and about 1 mm in diameter. They hatch into white maggots after about six days and the larvae feed for about three weeks on the roots and stems of the cabbage plants. After this, the larvae are typically 0.9 to 1 cm in length and form reddish-brown pupae which hatch into adult flies after around 20 days. This species is univoltine (has one generation per year) in northern Europe and bi- or trivoltine in central Europe.

== Economic significance ==
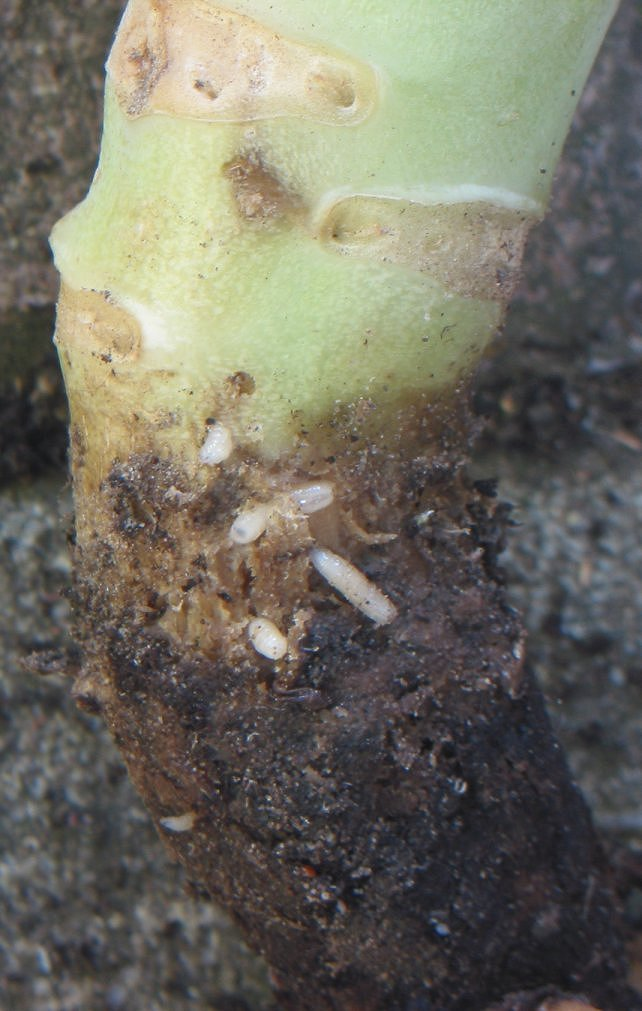
Fly larvae

The first sign of the presence of the larvae is a delay in plant growth accompanied by the withering of leaves which develop a bluish tinge. The larvae are found on cabbage, turnip, swede, radish, and other cruciferous crops. Sometimes, 300 larvae can be found on one plant, damaging the inner parts of the main root and disrupting the transport of water and nutrients to the stem and leaves causing the death of many plants.
