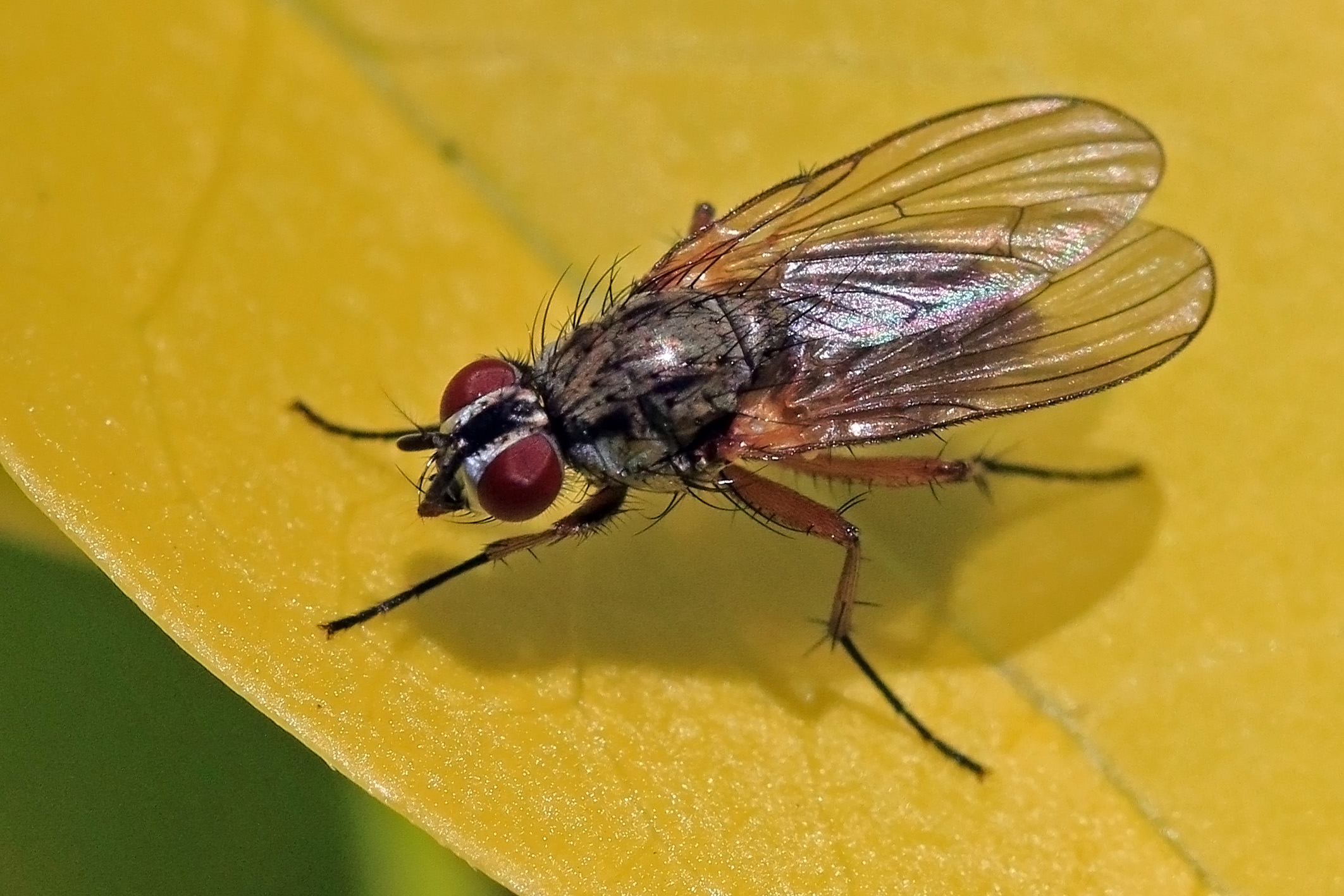
- Root-maggot fly Hydrophoria linogrisea

Scientific classification
- Kingdom: Animalia
- Phylum: Arthropoda
- Clade: Pancrustacea
- Class: Insecta
- Order: Diptera
- Clade: Eremoneura
- (unranked): Cyclorrhapha
- Section: Schizophora
- Subsection: Calyptratae
- Superfamily: Muscoidea
- Family: Anthomyiidae; Robineau-Desvoidy, 1830

Subfamilies
- Anthomyiinae; Pegomyinae

= Anthomyiidae =

Family of flies

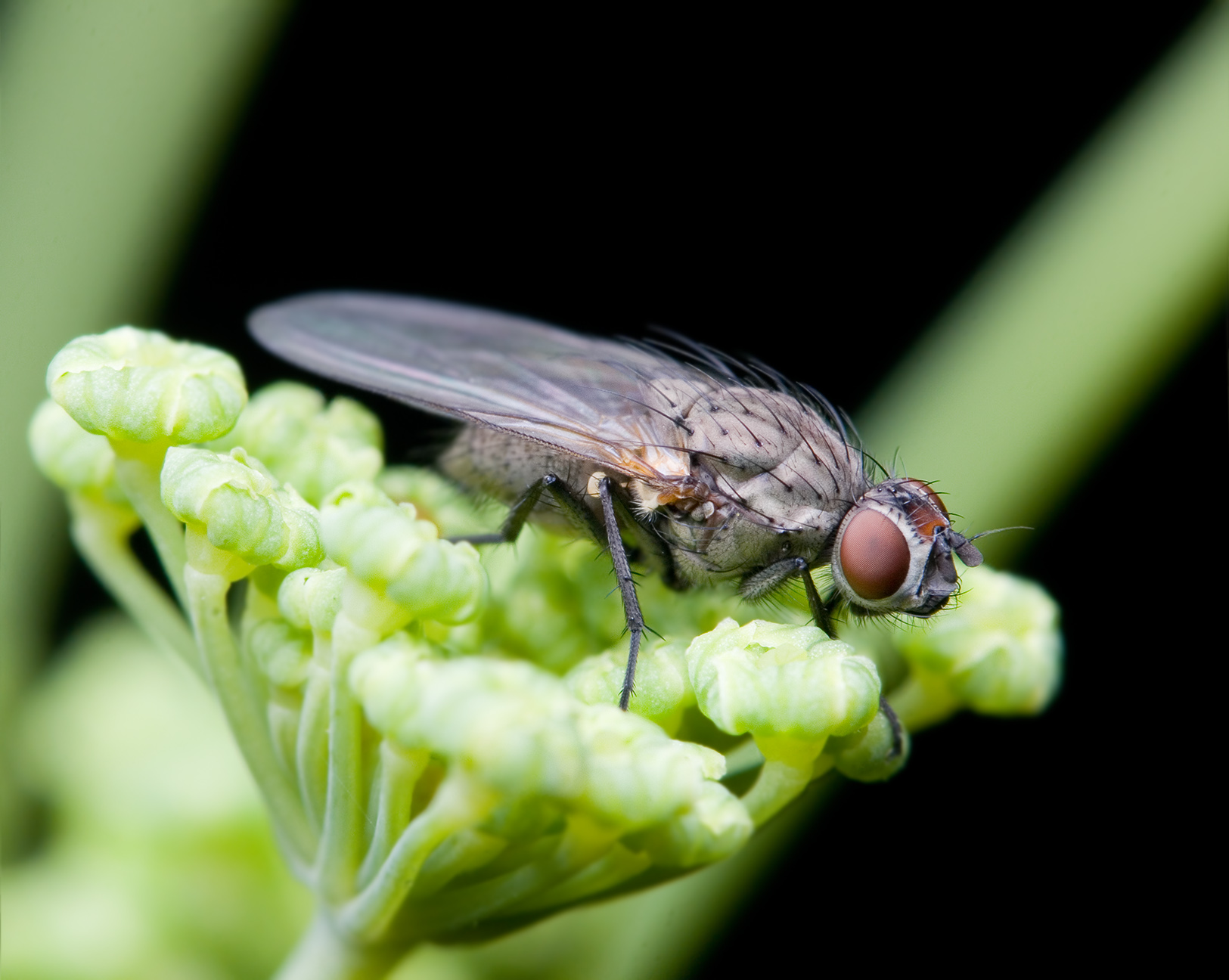
Adia cinerella

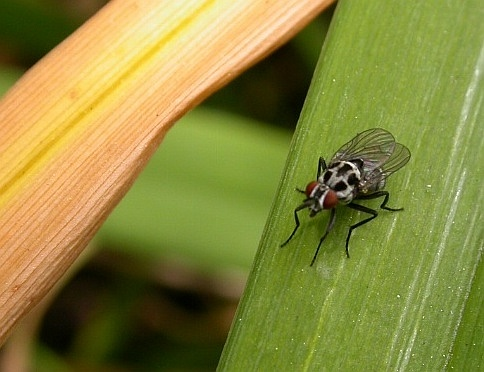
Anthomyia pluvialis

The Anthomyiidae are a large and diverse family of Muscoidea flies. Most look rather like small houseflies. Most species are drab grey to black. Many Pegomya are yellow, and some members of the genera Anthomyia and Eutrichota are patterned in black-and-white or black-and-silvery-grey. Most are difficult to identify, apart from a few groups such as the kelp flies that are conspicuous on beaches.

The name Anthomyiidae was derived from Greek anthos (flower) plus myia (a fly).

Some species are commonly called "root-maggots", as the larvae are found in the stems and roots of various plants. As larvae, some also feed on decaying plant material. The well-known grey "seaweed flies" or "kelp flies" (Fucellia) are examples. Others are scavengers in such places as birds' nests; yet other species are leaf miners; the family also includes inquilines, commensals, and parasitic larvae.

Some species in the family are significant agricultural pests, particularly some from the genus Delia, which includes the onion fly (D. antiqua), the wheat bulb fly (D. coarctata), the turnip root fly (D. floralis), the seedcorn maggot (D. platura), and the cabbage root fly (D. radicum).

In some contexts, like mountain environments, the adults can be common flower visitors, also being involved in pollination.

== Description ==
These flies are small or moderate in size. Hypopleural bristles found on the sides of the thorax are apical. The anal vein of the wing reaches the margin of the wings (except in Chelisia). The median vein is straight, not curved towards the anterior alar margin. Three pairs of postsutural dorsocentral bristles almost always are present. The first segment of the posterior tarsi are on the lower side near the base with minute bristles. The sternopleuron lower side often has short, soft hairs. Eyes in the male in most cases are close-set or contiguous. Females of many species are not known as of yet.

== Classification ==
- Family Anthomyiidae -- anthomyiid flies

- Subfamily Anthomyiinae

- Tribe Anthomyiini

Hylemya nigrimana

- Genus Anthomyia Meigen, 1803
- Genus Botanophila Lioy, 1864
- Genus Chiastocheta Pokorny, 1889
- Genus Fucellia Robineau-Desvoidy, 1842
- Genus Hylemya Robineau-Desvoidy, 1830
- Genus Hylemyza Schnabl & Dziedzicki, 1911

- Tribe Chirosiini

- Genus Chirosia Rondani, 1856
- Genus Egle Robineau-Desvoidy, 1830
- Genus Lasiomma Stein, 1916
- Genus Strobilomyia Michelsen, 1988

- Tribe Hydrophoriini

- Genus Acridomyia Stackelberg, 1929
- Genus Adia Robineau-Desvoidy, 1830
- Genus Boreophorbia Michelsen, 1987
- Genus Coenosopsia Malloch, 1924
- Genus Delia Robineau-Desvoidy, 1830
- Genus Eustalomyia Kowarz, 1873
- Genus Heterostylodes Hennig, 1967
- Genus Hydrophoria Robineau-Desvoidy, 1830
- Genus Leucophora Robineau-Desvoidy, 1830
- Genus Paregle Schnabl, 1911
- Genus Phorbia Robineau-Desvoidy, 1830
- Genus Subhylemyia Ringdahl, 1933
- Genus Zaphne Robineau-Desvoidy, 1830

- Subfamily Pegomyinae

- Tribe Pegomyini

- Genus Alliopsis Schnabl & Dziedzicki, 1911
- Genus Emmesomyia Malloch, 1917
- Genus Eutrichota Kowarz, 1893
- Genus Mycophaga Rondani, 1856
- Genus Paradelia Ringdahl, 1933
- Genus Parapegomyia Griffiths, 1984
- Genus Pegomya Robineau-Desvoidy, 1830

- Tribe Myopinini

- Genus Pegoplata Schnabl & Dziedzicki, 1911
- Genus Calythea Schnabl in Schnabl & Dziedzicki, 1911
- Genus Myopina Robineau-Desvoidy, 1830

== See also ==
- Pest Information Wiki
