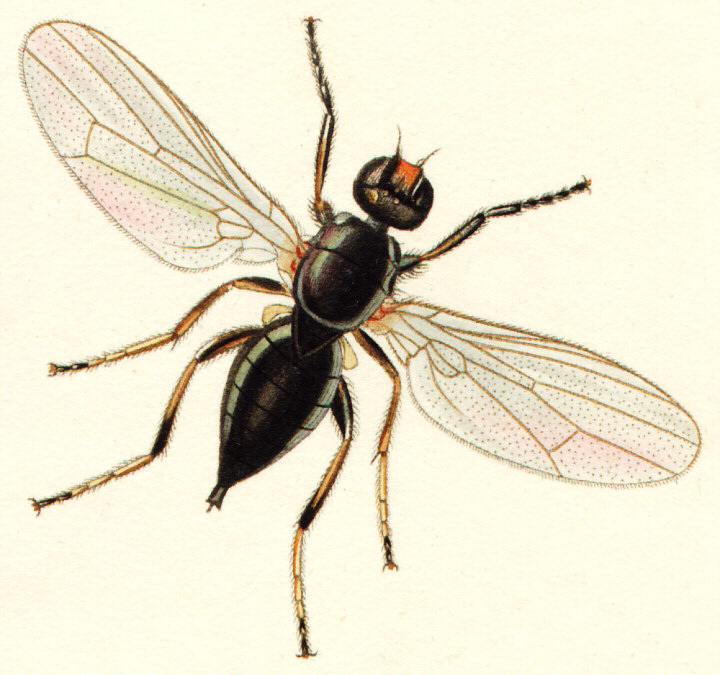
- Piophila casei

Scientific classification
- Domain: Eukaryota
- Kingdom: Animalia
- Phylum: Arthropoda
- Class: Insecta
- Order: Diptera
- Family: Piophilidae
- Subfamily: Piophilinae
- Tribe: Piophilini

= Piophilini =

Cheese flies

Tribe of flies

Piophilini is a tribe of small two-winged flies which includes the species known as the cheese fly.

== Genera ==
- Allopiophila Hendel, 1917
- Mycetaulus Loew, 1845
- Piophila Fallén, 1810
- Prochyliza Walker, 1849
- Protopiophila Duda, 1924
- Pseudoseps Becker, 1902
- Stearibia Lioy, 1864
