= 1968 in science =

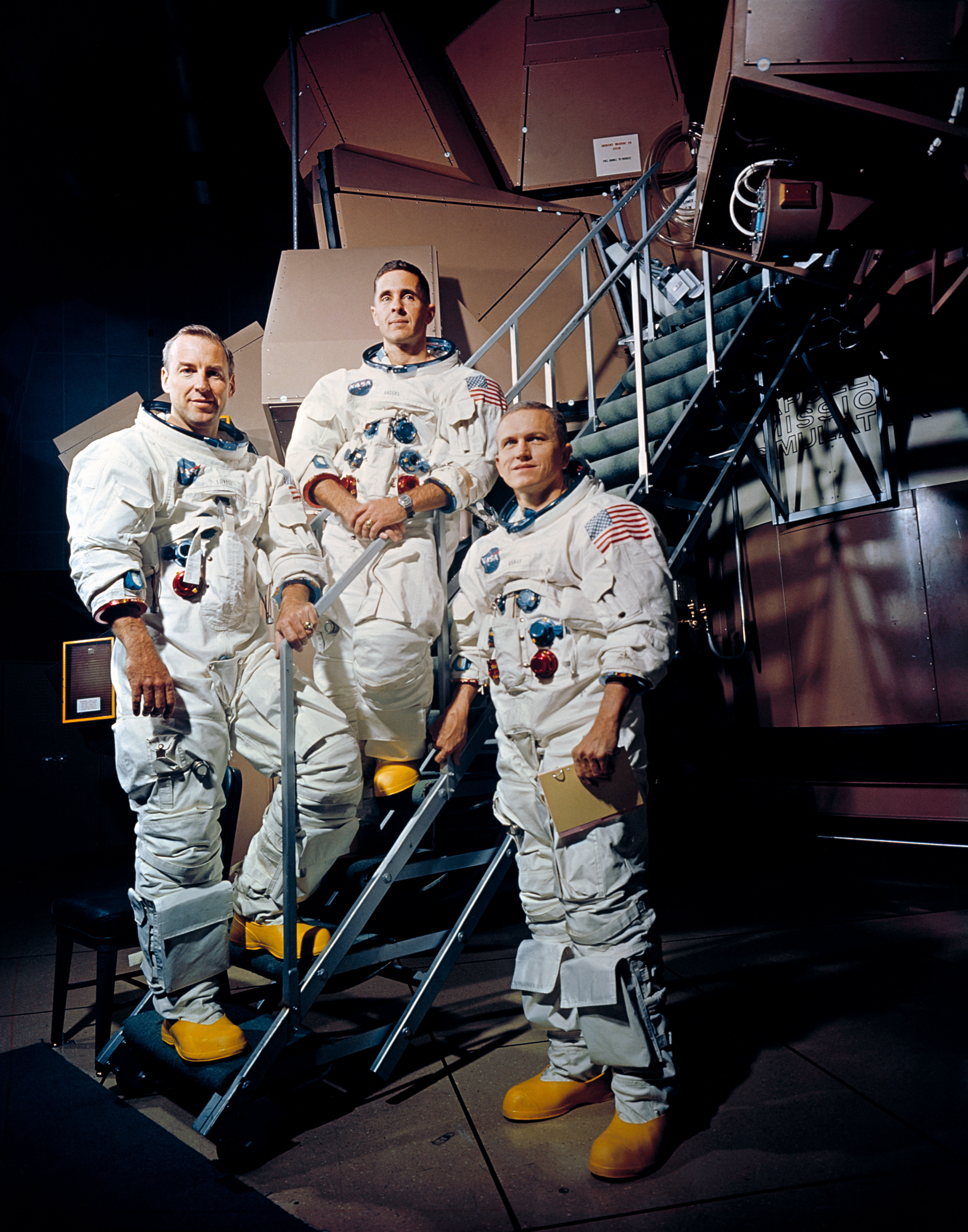

The year 1968 in science and technology involved some significant events, listed below.

== Astronomy ==
- Thomas Gold explains the recently discovered radio pulsars as rapidly rotating neutron stars; subsequent observations confirm the suggestion.

== Computer science ==
- April – First book printed completely using electronic composition, the United States edition of Andrew Garve's thriller The Long Short Cut.
- July 18 – The semiconductor chip company Intel is founded by Gordon E. Moore and Robert Noyce in Mountain View, California.
- December 9 – In what becomes retrospectively known as "The Mother of All Demos", Douglas Engelbart of Stanford Research Institute's Augmentation Research Center demonstrates for the first time the computer mouse, the video conference, teleconferencing, hypertext, word processing, hypermedia, object addressing, the dynamic linker and a collaborative real-time editor using NLS.

== Mathematics ==
- Beniamino Segre describes a version of the tennis ball theorem.

== Medicine ==
- January 2 – Dr. Christiaan Barnard performs the second successful human heart transplant, in South Africa, on Philip Blaiberg, who survives for nineteen months.
- May 25 – A human heart transplant performed at the Medical College of Virginia leads to a 4-year legal case, Tucker v. Lower, over the definition of brain death.
- November – Outbreak of acute gastroenteritis among schoolchildren in Norwalk, Ohio, caused by "Norwalk agent", the first identified norovirus.
- Publication of a Harvard committee report on irreversible coma establishes a paradigm for defining brain death. France becomes the first European country to adopt brain death as a legal definition (or indicator) of death.
- Doctors perform the first successful bone marrow transplant, to treat severe combined immunodeficiency (SCID).
- DiGeorge syndrome is first described by pediatric endocrinologist Angelo DiGeorge.

== Physics ==
- Georges Charpak develops the multiwire proportional chamber for particle detection at CERN.

== Psychology ==
- John Darley and Bibb Latané demonstrate the bystander effect.
- Walter Mischel publishes Personality and Assessment.

== Robotics ==
- January – Miomir Vukobratović proposes Zero Moment Point, a theoretical model to explain biped locomotion.

== Space exploration ==
- September 15–22 – Zond program: Soviet spacecraft Zond 5 becomes the first vehicle to circle the Moon (September 18) and return to splashdown on Earth. It also carries the first living organisms to circle the Moon, including two Russian tortoises, Piophila, mealworms, plants and bacteria.
- October 11 – Apollo program: NASA launches Apollo 7, the first crewed Apollo mission, with astronauts Wally Schirra, Donn Fulton Eisele and R. Walter Cunningham aboard. Goals for the mission include the first live television broadcast from orbit and testing the lunar module docking maneuver.
- December 24 – Apollo 8 enters Moon orbit. Frank Borman, Jim Lovell and William A. Anders are the first humans to see the far side of the Moon and planet Earth as a whole. Anders photographs Earthrise.

== Technology ==
- May 23 – For the first time, an enemy aircraft is successfully shot down by a ship-launched surface-to-air missile, a RIM-8 Talos missile fired from U.S. Navy guided-missile cruiser USS Long Beach (CGN-9) 65 nautical miles (almost 75 miles or 120 kilometers) from its target (Vietnam War), the outcome of Operation Bumblebee begun during World War II.
- June 6 – Roy Jacuzzi is granted a patent for the Jacuzzi whirlpool hot tub in the United States.

== Events ==
- April 4 – United States theatrical release of Stanley Kubrick's film 2001: A Space Odyssey, based on a story by Arthur C. Clarke.

== Publications ==
- James D. Watson – The Double Helix: A Personal Account of the Discovery of the Structure of DNA.

== Awards ==
- Nobel Prizes
  - Physics – Luis Alvarez
  - Chemistry – Lars Onsager
  - Medicine – Robert W. Holley, Har Gobind Khorana, Marshall W. Nirenberg
- Turing Award – Richard Hamming

== Births ==
- January 11 – Benjamin List, German organic chemist, recipient of 2021 Nobel Prize in Chemistry
- March 3 – Brian Cox, English physicist and science communicator, previously rock keyboardist
- March 9 – Maggie Aderin-Pocock, English space scientist and science educator
- March 16 – David MacMillan, Scottish-born organic chemist, recipient of the 2021 Nobel Prize in Chemistry
- June 30 – Samantha Tross, Guyanese-born British orthopedic surgeon
- September 30 – Bennet Omalu, Nigerian physician, forensic pathologist and neuropathologist
- December 11 – Emmanuelle Charpentier, French biochemist, recipient of 2020 Nobel Prize in Chemistry

== Deaths ==
- January 6 – Xu Shunshou (born 1917), Chinese aeronautical engineer.
- February 1 – Jacob van der Hoeden (born 1891), Dutch-Israeli veterinary scientist
- February 21 – Howard Florey (born 1898), Australian pharmacologist, recipient of the Nobel Prize for Physiology or Medicine
- February 22 – May Smith (born 1879), English experimental psychologist.
- March 27 – Yuri Gagarin (born 1934), Russian cosmonaut, the first man in space.
- April 1 – Lev Davidovich Landau (born 1908), Russian physicist.
- June 21 – Constance Georgina Tardrew (born 1883), South African botanist.
- July 22 – Muthulakshmi Reddi (born 1886), Indian physician and social reformer.
- July 28 – Otto Hahn (born 1879), German chemist, recipient of 1944 Nobel Prize in Chemistry.
- October 27 – Lise Meitner (born 1878), German physicist, discoverer in 1939, with Otto Hahn, of nuclear fission.
- November 8 – Chika Kuroda (born 1884), Japanese chemist.
