= 1891 in science =

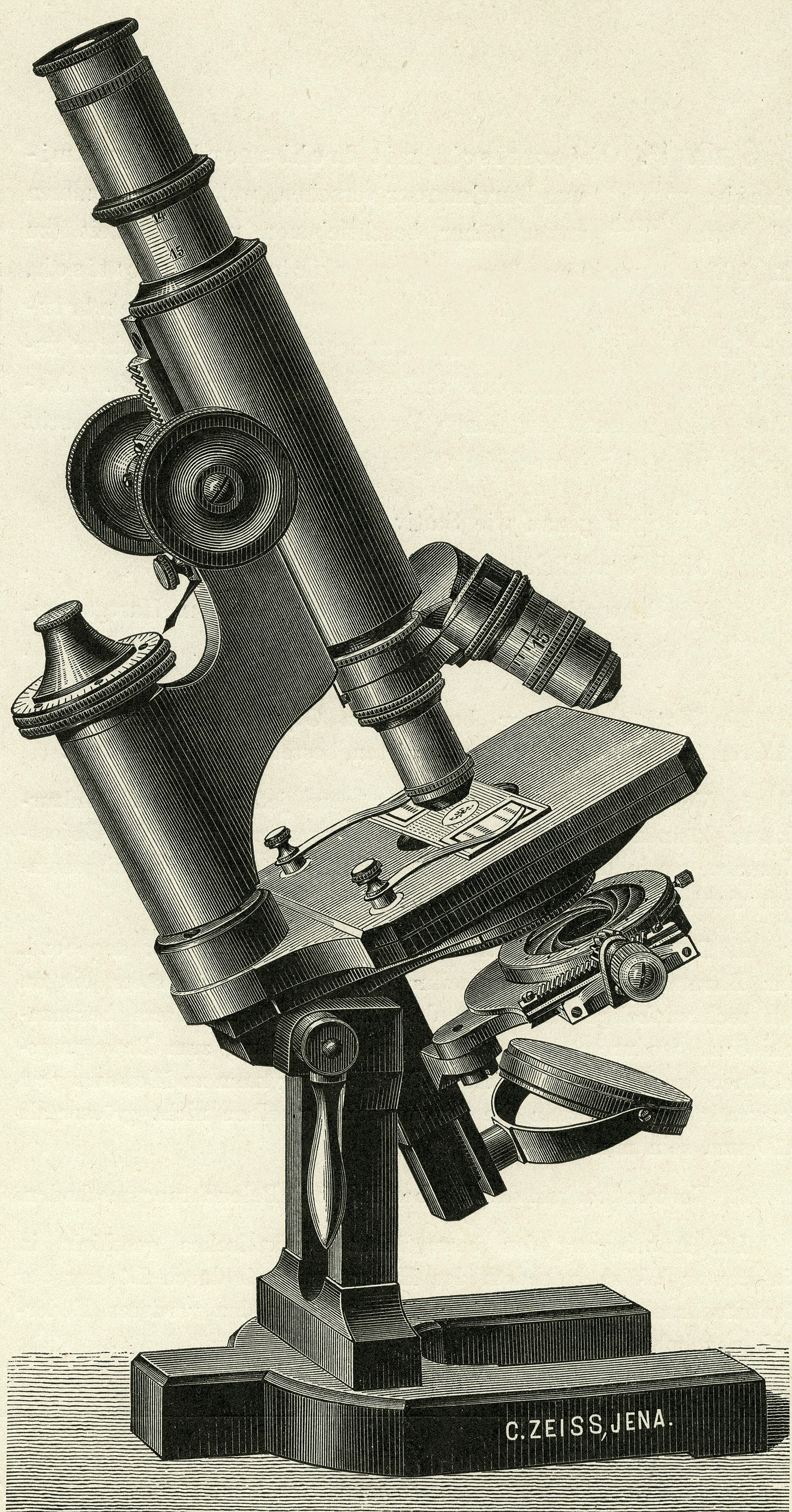
Early compound microscope "Stand I" from the Optical Workshop Carl Zeiss in Jena, in 1891

The year 1891 in science and technology involved some significant events, listed below.

== Biology ==
- March 3 – Yellowstone Timberland Reserve, predecessor of Shoshone National Forest, in Wyoming is established as the first United States National Forest.
- The New Zealand government sets aside Resolution Island in Fiordland as a nature reserve.
- The New York Botanical Garden is founded in The Bronx largely due to the efforts of Nathaniel Lord Britton.
- Jane Willis Kirkaldy and Catherine Pollard become the first women to sit final examinations in biology at the University of Oxford (and achieve first class honours).

== Chemistry ==
- Agnes Pockels first publishes the results of her researches into surface tension.
- The Fischer projection is devised by German chemist Hermann Emil Fischer,

== Geology ==
- Hans Reusch describes what comes to be known as Reusch's Moraine in northern Norway: tillite from a Precambrian glaciation.

== Environment ==
- The Japan Meteorological Agency begins taking records of the global average temperature.

== Mathematics ==
- Fyodorov–Schoenflies theorem concluded by Yevgraf Fyodorov and Arthur Schoenflies from their work on crystallographic groups.
- Édouard Lucas first formulates the ménage problem.

== Paleontology ==
- October – Eugène Dubois finds the first fragmentary bones of Pithecanthropus erectus (later redesignated Homo erectus), or 'Java Man', at Trinil on the Solo River.

== Physiology and medicine ==
- Julius Ludwig August Koch begins publication of Die psychopathischen Minderwertigkeiten in Ravensburg, introducing the concept of psychopathology.
- Arnold Pick first uses the term dementia praecox in this form.
- Heinrich Wilhelm Gottfried von Waldeyer-Hartz names the neuron.
- Myxedema is first treated successfully, by George Redmayne Murray using thyroid extract.
- The earliest recorded attempt at hip replacement is carried out by Themistocles Gluck in Berlin, using ivory to replace the femoral head.
- Viennese pathologist Hans Chiari describes a form of Chiari malformation.

== Technology ==
- March 10 – Almon B. Strowger, an undertaker in Topeka, Kansas, is granted a patent in the United States for an automatic telephone exchange using the Strowger switch.
- May 20 – First public demonstration of the Kinetograph moving picture system developed by W. K. L. Dickson under the direction of Thomas Alva Edison, a showing of the film known as Dickson Greeting. Edison files patents on the camera and peephole viewer on August 24.
- Crompton & Co. introduce the electric kettle, in the United Kingdom.
- Michelin patent the removable pneumatic bicycle tire.
- Panhard et Levassor produce the first Système Panhard automobile layout, consisting of four wheels with front-engine, rear-wheel drive and a sliding-gear transmission, designed by Émile Levassor.
- William Le Baron Jenney develops the construction of steel frame skyscrapers in Chicago with the Ludington, Manhattan and Second Leiter Buildings.
- The modern taximeter is invented by Friedrich Wilhelm Gustav Bruhn in Germany.

== Awards ==
- Copley Medal: Stanislao Cannizzaro
- Wollaston Medal for Geology: John Wesley Judd

== Births ==
- January 8 – Walther Bothe (died 1957), German physicist, winner of the Nobel Prize in Physics (1954).
- January 26 – Wilder Penfield (died 1976), American-born neurosurgeon.
- April 22 – Harold Jeffreys (died 1989), English mathematician.
- May 15 – Fritz Feigl (died 1971), Austrian-born Brazilian chemist
- July 5 – John Howard Northrop (suicide 1987), American biochemist, winner of the Nobel Prize in Chemistry (1946)
- July 27 – Jacob van der Hoeden, Dutch-Israeli veterinary scientist (died 1968)
- August 17 – Aly Tewfik Shousha (died 1964), Egyptian bacteriologist.
- September 14 – Ivan Matveyevich Vinogradov (died 1983), Russian mathematician.
- September 24 – W. F. Friedman (died 1969), Bessarabian-born cryptanalyst.
- October 24 – Ernest Melville DuPorte (died 1981), Caribbean-born Canadian insect morphologist.
- November 14 – Frederick Banting (died 1941), Canadian discoverer of insulin, winner of the Nobel Prize in Physiology or Medicine (1923).

== Deaths ==
- January 6 – Hugh Owen Thomas (born 1834), British orthopaedic surgeon.
- February 10 – Sofia Kovalevskaya (born 1850), Russian mathematician.
- March 9 – Amalie Dietrich (born 1821), German naturalist.
- May 11 – Edmond Becquerel (born 1820), French physicist.
- June 9 – Henry Edwards (born 1827), English-born American entomologist and actor.
- June 23
  - Sir Norman Pogson (born 1829), English-born astronomer.
  - Wilhelm Eduard Weber (born 1804), German physicist.
- August 30 – Emanoil Bacaloglu (born 1830), Romanian polymath.
- September 18 – William Ferrel (born 1817), American meteorologist.
- October 3 – Édouard Lucas (born 1842), French mathematician.
- November 18 – Joseph Wolstenholme (born 1829), English mathematician.
- December 21 – William Cavendish, 7th Duke of Devonshire (born 1808), English landowner and promoter of science.
