= Prochyliza brevicornis =

Scientific classification
- Domain: Eukaryota
- Kingdom: Animalia
- Phylum: Arthropoda
- Class: Insecta
- Order: Diptera
- Family: Piophilidae
- Genus: Prochyliza
- Species: P. brevicornis

Binomial name
- Prochyliza brevicornis Melander, 1924

Species of insect

Prochyliza brevicornis is a species of cheese skippers, insects in the family Piophilidae.
