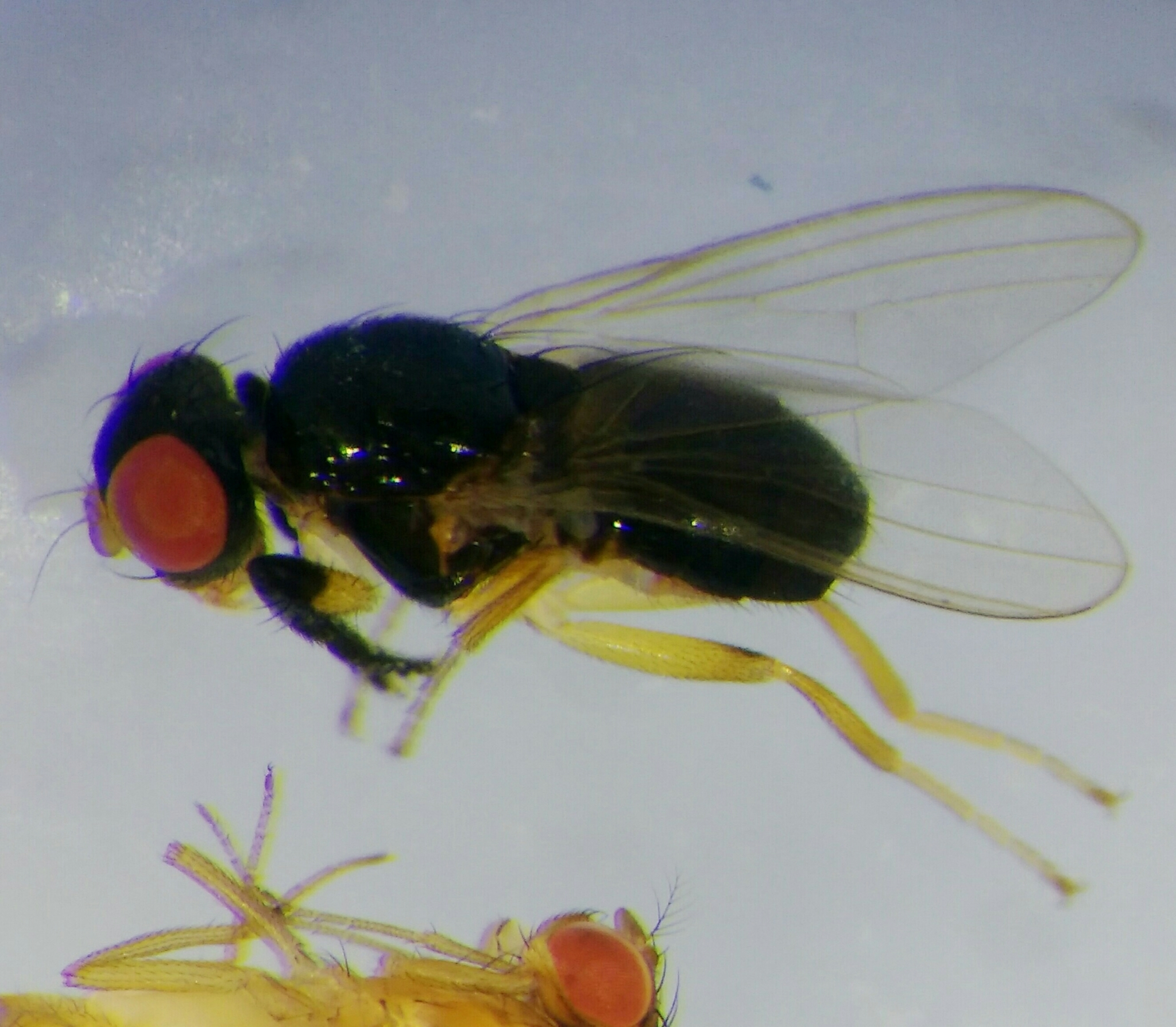

Scientific classification
- Domain: Eukaryota
- Kingdom: Animalia
- Phylum: Arthropoda
- Class: Insecta
- Order: Diptera
- Family: Piophilidae
- Genus: Protopiophila
- Species: P. latipes

Binomial name
- Protopiophila latipes (Meigen, 1838)

Synonyms
- Mycetaulus hornigi Cresson, 1919; Piophila latipes Meigen, 1838

= Protopiophila latipes =

Species of fly

Protopiophila latipes is a species of cheese skippers, insects in the family Piophilidae.
