= Prochyliza nigrimana =

Scientific classification
- Domain: Eukaryota
- Kingdom: Animalia
- Phylum: Arthropoda
- Class: Insecta
- Order: Diptera
- Family: Piophilidae
- Genus: Prochyliza
- Species: P. nigrimana

Binomial name
- Prochyliza nigrimana (Meigen, 1826)

Synonyms
- Piophila affinis Meigen, 1830; Piophila morator Melander, 1924; Piophila nigrimana Meigen, 1826; Piophila occipitalis Melander and Spuler, 1917; Piophila privigna Melander, 1924

Species of fly

Prochyliza nigrimana is a species of cheese skippers, insects in the family Piophilidae.
