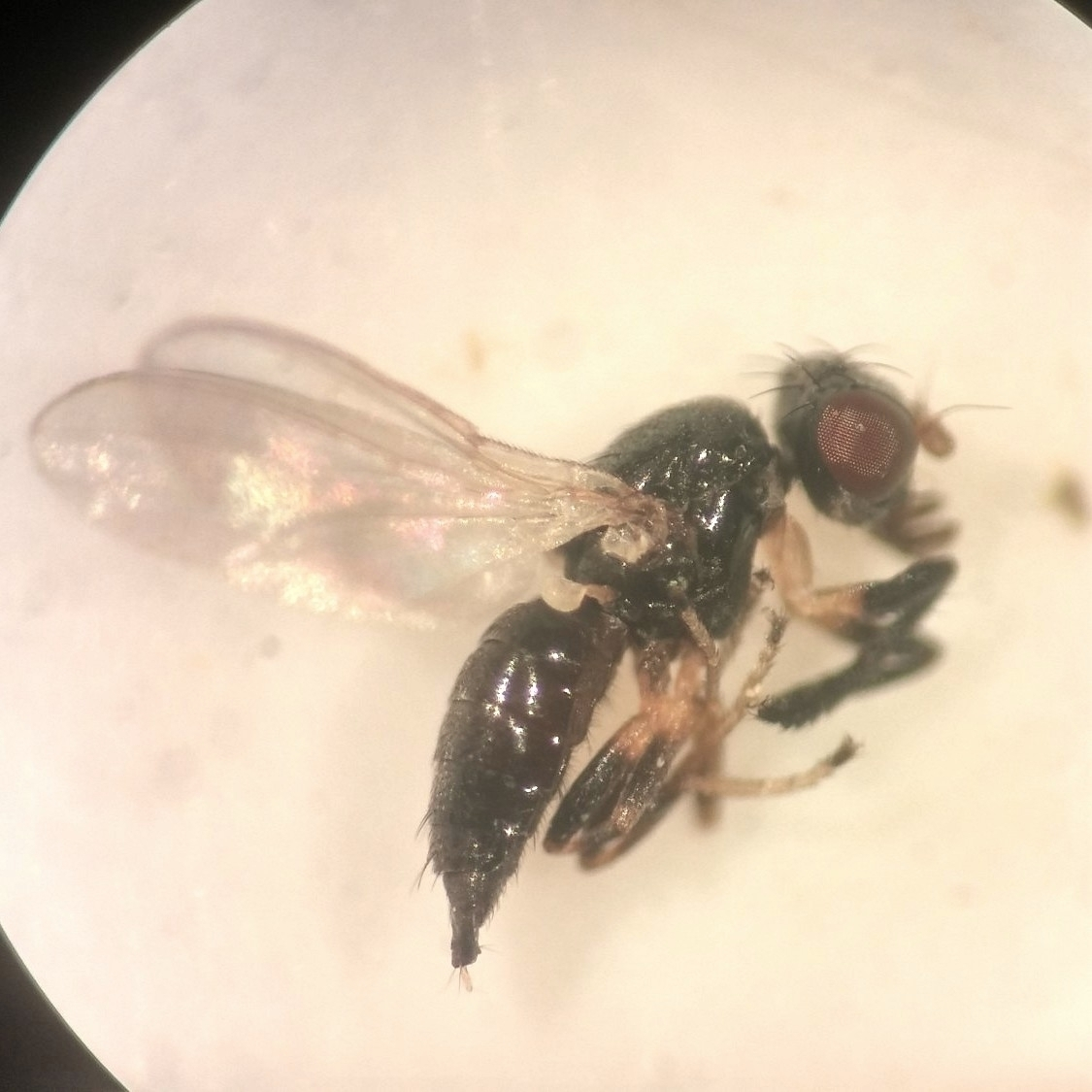

Scientific classification
- Kingdom: Animalia
- Phylum: Arthropoda
- Clade: Pancrustacea
- Class: Insecta
- Order: Diptera
- Family: Piophilidae
- Genus: Protopiophila
- Species: P. litigata

Binomial name
- Protopiophila litigata Bonduriansky, 1995

= Protopiophila litigata =

Species of fly

Protopiophila litigata, also known as the antler fly, is a small species of fly in the family Piophilidae. It is native to North America.

== Range ==
Antler flies are found in Canada, and range from Newfoundland west to Alberta. The species was originally described from Algonquin Provincial Park in Ontario.

== Ecology ==
The antler fly breeds on discarded antlers of moose and other deer. As adaptations to such a scarce and scattered resource, they have several unusual behaviour patterns. For one thing, the males are astonishingly bellicose; the specific epithet litigata reflects the fact — in context it means "aggressive", as in the English word "litigious". On discarded antlers, the males form complex, highly structured aggregations in which a great deal of territorial competition occurs. Some individuals defend stable territories, while others wander in search of females that arrive on antlers to feed, mate, and oviposit. In prime areas of the antler, near oviposition sites (cracks in the antler surface), males spend much of their time battling rival males. They even attack insects much larger than themselves. Another adaptation to life on discarded antlers is an astonishing degree of site fidelity: males spend their entire lives competing on the same antler (only leaving to spend the night in nearby vegetation), making it possible to mark flies individually and obtain longitudinal field data on these tiny insects. This unique ecology made it possible to document senescence in wild insects for the first time.
