= Systema Mycologicum =

Systemic classification of Fungi

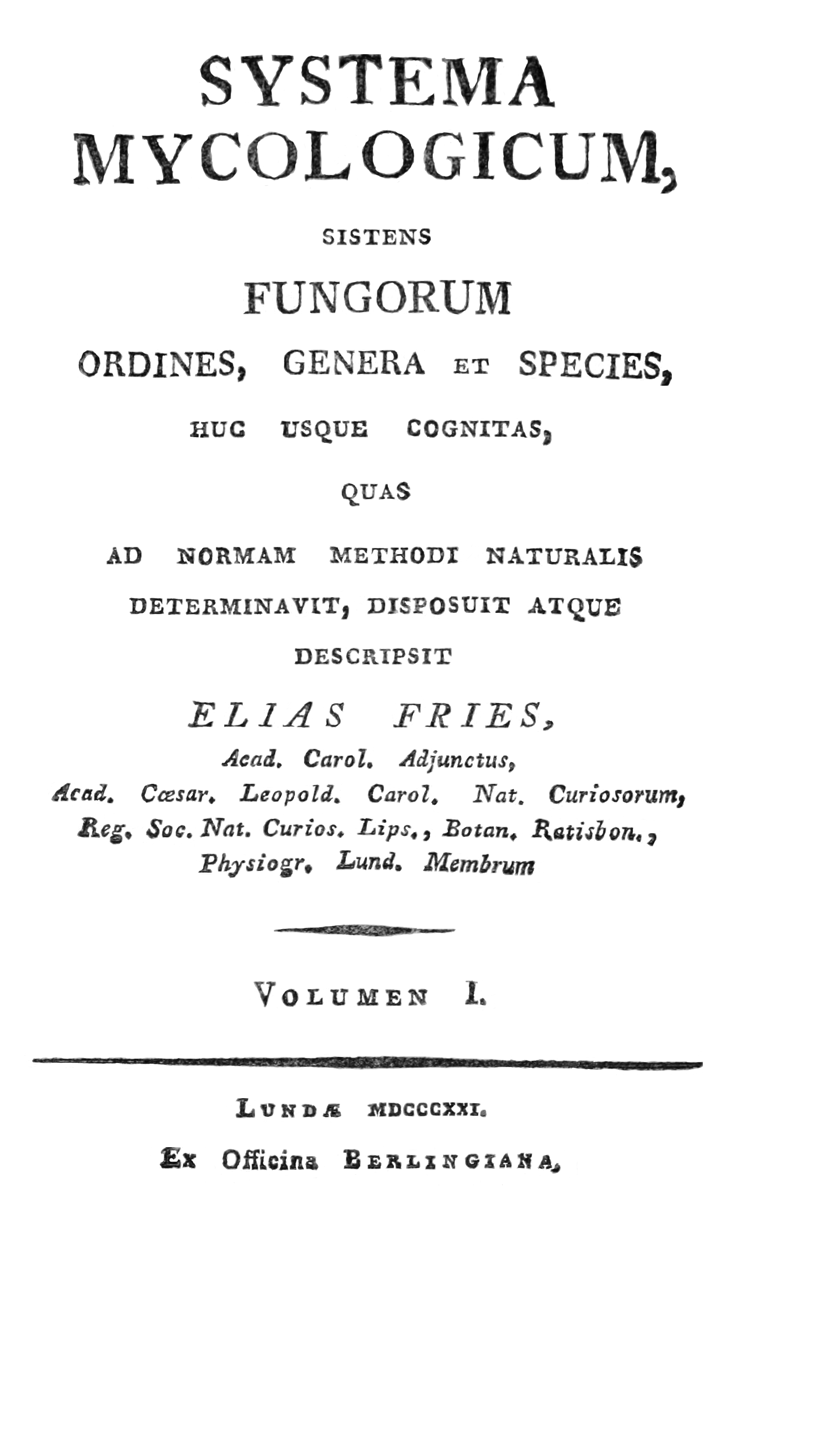
Fries' Systema mycologicum title page

Systema Mycologicum is a systematic classification of fungi drawn up in 1821 by the Swedish mycologist and botanist Elias Fries. It took 11 years to complete.
