= Sexual antagonistic coevolution =

Sexual antagonistic co-evolution is the relationship between males and females where sexual morphology changes over time to counteract the opposite's sex traits to achieve the maximum reproductive success. This has been compared to an arms race between sexes. In many cases, male mating behavior is detrimental to the female's fitness. For example, when insects reproduce by means of traumatic insemination, it is very disadvantageous to the female's health. During mating, males will try to inseminate as many females as possible, however, the more times a female's abdomen is punctured, the less likely she is to survive. Females that possess traits to avoid multiple matings will be more likely to survive, resulting in a change in morphology. In males, genitalia is relatively simple and more likely to vary among generations compared to female genitalia. This results in a new trait that females have to avoid in order to survive.

Additionally, sexual antagonistic co-evolution can be the cause of rapid evolution, as is thought to be the case in seminal proteins known as Acps in species of Drosophila melanogaster. While Acps facilitate the mutually beneficial outcome of increased progeny production, several Acps have detrimental effects on female fitness as they are toxic and shorten her lifespan. This leads to antagonistic co-evolution, as the female must evolve in order to defend herself. When female Drosophila melanogaster are experimentally prevented from co-evolving with males, males rapidly adapt to the static female phenotype. This male adaptation leads to a reduction in female survivorship, which is mediated by an increased rate of remating and increased toxicity of Acps in seminal fluid. Since non-reproductive proteins do not feel the same evolutionary pressure as Acps, they are not evolving nearly as quickly. Consistent with the arms race theory, DNA analyses reveal a two-fold increase in Acp divergence relative to non-reproductive proteins.

== Female co-evolution ==
For many females, reproduction can be very dangerous and disadvantageous as in the case of bed bugs mentioned previously. Therefore, females who possess traits where they can lessen the impacts of male behavior are the ones who will survive and go on to reproduce. There are many ways a female can "defend" herself to the onslaught of potential mates.

=== Spermatheca/pseudospermatheca ===
Females have a very complex and an extremely variable reproductive system, commonly known as a spermatheca. Some species do not have a spermatheca in the traditional sense, but do possess pseudospermatheca. Both forms play an essential role in sperm storage and fertilization. In the family Tingidae, pseudospermatheca are located at the base of the oviduct and are hypothesized to have functioned as spermatheca at one point in time. They now serve as storage units for sperm, where a female can introduce the stored sperm to her eggs when she finds it optimal. It is this factor that has put females in the driver seat of evolution. These organs give females the ability to pick and choose which sperm they will use to fertilize their eggs. Males now have another factor they need to overcome. In the case of D. melanogaster, females will mate multiple times and then expel the excess sperm that she does not need. However, neither the first nor the second mate know if it is his sperm that was dispelled, because at any postcopulatory moment a female can store the sperm of more than one male.

=== Enzymes secreted by females ===
Enzymes secreted by female reproductive tracts may also play a role in sexual antagonistic coevolution with males. In Drosophila species, a large group of enzymes known as serine proteases have been associated with female sperm storage organs (most notably, the spermatheca) through genetic sequencing and analysis. It is hypothesized that these proteases break down various proteins in male seminal fluid. This would result in females choosing for males that can overcome these digestive enzymes, whether through genetic variation or physiological ability to produce greater quality or quantity of sperm.

=== Behavior ===
Before a male even has to begin worrying if the female will use his sperm or not, he must mate with her, which can be a problem within itself. Potential mates often play a game of persistence and resistance. In the case of water striders (genus Gerris) males will harass females and try to grasp them by chasing and lunging at them. Females can be extremely evasive and often fend off these aggressive attacks. Even when a female is finally grasped she continues to struggle. However, this type of avoidance is very costly to a female, so she ends up having to balance the cost of mating and the cost of resistance. However, in species with singly mating females like the fly Prochyliza xanthostoma, the cost of resisting mating is low relative to the benefit of evading a low quality male.

== Male co-evolution ==
Like females, males have developed responses to counter evolutionary adaptations of the opposite sex. Responses in insects can vary in both genitalia and sperm structures, along with variations in behavior.

=== Spiny genitalia ===
Male genitalia evolve more rapidly and divergently in animals. Spiny genitalia can aid in male-male competition. In seed beetles, spiny genitalia help with anchor during copulation and allow a rapid passage to the female's reproductive tract, thus overcoming female barriers to sperm. Females suffer costs as a result of injuries, but males do not benefit directly from harm inflicted on their mates. Damage, such as scarring, increases in the female tract with the number of matings. In seed beetles, a positive correlation exists between the degree of harmfulness of the male's genitalia and the thickness or reinforcement of the wall of the bursa copulatrix in the female's reproductive tract. As a result, females’ connective tissue in the copulatory tract increased in thickness. However, females with a thicker copulatory tract correlated positively to the amount of scarring, suggesting that scarring is a poor measure of costs for females. Females have evolved in other ways such as investing in immunocapacity to help with trauma associated during copulation.

=== Copulation ===
Male bed bugs have a unique way to copulate called traumatic insemination. Males use their intromittent organ to stab and inseminate females through their abdominal wall even though females contain a genital tract. Male bed bugs can also adjust their ejaculate volume and time of copulation through the presence of ejaculates in females to conserve sperm and determine paternity outcomes. Females have evolved a paragenital system to counter traumatic inseminations. The paragenital system contains a mesospermalege where sperm is deposited. The sperm migrates through the blood to the sperm storage site and oviducts, and then to the ovaries to fertilize eggs. Female bed bugs have also evolved physiological by the presence of phagocytic cells in the mesospermalege that ingest sperm after mating.

=== Development time ===
Selection on development time is often sexually antagonistic. In seed beetles, populations differed in development time and growth rate between sexes. Population fitness is not significant to either body size or growth rate, but variation in development time was significantly related to population fitness. In females, genes associated with long development time lead to high fecundity and mate immediately upon eclosion. Males have shorter development time and emerge early (protandry) resulting in greater fertilization opportunities.

=== Sperm tail length ===
Competition between differing male phenotypes also exists at the microscale level. It has been found in Drosophila that there is a positive correlation between the length of male sperm tails and the size of the seminal receptacle found in females. It has been found that females with larger seminal receptacles “choose” sperm with long tails over sperm with short tails. Although females seem to “favor” this trait, no reproductive advantage for long tails has been found except for better correspondence to females with large seminal receptacles. This discrimination is reminiscent of the Fisherian runaway model, as females may choose for long tails based solely on inherited desirability, and would want to pass on that trait, which would improve the sexual success of their male progeny. This also could be an example of the “good genes” model of sexual selection, as correlations have been found between sperm tail length and the physiological condition of the male.

=== Flexibility of genitalia ===
In the case of the Neriid fly, Derocephalus angusticollis, males have been observed to have coevolved to have a flexible aedeagus. In this species females have coiled oviducts that lead to the spermatheca that in turn make it hard for males to reach the area needed to release their sperm. Once copulation is initiated the males are able to unfold their aedeagus and use its flexibility to maneuver the coiled oviducts.
