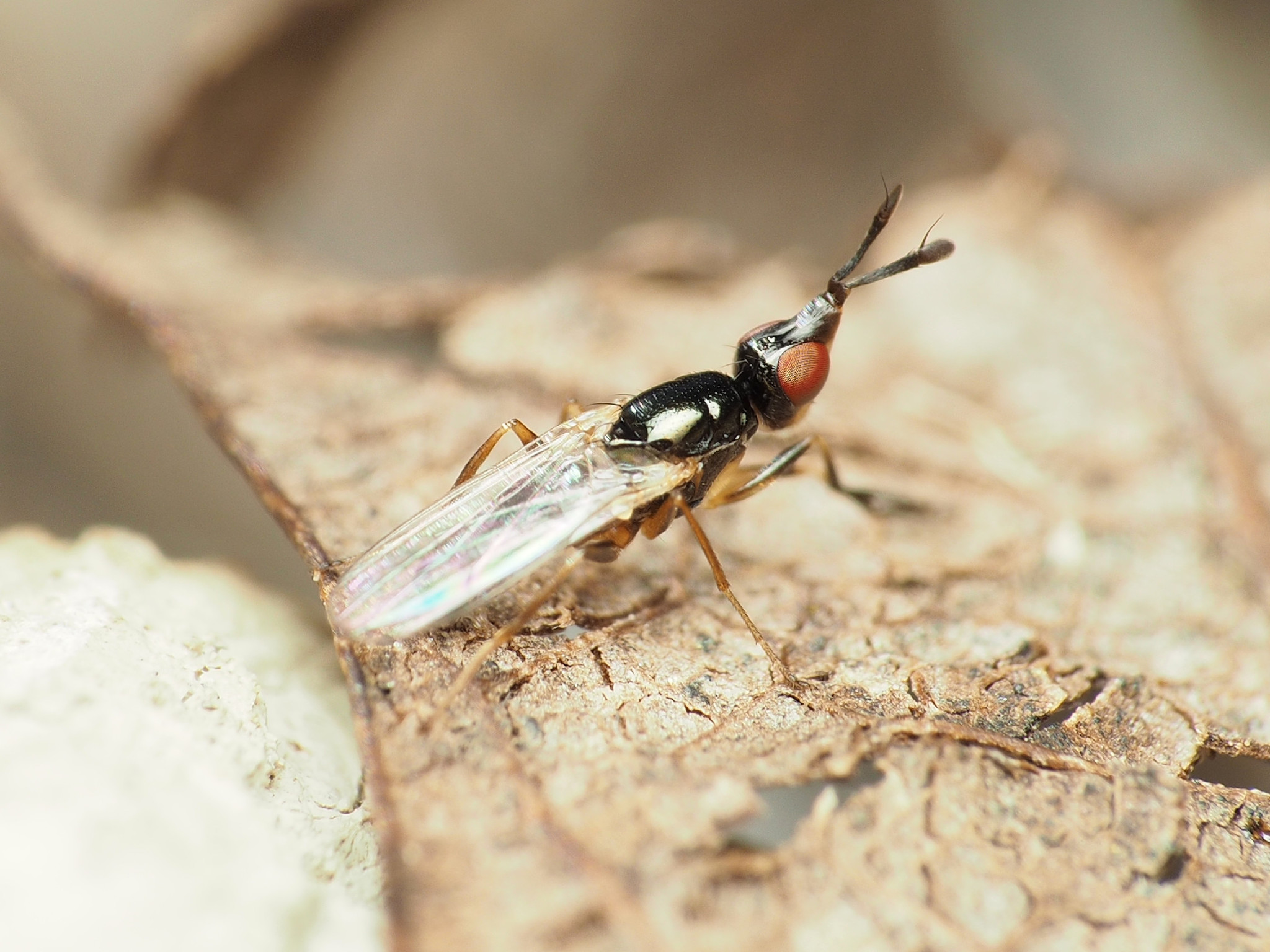

Scientific classification
- Kingdom: Animalia
- Phylum: Arthropoda
- Clade: Pancrustacea
- Class: Insecta
- Order: Diptera
- Family: Piophilidae
- Genus: Prochyliza
- Species: P. xanthostoma

Binomial name
- Prochyliza xanthostoma Walker, 1849

= Prochyliza xanthostoma =

Species of fly

Prochyliza xanthostoma, the waltzing fly, is a species of carrion-feeding cheese skipper, insects in the family Piophilidae and the order Diptera. P. xanthostoma is a member of the genus Prochyliza, which contains eleven species. The adult flies are found through North America and are brown-bodied, with orange and black coloring. Mating occurs on animal carcasses and male perform mating rituals; females engage in ejaculate feeding. The waltzing fly is known for its exaggerated sexual dimorphism and has thus become a prominent model for sexual dimorphism and larval behavior. These organisms are known as cheese skippers because when startled, the larvae (which often infest cured meats and cheese) can leap several inches into the air. P. xanthostoma is an important model organism for sexual selection, larval behavior, and adult reproductive success and survivability.

== Description ==
The adult waltzing flies are narrow, brown-bodied with legs that are orange medial to the body and black lateral to the body. Waltzing flies also have a slip of silver underneath their eyes. The wings are brownish-yellow and the body length ranges from 4 mm to 6 mm.

Waltzing flies have elongated antennae, head, and forelegs. Elongated bodies in P. xanthostoma males are sexually selected for. Unsurprisingly, the degree by which elongated bodies in the male P. xanthostoma is selected for depends on degree of exaggeration of the trait (condition dependence).P. xanthostoma males have a mean head length and width of 1.24 mm and 0.84 mm.P. xanthostoma females have a mean head length and width of 1.04 mm and 1.04 mm. P. xanthostoma males have mean antenna lengths and foretibia lengths of 0.98 mm and 1.04 mm, whereas P. xanthostoma females have mean antenna lengths and foretibia lengths of 0.61 mm and 0.95 mm.

=== Condition dependence ===
Both male and female P. xanthostoma are easily identifiable by their elongated head and thorax. The degree by which the head is elongated is more condition dependent for male than female P. xanthostoma. The degree of elongation of the head in males persists even when controlling for body size. How condition dependence varies between different traits has not yet been elucidated, however it may vary based on the form of selection or the cost of expressing the trait. Also, evidence does not suggest that the evolution of condition dependence was catalyzed by sexual selection.

=== Environmental effects on body shape ===
The specific environmental condition varied in studies investigating environmental dependence on body shape was larval diet. Genetic variation at the loci located on chromosomes are correlated to environmental variation in resource abundance and male P. xanthostoma body shape. The degree of elongation of the head in males persists even when controlling for body size in high-condition (high quality larval diet) males. Changes in environmental factors failed to explain condition dependence on female P. xanthostoma flies.

== Distribution and habitat ==
The waltzing flies are distributed throughout North America, mostly near the carcasses where they lay their eggs, during the spring, summer, and fall.

== Life history ==
The natural larval substrate is carcasses, but waltzing fly larvae are also found in cheeses and cured meats, which makes them a pest.

The waltzing fly sex ratio is strongly biased towards females. Males that survive to adulthood must therefore compete with other males in combat to mate with females in a polygynous mating system.

== Food resources ==
Waltzing fly larvae are found in carrion, especially moose carrion, and this is their natural substrate. However, the larvae are now also found in animal products that humans eat, such as cheese and meats—thus the name "cheese skipper".

Adult waltzing flies eat primarily carrion, but will also consume fungi, cheese, and many other foods. Laboratory experiments on P. xanthostoma approximate cheese fly diets by feeding them lean ground beef that had aged for several days.

== Mating ==
Mating occurs during the spring in sun spots on moose carcasses. Females with unfertilized ovules lie in sunny spots and males attempt to woo the females while fighting amongst each other for access. A male waltzing fly will try to attract a female by dancing side-to-side in front of her and lifting the front portion of his body upwards. If the female accepts him as a mate, she raises her forelegs and he touches his forelegs to hers. The male waltzing fly would then propel himself onto the female's back and rubs the female's abdomen. Then, he places his ejaculate into the female's ovule, after which the female ingests the ejaculate. The ejaculate contains sperm and fluids from accessory glands. The evolutionary benefit of the female ingesting the male's ejaculate is unclear, though studies found female waltzing flies that ingested ejaculate has had higher fitness than flies that were prevented from ingesting ejaculate. Males may benefit from ejaculate feeding by decreasing the number of eggs females have available for other mates, thereby increasing his paternity. The male, however, makes no observed attempt to urge the female to ingest his ejaculate. Overall, mating typically occurs for 4 to 6 minutes in total. Afterwards, females oviposit, the larvae grow on the carcass. Females typically only mate once.

=== Ejaculate feeding ===
The time until oviposition, probability of oviposition, and chance of survival are all affected by whether or not female waltzing flies feed on male ejaculate during mating. The ejaculate feeding behavior leads to oviposition occurring more quickly compared to when the female waltzing flies did not ingest the ejaculate. Female waltzing flies that fed on ejaculate also had higher survival than flies that did not feed on ejaculate.

Ejaculate feeding has been suggested as originating from sexual conflict. Waltzing fly females typically only mate once, and the sperm may have evolved to ensure the waltzing fly male's paternity by preventing multiple mating. There are several possible reasons why lack of female re-mating may be a form of sexual conflict, including substances in the ejaculate that decrease the chance of a female's re-mating, evolutionary response to male coercion, and manipulation. Females decrease re-mating rate by exhibiting resistance behaviors such as moving or flying away when a male is attempting to copulate. Researchers therefore hypothesize there is antagonistic coevolution between the ejaculate in male waltzing flies and the female re-mating rate.

=== Sexual dimorphism ===
==== Sexually dimorphic traits in males ====
In waltzing flies, sexual dimorphism primarily seen is exaggerated elongation of male appendages. Male head capsules, forelegs, and antennae are long and narrow, which helps increase success in male-to-male combat as well as in courting female waltzing flies for mating. Female P. xanthostoma have been observed to prefer male P.xanthostoma with more a more elongated body, which suggests a more elongated body in male P.xanthostoma could be a sign of good genes. Though longer bodies in male.P. xanthostoma are sexually selected for, elongated bodies are considered a nonsexual trait since male P. xanthostoma do not use their bodies to directly compete sexually with other males. Furthermore, maintaining large body sizes is costly for male P. xanthostoma flies to maintain, which gives further evidence that the trait is a sexual trait. There is an evolutionary trade-off related to head length; elaborately long heads are sexually selected for in waltzing fly males (females prefer them) whereas elongated heads are selected against in the combat between males.

In male P. xanthostoma, these sexually selected for traits may improve male P. xanthostoma reproductive success but decrease overall fitness. Some sexually selected traits are more costly to male P. xanthostoma than others. For example, elongated heads in male P. xanthostoma may be more detrimental than elongated antenna.

==== Sexually dimorphic traits in females ====
Female P. xanthostoma flies that were fed a high quality diet exhibited shorter antennae with respect to their body size relative to female P. xanthostoma flies that were fed a low quality diet.

=== Male combat ===
Combat between males involves two males standing up on their hind legs and swinging at each other with their heads and antennae after a period of display that is likely used to determine which fly larger than the other. These battles can last up to two minutes, and the winner earns the right to court females.

== Genetics ==
=== Genetic effects on body shape ===
Genetic variation at loci on the chromosomes of P. xanthostoma flies are correlated with efficiency of the acquisition of resources as well as male body shape. More specifically, genetically, head length and width in males are negatively correlated to condition (high or low). However, genetic factors failed to explain condition dependence in females.
