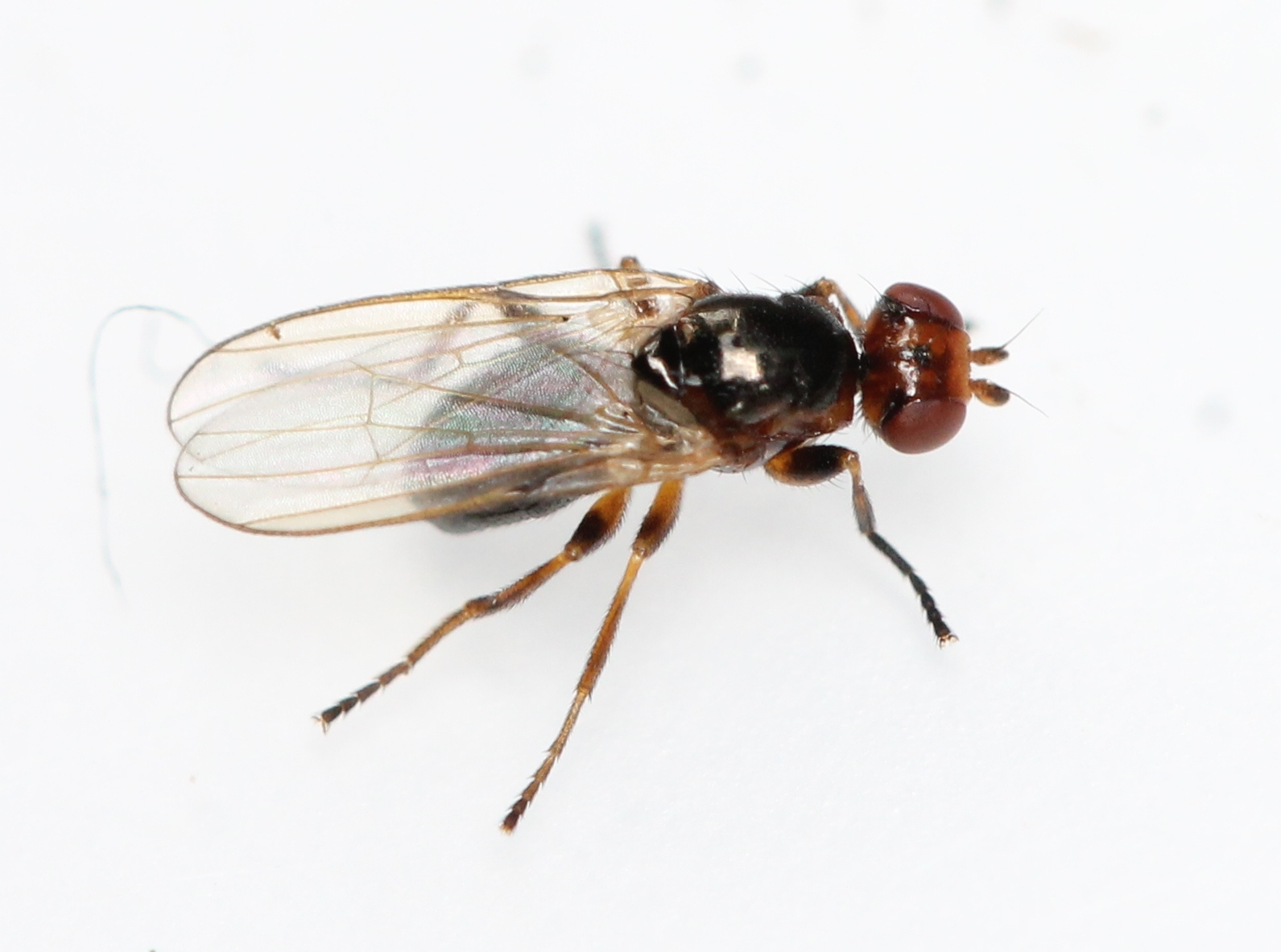
- Allopiophila luteata

Scientific classification
- Kingdom: Animalia
- Phylum: Arthropoda
- Clade: Pancrustacea
- Class: Insecta
- Order: Diptera
- Family: Piophilidae
- Tribe: Piophilini
- Genus: Allopiophila; Hendel, 1917

Type species
- Piophila luteata Haliday, 1833

Synonyms
- Arctopiophila Duda, 1924; Boreopiophila Frey, 1930; Parapiophila McAlpine, 1977

= Allopiophila =

Genus of flies

Allopiophila is a genus of small flies in the family Piophilidae.

== Species ==
- A. arctica (Holmgren, 1883)
- A. atrifrons (Melander & Spuler, 1917)
- A. baechlii (Merz, 1996)
- A. calceata (Duda, 1924)
- A. dudai (Frey, 1930)
- A. flavipes (Zetterstedt, 1847)
- A. fulviceps (Holmgren, 1883)
- A. lonchaeoides (Zetterstedt, 1838)
- A. luteata Haliday, 1833
- A. nigerrima (Lundbeck, 1901)
- A. nitidissima (Melander & Spuler, 1917)
- A. pappi Ozerov, 2004
- A. pectiniventris (Duda, 1924)
- A. penicillata (Steyskal, 1964)
- A. pseudovulgaris (Ozerov, 1989)
- A. testacea (Melander, 1924)
- A. tomentosa (Frey, 1930)
- A. vernicosa (Ozerov & Bartak, 1993)
- A. vulgaris (Fallén, 1820)
- A. xanthopoda (Melander & Spuler, 1917)
