= 1821 in science =

The year 1821 in science and technology involved some significant events, listed below.

== Astronomy ==
- Johann Franz Encke calculates that Comet Encke has a periodic orbit, the second comet after Comet Halley for which this has been discovered.
- Alexis Bouvard detects irregularities in the orbit of Uranus.

== Biology ==
- Swedish mycologist Elias Magnus Fries begins publication of Systema Mycologicum, a key work in the modern taxonomy of mushrooms.
- William Jackson Hooker publishes Flora Scotica; or, A description of Scottish plants.
- Prideaux John Selby begins publication of Illustrations of British Ornithology, the first set of life-sized illustrations of British birds.

== Chemistry ==
- John Kidd describes the properties of the substance which he calls naphthaline.
- Pierre Jean Robiquet, Joseph Bienaimé Caventou and Pierre Joseph Pelletier isolate caffeine.

== Geography and exploration ==
- January 28 – Russian explorer Fabian Gottlieb von Bellingshausen discovers Alexander I Land in Antarctica, later determined to be the world's second-largest uninhabited island.
- December 6 – The South Orkney Islands are discovered by George Powell and Nathaniel Palmer.
- December 15 – The world's first geographical society, the Société de géographie, is established in Paris.
- William Parry starts his second voyage to find the Northwest Passage.

== Geology ==
- Ignaz Venetz proposes his ice age theory.
- Pierre Berthier discovers bauxite.

== Mathematics ==
- Augustin-Louis Cauchy gives the first complete presentation of calculus using limits.

== Medicine ==
- Charles Bell presents a paper to the Royal Society, "On the Nerves, Giving an Account of some Experiments on their Structure and Functions, which led to a New Arrangement of the System", identifying Bell's palsy; and also publishes his book Illustrations of the Great Operations of Surgery: Trepan, Hernia, Amputation, Aneurism, and Lithotomy (illustrated by himself).
- Jean Marc Gaspard Itard publishes Traité des maladies d'oreille et de l'audition in Paris, a major work on otology.

== Paleontology ==
- Mary Anning finds the first ever plesiosaur fossil at Lyme Regis.
- William Buckland finds the remains of a hyena's den in Yorkshire, containing the bones of lions, elephants and rhinoceros.

== Physics ==
- Michael Faraday discovers electromagnetic rotation.
- Thomas Johann Seebeck discovers the thermoelectric effect.
- Augustin Fresnel shows that light is made up of a traverse wave motion.
- John Herapath publishes a kinetic theory of gases.

== Technology ==
- Antide Janvier publishes his textbook on the theory and practice of watchmaking, Manuel Chronometrique, ou, precis de ce qui concerne le temps, ses divisions, ses mesures, leurs usages, etc. in Paris.

== Awards ==
- Copley Medal: Edward Sabine; John Herschel

== Births ==
- May 16 – Pafnuty Chebyshev (died 1894), Russian mathematician.
- May 25 – Henri Alexis Brialmont (died 1903), Limburgish military engineer.
- May 26 – Amalie Dietrich (died 1891), German naturalist.
- April 27 – Henry Willis (died 1901), English organ builder.
- August 16 – Arthur Cayley (died 1895), English mathematician.
- August 31 – Hermann von Helmholtz (died 1894), German physicist.
- October 13 – Rudolf Virchow (died 1902), German biologist.
- November 18 – Franz Brünnow (died 1891), German astronomer.
- December 21 – Samuel Haughton (died 1897), Irish scientific polymath.

== Deaths ==
- April 20 – Franz Karl Achard (born 1753), German chemist.
- October 4 – Marie-Louise Lachapelle (born 1769), French midwife.
