= Evolutionary arms race =

Concept in Evolution

In evolutionary biology, an evolutionary arms race is an ongoing struggle between competing sets of co-evolving genes, phenotypic and behavioral traits that develop escalating adaptations and counter-adaptations against each other, resembling the geopolitical concept of an arms race. These are often described as examples of positive feedback. The co-evolving gene sets may be in different species, as in an evolutionary arms race between a predator species and its prey, or a parasite and its host. Alternatively, the arms race may be between members of the same species, as in the manipulation/sales resistance model of communication or as in runaway evolution or Red Queen effects. One example of an evolutionary arms race is in sexual conflict between the sexes, often described with the term Fisherian runaway. Thierry Lodé emphasized the role of such antagonistic interactions in evolution leading to character displacements and antagonistic coevolution.

== Symmetrical versus asymmetrical arms races ==
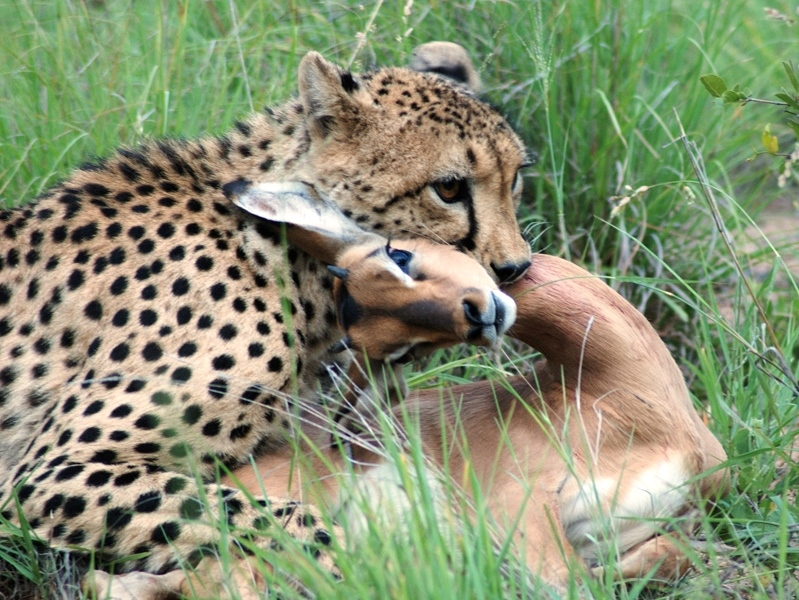
An example of an asymmetrical arms race is cheetahs (Acinonyx jubatus) evolving to become better hunters and gazelle evolving to evade being killed.

Arms races may be classified as either symmetrical or asymmetrical. In a symmetrical arms race, selection pressure acts on participants in the same direction. An example of this is trees growing taller as a result of competition for light, where the selective advantage for either species is increased height. An asymmetrical arms race involves contrasting selection pressures, such as the case of cheetahs (Acinonyx jubatus) and gazelles, where cheetahs evolve to be better at hunting and killing while gazelles evolve not to hunt and kill, but rather to evade capture.

== Host–parasite dynamic ==
Selective pressure between two species can include host-parasite coevolution. This antagonistic relationship leads to the necessity for the pathogen to have the best virulent alleles to infect the organism and for the host to have the best resistant alleles to survive parasitism. As a consequence, allele frequencies vary through time depending on the size of virulent and resistant populations (fluctuation of genetic selection pressure) and generation time (mutation rate) where some genotypes are preferentially selected thanks to the individual fitness gain. Genetic change accumulation in both populations explains a constant adaptation to have lower fitness costs and avoid extinction in accordance with the Red Queen's hypothesis suggested by Leigh Van Valen in 1973.

== Examples ==
=== The Phytophthora infestans/Bintje potato interaction ===
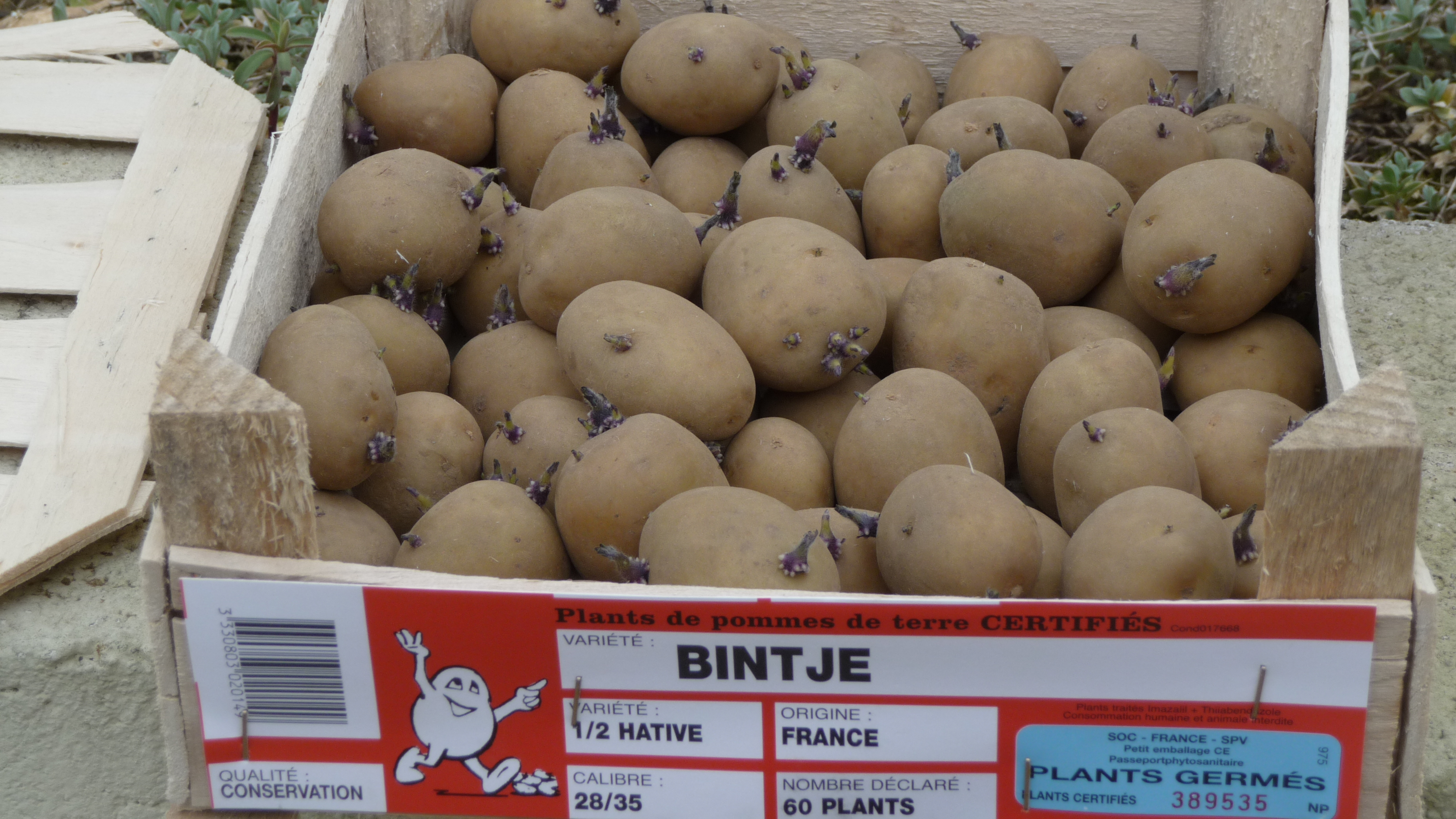
Bintje potatoes

The Bintje potato is derived from a cross between Munstersen and Fransen potato varieties. It was created in the Netherlands in the early 20th century and now is mainly cultivated in the North of France and Belgium. The oomycete Phytophthora infestans is responsible for the potato blight, in particular during the European famine in 1840. Zoospores (mobile spores, characteristics of oomycetes) are liberated by zoosporangia provided from a mycelium and brought by rain or wind before infecting tubers and leaves. Black colours appear on the plant because of the infection of its cellular system necessary for the multiplication of the oomycete infectious population. The parasite contains virulent-avirulent allelic combinations in several microsatellite loci, likewise the host contains several multiloci resistance genes (or R gene). That interaction is called gene-for-gene relationship and is, in general, widespread in plant diseases. Expression of genetic patterns in the two species is a combination of resistance and virulence characteristics in order to have the best survival rate.

=== Bats and moths ===
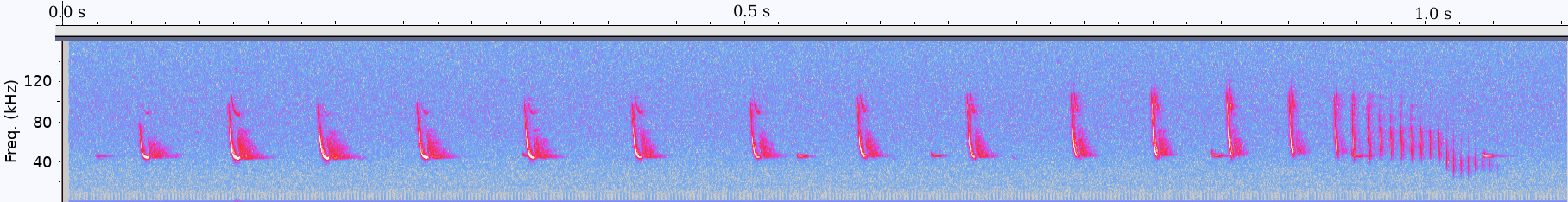
Spectrogram of Pipistrellus pipistrellus bat vocalizations during prey approach. The recording covers a total of 1.1 seconds; lower main frequency ca. 45 kHz (as typical for a common pipistrelle). About 150 milliseconds before final contact time between and duration of calls are becoming much shorter ("feeding buzz"). Corresponding audio file:

Bats have evolved to use echolocation to detect and catch their prey. Moths have in turn evolved to detect the echolocation calls of hunting bats, and evoke evasive flight maneuvers, or reply with their own ultrasonic clicks to confuse the bat's echolocation. The Arctiinae subfamily of Erebid moths uniquely respond to bat echolocation in three prevailing hypotheses: startle, sonar jamming, and acoustic aposematic defense. All these differences depend on specific environmental settings and the type of echolocation call; however, these hypotheses are not mutually exclusive and can be used by the same moth for defense.

The different defense mechanisms have been shown to be directly responsive to bat echolocation through sympatry studies. In places with spatial or temporal isolation between bats and their prey, the moth species hearing mechanism tends to regress. Fullard et al. (2004) compared adventive and endemic Noctiid moth species in a bat-free habitat to ultrasound and found that all of the adventive species reacted to the ultrasound by slowing their flight times, while only one of the endemic species reacted to the ultrasound signal, indicating a loss of hearing over time in the endemic population. However, the degree of loss or regression depends on the amount of evolutionary time and whether or not the moth species has developed secondary uses for hearing.

Some bats are known to use clicks at frequencies above or below moths' hearing ranges. This is known as the allotonic frequency hypothesis. It argues that the auditory systems in moths have driven their bat predators to use higher or lower frequency echolocation to circumvent the moth hearing. Barbastelle bats have evolved to use a quieter mode of echolocation, calling at a reduced volume and further reducing the volume of their clicks as they close in on prey moths. The lower volume of clicks reduces the effective successful hunting range, but results in a significantly higher number of moths caught than other, louder bat species. Moths have further evolved the ability to discriminate between high and low echolocation click rates, which indicates whether the bat has just detected their presence or is actively pursuing them. This allows them to decide whether or not defensive ultrasonic clicks are worth the time and energy expenditure.

=== The rough-skinned newt and the common garter snake ===
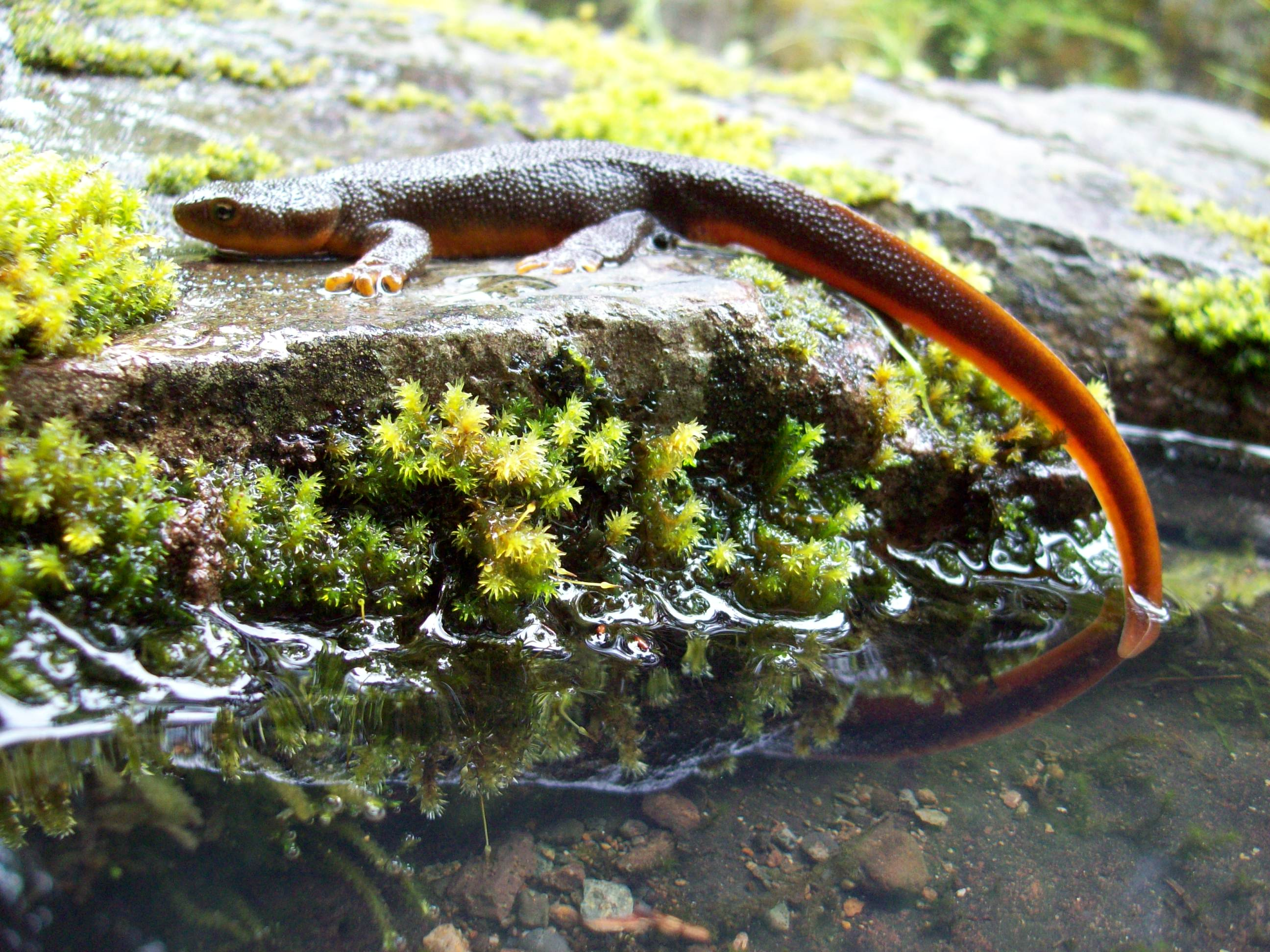
Rough-skinned newt

Rough-skinned newts have skin glands that contain a powerful nerve poison, tetrodotoxin, as an anti-predator adaptation. Throughout much of the newt's range, the common garter snake is resistant to the toxin. While in principle the toxin binds to a tube-shaped protein that acts as a sodium channel in the snake's nerve cells, a mutation in several snake populations configures the protein in such a way as to hamper or prevent binding of the toxin, conferring resistance. In turn, resistance creates a selective pressure that favors newts that produce more toxin. That in its turn imposes a selective pressure favoring snakes with mutations conferring even greater resistance. This evolutionary arms race has resulted in the newts producing levels of toxin far in excess of that needed to kill any other predator.

In populations where garter snakes and newts live together, higher levels of tetrodotoxin and resistance to it are observed in the two species respectively. Where the species are separated, the toxin levels and resistance are lower. While isolated garter snakes have lower resistance, they still demonstrate an ability to resist low levels of the toxin, suggesting an ancestral predisposition to tetrodotoxin resistance. The lower levels of resistance in separated populations suggest a fitness cost of both toxin production and resistance. Snakes with high levels of tetrodotoxin resistance crawl more slowly than isolated populations of snakes, making them more vulnerable to predation. The same pattern is seen in isolated populations of newts, which have less toxin in their skin. There are geographic hotspots where levels of tetrodotoxin and resistance are extremely high, showing a close interaction between newts and snakes.

=== Predator whelk and the hard-shelled bivalve prey ===
Predator whelk used their own shell to open the shell of their prey, oftentimes breaking both shells in the process. This led to better fitness for larger-shelled prey. However, the whelk's population then selected for individuals who were more efficient at opening larger-shelled prey. This example is an excellent example of an asymmetrical arms race, because while the prey is evolving a physical trait (larger shells), the predators are adapting through the whelks' ability to open those larger shells.

=== Floodplain death adders and separate species of frogs ===
Floodplain death adders eat three types of frogs: one nontoxic, one producing mucus when taken by the predator, and the highly toxic frogs. However, the snakes have also found that if they wait to consume their toxic prey, the potency decreases. In this specific case, the asymmetry enabled the snakes to overcome the chemical defenses of the toxic frogs after their death. The results of the study showed that the snake became accustomed to the differences in the frogs by their hold and release timing, always holding the nontoxic, while always releasing the highly toxic frogs, with the frogs that discharge mucus somewhere in between. The snakes spent more time gaped between the release of the highly toxic frogs than the short gaped time between the release of the frogs that discharge mucus. Therefore, the snakes have a much higher advantage of being able to cope with the different frogs defensive mechanisms, while the frogs could eventually increase the potency of their toxic knowing the snakes would adapt to that change as well, such as the snakes having venom themselves for the initial attack. The coevolution is still highly asymmetrical because of the advantage the predators have over their prey.

== Introduced species ==
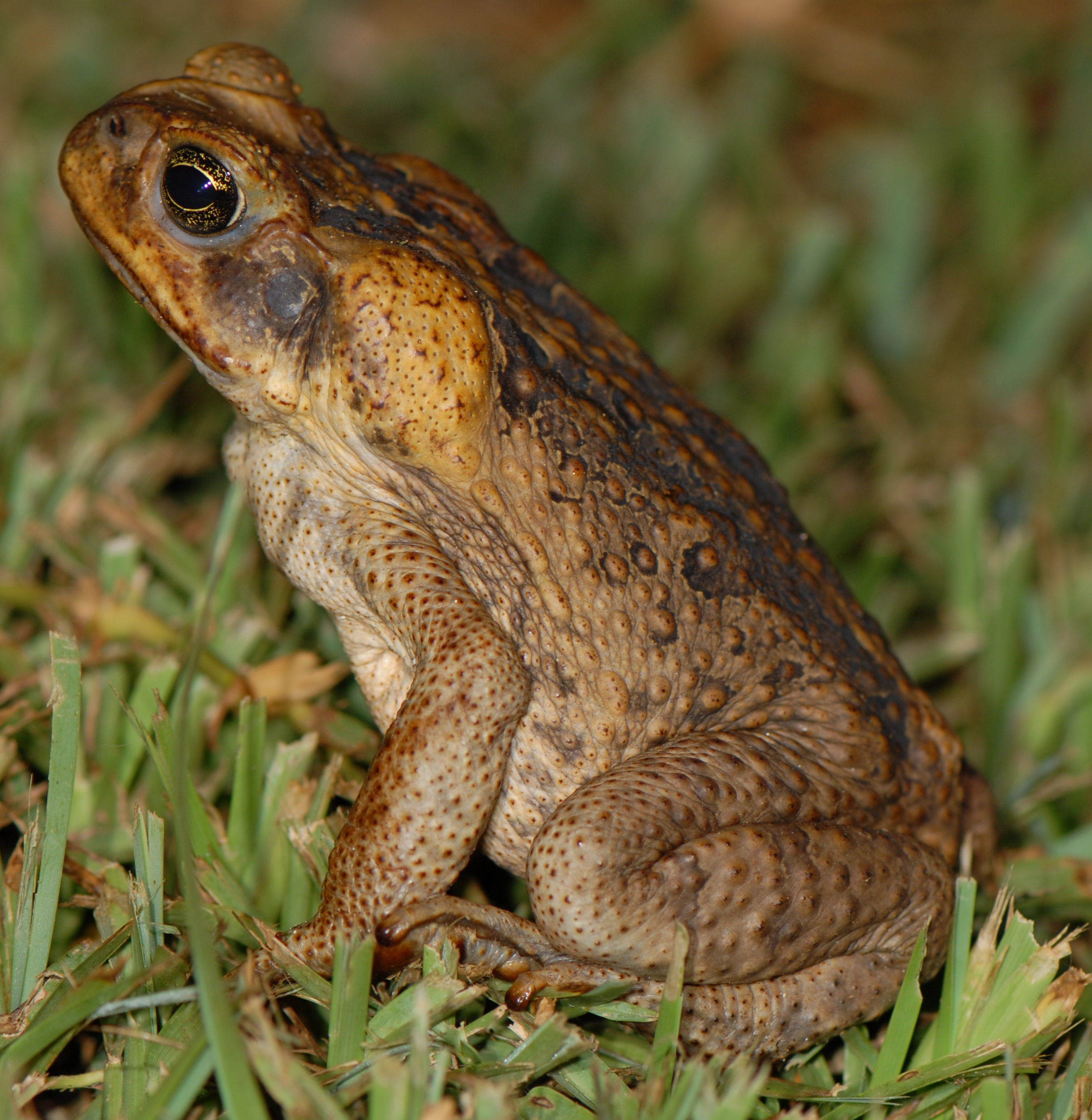
Cane toads (Rhinella marina) have experienced a massive population explosion in Australia due to the lack of competition.

When a species has not been subject to an arms race previously, it may be at a severe disadvantage and face extinction well before it could ever hope to adapt to a new predator, competitor, or parasite. One species may have been in evolutionary struggles for millions of years (by, say predators), while another might never have faced such pressures (for example an island species). This is a common problem in isolated ecosystems such as Australia or the Hawaiian Islands. In Australia, many invasive species, such as cane toads and rabbits, have spread rapidly due to a lack of competition and predatory pressure. For example, Australian predators lack adaptations to cane toad bufotenine, allowing the invasive species to spread. However, there is evidence of some predator species beginning to adapt in various ways to dealing with the cane toad's defence mechanisms.

== See also ==
- Anti-predator adaptation
- Parasite–host interactions
- Parent–offspring conflict
- Antimicrobial resistance
- Evolutionary anachronism
