= Jane Kirkaldy =

Science educator in England

Jane Willis Kirkaldy (1869 – June 19, 1932) was a science educator at various colleges in Oxford for thirty six years. She was one of the first women to obtain first-class honours in the natural sciences and contributed greatly to the education of the generation of English women scientists.

== Early life and education ==
Born sometime in 1869, Kirkaldy later attended Wimbledon High School where she worked as the assistant mistress. She went on to attend Somerville College in Oxford from 1887 to 1891, graduating with a B.S. with honours, one of the first two women to do so.

== Career ==
Kirkaldy worked as a science lecturer and visiting teacher in London, also working as private tutor for a short time at Castle Howard. She later returned to Oxford to serve as the women's tutor for students in the School of Natural Sciences at the Association for the Education of Women from 1894 to 1930. She also served as a tutor and lecturer to the Oxford Women's Societies. Outside of tutoring and lecturing, in 1929 she was made an honorary fellow of Somerville College in 1929 and sat on the council of St. Hugh's College. She wrote multiple books, the translation of J. E. V. Boas's Textbook of Zoology in 1896 with E. Pollard, as well as co-authoring An Introduction to the Study of Biology in 1909 with I. M. Drummond.

== Legacy ==
In her will, she left money to Oxford University for the creation of the Jane Willis Kirkaldy prize in 1936. A prize for natural science was created in her honour at Somerville College.
