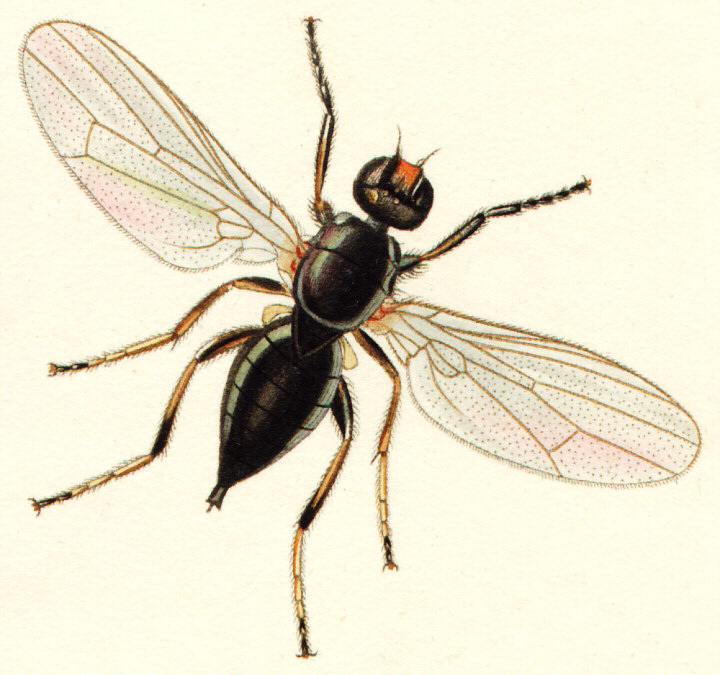
- Piophila casei

Scientific classification
- Domain: Eukaryota
- Kingdom: Animalia
- Phylum: Arthropoda
- Class: Insecta
- Order: Diptera
- Family: Piophilidae
- Tribe: Piophilini
- Genus: Piophila; Fallén, 1810

Type species
- Musca casei Linnaeus, 1758

= Piophila =

Genus of flies

Piophila is a genus of small flies which includes the species known as the cheese fly. Both Piophila species feed on carrion, including human corpses.

== Description ==
Piophila are small dark flies with unmarked wings. The setulae (fine hairs) on the thorax are confined to three distinct rows.

== Species ==
There are two species in the genus Piophila:

- Piophila casei (Linnaeus, 1758), the cheese fly
- Piophila megastigmata J. McAlpine, 1978
