= Prochyliza =

Scientific classification
- Kingdom: Animalia
- Phylum: Arthropoda
- Class: Insecta
- Order: Diptera
- Family: Piophilidae
- Genus: Prochyliza; Walker, 1849

Genus of flies

Prochyliza is a genus of waltzing flies in the family Piophilidae. There are about 11 described species in Prochyliza.

== Species ==
These 11 species belong to the genus Prochyliza:

- Prochyliza azteca McAlpine, 1977
- Prochyliza brevicornis Melander, 1924
- Prochyliza georgekaplani Martin-Vega
- Prochyliza ignifera
- Prochyliza inca McAlpine, 1977
- Prochyliza lundbecki (Duda, 1924)
- Prochyliza nigricornis (Meigen, 1826)
- Prochyliza nigricoxa (Melander & Spuler, 1917)
- Prochyliza nigrimana (Meigen, 1826)
- Prochyliza varipes (Meigen, 1830)
- Prochyliza xanthostoma Walker, 1849
