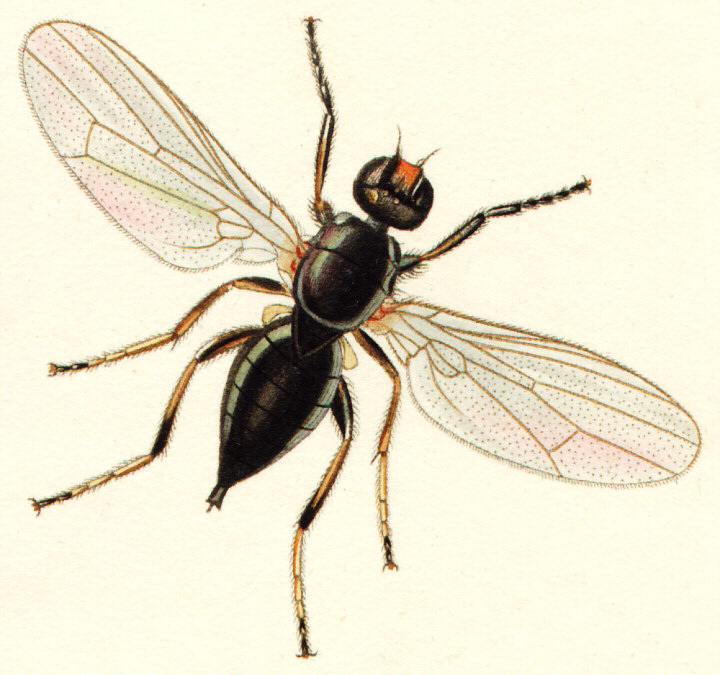
- Illustration of Piophila casei

Scientific classification
- Kingdom: Animalia
- Phylum: Arthropoda
- Clade: Pancrustacea
- Class: Insecta
- Order: Diptera
- Family: Piophilidae
- Genus: Piophila
- Species: P. casei

Binomial name
- Piophila casei (Linnaeus, 1758)

= Cheese fly =

Species of fly

The cheese fly, cheese skipper, or ham skipper (Piophila casei) is a species of fly from the family Piophilidae whose larvae are known to infest cured meats, smoked or salted fish, cheeses and carrion. On the Mediterranean island of Sardinia, the larvae are intentionally introduced into pecorino sardo cheese to produce the characteristic casu martzu.

If consumed by humans, the larvae have a chance to survive in the intestine, causing enteric pseudomyiasis, though no such cases have been linked to casu martzu dishes. The larvae may also carry harmful microorganisms that, when consumed, could cause infections.

== Description ==
Adult male cheese flies are usually 4.4–4.5 mm (0.17–0.18 in) long, with females slightly larger at 5.0–5.2 mm (0.197–0.205 in) long. The body is primarily a metallic black bronze in color, with two pale yellow iridescent wings that lie flat upon the fly's abdomen when at rest. The head has short antennae and red compound eyes, with yellow patches on the lower face. The legs are yellow-brown and are covered in short spines.

The cheese fly larvae are cylindrical and can appear white or cream, with black mouthparts.

== Life history ==
Larvae have three instars, with late-instar larvae capable of greatest dispersal. When fully grown, they are 9–10 mm (0.35–0.39 in) long, 1 mm (0.039 in) wide, and have 13 segments. When disturbed, or dispersing to sites for pupation, the larvae can leap 10–12 cm (3.9–4.7 in) by hooking their mouths into a nearby surface or into their own posterior segments, contracting their muscles, and releasing, flinging themselves forward—this locomotion technique is believed to be what has led to the name "cheese skippers".

Larvae are detritivores, feeding on protein rich sources, including meats, cheeses, and carrion. They seek out dark, dry areas for pupation, which lasts around 12 days. Adult larvae can overwinter before pupation.

In cases of myiasis, larvae that are embedded in unrefrigerated meats and cheeses can be ingested, then pupate and emerge as adults while still in the host's alimentary tract.

== Cheese flies and food safety ==
P. casei are considered pests in the meat and cheese industries. Female cheese flies lay eggs on meats and cheeses, which, when hatched, produce burrowing larvae that are difficult to detect in food products until they grow large enough to disperse.

Research conducted on methods for preventing the oviposition and larval infestation of P. casei in cured meats and cheeses suggests the use of certain plant essential oils, from plants such as Mentha canadensis, to prevent larval growth. Alternatively, regulating the microbiome present in food processing facilities can remove the microbial symbionts of P. casei, whose metabolic wastes provide food for P. casei larvae.
