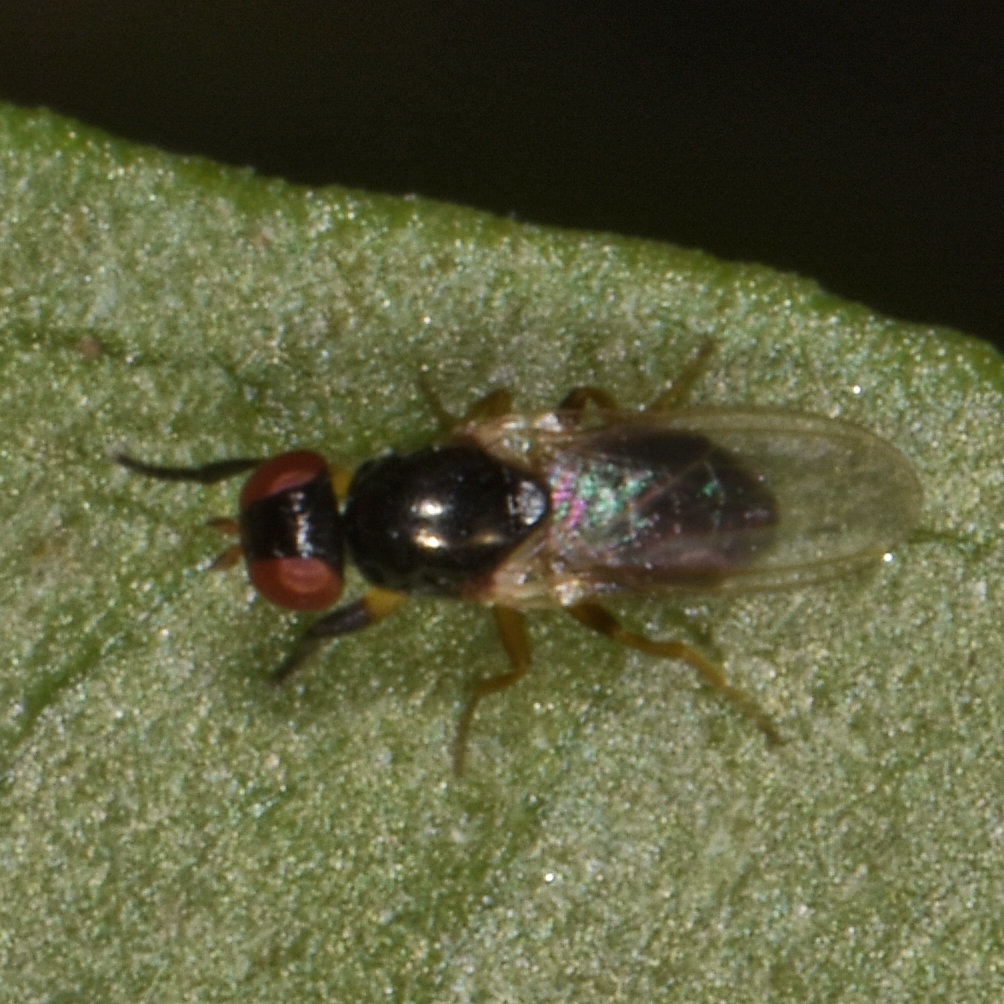
- Protopiophila latipes

Scientific classification
- Domain: Eukaryota
- Kingdom: Animalia
- Phylum: Arthropoda
- Class: Insecta
- Order: Diptera
- Family: Piophilidae
- Genus: Protopiophila; Duda, 1924

Synonyms
- Clusina Curran, 1934

= Protopiophila =

Genus of flies

Protopiophila is a genus of cheese skippers (insects in the family Piophilidae). There are eleven described species in Protopiophila.

== Species ==
These species belong to the genus Protopiophila:

- Protopiophila aethiopica (Hennig, 1951)
- Protopiophila atrichosa J. McAlpine, 1977
- Protopiophila australis Harrison, 1960^{i g}
- Protopiophila contecta (Walker, 1960)
- Protopiophila latipes (Meigen, 1838)^{i b}
- Protopiophila leucodactyla (Hennig, 1954)
- Protopiophila litigata Bonduriansky, 1995
- Protopiophila nigriventris (Curran, 1934)
- Protopiophila pallida J. McAlpine, 1977
- Protopiophila scutellata Harrison, 1960
- Protopiophila vitrea D. McAlpine, 1989

Data sources: i = ITIS, c = Catalogue of Life, g = GBIF, b = Bugguide.net
