= Jacob van der Hoeden =

Dutch-born Israeli veterinary research scientist

- יעקב ואן דר הודן
- Born: July 27, 1891; Utrecht, Netherlands
- Died: February 1, 1968 (aged 76); Israel
- Occupation: Veterinary research scientist
- Known for: Establishing the Veterinary Institute in Israel
- Awards: Israel Prize (1961); Zimmerman Prize (1961)

Jacob van der Hoeden (Hebrew: יעקב ואן דר הודן; 27 July 1891 in Utrecht – 1 February 1968) was a Dutch-born Israeli veterinary research scientist.

== Biography ==
Jacob (Jaap) Van der Hoeden was born into a Jewish family in the Netherlands in 1891. He completed his doctorate in 1921. Van der Hoeden, together with his four children, survived the Holocaust thanks to the help of Dutch Christians who hid the family in various places. However, his wife died of illness prior to the end of World War II.

== Veterinary career ==
Van der Hoeden served from 1924 to 1929 as a senior researcher at the Dutch national public health institute and a professor of veterinary medicine at Utrecht University. In 1929, he was appointed to head the university's hospital laboratories and, in 1932, was elected to the Dutch Society for Natural Sciences. He became a leading authority on diseases that pass from animals to humans.

In 1948, the Minister of Agriculture in the interim government of the State of Israel invited van der Hoeden to establish the Veterinary Institute in Israel. In 1955, he moved to the Israel Institute for Biological Research in Ness Ziona, where he worked until his retirement in 1966.

Van der Hoeden died in 1968 in Israel.

== Awards and recognition ==
- In 1961, van der Hoeden was awarded the Israel Prize, in agriculture.
- In 1961, he was awarded the Zimmerman Prize.

== See also ==
- List of Israel Prize recipients
