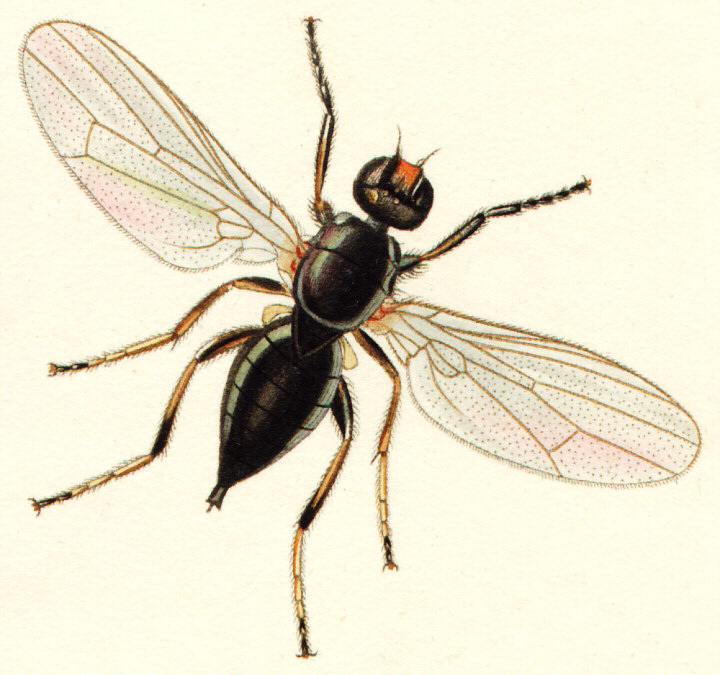
- Piophila casei

Scientific classification
- Kingdom: Animalia
- Phylum: Arthropoda
- Clade: Pancrustacea
- Class: Insecta
- Order: Diptera
- Superfamily: Tephritoidea
- Family: Piophilidae; Macquart, 1835

Subfamilies
- Neottiophilinae; Piophilinae; Thyreophorinae

Synonyms
- Neottiophilidae; Thyreophoridae

= Piophilidae =

Family of flies

The Piophilidae are a family of "true flies", in the order Diptera. The so-called cheese flies are the best-known members, but most species of the Piophilidae are scavengers in animal products, carrion, and fungi. They may accordingly be important in forensic entomology and medical entomology. For a fly maggot, the larvae of many species have an unusually well-developed ability to leap when alarmed or when abandoning their larval food to pupate; they accordingly may be known as cheese skippers or other kinds of skippers according to their food source.

== Overview ==
The most notorious member of the family is the cheese fly, Piophila casei; it is cosmopolitan, and a typical member of the family. It is a small species, about 4 mm (0.16 in) long. The fly's larvae infest cured meats, smoked or salted fish, cheeses, and carrion. The mature larva is about 8 mm (0.31 in) long and is sometimes called the cheese skipper because of its leaping ability - when disturbed, this tiny maggot can hop some 15 cm (6 in) into the air. Adults are also known as bacon flies and their larvae as bacon skippers, ham skippers, cheese maggots, cheese hoppers, etc. In the Mediterranean island of Sardinia, the larvae are intentionally introduced into pecorino cheese to produce the characteristic casu marzu ("rotten cheese" in Sardinian).

The adult cheese fly's body is black, blue-black, or bronze, with some yellow on the head, antennae, and legs. The wings are faintly iridescent and lie flat upon the fly's abdomen when at rest. At 4 mm (0.16 in) long, the fly is one-third to one-half as long as the common housefly.

== Behaviour patterns ==
Like the larvae of various fly families, including the family Tephritidae, the larvae of typical piophilids are notorious for jumping or "skipping", especially in their final instar. The larvae accomplish their jumps by bending over, grabbing onto the rears of their own bodies with their mouth hooks, and tensing their muscles in a manner that increases the pressure on their own blood and internal organs. When they release their grip, the internal pressure straightens out the tubular body, propelling the forequarters upwards, the rest of the body following. Jumping is performed most typically when the larva is alarmed by a disturbance, or when it is abandoning its feeding site in preparation for pupation.

The tiny piophilid species Protopiophila litigata, commonly known as the antler fly, breeds on discarded antlers of moose and other deer. On discarded antlers, the males form complex, highly structured aggregations in which a great deal of territorial competition occurs. In prime areas of the antler, near oviposition sites (cracks in the antler surface), males spend much of their time battling rival males. Males spend their entire lives competing on the same antler (only leaving to spend the night in nearby vegetation), making it possible to mark flies individually and obtain longitudinal field data on these tiny insects. This unique ecology made it possible to document senescence in wild insects for the first time.

The waltzing fly, Prochyliza xanthostoma, occurs in North America. It is one of the carrion-feeding piophilids and is remarkable for its sexual dimorphism and its patterns of behavioural adaptation and associated morphological adaptations. In particular, the antennae, forelegs, and heads of the males are adapted in unusual ways to their behaviour in combat and courtship. A male courts a female by dancing side-to-side, forequarters held high, displaying his elongated antennae and vibrating his elongated forelegs.

== Medical and forensic significance ==
If swallowed (whether accidentally or otherwise), the larvae sometimes survive in the intestines and pass through the digestive system alive. Such behaviour is known as enteric or intestinal myiasis. In the gut, the larvae may cause serious lesions by attempting to bore through the intestinal walls, causing gastric ulcers or gastrointestinal perforation. Symptoms include nausea, vomiting, pain in the abdomen, and bloody diarrhea. Both living and dead larvae may pass in the stool. Some species also have been known to cause naso-oral and urogenital myiasis.

In forensic entomology, the presence of P. casei larvae may be useful in estimating the date of death for human remains because they do not take up residence in a corpse until three to six months after death. However, P. casei is not the only piophilid species to attack human corpses, so caution is appropriate in identification of the species found and in interpretation of their significance.

== Description ==
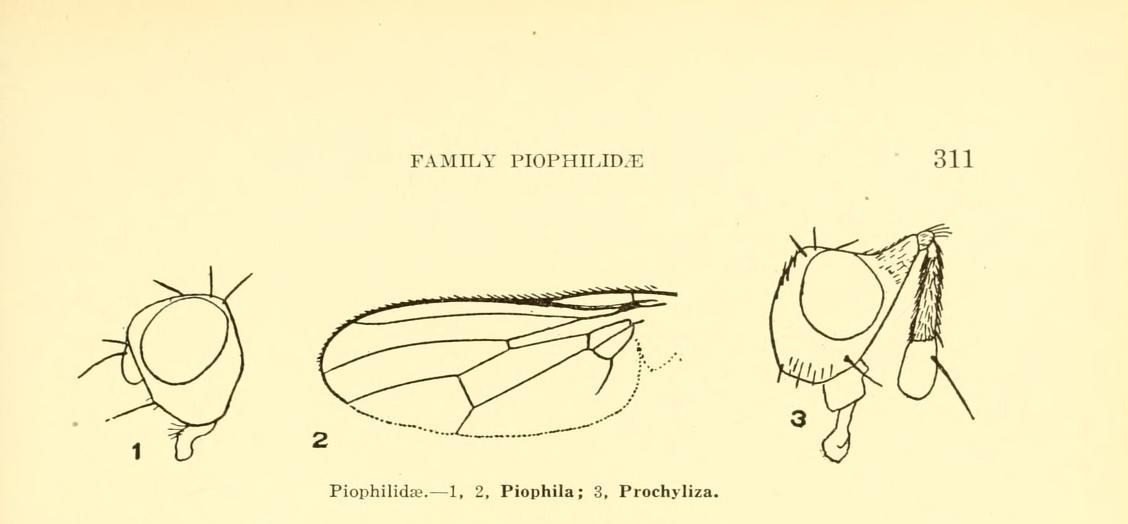
Morphological details of the Piophilidae

Piophilidae are small flies, often dark in color and shiny. The wings are usually clear and unmarked, with the exception of the genera Mycetaulus, Neottiophilum, Pseudoseps, and Thyreophora, which have brown wing markings. Like all tephritoid flies, female piophilids have an extensible ovipositor.

The family differs from the similar looking family Sepsidae in several characters, particularly in having the costa broken at the end of the subcosta, the setulose mesonotum and the absence of a hair or fine bristle arising on the posterior edge of the posterior spiracle of the thorax.

== Classification ==
The Piophilidae are a small family of less than 100 described species in 21 genera, mainly Holarctic in distribution, though some species are cosmopolitan. The nomenclature is volatile, with two subfamily names (Neottiophilinae and Thyreophorinae) in use recently, having been subsumed in the subfamily Piophilinae.

The genera of Piophilidae are:

- Actenoptera
- Allopiophila
- Amphipogon
- Bocainamyia
- Centrophlebomyia
- Dasyphlebomyia
- Diacanthomyia
- Lasiopiophila
- Mycetaulus
- Neopiophila
- Neottiophilum
- Piophila
- Piophilosoma
- Prochyliza
- Protopiophila
- Protothyreophora
- Pseudoseps
- Pygopiophila
- Stearibia
- Thyreolepida
- Thyreophora

Recent works containing keys for identification of the Piophilidae include:

- McAlpine, J. F. (1977). "A revised classification of the Piophilidae, including 'Neottiophilidae' and 'Thyreophoridae' (Diptera: Schizophora)". Memoirs of the Entomological Society of Canada. 103: 1–66. doi:10.4039/entm109103fv.
- McAlpine, J. F., ed. (1989). Manual of Nearctic Diptera. Agriculture Canada Monograph No. 32. Vol. 2.
- Ozerov, A. L. (2000). "Piophilidae". In Papp, L.; Darvas, A. (eds.). Contributions to a Manual of Palaearctic Diptera. Vol. Appendix. Budapest: Science Herald. pp. 355–365. ISBN 963-04-8840-X.
- Stackelberg, A. A. (1988). "Family Piophilidae". In Bei-Bienko, G. Ya. (ed.). Keys to the Insects of the European Part of the USSR. Vol. 5 (Diptera) (English ed.). Part 2.
- Rochefort, S.; et al. (2015). "Key to forensically important Piophilidae (Diptera) in the Nearctic Region". Canadian Journal of Arthropod Identification. 27: 1–37.

A still useful older work is Séguy, E. (1934) Diptères: Brachycères. II. Muscidae acalypterae, Scatophagidae. Éditions Faune de France 28. Paris: Paul Lechevalier et fils – via Bibliotheque Virtuelle Numerique.

== See also ==
- Cheese mite
- Casu marzu

== Genera ==
- The Western Palearctic subfamilies, tribes and genera of Piophilidae - Fauna Europaea

=== Species lists ===
- Palaearctic
- Nearctic
- Australasian/Oceanian
- Japan
- World list

== Image galleries ==
- "Antler Flies (Protopiophila litigata)". Evolutionary Biology Lab. University of New South Wales.
- "Waltzing Flies (Prochyliza xanthostoma)". Evolutionary Biology Lab. University of New South Wales.
- Images at Diptera.info
